= Godalming =

Town and civil parish in Surrey, England

Coordinates: 51°11′08″N 0°36′56″W

- Market town and civil parish
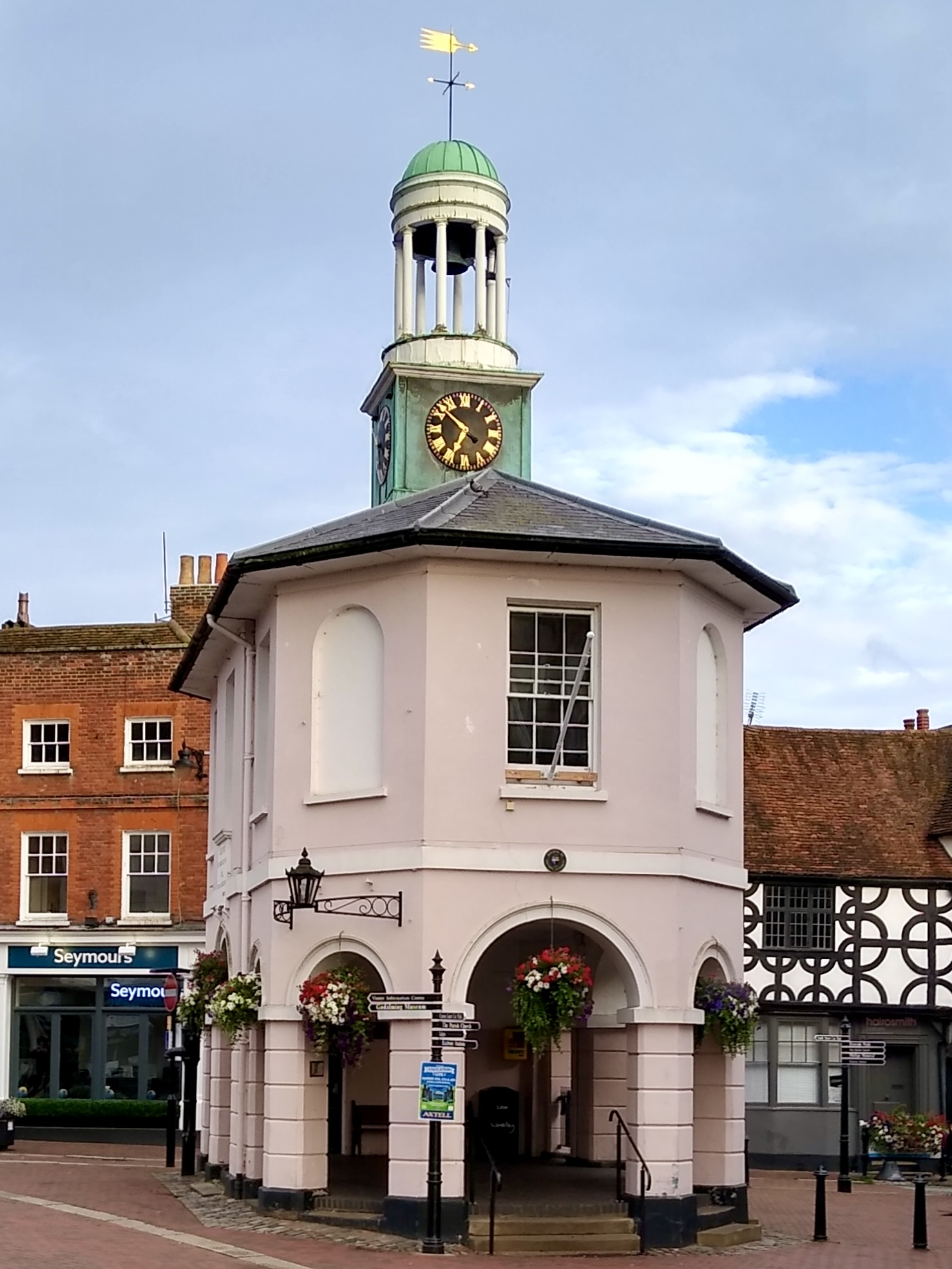
- The Pepperpot, High Street

- Location within Surrey
- Area: 9.68 km^{2} (3.74 sq mi)
- Population: 21,804 (civil parish 2011) or 22,689 (built-up area)
  - Density: 2,252/km^{2} (5,830/sq mi)
- OS grid reference: SU968437
  - London: 30 mi (49 km) NE
- Civil parish: Godalming
- District: Borough of Waverley
- Shire county: Surrey
- Region: South East
- Country: England
- Sovereign state: United Kingdom
- Post town: Godalming
- Postcode district: GU7
- Dialling code: 01483
- Police: Surrey
- Fire: Surrey
- Ambulance: South East Coast
- UK Parliament: Godalming and Ash

Godalming (/ˈɡɒdəlmɪŋ/ GOD-əl-ming) is a market town and civil parish in south-west Surrey, England, around 30 miles (49 km) south-west of central London. It is in the Borough of Waverley, at the confluence of the Rivers Wey and Ock. The civil parish covers 3.74 sq mi (9.7 km^{2}) and includes the settlements of Farncombe, Binscombe and Aaron's Hill. Much of the area lies on the strata of the Lower Greensand Group and Bargate stone was quarried locally until the Second World War.

The earliest evidence of human activity is from the Paleolithic and land above the Wey floodplain at Charterhouse was first settled in the middle Iron Age. The modern town is believed to have its origins in the 6th or early 7th centuries and its name is thought to derive from that of a Saxon landowner. Kersey, a woollen cloth, dyed blue, was produced at Godalming for much of the Middle Ages, but the industry declined in the early modern period. In the 17th century, the town began to specialise in the production of knitted textiles and in the manufacture of hosiery in particular.

Throughout its history, Godalming has benefitted from its location on the main route from London to Portsmouth Dockyard. Local transport links were improved from the early 18th century with the opening of the turnpike road through the town in 1749 and the construction of the Godalming Navigation in 1764. Expansion of the settlement began in the mid-19th century, stimulated by the opening of the first railway station in 1849 and the relocation of Charterhouse School from London in 1872. The town has a claim to be the first place in the world to have a combined public and private electricity supply.

Several buildings in the town centre date from the 16th and 17th centuries. The distinctive Pepperpot was built in 1814 to replace the medieval market house and to house the council chamber. Among the notable former residents of the civil parish were Jack Phillips, the senior wireless operator on the RMS Titanic, and the mountaineer George Mallory. James Oglethorpe, the founder of the Colony of Georgia, was born in Godalming in 1696 and the town maintains a friendship with the U.S. state and the cities of Savannah and Augusta in particular.

== Toponymy ==
The oldest surviving record of Godalming is from a c. 1000 copy of the c. 880 – c. 885 will of Alfred the Great, in which the settlement appears as Godelmingum. The name is written as Godelminge in the Domesday Book of 1086, and later as Godelminges (c. 1150 – c. 1200), Godhelming (c. 1170 – c. 1230), Godalminges (c. 1220 – c. 1265) and Godalmyn (c. 1485 – c. 1625). The second part of the name is thought to derive from the Old English —ingas and means "people of" or "family of" and the first part may refer to an Anglo-Saxon individual called Godhelm. (Note: The name Godhelm is "not found in any known textual source related to England in the period between the 5th and 11th centuries CE", but a similar name, Godohelm, is found in Old High German sources.) Thomas William Shore (1840–1905) suggested that Godhelm may be of Gothic origin and Robert Eugen Zachrisson (1880–1937) proposed that it may have been an early name for the River Ock or another local stream. Residents of Godalming are sometimes called "Godhelmians".

The first records of Binscombe and Busbridge are from the 13th century, when they appear as Budenscombe and Bursbrige respectively. Their names are thought to derive from individuals called Byden and Beohrtsige, names both found in Old English. Catteshall may mean "hill of the wild cat" or "hill belonging to a person called Catt". Farncombe appears in Domesday Book as Fearnecombe and is thought to mean "valley of the ferns". Frith Hill may derive from the Middle English frith, meaning "woodland".

== Geography ==
=== Location ===
Godalming is a town in the Borough of Waverley in south-west Surrey, around 30 mi (49 km) from central London and 4 mi (6.4 km) from Guildford. The town is in the valley of the River Wey, which flows northwards through Guildford to join the River Thames at Weybridge. Godalming High Street runs roughly east to west, linking an ancient crossing point of the Wey to the road leading south over Holloway Hill. The town is almost completely surrounded by the Metropolitan Green Belt and the Surrey Hills National Landscape is to the north and west.

Godalming Civil Parish has a total area of 3.74 sq mi (9.7 km^{2}). It includes the settlements of Binscombe, Frith Hill and Charterhouse (north of the river) and Aaron's Hill, Ockford Ridge and Crownpits (to the south). The majority of the built-up area of Busbridge is also in Godalming Civil Parish. Farncombe, to the north of the town, has a strong village identity and incorporates a small cluster of local shops on Farncombe and St John's Streets. Godalming has good transport links to London and Portsmouth via the railway line and A3 road.

At the west end of the town, the River Wey is joined by the River Ock, which rises at Witley, to the south. The main urban areas of Godalming and Farncombe are separated from the Wey by the floodplain, which includes the water meadows known as the Lammas Lands. Serious flooding events occurred in the local area in 1968, 1990, 2000, 2013 and 2020; new defences, including the construction of a 525 m (1,722 ft) flood wall and two pumping stations, were installed in the winter of 2018–19.

=== Geology ===
Godalming lies on the north-western side of the Weald and primarily sits on the strata of the Lower Greensand Group, laid down in the early Cretaceous. Atherfield Clay is found in the extreme north of the civil parish at Binscombe, where there was a former brickworks. Holloway Hill and much of the town centre are on the Hythe Beds, a loamy, fine-grained sandy layer that also includes some sandstone and chert. Although rare elsewhere in these strata, fossils of mollusc species occur in these beds in the Godalming area, including the bivalves Ostrea macroptera and Exogyra sinuata, and the brachiopods Rhynchonella parvirostris and Waldheimia tamarindus.

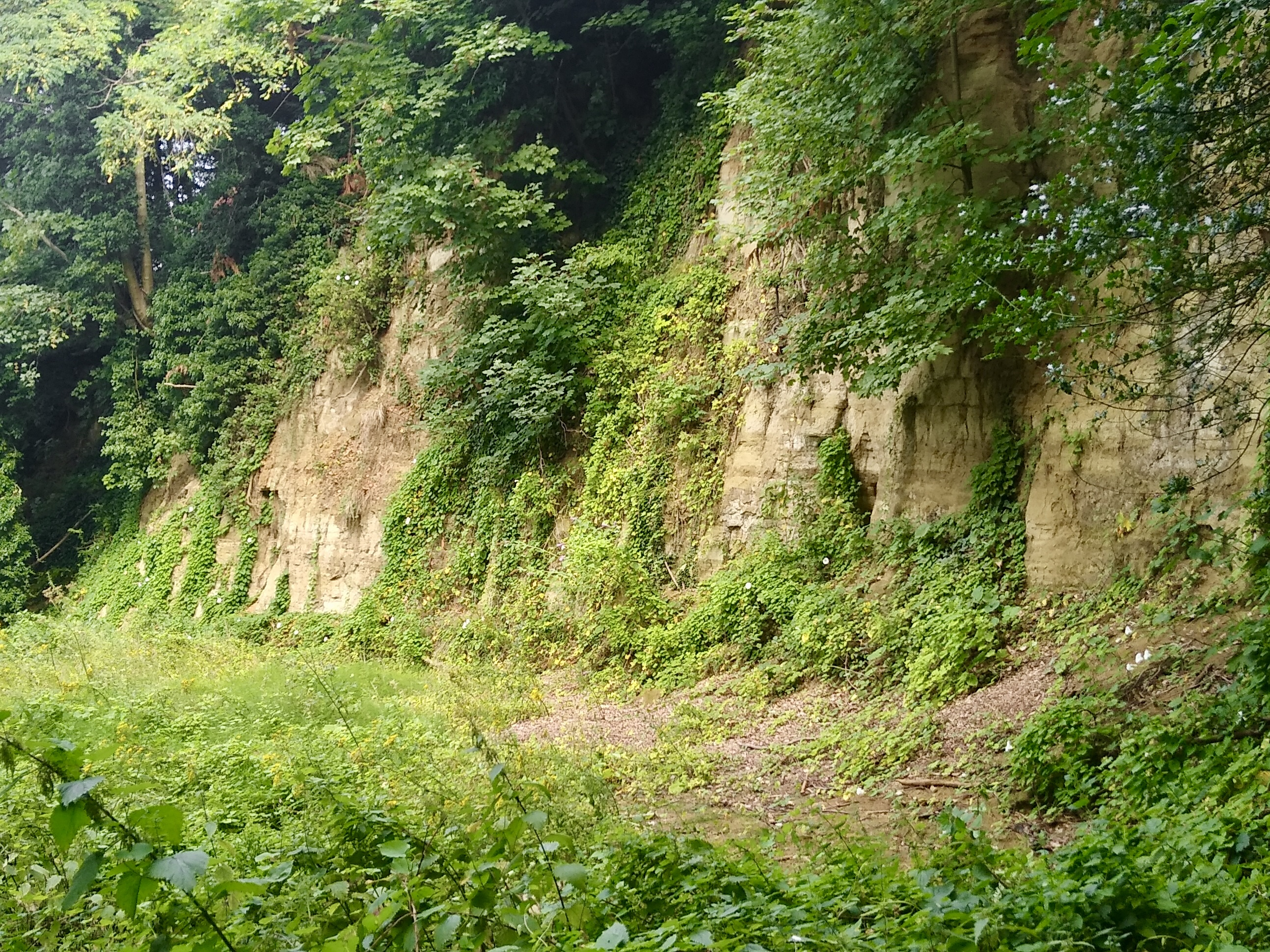
Former sand and Bargate stone quarry at the base of Holloway Hill

Frith Hill and Charterhouse are on the iron-rich Bargate Beds, a part of the more widespread lower Sandgate Formation that is only found in the Godalming area. This layer contains Bargate stone, a dark honey-coloured calcerous sandstone that was quarried until the Second World War at several sites in the civil parish. There are also small exposures of the sandy Folkestone Beds at Busbridge and to the north-west of Charterhouse. River gravels are found in the valleys of the Wey and Ock to the west and south of the town centre, and as a terrace at Farncombe. Alluvial deposits of sand and silt are found in the floodplain of the Wey, especially between Bridge Street and Catteshall.

== History ==
=== Early history ===
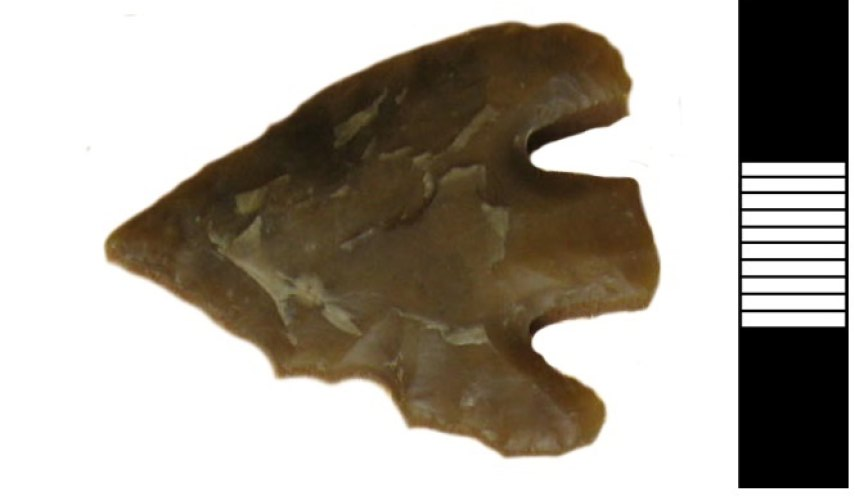

Bronze Age arrowhead, found in Godalming in 2017

The earliest evidence of human activity in the Godalming area is from the Stone Age. At least two Paleolithic hand axes as well as Mesolithic flint blades and flakes have been found in the civil parish. In 2017, a local schoolboy discovered a Bronze Age barbed and tanged arrowhead, which he subsequently donated to Godalming Museum. The higher ground above the River Wey floodplain at Charterhouse was occupied during the middle Iron Age and human habitation is thought to have continued into the early Roman period. There is thought to have been a small farmstead on the site in the late first century C.E. and there was also a villa at Binscombe. (Note: The Roman villa at Binscombe may have been abandoned after a violent incident that resulted in the collapse of one of the walls of an outbuilding.)

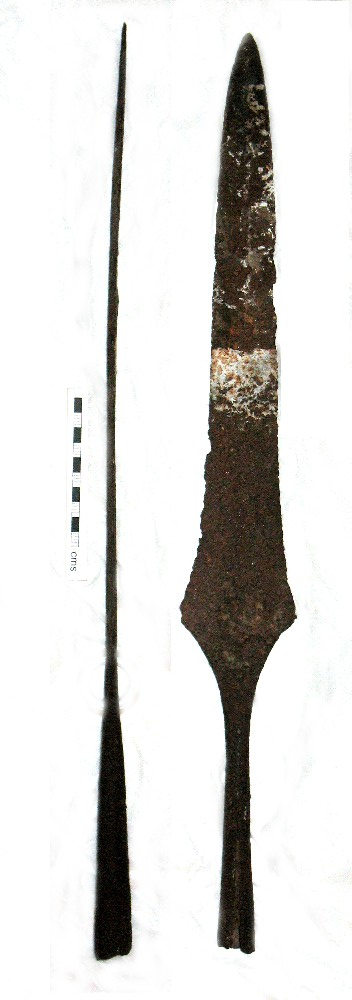
An early Anglo-Saxon spearhead, found in Farncombe in 1985

The Anglo-Saxon settlement at Godalming is thought to have been founded in the 6th or early 7th centuries, in the area surrounding the parish church. (Note: The earliest Saxon settlement in the Godalming area is thought to have been at Tuesley, in the Busbridge civil parish. The church at Tuesley is thought to have been founded shortly after the conversion of England to Christianity by Augustine of Canterbury in the early 7th century and may have been built on an existing religious site, dedicated to the pagan god Tiw.) The oldest stonework in the church dates from c. 820 – c. 840 and the base of the west wall of the tower is of Anglo-Saxon origin. The earliest documentary evidence for Godalming, is from the will of Alfred the Great in 880, in which the settlement and surrounding land is left to his nephew, Æthelwold ætheling. By the end of the Anglo-Saxon period, the town was the administrative centre of the Godalming Hundred, which stretched from Puttenham in the north-west to Chiddingfold in the south-east.

=== Governance ===
The town appears as Godelminge in Domesday Book; in 1086 it was held by Ranulf Flambard, who also held Tuesley and parts of Guildford. (Note: Flambard Way, the inner relief road that bypasses the High Street, is named after Ranulf Flambard, who was Lord of the manor of Godalming under William I.) The manor had sufficient land for 25 plough teams. It included 40 acres of meadow, woodland for 103 swine, three mills, two churches, and generated an annual income of £34. Farncombe appears in Domesday Book as Fernecome and was held by Odo of Bayeux.

At some point in the late 11th century, the Manor of Godalming was divided into two parts. The King's Manor was held by the Crown through the 12th century. There is evidence to suggest that it was held by Stephen de Turnham in 1206, but in 1221 it was granted to the Bishop of Salisbury by Henry III. It was held by the Bishop until 1541, when it was conveyed to Thomas Paston, who returned it to the Crown the following year. It was held by the monarch through the Tudor period until 1601, when Elizabeth I sold it to George More of Loseley Park.

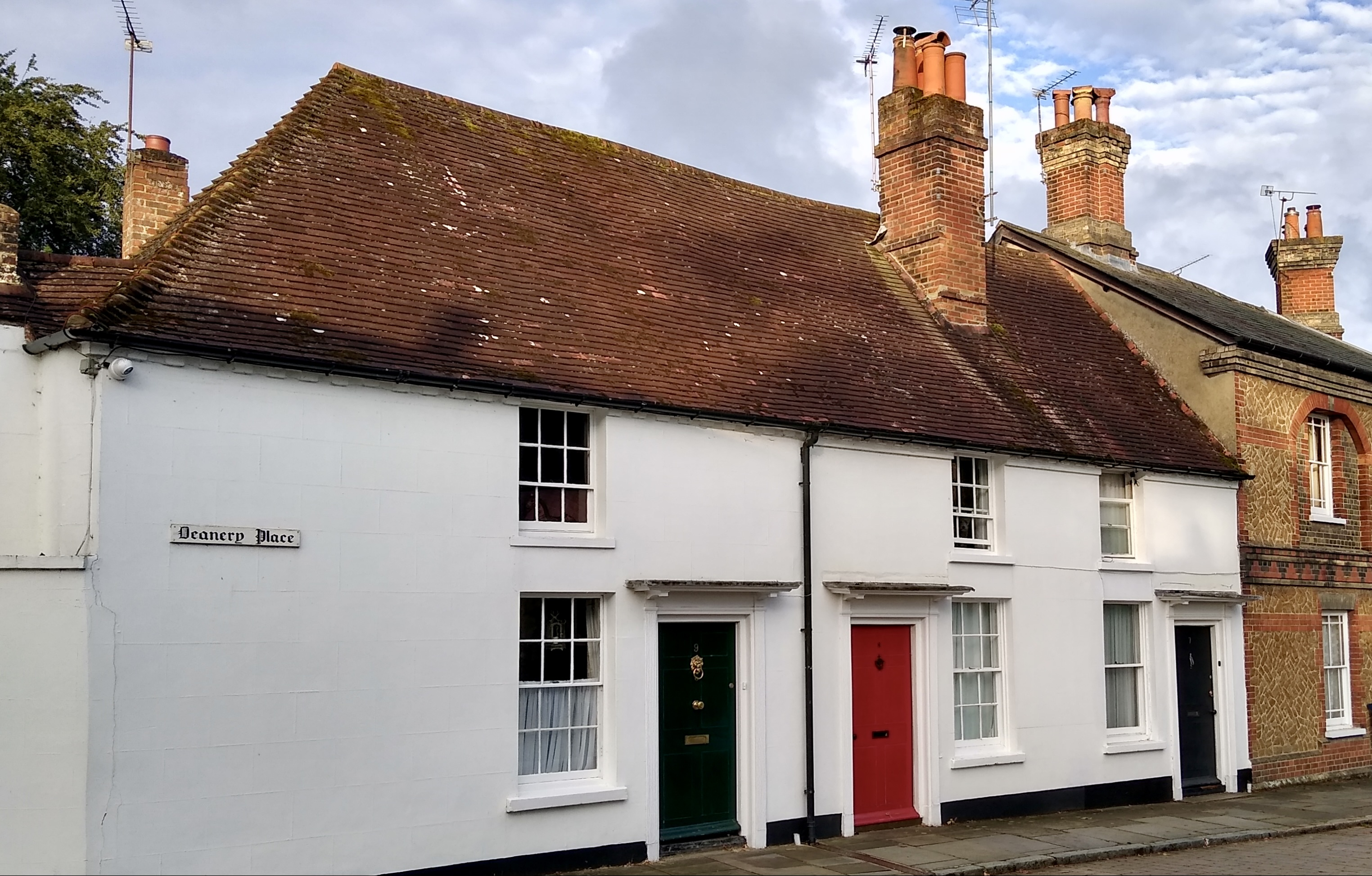
Terraced cottages in Deanery Place dating from the 15th century, formerly part of the Rectory Manor

The second part of the Manor of Godalming, known as the Rectory Manor or Deanshold, was granted to Salisbury Cathedral by Henry I in the early 12th century. It remained in the custodianship of the dean and chapter until the mid-19th century. For much of its history, the manor was leased to the Castillion family, but was held by the Ogelthorpe family in the 18th century. In 1846, the Rectory Manor was transferred to the Ecclesiastical Commissioners, who began to break up and sell off the estate in the early 1860s.

The first charter to be granted to Godalming was issued by Edward I on 7 June 1300. In it, he authorised a weekly market and a three-day annual fair on the Feast of Saints Peter and Paul in late June. The right to hold a market was confirmed by Elizabeth I in 1563 and, in January 1575, she issued a Charter of Incorporation, enabling Godalming to become a self-governing borough. The charter specified that a "warden" (effectively a mayor) should be elected by the town each year at Michaelmas. In 1620, Francis Bacon, the Lord Chancellor under James I, issued a document entitled "Ordinances and constitutions made and established for the better and government of the Town of Godalming in the County of Surry", which specified that the administration of the town should be the responsibility of the warden and eight assistants. It also provided for the appointment of a bailiff and restricted the amount of time that townspeople could spend in local inns and hostelries.

The modern system of local government began to emerge in the first half of the 19th century. Under the Municipal Corporations Act 1835, the town became a borough corporation under the control of a mayor and elected councillors. The following year, the Guildford Poor Law Union was formed, with responsibility for a total area of 12 sq mi (31 km^{2}) stretching from Godalming to Woking. As a result of the Local Government Act 1888, several responsibilities were transferred from the borough to the newly formed Surrey County Council. Farncombe was originally a separate civil parish, but became part of Godalming borough in 1892. The most recent change in local government took place in 1974, when the municipal boroughs of Godalming and Haslemere were merged with the Farnham Urban District and Hambledon Rural District to form Waverley District. At the same time, Godalming Town Council was constituted as the lowest tier of local government in the civil parish. The district became a borough on 21 February 1984, following the grant of a royal charter by Elizabeth II.

=== Commerce and industry ===
The right to hold a market was granted to Godalming in 1300 by Edward I. It probably took place each week at the junction of Church Street and the High Street. The right was confirmed in the 1563 charter of Elizabeth I, which stipulated that the market should be held every Wednesday. In 1674, the day was changed to Friday, but had reverted to Wednesday by the start of the 19th century. The market ceased in around 1879. The right to hold a fair each July was also granted in the charter of 1300 and continued to be held until 1870. A second annual fair, which originally took place over three days around Candlemas each February, was granted by Elizabeth I. By the start of the 19th century, the fair had been reduced to a single day and is last recorded in 1910.

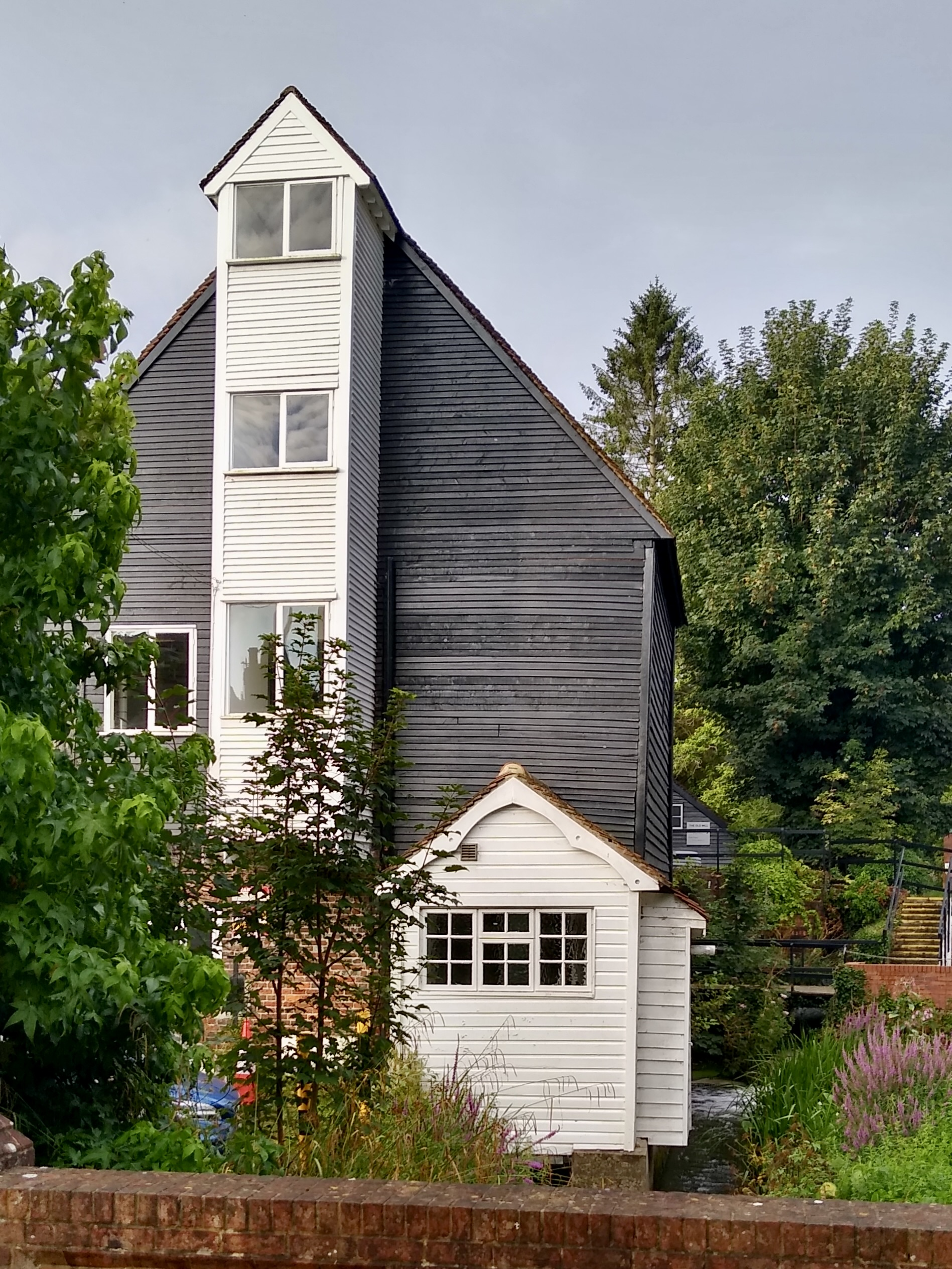
Hatch Mill on the River Ock

Three watermills are recorded in the entry for Godalming in Domesday Book. Although their identities are uncertain, the present day Catteshall, Hatch and Westbrook Mills on the River Wey are thought to be the likely locations. Hatch Mill, close to the parish church, may be the oldest mill site in Godalming. Catteshall Mill, to the north-east of the town centre, is first recorded in 1300 and was used for milling corn from c. 1660 until 1836. The two Westbrook Mills, also on the Wey, are around 100 m (110 yd) apart and are not clearly distinguished in historical records until the mid-19th century, when the upper mill became known as Salgasson Mill.

Godalming's medieval prosperity was founded on the wool trade. The North Downs provided good grazing land for sheep, there were local deposits of Fuller's earth in Surrey and the Wey provided a source of both water and power for fulling mills. Like Guildford, to the north, the town specialised in the manufacture of kersey, a coarse cloth, dyed blue. (Note: In the 1330s, it became illegal for cloth to be manufactured outside of market or corporate towns. Thereafter, in south-west Surrey, cloth could only be produced in Godalming, Guildford and Farnham.) Fulling took place at Catteshall Mill between 1300 and 1660, and at the Westbrook Mills in the 17th and early 18th centuries. Dyers are known to have been active in the town in the 17th century, but the kersey industry went into a steep decline in the middle of the century. Woollen cloth production ended at Guildford in the 1710s, but continued on a small scale in Godalming for around another 100 years.

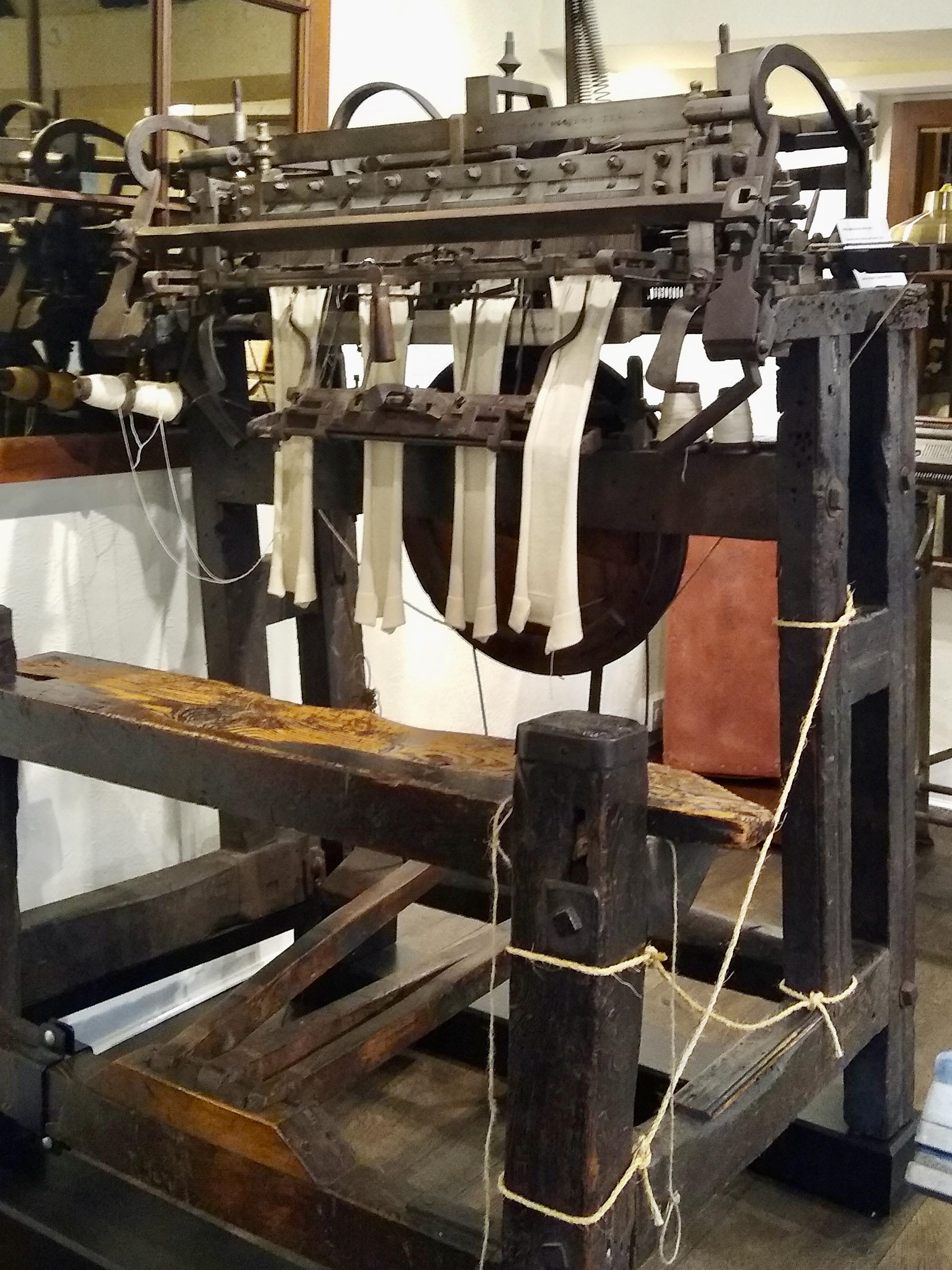
Stocking frame held by Godalming Museum. (Note: This stocking frame was donated to Godalming Museum in 1936 by Allen, Solly and Company of Arnold, Nottinghamshire. The firm operated in Godalming between 1860 and 1888. This frame is able to produce four stockings at a time.)

As cloth manufacture declined in Godalming, it was replaced by the production of knitted and woven textiles. A cottage industry developed in the town in the 17th century, producing woollen, silk and later cotton garments. Hosiery was knitted using a stocking frame invented by William Lee in the 1580s. Until the 18th century, most garments were produced by families working at home, but thereafter the industry became increasingly centralised. George Holland set up a factory in around 1790 for the manufacture of "Fleecy and Segovia Hosiery", using specially prepared wool. The Pitchers company was established in the town in 1885 and produced "Charterhouse sweaters", among other woollen items. The firm, which closed in the 1960s, is credited with the invention of a machine to produce the cable stitch.

Leather production was a significant part of the local economy from the mid-15th to mid-20th centuries. Tanneries are recorded at several sites in the town, including at Ockford Road, Meadrow and Catteshall Lock. In 1808, a "bark house" was erected in Mill Street for grinding bark and chamois leather was produced at the Westbrook Mills in the 19th century. The final leather producer in Godalming closed in 1952. (Note: Hell Ditch, which runs across part of the Lammas Lands between Godalming and Farncombe, was constructed in the 15th century. It may have been dug as a flood relief channel, but it may also have been used to divert foul-smelling waste water from the local leather tanneries away from the town centre.)

The Godalming area was an important centre for papermaking and, in the early 17th century, several mills in the town produced coarse sheets of "whited brown paper". Papermaking took place at the Westbrook Mills in the 17th and early 18th centuries, and at Catteshall Mill from the 1660s until 1928. (Note: Papermaking also took place at Eashing Mill, Eashing from 1658 until at least the 1870s.)

=== Transport and communications ===
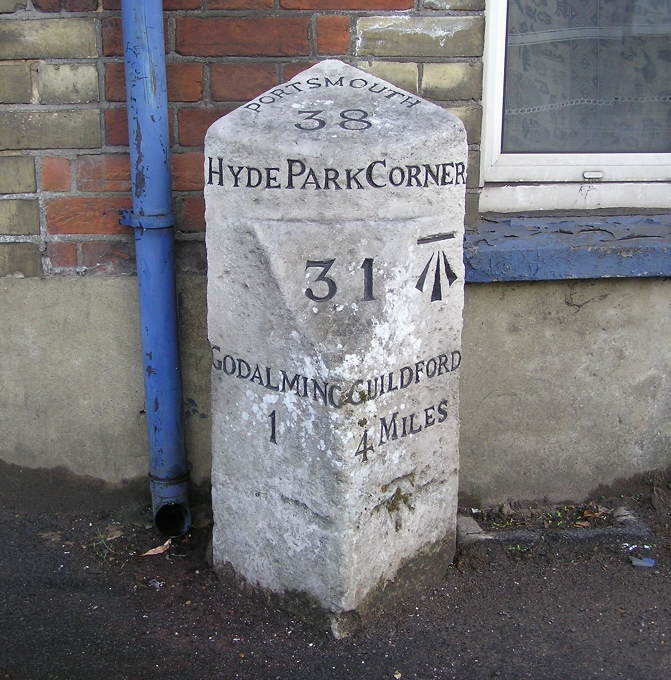
Milestone on Meadrow, Farncombe

A ford across the Wey at the site of the current Town Bridge was established by the 12th century. In the late-medieval period, there was also a bridge owned by the Lord of the manor at this location, but the ford was used by townspeople except in times of flood. (Note: In the late-medieval period, local townspeople were only permitted to use the bridge during times of flood and were required to cross the Wey via the ford when the water level was sufficiently low.) The road through Godalming between Kingston upon Thames and Petersfield was turnpiked in 1749 and the present Town Bridge was constructed in 1782 by the County Surveyor, George Gwilt. (Note: The Town Bridge has been widened twice, in the 1920s and 1930s, and was strengthened with the addition of a concrete saddle in 1992.) (Note: There are remains of a medieval stone bridge at Catteshall Lock. It is unclear whether it remained standing into the early modern period, but if so, it would have been necessary to demolish it when the Godalming Navigation was constructed in the 1760s.) The road south from the town centre through Busbridge to Hascombe was turnpiked in 1826.

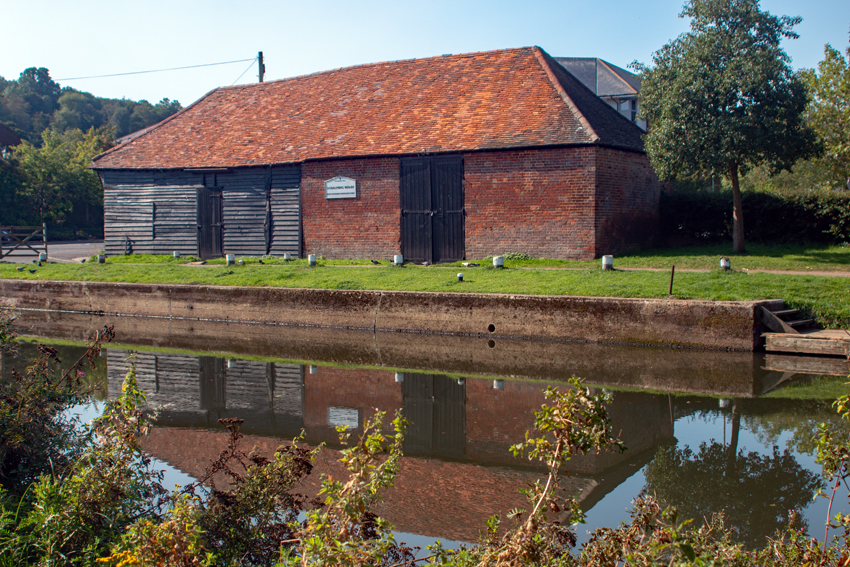
Godalming Wharf at the end of the Godalming Navigation

The Wey has been used for navigation since ancient times and it is likely that wool, cloth and timber were transported via the unimproved river during the medieval period. The River Wey Navigation, between the River Thames and Guildford was authorised by Act of Parliament in 1651. Although its southern terminus was four miles north of the town, the opening of the new waterway had a positive impact on the economy of Godalming.

The Wey Navigation Act 1760 authorised the construction of the Godalming Navigation. The waterway, which opened in 1764 with four locks, extended the navigable stretch of river southwards. A 10-acre (4.0 ha) wharf was constructed on the south side of the Wey, close to the town centre. The busiest period for the navigation was during the 1810s, when timber, flour, and goods made of iron were shipped from Godalming, but after the arrival of the railway in 1849, it went into sharp decline. After 1918, there were only two commercial barges working the river south of Guildford and the final shipments from Godalming took place in 1925. The Godalming Navigation passed to the National Trust in 1968.

The first railway station in Godalming opened in 1849 on the north side of the Wey. It was the southern terminus of the line built by the London and South Western Railway (LSWR) from Guildford. A decade later, the line to Havant was constructed speculatively by the engineer, Thomas Brassey. This 32.75 mi (52.71 km) line was initially single track and joined the branch from Guildford to the north of the first railway station. Although construction was completed in 1858, the first passenger trains south of Godalming did not run until January of the following year. Initially there were four services in each direction per day between Guildford and Havant, which had increased to seven (with a single short working to Petersfield) by 1890. The opening of the line necessitated the building of the current railway station, although the original station was retained until 1969 for freight. (Note: The site of the old Godalming railway station, on the north side of the River Wey, was cleared for development in the early 1970s. It is now occupied by the houses in Old Station Way.) Farncombe railway station, the only intermediate station between Guildford and Godalming, opened on 1 May 1897. The line south of Godalming was doubled in 1871 and was electrified in 1937.

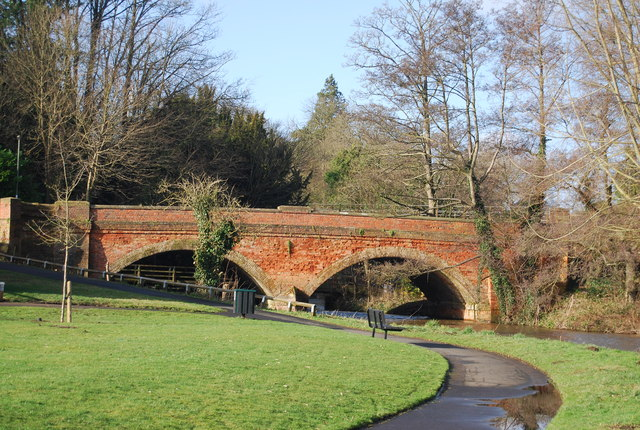
Borough Bridge

Late 19th century improvements in the local road network included the construction of Borough Road and Borough Bridge to link the newly opened Charterhouse School to the town centre. The 9.1 mi (14.6 km) Guildford and Godalming bypass (now the A3) was opened in July 1934. In the 1990s, Flambard Way was built to divert through traffic around the town centre. Its construction divided Queen Street in two and severed the connections from Mill Lane and Holloway Hill to the High Street.

=== Residential development ===
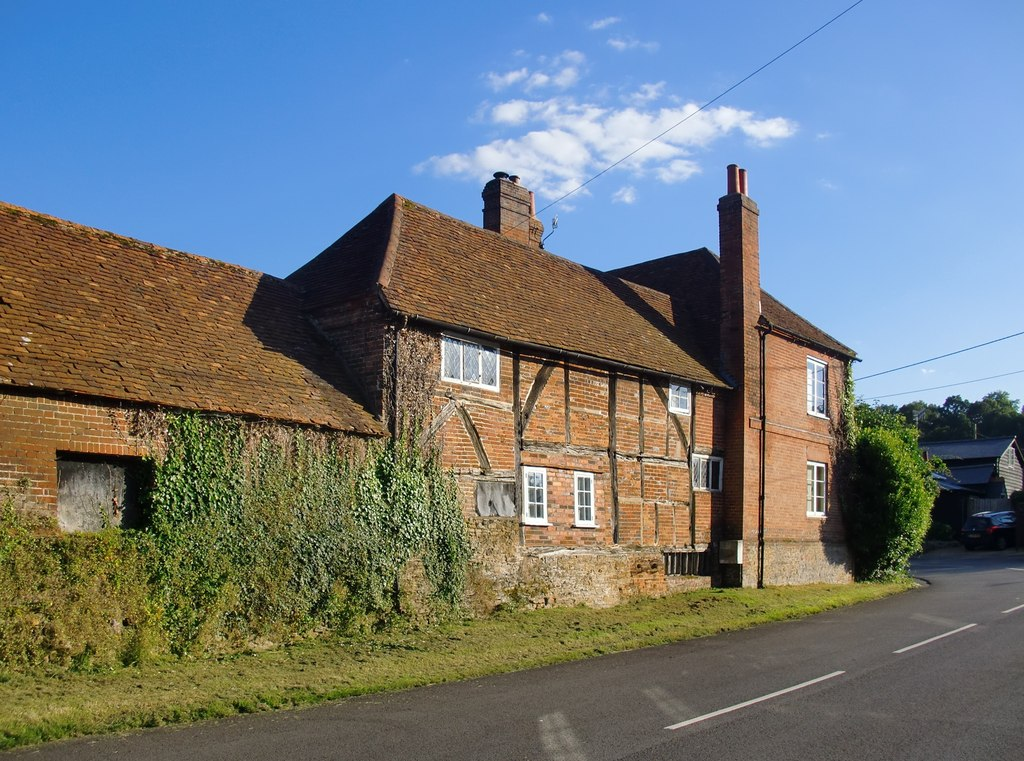
Binscombe Farm

The basic layout of Church Street, the High Street and Bridge Street are thought to have been established by the 13th century and may be pre-conquest in origin. The Saxon settlement was concentrated in the Church Street area and Godalming expanded along the modern High Street in the 11th and 12th centuries. The first houses may have been constructed in The Mint in the late 13th or early 14th centuries. The town does not appear to have expanded significantly in the early modern period, although the oldest surviving buildings in the centre date from the 16th century. The settlement at Binscombe village grew up in the medieval period around Binscombe Farm. Much of the hamlet, including the original farmhouse, is designated a Conservation Area.

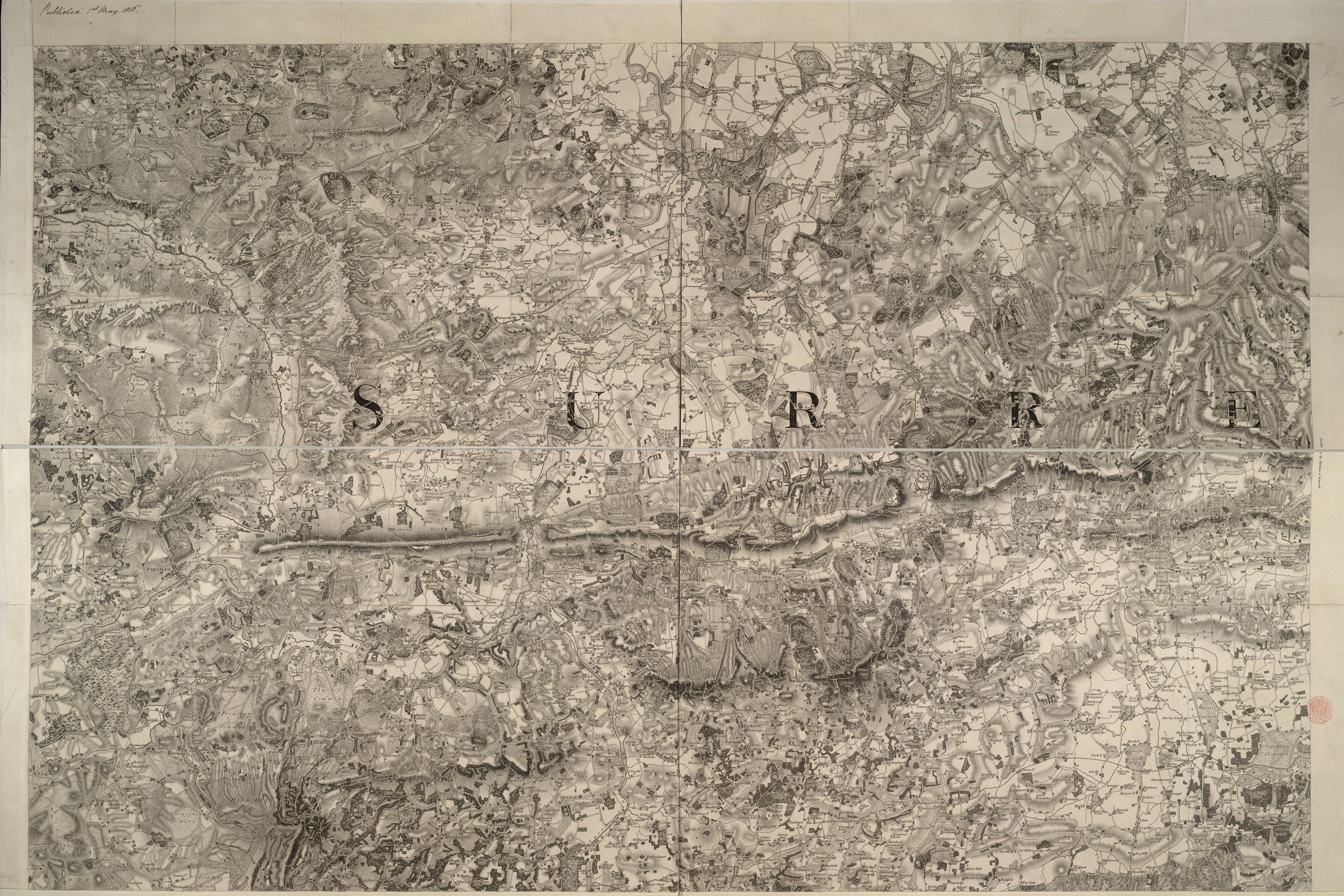
Godalming in 1816

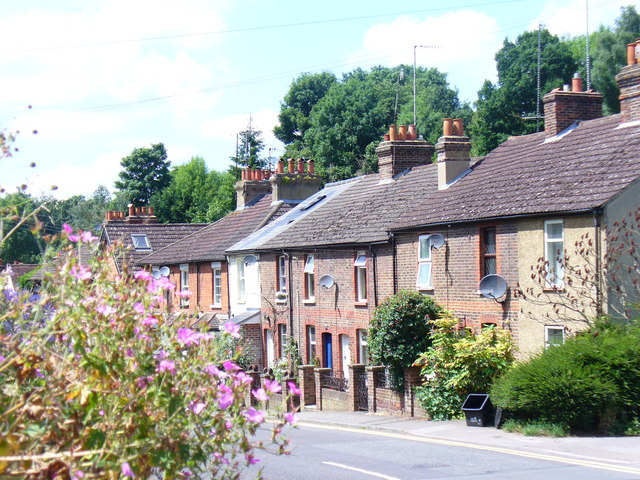
Victorian houses on Brighton Road, Crownpits

Godalming began to grow in the mid-19th century, catalysed by the opening of the first railway station in 1849 and the arrival of Charterhouse School in 1872. (Note: The horticulturist, Gertrude Jekyll, who lived at Munstead Wood, attributed the growth of Godalming to the arrival of the school. In her book, Old West Surrey, published in 1904, she wrote: "The building of Charterhouse School, finished in 1872, did much to awaken [the town], and to raise the value of land in the immediate neighbourhood for building. It also gave a lively impetus to trade; and Godalming is now flourishing and commercially active a town as any of its size in the south of England.") The first cottages were constructed at Crownpits in the 1880s and farmland to the south of the town centre was sold for development in the same decade. Summerhouse, Busbridge and Oakdene Roads had been laid out by the mid-1890s and most of the houses had been built by the end of the century. The area north of Home Farm Road was developed in the 1970s and the Bargate Wood estate was built in the 1980s.

Farncombe began to grow in the early Victorian era, with terraced housing, semi-detached houses and larger villas being built along new streets branching from existing roads such as Hare Lane, Summers Road and Farncombe Street. Until the mid-19th century, Charterhouse and Furze Hill were part of Deanery Farm, although much of the latter was woodland. (Note: Deanery Farm farmhouse still stands and is now 46 Charterhouse Road.) In 1865, the land was sold in lots, with 70 acres (28 ha) being acquired for the site of Charterhouse School. Houses in Deanery and Peperharrow Roads were built in the early 1870s, but in the mid-20th century many were either divided into flats or demolished, and higher-density housing was constructed on their former gardens. In the 1960s, the school vacated its properties on Frith Hill Road and on Markenholm, and the sites were sold for residential development. Housing on The Brambles was constructed in the mid-1980s. The most recent major developments in Farncombe took place in the early 21st century off Furze Lane.

The first council housing in the civil parish was constructed in 1920 around The Oval and Broadwater Lane in Farncombe. The first 168 houses on the Ockford Ridge estate, west of the town centre, were completed in 1931 and were followed by a further 32 new homes on Cliffe Road in 1935. After the Second World War, the Aaron's Hill development was built on the site of the former Ockford House. The Binscombe estate was constructed in the 1950s, to the north-west of Farncombe.

=== Godalming in the world wars ===
During the First World War, soldiers were billeted at nearby Witley Camp. A canteen was set up in Croft Road for those arriving via Godalming station. Allotments were planted at the Holloway Hill Recreation Ground and villagers in Busbridge were employed to manufacture baskets for 18 lb high-explosive shells. In October 1914, the Red Cross opened a hospital for wounded soldiers at Charterhouse School.

During the Second World War, the defence of Godalming was the responsibility of the 4th Battalion of the Surrey Home Guard, part of South East Command. A total of 213 bombs fell on the town, including two V-1 flying bombs, although no civilians were killed. In September 1939, around 40 children were evacuated to Busbridge from Wandsworth and several houses in Godalming were requisitioned to provide accommodation for soldiers. St Thomas's Hospital Medical School was also evacuated to Godalming and used the Charterhouse School science laboratories to teach in. Many students joined local home guard. A British Restaurant was opened in Angel Yard and Branksome House, in Filmer Grove, served as a district control centre. The manufacturer, RFD, set up a factory in Catteshall Lane to produce barrage balloons, inflatable boats and life jackets and, by the end of the war, was employing over 1000 local people.

== National and local government ==
=== UK parliament ===
The entirety of Godalming Civil Parish is in the revised (2024) parliamentary constituency of Godalming and Ash

=== County council ===
Surrey County Council, headquartered in Reigate, is elected every four years. Godalming is represented by two councillors.

Election	Member	Ward
2017	Penny Rivers	Godalming North
2021	Paul Follows	Godalming South, Milford and Witley

=== Borough council ===
The town is divided into four wards; Binscombe and Charterhouse, Central and Ockford, Farncombe and Catteshall, and Holloway. Godalming is represented by nine councillors, elected to Waverley Borough Council:

Election	Member	Ward
2019	Nick Palmer	Godalming Binscombe and Charterhouse
2019	Paul Rivers	Godalming Binscombe and Charterhouse
2019	Steve Williams	Godalming Binscombe and Charterhouse
2017	Paul Follows	Godalming Central and Ockford
2023	Victoria Kiehl	Godalming Central and Ockford
2023	Janet Crowe	Godalming Farncombe and Catteshall
2019	Penny Rivers	Godalming Farncombe and Catteshall
2023	Adam Duce	Godalming Holloway
2010	Peter Martin	Godalming Holloway

=== Godalming Town Council ===
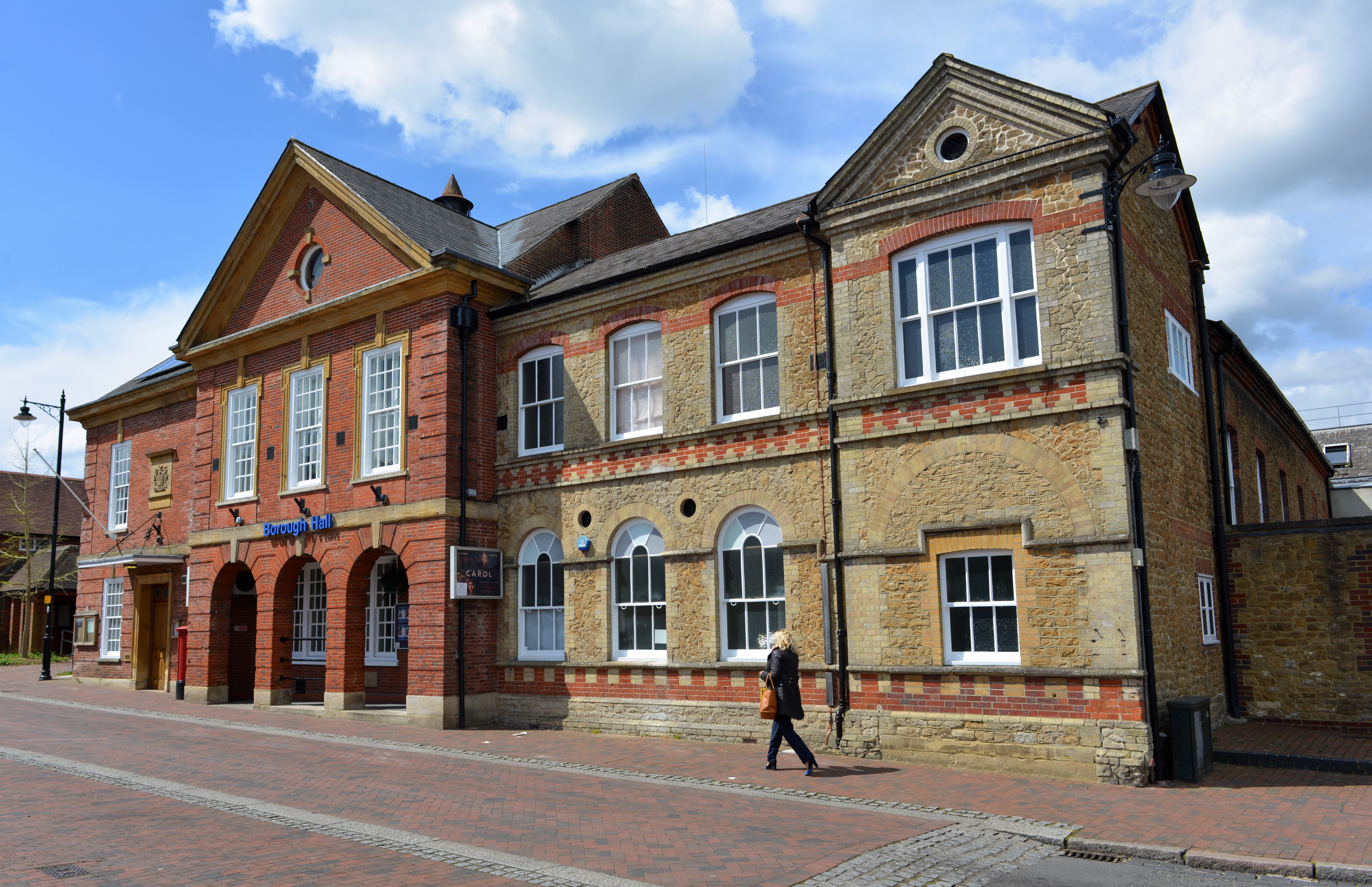
The south-east façade of Godalming Borough Hall in 2016

Godalming Town Council is the lowest tier of local government in the civil parish. A total of 20 councillors is elected every four years. Each year, one councillor is chosen as the Mayor, who represents the town on civic occasions and who is recognised as the principal citizen of Godalming. Godalming is twinned with Mayen, Germany (April 1982) and Joigny, France (May 1985). The town retains strong friendship links with the state of Georgia, USA, and with the cities of Savannah and Augusta in particular, through the organisation, the Friends of Oglethorpe. Since 2011, the town council has held the power to confer the titles of "Honorary Freeman" and "Honorary Freewoman" on residents who have demonstrated outstanding service to or made a significant contribution to the community. As of 2022, two people (Zadie Caudle and John Young) have been recognised in this way.

== Demography and housing ==
2011 Census Key Statistics
Output area	Population	Households	Owned outright	Owned with a loan	Social rented	Private rented
Godalming Binscombe	4,087	1,698	30.8%	31.2%	30.3%	5.8%
Godalming Central and Ockford	4,692	1,984	26.6%	34.5%	18.3%	19.2%
Godalming Charterhouse	4,105	1,575	34.0%	35.1%	5.1%	22.2%
Godalming Farncombe and Catteshall	4,600	2,091	29.8%	35.7%	13.0%	17.7%
Godalming Holloway	3,287	1,633	45.1%	44.0%	2.3%	7.5%
Total for Godalming Civil Parish	21,804	8,954	32.8%	36.0%	14.1%	14.8%
South East Region	8,634,750	3,555,463	35.1%	32.5%	13.7%	16.3%

2011 Census Homes
Output area	Detached	Semi-detached	Terraced	Flats and apartments
Godalming Binscombe	26.4%	45.5%	20.1%	8.0%
Godalming Central and Ockford	16.7%	36.0%	21.8%	25.4%
Godalming Charterhouse	36.1%	17.3%	12.0%	34.6%
Godalming Farncombe and Catteshall	16.4%	35.0%	25.4%	23.2%
Godalming Holloway	64.0%	19.8%	10.8%	5.4%
Total for Godalming Civil Parish	30.3%	31.3%	18.6%	19.8%
South East Region	28.0%	27.6%	22.4%	21.2%

== Public services ==
=== Utilities ===
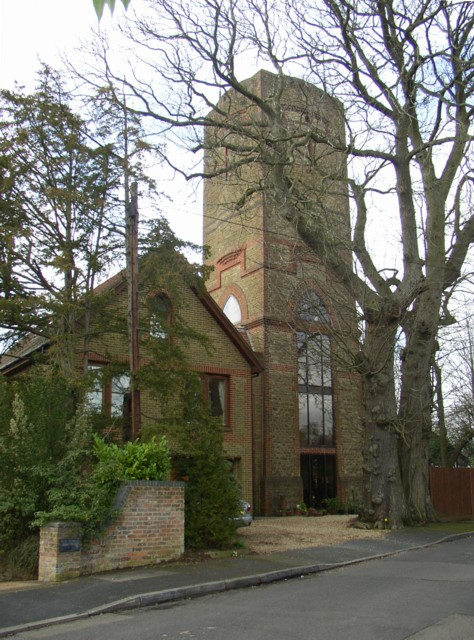
The former water tower on Frith Hill has been converted to a private house.

For much of the town's history, residents obtained drinking water from local rivers or from wells. In the early 19th century, a hand-operated pump was installed next to the Pepperpot in the High Street. (Note: The 1.5 m-high (4.9 ft) cast-iron pump was manufactured by Clinton and Owens in London. It was relocated from the north side to the south side of the Pepperpot in the 1870s.) A 45 m-deep (148 ft) well was dug at Charterhouse to supply the school with water. In around 1880, water mains were installed in Godalming and Farncombe, fed from a water tower on Frith Hill. In 1899, the borough council purchased the water tower, becoming responsible for the drinking water supply to the town until 1974. In that year, the water tower was decommissioned and a new covered reservoir was opened at Sandy Lane.

The town sewerage system was constructed in 1894 and included a sewage works at Unstead Farm, to the north of Farncombe. Until this point, waste water had been disposed of in cesspits, resulting in the contamination of drinking water wells; outbreaks of cholera and typhoid are recorded in Godalming in the 18th and 19th centuries. The municipal tip was opened next to the sewage works in the early 1900s. (Note: Before the opening of the municipal tip at Unstead Farm, coal dust was collected from houses in the town by private contractors and was sold to brick manufacturers to mix with clay to make cheaper bricks.)

The Godalming Gas and Coke Company was established in 1825 and purchased part of Godalming Wharf for the site of its gasworks. Gas was provided for street lighting between 1836 and 1881, and again from 1884 to 1900. The coal required initially arrived by barge, but was delivered by train after the first railway station opened in 1849. The gasworks closed in 1957, when the town supply was linked to that of Guildford.

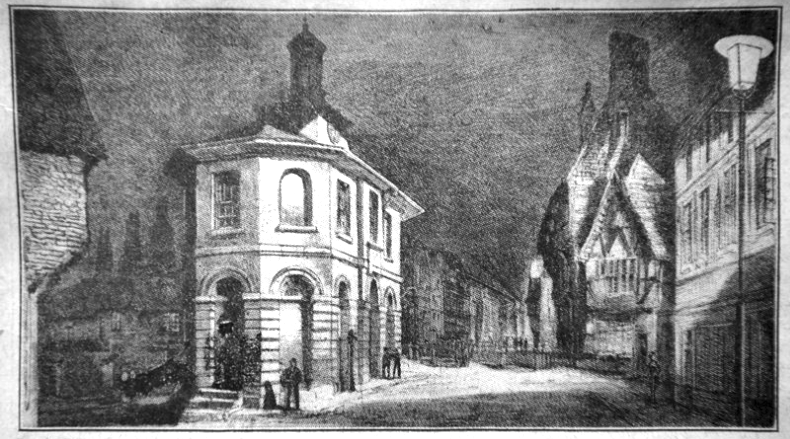
Introduction of street lighting to Godalming, November 1881 (from The Graphic)

Godalming has a claim to be the first town in the world to have a combined public and private electricity supply. The price of gas had risen during the 1870s and the borough sought an alternative method of providing street lighting. In 1881, the London firm of Calder and Barrett installed a generator driven by two Poncelet waterwheels at Westbrook Mill. The electricity was used to power three 250 V arc lights at the mill and overhead cables were run above Mill Street to the town centre, where a further four arc lights were installed. A second, 40 V circuit supplied 34 incandescent lamps (of which seven were at the mill and the remainder were in the town centre). The scheme met with mixed success and there were criticisms that the lights in the town centre were too dim, while those at the mill were too bright. By the end of 1881, the generator had been moved to the rear of the White Hart pub, where it was driven by a steam engine and, in April 1882, Siemens took over the operation. The electricity supply continued until 1884, when Siemens refused to bid for the renewal of its contract and the town reverted to gas lighting.

The second power station in Godalming was opened in Borough Road in 1902. By the end of the following year, two 90 kW and one 200 kW steam-powered generators had been installed, which were replaced in 1928 by a 200 kW diesel-driven generator. Under the Electricity (Supply) Act 1926, Godalming was connected to the National Grid, initially to a 33 kV supply ring, which linked the town to Guildford, Hindhead, Woking and Aldershot. In 1932, the ring was connected to the Wimbledon-Woking main via a 132 kV substation at West Byfleet. By the time of its closure in 1949, the Borough Road power station had an installed capacity of 600 kW.

=== Emergency services ===
From the early part of the 17th century, the borough appears to have employed a "bedle" or "bellman" to apprehend troublemakers and, in 1747, there is a reference to a "cage prison" in Godalming. By 1762, a uniformed town watchman was employed with an annual salary of £10 and a "constable of Godalming" is first recorded in 1817. The borough police force was formed in 1836 and briefly became part of the county force from 1851 to 1857. By 1868, the police station was in Moss Lane and had three cells capable of holding a total of nine people. The force was led by a superintendent, assisted by a constable, a night watch and several special constables.

In 1889, the borough force became part of the Surrey Constabulary, under the provisions of the Local Government Act 1888. A new police station, built on the site of the former gasworks, opened in 1969 and closed in 2012. In 2022, policing in the civil parish is the responsibility of Surrey Police and the nearest police station run by the force is at Guildford.

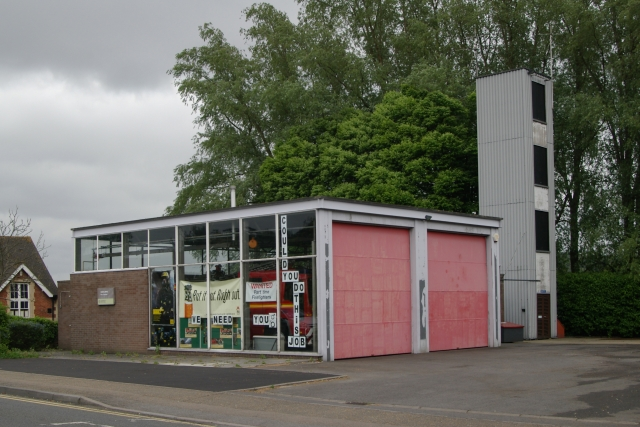
Godalming Fire Station

The first fire station in Godalming was constructed in Moss Lane in 1816. It housed a manual fire pump, mounted on a pushcart, that could be used by local residents when the need arose. It was not until 1870 that the town fire brigade was formally constituted, initially as a volunteer force, with the equipment funded by public subscription. Six years later, the station moved to Godalming Wharf and, in 1894, the borough took over the running of the brigade. From this point onwards, the firefighters were paid for each incident that they attended, with the cost charged to the property owners who used their services. In 1904, the borough purchased a horse-drawn steam pump and, in May of the same year, the force moved to a new fire station in Queen Street. During the Second World War, it became part of the National Fire Service and, in 1948, Surrey Fire and Rescue Service was formed. The fire brigade moved to the current station in Bridge Road in 1972.

In 2022, the local fire authority is Surrey County Council and the statutory fire service is the Surrey Fire and Rescue Service. Godalming Ambulance Station, in Catteshall Lane, is run by the South East Coast Ambulance Service.

=== Healthcare ===
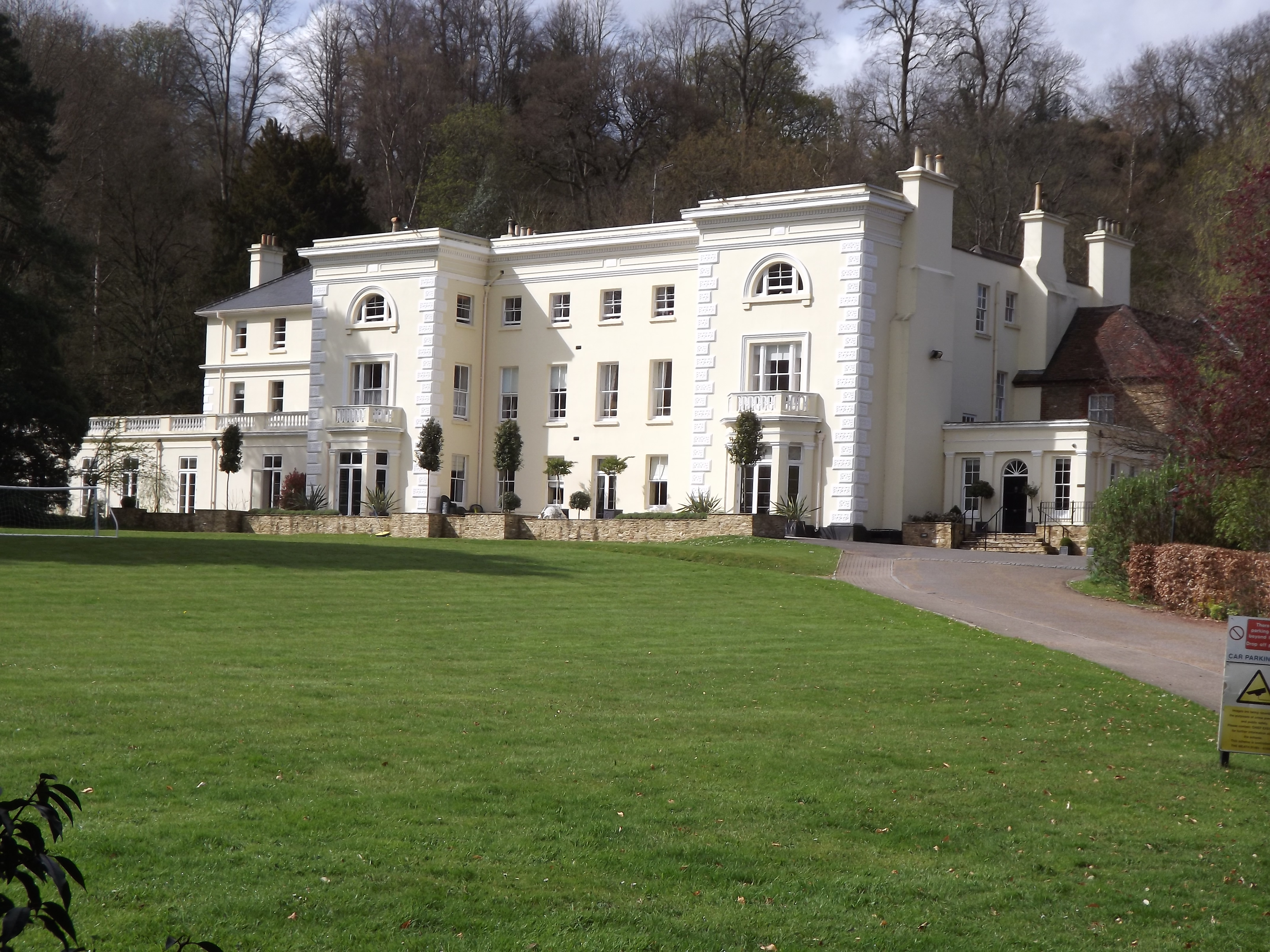
The Meath

The Meath Epilepsy Charity was founded in 1892 by Mary Jane Brabazon, Countess of Meath. She purchased Westbrook House and opened the "Home of Comfort for Epileptic Women and Girls". By 1920, The Meath, as it became known, was offering residential care for 87 patients. In 2020, 82 adults with epilepsy were offered residential care and the charity supported an additional 30 clients. Changing Perceptions, in Godalming High Street, is The Meath's social enterprise and offers patients opportunities to work in the furniture workshop and in the café.

The nearest hospital with an A&E is the Royal Surrey County Hospital, 6.3 km (3.9 mi) from Godalming. As of 2022, the town has two GP practices, one at Catteshall Mill and one at Binscombe.

== Transport ==
=== Bus and train ===
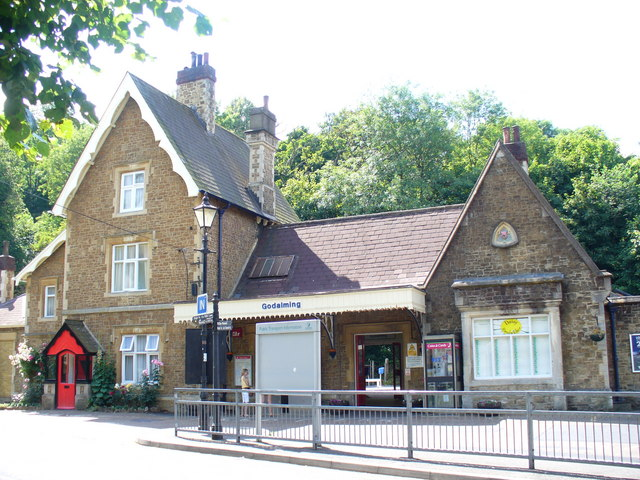
Godalming railway station

Godalming is linked by a number of bus routes to surrounding towns and villages in south-west Surrey. Operators serving the town include Compass Bus, Stagecoach and the Compo Community Bus.

South Western Railway operates all services from both Godalming and Farncombe stations. Trains run to London Waterloo via Guildford and to Portsmouth Harbour via Haslemere. There is a taxi rank at Godalming station.

=== River navigation ===
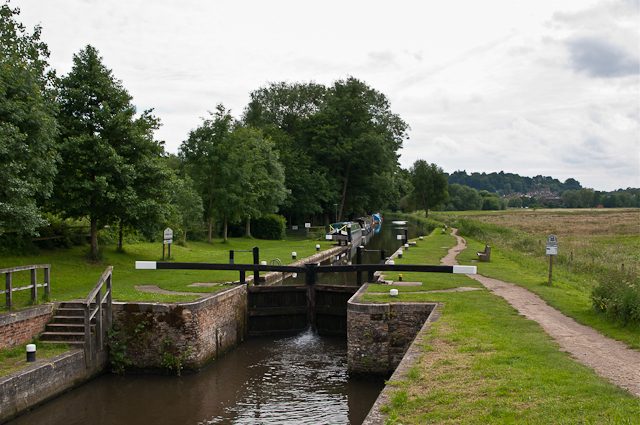
Catteshall Lock

The River Wey is navigable from Godalming northwards to Weybridge and the navigation authority is the National Trust. The head of navigation is at Godalming Wharf, about 50 m (55 yd) downstream of Town Bridge. Catteshall Lock has a fall of 1.7 m (5.6 ft) and is the southernmost lock on the connected inland waterways of Great Britain.

=== Long-distance cycleway and footpath ===
The Farnham Link of the Surrey Cycleway runs through the civil parish from Charterhouse via the town centre to Holloway Hill. The final stage of the Tour of Britain 2012 passed through Godalming.

The Fox Way, a 39 mi (63 km) footpath that encircles Guildford, follows the towpath of the Wey Navigation from Catteshall to Town Bridge, before running north of the town centre and Aaron's Hill towards Eashing.

== Education ==
=== Early schools ===
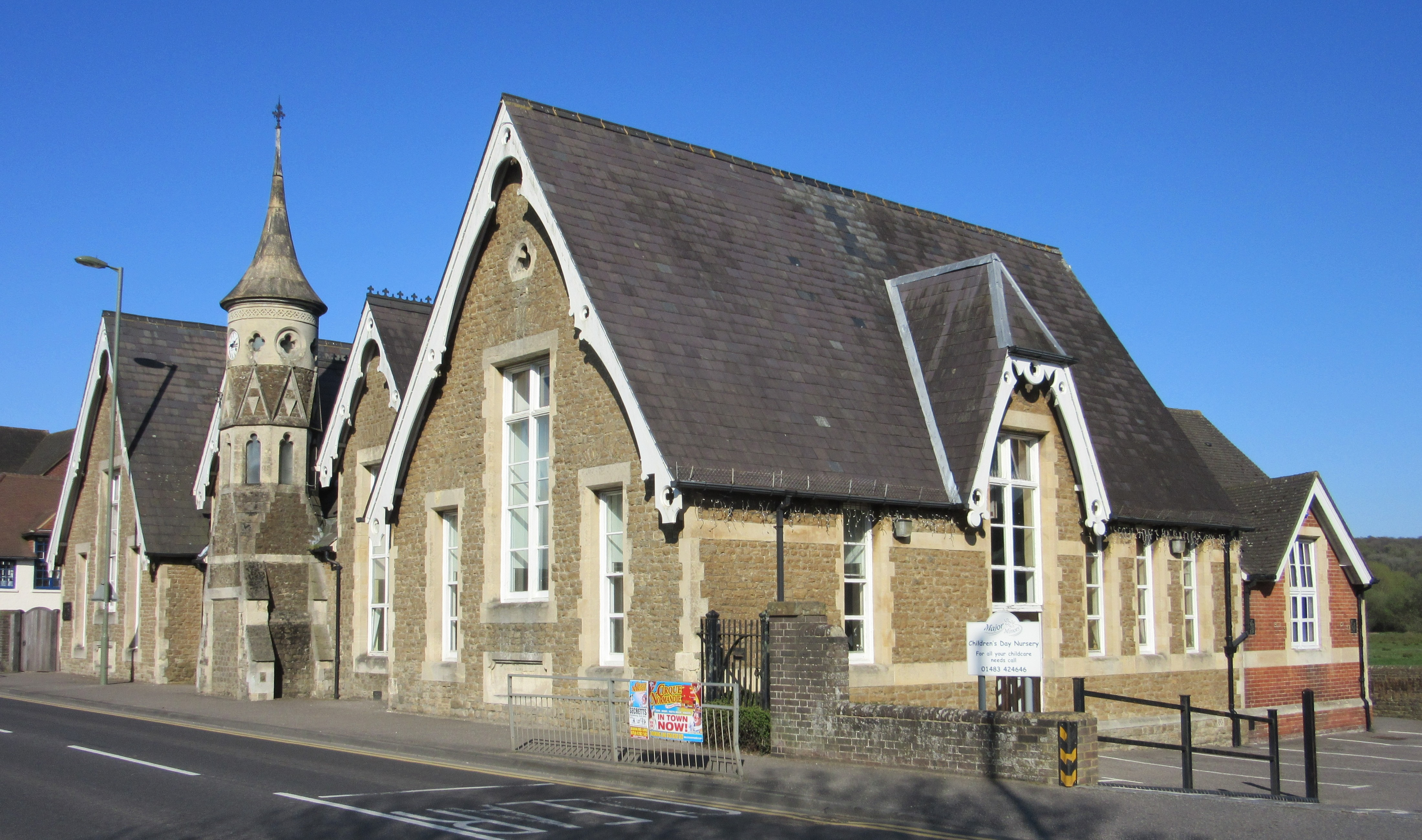
The former British school on Bridge Road

There are thought to have been dame schools operating in Godalming in the 16th and 17th centuries, but the first surviving reference to formal education in the town is from 1715, in which a school for 50 poor boys is recorded. The National school opened in Mint Road in February 1813 and moved to the former workhouse in Moss Lane in 1843. The workhouse buildings were demolished in 1910 and new classrooms were constructed on the same site. The school moved to new premises on Franklyn Road in the early 1970s and was renamed to become St Mark's School. A further change of name took place in 2008 and the school is now known as Green Oak School.

A British school opened in Hart's Yard in December 1812, but moved to Bridge Road in February the following year. It educated children between the ages of 6 and 13. The premises were rebuilt in 1872 and are now occupied by the Busy Bees nursery school. Busbridge School was founded in 1865 and three years later it became a National school. In 1868 there were 64 children on the roll, but by 1906, the school had 166 pupils.

St John's School, Farncombe opened in 1856; both the George Road and Meadrow Schools opened in 1906. Moss Lane County Primary School opened on the former workhouse site in 1975, but became an infants school in 1994.

=== Maintained schools ===
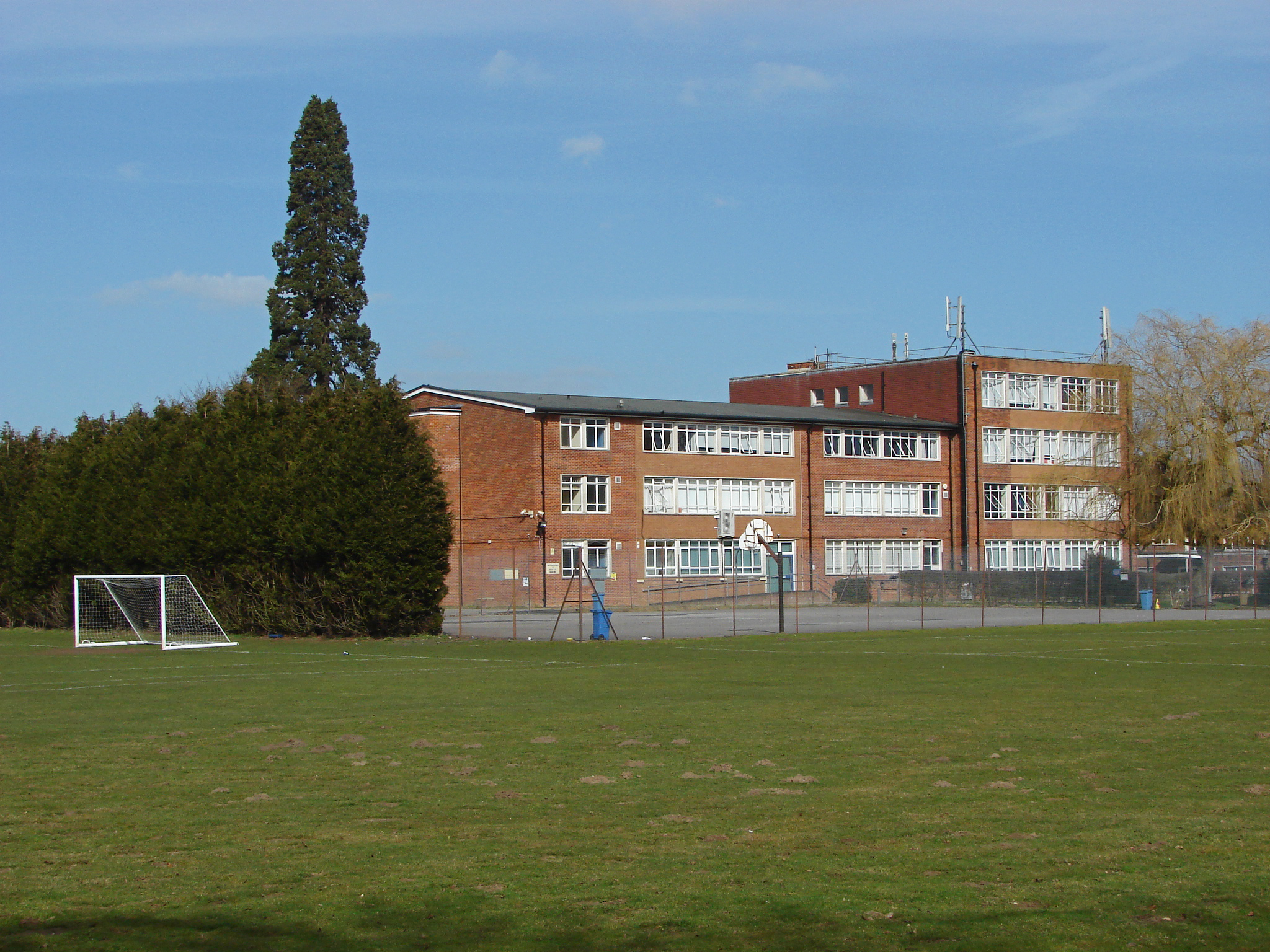
Broadwater School

Broadwater School, in the north of the civil parish, was established in 1967. It was built on part of the former Broadwater House estate. The school educates around 570 pupils aged from 11 to 16. It became part of the Greenshaw Learning Trust in September 2020.

Godalming College, to the south of the town centre, was founded in 1975 on the campus of the former Godalming Grammar School. It caters for 16–19-year-olds and is state maintained. The Performing Arts Centre was opened in March 2008 and the English and Modern Foreign Languages Centre was opened in September 2016.

=== Independent schools ===
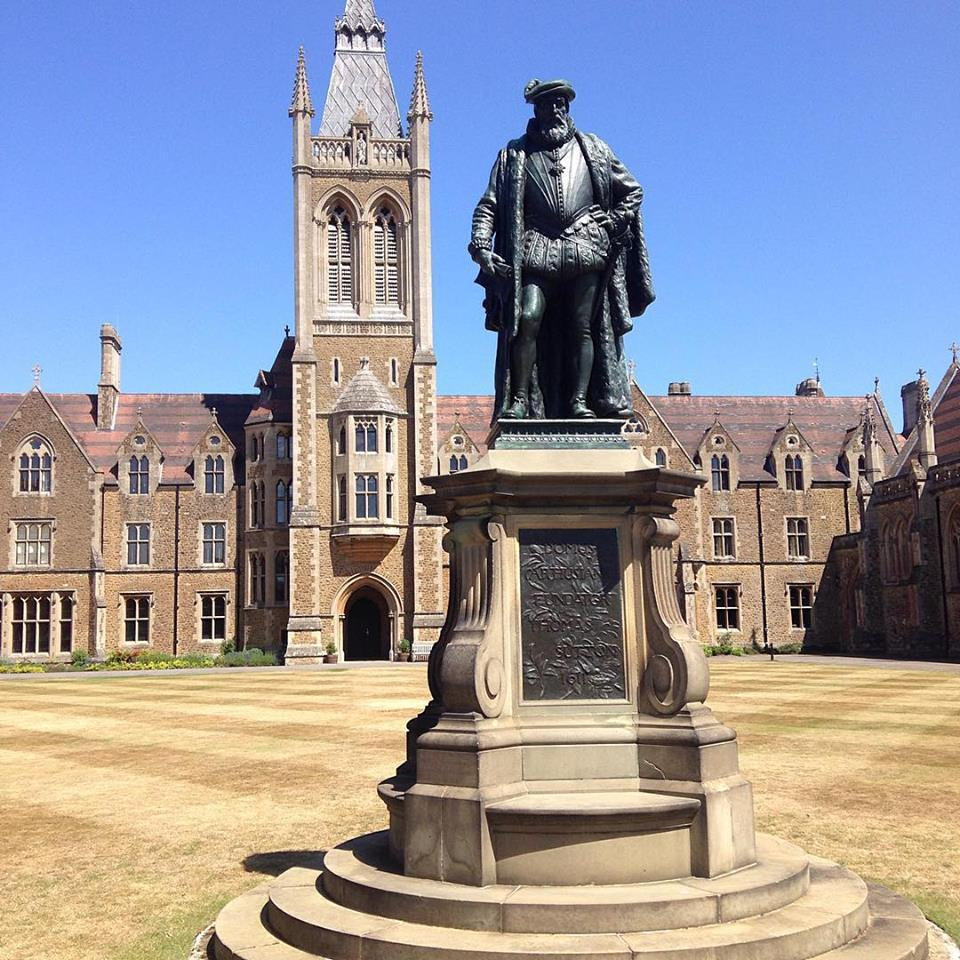
Statue of Thomas Sutton on Founder's Court at Charterhouse School

Charterhouse School was founded in 1611 in a former Carthusian monastery near Smithfield in London and relocated to Godalming in 1872. The main school buildings were designed by the architect, Philip Charles Hardwick, and the chapel, by Giles Gilbert Scott, was erected in 1927 as a memorial to former pupils who had died in the First World War. Initially the school was for boys only but, from 1971, girls were accepted into the sixth form. Girls were first admitted into Year 9 in 2021 and the school became fully coeducational in September 2023.

St Hilary's School is an independent preparatory school for boys and girls aged 2–11. It was founded in Tuesley Lane in August 1927 and moved to its present site on Holloway Hill in 1936. The nursery department opened in 1946 and the school became a limited company in 1965. In November 2024, the school merged with St Edmund's School, Hindhead.

== Places of worship ==
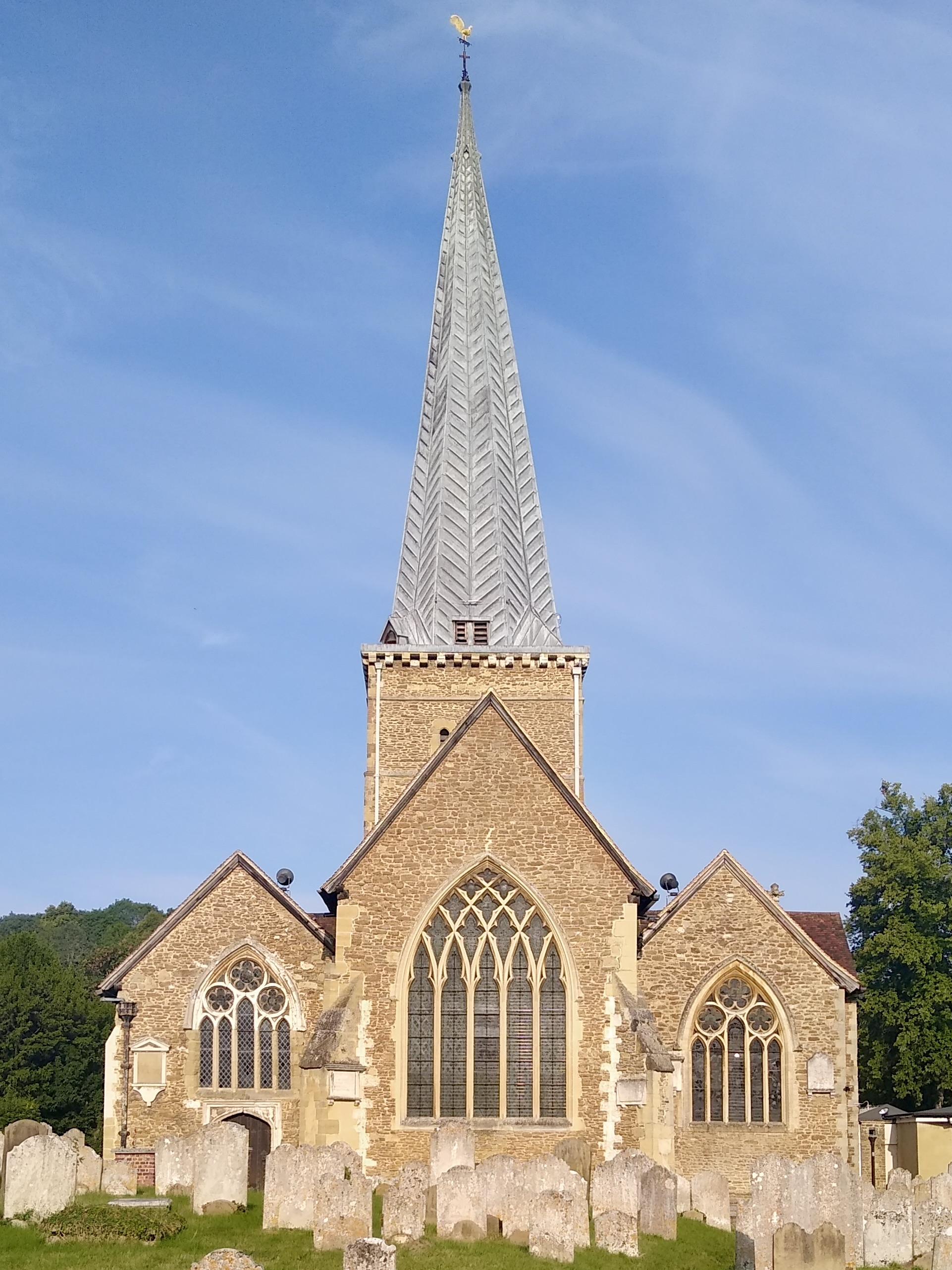
Parish Church of St Peter and St Paul

The oldest parts of the Parish Church of St Peter and St Paul date from the 9th century. The location of the church, on a sandstone knoll above the River Wey floodplain, is thought to have been the site of the original settlement of Godalming. By the early 11th century, the church is thought to have consisted of a nave and chancel; transepts and a tower were added in the early Norman period. A major rebuilding took place in the 13th century, which included the addition of a spire. The church owes its present appearance to restoration and remodelling work by George Gilbert Scott in the 19th century. The interior of the building includes the font, dated to the 15th or early 16th century, the carved wooden pulpit from c. 1600 and the parish chest from c. 1200. A daughter church, St Mark's, was opened in 1934.

Monthly Quaker meetings are thought to have been taking place in Binscombe by 1656, when the Dissenter George Fox is known to have preached there. The burial ground in the village was in use from 1659 until 1790. A lending library for Quakers was established in Godalming in 1676 and the Meeting House on Mill Lane was built in the 1710s. The building retains much of its original interior, including wooden panelling and fixed benches. The writer, Mary Waring, was an Elder of the meeting and kept a diary of her religious experiences.

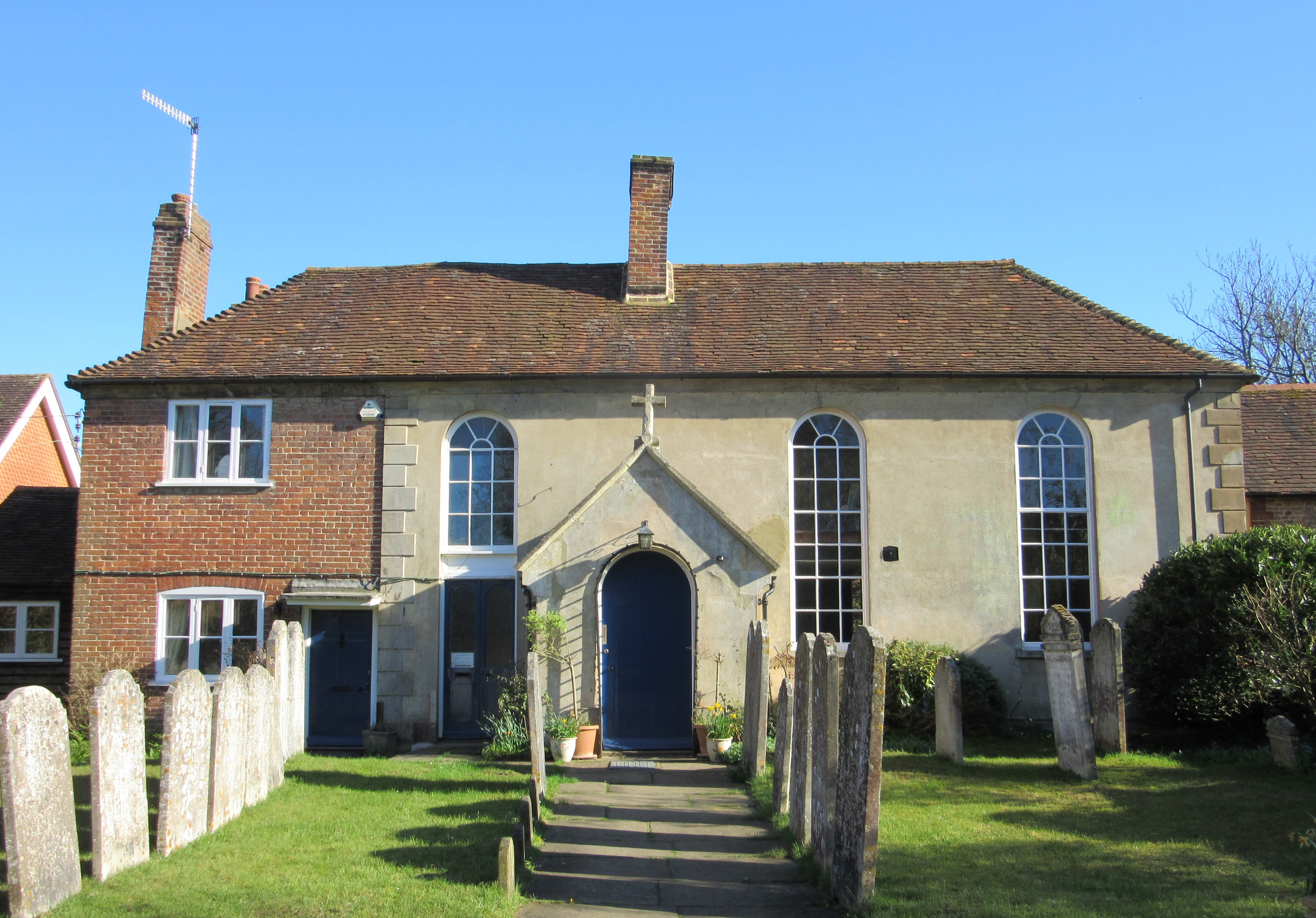
Meadrow Unitarian Chapel

Meadrow Unitarian Chapel, on the north side of the River Wey, was opened in 1789 as a General Baptist chapel. The building included a baptistry equipped with a pool suitable for immersion baptism. In the early 19th century, the congregation began to embrace Unitarianism. Religious services moved to a new building in 1870, but returned to the original chapel in the mid-1970s.

Although John Wesley visited the town four times, attempts in the late 18th century to establish Methodism in Godalming were unsuccessful. The current congregation traces its origins to a group that began meeting in the High Street in 1826 and that later moved to the former Congregational Church in Hart Lane in 1869. A second relocation to the Bridge Road Church, named after the religious reformer Hugh Price Hughes, opened in 1903. (Note: The Hart Lane Church was leased to The Salvation Army in 1903 and sold to them in 1917. The building was known as the Salvation Army Hall until 2012, when it ceased to be used as a church and was converted to offices.)

Busbridge Parish Church was designed by George Gilbert Scott in the Early English style and was consecrated in 1867. The windows at the west end were designed by Edward Burne-Jones and the wrought-iron chancel screen was designed by Edwin Lutyens.

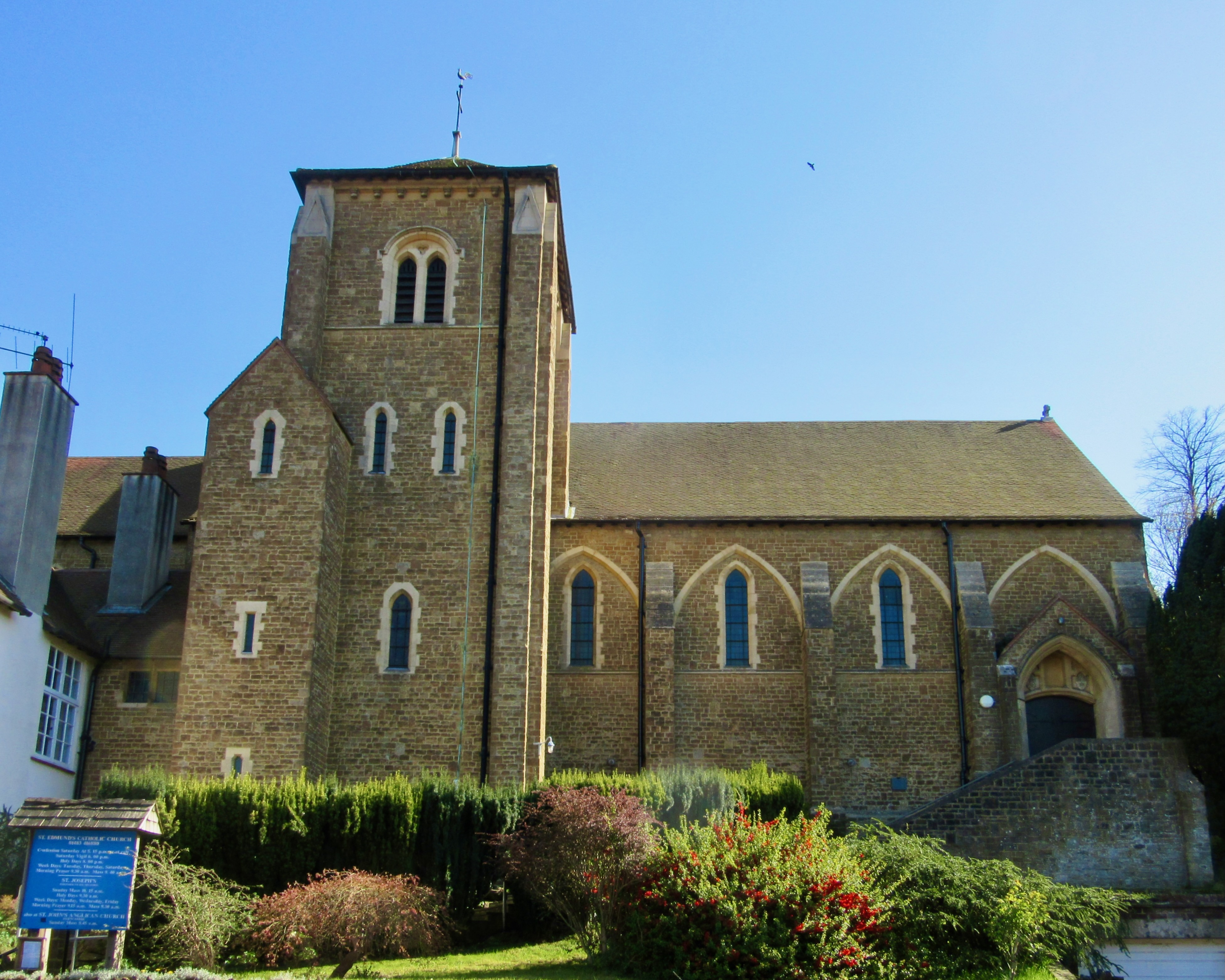
The Catholic Church of St Edmund King and Martyr, Croft Road

The first Catholic church in the town was a temporary iron church, erected in Croft Road in 1899. The Godalming parish was created in 1904 and the first priest was appointed in November of that year. The foundation stone of the new church, St Edmund's, was laid in November 1905 and construction was completed in June 1906. The grade II-listed building was designed by Frederick Walters in the Early English style.

== Culture ==
=== Art ===
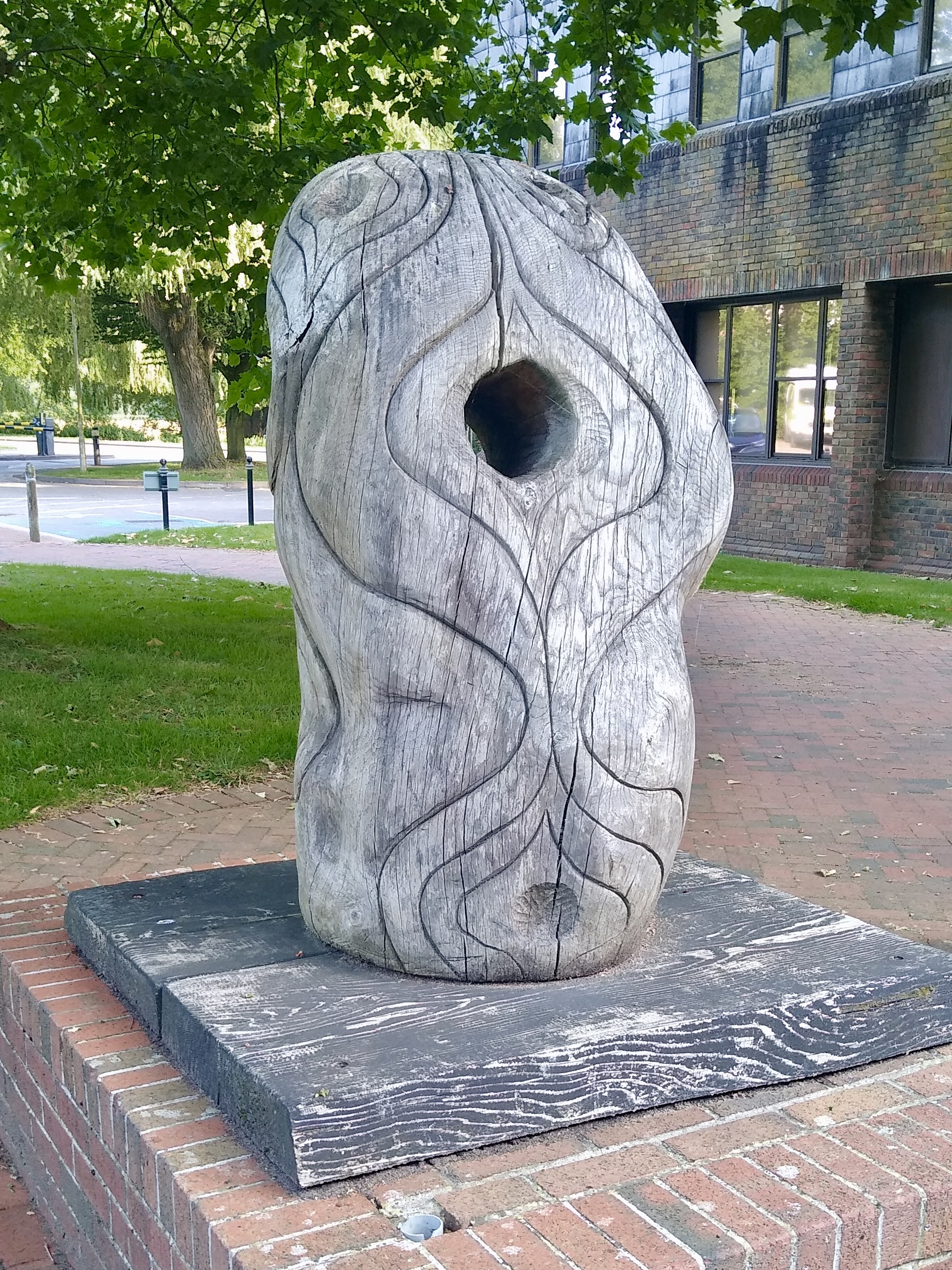
Tribal by Ruth Wheeler – on display outside the Waverley Borough Council offices

Godalming Museum owns paintings by James Peel and Gertrude Jekyll as well as a sculpture of the artist, George Frederic Watts, by Louis Reid Deuchars. The collection also includes portraits of Thomas Henry Huxley and Jack Phillips by John Collier and Ellis Martin respectively. The Tate holds an oil painting by J. M. W. Turner entitled Godalming from the South, dated to 1805; the gallery also holds two pencil sketches of the town skyline by the same artist.

=== Literature, film and television ===
In Charles Dickens' novel Nicholas Nickleby, Nicholas and Smike stay the night in Godalming, en route from London to Portsmouth: "To Godalming they came at last, and here they bargained for two humble beds, and slept soundly." Much of the action in Bulldog Drummond by Sapper takes place in Godalming. Binscombe features as a location in The Hog's Back Mystery (1933) by the detective-fiction writer Freeman Wills Crofts.

Ian Fleming's James Bond short story, Quantum of Solace, referred to Godalming as a venue for retired colonial civil servants with memories of postings to places "that no one at the local golf club would have heard about or would care about." In The Rose of Tibet (1962) by thriller writer, Lionel Davidson, two characters are described as talking "for hours" of a shared link with Godalming. In a somewhat "backhanded compliment", their exotic (and perilous) Tibetan location is held to be "All a long, long way from damp, soft Godalming with its mushy autumnal leaves underfoot and its dark green trains commuting to Waterloo." The comic novel The Return of Reginald Perrin, by David Nobbs, contains the following: "Note: It is believed that this book mentions Godalming more than any other book ever written, including A Social, Artistic and Economic History of Godalming by E. Phipps-Blythburgh."

The 2006 romantic comedy film, The Holiday, and the 2022 television series, Inside Man, include scenes filmed in Godalming.

=== Music and theatre ===
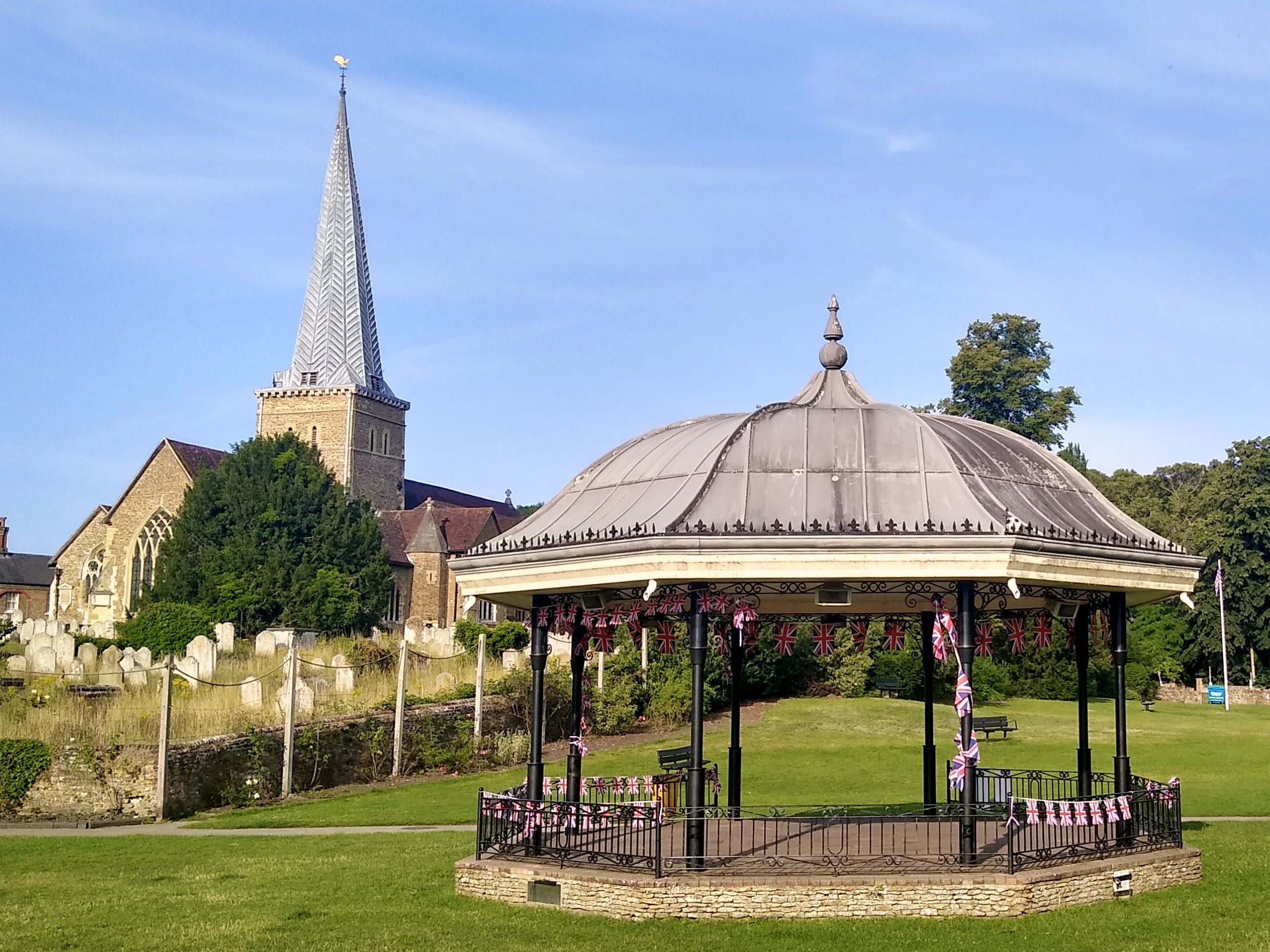
Godalming Bandstand in front of the parish church

Godalming Band has been active in its current form since 1937, but its predecessors operated in the town from c. 1844. The first performances took place to celebrate the coronation of George VI and Elizabeth. The first overseas trip, to one of Godalming's twin towns, Mayen, Germany, took place in 1979. The band performs regularly at local venues, including at the Godalming Bandstand.

The Godalming Youth Orchestra was founded in 1979 and welcomes players of orchestral instruments between the ages of 8 and 17. The Godalming Theatre Group was founded as the Youth Centre Theatre Group in 1964. It typically performs three times a year - a musical in the spring, a play in the autumn and a pantomime at Christmas. Local performances generally take place at Charterhouse School, but the group has toured internationally to Augusta, Mayen and Joigny.

== Sport ==
=== Leisure centre ===
Godalming Leisure Centre at Broadwater Park was opened in 2012, replacing the previous centre dating from the mid-1970s. It offers a 25 m pool, a teaching pool a fitness gym, a sauna and a soft play area.

=== Association football ===
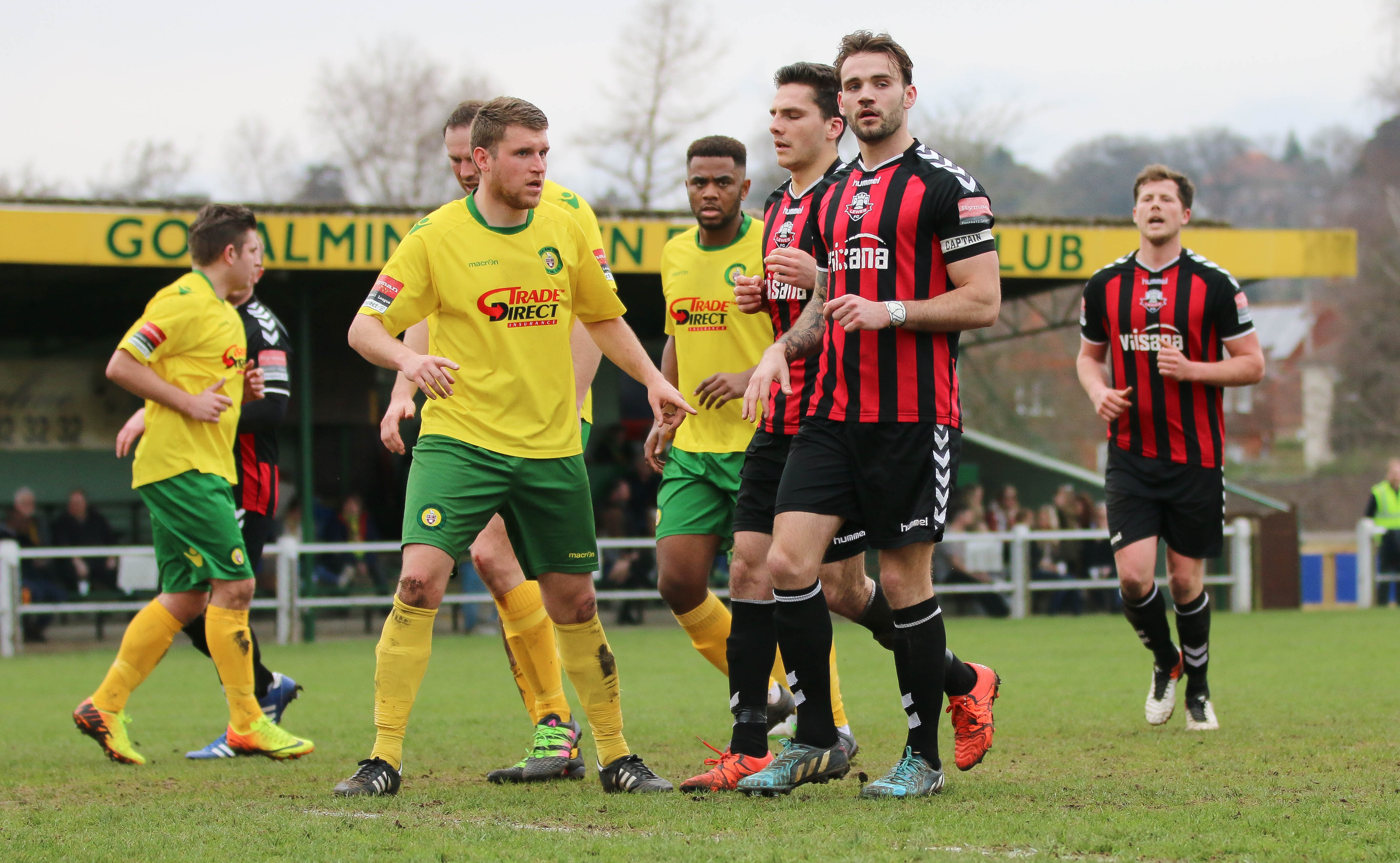
Godalming Town F.C. (green and yellow strip) take on Lewes F.C. at home in 2017

Godalming Town F.C. was founded as Godalming United F.C. in 1950 by former pupils of Godalming Grammar School. Originally, the team played its home games at the Holloway Hill Recreation Ground, but moved to Meadrow in Farncombe in 1970. The current stadium is named in memory of Bill Kyte, a former president and longstanding supporter of the club.

Old Carthusians F.C. was founded in 1876 by a group of former pupils of Charterhouse School. The team won the FA Cup in 1881 and the FA Amateur Cup three times in the 1890s. In 2022, the club is a member of the Arthurian League and the first team plays its home games at the school playing fields.

=== Cricket ===
Cricket is known to have been well established in Godalming by 1767 and the first definite reference to a Godalming team is from 1786. By 1883, the town team had begun playing at Holloway Hill Recreation Ground, then known as Whitehart Field. The present Godalming Cricket Club was constituted in 1926.

The first recorded cricket match at Broadwater Park took place in 1850 and a Surrey v Nottinghamshire county match took place there in 1854. Farncombe Cricket Club was founded on 6 April 1938 and played its first match on the 30th of the same month. The club has leased its home ground at Broadwater Park from the borough council from the outset. The first pavilion, a wooden building previously the staff living quarters of the Bramley Grange Hotel, was erected in 1949. It was replaced in the first half of 1972 and the new building was extended twice in the following decade to provide a larger social space.

=== Other sports ===
Guildford R.F.C. was formed in 2002, following a merger between Guildford & Godalming and Old Guildfordians rugby clubs. The first match as a single, combined team took place in September 2003 and the inaugural season was played in the then, London Division 3SW. The club plays its home games at the Broadwater Sports Club.

The Godalming Angling Society was formed in 1882. The club has rights to fish the 10-acre (4.0 ha) Broadwater lake and an 8 mi (13 km) stretch of the River Wey from Eashing to Guildford. Members can also fish at five other sites outside of the civil parish.

There are two flat green lawn bowls clubs in the civil parish. Holloway Hill Bowls Club plays at Holloway Hill Recreation Ground and Godalming and Farncombe Bowling Club plays at The Burys. The Godalming and Farncombe club was founded in 1867 and is the second oldest bowling club in Surrey.

== Notable buildings and landmarks ==
=== Community centres ===
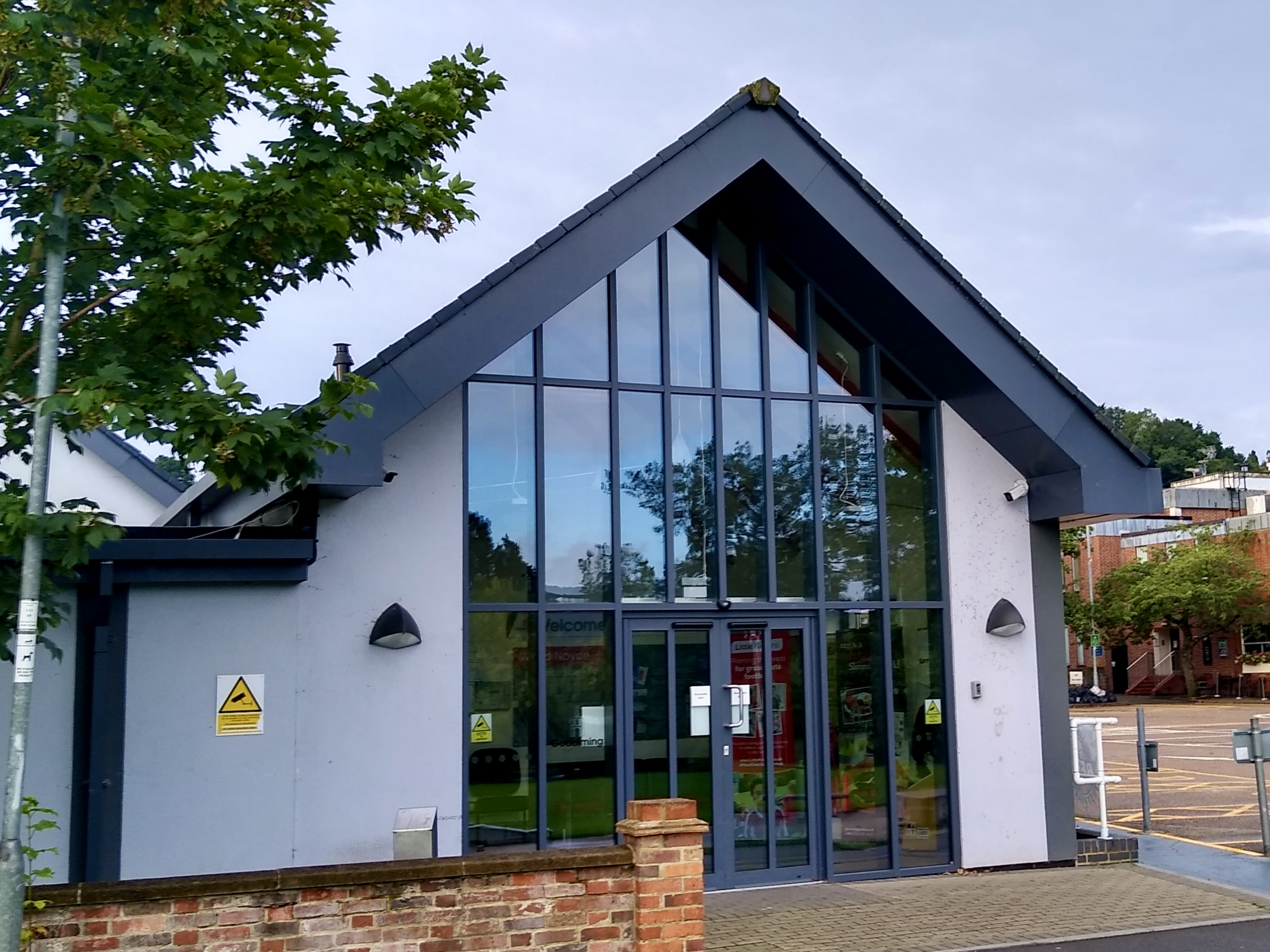
Wilfrid Noyce Centre

Godalming Youth Centre was opened by Wilfrid Noyce, a mountaineer and Charterhouse teacher and former pupil on 6 June 1962. He died in a climbing accident on 24 July of the same year and the centre was renamed in his memory. The centre was renovated between June 2015 and March 2016 to provide new catering facilities and tiered seating.

The Denningberg Centre was opened by Danny Denningberg, then Mayor of Godalming, in October 1974. It is the headquarters of the Godalming Old People's Welfare Association and functions as a day centre for the over-55s. It has been run by volunteers from the outset and houses a chiropody clinic and cafe.

The Old Mill, to the north of the High Street, is a day centre run by the National Autistic Society. It offers a range of activities and educational courses to those with autism.

=== Town halls and Godalming Museum ===
The former town hall, nicknamed The Pepperpot due to its cupola, is a distinctive octagonal building in the High Street. Located on the site of the medieval market house, its construction was funded by public donations. It was built in 1814, although the central stair tower was not added until in the 1890s. The ground floor is open and takes the form of a round-arched arcade. The upstairs rooms were used for borough council meetings until 1908.

Godalming Borough Hall, on Bridge Street, was built as a public hall in 1861. It was extended and rebuilt into the present borough hall in 1906 and the council began meeting in the purpose-built chamber in 1908.

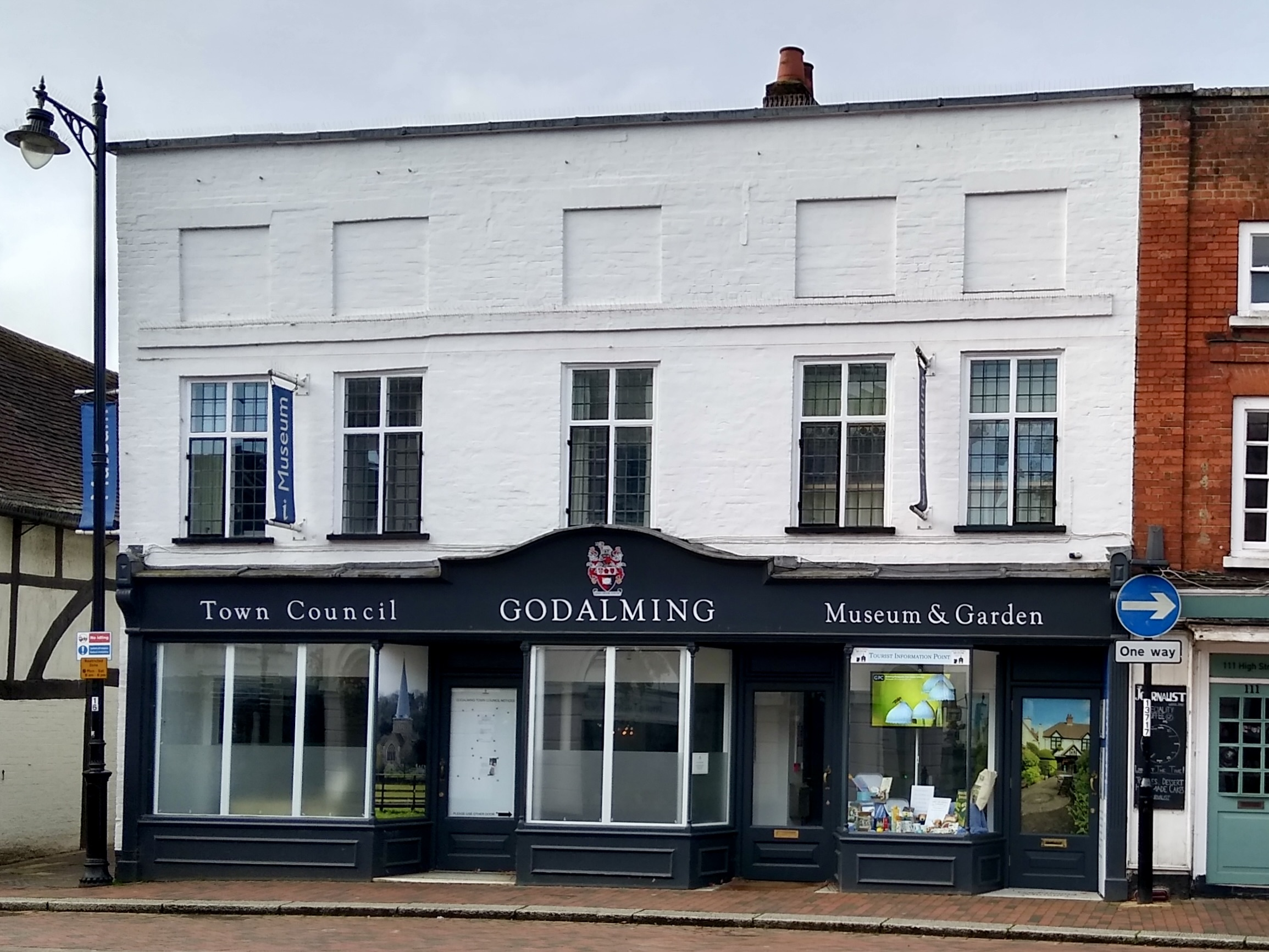
Godalming Museum

Godalming Museum opened in 1921 on the upper floor of The Pepperpot. It moved in November 1987 to 107–109 High Street, a timber-framed Wealden house dating from the 1440s. (Note: The brick façade of the museum, facing the High Street, is from the Georgian era.) The museum houses numerous artefacts relating to the history of the local area and the Arts and Crafts movement in south-west Surrey.

=== Memorials ===
The chief radio operator of RMS Titanic, Jack Phillips, was born and lived in Farncombe. After the ship struck an iceberg on the night of 14–15 April 1912, he remained at his post, sending repeated distress calls until the ship sank. Phillips was honoured by his home town through the construction of the Phillips Memorial Cloister, designed by Hugh Thackeray Turner, and a garden by Gertrude Jekyll. A brass plaque was also installed in Farncombe church. The cloister was restored in time for the 100th anniversary of the sinking in 2012.

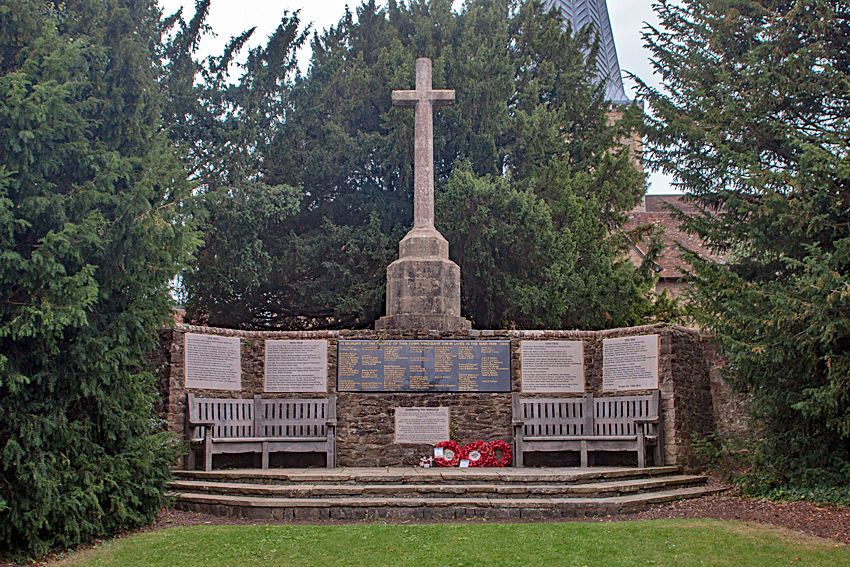
Godalming War Memorial

Godalming War Memorial, dedicated in 1921, was designed by the architect, Albert Powys. It takes the form of a Latin cross, set on top of the northern retaining wall of the churchyard of St Peter and St Paul parish church. The names of the 109 local residents who died in the Second World War are recorded beneath the cross. Those who died in the First World War are remembered on plaques inside the church.

Busbridge War Memorial, in the churchyard of the Church of St John the Baptist, was designed by Edwin Lutyens. It is constructed of Portland stone and takes the form of a 7 m-tall (23 ft) cross. It was dedicated in July 1922 and the names of those who died in the First and Second World Wars are recorded on plaques inside the church.

=== Other notable buildings ===
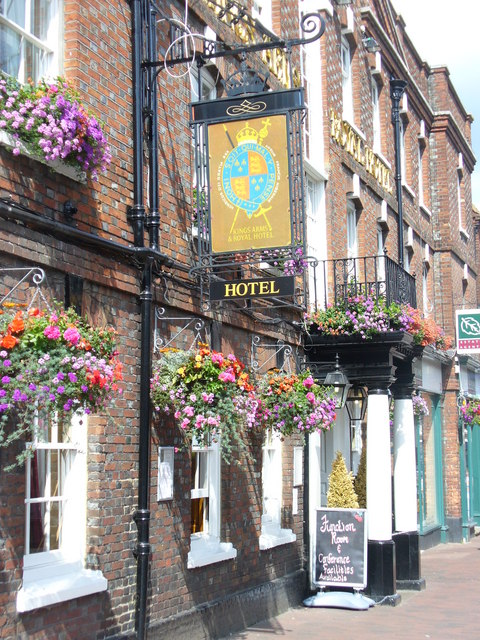
The King's Arms and Royal Hotel

The King's Arms and Royal Hotel, in the High Street, is a former coaching inn and is first recorded in the 17th century. In 1698, Peter the Great stayed at the inn with his entourage, while travelling from Portsmouth to London. A contemporary account, held by the Bodleian Library, records the vast amount of food and drink consumed. A plaque was unveiled in 1998 by the Russian Ambassador to the UK, to mark the 300th anniversary of the Czar's visit. Much of the hotel dates from the mid-18th century, including the brick Georgian frontage, constructed in 1753. Some of the interior panelling is from the 17th century, although it is thought to have been refitted in a later refurbishment.

The Red House, on Frith Hill, was built in 1899 by the architect, Edwin Lutyens, for a retired housemaster of Charterhouse School. It is constructed of red brick in a Flemish bond with a plain tile roof and leaded-light windows. Its position, on a sloping hillside, required the front of the building to have two storeys, but the rear has four. The principal internal feature is the central, open-well staircase and the original decoration on the handrail is still visible. The Red House has been described as "an early seminal work by Lutyens".

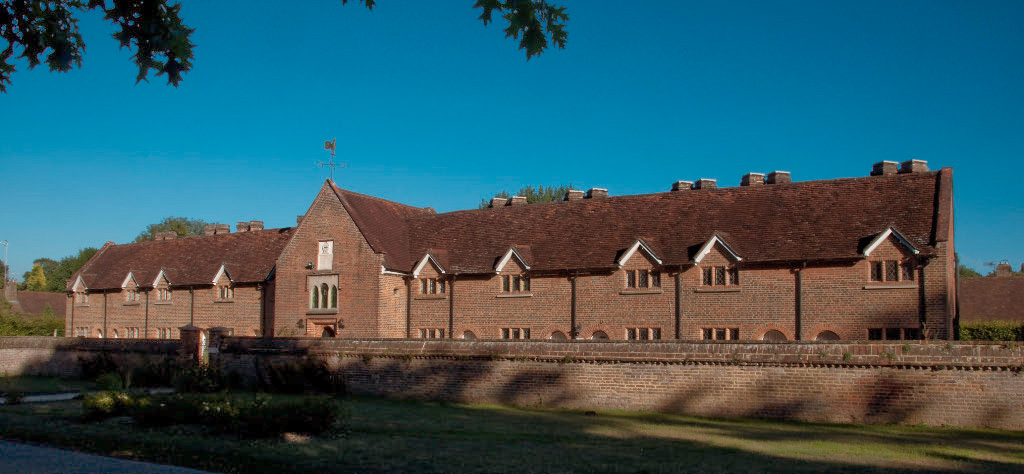
Wyatt's Almshouses

Wyatt's Almshouses were built in 1622 for Richard Wyatt, the Master Carpenter of the Carpenters' Company in London. Wyatt stipulated that accommodation should be offered to ten poor men of the parishes of Godalming, Puttenham, Hambledon, Compton and Dunsfold. A chapel was also provided for the use of residents. The ten dwellings were converted into eight apartments in 1959 and new bungalows surrounding the original building were added in the 1960s.

== Parks and open spaces ==
=== Broadwater Park ===
The 29 ha (72-acre) Broadwater Park is a mixed-use recreation ground to the north-east of Farncombe. For much of its history, the area was owned by the More Molyneux family of Loseley House and the first record of cricket being played there is from 1827. The estate, including the cricket ground, was sold in 1836 to the timber merchant, George Marshall, for the site of Broadwater House. The property remained in the Marshall family until the early 20th century, when it was bought by George Edward Price, a director of the Canadian firm, Price Brothers Ltd. During the First World War, the house was used to accommodate Belgian refugees and the lake was used as an ice rink by Canadian soldiers, who were billeted at Witley Camp.

In 1936, the estate was purchased by Mr W. Hoptroff, a local builder, who in turn offered some of the land to the borough for use as a recreation area. In November of that year, an area of 1.8 ha (4.4 acres), including the cricket ground, were bought by P. C. Fletcher, the Mayor of Godalming, and presented to the town. In December 1938, an area of 13.3 ha (33 acres) was designated a King George's Field. In 2022, the park is owned by the borough council and includes areas of woodland and grassland, a multi-use games area, football pitches and tennis courts.

=== Other open spaces ===
The Lammas Lands are a 31.8 ha (79-acre) area of floodplain on the north bank of the River Wey between the town centre and Farncombe. From medieval times until the early 19th century, the area was managed as a hay meadow and, once the grass had been cut around Lammas Day (1 August), local residents were permitted to graze their cattle until Candlemas (1 February) the following year. These rights of common were extinguished in with the 1808 Act of Inclosure, but at least two of the dole stones, which formerly denoted individual plots of land, survive. Today the Lammas Lands are designated a Site of Nature Conservation Interest and are mostly owned by the borough council. A 1994 survey noted the presence of over 108 species of flowering plants, including black knapweed, meadow saxifrage, marsh marigold and water mint. Some 227 types of invertebrate were recorded in 2001, including populations of reed beetle on the banks of the Wey, whirligig beetle in Hell Ditch and click beetle in areas with taller grasses.

Holloway Hill Recreation Ground, originally known as Whitehart Field, was purchased by the Godalming Recreation Club Company in 1896. It has been used as a cricket field since before 1883 and, in 1885, sports being played there include football, quoits and tennis. During the First World War, the ground was dug up for allotments and in 1921 the town council bought the land from the company. Since June 2015, the 5.87 ha (14.5-acre) ground has been protected by the charity Fields in Trust under their Queen Elizabeth II Fields scheme.

== Notable people ==
See also alumni of Godalming Grammar School and List of notable Old Carthusians

- Jonas Moore (1617–1679) mathematician, surveyor and ordnance officer – died at Godalming
- John Balchen (1670–1744) Admiral of the White, Royal Navy – was born and lived in Godalming until he joined the navy at the age of 15
- James Oglethorpe (1696–1785) army officer and founder of the Colony of Georgia – was born in Godalming and lived at Westbrook Place
- Mary Toft (c. 1703–1763) convinced medical professionals that she had given birth to rabbits – born, lived and died in Godalming
- Owen Manning (1721–1801) clergyman and historian of Surrey – was vicar of Godalming from 1763 until his death
- George Barrett (1752–1821) actuary – lived in Godalming from 1816 until his death
- James Inskipp (1790–1868) artist – lived for the latter part of his life in Catteshall Lane
- Joseph Dando (1806–1894) violinist and viola player – lived at Attwell Cottage, Peperharow Road from 1875 until his death
- Alfred Russel Wallace (1823–1913) biologist and critic – lived in Godalming from 1881 to 1889
- Julius Caesar (1830–1878) cricketer – born, lived and died in Godalming
- Thomas Page (1850–1936) classicist and schoolmaster – served for 30 years on Godalming Town Council, was a founder of Godalming Grammar School, died at his home on Frith Hill
- Philip Cardew (1851–1910) army officer in the Royal Engineers and pioneer of electrical engineering – died at Crownpits House, Godalming
- Ernest Irving (1878–1953) musical director and composer – born and lived in Godalming as a child
- George Mallory (1886–1924) teacher and mountaineer – lived at Frith Hill from 1910 until his death
- Jack Phillips (1887–1912) senior wireless operator on the RMS Titanic was born in Godalming and lived in the town as a child
- W. H. C. Romanis (1889–1972) surgeon and medical author – was born in Godalming and spent his childhood in the town
- Aldous Huxley (1894–1963) writer and philosopher – was born at Laleham, Peperharow Road and spent his childhood in Godalming (Note: Aldous Huxley's father, Leonard Huxley, was a teacher at Charterhouse School from 1884 to 1901, when the family lived at Laleham, Peperharow Road. His oldest brother, Julian Huxley, was born in London, but lived at the family home in Godalming as a child.)
- Milicent Bagot (1907–2006) British intelligence officer – lived at Jubilee Nursing Home from 2001 until her death
- Jane White (1934-1985) novelist
- Nick Clarke (1948–2006) broadcaster – was born in the town
- Mick Mills (b. 1949) England football team captain at the 1982 World Cup – born in Godalming
- Elspeth Beard (b. 1959) architect and motorcyclist – lives and works in Godalming
- Matt Parker (b. 1980) mathematician, author and comedian

== Bibliography ==
- Amey, Geoffrey (2000). Julius Caesar : the ill-fated cricketer. Bodyline Books. ISBN 978-0-95-383870-7.
- Bartlett, Robert (2020). Policing Rural Surrey: From the Distant Past to the First World War. Robert Bartlett. Archived from the original on 15 May 2021.
- Cavallini, Rob (2005). The Wanderers F.C. Dog N Duck. ISBN 978-0-95-504960-6. Archived from the original on 10 February 2023.
- Chapman Davies, Helen (2004). The Guildford Union Workhouse and the Vagrants' Casual Ward. Guildford: Guildford Museum. ISBN 978-0-95-437531-7.
- Coates, Nigel (1995). Godalming : A pictorial history. Chichester: Phillimore. ISBN 978-0-85-033983-3.
- Coombes, David (1987). Memories of Farncombe and Godalming (2nd ed.). Godalming: Godalming Trust.
- Crocker, Glenys (1999). Surrey's Industrial Past. Guildford: Surrey Industrial History Group. ISBN 978-0-95-239188-3.
- Crocker, Glenys, ed. (2003). A guide to the industrial history of the Borough of Waverley. Guildford: Surrey Industrial History Group. ISBN 978-0-95-381221-9.
- Crofts, Freeman Willis (1933). The Hog's Back Mystery. London: Hodder and Stoughton.
- Crook, Paul (2000). Surrey Home Guard. Midhurst: Middleton Press. ISBN 1-901-70657-5.
- Davidson, Lionel (2016) [1962]. The Rose of Tibet. London: Faber and Faber. ISBN 978-0-57-132682-2.
- Dedman, Stanley C. (1972). The early history of Godalming from Saxon times. Godalming: Godalming Museum.
- Dickens, Charles (1839). The life and adventures of Nicholas Nickleby. London: Chapman and Hall.
- Dines, H.G.; Edmunds, F.H.; Chatwin, C.P. (1929). The geology of the country around Aldershot and Guildford : Explanation of one-inch geological sheet 286, new series. London: British Geological Survey. Archived from the original on 2 June 2022.
- Fleming, Ian (2006) [1960]. Quantum of Solace : The complete James Bond short stories. London: Penguin. ISBN 978-0-14-118962-8.
- Gover, J.E.B.; Mawer, A.; Stenton, F.M. (1969). The place-names of Surrey. Cambridge: Cambridge University Press.
- Hadfield, Charles (1969). The Canals of South and South-East England. David and Charles. ISBN 978-0-71-534693-8.
- Haig-Brown, Hilda (1990). Frith Hill then and now.
- Harrison, E. E. (1971). Dedman, Stanley C. (ed.). Godalming : Natural features and the dawn of history. Godalming: Godalming Museum.
- Harvey, Adrian (2005). Football, the First Hundred Years. London; New York: Routledge. p. 23. ISBN 978-0-41-535018-1.
- Head, Ronald E. (1984). Godalming in old picture postcards. Vol. 1. Zaltbommel: European Library. ISBN 978-9-02-883103-2.
- Head, Ronald E. (1994). Godalming in old picture postcards. Vol. 3. Zaltbommel: European Library. ISBN 978-9-02-885917-3.
- Head, Ronald, ed. (2001). Godalming : A photographic history of your town. Salisbury: Black Horse Books. ISBN 978-1-90-403341-7.
- Head, Ronald E. (2005). Godalming. Salisbury: Francis Frith Collection. ISBN 978-1-85-937976-9.
- Hills, Mollie; Bailes, Howard (2002). St Hilary's School Godalming : A history of its first seventy-five years. Godalming: St Hilary's School.
- Horbrough, J. E., ed. (1985). Local history of Godalming. Guildford: University of Surrey.
- Janaway, John (1987). Yesterday's Town : Godalming. Buckingham: Barracuda Books. ISBN 978-0-86-023291-9.
- Janaway, John (1993). Godalming : A Short History. Godalming: Ammonite Books. ISBN 978-1-86-986608-2.
- Jekyll, Gertrude (1904). Old West Surrey. London: Longmans, Green and Co. OCLC 1147789541.
- Larner, H. M. (1947). Busbridge, Godalming, Surrey. Cambridge: St Tibbs Press.
- McNeile, H. C. (1920). Bull-Dog Drummond : The adventures of a demobilised officer who found peace dull. London: Hodder & Stoughton. OCLC 562338129.
- Mayne, P. J. (1992). Godalming Cricket Club: A history of cricket in the area since 1767, including the career of Julius Caesar. Godalming: Godalming Cricket Club. OCLC 34903301.
- Mills, A.D. (2003). Oxford Dictionary of British Place Names. Oxford: Oxford University Press. ISBN 978-0-19-852758-9.
- Mitchell, Vic; Smith, Keith (1985). Woking to Portsmouth. Midhurst: Middleton Press. ISBN 978-0-90-652025-3.
- Newman, Barry (1988). A History of Farncombe Cricket Club: 1938-1988 at Broadwater Park. Godalming: Farncombe Cricket Club.
- Nobbs, David (1990) [1977]. The Return of Reginald Perrin. London: Mandarin. ISBN 978-0-74-930469-0.
- Nyazai, Maureen (1994). The best days of their lives : A history of Busbridge School, Godalming. Godalming: Busbridge Books. ISBN 978-0-95-238260-7.
- Polack, Bernard; Whitbourn, John (1999). The Catholic Parish of St Edmund King & Martyr, Godalming, 1899–1999. Farnham: Arrow Press.
- Shore, Thomas William (1906). Shore, T. W. Jr; Shore, L. E. (eds.). Origin of the Anglo-Saxon Race: A Study of the Settlement of England and the Tribal Origin of the Old English People. London: Stock, Elliot. OCLC 1147855231.
- Stamp, Gavin; Goulancourt, André (1986). The English House, 1860-1914 : The Flowering of English Domestic Architecture. London: Faber. ISBN 978-0-57-113047-4.
- Stell, Christopher (2002). Nonconformist Chapels and Meeting-houses in Eastern England. Swindon: English Heritage. ISBN 1-873592-50-7.
- Stock, Peter (1993). From Workhouse to Workbook. Godalming: Moss Lane County First School.
- Stock, Peter (1999). Hidden Nonconformity: A Study of Nonconformity in the Godalming Area from the 17th Century. Farnham: Arrow Press.
- Vine, P.A.L (1996). London's Lost Route to the Sea (6th ed.). Newton Abbot: David and Charles. ISBN 978-1-87-379378-7.
- Wardle, Alan (2003). The Wey Navigations : An Historical Guide. Guildford: Surrey Industrial History Group. ISBN 978-0-95-381222-6.
