= Jane White (novelist) =

English novelist

Jane White (1934 - 1985) was an English novelist.

White was born in Cambridge in 1934, where her father was a lecturer in History at Downing College. The family moved to Norfolk, where Jane was taught at home by a governess until the age of nine, thereafter attending a Convent boarding school. At eighteen she won a state scholarship to Girton College, Cambridge, graduating with an upper second degree in English. She worked in a public library, was a waitress, a general help in a maternity hospital, then for five years a News Clerk in the News Information Department at the BBC World Service. On the 10th of May 1960, her short story Boy with a Dog was read by actor David Enders as the 'Morning Story' on the BBC Light Programme. In 1961, White married Philip Brady, a lecturer in German at Birkbeck College; they had one son, Martin, and lived in Godalming, Surrey.

White's first novel, Quarry, was published in the UK by Michael Joseph in 1967. Reviewing for The Sunday Times, Kay Dick wrote "It is a considerable achievement, most absorbing, impeccably self-assured... will be compared in some measure to Lord of the Flies, because it deals with the imaginative violence of the young... Quarry is obviously unusual, and Jane White's talent as obviously undeniable". Patrick Anderson, reviewing the novel in The Spectator, wrote "This, let it be said at once, is a really remarkable first novel. I haven't been so moved and frightened and ultimately disgusted in years. Three splendidly differentiated grammar-school boys, the elegant and sophisticated Todd, the sex-sodden, creepily tidy Randy, and the plodding, cheerful Carter, capture a small boy and keep him, an eerily willing victim, in a cave."

White's novels were published in the US by Harcourt Brace, and Harper & Row.

Quarry, Proxy, and Beatrice, Falling were republished in paperback in the UK by Panther, Quarry in the USA by Macfadden-Bartell.

Following renewed interest in White, Quarry was republished in paperback by Boiler House Press, with an introduction by Anne Billson, as part of their 'Recovered Books' series in 2023.

White was diagnosed with Multiple Sclerosis in 1979.

== Bibliography ==
- Quarry (1967, Michael Joseph)
- Proxy (1968, Michael Joseph)
- Beatrice, Falling (1969, Michael Joseph)
- Retreat in Good Order (1970, Michael Joseph)
- Left for Dead (1971, Michael Joseph)
- Norfolk Child (1973, Michael Joseph) (Non-fiction; childhood memoir.)
- Comet (1975, Hamish Hamilton)
- Benjamin's Open Day (1979, Hamish Hamilton)
