= Aaron's Hill =

Coordinates: 51.17°N 0.64°W

Aarons Hill: Aarons Hill
- Suburb
- Location within Surrey
- Population: 338
- OS grid reference: SU9543
  - London: 30.5 miles (49.1 km)
- Civil parish: Godalming
- District: Waverley
- Shire county: Surrey
- Region: South East
- Country: England
- Sovereign state: United Kingdom
- Post town: GODALMING
- Postcode district: GU7
- Dialling code: 01483
- Police: Surrey
- Fire: Surrey
- Ambulance: South East Coast
- UK Parliament: Godalming and Ash

Aarons Hill is a suburb of Godalming in Surrey, England. It is named after the hill it sits on and has a road named after it. Aaron's Hill is adjacent to another suburb, Ockford Ridge and also to Ockford Wood, it is located in the western end of Godalming and slightly further west is the village of Eashing and the A3 trunk road. Aarons Hill is elevated 76 metres above sea level and is located in the Borough of Waverley.

Aarons Hill has a population of 338.

== Geography ==
Aarons Hill, as the name suggests, is on a hill. From the main road, Eashing Lane, there is a single road also named Aarons Hill, which leads to the suburb. From the road there are many cul-de-sacs and loops, where most of the housing is located. The main road has most of the amenities and businesses in Aarons Hill. Near to the suburb are a couple of walking trails.

== History ==
The Aarons Hill development was built after the Second World War, on the site of the former Ockford House.

== Amenities ==
Aarons Hill contains various shops and amenities. On the main road, there is a skate park, as well as a stonework and landscaping facility and a primary school. Further south there's a church and a cemetery, although this is officially part of Ockford Ridge. The newer part is mostly a mixed-use development and includes an estate agent and beauty supply and sportswear shops.

== Transport ==
Aarons Hill is served by two local bus routes, the 71 and the 72. The 71 route runs along Eashing Lane only stopping once within the community, whilst the 72 route runs along some of the smaller streets and serves the local area. These also run towards Godalming Railway Station, with trains to Guildford, Woking, London, Haslemere and Portsmouth.
