= W. H. C. Romanis =

British surgeon and medical author (1889–1972)

William Hugh Cowie Romanis FRSE MRSC FRCSE (8 November 1889 – 25 January 1972) was a 20th-century British surgeon and medical author. He was a pioneer of thoracic surgery in the 1920s. Friends and colleagues knew him as Hugo Romanis.

== Life ==
He was born in Godalming on 8 November 1889 the first son of Rev Francis William Romanis, preacher to Charterhouse School, and his wife, Annie Ellen Cowie. William was educated at Charterhouse School.

He went to Trinity College, Cambridge, originally to read Mathematics than transferring to Natural Sciences in 1911. Getting a new-found interest in medicine he went to St Thomas' Hospital in London for some clinical training, gaining a Diploma in 1914.

He served the first six months of the First World War as a casualty officer at St Thomas before joining the Royal Army Medical Corps, serving in France at No.6 and No. 44 Clearing Stations. He returned to St Thomas in the winter of 1917/18 to take on the role of surgical registrar, working with Sir Percy Sargent. In 1919 he became a consultant surgeon and began also to serve peripheral hospitals.

Around 1925 he succeeded Hugh Morriston Davies as consultant surgeon at the City of London Hospital for Diseases of the Heart and Lungs. He also became consultant to Tooting Neurological Hospital.

In 1926 he was elected a fellow of the Royal Society of Edinburgh. His proposers were Charles Stewart Hunter, Frederick William Price, John William Henry Eyre and Sir John Smith Flett. He resigned from the society in 1951.

He retired from active surgery in 1954.

With a parallel interest in law he served as a Justice of the Peace (JP) in Godalming. In 1954 he was additionally elected an advocate (aged 64).

He was county surgeon to the St John's Ambulance Brigade. He was an ardent freemason and supporter of the Freemason Hospital. He liked model railways and driving sports cars.

He died at home in Godalming on 25 January 1972.

== Family ==
In 1916 he married Dorothy Elizabeth Burnett, daughter of Rev Canon Robert Burnett of Ferns Cathedral in Ireland. They had one son and two daughters.

== Publications ==
- The Science and Practice of Surgery (1927 and later editions) with P H Mitchiner
- The Compleat Surgeon: The Autobiography of the Surgeon W H C Romanis
