= Farncombe railway station =

Railway station in Surrey, England

Farncombe
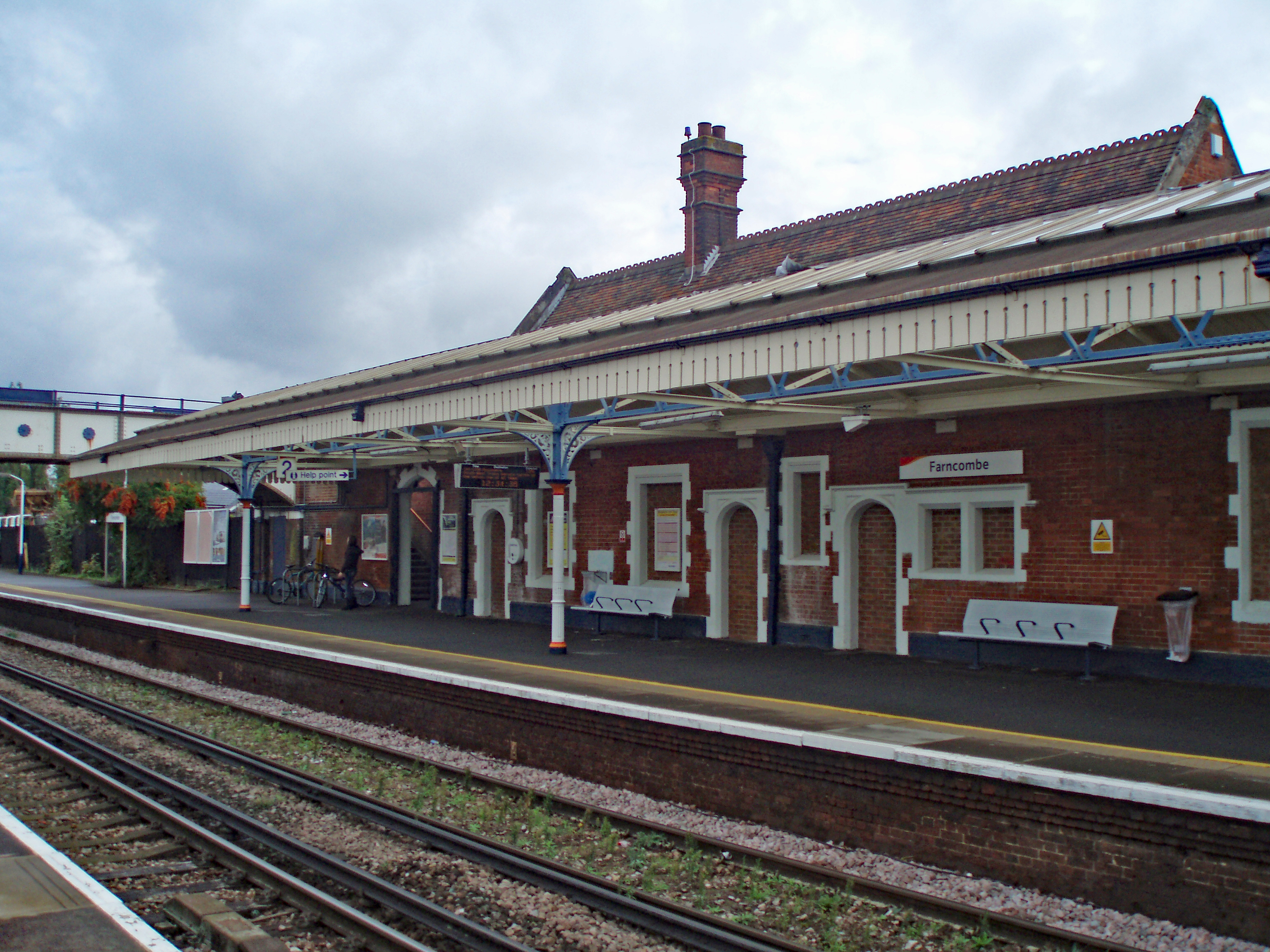

General information
- Location: Farncombe, Waverley; England
- Coordinates: 51°11′49″N 0°36′18″W
- Grid reference: SU976451
- Managed by: South Western Railway
- Platforms: 2

Other information
- Station code: FNC
- Classification: DfT category D

History
- Opened: 1897

Passengers
- 2020/21: ▼0.138 million
- 2021/22: ▲0.351 million
- 2022/23: ▲0.437 million
- 2023/24: ▲0.487 million
- 2024/25: ▲0.568 million
Location
Notes
- Passenger statistics from the Office of Rail and Road

Farncombe railway station opened in 1897 as a minor stop on the Portsmouth Direct Line between Guildford and Godalming, England. It is said to have been built at the instigation of General Sir Frederick Marshall, a director of the London and South Western Railway Company, who lived nearby at Broadwater.

== Location and facilities ==
The station lies in the centre of Farncombe, a northern suburb of Godalming. Nowadays it is served by South Western Railway on the line from Waterloo to Portsmouth Harbour, 33.5 miles (53.9 km) from Waterloo. Farncombe station is staffed most of the time, and has a café on platform 1. There are two full barrier level crossings at Farncombe, one at each end of the station. The two platforms are connected by an old, metal bridge. The main station buildings, along with the footbridge are Grade II listed.

The main station building has a long, low frontage with in a weak Tudor style. It is built from red brick with ashlar dressings and terminates in gabled pavilions. It has wide platforms, typical of LSWR stations from the era, when the London commuter market was growing rapidly. The footbridge connecting the two platforms is a plate girder. The bridge is decorated with sunflower motifs.

== Services ==
All services at Farncombe are operated by South Western Railway using Class 444 and 450 EMUs.

The typical off-peak service in trains per hour is:

- 2 tph to London Waterloo via Guildford
- 1 tph to Haslemere (all stations)
- 1 tph to Portsmouth Harbour (all stations except Milford and Witley)

The station is also served by a single evening service to Southampton Central.

Preceding station	National Rail	Following station
Guildford	South Western Railway Portsmouth Direct Line	Godalming

== Gallery ==
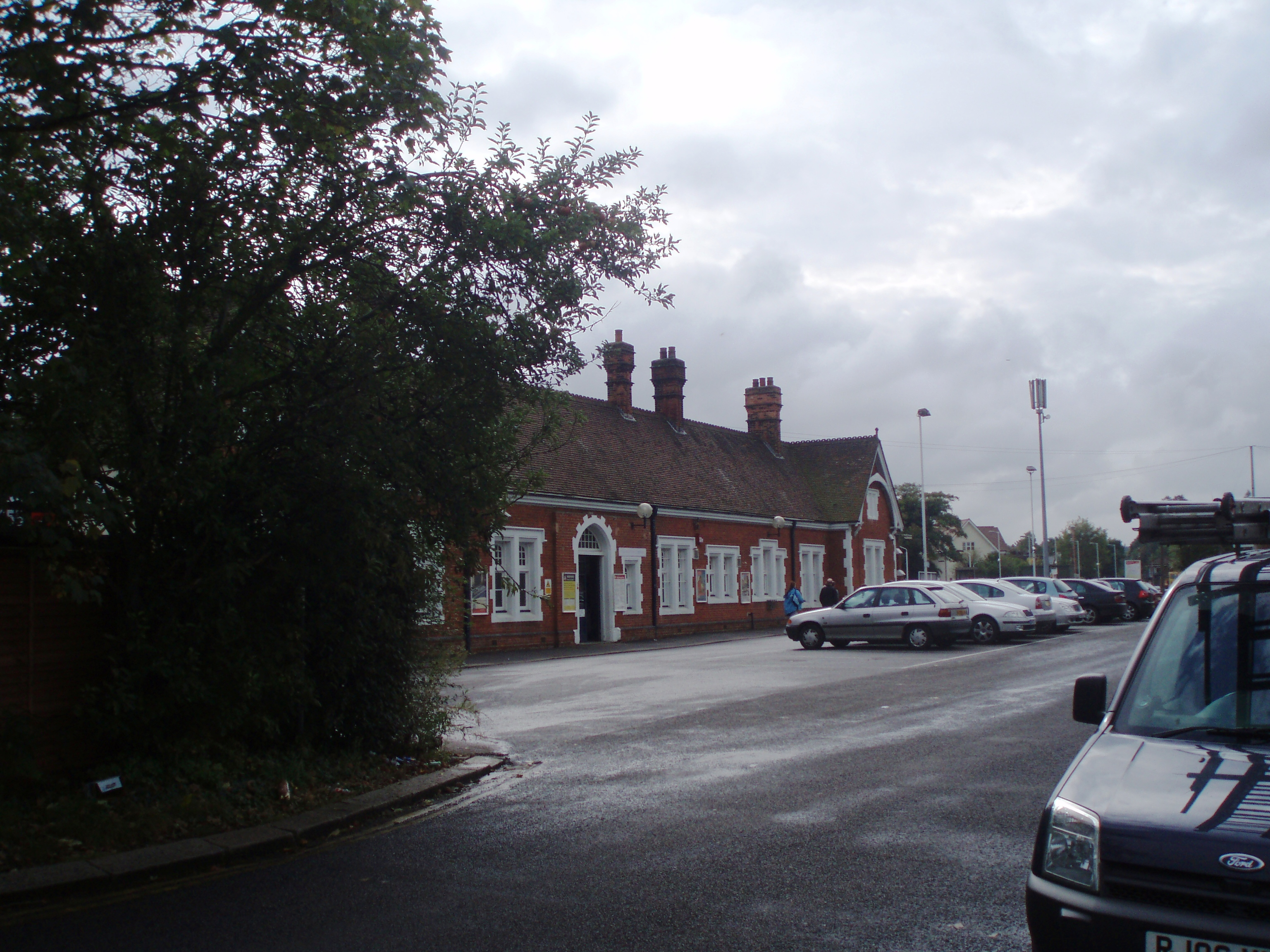
Station entrance

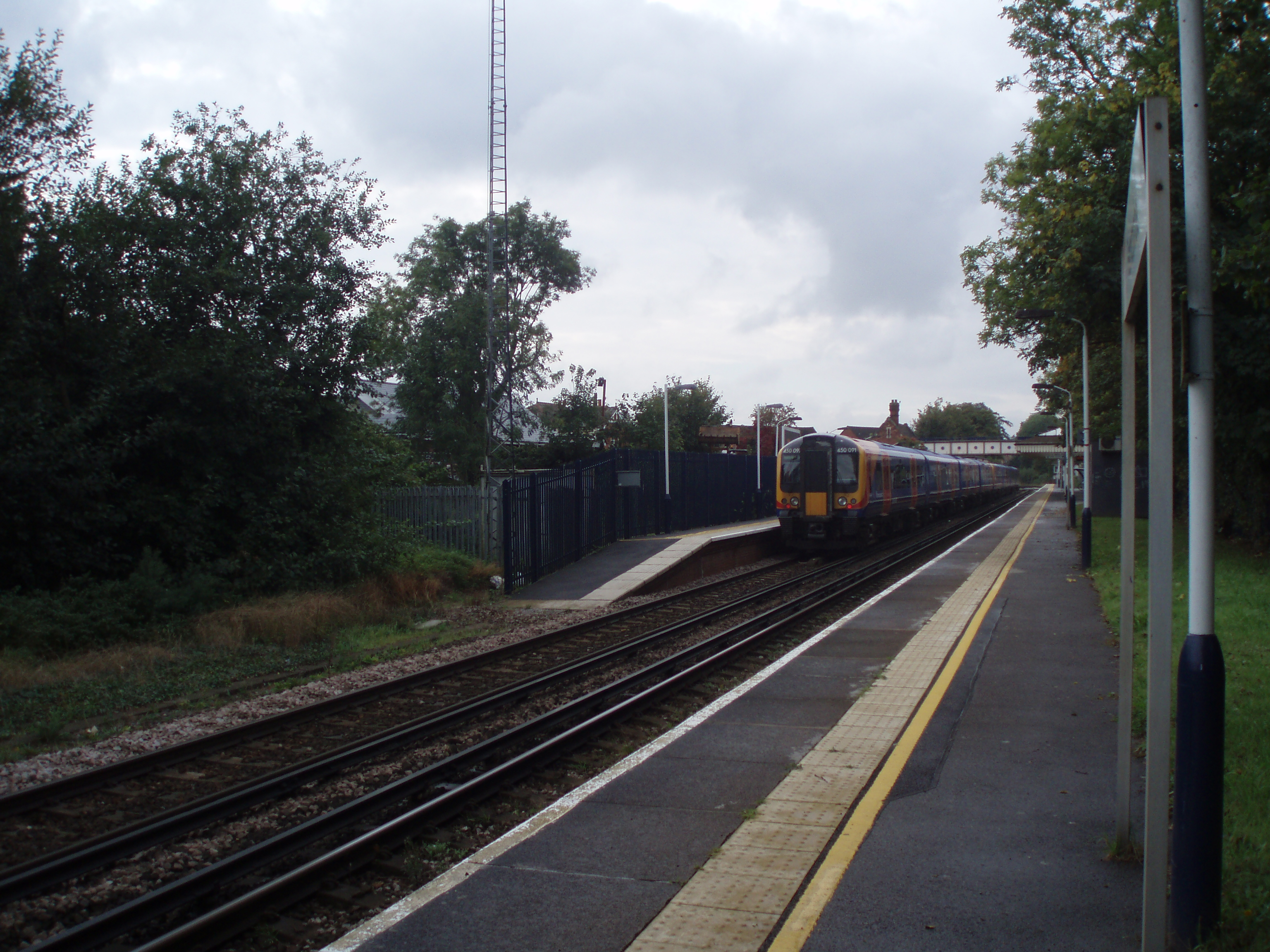
Asymmetrical platforms

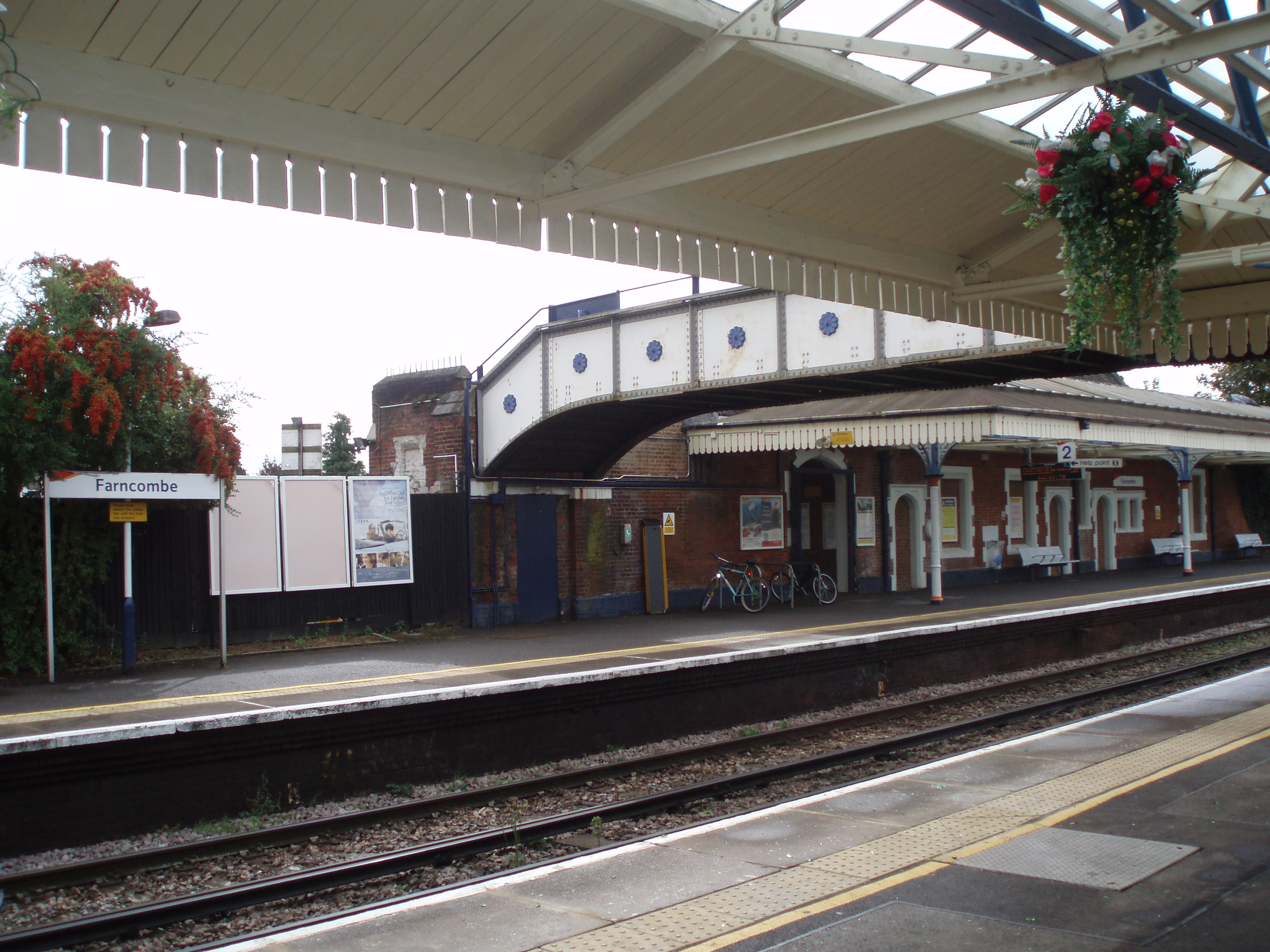
Looking across to the down platform

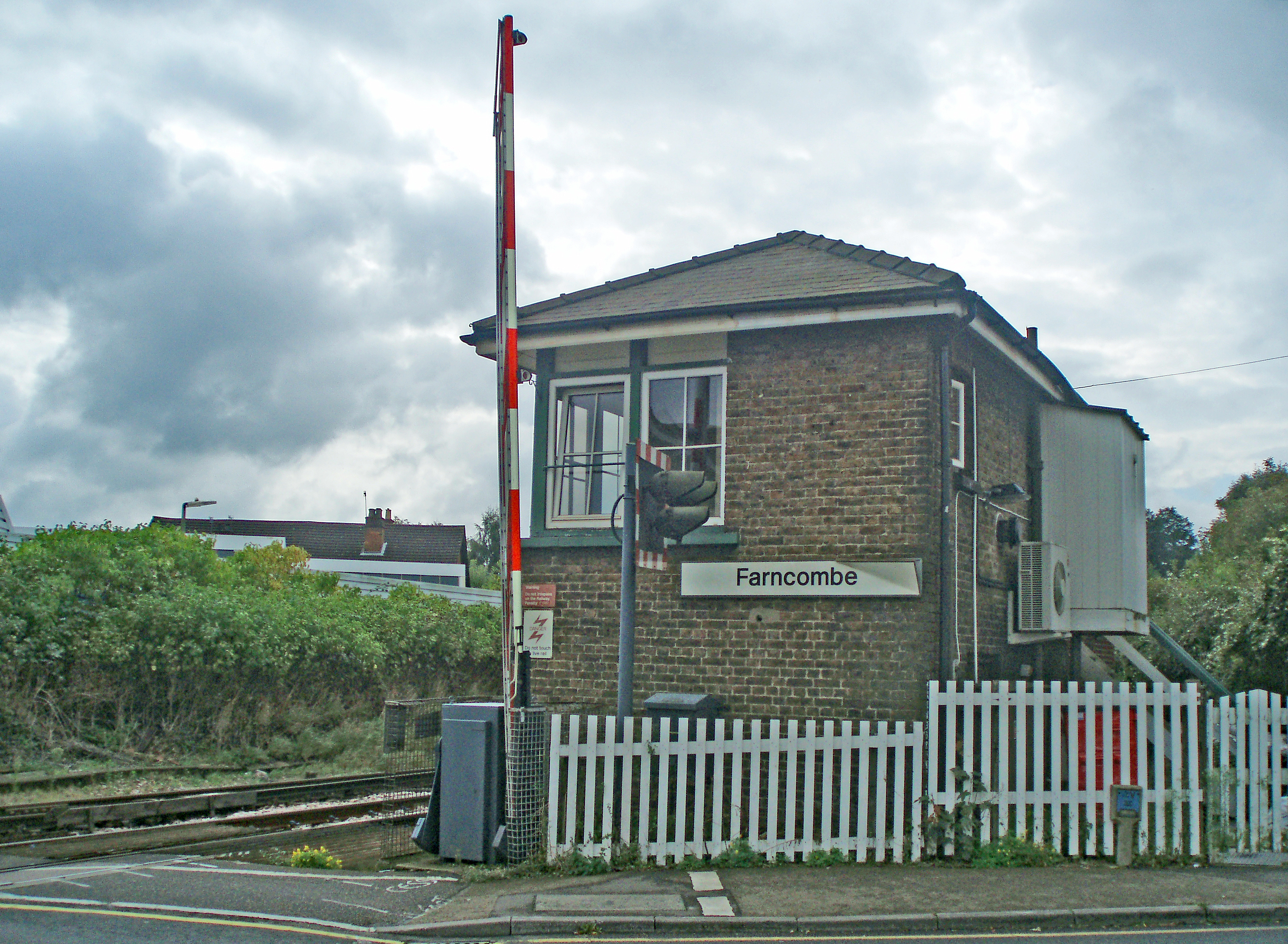
Signal box

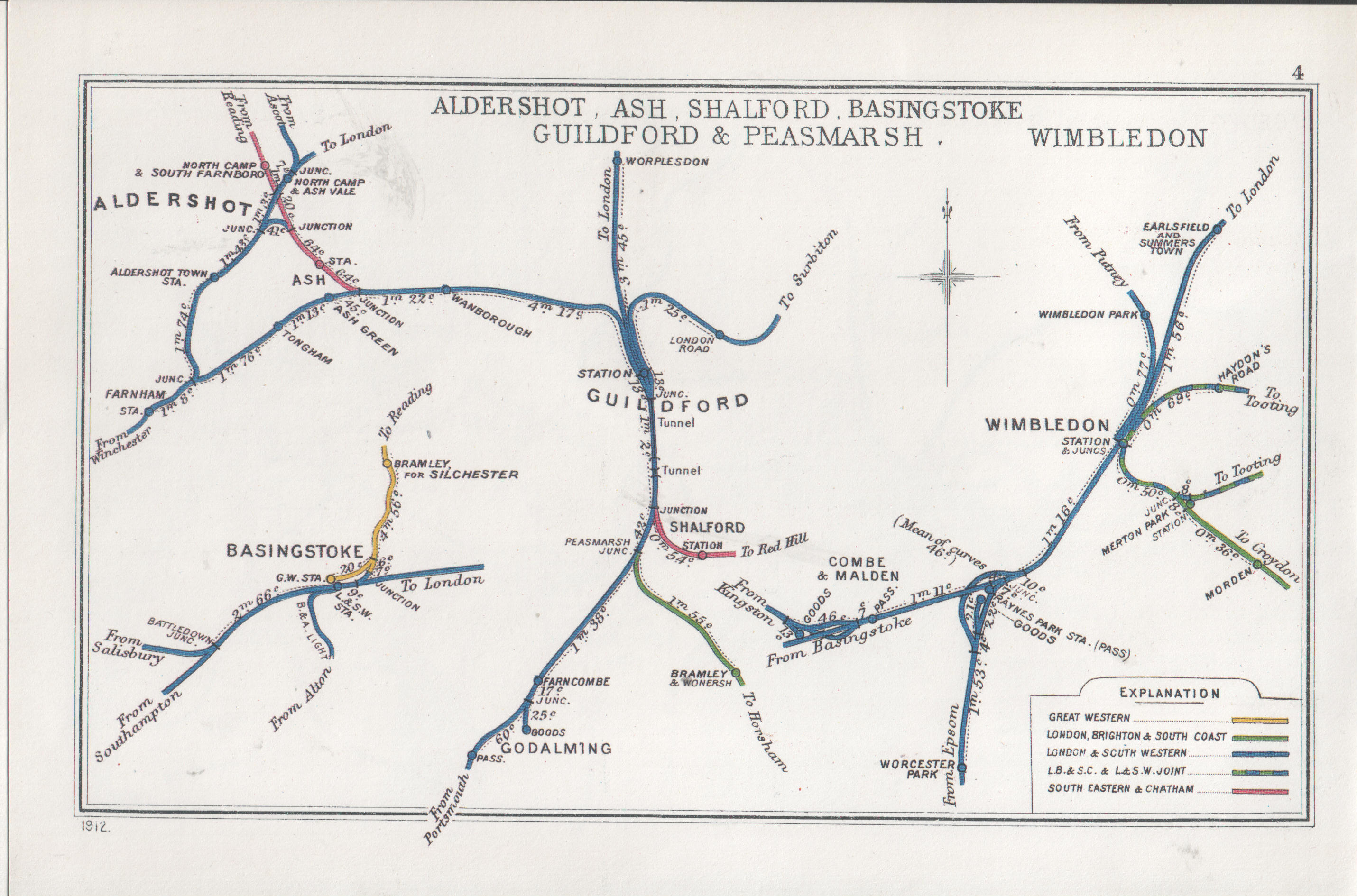
A 1912 Railway Clearing House map of lines around Farncombe railway station
