= Farncombe =

Village in Surrey, England

Coordinates: 51.196°N 0.605°W

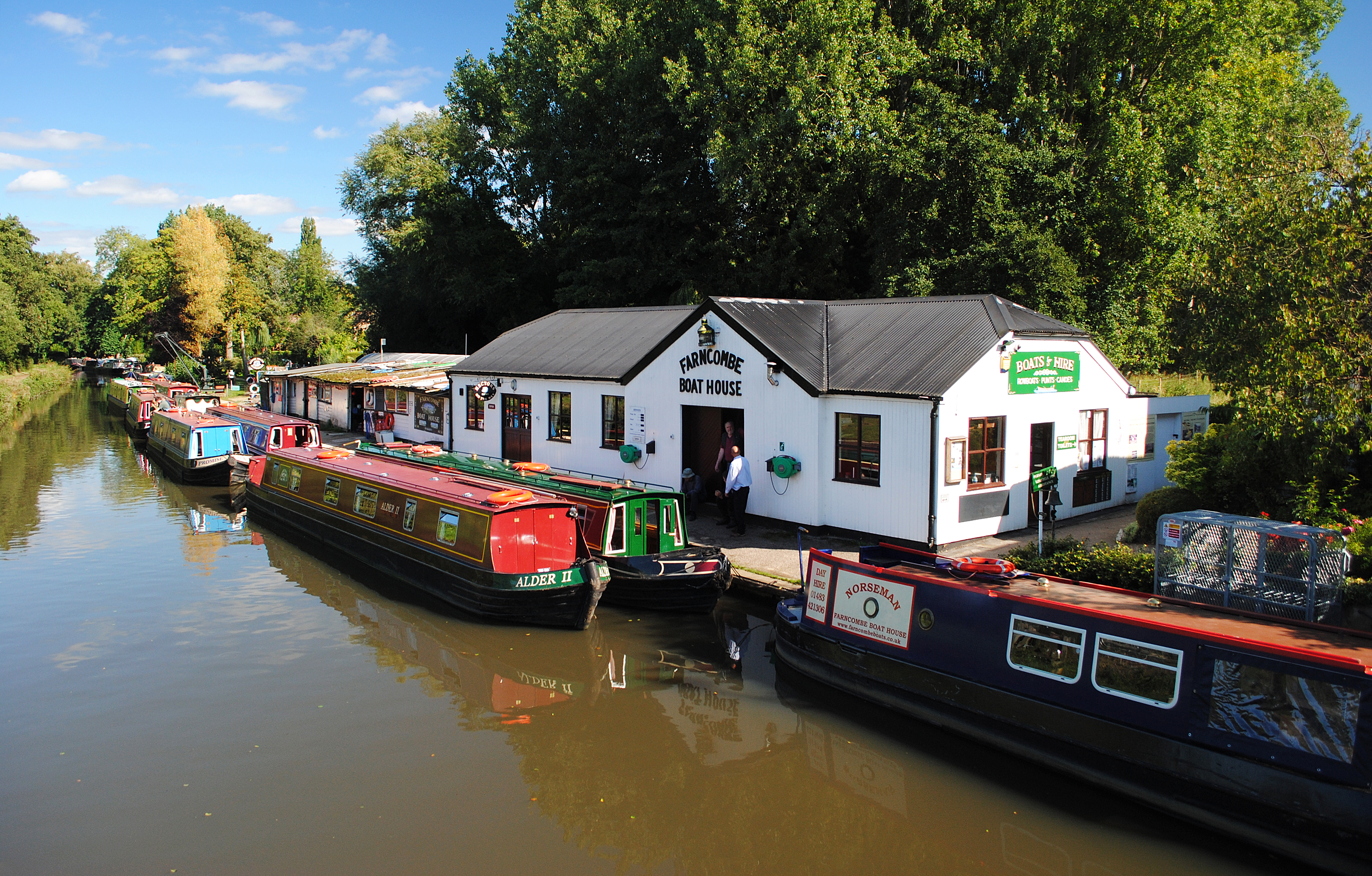
- Farncombe Boat House, 2013

- Location within Surrey
- OS grid reference: SU976449
  - London: 30 miles (48 km)
- Civil parish: Godalming
- District: Waverley
- Shire county: Surrey
- Region: South East
- Country: England
- Sovereign state: United Kingdom
- Post town: GODALMING
- Postcode district: GU7
- Dialling code: 01483
- Police: Surrey
- Fire: Surrey
- Ambulance: South East Coast
- UK Parliament: Godalming and Ash

Farncombe, historically Fernecome, is a village and peripheral settlement of Godalming in Waverley, Surrey, England and is approximately 0.8 miles (1.3 km) north-east of the Godalming centre, separated by common land known as the Lammas Lands. The village of Compton lies 1.8 miles (3 km) to the northwest and Bramley 2 miles (3 km) to the east; whilst Charterhouse School is to the west. Loseley Park, in the hamlet of Littleton, lies 1 mile (1.6 km) to the north of the village.

== History ==
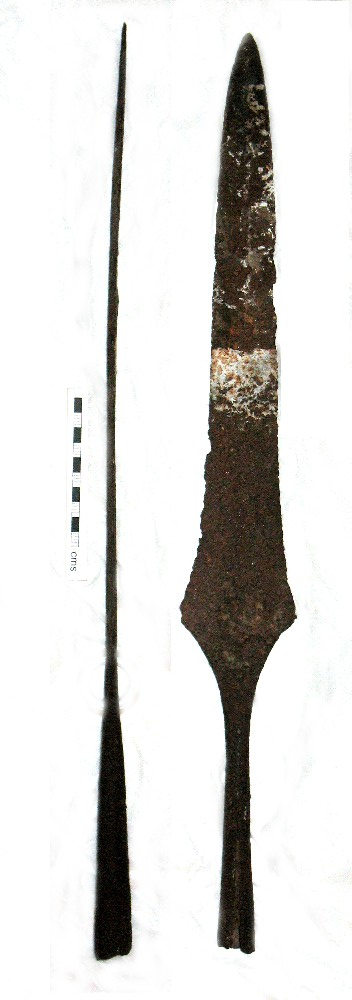
Early Anglo-Saxon spearhead from Farncombe

The earliest evidence of human activity is an early Anglo-Saxon spearhead, found in 1985. Farncombe appears in the Domesday Book as Fearnecombe, thought to mean "valley of the ferns". In 1086, it was held by the Bishop of Bayeux. Its Domesday assets were: 2 ploughs, 15 acres (61,000 m^{2}) of meadow, woodland worth 3 hogs. It rendered £1 4s 0d.

Among the oldest buildings in the village is a row of almshouses, built in 1622 for Richard Wyatt, the Master Carpenter of the Carpenters' Company in London. Farncombe Infants' School, on Grays Road, near the railway station was built by subscription in 1905 and was originally a boys' school. It was a mixed infants' school from 1935, and became a junior school in 1975 with an annexe for the infants school.

== Governance ==
Farncombe is part of one of the five wards that make up the town of Godalming. Farncombe is within the census area Godalming Farncombe and Catteshall (Ward), which had a population of 4,600 in 2011.

== Transport Links ==
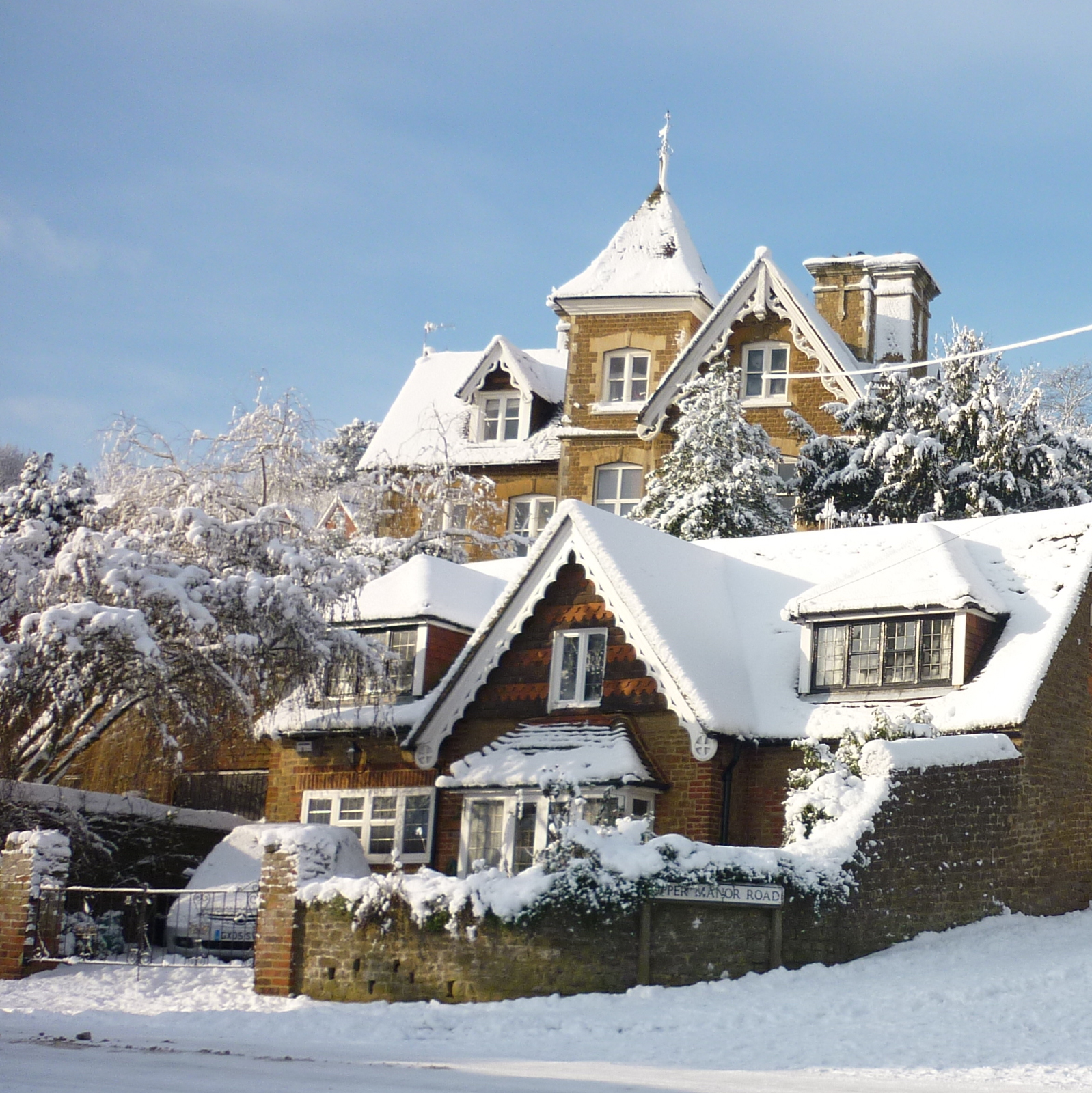
Houses in Nightingale Road, 2010

Farncombe is served by the Portsmouth-London railway, through Farncombe railway station, and the Hoppa community bus project. It is near the A3, which links the village with London and Portsmouth, and the M25. It lies on the River Wey and canal boats can be hired there taking travellers up to Guildford and beyond.

== Sports ==
Godalming and Farncombe Leisure Centre, home to Godalming Swimming Club, is in Farncombe. Farncombe Youth Football Club (FYFC) caters for boys and girls from ages 6/7 to 16/17. Farncombe Cricket Club and Godalming Tennis Club are both on Summers Road.

== Schools ==
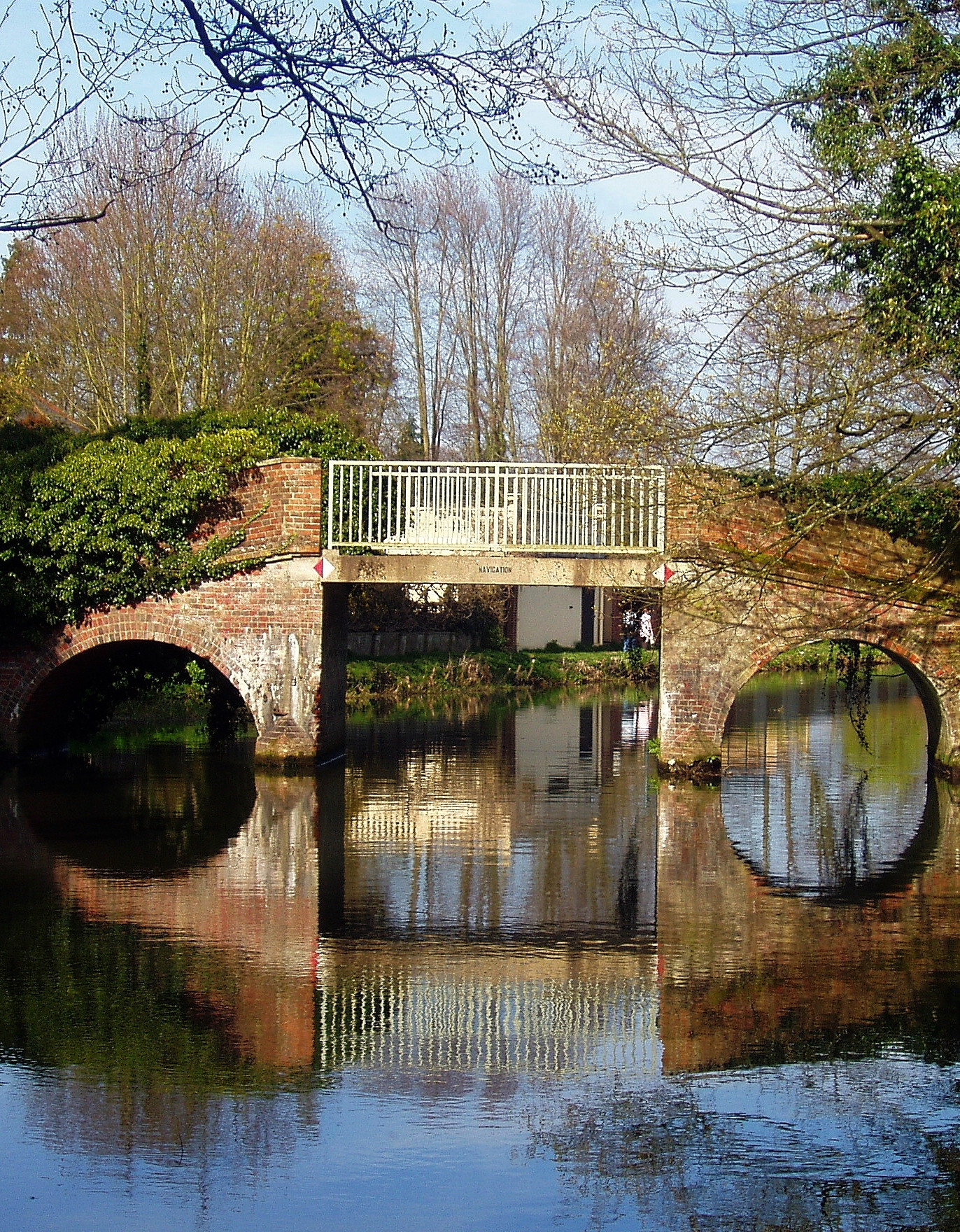
Trowers' Bridge, 2007

Farncombe is home to several schools, including:

- Broadwater School, a secondary school for children aged 11–16, on Summers Road.
- Farncombe Church of England Infants School, which teaches children age 4–7, on Grays Road.
- The Ladybird Nursery, which caters for children from 3 months to 5 years, on Fern Road.

== Pubs, Shops and Businesses ==
Farncombe is served by a number of traditional English pubs including: The White Hart, The Mead Row, The Ragged Robin, The Three Lions, The Charterhouse, and The Cricketers which has associations with Julius Caesar who played cricket in the area. It is also home to shops and businesses including a Co-op supermarket and two Indian restaurants: Farncombe Tandoori and The Rajasthan.

== Notable people ==
- Nellie Boxall (1890–1965) was born here and educated to be a domestic servant. She found notability working for Virginia Woolf.
- John George "Jack" Phillips (1887–1912) was born in Farncombe. He died while serving as senior Wireless operator on board the maiden voyage of the RMS Titanic. He continued working as the ship sank, trying to contact other ships that might be able come to the assistance of the Titanic. The Jack Phillips pub in Godalming High Street is named after him.
- Alan P. F. Sell (1935–2016), academic and theologian, was born in Farncombe.

== See also ==
- List of places of worship in Waverley (borough)
