= Godalming railway station =

Railway station in Surrey, England

Godalming
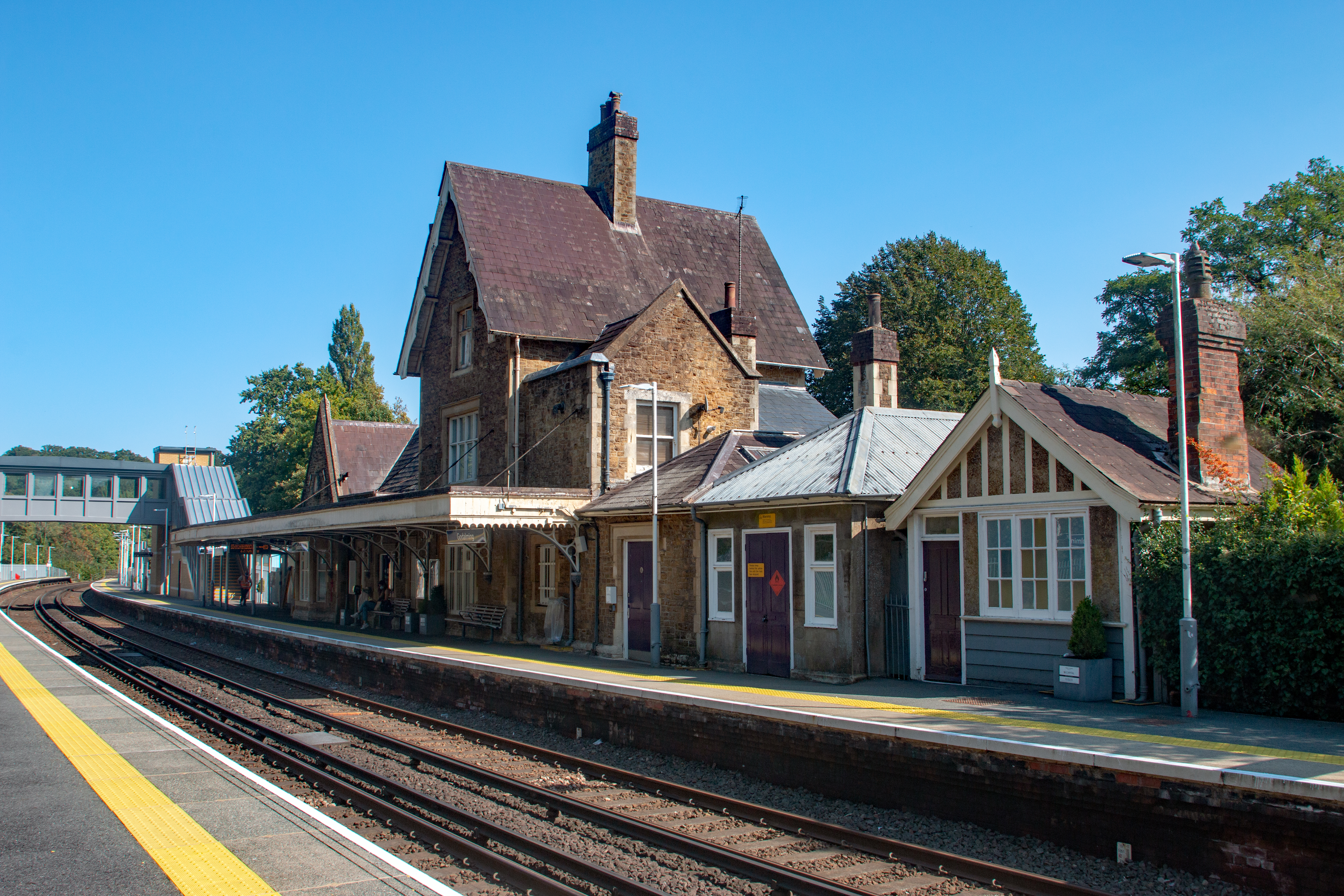

General information
- Location: Godalming, Waverley; England
- Coordinates: 51°11′13″N 0°37′08″W
- Grid reference: SU966439
- Managed by: South Western Railway
- Platforms: 2

Other information
- Station code: GOD
- Classification: DfT category C2

History
- Opened: 1 January 1859

Passengers
- 2020/21: ▼0.292 million
- 2021/22: ▲0.953 million
- 2022/23: ▲1.217 million
- 2023/24: ▲1.403 million
- 2024/25: ▲1.688 million
Location
Notes
- Passenger statistics from the Office of Rail and Road

Godalming railway station is a stop on the Portsmouth Direct Line, 34 miles 37 chains (55.5 km) down the line from London Waterloo. The station, opened in 1859 to replace one on a different site, is situated at the edge of the town of Godalming, Surrey. The main station building is a Grade II listed building.

== History ==
The original Godalming station was a single-platform terminus, opened in 1849. It was located on a spur from just south of the current site Farncombe station, north of the River Wey. When the Portsmouth Direct line was completed in 1859, the current station was built. The original Goldalming station became known as Godalming Old. The old station remained in use until Farncombe opened in 1897, after which it was closed to passengers but remained open as a goods yard until 1969. The building was in a similar style to Micheldever railway station. The site at grid reference SU973443 is now a residential development on Old Station Way.

The new station is in a similar style to Petersfield railway station, further south on the same line. The main building has a three-storey section with a steep-sided roof forming a gable end, connected to a recessed entrance hall and a single-storey gabled section with a large bay window. The gables have scalloped bargeboards. The whole building is faced in local Bargate stone, giving it a golden brown colour, with Tudor-style dressings and motifs in ashlar. A short canopy covers the recess outside the entrance hall and a more substantial one runs the length of the platform.

== Station environment and awards ==
In 2004 the station won Best Miscellaneous Building in the Godalming in Bloom 2004 Competition, in 2005 and 2006, the Best Small Station in the South West Trains Station Pride Awards and received a Highly Commended in the National Rail Awards. In July 2006, the station won the Special Award in the Godalming in Bloom 2006 competition, not only for the display of flowers, but also for the welcoming environment. It won again in 2008.

== In popular culture ==
In February 2006 Godalming station was renamed "Shere" for three days while filming took place for The Holiday, a film starring Cameron Diaz, Jude Law, Jack Black and Kate Winslet. It was directed by Nancy Meyers and released in December 2006.

== 2016 accessibility project ==
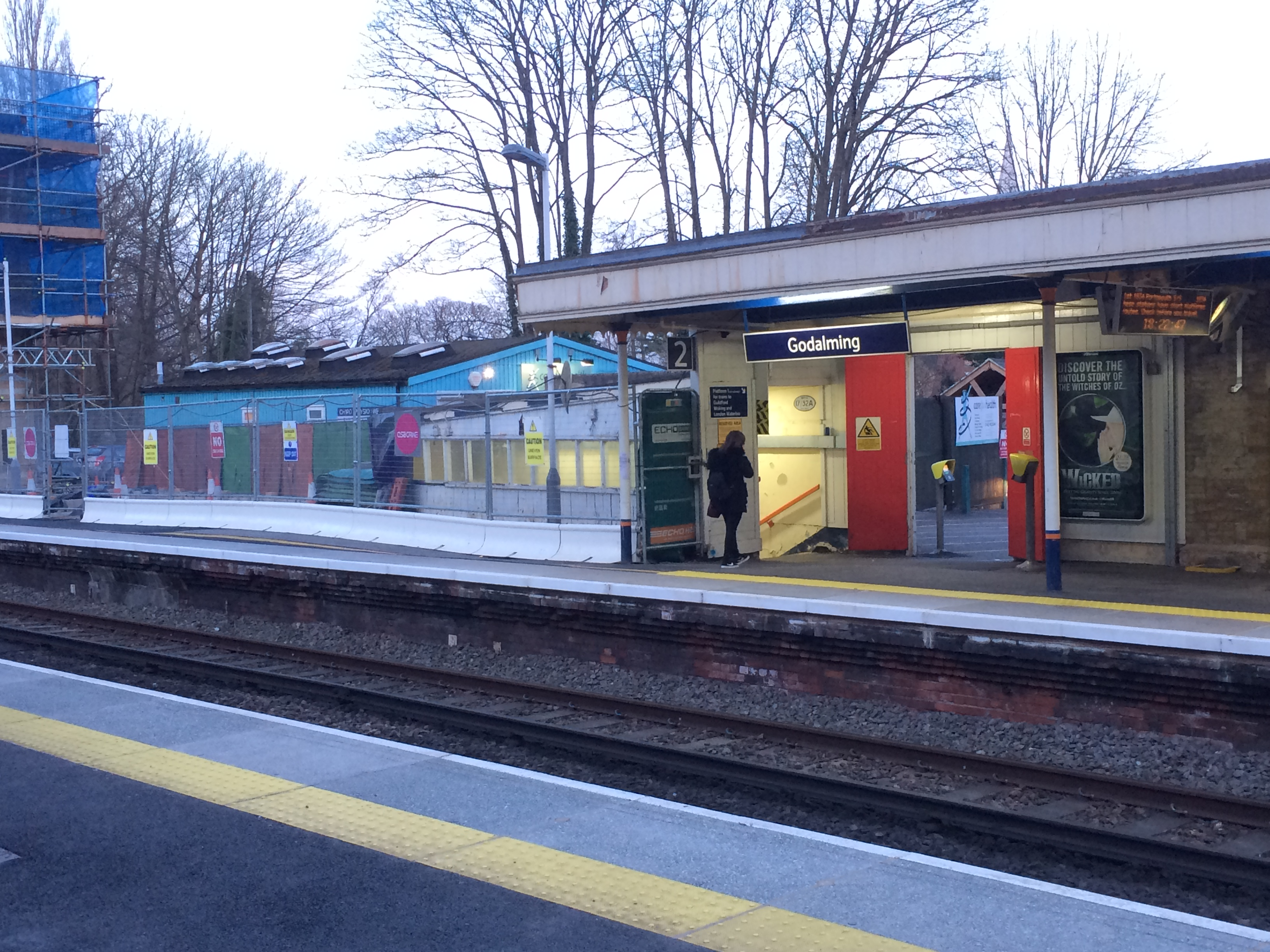
The down (southbound) platform during upgrade works, with the subway entrance visible

The pedestrian subway connecting the platforms is a narrow passageway with limited accessibility, typical of the era of the construction of the station. It provided a challenging route for the disabled, as well as prams and passengers encumbered with luggage, potentially requiring a lengthy detour outside the station to access the London-bound platform. As one of relatively few subways of the era still in use, it suffered from dampness and poor sight lines, and had become relatively dilapidated.

In 2016 Godalming station was therefore allocated £3.1m of funding under the government 'Access for All' funding programme to replace the subway with a fully enclosed footbridge, equipped with two 16-person lifts to enable step free access between platforms. Other works funded under the programme include replacement and extension of the cycle shelters, platform canopy extensions to provide a weather protected route between the new footbridge structure and existing canopies, and resurfacing of the platforms to provide tactile paving and improve the stepping distance between platform and train.

== Services ==
All services at Godalming are operated by South Western Railway using Class 444 and 450 EMUs.

The typical off-peak service in trains per hour is:

- 3 tph to London Waterloo via Guildford
- 1 tph to Haslemere (all stations)
- 2 tph to Portsmouth & Southsea (1 semi-fast, 1 all stations except Milford and Witley)

The station is also served by one morning and one evening service to Southampton Central.

Preceding station	National Rail	Following station
Farncombe or Guildford	South Western Railway Portsmouth Direct Line	Milford or Haslemere

== Gallery ==
The new ticket vending machine installed at Godalming railway station during 2006

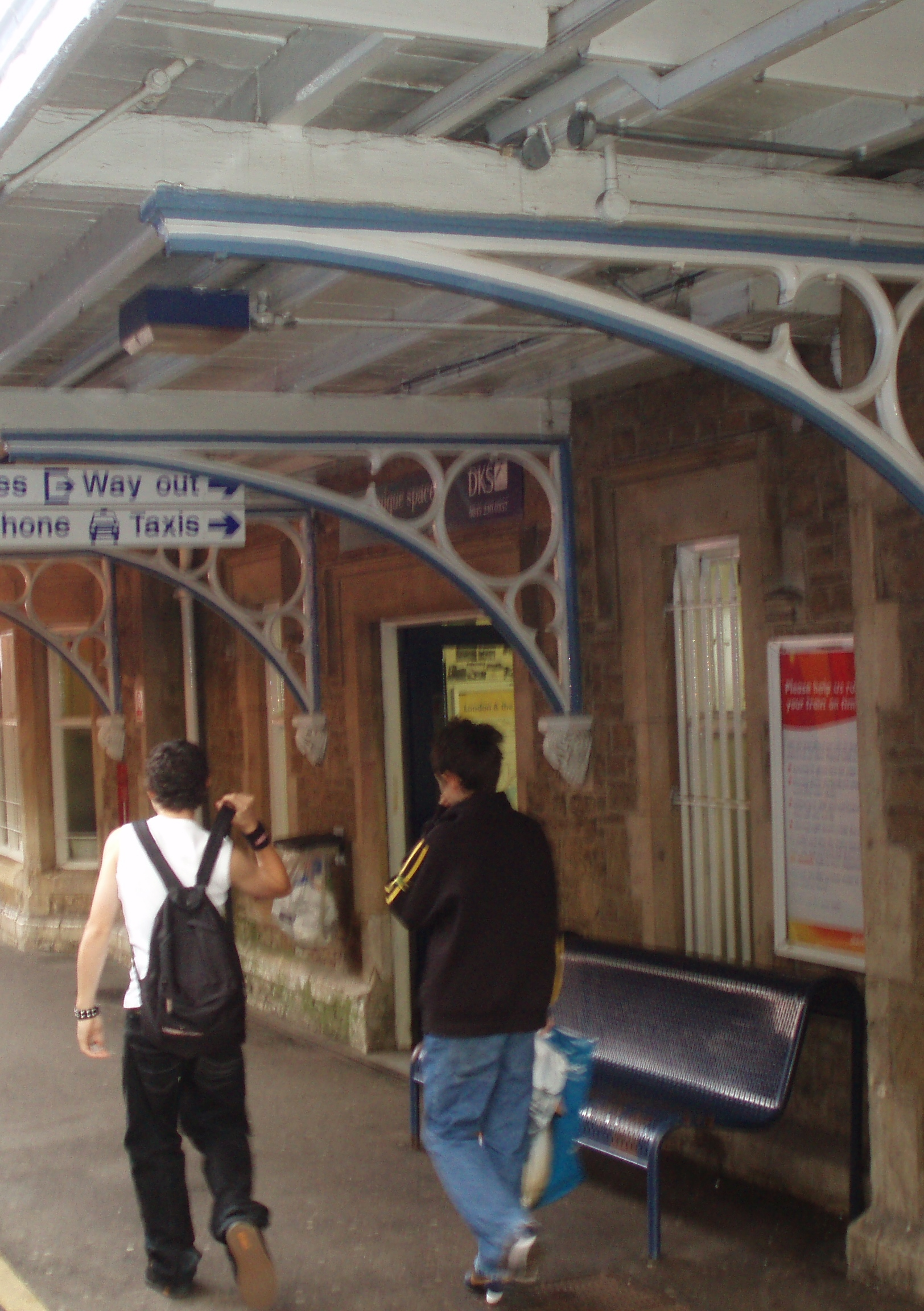
Passengers depart a south bound train towards the main entrance.

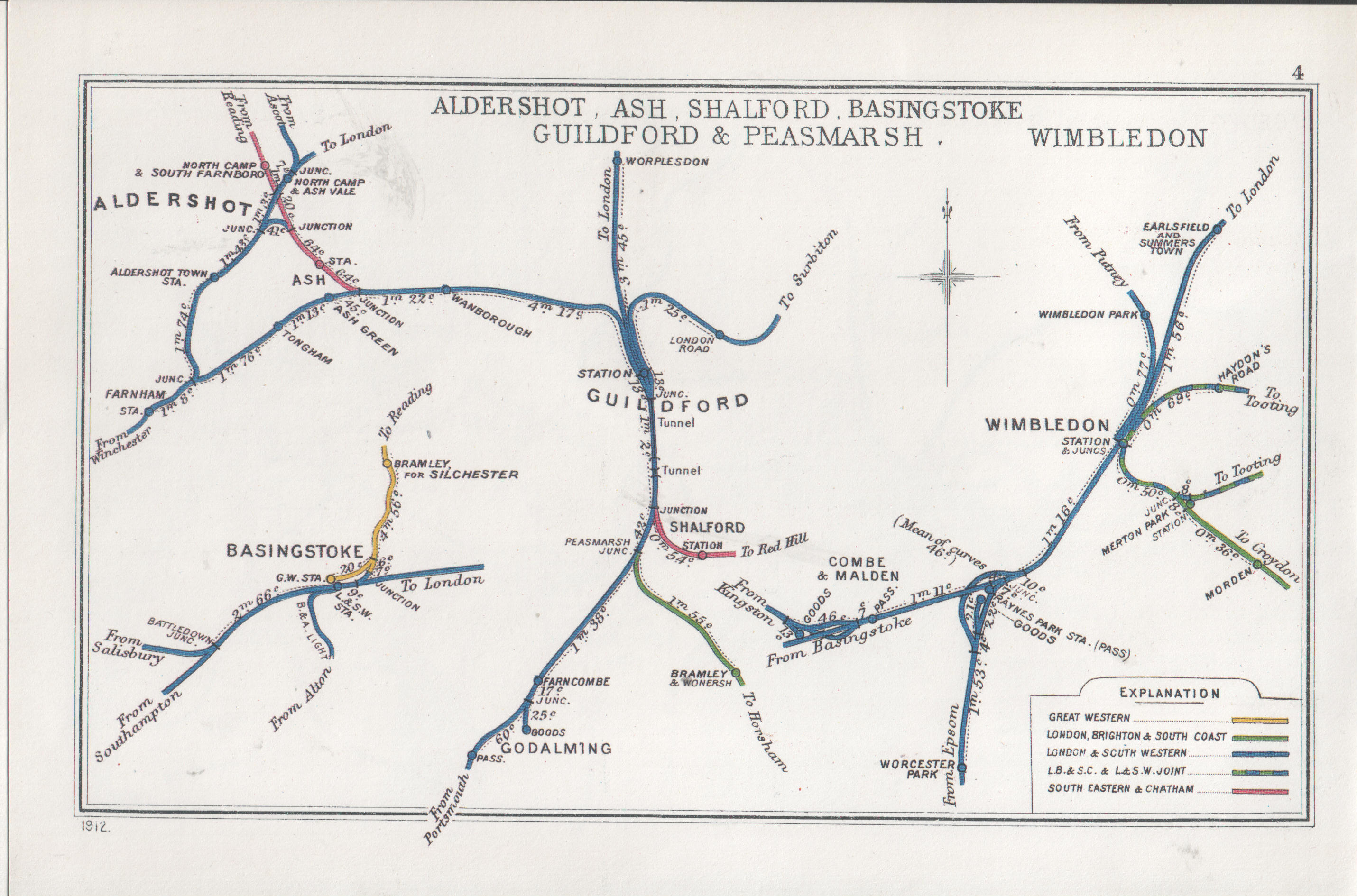
A 1912 Railway Clearing House map of lines around Godalming railway station

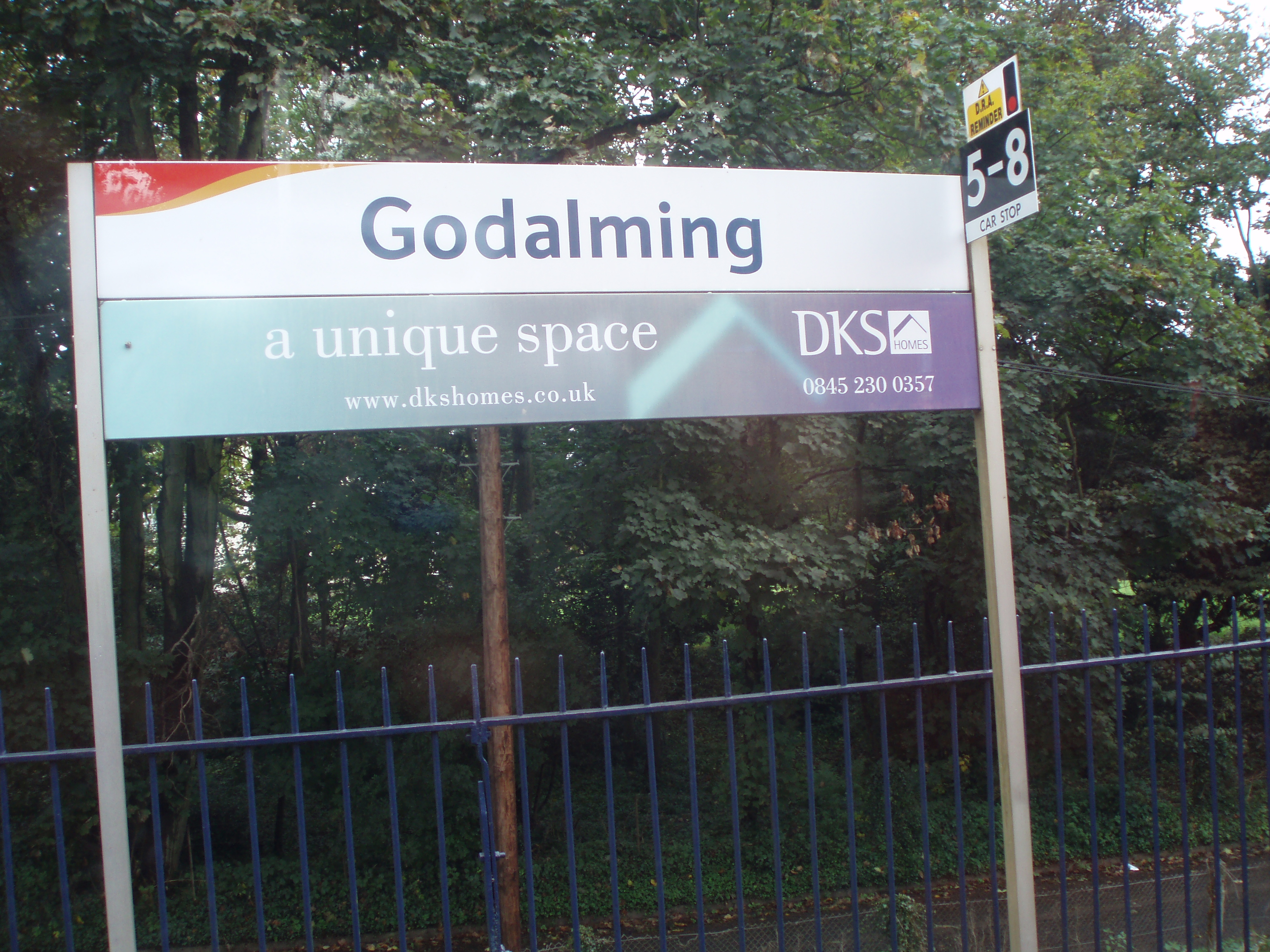
Sign on the up platform

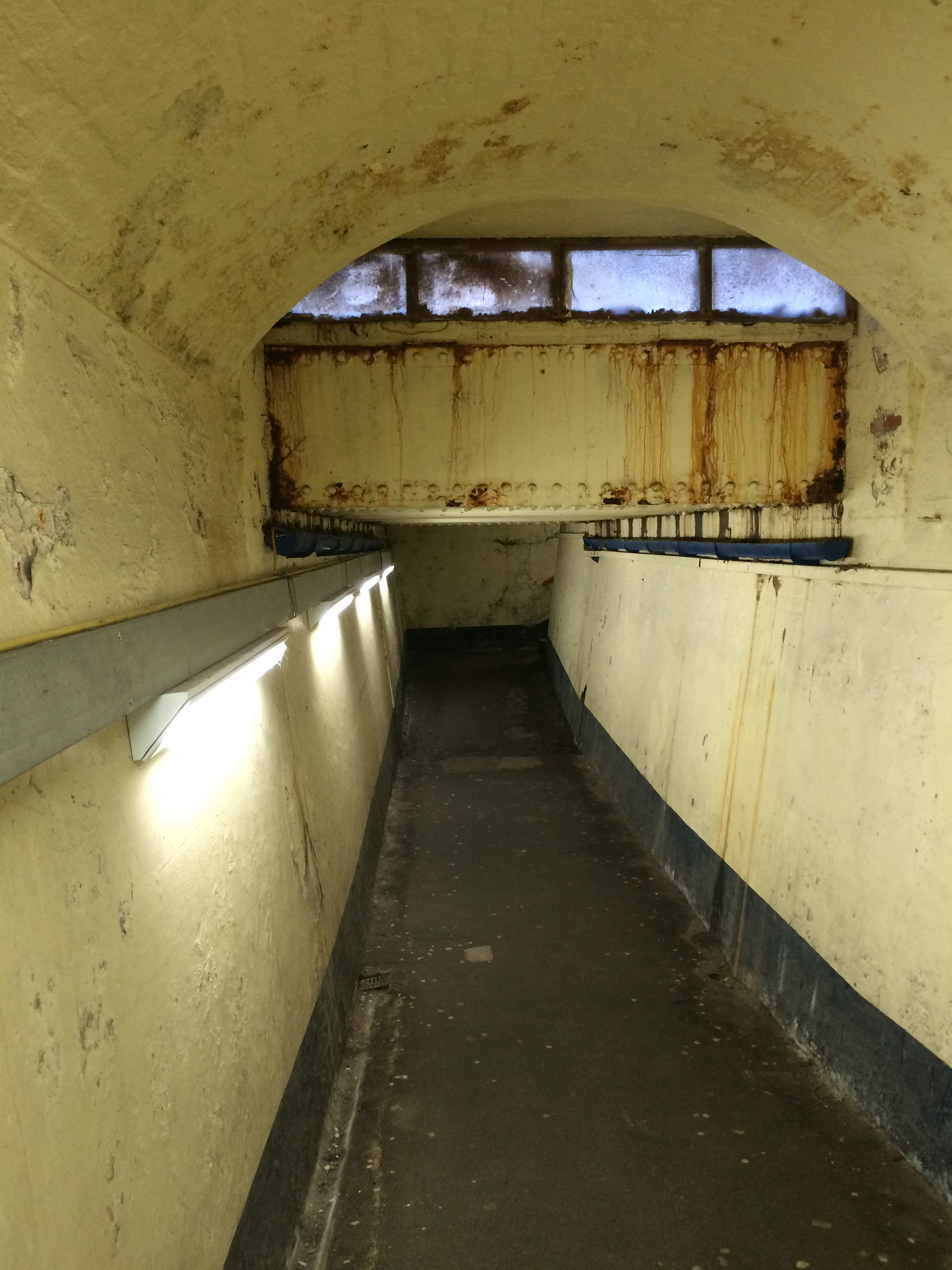
The interior of the former cross-platform subway, before replacement by a footbridge
