= Wormley, Surrey =

Village and parish in Surrey, England

Coordinates: 51°08′10″N 0°38′47″W

Wormley
- Village
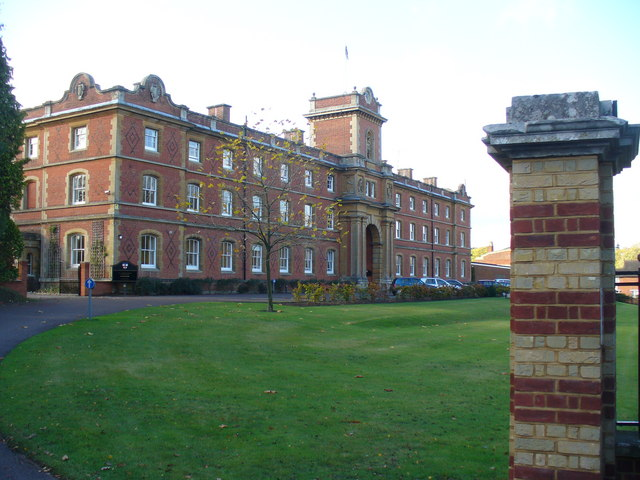
- King Edward's School

- Location within Surrey
- OS grid reference: SU947383
- Civil parish: Witley and Milford
- District: Waverley
- Shire county: Surrey
- Region: South East
- Country: England
- Sovereign state: United Kingdom
- Post town: Haslemere
- Postcode district: GU8
- Dialling code: 01428
- Police: Surrey
- Fire: Surrey
- Ambulance: South East Coast
- UK Parliament: Godalming and Ash

Wormley is a village in the civil parish of Witley and Milford, in the Waverley district, in Surrey, England, around Witley station, off the A283 Petworth Road about 5 km (3.1 mi) SSW of Godalming.

== History ==
=== Expansion from archetypal hamlet ===
Wormley developed primarily as a result of the construction in the 19th century of Witley station, on the Portsmouth Direct line. King Edward's School, Witley once had its own station platform.

=== Former businesses ===
Cooper & Sons Ltd owned the Combelane walking stick factory; this was replaced by houses with small gardens and a light industrial estate. The Institute of Oceanographic Sciences Deacon Laboratory was here from 1952 to 1995, housed in the former Admiralty Signals Establishment building on Brook Road. The only public house, the Wood Pigeon, closed in 2007.

== Architecture and gardens ==
King Edward's School is a Grade II listed building, the school war memorial is also Grade II listed. Gertrude Jekyll designed the gardens at Tigbourne Court and Wood End, houses both designed by Edward Lutyens.

== Notable former residents ==
- Louis de Bernières (b. 1954) based his collection of short stories, Notwithstanding, on the local area. In the afterword of the book, he muses whether Wormley is no longer a rural idyll.
- George Eliot (1819–1880) was a resident.
- Gertrude Mary Tuckwell (1861–1951) lived the last twenty years of her life in Little Woodlands, Combe Lane.
