= Milford railway station =

Railway station serving the village of Milford, Surrey, England

Coordinates: 51.163°N 0.637°W

Milford (Surrey)
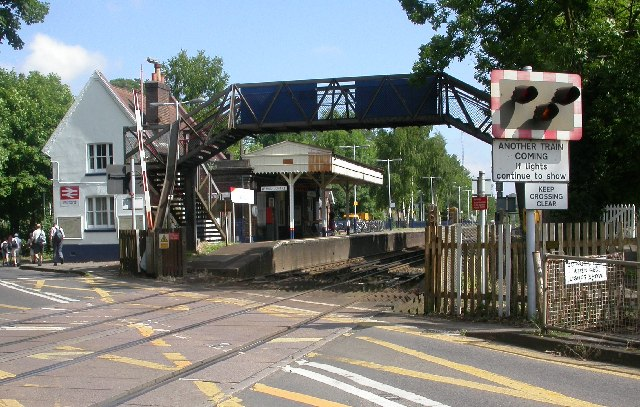
- Milford Station

General information
- Location: Milford, Surrey, Waverley; England
- Grid reference: SU954413
- Managed by: South Western Railway
- Platforms: 2

Other information
- Station code: MLF
- Classification: DfT category E

History
- Opened: 1 January 1859

Passengers
- 2020/21: ▼57,974
- 2021/22: ▲0.142 million
- 2022/23: ▲0.173 million
- 2023/24: ▲0.178 million
- 2024/25: ▲0.194 million
Location
Notes
- Passenger statistics from the Office of Rail and Road

Milford railway station is a railway station serving the village of Milford in the English county of Surrey. It is a stop on the Portsmouth Direct Line, 36 miles 21 chains (58.4 km) from London Waterloo.

The station has two side platforms flanking a pair of tracks, with step free access to both platforms. The platforms are linked by a publicly accessible footbridge and an adjoining level crossing controlled by safety barriers. There is a ticket office, staffed during weekday mornings only, on the northbound platform, and ticket machines are available at all times the station is open. The station car park has 136 spaces.

The station has the same name as the fictional station in the film Brief Encounter (1945) starring Trevor Howard and Celia Johnson, although the scenes were filmed at Carnforth station in Lancashire.

== Services ==
All services at Milford are operated by South Western Railway using Class 444 and 450 EMUs, excluding the singular evening service, terminating at Haslemere, operated by a Class 458 — 2P71.

The typical off-peak service in trains per hour is:

- 1 tph to London Waterloo via Guildford
- 1 tph to Haslemere

The station is also served by a single evening service to Southampton Central.

On Sundays, the service to Haslemere extends to Portsmouth Harbour.

Preceding station	National Rail	Following station
Godalming	South Western Railway Portsmouth Direct Line	Witley
