= Witley railway station =

Railway station in Surrey, England

Coordinates: 51°07′59″N 0°38′46″W

Witley
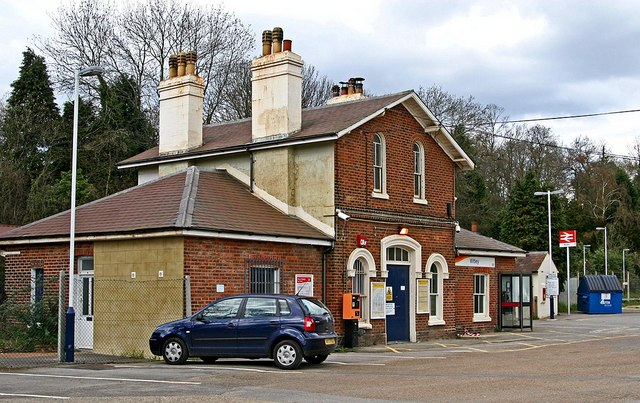

General information
- Location: Wormley, Waverley; England
- Grid reference: SU948379
- Manager: South Western Railway
- Platforms: 2

Other information
- Station code: WTY
- Classification: DfT category E

Key dates
- 1 January 1859: Opened (Witley and Chiddingfold)
- 6 October 1947: Renamed (Witley)

Passengers
- 2020/21: ▼56,576
- 2021/22: ▲0.146 million
- 2022/23: ▲0.173 million
- 2023/24: ▲0.188 million
- 2024/25: ▲0.211 million
Location
Notes
- Passenger statistics from the Office of Rail and Road

Witley railway station is a station on the Portsmouth Direct Line in Surrey, England. It is 38 miles 36 chains (61.9 km) down the line from London Waterloo via Woking.

== Location ==
Witley is, like Milford to the north-east, a minor stop on the Portsmouth Direct Line 38½ miles (62 km) south-west of London Waterloo. When opened, it was named Witley and Chiddingfold.

Its nearest communities without major stations are Wormley, the southern part of Witley (the north of which is served by Milford railway station), Hambledon and Chiddingfold.

== Services ==
All services at Witley are operated by South Western Railway using Class 444 and 450 EMUs.

The typical off-peak service in trains per hour is:

- 1 tph to London Waterloo via Guildford
- 1 tph to Haslemere

The station is also served by a single evening service to Southampton Central.

On Sundays, the service to Haslemere extends to Portsmouth Harbour.

Preceding station	National Rail	Following station
Milford	South Western Railway Portsmouth Direct Line	Haslemere
