= Haslemere railway station =

Railway station in Surrey, England

Haslemere
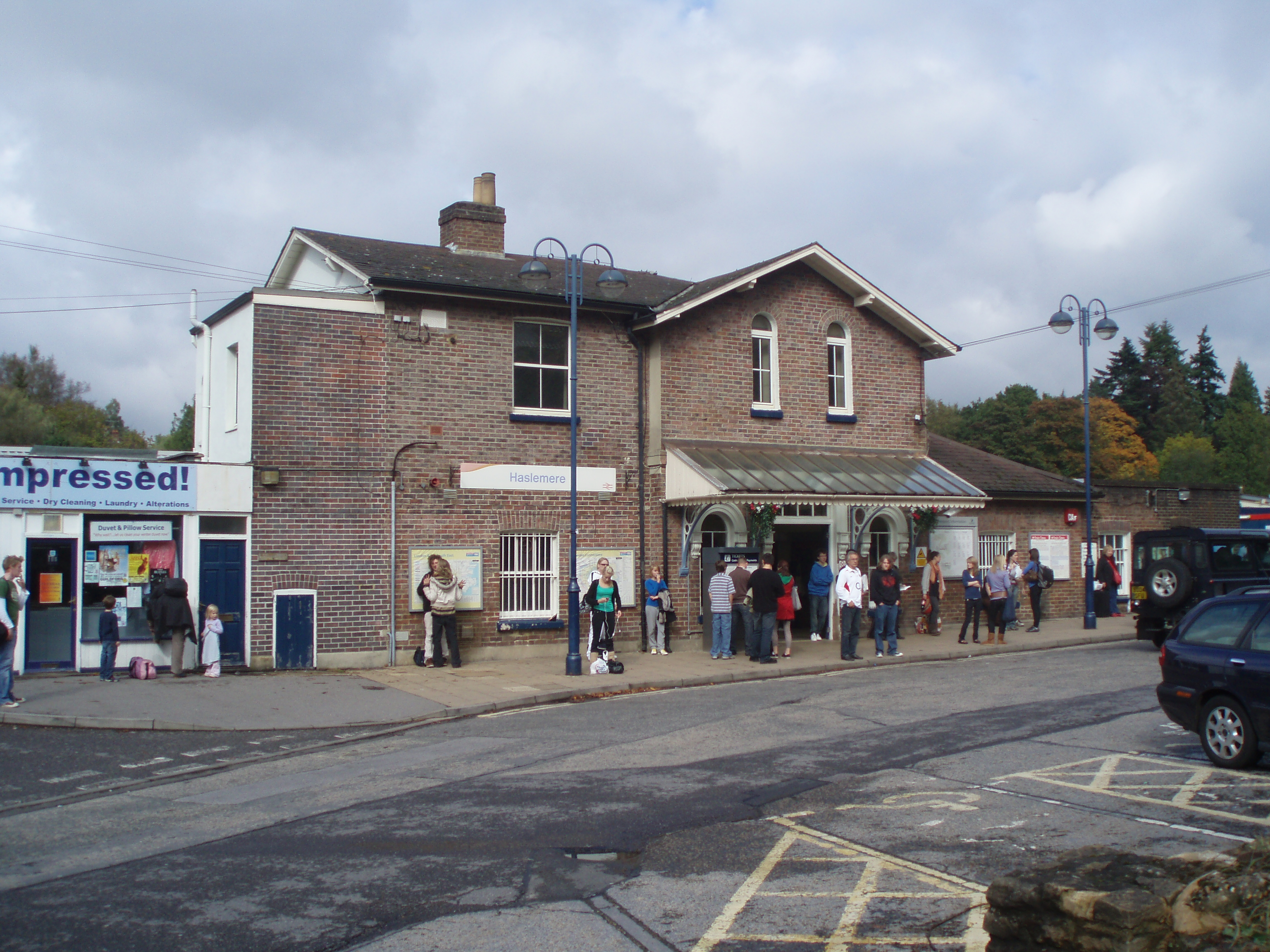

General information
- Location: Haslemere, Waverley; England
- Coordinates: 51°05′20″N 0°43′08″W
- Grid reference: SU897329
- Managed by: South Western Railway
- Platforms: 3

Other information
- Station code: HSL
- Classification: DfT category C2

History
- Opened: 1 January 1859

Passengers
- 2020/21: ▼0.356 million
- Interchange: ▼18,246
- 2021/22: ▲0.950 million
- Interchange: ▲52,154
- 2022/23: ▲1.212 million
- Interchange: ▲56,812
- 2023/24: ▲1.298 million
- Interchange: ▲63,305
- 2024/25: ▲1.458 million
- Interchange: ▼62,499
Location
Notes
- Passenger statistics from the Office of Rail and Road

Haslemere railway station is on the Portsmouth Direct Line, serving the town of Haslemere, Surrey, England. It is 42 miles 79 chains (69.2 km) down the line from London Waterloo, measured via Woking.

== History ==
The large car park (to the south) and industrial estate (to the north) were originally large goods sidings. Platform 3 is an addition to the original structure, built in 1938 when the line was electrified. Until then, Haslemere was just a standard wayside station, but it became steadily busier as commuter traffic from the surrounding countryside grew. There are now four trains an hour to Waterloo and three to Portsmouth.

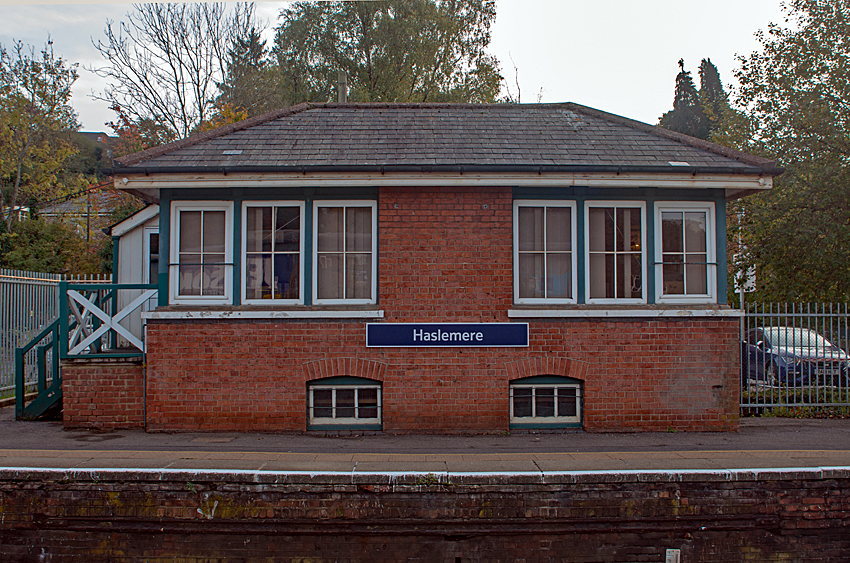
Haslemere signal box

The station signal box, on the down platform, is a Grade II listed building. It is an LSWR type 4 design and has an original 1895 47-lever Stevens lever frame. It was formally decommissioned on 25 October 2025, as part of a programme of improvements that transferred its functions to Basingstoke Rail Operating Centre. The box is now open to the public as a museum operated by the Haslemere Signal Box Trust.

Since June 2008, a new footbridge with lifts provides disabled access to platforms 2 and 3.

In December 2016, the station received a new decked car park, which added significant parking space at the station.

== Services ==
=== Platforms ===
It is the only station on the Portsmouth Direct Line between Guildford and Fratton to have more than two platforms. Platform 3 is used to allow northbound fast services to overtake stopping services. Platform 2, generally used by up stopping services, is also used by trains terminating here.

=== Services ===
All services at Haslemere are operated by South Western Railway using Class 444 and 450 EMUs, excluding the singular evening service, which terminates here, and is operated by a Class 458 — 2P71.

The typical off-peak service in trains per hour was in 2024:

- 3 tph to London Waterloo via Guildford (1 semi-fast, 2 stopping)
- 2 tph to Portsmouth Harbour (1 semi-fast, 1 all stations)

The station is also served by few morning and evening services to and from Southampton Central and Fareham.

Preceding station	National Rail	Following station
Witley or Godalming	South Western Railway: Portsmouth Direct Line; Stopping Services	Liphook or Terminus
Godalming	South Western Railway: Portsmouth Direct Line; Fast Services	Petersfield
