= Portsmouth Direct line =

Railway line from London to Portsmouth, England

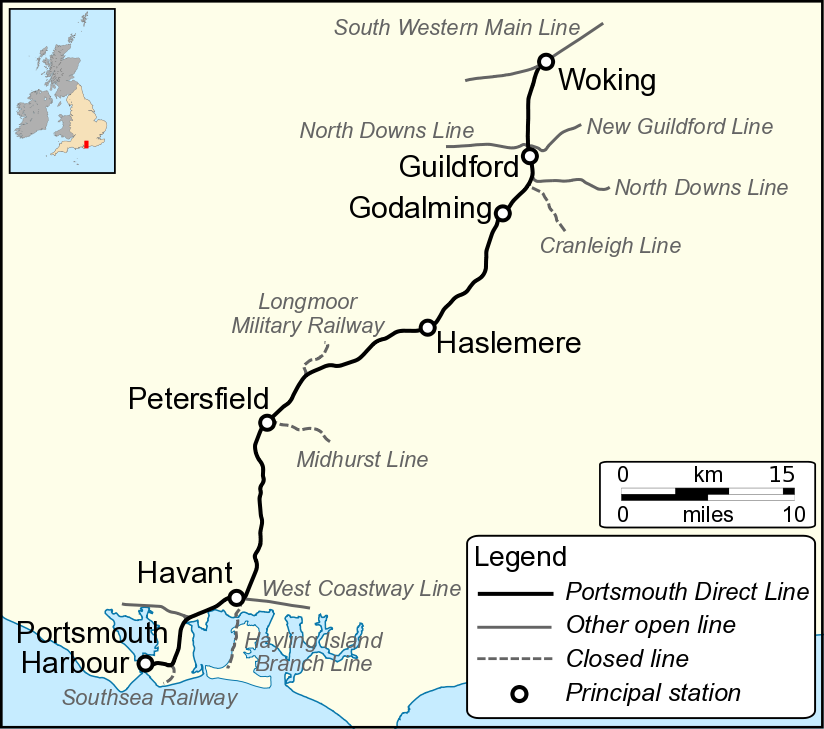
- Portsmouth Direct line

Overview
- Status: Operational
- Owner: Network Rail
- Locale: Hampshire; West Sussex; Surrey; South East England

Service
- Type: Suburban rail, Heavy rail
- System: National Rail
- Operator: South Western Railway
- Rolling stock: Class 444; Class 450

History
- Opened: 1858

Technical
- Track gauge: 1,435 mm (4 ft 8 1/2 in) standard gauge
- Operating speed: 90 mph (145 km/h) max.

The Portsmouth Direct line is a railway route between Woking in Surrey and Portsmouth Harbour in Hampshire, England. It forms the principal route for passenger trains between London, Guildford and Portsmouth; connections are made to the ferry services which operate between Portsmouth and the Isle of Wight. The final section of line from Havant to Portsmouth is shared with other passenger routes.

The line was opened in stages, in part by the Portsmouth Railway, independently of the established railway companies, the London and South Western Railway (LSWR) and the London, Brighton and South Coast Railway (LBCSR), both of which had rather circuitous routes to Portsmouth. Both of those companies were antagonistic to the direct line, but in 1859 a through train service was operated in the face of obstructive tactics. The LBSCR controlled the route from Havant into Portsmouth, but eventually acquiesced in granting running powers, and making its line on Portsea Island, where the Portsmouth conurbation is situated, joint with the LSWR. The latter company took over the Portsmouth Railway in 1859.

The gradients on the line made it difficult to operate in steam days, but it was electrified on the third rail system in 1937. There was heavy traffic connected with the Royal Navy at Portsmouth, and holiday traffic to Hayling Island, Southsea and the Isle of Wight. While the former dominance of this traffic has reduced, the amount of London commuters has greatly increased, and the line maintains a busy passenger service.

== History ==
=== Early proposals ===
Portsmouth had long been an important centre for the Royal Navy and its support activities, and for ship construction and repair; it was also an important commercial port. In 1803 R. A. Edlington drew up proposals for a horse-drawn railway between Portsmouth and London; in the same year William Jessop proposed a horse railway from Blackfriars, London to Portsmouth, in part making use of the Surrey Iron Railway. Neither of these proposals was carried forward. Other schemes for a Portsmouth to London railway were put forward over the years, including, in 1844, a planned line to use the atmospheric system of traction.

The London and Southampton Railway (L&SR) opened throughout from London (Nine Elms) to Southampton on 11 May 1840. The L&SR and commercial interests in Portsmouth shared an aspiration for a Portsmouth rail connection, and a branch was proposed to run to Portsmouth from Bishopstoke (later renamed Eastleigh) on the L&SR, running through Fareham and Cosham. A parliamentary bill was presented in 1837 for a Portsmouth Junction Railway, friendly to the L&SR, to construct it. At this time there was considerable resentment among citizens of Portsmouth against Southampton, and this played against the idea of a branch line to Portsmouth off the Southampton main line: Portsmouth would get a roundabout route to London. The corporation opposed the bill in Parliament, and it failed.

The L&SR now put forward a branch from Bishopstoke to Gosport, close to Portsmouth but on the west side of the waterway known as Portsmouth Harbour. Requiring only 15 miles (24 km) of new line, this was an affordable proposition. An act, the Portsmouth Floating Bridge Act 1838 (1 & 2 Vict. c. xi), had lately been passed for a ferry, referred to then as a floating bridge, across the harbour between Portsmouth and Gosport. The L&SR obtained parliamentary authorisation in the London and South Western Railway (Portsmouth Branch Railway) Act 1839 (2 & 3 Vict. c. xxviii) for its Gosport branch on 4 June 1839; section 2 of the act authorised changing the company name to the London and South Western Railway (LSWR); this was a deliberate move to ameliorate tension between the towns of Portsmouth and Southampton. (Note: Portsmouth was given city status in 1926. Southampton gained it in 1964.) The Gosport line opened on 29 November 1841. For the time being, Portsmouth had its railway, although not the direct line it sought.

=== The Railway Mania ===
In 1844 money supply in the United Kingdom had become easier, and for the first time railway schemes were attractive investments. This meant that the established companies were no longer secure in their own territory, as challenging new schemes promoted locally were proposed. This led to the Railway Mania of 1845 when huge numbers of railway schemes, not all of them well thought out, were put before the public.

=== Woking to Guildford ===
Guildford Junction Railway Act 1844
- Act of Parliament
- Parliament of the United Kingdom
- Long title: An Act for making a Railway from the London and South-western Railway to Guildford in the County of Surrey.
- Citation: 7 & 8 Vict. c. v

Dates
- Royal assent: 10 May 1844

Guildford Junction Railway Act 1845
- Act of Parliament
- Parliament of the United Kingdom
- Long title: An Act for authorizing the Sale of the Guildford Junction Railway.
- Citation: 8 & 9 Vict. c. lxxxvi

Dates
- Royal assent: 21 July 1845

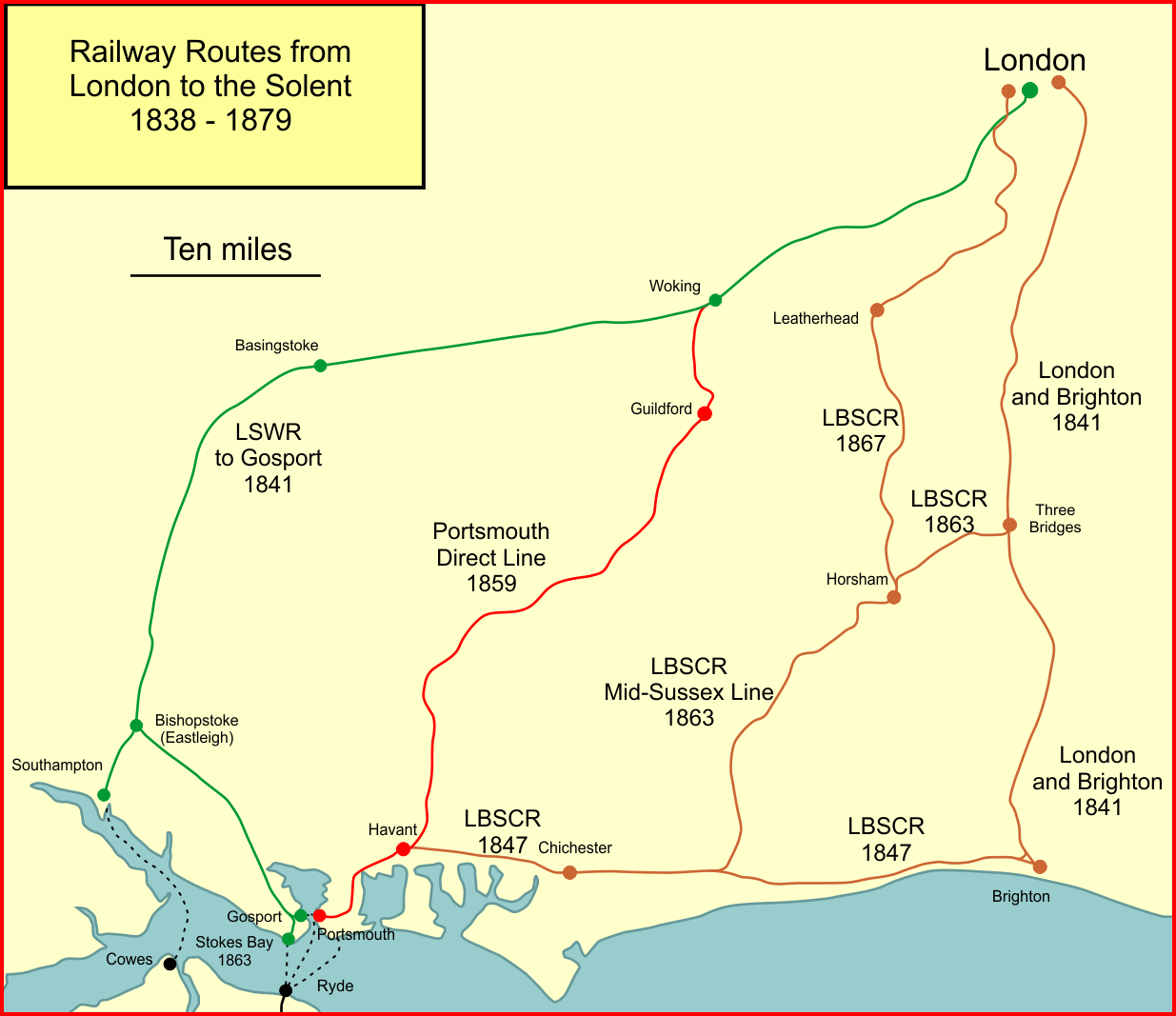
Portsmouth routes

The London and Southampton line ran through Woking, and on 10 May 1844 the Guildford Junction Railway was authorised by the Guildford Junction Railway Act 1844 (7 & 8 Vict. c. v) to construct a six-mile branch from there to the important manufacturing town of Guildford. The authorised share capital was £55,000. The company was backed by the LSWR; it opened four days late (because of doubts about the stability of the tunnel at Fareham) on 5 May 1845. (Note: Some authorities overlook the delay and quote 1 May.) The Guildford Junction Railway Act 1845 (8 & 9 Vict. c. lxxxvi) of 21 July authorised the company's absorption by the LSWR, and this was put into effect on 4 August 1845. The transfer cost the LSWR £75,000. It was the first part of the eventual Portsmouth Direct Line to become operational, although there is no evidence that this was the long-term objective.

The Guildford Junction line was planned to be laid using a novel—and almost certainly impractical—wooden permanent way system. The LSWR saw that Guildford would be a useful starting point for a railway to the south coast at Chichester, but the wooden track was an obvious objection. Nevertheless, an extension to Chichester linking with a planned line from Fareham offered the best chance of defeating a proposed Direct Portsmouth Railway. On 27 September 1844 the Guildford Junction company agreed to sell to the LSWR for £75,000. The LSWR agreed, but at its own expense the Guildford Junction was to complete its single line by 1 May 1845 in conventional track instead of wood, with earthworks and bridges suitable for later doubling.

=== Brighton and Chichester Railway, extending to Portsmouth ===
Brighton and Chichester (Portsmouth Extension) and London and South Western Railways Act 1847
- Act of Parliament
- Parliament of the United Kingdom
- Long title: An Act for authorizing the Sale of Part of the Brighton and Chichester (Portsmouth Extension) Railway to the London and South-western and the London, Brighton, and South Coast Railway Companies, and the Use by the last-mentioned Company of Part (Wandsworth to London) of the London and South-western Railway.
- Citation: 10 & 11 Vict. c. ccxliv

Dates
- Royal assent: 22 July 1847

Text of statute as originally enacted

The London and Brighton Railway had reached Shoreham-by-Sea (from Brighton) in 1844 and on 4 July the affiliated Brighton and Chichester Railway was authorised by the Brighton and Chichester Railway Act 1844 (7 & 8 Vict. lxvii) to extend from Shoreham to Chichester. While this was under construction, the Brighton and Chichester Railway obtained another act, the Railway from Portsmouth to Chichester Act 1845 (8 & 9 Vict. c. cxcix), on 8 August, to extend to Portsmouth. The Brighton company encouraged this, intending to get a share of the Portsmouth traffic.

Two other routes had been promoted in the same parliamentary session; one was a Guildford, Chichester and Portsmouth Railway, intended to run from the Guildford Junction line and through Godalming and Midhurst to Chichester and Portsmouth. This proposal was supported by the LSWR, but was thrown out by Parliament. At the same time the London and Croydon Railway (L&CR) had authorisation for an Epsom branch from Croydon, to be worked on the atmospheric system, in which stationary engines exhausted air from a pipe laid between the rails; the leading carriage of trains carried a piston which ran in the tube, and the air pressure differential propelled the train. The L&CR now proposed a Direct London and Portsmouth Railway which would run from Epsom via Dorking and Godalming to Portsmouth. This too was unsuccessful in Parliament.

The Portsmouth extension of the Chichester line ran along the coast to Havant, later the site of a junction with the Portsmouth Direct Line. It ran on to make a triangular junction; the northern spur ran to Cosham, there joining an LSWR spur from its Gosport branch, facing Bishopstoke (Eastleigh). The southern spur ran to Portsmouth, where there were two platform faces at a terminus on Commercial Road; the site later became Portsmouth & Southsea station. The junctions were Farlington Junction (east), Cosham Junction (west) and Portcreek Junction (south apex). From a point just west of Cosham station to Portsmouth was jointly owned by the LSWR and the Brighton and Chichester Railway (soon to be LBSCR); the Brighton and Chichester Railway owned the line from Cosham Junction and Portcreek Junction back to Chichester; and from west of Cosham to Fareham belonged to the LSWR.

In 1846 the London, Brighton and South Coast Railway (LBSCR) was formed by the London and Brighton Railway Act 1846 (9 & 10 Vict. c. cclxxxiii) of 27 July; the London and Brighton Railway and the London and Croydon Railway merged to form the LBSCR. The same act authorised the combined company to acquire the Brighton and Chichester Railway. The line from Chichester to Havant was opened on 15 March 1847; from Havant to Portsmouth on 14 June 1847; and from Farlington Junction to Cosham, for goods traffic, on 26 July 1848, and for passengers on 2 January 1860. From Portcreek Junction to Cosham Junction opened for goods on 1 September 1848, and for passengers on 1 October 1848.

=== Schemes in 1846 ===
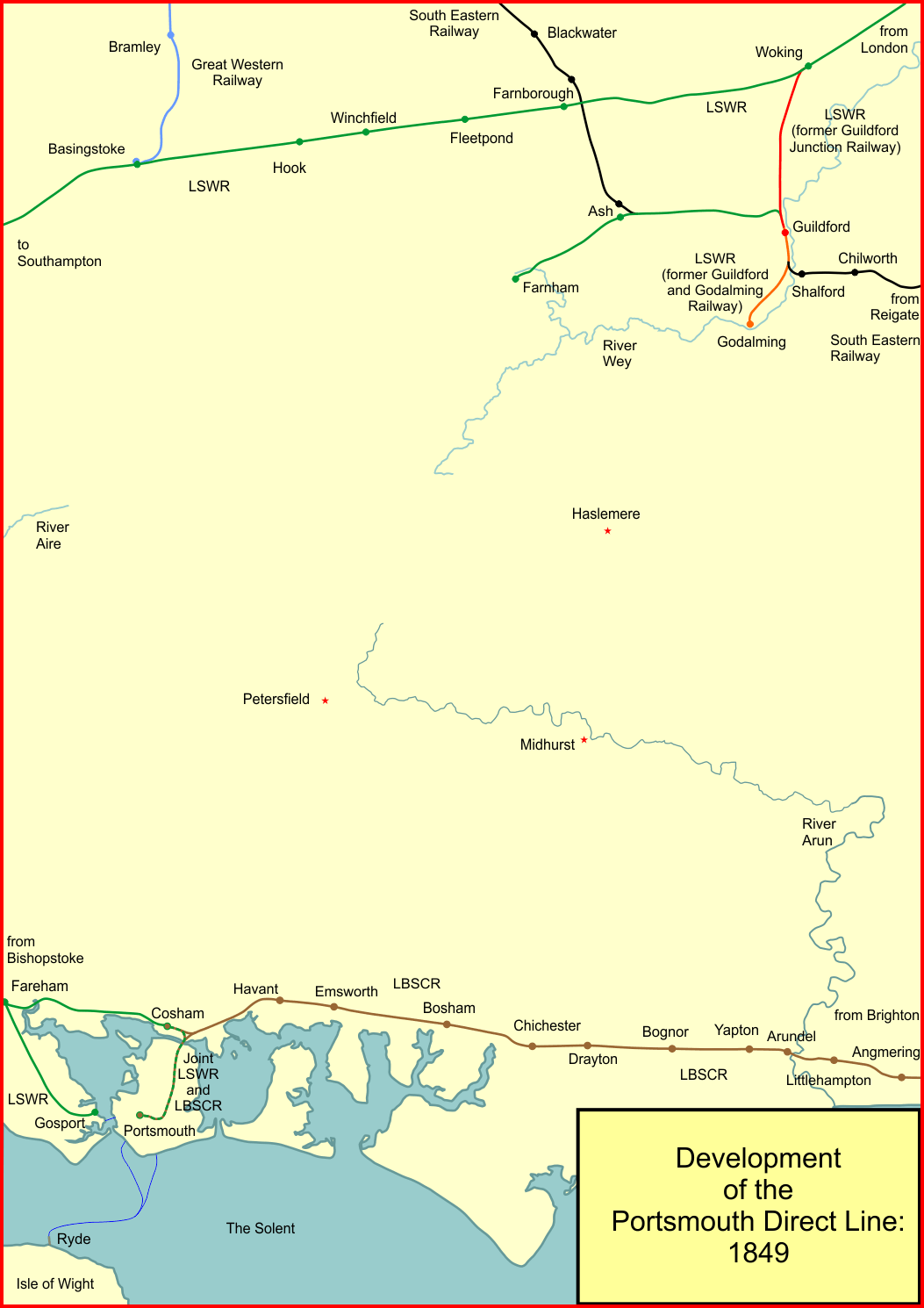
First steps towards the Portsmouth Direct line in 1849

The formation of the London Brighton and South Coast Railway shifted the supportive relations with the LSWR. Negotiations had taken place between the LSWR and the London and Brighton Railway, and the London and Croydon Railway had attributed bad faith to the LSWR. These feelings were carried into the LBSCR, and marked tension now existed between the LSWR and the LBSCR.

Guildford Extension and Portsmouth and Fareham Railway Act 1846
- Act of Parliament
- Parliament of the United Kingdom
- Long title: An Act for authorizing the Sale of the Guildford Junction Railway, and for enabling the Purchasers to maintain the same, and to make and maintain a Railway therefrom to Godalming, and from the London and South-western Railway at Fareham to Portsmouth.
- Citation: 9 & 10 Vict. c. cclii

Dates
- Royal assent: 27 July 1846

London and South-western Railway Company's Portsmouth Extensions and Godalming Deviation Act 1847
- Act of Parliament
- Parliament of the United Kingdom
- Long title: An Act for enabling the London and South-western Railway Company to make Extensions of the Guildford Extension and Portsmouth and Fareham Railway near Portsmouth, and a Deviation in the authorized Line thereof near Godalming.
- Citation: 10 & 11 Vict. c. cxlv

Dates
- Royal assent: 9 July 1847

Text of statute as originally enacted

In Parliament, the Guildford, Chichester, Portsmouth and Fareham proposal was considerably reduced in scope and became the Guildford Extension and Portsmouth and Fareham Railway. Its act, the Guildford Extension and Portsmouth and Fareham Railway Act 1846 (9 & 10 Vict. c. cclii) of 27 July only authorised disconnected sections from Guildford to Godalming and from Fareham to Portsea Junction. At Godalming it would form a junction with the intended Direct London and Portsmouth Railway. The act also included the power to purchase the Guildford Junction Railway and operate it as a continuous line from the LSWR at Woking to Godalming and then use running powers over the planned Direct London and Portsmouth Railway. The LSWR was authorised to acquire the company in the same act of 1846 and exercised that right by the London and South-western Railway Company's Portsmouth Extensions and Godalming Deviation Act 1847 (10 & 11 Vict. c. cxlv) of 9 July.

The Guildford to Godalming section (now part of the LSWR) opened on 15 October 1849, after a delay when the tunnel at Guildford partly collapsed. The line closed again from 22 to 24 October 1849 from the same cause.

=== Direct London and Portsmouth Railway ===
Direct London and Portsmouth Railway Act 1846
- Act of Parliament
- Parliament of the United Kingdom
- Long title: An Act for making a Railway from the Croydon and Epsom Railway at Epsom to the Town of Portsmouth, to be called "The Direct London and Portsmouth Railway."
- Citation: 9 & 10 Vict. c. lxxxiii

Dates
- Royal assent: 26 June 1846

The Direct London and Portsmouth Railway line was authorised by the Direct London and Portsmouth Railway Act 1846 (9 & 10 Vict. c. lxxxiii) on 26 June 1846, to run from Epsom via Godalming to a Portsmouth terminus. For a time this seemed to be a future Portsmouth main line, but in 1847 it submitted a further bill proposing to sell its line to the LBSCR. By this time Parliament had become hostile to railway schemes floated simply to sell on to existing lines, and the bill was thrown out. This had the immediate effect of killing off the Direct London and Portsmouth Railway Company.

=== Portsmouth Railway ===
Direct London and Portsmouth Railway Act 1854
- Act of Parliament
- Parliament of the United Kingdom
- Long title: An Act to authorize Agreements between the Direct London and Portsmouth Railway Company and the Portsmouth Railway Company, and for winding up the Affairs of the Direct London and Portsmouth Railway Company.
- Citation: 17 & 18 Vict. c. ccviii

Dates
- Royal assent: 31 July 1854

Text of statute as originally enacted

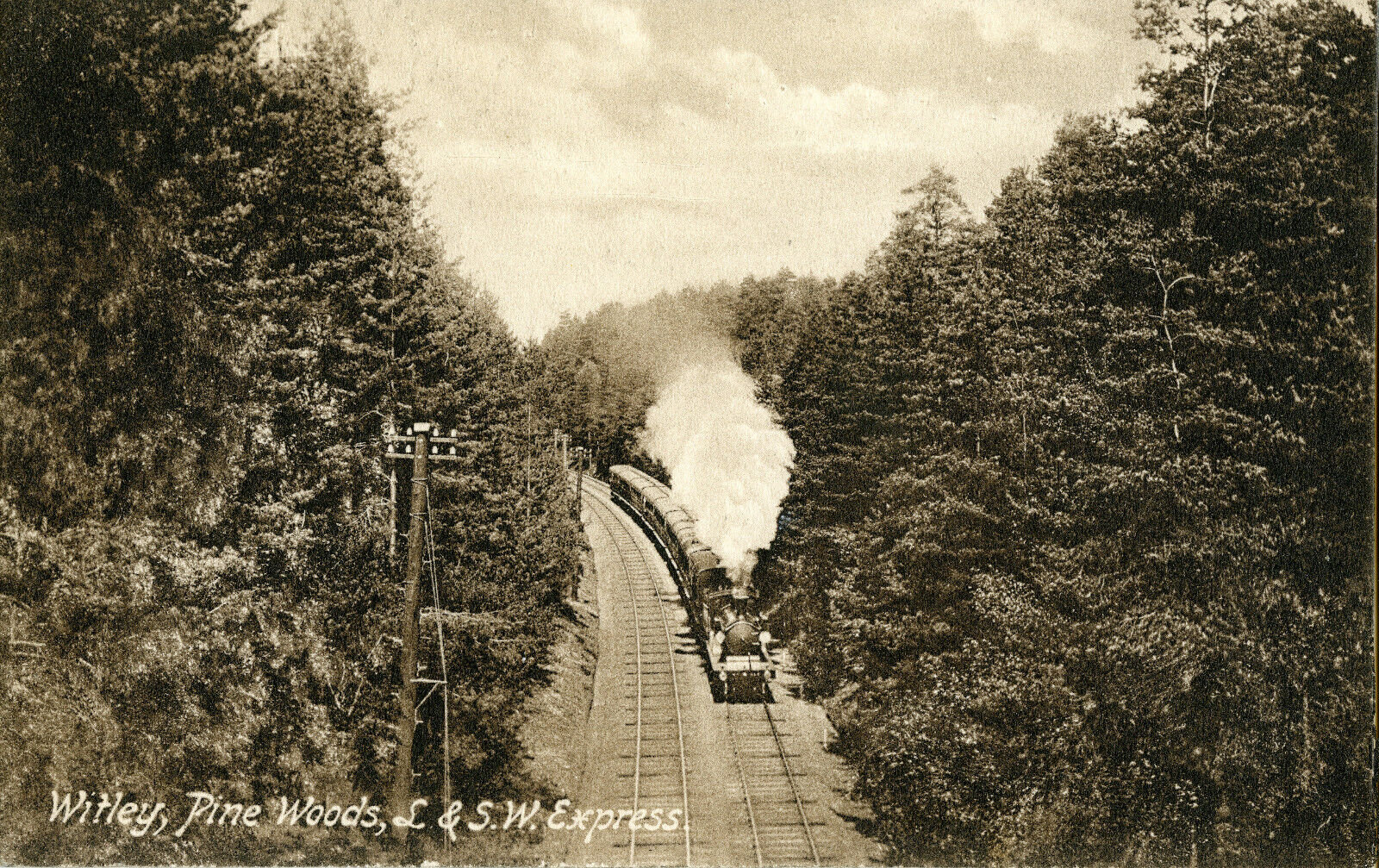
An express train on the Portsmouth Direct Line north of Witley

The future Portsmouth Direct Line was now in place from Woking to Godalming, and from Havant to Portsmouth & Southsea station. In 1852 the Portsmouth Railway was promoted, advancing a similar route to the Direct London and Portsmouth Railway, and hoping to adopt its assets; the Direct London and Portsmouth Railway Company was wound up by the Direct London and Portsmouth Railway Act 1854 (17 & 18 Vict. c. ccviii) of 31 July.

Portsmouth Railway Act 1853
- Act of Parliament
- Parliament of the United Kingdom
- Long title: An Act for making a Railway from Havant in the County of Southampton to Godalming in the County of Surrey, to be called "The Portsmouth Railway;" and for other Purposes.
- Citation: 16 & 17 Vict. c. xcix

Dates
- Royal assent: 8 July 1853

Text of statute as originally enacted

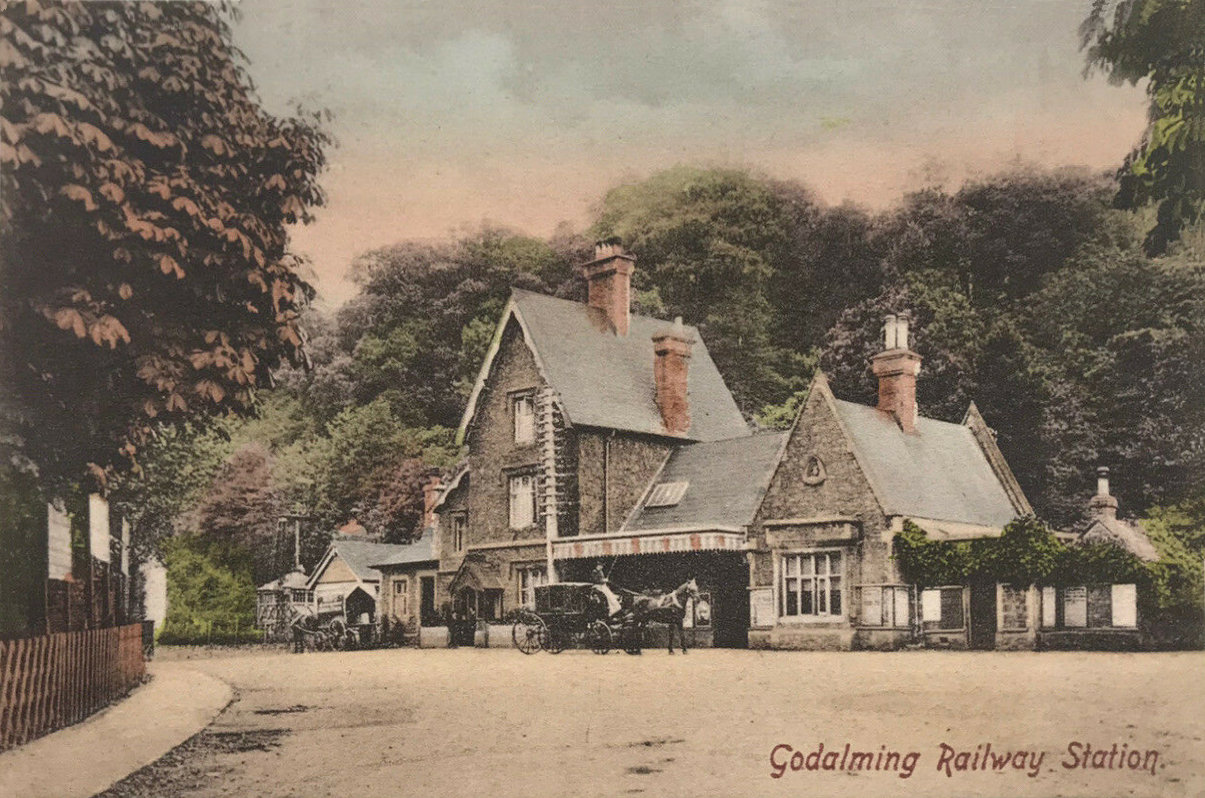
Godalming station exterior

The Portsmouth Railway got its authorising act, the Portsmouth Railway Act 1853 (16 & 17 Vict. c. xcix) on 8 July 1853, for a 32 1/4 mile route from Godalming (LSWR, at a junction just north of the original terminus) to Havant (LBSCR, on the line from Chichester to Portsmouth). The LSWR and the LBSCR both opposed the scheme in Parliament. Authorised share capital was £400,000. The contractor Thomas Brassey undertook the construction. The line would make London to Portsmouth a distance of 73 miles; Waterloo—Bishopstoke—Portsmouth was 95 3/4 miles. (Waterloo to Gosport was about 86 miles, and London Bridge—Brighton—Portsmouth was 95 1/4.) Meanwhile, the Portsmouth Railway directors considered how it could make a connection to an existing railway's network. The LSWR and LBSCR hostility was obvious, but the South Eastern Railway (SER) had a line not far away, just south of Guildford at Shalford; perhaps a connection to their line, and thence to London via Redhill, would be feasible.

A Railway commencing by a Junction with the Line of the London, Brighton, and South Coast Railway (Portsmouth and Chichester Branch) at or near the Havant Station on the last-mentioned Railway in the Parish of Havant in the County of Southampton, and terminating by a Junction with the London and South-western Railway at or near to the Godalming Station of the last-mentioned Railway in the Parish of Godalming in the County of Surrey, with all proper Works and Conveniences connected therewith and Approaches thereto. — Section 4, Portsmouth Railway Act 1853 (16 & 17 Vict. c. xcix)

Portsmouth Railway Amendment Act 1854
- Act of Parliament
- Parliament of the United Kingdom
- Long title: An Act to enable the Portsmouth Railway Company to make certain Alterations in the Line and Levels of their Railway, and to extend their said Line from Godalming to Shalford; and for other Purposes.
- Citation: 17 & 18 Vict. c. clxxxvi

Dates
- Royal assent: 24 July 1854

Text of statute as originally enacted

On 24 July 1854 the company got authorisation in the Portsmouth Railway Amendment Act 1854 (17 & 18 Vict. c. clxxxvi) to extend northwards from Godalming to join the SER, a new line running broadly parallel to the LSWR line, and building a new south-to-east curve to join the SER.

It shall be lawful for the said Company to construct the Line of Railway herein-after mentioned in extension of the said Portsmouth Railway; (that is to say,)

- A Railway in extension of and commencing from and out of the Main Line of the Portsmouth Railway as authorized to be made in or near a certain Field in the Parish of Godalming in the said County of Surrey numbered 144 on the Plans referred to in "The Portsmouth Railway Act, 1853," and terminating by a Junction with the Reading, Guildford, and Reigate Line of the South-eastern Railway Company in the Parishes of Shulford and Saint Nicholas, Guildford, or One of them, in the said County of Surrey, at or near the Point where the said Line crosses the River Wey, where it forms the Boundary between the said Parishes of Shalford and Saint Nicholas, Guildford.
— Section 4, Portsmouth Railway Amendment Act 1854 (17 & 18 Vict. c. clxxxvi)

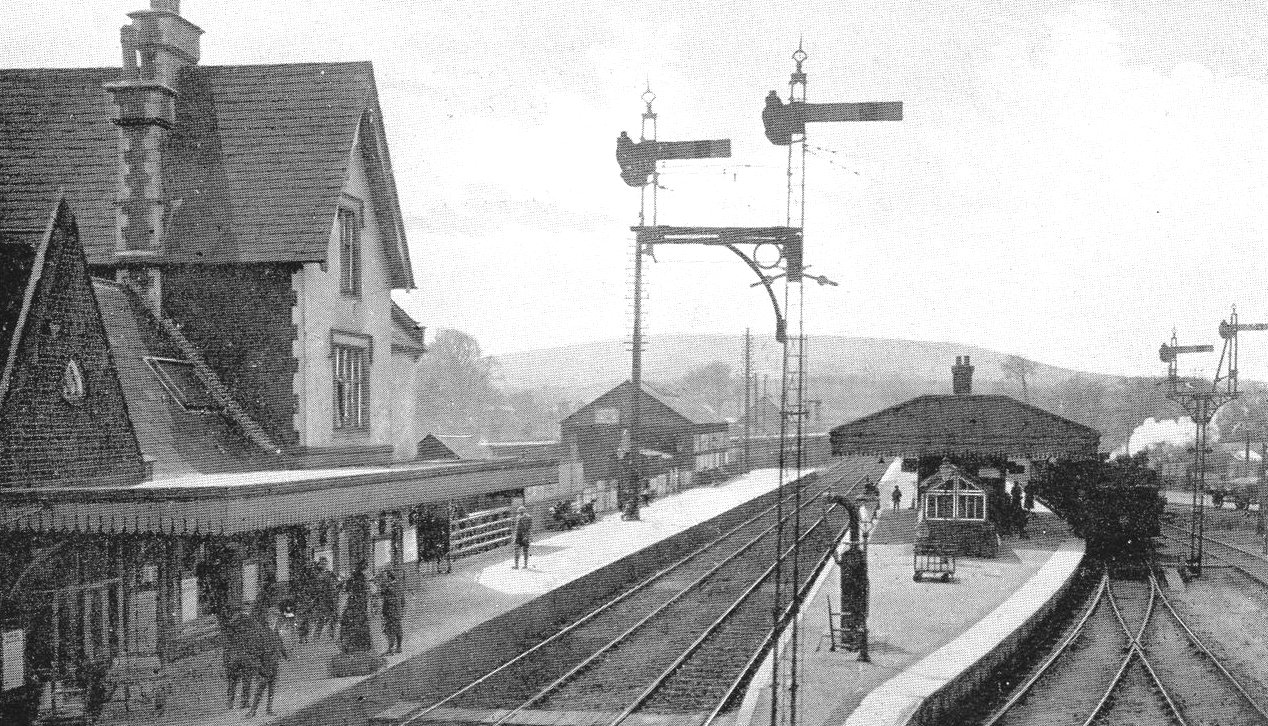
Petersfield station in Edwardian times

This would have been an extremely long route to London, and in any case it was defeated when negotiations with the SER and the LBSCR for traffic running over their lines failed. It appears that the SER board had an anti-expansion policy at the time. In 1857 the Portsmouth Railway agreed with the LSWR on access to the LSWR line at Godalming to Shalford. The earthworks at Shalford forming a south to east curve to the SER line were completed, but no track was ever laid on it. (Note: The growth of trees on the formation may be seen in satellite images; the River Wey was crossed by a timber trestle bridge, but Sekon, writing in 1947 said that "through the ravages of time this has long since disappeared" (page 167).) Negotiations to lease the line to the LSWR foundered because of the LSWR's insistence on gaining LBSCR acquiescence, (Note: To comply with territorial exclusivity agreements.) which was not forthcoming. At length however the LSWR was motivated by fear that a rival company would indeed take over the line, gaining access deep inside the LSWR territory. On 24 August 1858 the LSWR agreed to lease the Portsmouth Railway's line for £18,000 per annum.

The LBSCR at once protested. There were a complex of territorial and traffic-sharing agreements between the LSWR and the LBSCR, relating to the joint line at Portsmouth and elsewhere. These had lately been ignored to some extent by the LBSCR but now legal measures were threatened. So difficult did the relationship become, that the LSWR considered building an independent line at Portsmouth to escape from the joint line there. The obstruction culminated in threatened direct action when, on 1 January 1859, the LSWR Portsmouth Railway was due to open.

=== The battle of Havant ===
The LSWR decided to force the issue by running a goods train on 28 December 1858; it arrived at Havant at about 07:00 while it was still dark, with about 80 workmen on board. The LBSCR had removed the switch tongue of the Portsmouth Railway down line at the junction, so the goods train was crossed to the up line to by-pass it, but it was again stopped in Havant station by the removal of another rail section, now blocking all lines.

The LBSCR local manager reported:

About 7.0 am this morning, the Direct Portsmouth people... arrived at Havant junction with a goods train, two engines and about eighty men, and demanded passage along the line, threatening the switchman with immediate imprisonment unless he gave up the tongue of the points. He, however, refused and they then placed eight or ten men on our engine [that was blocking the way]... and shunted the engine aside. They then drew their own train along our up road through the station, crossing on to the down line, blocking both up and down roads. In the meantime, we had removed a piece of rail from our own down line to the west of the crossing, effectually preventing them from proceeding. I suggested to [the LSWR manager] that, having now endeavoured to force their way through and being resisted also by force, whether he had not done enough to enable them to try the right before a proper tribunal, and requested him to withdraw. This he refused, and as I refused to replace the rails or allow them to proceed, matters remained in this condition until about 1.0 pm. I worked the traffic over the line between Havant and Portsmouth on the one side and Havant and Emsworth on the other, by bringing empty trains and engines on both sides of the obstruction and getting the passengers across on foot... At 1.0 pm [the LSWR Manager] made up his mind to withdraw under protest... They further refused to pledge themselves not to make a similar attempt at any time, and I have accordingly been obliged to remain at Havant with two engines and men to watch their proceedings.

Whether physical violence took place is uncertain, but with numerous employees on each side and tempers running high it is likely that scuffles broke out.

=== Continuing friction with the LBSCR ===
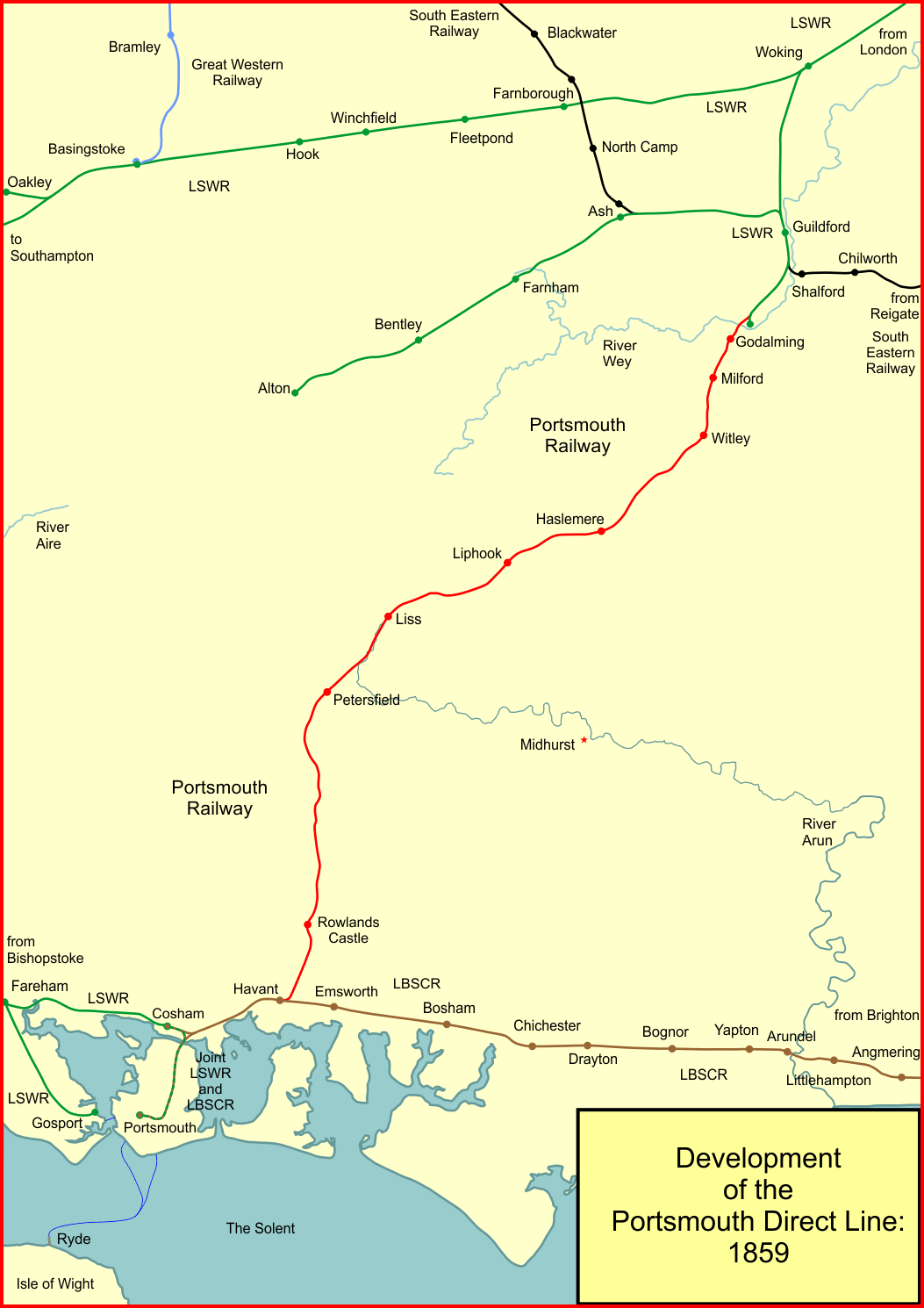
The Portsmouth Direct line in 1859

The Portsmouth Railway opened to Havant only, on 1 January 1859 and the issue of through running went to an arbitrator; his award was rejected, and the LBSCR obtained an injunction, preventing the LSWR from using the joint line. However, when the injunction came before Vice Chancellor Wood on 19 January 1859 he refused the restraining order, but did not adjudicate on the terms of use of the line. During the course of legal proceedings an order was given that the line throughout from Havant should be made part of the joint railway, but this was never actually done. Through running of Portsmouth Railway trains started on 24 January 1859, tolerated by the LBSCR without prejudice to its legal position, pending further negotiations. The negotiations made no progress whatever, and in March 1859 the LBSCR introduced new through trains with very low fares. The LSWR soon retaliated with its own new trains and low fares.

London and South Western and Portsmouth Railways Amalgamation Act 1859
- Act of Parliament
- Parliament of the United Kingdom
- Long title: An Act for authorizing an Amalgamation or Lease of the Portsmouth Railway with or to the London and South-western Railway Company, and for other Purposes.
- Citation: 22 & 23 Vict. c. xxxi

Dates
- Royal assent: 21 July 1859

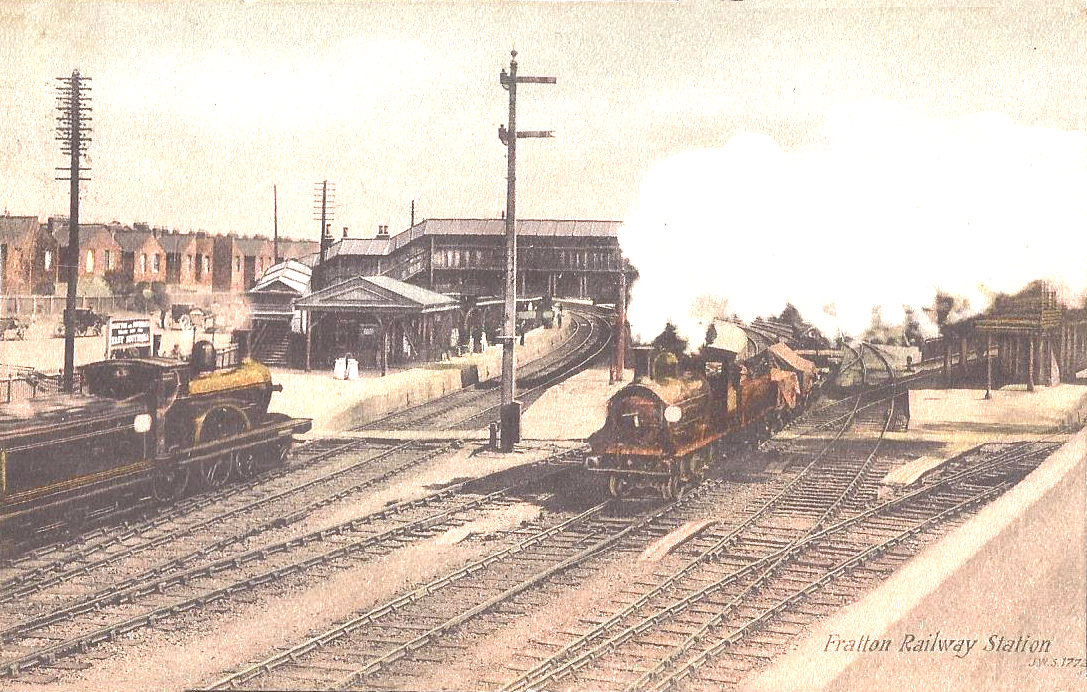
Fratton station

The LBSCR had appealed against the refusal to grant its injunction, and in April 1859 reserved judgment was given in favour of the LBSCR position: LSWR trains over the direct route had to be discontinued, and LSWR trains had to be terminated before Havant, at a temporary station immediately north of Havant LBSCR, with the passengers being conveyed on to Portsmouth by road. Remarkably the shareholders of the Portsmouth Railway – the line was leased to the LSWR by them – demanded an increase in the rental charge. This was declined and eventually the status quo was agreed; in fact the Portsmouth Railway was amalgamated with the LSWR by the London and South Western and Portsmouth Railways Amalgamation Act 1859 (22 & 23 Vict. c. xxxi) of 21 July.

The hostility with the LBSCR could hardly continue indefinitely and in early August 1859, agreement was reached; a new pooling arrangement for passenger fares being agreed, as was rental for use of the joint line. Through trains over the Portsmouth Railway route resumed on 8 August 1859. On 2 January 1860 the Farlington Junction to Cosham Junction section, on which the track had been removed by the LBSCR in the face of the disagreement, was reinstated and four passenger trains daily used it. The Havant to Portcreek Junction section remained in LBSCR ownership, but running powers were granted to the LSWR.

=== Competing routes ===
The first route from London to Portsmouth, actually Gosport, had been 89 miles in length. When the Brighton and Chichester Railway was extended to Portsmouth, the route from London Bridge via Brighton (reversing there) was 95 miles. The LBSCR, successor to the Chichester company, promoted an affiliate company, the Mid-Sussex Railway, which completed a route from Horsham to Arundel Junction, about ten miles east of Chichester. It opened in 1863. At first Horsham was reached via Three Bridges but the line from Leatherhead to Horsham completed the route in 1877.

=== Early passenger services ===
The London and South Western and Portsmouth Railways Amalgamation Act 1859 (22 & 23 Vict. c. xxxi), authorising amalgamation of the LSWR and the Portsmouth Railway, had included clauses specifying a minimum passenger service: six daily in summer and four daily in winter. For some years the LSWR provided only this minimum service on the Portsmouth Railway route, continuing to run good services to Gosport. In fact the LSWR wanted to avoid the route overshadowing the longer original route via Bishopstoke, and Direct Line passenger services remained slow and infrequent. The working timetable for April 1865 shows only four passenger trains and one goods train per day on the line.

=== Extending to the harbour ===
The Portsmouth terminus of the line was at the present-day Portsmouth & Southsea station. There was considerable ferry traffic to the Isle of Wight and to Gosport, involving road transfers through the streets of Portsmouth. Southsea was developing as an important resort, and it too was remote from the Portsmouth station. In 1859 the Portsmouth council promoted a tramway, but this scheme, together with some other, independent, proposals, failed.

Southsea Pier was opened in 1861, on the southern side of Portsmouth; it was later renamed Clarence Pier. An independent Landport and Southsea Tramway built a horse-drawn street-running line from the Portsmouth station to Clarence Pier and this became the main embarkation point for train to ferry passengers; the tram conveyed a luggage trolley vehicle, and it had first and second class accommodation. The Clarence Pier tramway opened on 15 May 1865. There was a Victoria Pier at the end of Portsmouth High Street, not tramway connected.

The entire arrangement was still highly unsatisfactory and in 1872 an extension line and pier similar to the present-day locations was independently promoted. It failed in Parliament but the LSWR and the LBSCR put forward their own extension and pier in the 1873 session. The Joint Portsmouth Railway Extension Act 1873 (36 & 37 Vict. c. cxviii) was passed on 7 July 1873, for a line climbing steeply at first from Portsmouth station to a point south of The Hard. It was 1 mile 6 chains (1.08 miles, 1.73 km) in length. An additional £120,000 of share capital was authorised, and there were to be two short branches for the naval authorities, to Watering Island Jetty and to the Old Gun Wharf. The extension was opened to traffic on 2 October 1876, and London trains generally now used the Harbour station, but other trains terminated at the Town station.

=== Main line improvements ===
Other improvements were undertaken at this period: the line between Godalming Junction and Havant was doubled from 1875: the dates were:

- Godalming to Witley 1 June 1875;
- Witley to Haslemere 2 October 1876;
- Haslemere to Liphook 1 January 1877;
- Liphook to Liss 9 July 1877;
- Liss to Rowlands Castle 1 April 1878;
- Rowlands Castle to Havant 4 June 1877.

When the Portsmouth Railway was constructed, it bypassed the original Godalming terminus, although a passenger service to it was retained for the time being. It was closed to passengers on 1 May 1897.

== Electrification ==
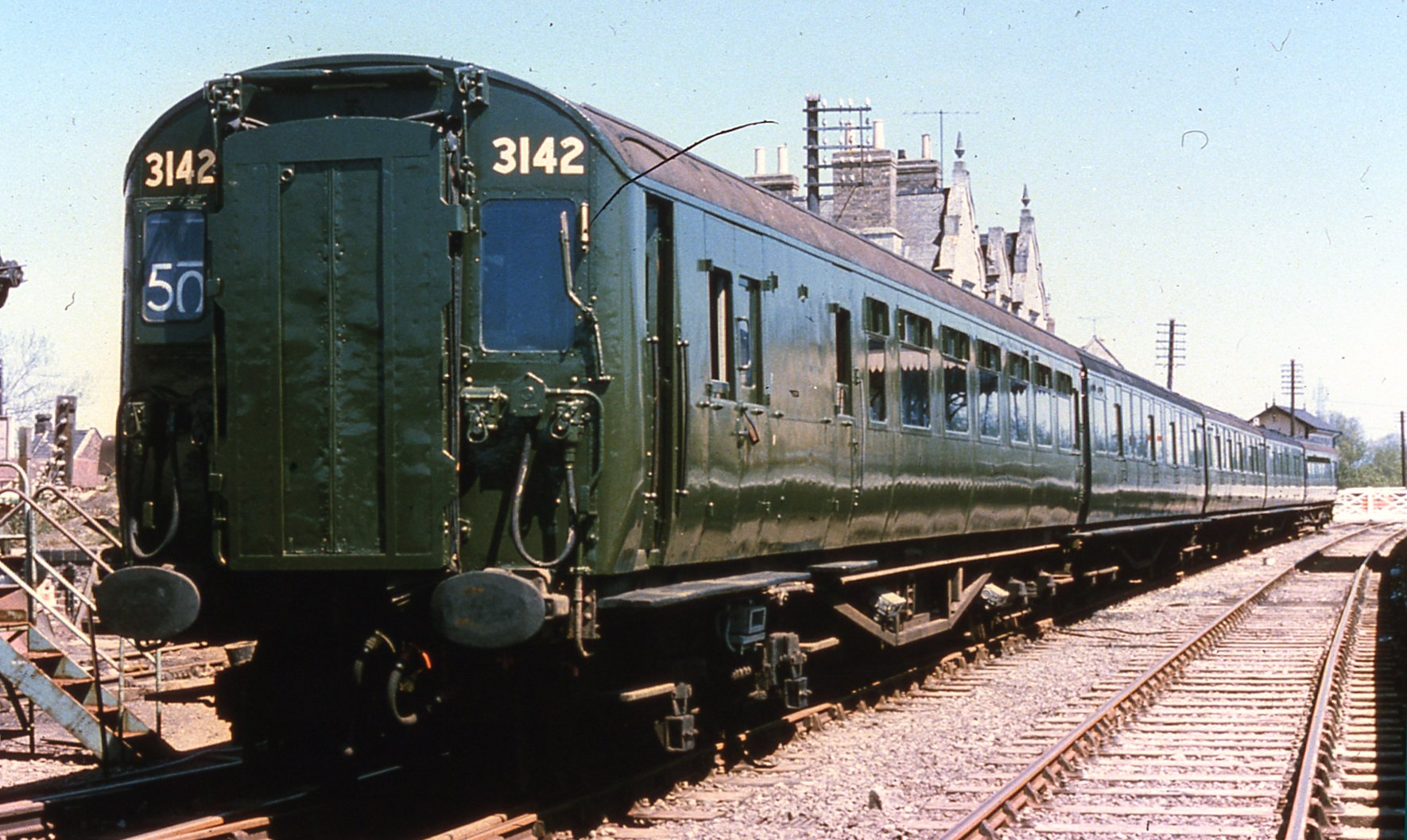
A preserved 4-COR unit

The Southern Railway, as successor to the LSWR, had embarked on a series of electrification schemes, and these had had a remarkable effect on improved business and reduced costs. After the successful implementation of such schemes between London and Brighton, and Hastings, it was decided to electrify through to Portsmouth. This was to be the longest route so far undertaken.

The scheme was announced in 1935; at this time the main line from Waterloo was electrified as far as Hampton Court Junction, so the work was to be from there via Woking and Guildford to Portsmouth Harbour. Loans at low interest rates were made available by the government, under the Railways (Agreement) Act 1935 (26 Geo. 5 & 1 Edw. 8. c. 6). (Note: The purpose was to encourage large capital projects, in order to stimulate British industry.)

Haslemere, Havant, Portsmouth & Southsea and Portsmouth Harbour stations were all greatly enlarged to give 800 feet (244 m) platform lengths to handle twelve-car trains. Resignalling was undertaken at Woking Junction and Havant, but complete resignalling was not thought to be needed. Partial signalling improvements were commissioned in June and July 1937, and the electric train service started on 4 July 1937, although numerous trial runs had already been undertaken.

A fleet of 312 new or rebuilt vehicles were provided for the entire scheme, which included routes to Alton and Staines. Fast services were operated by a new design of four-car express unit; they were provided with corridors throughout, including from one unit to the next when running in multiple formations. Restaurant facilities were provided in most express trains, which generally ran as twelve coach trains, formed 4-COR + 4-RES + 4-COR. The 4-RES units had restaurant facilities; 19 were built; there were 29 units designated 4-COR, without catering facilities. These were designated class 404 in British Railways days. The outer vehicles in each set were motor coaches, equipped with two 225 hp (168 kW) English Electric motors, and English Electric electro-pneumatic control equipment.

For stopping trains (including on the Alton line), 38 two-car units designated 2-BIL were produced; these had side corridors and lavatories, but no corridor connection between the coaches. They had one control trailer coach and one motor coach equipped with two 275 hp (205 kW) motors and Metropolitan-Vickers control equipment. New maintenance sheds were provided at Fratton (and also at Wimbledon and Farnham); the Fratton shed had four roads each capable of holding eight cars.

Electric trains started running to steam train timings to Guildford from 3 January 1937, and Portsmouth & Southsea station was first reached by an electric service on 8 March 1937. There was a Royal Navy Fleet Review at Portsmouth on 20 May 1937 to commemorate the coronation of King George VI, and twenty 12-car special electric trains ran between London and Portsmouth in connection, in addition to the ordinary steam service. On 1 July 1937 an official inaugural run took place to Portsmouth & Southsea, reached in 91 minutes, and the return run making the standard stops for the new train service with one additional stop at Surbiton accomplished the journey in 99 minutes. There had been some concern about the ability to keep time as the 12-car trains had slightly less installed power than the corresponding earlier Brighton line formations and the hilly route was more challenging, but these concerns proved unnecessary. A speed of 78 mph (126 km) was recorded descending Witley bank.

Full public services started on 4 July 1937. The standard off-peak service was one express train per hour and two stopping. The express called at Guildford, Haslemere, Portsmouth & Southsea and ran to Portsmouth Harbour; the stopping trains called at Surbiton and then all stations to Portsmouth & Southsea; one stopping train per hour was overtaken at Guildford by the corresponding express. Alton portions ran with the stopping trains, being detached at Woking.

The new service was a considerable success, and this was particularly so for the summer holiday traffic; the express service was modified on summer Saturdays to give good connections to the Isle of Wight and to Hayling Island. In 1947 the line carried 7.25 million passengers, compared to 3 million in 1936. The summer Saturday timetable gave four fast restaurant-car trains an hour from 07:45 to 16:50; even on summer Sunday mornings there were three fast trains an hour.

== Train services from 1971 ==
After electrification, the basic train service remained unaltered for many years, but in 1971 was changed to one fast, one semi-fast and one stopping train per hour. Additional stops were later added to the semi-fast train.

This pattern continued into the 1990s, but by 1996 it had changed to two fast trains per hour from Waterloo, a semi-fast and an hourly shuttle from Guildford to Haslemere.

=== Present day timetable ===
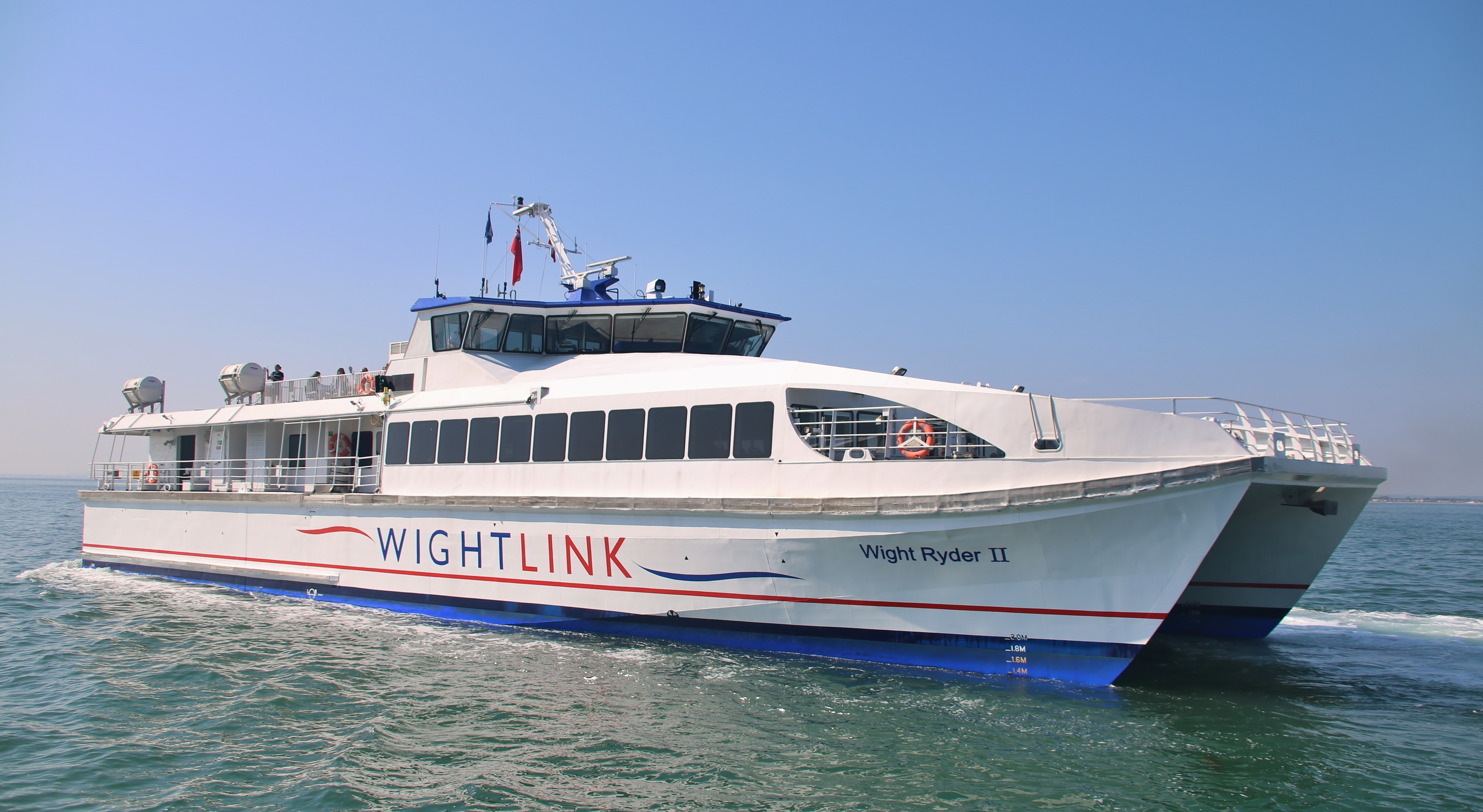
Wightlink catamaran ferries convey foot passengers from Portsmouth Harbour to Ryde Pier Head.

As of December 2025, the off-peak Monday to Friday service consists of 2tph (trains per hour) from London Waterloo to Portsmouth Harbour (1 fast, 1 stopping) and 1tph (stopping) to Haslemere.

=== Rolling stock development ===
From 1970 to 2004, the predominant rolling stock consisted of the Class 421 (4CIG) and Class 423 (4VEP) units, with fast trains up to the early 1990s also including a Class 412 (4BEP) buffet unit in the centre of the 12-car consist (Class 422 (4BIG) before mid-1983). Some peak trains were augmented using 2-car Class 414 (2HAP) units until 1991. During most of the 1990s, Class 442 "Wessex Electric" units operated most of the fast services.

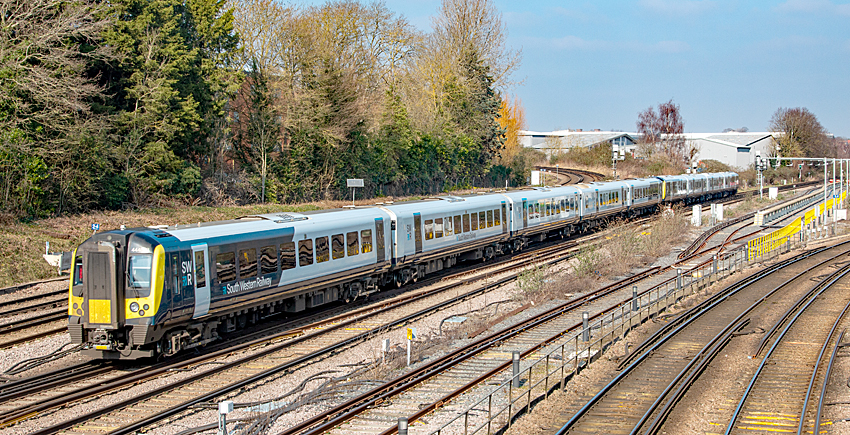
Class 444 and Class 450 leaving Guildford on the up line

Since 2007, services had been provided mostly by Class 444, supported by Class 450, electric multiple units. Unusually, the 450s, designed for stopping services, run certain fast services on Monday to Friday and most services on Saturday. This has led to complaints by people who disliked the high density 3+2 seating in some parts of these trains. From January 2020, following an extended cascading process, partially refitted class 442 'Wessex Electrics' started to bolster the class 444 on both Portsmouth and Poole services. the Class 442s were withdrawn from service in March 2021.

== Topography of the line ==
=== Gradients ===
The central part of the route, from Guildford to Havant, runs through relatively thinly populated country. The line was designed on the "undulating principle"; that is, successive relatively steep gradients were accepted to reduce construction cost. In the days of steam operation this made the route difficult for enginemen.

The line falls at 1 in 152 from Woking Junction to Worplesdon, then climbing at 1 in 111 for a mile and falling at 116 to Guildford. After gentle gradients, the line then climbs from Farncombe to Haslemere for nine miles, stiffening to 1 in 80. It then falls at 1 in 100 and 1 in 80 with intermittent respites to Liss, nine miles. A second climb of three miles (5 km) at 1 in 100 / 1 in 110 follows to a summit at Buriton Tunnel, then falling at 1 in 80, 1 in 100 and then more gently for 8 miles (13 km) to Havant. After Havant the gradients are considerably more gentle, with the exception of the short sharp climb at Portsmouth & Southsea on to the Harbour line.

== Chronology ==
Stations in bold are still open.

Woking Junction to Guildford: opened by the Guildford Junction Railway 5 May 1845

- **Worplesdon**; opened 1 March 1883;
- **Guildford**;

Guildford to Godalming: opened by the LSWR 15 October 1849

- Guildford St Catherine's Tunnel; emergency station south of the tunnel open from 23 March 1895 to 1 April 1895 owing to the partial collapse of the tunnel;
- **Farncombe**; opened 1 May 1897;
- Godalming; renamed Godalming (Old) 1 January 1859; closed to passengers 1 May 1897; closed completely 1969;

Godalming (junction immediately north of Old station) to Havant: opened by the Portsmouth Railway 1 January 1859

- Godalming (New); renamed **Godalming** from 1 May 1897;
- **Milford**;
- Witley & Chiddingfold; renamed Witley; renamed Witley for Chiddingfold 1912; renamed **Witley** 6 October 1947;
- **Haslemere**;
- **Liphook**;
- **Liss**;
- **Petersfield**;
- Woodcroft Halt, also known as Ditcham Park Halt, opened 26 August 1943, and closed July 1946;
- **Rowland's Castle**;
- Havant New; emergency station opened 1 January 1859 during prohibition on running over LBSC line; closed 24 January 1859;

Havant to Portcreek Junction: opened by the LBSCR 15 March 1847

- **Havant**;
- Bedhampton Halt; opened 1 April 1906; renamed **Bedhampton** 5 May 1969;
- (Farlington Junction; line to Cosham diverges);
- Farlington Race Course opened 26 June 1891: intermittently disused; renamed Farlington Halt 17 June 1928. Closed 4 July 1937;
- (Portcreek Junction; line from Cosham converges)

Portcreek Junction to Portsmouth & Southsea: opened by the LBSCR 14 June 1847; joint with LSWR from 1848

- Hilsea Halt; opened to factory workers October 1937; public use from 2 November 1941; renamed **Hilsea** 5 May 1969;
- Fratton; opened 1 July 1885; renamed Fratton & Southsea 4 July 1905; renamed **Fratton** 1 December 1921;
- Portsmouth; renamed Portsmouth Town 2 October 1876; renamed **Portsmouth & Southsea** from 1925;

Portsmouth Harbour extension railway, opened 2 October 1876

- Portsmouth Town (high level station regarded as part of main station); renamed **Portsmouth & Southsea** from 1925);
- **Portsmouth Harbour**.

== See also ==
- London and South Western Railway
- Railway electrification in Great Britain
