= List of places in the Godalming hundred =

Places in the ancient Godalming hundred of Surrey (with their probable meanings) include:

- Alfold ("old enclosure")
- Amberley (Imberlēah meaning "riverside clearing")
- Artington (from heorotingdon meaning "hill of the people of the sacred hart"
- Bagmoor (possibly from the personal name Bacca + Moor, or perhaps meaning "badger's moor")
- Binscombe (from possible Brythonic personal name Buden + Combe, meaning "Buden's Valley")
- Brook (Brōc meaning "fast flowing stream" in Old English; cognate with Dutch broek, German bruch)
- Busbridge (Bus + bridge, perhaps referring to the old bridge over the lake)
- Catteshall (Gattes Hill meaning "gate or route to hill")
- Chiddingfold (Chadingesfold meaning "enclosure of the people of the hollow")
- Chinthurst (Chint + hurst, the second word means "wooded hill")
- Compton (Probably a corruption of comb + tun meaning "valley estate")
- Cosford (probably from "Cusa's Ford" but possibly from Welsh cors meaning bog, fen; hence "bog by the ford")
- Culmer (Col mere meaning "cool or deep lake")
- Cut Mill ("mill in the valley")
- Dunsfold ("hilltop enclosure")
- Eashing ("people of Essa")
- Elstead (Ellested meaning "Place where the Elder trees grow")
- Emley or Bowlhead Green (Eme lēah meaning "Ema's Clearing")
- Enton (unknown, derived from En + tun, possibly "estate end")
- Farncombe (Fernecome meaning "marshy valley")
- Feathercombe (possibly meaning "wooded valley")
- Frillinghurst ("the wooded hill of the people of the forest edge")
- Godalming (Godhelm Ingas meaning "the people of Godhelm")
- Grafham (Grafhæm meaning "farm by the grove")
- Hambledon (Hameledūn probably meaning "flat-topped hill")
- Hankley (Hank + lēah, meaning either "Hank's clearing" or possibly "dry clearing")
- Hascombe (Hægtessecombe, meaning "valley of the witch")
- Hurling (Hurlingas, meaning "Hurl's people"
- Hurtmore (heorotmera, the second part means "hart (deer) lake")
- Hurthill ("deer hill")
- Hydestyle (unknown)
- Hydon ("high hill")
- Lascombe (the second part means "valley")
- Littleton ("small estate")
- Losley (Loselēah, the second part means "clearing")
- Loxhill
- Lydling ("little people")
- Milford ("the ford by the mill")
- Mousehill, Surrey (possibly literal, probably Middle English)
- Munstead (possibly "Mun's place")
- Northbourne ("north stream")
- Nurscombe (Notescombe meaning "Note's valley"
- Ockford (Hocford, "ford of the River Ock")
- Ockley (Occalēah, "Occa's clearing")
- Peper Harrow (Pīpereheōrge, "heathen temple of the Pipers")
- Polsted (the second part means "place")
- Prior's Field ("pasture of the Prior"
- Puttenham (originally Reddesolhæm, the second part means "farm", the first part may be a given name.)
- Rodborough, see also Rodborough School (unknown, but the second part refers to a burh which is a "fortified camp")
- Rodsall (derived from the same name as Puttanham, above, Reddesolhæm)
- Sandhills (possibly literal, probably Middle English)
- Shackleford (Sakelesford, possibly derived from scacol meaning "tongue of land crossing")
- Shackstead (Scuccastead, "evil spirit place")
- Tadmoor (unknown, but some high ground)
- Tilford "fertile river crossing"
- Tiltham "fertile farm"
- Thursley (Þunreslēah, "sacred clearing of Thunor"
- Thorncombe Street "wild valley"
- Truxford (unknown but a river crossing)
- Tuesley (Tīweslēah, "sacred clearing of Tyr"
- Unsted (see Munstead)
- Winkford (unknown but a river crossing, perhaps with a given name)
- Winkworth (the first part means "corner" or "nook", the second part means a "walled enclosure")
- Witley (Witlēah, "white clearing" perhaps due to Silver Birch trees)
- Wormley (Wormlēah, "clearing of snakes", perhaps due to many adders in the vicinity)
- Yagden Hill (unknown, but the second part "den" is derived from dun meaning "hill")
- Mills, Anthony David, A Dictionary of British Place-Names (2003), Oxford University Press

https://www.scribd.com/doc/49653561/3/Surrey http://www.localhistories.org/names.html
