= Peaslake =

Village in Surrey, England

Coordinates: 51°11′31″N 0°26′49″W

- Village
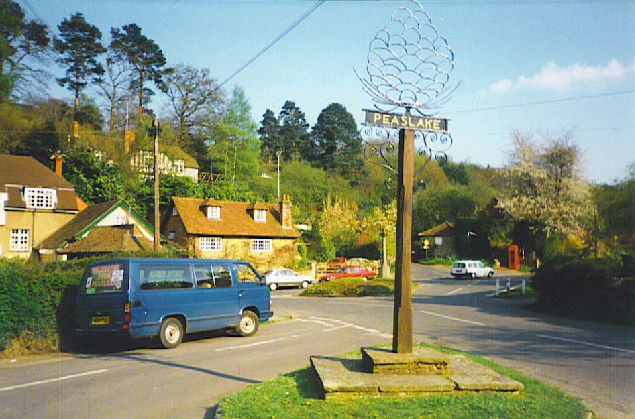
- Part of the village centre

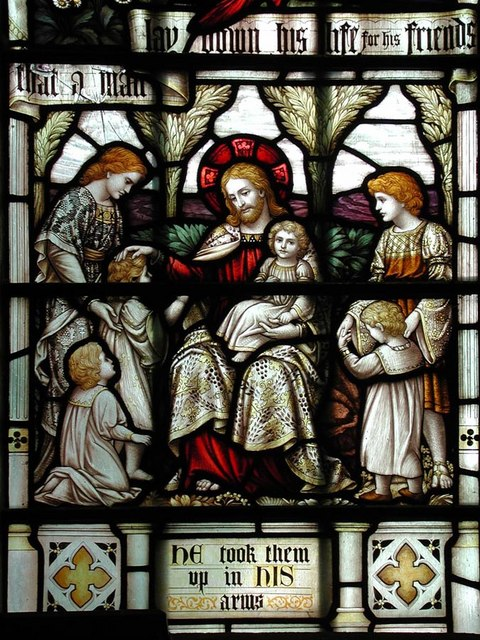
- St Mark's Church, Peaslake, detail.

- Location within Surrey
- Population: 878
- OS grid reference: TQ085447
- Civil parish: Shere
- District: Guildford
- Shire county: Surrey
- Region: South East
- Country: England
- Sovereign state: United Kingdom
- Post town: Guildford
- Postcode district: GU5
- Dialling code: 01306
- Police: Surrey
- Fire: Surrey
- Ambulance: South East Coast
- UK Parliament: Godalming and Ash

Peaslake, Hoe and Colman's Hill are in the centre of the Surrey Hills National Landscape and mid-west of the Greensand Ridge about 5 miles (8.0 km) ESE of Guildford. Surrounded by denser pine and other coniferous forest-clad hills, the three conjoined settlements have a small core in Peaslake itself with the amenities of a village, but are otherwise lightly scattered settlements at a higher elevation than the centre of Shere, the civil parish.

The area referred to by the 2011 census covers 302 hectares (750 acres). Friends of the Hurtwood maintains and coppices 3,000 acres (1,200 ha) of surrounding forest, the Hurtwood, which comprises: Holmbury Hill, Pitch Hill, Winterfold, Shere Heath, Farley Heath and part of Blackheath Common. It is in the civil parish of Shere.

== History ==
The earliest mention of Peaslake was in 1784, when Francis Haybitle, a farm labourer "of Peaslake", left (to the vestry) a rentcharge of 15s. a year on a cottage in Shere to provide bread for the poor.

Peaslake School was founded by George Cubitt (the 1st Lord Ashcombe), Mr. Justice Bray, the Misses Spottiswoode, and others in 1870. John Bartholomew mentions the place in his gazetteer of 1887 as a village in Shere parish, Surrey "4½ miles SE. of Guildford". In the last decade of the 19th century a road from Ewhurst, practicable for wheeled vehicles, was the first one brought into Peaslake as district councils were instituted. It was formerly accessible from the north, but was on the edge of the accessible country with no real road beyond. A Working Men's Institute that no longer exists was built in 1891 by the Misses Spottiswoode of Drydown, multiple benefactors to the neighbourhood. Most of the oldest extant houses were built in the brief Edwardian period (1901–1911).

The writer, Ralph Lawrence, recalls hearing the guns on the Western Front while walking in Hurtwood in the First World War.

== Geography ==
Peaslake is set in rolling meadows and forests in terms of topography, soil type and land use. Access to the village by car can only be gained by using roads which are at some point single track, which gives visitors the feel that it is more remote than it is, and which makes it quieter than the villages closer to the A25. The position, in one of the most uniformly forested parts of the Greensand Ridge, provides a variety of trees on varying terrain.

The scattered settlement with a core at Peaslake is between 110 and 210 m (360 and 690 ft) above sea level. All three adjoining small settlements are in the centre of the Surrey Hills and about 5 miles (8.0 km) from Guildford.

The Law Brook, a tributary of the Tillingbourne, has a source within the parish.

=== Hurtwood ===
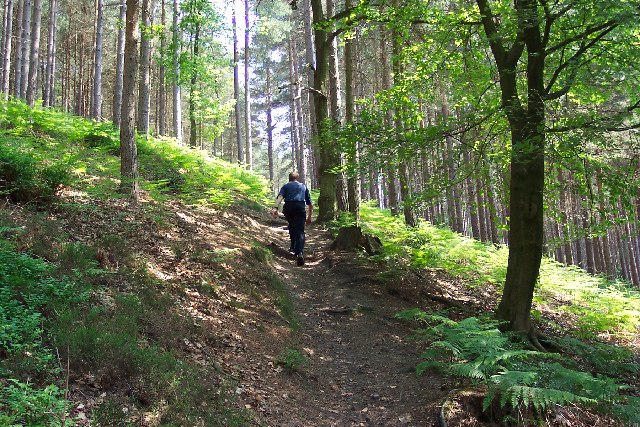
A typical path through the managed woodland, Hurtwood, narrower than the Greensand Way path through it

In total, with 3,000 acres (1,200 ha) of surrounding forest, the Hurtwood comprises: Holmbury Hill, Pitch Hill, Winterfold, Shere Heath, Farley Heath and part of Blackheath Common. It is largely common land and is maintained by the Friends of the Hurtwood. Three of the nine car parks within Hurtwood are closest to Peaslake.

Almost 1 mile (1.6 km) east of Pitch Hill, wholly within Shere parish bounds and slightly closer to Holmbury St Mary, is Holmbury Hill – this is a Bronze Age multivallate hill fort; its elevation is 261 m (856 ft) AOD. Further to the east is Wotton and Abinger Commons.

Its most notable features are just over the parish bounds which tends to allocate the watershed crest to Ewhurst (in Waverley as visible by a dark line in the top‑right map of this article). These are Pitch Hill (sometimes called "Coneyhurst Hill") which, at 257 metres (843 ft), is the fifth‑highest point in Surrey, an adjoining knoll along the same crest has the Ewhurst windmill, which is a somewhat rustic, inhabited listed example – its only other comparator in the South East is at Capel.

The Greensand Way runs from mid Kent to Hindhead, Surrey, on the border of Hampshire. It stays along the crest of the Downs and is accessed from Peaslake by a nearly straight road at a similar elevation, using a natural ravine formed by Cobbler's Brook which rises on the opposite side of the Duke of Kent School, close but within Ewhurst parish.

== Amenities ==
Amenities are a village hall, pub, a bike shop and a multi-purpose village shop that serves teas and hot snacks, and incorporates a post office.

=== Place of worship ===
St Mark's church, built in 1889, is in the centre of the village, opposite the village hall. It is in the same parish as St James in Shere and the Sunday morning services alternate between them.

=== School ===
The village school is unusual in that it is owned and run by residents and parents, who bought it after it was closed by the local education council in 1994. It is free to pupils (except those in the nursery classes) and raises all its own running costs (over £100,000 a year) without council or government support (aside from "early years" funding). It offers education for fifty children from age 3 to 7. The school was made a Free school in September 2013 It has a roll of 29 pupils.

=== Hotel ===
The Hurtwood Inn hotel was constructed in 1920 and was an early part of what became the Trust House Forte hotel group.

== Demography ==
In all 111 houses make up the main centre of the village of 346 in total.

The 2011 United Kingdom census considered the village as three relevant output layers, approximately a quarter of the ward Shere, the latter being used for elections to Guildford Borough Council. All parts featured their single largest proportion of housing as single family homes with gardens.

The proportion of households in the three divisions of Peaslake who owned their home outright was at least 13.3% above the borough average and 19.4% above the national average (in Colman's Hill, greater still in the other two). The proportion who owned their home with a loan was within 2% of the borough average except in Colman's Hill where it was 9.9% greater than the national average. This provides in each area for a lower proportion than average of rented residential property and of social housing relative to the Surrey and national averages; in Colman's Hill only 5% of housing was rented, or living rent-free from another.

2011 Census Key Statistics
Output area	Population	Households	% Owned outright	% Owned with a loan	hectares
E00155532 (Peaslake centre)	278	111	53.2	32.4.	131
E00155530 (Hoe)	283	115	47.0	36.5	46
E00155531 (Colman's Hill)	317	120	50.0	45.0	125

== Public transport ==
The village is served, weekdays only, by Compass Bus route 25 from Guildford to Cranleigh, taking about 40 minutes from the bus station. The nearest railway station is Gomshall on the North Downs Line, about 1 mi (1.6 km) north.

== Notable residents ==
- Dorothy Frances Buxton – co-founder of the Save the Children Fund.
- Vanessa Jackson – painter Royal Academy of Arts.
- Frederick Pethick-Lawrence, 1st Baron Pethick-Lawrence of Peaslake, former Labour minister, who was Secretary of State for India and Burma in the post-war Attlee government. Built a house in Peaslake called Fourways.
- Edna Mosley, architect who, with her husband, designed their house, Little Acre in Franksfield, Peaslake, in 1932.

== In literature ==
Peaslake is referenced in Colin Forbes' thriller "The Leader and the Damned", in an episode where a pair of lovers, trapped in the carnage of WWII Europe, dream of a happy future in post-war England:

- "I know a little village in Surrey, near Guildford. All huddled down in the folds of the hills..." - "Peaslake?" - "Oh, you know it, too!"

== Notes and references ==
References
