= Surrey Hills National Landscape =

National Landscape in Surrey, England

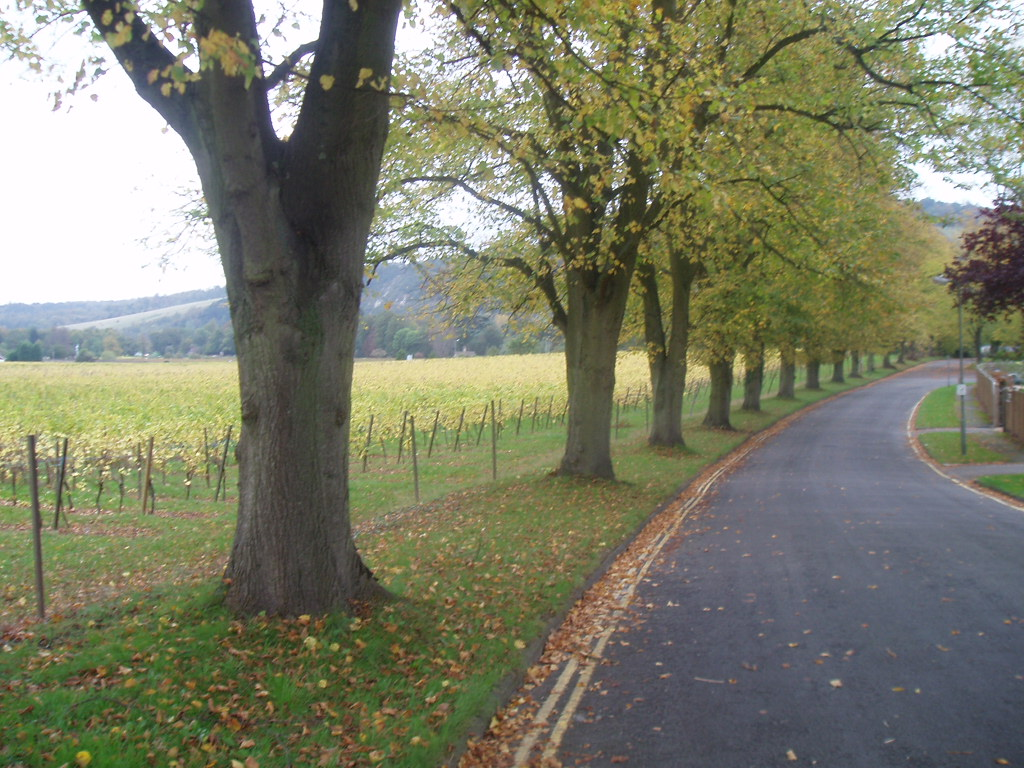
- Residential roads in Dorking, bordering vineyards on the side of the North Downs

- Location of the National Landscape in England
- Location: Surrey, England
- Coordinates: 51.2503°N 0.3243°W
- Area: 422 km^{2} (163 sq mi)
- Designated: May 1958
- Website: surreyhills.org

The Surrey Hills National Landscape is a 422 km^{2} (163 sq mi) National Landscape in Surrey, England. It comprises around one quarter of the land area of the county and principally covers parts of the North Downs and Greensand Ridge. It was designated as an Area of Outstanding Natural Beauty in May 1958 and was redesignated as a National Landscape in 2023. The Surrey Hills National Landscape borders the Kent Downs AONB to the east and the South Downs National Park to the south west.

== Geography ==
Peaks of the Surrey Hills AONB

The highest summit of the Surrey Hills National Landscape, Leith Hill near Coldharbour, is 294 metres (965 ft) above sea level. It is part of the Greensand Ridge, which traverses the National Landscape from west to east, and is the second highest point in south-east England (Walbury Hill at 297 metres or 974 feet above sea level is the highest).

Blackheath Common is also part of the area.

The northern ridge of the hills, predominantly formed by chalk, is separated from the southern ridges, which are predominantly greensand, by the Vale of Holmesdale, which continues into Kent. The North Downs provide a haven for rare plants and insects. Parts of the area are owned and managed by the National Trust, including Ranmore Common, Leith Hill and Box Hill.

=== Principal summits ===
The following hills within the National Landscape have at least 30 metres of topographic prominence:

Hill	Elevation	Prominence	Grid reference
Leith Hill	294 m (965 ft)	247 m	TQ139431
Gibbet Hill	272 m (892 ft)	128 m	SU899359
Holmbury Hill	261 m (856 ft)	107 m	TQ103429
Pitch Hill	257 m (843 ft)	85 m	TQ082423
The Warren	251 m (823 ft)	33 m	TQ076424
Winders Hill	236 m (774 ft)	47 m	TQ354540
Reigate Hill	234.7 m (770 ft)	100.1 m	TQ255520
Dunley Hill	227 m (745 ft)	110 m	TQ104490
Box Hill	224 m (735 ft)	53 m	TQ204517
Hascombe Hill	198.4 m (651 ft)	111 m	TQ010389
Breakneck Hill	189 m (620 ft)	62 m	SU997385
Hydon's Ball	181 m (594 ft)	48 m	SU977396
St Martha's Hill	175 m (574 ft)	58 m	TQ027483
Rutton Hill	167 m (548 ft)	37 m	SU909376
Crooksbury Hill	163 m (535 ft)	87 m	SU878459
Longmoor	161 m (528 ft)	51 m	TQ138477
Sandhills	155 m (509 ft)	51 m	SU939383
Hog's Back	153.9 m (505 ft)	56.3 m	SU950483
Yewtree Nob	139.6 m (458 ft)	31 m	TQ007412
The Terrace	136 m (446 ft)	30 m	TQ174489
Bury Hill	127 m (417 ft)	39 m	TQ155484
The Devil's Jumps	121 m (397 ft)	34 m	SU869395

The summit of Botley Hill (270 m) lies just outside the National Landscape.

== Other designations ==
Chiddingfold Forest, a Site of Special Scientific Interest (SSSI), lies within the area.

Surrey Hills National Landscape is surrounded by an Area of Great Landscape Value, which covers a further eight percent of the county.

== Walking ==
The Surrey Hills area has three long-distance walks running through it: the North Downs Way, the Greensand Way, and the Pilgrims' Way.
