= Holmbury Hill =

Woodland in Surrey, England

Coordinates: 51.1756°N 0.4213°W

Holmbury Hill is a wooded area of 261 metres (856 ft) above sea level in Surrey, England, and the site of an Iron Age-period hillfort. The Old Saxon word "holm" can be translated as hill and "bury" means fortified place. It sits along the undulating Greensand Ridge, its summit being 805 feet (245 m) from the elevated and tightly clustered small village of Holmbury St. Mary which was traditionally part of Shere, 8 kilometres (5.0 mi) away.

== Archaeology and history ==
Excavation of the hillfort in 1929 by classicist and amateur archeologist S. E. Winbolt indicated that it dated to the 1st Century AD and may have been constructed by Belgic tribes of Celts who were settling this part of Britain in the period prior to the Roman invasion of Britain. Later research, however, suggests that the fort was occupied earlier from 100 to 70 BC. The fort was defended by two layers of ramparts to the west and north with escarpments on the eastern and southern slopes. The outer ditches were originally about three metres deep and six metres wide. The inner ditches were considerably larger, some four metres deep and nine metres wide. These earthworks may have had a symbolic function in addition to a purely military one. The hard band of chert on which the hill fort sits gives it a prominence over the weald that may have served as an assertion of control and security over the trade routes through the area. There is no evidence to suggest long-term occupation of the fort but it would have offered a safe and obvious place to meet, trade and host communal activity.

== Geography ==
At 261 metres (856 ft) Holmbury Hill is the fourth highest point in the county. It is 3.2 kilometres (2.0 mi) west of Leith Hill, the highest point in Surrey at 294 metres (965 ft), separated by a deep ravine draining north and south. It is 21.5 kilometres (13.4 mi) north-east of Gibbet Hill, Hindhead, the second highest point in Surrey at 272 metres (892 ft). The third highest point in the county is Botley Hill (269.6 metres (885 ft)) 32 kilometres (20 mi) to the north east in Woldingham civil parish on the North Downs, one of the two main hill ridges in Surrey. All of the other six highest peaks are in the Greensand Ridge, which is separated by the Vale of Holmesdale from the North Downs.

The hills between Botley Hill and Gibbet Hill together comprise the Surrey Hills Area of Outstanding Natural Beauty.

In total 3,000 acres (12 km^{2}) of surrounding forest, the Hurtwood SSSI, is maintained by the Friends of the Hurtwood which comprises: Holmbury Hill, Pitch Hill, Winterfold, Shere Heath, Farley Heath and part of Blackheath Common. The villages of Peaslake and Ewhurst are close by.

The sedimentary sandstone bedrock of Holmbury Hill is part of the Hythe Beds, laid down in shallow seas approximately 113 to 126 million years ago in the Cretaceous Period. The sandstone mass overlays the weaker Atherfield Clay Formation, a sedimentary mudstone also laid down in the shallow seas of the Cretaceous. This combination is very prone to vertical landslip and gives rise to steep escarpments. The southern face of Holmbury Hill on which the fort is situated is made more imposing by the erosion resistant chert bands running through the Greensand.

The chert was particularly valued in the 18th and 19th century as a building stone locally and quarries are found around the site of the fort. Quarrying added significantly to the other principal economic activity taking place on the hill such as timber production, turf cutting and gathering bracken and heather.

== Views ==
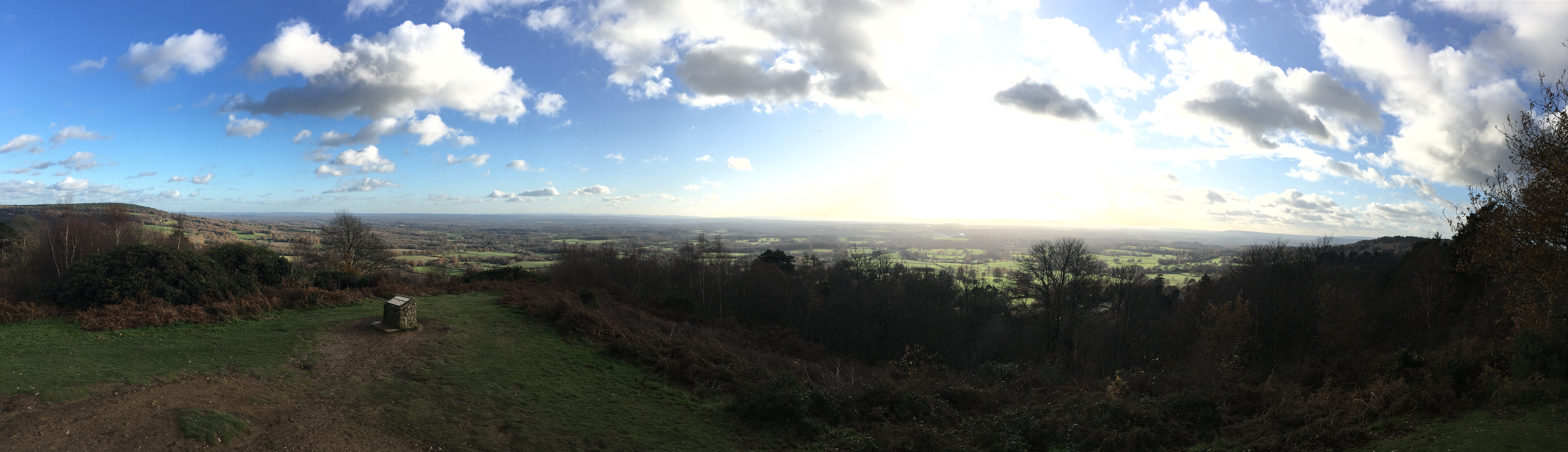
Panorama south from hill fort with Leith Hill on left and Gibbet Hill, Hindhead on horizon extreme right

== Sources ==
- Winbolt, SE (1930). "Excavations at Holmbury Camp" (PDF). Surrey Archaeological Collections. 38: 156–170. doi:10.5284/1068771.
- Dyer, James The Penguin Guide to Prehistoric England & Wales (1981), p. 237
