= St Dominic's School =

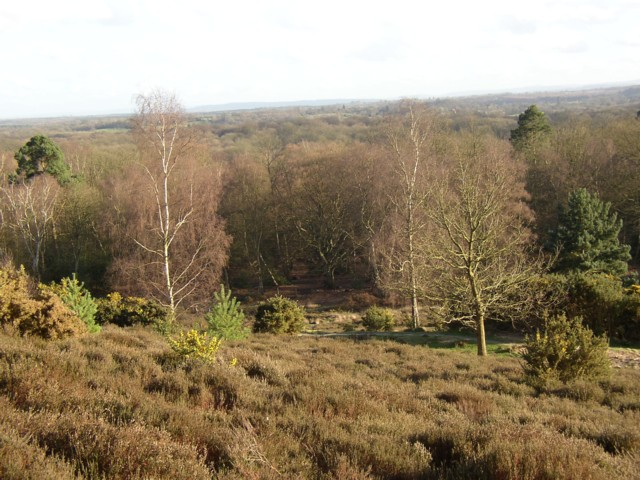
- Nearby Hambledon Hurst or Heath characterises the lightly populated area around the school

Location
- Hambledon; Godalming, Surrey, GU8 4DX; England; 51°08′13″N 0°37′37″W

Information
- Type: Special school; Academy
- Established: 1929
- Local authority: Surrey County Council
- Department for Education URN: 145384 Tables
- Ofsted: Reports
- Principal: Victoria Perry
- Age: 8 to 19
- Enrolment: 90~
- Houses: Sahara; Kilimanjaro; Serengeti; Victoria Falls
- Website: https://www.stdominicsschool.org.uk/

St. Dominic's School in Hambledon, Surrey, England is a co-educational day school, one of the oldest special schools in the United Kingdom. It specialises in the education of children with various disabilities, such as autism, whilst integrating specialised support, including an onsite speech and language, occupational and physio therapy team. Currently pupils are admitted from over 35 different LEAs. It admits and educates pupils aged 7–19.

Previously a non-maintained independent school, in January 2018 St Dominic's School formally entered the state sector and converted to academy status. The school is now part of the Orchard Hill College & Academy Trust.

== Admissions ==
Applications are normally made through the Local Education Authority in whose area a child's family live. Currently pupils are admitted from over 35 different LEAs.

== Background ==
On Mount Olivet, a hill in the Greensand Ridge, the place was named after St. Dominic Savio, the patron saint of juvenile delinquents. The site was originally property of Charles Watney. It consisted of an observatory and a chapel, the latter of which remains a prominent assembly place and the observatory remaining as the logo for the school. When Watney's wife died in 1929, some time after Watney himself died, the Roman Catholic congregation of nuns known as the Sisters of the Sacred Hearts of Jesus and Mary established the school at her request, and they remain its trustees to this day. The school is one of those supported by the Diocese of Arundel and Brighton (in the Roman Catholic church).
