= Hydon's Ball =

Hill near Hydestile, Surrey, England

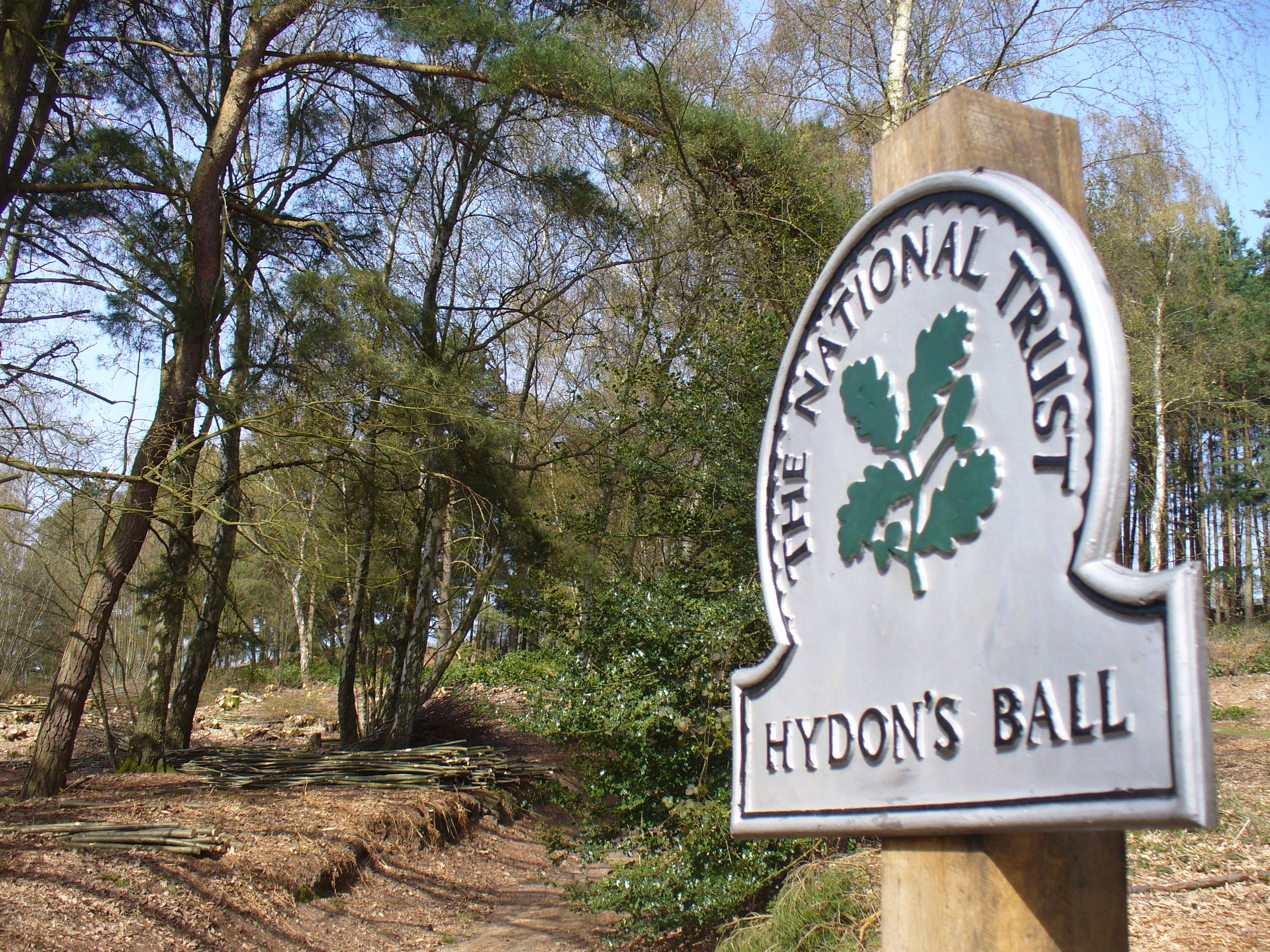
- National Trust signage at Hydon's Ball

Highest point
- Elevation: 179 m (587 ft)
- Coordinates: 51°08′47″N 0°36′17″W

Geography
- Location: Greensand Ridge, England
- OS grid: SU977395
- Topo map: OS Landranger 186

Hydon's Ball is a 179-metre-high (587 ft) hill covering most of Hydon Heath in Hydestile, Surrey, England.

== Description ==
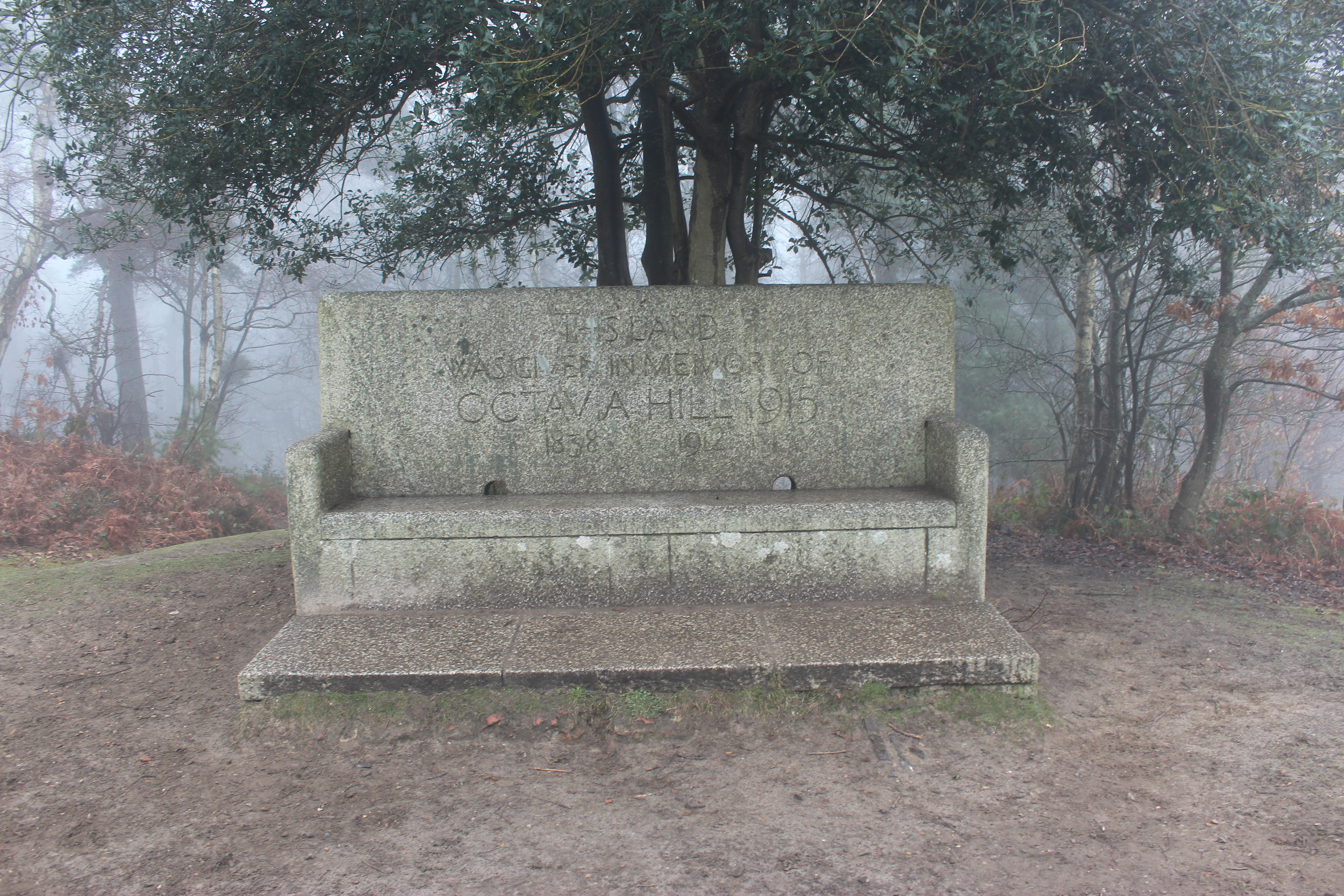
The memorial bench dedicated to Octavia Hill, on the summit of Hydon's Ball

The hill on Hydon Heath, Hydestile, reaches 179 metres (587 ft) and is almost a quarter of the way between Gibbet Hill, Hindhead (Note: Above the Devil's Punch Bowl) and Leith Hill in the Greensand Ridge.

Sometimes known as Hydon Ball or Cup Hill, the area is under the management of the National Trust. At its highest point is a large stone seat dedicated in 1915 to Octavia Hill, one of the Trust's founders.

It is believed that the term ball refers to a signalling station which once stood at the top of the hill. (Note: Typically, ball signalling stations were used to synchronize the time visually at given points during the day across long distances.) Its shape is similar to other hills named as 'ball'; there are more than six on Dartmoor e.g. Cuckoo Ball, grid reference SX 717902.

There is a short poem associated with Hydon's Ball, which may explain its other alternative name:

On Hydon's top there is a cup
And in that cup there is a drop
Pick up the cup, and drink the drop
And place the cup on Hydon's top.

Its slopes are planted with a range of tree species, including native oak, rowan, birch and pine. Two non-native shrubs, Amelanchier and Gaultheria, are said by oral history to have been planted there by landscape gardener Gertrude Jekyll, who lived approximately 3/4 mile (1.2 km) to the north at Munstead Wood, Busbridge.

Hydon's Ball is a meeting spot for local Morris Dancers who gather on the hilltop to welcome the first day of spring.

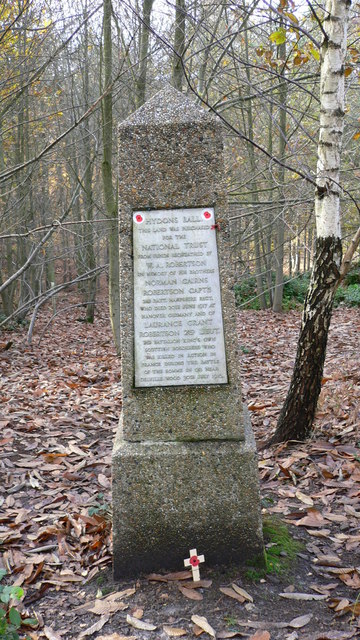
The Robertson War Memorial

The Grade II listed Robertson War Memorial lies slightly below the summit of Hydon's Ball. The eight-foot obelisk Commemorating the first world and features a plaque designed by Laurence Arthur Turner.

Hydon's Ball is one of the top ten highest points in Surrey. An underground drinking water reservoir is beneath the summit.

== Transport ==
Hydon's Ball is centred 2 1/2 miles (4.0 km) south of Godalming, which sits by the A3, in central southern England. The nearest village is to the south, Hambledon, which has a large public house (The Merry Harriers) and a village shop.

Around 1 1/4 miles (2.0 km) away, Milford railway station is nearest to the hill on the direct line between London Waterloo and Portsmouth Harbour.

Lying on the Greensand Way, the hill can be reached on it from the direction of Godalming/Dorking/Sevenoaks Wealds/Hamstreet and from that of the nearby western end of the ridge, Hindhead.

== Notes and references ==
Notes
