= Tilburstow Hill =

Coordinates: 51.234°N 0.069°W

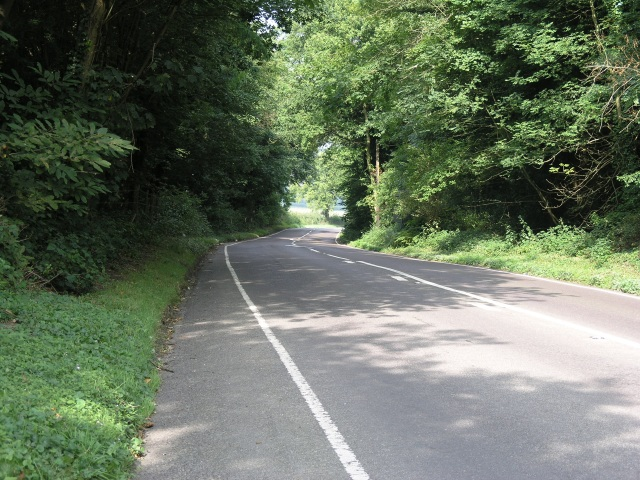
- Interactive map of Tilburstow Hill
- Type: Nature reserve
- Location: Godstone, Surrey
- OS grid: TQ349501
- Area: 9 hectares (22 acres)
- Manager: Surrey Wildlife Trust

Tilburstow Hill /ˌtɪlbʌstə ˈhɪl/ is a 9-hectare (22-acre) nature reserve south-east of Godstone in Surrey.

This is a semi-natural broadleaved wood on the Greensand Ridge, with sweet chestnut, sessile and pedunculate oak, beech, silver birch and hazel. Ground flora include dog's mercury and garlic mustard. There is access from Rabies Heath Road.
