= Netley Heath =

Coordinates: 51.234°N 0.441°W

Netley Heath is an area of woods and heathland in the parish of Shere close to Gomshall in Surrey, England. It is part of a larger geological stratum across parts of the South East, the "Netley Heath Beds". From 1795 to 1815 Netley Heath was the site of an Admiralty shutter telegraph station on the line from London to Portsmouth.

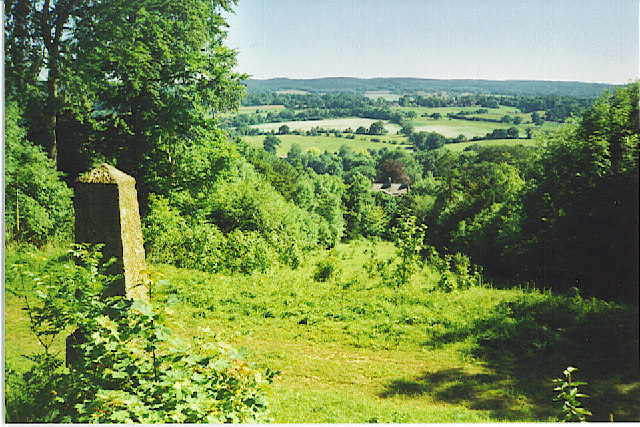
Netley Heath - looking down the Pilgrim's Way into a small fraction of the Vale of Holmesdale which is between the North Downs and Greensand Ridge from the far west of Surrey to the far east of Kent

== Land use ==
The woodland contains deciduous and coniferous trees — charcoal burning was carried out in the area from timbers with evidence of kilns for the charcoal product to be incinerated at high temperature.

== Geology and fossils ==
It is part of a larger geological stratum across parts of the South East, the "Netley Heath Beds". Fossils from the Red Crag (Lower Pleistocene) age have been found in deposits at Netley Heath. This is taken as evidence that marine deposits of the Plio-Pleistocene age were once deposited over the chalk.

Next station upwards	Admiralty Shutter telegraph line 1795	Next station downwards
Cabbage Hill	Netley Heath	Hascombe
