= Hydestile =

Hamlet in Surrey, England

Coordinates: 51°09′22″N 0°37′01″W

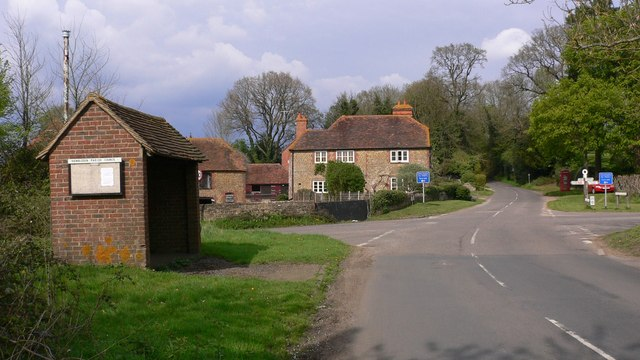
- The crossroads in Hydestile

- Location within Surrey
- Population: 431 - the population in 2011 was at most half of the two output areas drawn around portions of the two related areas.
- OS grid reference: SU96814056
- Civil parish: Munstead and Tuesley Hambledon
- District: Waverley
- Shire county: Surrey
- Region: South East
- Country: England
- Sovereign state: United Kingdom
- Post town: GODALMING
- Postcode district: GU8 4
- Dialling code: 01483
- Police: Surrey
- Fire: Surrey
- Ambulance: South East Coast
- UK Parliament: Godalming and Ash

Hydestile is a hamlet in Waverley, south-west Surrey. It is around 2 1/2 miles (4.0 km) south of Godalming between the villages of Busbridge and Hambledon, straddling the civil parish borders of Munstead and Tuesley and Hambledon. One landmark of the hamlet is Hydon's Ball, a large woodland and promontory of the Greensand Ridge, the site is within National Trust land and free to visitors.

== History ==
Hydestile was the site for two hospitals built on land that formed part of the Busbridge Hall Estate: from 1921 King George V Hospital (formerly a TB sanatorium) and from 1941 St Thomas' Hospital (formed from the World War II evacuation of St Thomas' Hospital in Lambeth). The hospitals were demolished and redeveloped in the late 1990s following years of disuse and dereliction. The only visible remains are the Gatehouse, the former Superintendent's house, six staff cottages and a cluster of footings amongst the woods.

== Geography ==
The hamlet is centred on the crossroads of Hambledon Road and Salt Lane. To the south-east is the steeper of two neighbouring outcrops of the Greensand Ridge. Elevations range from 74 metres (243 ft) in the narrow wooded vale of the Shad Well spring, that issues near the central crossroads of the hamlet and flows to the north, to 117 metres (384 ft) AOD less than a mile to the east.

To the west, the hamlets of Enton Green and Great Enton share one 2011 census output area (of between 50 and 150 homes), and their surrounding terrain is flatter; they are mentioned in the article on their civil parish, Hambledon.

== Landmarks ==
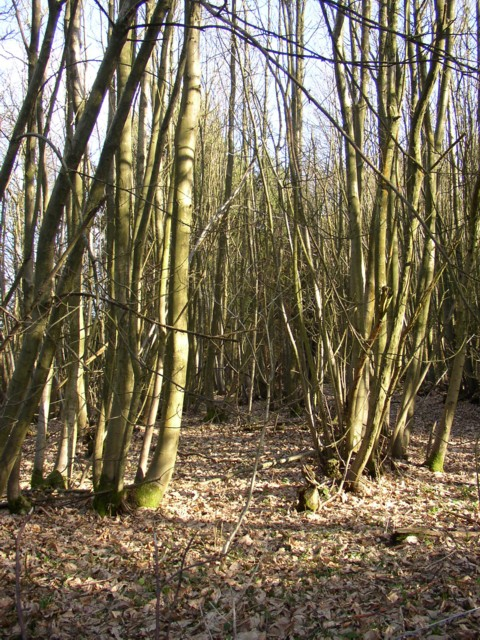
Coppiced trees in Hydon Heath

- Hydon's Ball (a steep, wooded hill) (NT)
- A Cheshire Home.
- The Tolt, Hydon Heath and Busbridge Woods are three woodlands that are on the periphery of the cluster of homes in the hamlet's centre.

== Demography ==
The settlement has a small population, split between two considerably larger United Kingdom Census 2011 output areas: E00157389 (north-east and beyond) and E00157740 (rest and beyond).

2011 Census Key Statistics
Output area	Population	Households	% Owned outright	% Owned with a loan
E00157389	528	171	50.3	36.3
E00157740	338	116	42.2	26.7
