= Hascombe =

Village and civil parish in Surrey, England

Coordinates: 51°09′02″N 0°34′18″W

- Village and civil parish
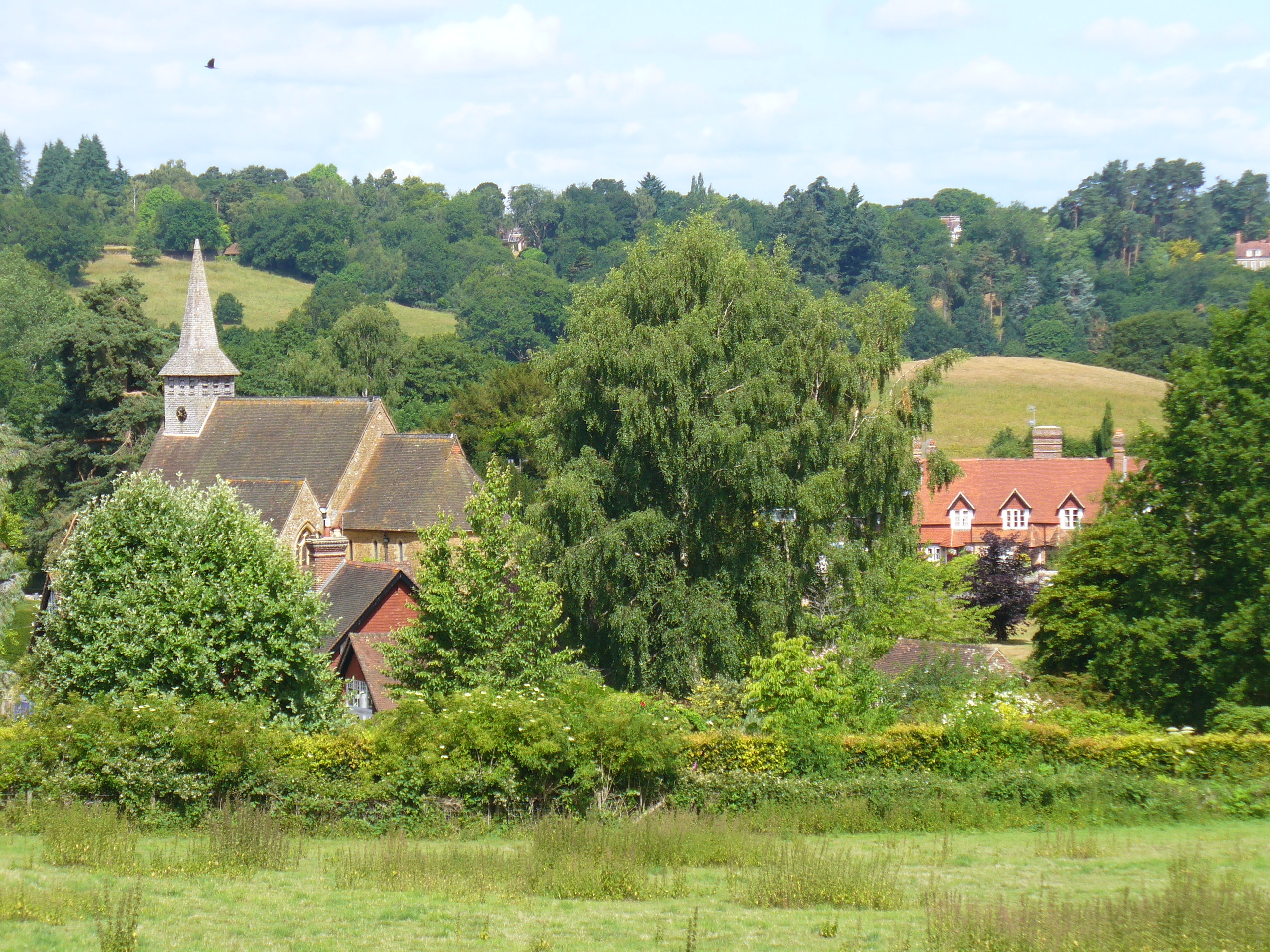
- Hascombe village, looking towards St Peter's Church and The White Horse public house

- Location within Surrey
- Population: 307 (2011 Census)
- OS grid reference: SU997397
- District: Waverley
- Shire county: Surrey
- Region: South East
- Country: England
- Sovereign state: United Kingdom
- Post town: Godalming
- Postcode district: GU8
- Dialling code: 01483
- Police: Surrey
- Fire: Surrey
- Ambulance: South East Coast
- UK Parliament: Godalming and Ash

Hascombe is a village and civil parish in Surrey, England. It is around 3 miles (4.8 km) southeast of Godalming in the Borough of Waverley. The settlement contains a large cluster of cottages and country estates, St Peter's Church, the village green, a fountain, pond, a central public house and is surrounded by steep wooded hillsides.

== Toponymy ==
The earliest records of the settlement are from 1241, in which it appears as Hasecumbe and under the modern spelling "Hascombe". Additional variants from the 13th century include Hescumbe (1243), Hascumbe (1255), Hassecumbe (1266) and Escumbe. (c. 1270). The second part of the name "‑combe", is generally agreed to derive from the Old English (OE) cumb, meaning a valley. The first element "Has‑" may come from hese or hæse (OE) meaning "brushwood", or from hægtesse (OE) meaning "witch".

== Geography ==
Hascombe's has a natural fresh-water spring that attracts many visitors: the fountain itself was commissioned in 1887 by local landowner Edward Lee Rowcliffe as a memorial to his late brother. The fountain is Grade II listed. The damming of a stream in the 15th century created the Church Pond.

=== Hills ===
A promontory that adjoins Hascombe Hill from 1796 to 1816 Hascombe hosted a station in the shutter telegraph chain which connected the Admiralty in London to the dockyard at Portsmouth.

Hascombe has the following summits in the Surrey Hills National Landscape:

Hill	Elevation	Rank within Surrey	Range
Hascombe Hill	197 m (646 ft)	14th	Greensand Ridge
Breakneck Hill	189 m (620 ft)	15th	Greensand Ridge
Hydon's Ball	181 m (594 ft)	16th	Greensand Ridge

== History ==
Above the village is Hascombe Hill, the site of an Iron Age multivallate hillfort. Pottery sherds recovered from the 2.5 ha (6.2-acre) site suggest that it was occupied between 200 and 50 BCE.

Hascombe is thought to have been part of the Manor of Bramley until the early 14th century.

It was during a stay at Hoe Farm in 1915 that statesman and future Prime Minister Sir Winston Churchill learned to paint.

== Demography ==
Hascombe is part of Bramley, Busbridge and Hascombe ward, which has a much higher than average home ownership than the South East Region and nation.

== Landmarks ==
The public house, The White Horse, a 16th- or 17th-century Grade II listed building with many later extensions, is constructed from the local Bargate stone, a local term for the hard masonry material which is a type of limestone with traces of greensand.

Hascombe Court is a large country estate with extensive gardens designed by Gertrude Jekyll.

In the southern part of the main street is a 3 ft (0.91 m) high, 15 ft (4.6 m) square animal pound: according to English Heritage, this is a 15th-century stone construction and is listed for its uniqueness in the county.

St Peter's Church is a Victorian Gothic Revival church built in 1864. It replaced an earlier 13th Century church that had become very dilapidated.

== Notable residents ==
Current and former residents include the film star Dirk Bogarde; Russian businessman Boris Berezovsky; former member of The Jam, Bruce Foxton; boss of McLaren Formula One racing team, Ron Dennis; broadcaster Chris Evans; and actor Billie Piper. The wildlife artist Archibald Thorburn lived and died in the village. His grave lies in the parish churchyard.

Next station upwards	Admiralty Shutter telegraph line 1795	Next station downwards
Netley Heath	Hascombe	Blackdown
