= Bruce Stocker =

Bruce Stocker FRS
- Born: Bruce Arnold Dunbar Stocker; 26 May 1917; Hambledon, Surrey, England
- Died: 30 August 2004 (aged 87); Palo Alto, California, USA
- Known for: Study of salmonella
- Spouse: Jane Beveridge (m. 1956; died 1996)
- Awards: Paul Ehrlich and Ludwig Darmstaedter Prize (1965)
- Scientific career
- Fields: Microbiology and immunology
- Relatives: Richmond Hursthouse (grandfather); Charles Hursthouse (great-uncle)

Bruce Arnold Dunbar Stocker FRS (26 May 1917 – 30 August 2004) was an English-born academic. He was Professor of Microbiology and Immunology at Stanford University from 1966 to 1987.

== Early life and family ==
Born in Hambledon, Surrey, England, on 26 May 1917, Stocker was the son of Eustace Dupuis Henchman Stocker and Ruth Mary Richmond Stocker (née Hursthouse). Eustace Stocker was a military officer who won the Military Cross in World War I, and was appointed an Officer and then Commander of the Order of the British Empire during World War II. Ruth Stocker was the daughter of Richmond Hursthouse, a Member of Parliament and cabinet minister in New Zealand. In 1956, Bruce Stocker married Jane Beveridge in Chelsea, London, and the couple went on to have two daughters.

== Education and scientific career ==
Stocker was educated at King's College London and Westminster Hospital Medical School. He was Guinness Professor of Microbiology at the University of London until 1965.

In 1966 Stocker was elected a Fellow of the Royal Society. He died in Palo Alto, California, on 30 August 2004.
