= Brook, Surrey =

Hamlet in Surrey, England

Coordinates: 51.135070°N 0.672054°W

Brook
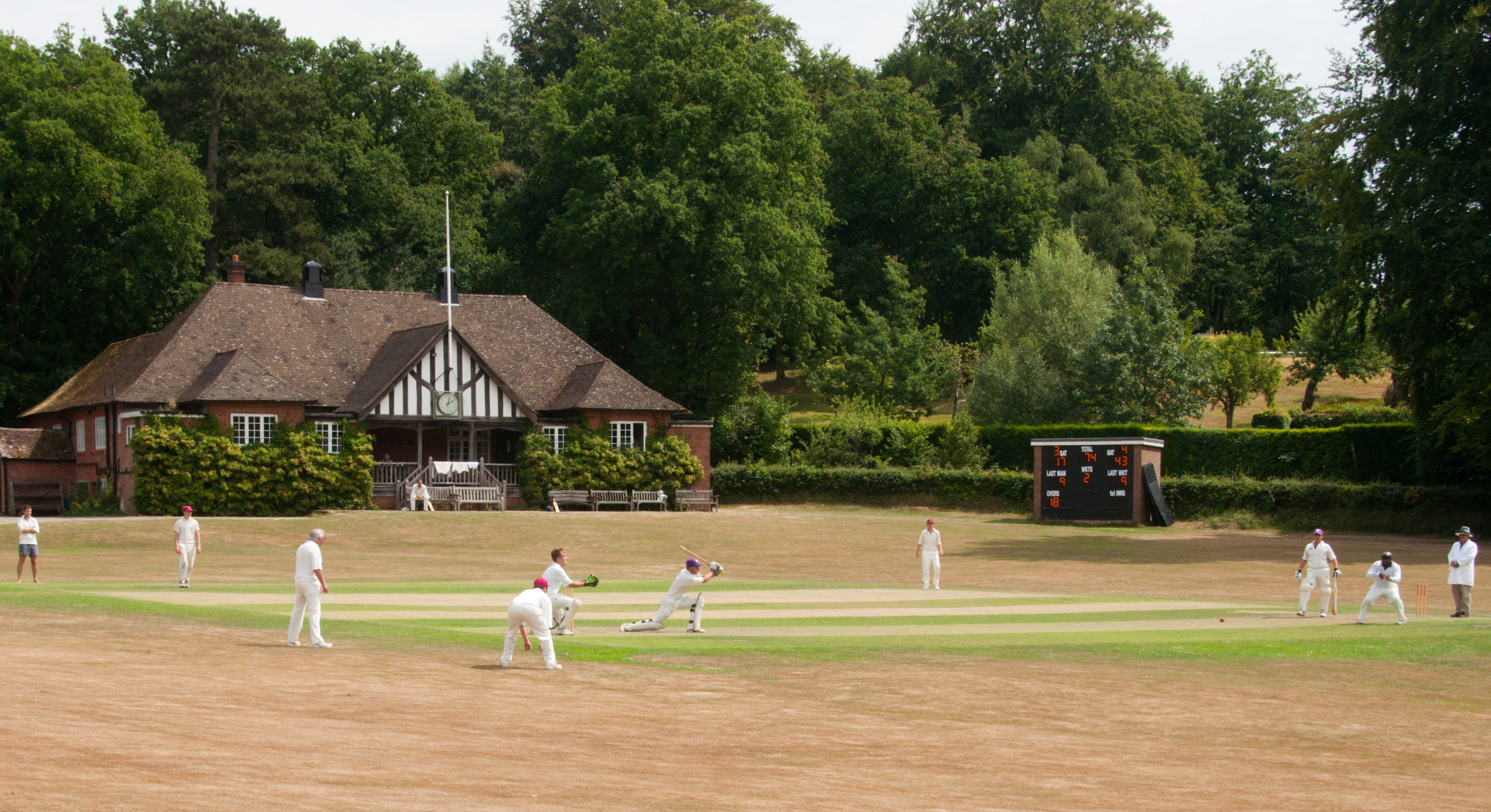
- A cricket match in front of Pirrie Hall

- Location within Surrey
- OS grid reference: SU9300838149
- Civil parish: Witley and Milford
- District: Waverley
- Shire county: Surrey
- Region: South East
- Country: England
- Sovereign state: United Kingdom
- Post town: Godalming
- Postcode district: GU5
- Dialling code: 01483
- Police: Surrey
- Fire: Surrey
- Ambulance: South East Coast
- UK Parliament: Godalming and Ash

Brook is a hamlet in the civil parish of Witley and Milford, in the Waverley district, in south-west Surrey, England. It is 1.2 miles (2 km) west of Wormley, beyond Sandhills with which it avoids being contiguous due to a narrow, partly woodland buffer. Brook straddles the A286 single carriageway road between Milford and Haslemere.

On slightly lower slopes of the Greensand Ridge than to the south, Brook is almost wholly within the Surrey Hills area of outstanding natural beauty.

== Amenities ==
Pirrie Hall, a community hall, dates from May 1923. It was built and donated by Lord Pirrie K.P. "for the use and benefit of the inhabitants of the hamlets of Brook, Sandhills and adjoining district". The maintenance of the hall is financed in part by a community association-organised annual May Bank Holiday Fete.

The hamlet's pub is the Dog and Pheasant.

=== Cricket club ===
Brook Cricket Club's ground adjoins Pirrie Hall. After leaving the Surrey Championship Cricket league in 2012, the club re-structured over the winter of 2012–13 and re-entered league cricket in the I'Anson Cricket league and formed a youth section. By 2018 the club's first eleven were in I'Anson Division 1 but were promptly relegated for 2019.

Brook was the origin of the Woodworm cricket bat used by Andrew Flintoff and Kevin Pietersen in the 2005 Ashes winning series. The club is among multiple claimants to have hosted the first person to bowl overarm.

== Notable people ==
Brook was home to Emily Williamson, co-founder of the RSPB, from 1912 to 1931, as well as Asif Zardari, and his wife the former Pakistan Premier Benazir Bhutto, who bought the Rockwood Estate in 1995. Husband and wife singers Philip Langridge and Ann Murray lived in Brook.
