= Toys Hill =

Hamlet in Kent, England

Coordinates: 51.242°N 0.104°E

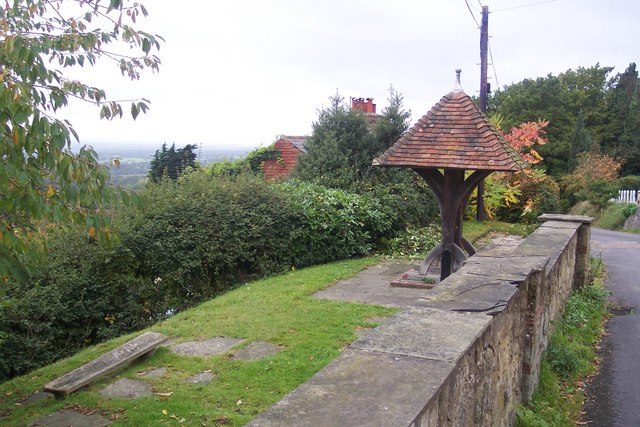
- Viewpoint on Puddledock Lane

- Location within Kent
- OS grid reference: TQ470513
- Civil parish: Brasted
- District: Sevenoaks
- Shire county: Kent
- Region: South East
- Country: England
- Sovereign state: United Kingdom
- Post town: Westerham
- Postcode district: TN16
- Police: Kent
- Fire: Kent
- Ambulance: South East Coast
- UK Parliament: Sevenoaks

Toys Hill or Toy's Hill is a hamlet in Brasted civil parish in the Sevenoaks district of Kent, England. It lies to the south of Brasted Chart, also in the parish.

The hamlet is on the steep scarp slope of the Greensand Ridge, a prominent escarpment principally formed of Lower Greensand sandstone. The escarpment here presents itself as a high, thickly wooded ridge running from west to east. It lies south of the North Downs, separated from the latter by the Vale of Holmesdale, and immediately north of the Weald of Kent, from which it is visible from many miles away, for example from Ashdown Forest in the High Weald. The summit of Toy's Hill, from which the hamlet takes its name, is 235 metres (771 ft) above mean sea level.

Within the hamlet there are outstanding views of the Weald from a terrace, which also includes a sunken well, on Puddledock Lane. The terrace was donated in 1898 by Octavia Hill, one of the founders of the National Trust, who lived at nearby Crockham Hill, and it was one of the National Trust's first properties.

The National Trust has since acquired considerably more land at Toys Hill through donations, culminating in 1981 with the acquisition of extensive woodlands through a special appeal, the final acquisition being called the Octavia Hill Woodland. The National Trust's Toys Hill estate now runs to more than 200 acres (81 ha) of woodland.

The area has been designated a Site of Special Scientific Interest because of its abundant wildlife, and much of it is recognised as a Grade I site of national importance for nature conservation.

== History ==
Toys Hill probably took its name in the Middle Ages from a local land-owning family. In 1295, Robert Toys paid 12d to the Manor of Otford for the right to keep pigs in Otford Woods, and it is likely that he or his family gave their name to this area of Brasted Chart.

Toys Hill was part of the Common of Brasted Chart, where local people once kept pigs and cattle, gathered peat and firewood and quarried Chertstone for their roads and buildings. Various pits that are visible in the high woods of Toys Hill include those dug by charcoal burners as well as pits for quarrying chert, a hard sandstone found in the Lower Greensand formation that has been extracted for many centuries for local roadstone and building stone.

The dense woodlands that crown Toys Hill and the surrounding plateau were badly affected by the Great Storm of 1987. Toys Hill used to be well known for its groves of ancient beech pollards, dating back to the early days of grazing, but only a few survived the 1987 storm. The woods have since regenerated with sessile oak, beech and birch saplings. Parts of one woodland, Scords Wood, are managed on a non-intervention "hands off" basis, so that natural development after the storm can be studied by Natural England.

The full title of Jonathan Evans, the former head of MI5, is Baron Evans of Weardale, of Toys Hill in the County of Kent.
