= Puttenham and Crooksbury Commons =

UK site of special scientific and archaeological importance

Coordinates: 51.207°N 0.697°W

- Site of Special Scientific Interest
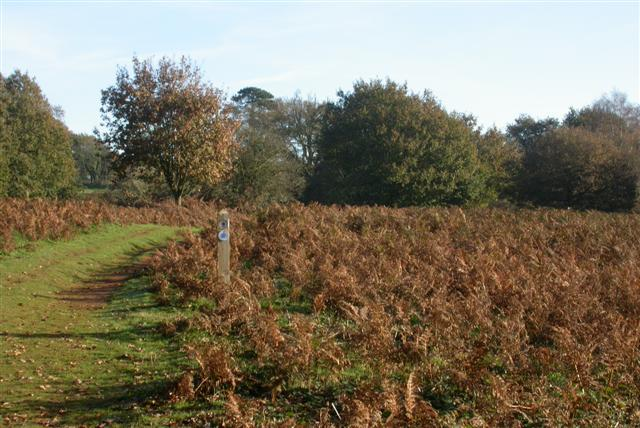
- Puttenham Common
- Location of Puttenham and Crooksbury Commons.
- Area of search: Surrey
- Grid reference: SU 911 461
- Interest: Biological
- Area: 113.8 hectares (281 acres)
- Notification date: 1986
- Location map: Magic Map

Puttenham and Crooksbury Commons is a 113.8-hectare (281-acre) biological Site of Special Scientific Interest between Farnham and Guildford in Surrey. Puttenham Common is owned by the Hampton Estate and managed on behalf of Surrey County Council. Hillbury Hillfort on Puttenham Common is a scheduled monument. It is a univallate hillfort which probably dates to the Iron Age.

== Crooksbury Common ==
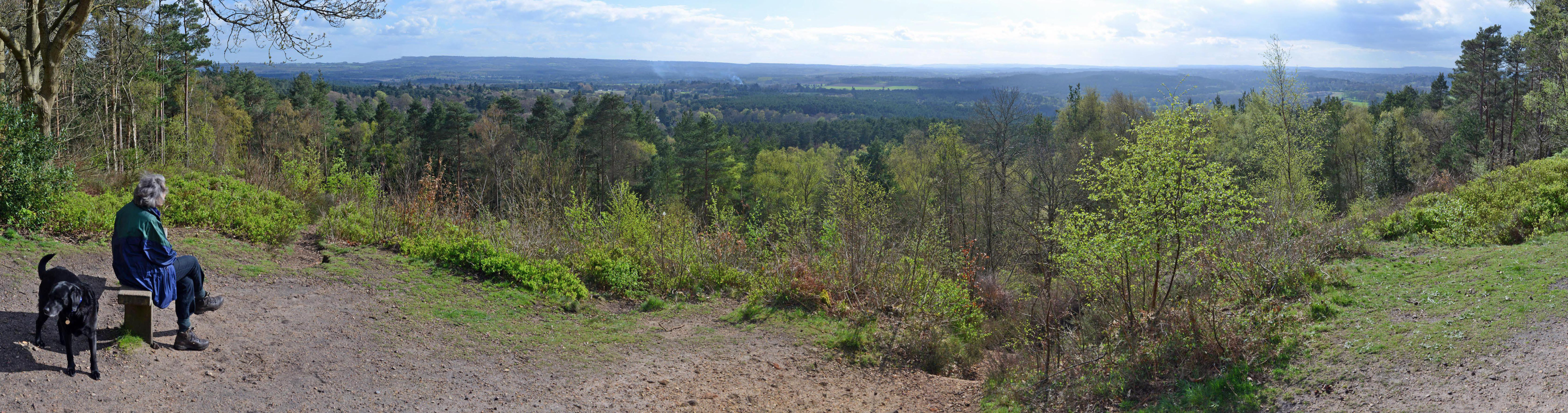
Looking at the only sector of the potential view available in 2014, which is otherwise obscured by trees. Centred looking to the west of Hindhead from the view-table SU 8787 4595.

Crooksbury hill at 162 metres (531 ft), is the highest point on Crooksbury Common. It is the 21st highest hill in Surrey. Atop the hill lies a triangulation point with views over the valley towards Hindhead and Gibbet Hill. It was mentioned in a Sherlock Holmes short story, "The Adventure of the Solitary Cyclist", in which Holmes is called upon to solve a singularly interesting case involving Miss Violet Smith.

The name Crooksbury is of Celtic origin. The fragments 'cruc' or 'crug' refer to burial mounds usually on a hill-top, which may pertain to fact there are earthworks on the flank of Crooksbury hill one of which is called Soldier's Ring.

== Puttenham Common ==
Puttenham Common is of archaeological interest. There is a hill fort at Hillbury which is a scheduled monument, probably dating back to the Iron Age. The site can be found on the highest point of the hill above Cutmill pond.
