= Oakhurst Cottage =

Grade II listed building located in Hambledon, Surrey, England

Coordinates: 51.1329°N 0.6239°W

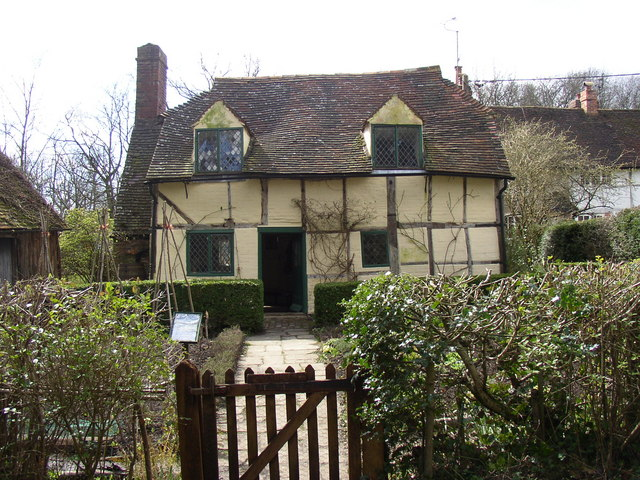
Oakhurst Cottage

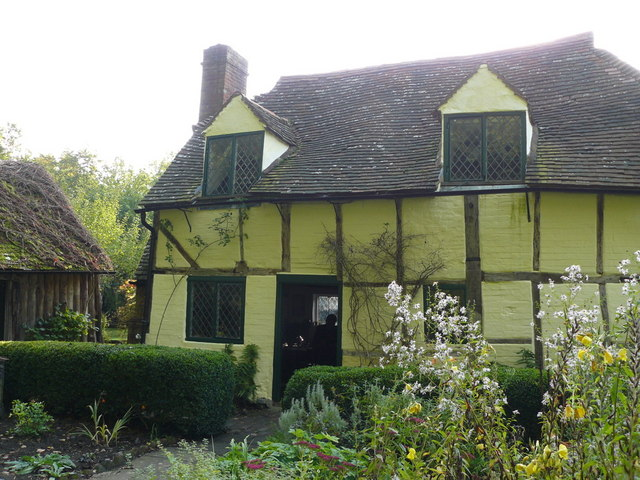
Oakhurst Cottage

Oakhurst Cottage is a tiny 16th or 17th-century cottage in Hambledon, Surrey, in the United Kingdom. It is a Grade II listed building.

The cottage was given to the National Trust in 1954, and occupied until 1983. It has been restored to illustrate the dwelling of a labourer in the Victorian era.

== History ==
The building may have originally been a barn. The cottage as it exists now was built in the 16th or 17th century. It was occupied until the 1980s, and has since been restored and furnished to illustrate an example of a labourer's cottage.

The cottage was given to the National Trust in 1954 by the Allfrey sisters but was lived in by their tenants Elsie and Ted Jeffrey until Ted's death in 1983. Its garden is filled with plants that were popular during the Victorian era. Such is its size that Oakhurst Cottage can only be viewed by appointment, and by groups of no more than six people at a time.

== Architecture ==
The two-storey building has a timber frame and a tiled roof. The infill between the timbers is colourwashed brick. There is a chimney to one side and a wing at the back. In the quarry-tiled kitchen is a large brick hearth beneath an oak beam, with examples of china and household implements which may have been used in a similar house. The bedrooms are accessed by a narrow staircase into the attic. These have two gabled dormer windows with some old glass in diamond-pane leading.

In the garden is an outhouse which housed the toilet, and a small barn with a collection of garden and workmen's tools.
