= Hambledon, Surrey =

Village and parish in Surrey, England

Coordinates: 51.138°N 0.619°W

Hambledon
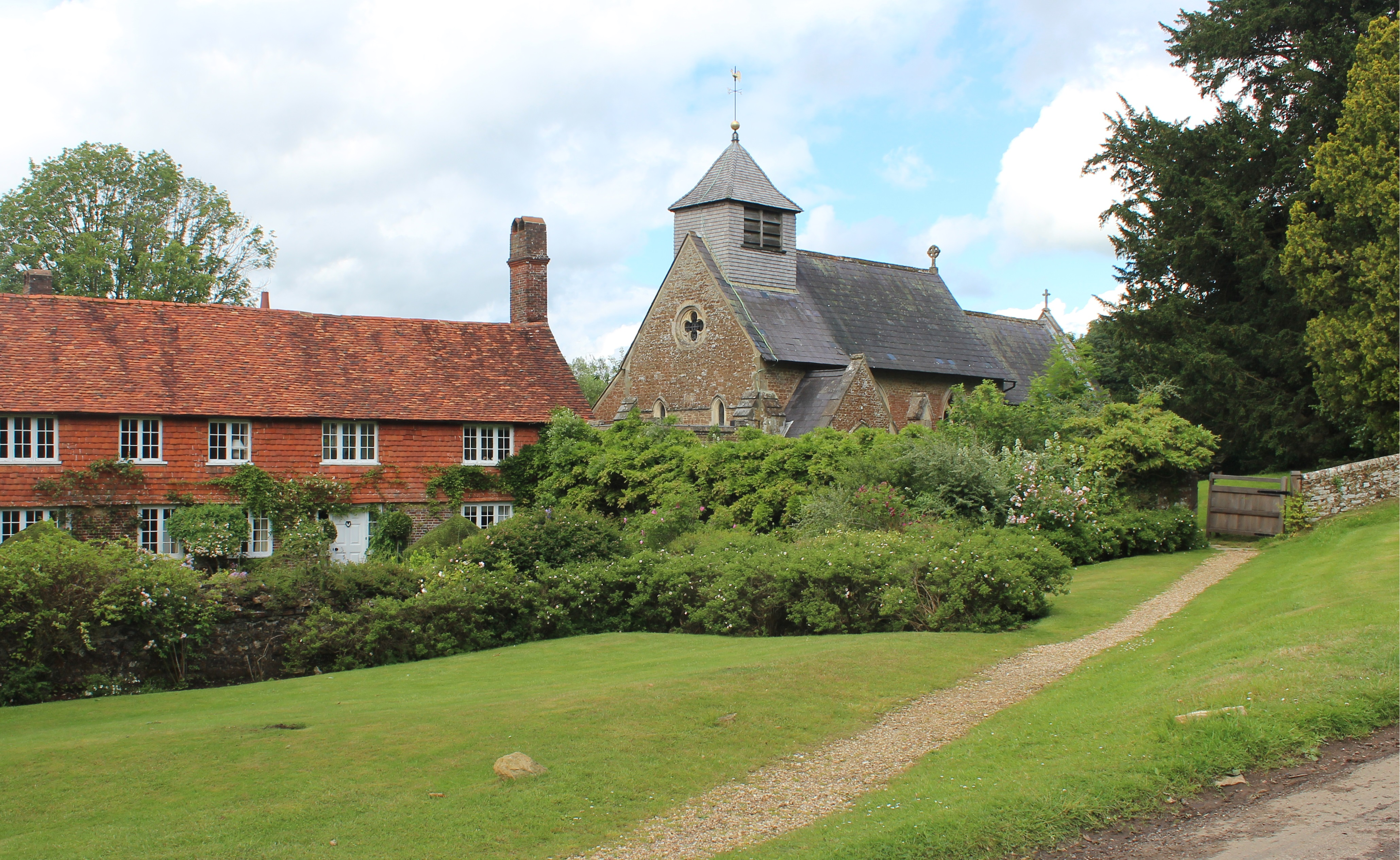
- Church built in the Middle Ages, and adjoining house

- Location within Surrey
- Area: 11.11 km^{2} (4.29 sq mi)
- Population: 805 (Civil Parish 2011)
  - Density: 72/km^{2} (190/sq mi)
- OS grid reference: SU9738
- Civil parish: Hambledon
- District: Waverley
- Shire county: Surrey
- Region: South East
- Country: England
- Sovereign state: United Kingdom
- Post town: Godalming
- Postcode district: GU8
- Dialling code: 01428
- Police: Surrey
- Fire: Surrey
- Ambulance: South East Coast
- UK Parliament: Godalming and Ash

Hambledon is a rural scattered village and civil parish in the Waverley borough of Surrey, situated south of Guildford. It is dominated by a buffer zone of fields and woodland, mostly south of the Greensand Ridge escarpment between Witley and Chiddingfold, having no dual carriageways or railways; however, it is bordered to the west by the Portsmouth Direct Line, and many of its small population are London commuters or retirees. Its main amenities are a church, a village pub, and the village shop and post office.

== History and description ==
Hambledon appears in Domesday Book of 1086 as Hameledune held overall by Rannulf from Edward de Sarisber (Salisbury). Its Domesday assets were: 3 hides of land; 7 ploughlands, 1 mill worth 2s 6d, 3 acres (0.012 km^{2}) of meadow, woodland worth 30 hogs. It rendered £5 per year to its feudal overlords.

In the 16th century, part of its land was mined for iron ore. This became replaced by the 18th and 19th centuries by brickmaking.

A local traditional legend claims there is buried treasure at Tolt Hill, near Hambledon, but no one has searched for it because it belongs to the Devil.

== Landmarks ==
- The parish church is Hambledon Church. Its traditional dedication is to St Peter. Built on top of a hill on Church Lane, its churchyard contains two gigantic yew trees – one with a 30-foot (9.1 m) circumference and hollow, with space for four people inside. The trees outdate the present church by many centuries. Each Sunday there are two services the earlier with a traditional theme and the later being contemporary. Today's building was constructed in the 19th century, although it does contain traces of its 14th century predecessor. Hambledon Church now forms a joint benefice with Busbridge Church.
- St Dominic's School is atop Mount Olivet, a hill.
- Oakhurst Cottage – a traditional 16th century timber-framed labourer's home, which has been restored and is now owned by the National Trust.
- Merry Harriers pub
- Hambledon Village Shop & Post Office – a community owned and run grocery shop, cafe and Post Office.

== Former landmark ==
=== Workhouse ===
Hambledon workhouse established under the Poor Laws was used by King Edward's School, Witley in nearby Wormley from 1940 to 1949 while the school buildings were taken over by the Royal Navy. It was managed by the Hambledon Poor Law Union, formed in 1836. An infirmary block and a mortuary were built to the north of the site in the 1870s, and these buildings later became Hambledon Hospital, which closed in 1948.

The buildings were used by Surrey County Council as an old peoples home until the early 1970s.

The buildings were then used by the Institute of Oceanographic Sciences until the 1990s when the site was acquired by property developers Berkeley Homes and redeveloped for residential use. Its workhouse survives converted into apartments.

To the north at Hydestile, within Hambledon's boundary, is the site of two former hospitals, King George V Hospital and St. Thomas' Hospital. This 50-acre (0.20 km^{2}) site has now been redeveloped.

== Geography ==
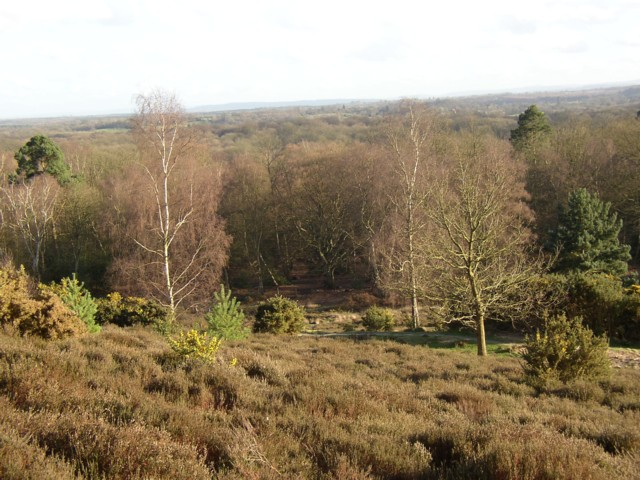
Hambledon Heath or Hurst

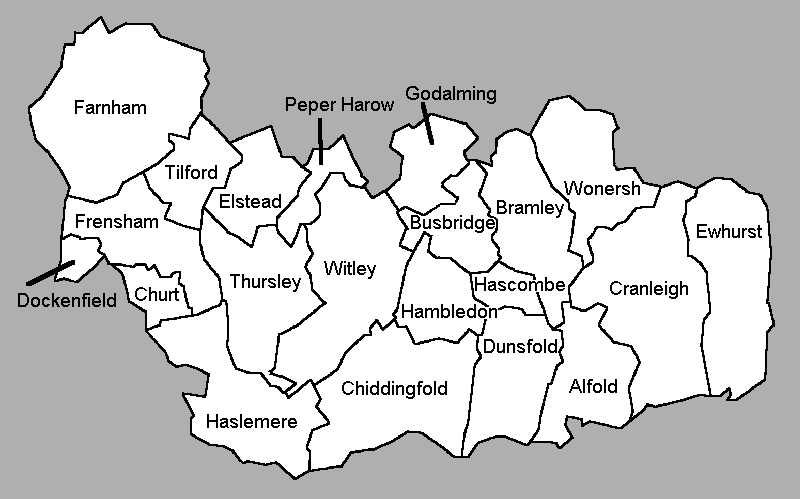
Hambledon civil parish in the Waverley borough

The village is 7.5 miles (12.1 km) SSW of the county town of Surrey, Guildford, and 3.3 miles (5.3 km) south of Godalming, which is the administrative centre of the borough of Waverley. In the centre of the civil parish are the greatest number of buildings, mostly linear. Hambledon is centred on a high watershed between the English Channel and North Sea. Two watercourses ultimately drain the village, neither in the parish, the River Wey and the River Arun, the former having a small stream, the West Brook of Godalming, which rises here.

In Hambledon's northern part (and south of it) are uplands of the Greensand Ridge, which can be explored using roads (in places) or the long-distance path, the Greensand Way.

== Demography and housing ==
2011 Census Homes
Output area	Detached	Semi-detached	Terraced	Flats and apartments	Caravans/temporary/mobile homes	shared between households
(Civil Parish)	171	89	17	31	2	0

The average level of accommodation in the region composed of detached houses was 28%, the average that was apartments was 22.6%.

2011 Census Key Statistics
Output area	Population	Households	% Owned outright	% Owned with a loan	hectares
(Civil Parish)	805	310	43.2%	30.0%	1,111

The proportion of households in the civil parish who owned their home outright compares to the regional average of 35.1%. The proportion who owned their home with a loan compares to the regional average of 32.5%. The remaining % is made up of rented dwellings (plus a negligible % of households living rent-free).

== Notable residents ==
- Martin Caroe, architect
- W. D. Caroe, architect
- Winton Dean, Handel Prize-winning musicologist
- Sir John Fletcher, 1st Baronet, MP for Hampstead
- Robin Harrison, Warden of Merton College, Oxford
- Evelyn Hellicar, architect
- Damon Hill, Formula One World Champion
- Sir Jeremy Hunt, MP for Godalming and Ash
- Bruce Stocker, Professor of Microbiology and Immunology at Stanford University
- Christopher Trace, Blue Peter presenter
- Ronald McKinnon Wood, Chairman of London County Council

== Derivations ==
In Sydney, a cottage was built by John Macarthur for Penelope Lucas, the governess to his children. She named it Hambledon Cottage after Hambledon, Surrey.
