= Greensand Way =

Long-distance path in England

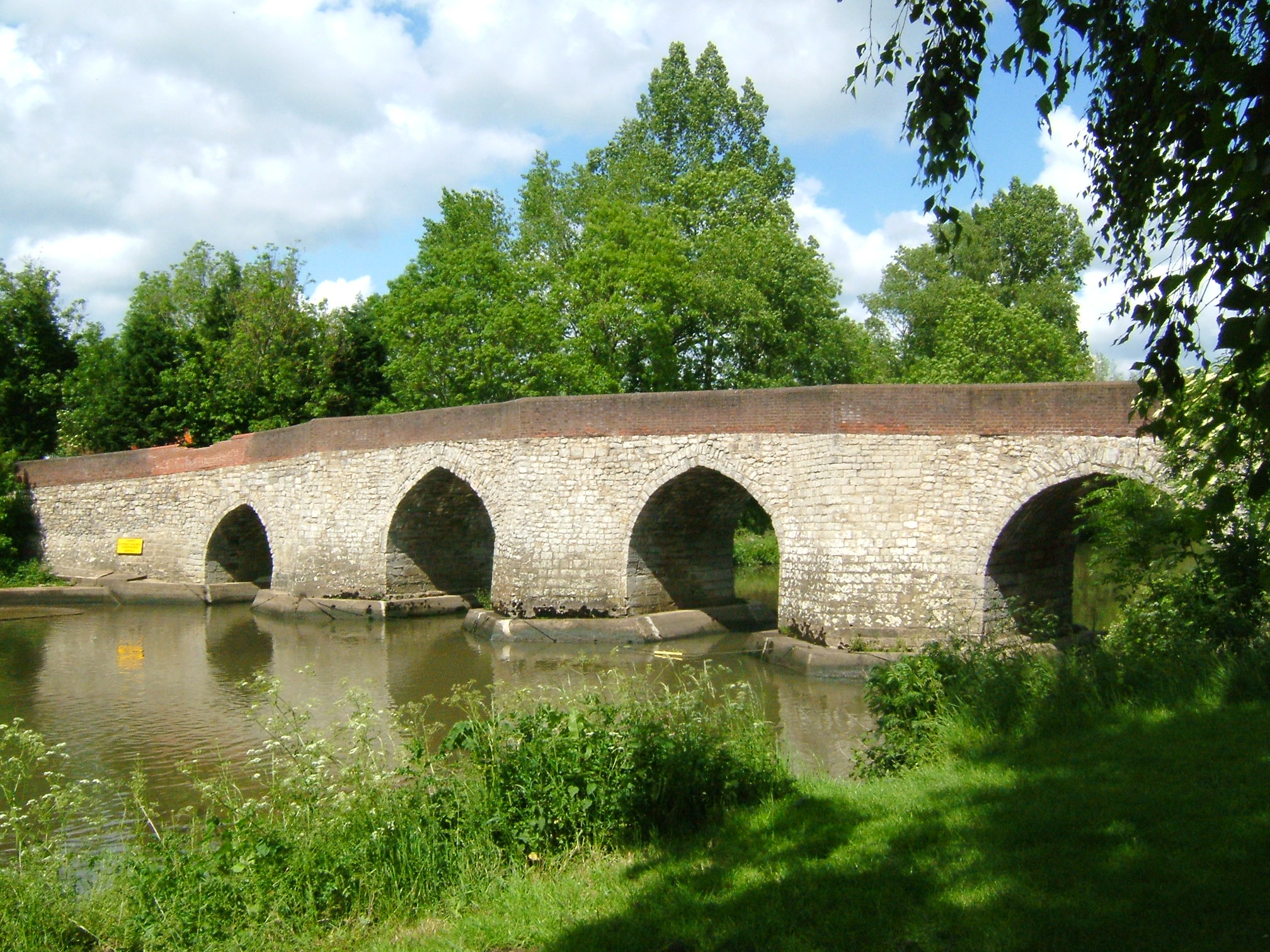
- Crossing the Medway – The Twyford Bridge, Yalding, Kent
- Length: 174 km (108 mi)
- Location: South Eastern England, United Kingdom
- Trailheads: Haslemere, Surrey; Hamstreet, Kent
- Use: Hiking
- Highest point: Leith Hill, 294 m (965 ft)
- Season: All year

The Greensand Way is a long-distance path of 108 miles (174 km) in southeast England, from Haslemere in Surrey to Hamstreet in Kent. It follows the Greensand Ridge along the Surrey Hills and Chart Hills. The route is mostly rural, passing through woods, and alongside fruit orchards and hop farms in Kent and links with the Stour Valley Walk near Pluckley in Kent. The trail was opened on 15 June 1980 and is jointly managed by Surrey and Kent Councils who fully updated it in 2012 (route, waymarking, online guide).

Much of the land is designated an Area of Outstanding Natural Beauty (AONB). The stretch from Hindhead to Leith Hill has formed part of the Surrey Hills AONB since 1958. The Sevenoaks Ridge, from the Surrey–Kent border to Borough Green, is included in the Kent Downs AONB.

The waymarks alone are not sufficient to follow the trail – an OS map, or the online guide with maps, is required. An updated guide with maps and walk directions is available online from the Kent and Surrey Council websites. The original guidebook is out of print. On Ordnance Survey Explorer map 145, a spur – also labelled Greensand Way – is shown from Thursley to Farnham; this is not part of the path.

== Places en route ==
Places on the trail include: Hindhead, Thursley, Wormley, Hambledon, Hascombe, Shamley Green, Holmbury St Mary, Wotton, Westcott, Dorking, Brockham, Betchworth, Reigate, Earlswood, South Nutfield, Bletchingley, Godstone, Tandridge, Broadham Green, Limpsfield, Crockham Hill, Toys Hill, Ide Hill, Sevenoaks Weald, Knole Park, Shipbourne, Dunk's Green, West Peckham, Nettlestead Green, Yalding, Linton, Sutton Valence, Egerton, Pluckley, Little Chart, Hothfield, Kingsnorth and finally Hamstreet.

== History ==
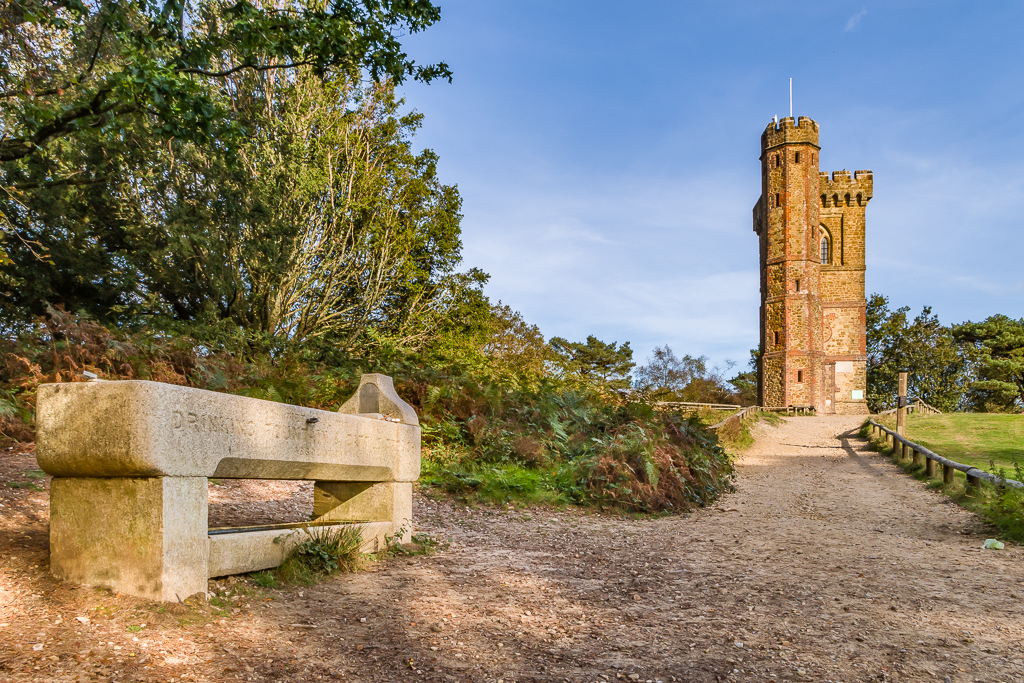
The Greensand Way approaching Leith Hill Tower from the west

A proposal for a long-distance footpath called the Greensand Way was put forward in the Greater London Plan, compiled by Patrick Abercrombie and published in 1944. One of the appendices to the plan, Map 14, shows the route running between the Reigate and Sevenoaks areas. The first part of the path to be completed, a 12 mi (19 km) section in the Leith Hill area was opened in June 1980. The remainder of the route in Surrey was inaugurated in May 1982, bringing the total length of the path to 55 mi (89 km). Kent County Council completed its planning work on the eastern part of the Greensand Way in 1983, and the 20 mi (32 km) section west if the River Medway opened in April 1986. The final part of the path, east of Yalding railway station, opened on 15 April 1989. In 1998, the county councils published a guidebook entitled Along and Around the Greensand Way.
