= Wotton and Abinger Commons =

Surrey nature reserve

Coordinates: 51.197°N 0.381°W

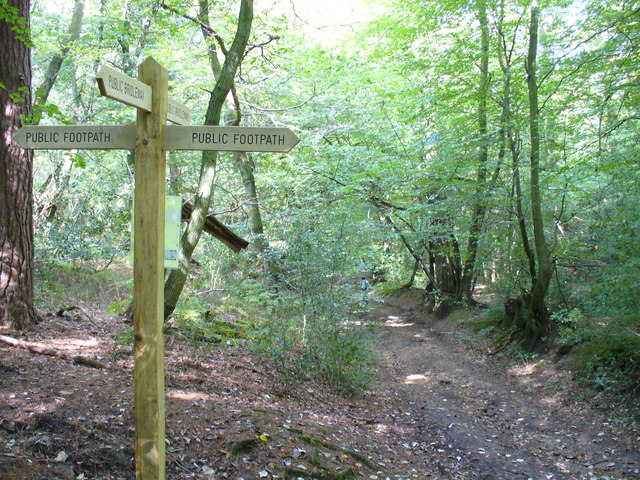
- Interactive map of Wotton and Abinger Commons
- Type: Nature reserve
- Location: Dorking, Surrey
- OS grid: TQ132454
- Area: 324 hectares (800 acres)
- Manager: Surrey Wildlife Trust

Wotton and Abinger Commons is a 324-hectare (800-acre) nature reserve south-west of Dorking in Surrey. It is managed by the Surrey Wildlife Trust. Part of it is in Leith Hill Site of Special Scientific Interest

Abinger Common, which was formerly a grazing heath, is a wood with sessile oak dominant and a shrub layer of holly and bilberry. Wotton Common has many paths and bridleways through calcareous grassland, heath and woodland.

The site has several entrances listed on the reserve website.
