= Hascombe Hill =

Hill fort in Surrey, England

Hascombe Camp
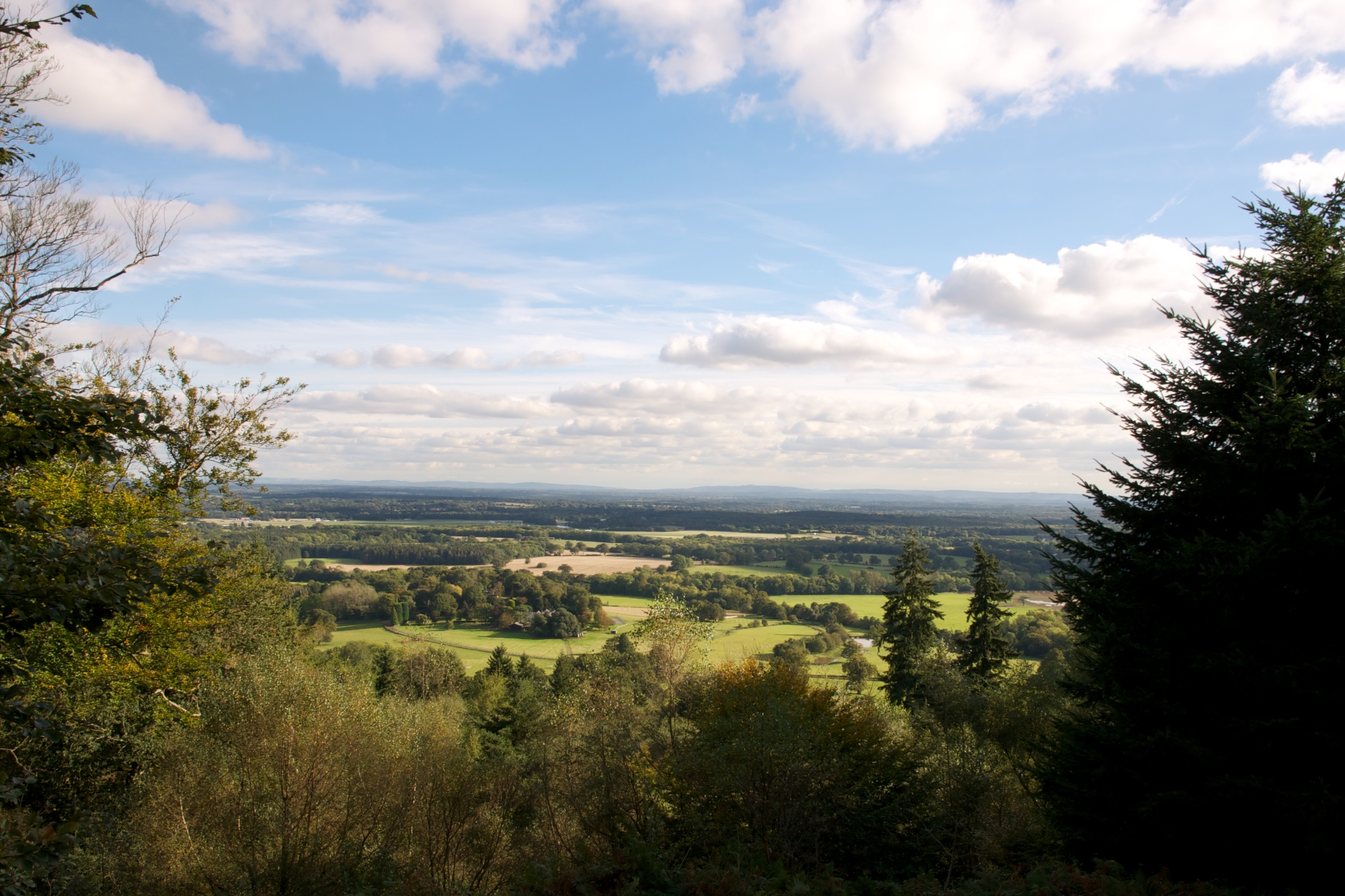
- Looking south from Hascombe Hill

- Location within Surrey
- 51°08′15″N 0°33′55″W
- Type: Hill fort
- Location: Hascombe
- OS grid reference: TQ 00501 38662

History
- Built: Iron Age

Site notes
- Area: Surrey

Scheduled monument
- Official name: Hascombe Camp
- Designated: 20 October 1994
- Reference no.: 1008522

Hascombe Hill or Hascombe Camp is the site of an Iron Age multivallate hill fort close to the village of Hascombe in Surrey, England.

== History ==
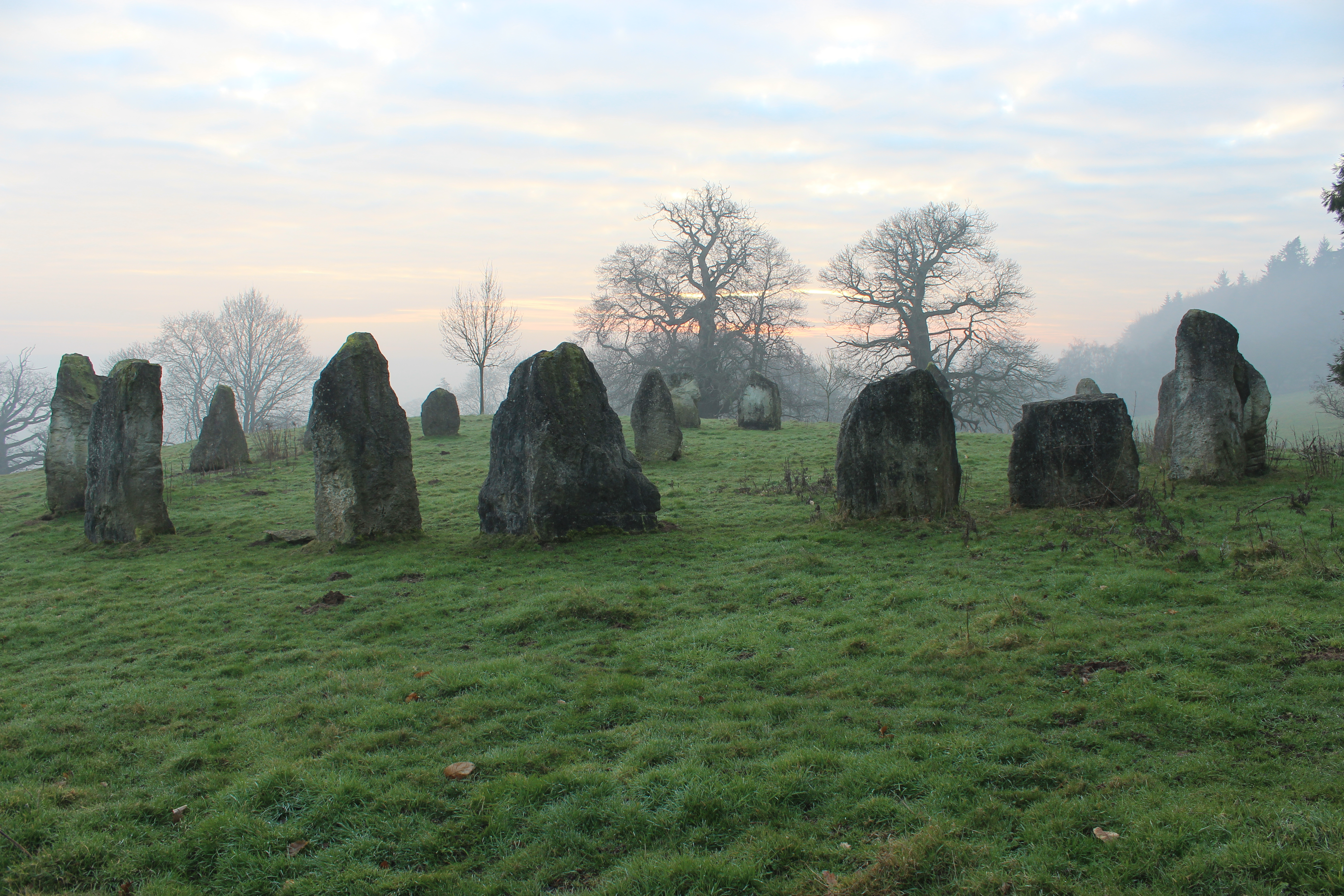
Stone circle

The site was excavated in 1931 by S. E. Winbolt, who dated the occupation of the site to the 1st century BCE. The hillfort encloses a thickly wooded area of approximately 2.4 hectares (6 acres). The sides of the fort, which are naturally very steep, were scarped at the top to make them almost unassailable. Encircling the crest of the hill is a defensive ditch 1.5 metres (5 ft) deep. The defences are reinforced on the northeast side (where the hillfort joins the rest of the hill) with a strong line of ramparts and ditches broken by a single entrance passage some 24 metres (80 ft) long.

There is pottery evidence that the site was occupied until quite late and signs that it was forcefully evacuated, possibly coinciding with the Roman invasions under Julius Caesar in 55 and 54 BCE.

In the early 19th century it became an important naval telegraph station, using a mechanical form of semaphore to communicate with Netley Heath in Surrey on one side and Blackdown in Sussex on the other. A chain of such stations linked the Admiralty with Portsmouth.

Hascombe Hill is 196 metres (644 ft) high.

In the 1990s the Modern Order of Druids erected a stone circle below the south-eastern slopes of Hascombe Hill.

== Sources ==
- Surrey Archaeological Society Journal 40, p. 78
- Dyer, James The Penguin Guide to Prehistoric England & Wales (1981), p. 237

Next station upwards	Admiralty Shutter telegraph line 1795	Next station downwards
Netley Heath	Hascombe Hill	Blackdown
