= Polsted =

Polsted is a surname. Notable people with the surname include:

- Henry Polsted (by 1510–1555), MP for Guildford
- Thomas Polsted, MP for Great Bedwyn
- Richard Polsted, MP for Hindon
