= Blackheath Common =

Open area in Waverley, Surrey, England

- Location within Surrey
- Interactive map of Blackheath Common
- Location: Waverley
- Nearest town: Albury
- Coordinates: 51°12′15″N 0°30′51″W
- Area: 250 acres (100 ha)
- Operator: National Trust; Albury Estates; Waverley Borough Council
- Designation: SSSI

Blackheath Common is an area of 250 acres (100 ha) of heathland in Surrey, England, near the village of Albury in the borough of Waverley. It is part of the Surrey Hills Area of Outstanding Natural Beauty, and much of the common is a designated Site of Special Scientific Interest. It is frequented by many walkers and cyclists.

== See also ==
- Blackheath SSSI, Surrey
- Blackheath village
