= Crooksbury Hill =

Nature reserve in Surrey, England

Coordinates: 51.206°N 0.745°W

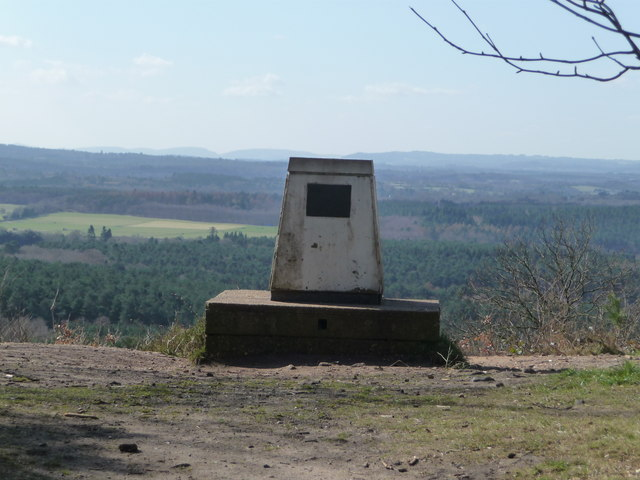
- Trig Point on Crooksbury Hill
- Interactive map of Crooksbury Hill
- Type: Nature reserve
- Location: Farnham, Surrey
- OS grid: SU 878 459
- Area: 17.2 hectares (43 acres)
- Manager: Surrey Wildlife Trust

Crooksbury Hill is a 17.2-hectare (43-acre) nature reserve within Puttenham and Crooksbury Commons east of Farnham in Surrey. It is owned by Surrey County Council and managed by the Surrey Wildlife Trust. Soldier's Ring on the north side of the hill is a Scheduled Monument. It is a hillfort dating to the late Bronze Age or early Iron Age.

There are extensive views from the top of the hill over south-west Surrey and east Hampshire. The site has sandy soil with heath and woodland. It was formerly part of Crooksbury Common, and the trees were planted after the area was enclosed in 1848.

There is access from Botany Hill.
