= Sandhills, Surrey =

Hamlet in Surrey, England

Coordinates: 51.135°N 0.663°W

Sandhills
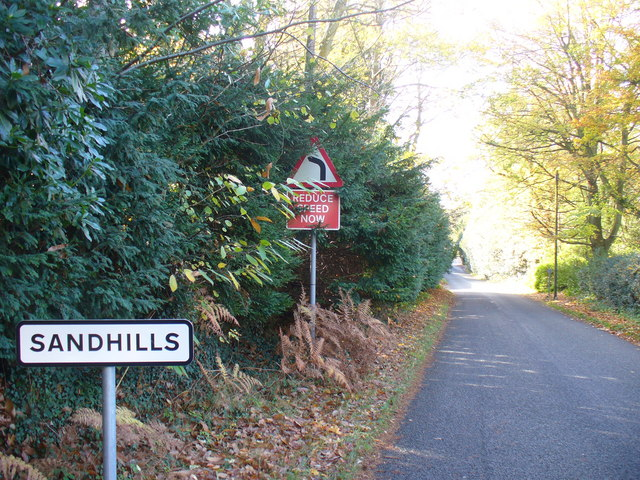
- Entering Sandhills

- Location within Surrey
- Civil parish: Witley and Milford
- District: Waverley
- Shire county: Surrey
- Region: South East
- Country: England
- Sovereign state: United Kingdom
- Police: Surrey
- Fire: Surrey
- Ambulance: South East Coast
- UK Parliament: Godalming and Ash

Sandhills is a small hamlet located between the villages of Wormley and Brook, in the civil parish of Witley and Milford, in the Waverley district, in the county of Surrey, England. It is part of the Surrey Hills Area of Outstanding Beauty and situated on the Greensand Way.

There is a common owned by the National Trust, and a Donkey sanctuary, founded by John and Kay Lockwood in the 1950s and now operated by the RSPCA.
