= Greensand Ridge =

Range of hills in south east England

Coordinates: 51°10′N 0°22′W

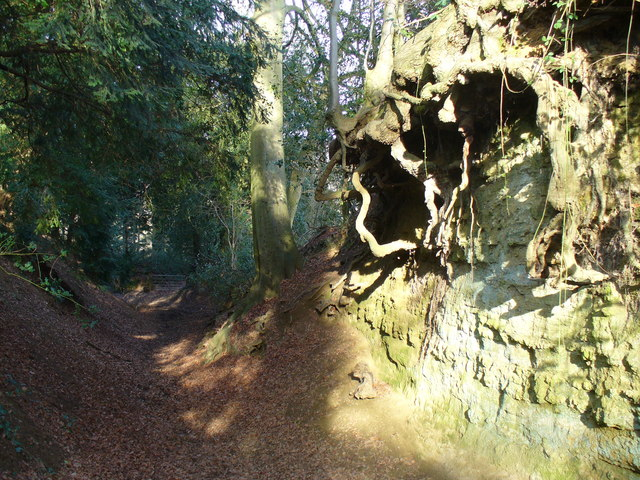
An eroded sunken lane on the Greensand Ridge

The Greensand Ridge, also known as the Wealden Greensand, is an extensive, prominent, often wooded, mixed greensand/sandstone escarpment in south-east England. Forming part of the Weald, a former dense forest in Sussex, Surrey and Kent, it runs to and from the East Sussex coast, wrapping around the High Weald and Low Weald. It reaches its highest elevation, 294 metres (965 ft), at Leith Hill in Surrey—the second highest point in south-east England, while another hill in its range, Blackdown, is the highest point in Sussex at 280 metres (919 ft). The eastern end of the ridge forms the northern boundary of Romney Marsh.

About 51 per cent of the Wealden Greensand is protected as the South Downs National Park, Kent Downs Area of Outstanding Natural Beauty and Surrey Hills Area of Outstanding Natural Beauty.

== Geology and soils ==
A geological cross-section, from north to south, through the Wealden dome in Kent and Sussex

=== Geological history ===
The Greensand Ridge, formed of Lower Greensand, much of which is sandstone and where hardest is locally termed Bargate stone, is a remnant of the Weald dome, part of the great Weald-Artois Anticline that runs from south-east England into northern France.

The Weald dome consists of a series of geological strata laid down in the Cretaceous that have subsequently been lifted up, formed into a dome (i.e. anticline) and then deformed and faulted. The top-most and therefore youngest layer of the dome is Chalk, laid down in the Upper Cretaceous. Below it lie successively older strata of alternating clays and sandstones laid down in the Lower Cretaceous, namely Upper Greensand, Gault Clay, Lower Greensand, Weald Clay and the Hastings Beds. Differential fluvial erosion has virtually flattened the dome into a series of hills and vales. On the surface the strata of which the dome is composed crop out in a series of concentric circles, shaped like a horseshoe, with the more resistant chalk and sandstones forming hills and ridges (such as the North and South Downs, the Greensand Ridge, and the High Weald), and the weaker clays forming vales (such as the Low Weald) between them. The very resistant rocks of the Lower Greensand, in particular the Hythe Beds, have produced prominent escarpments that form an arc around the northern edge of the Low Weald, running parallel to and just south of the chalk escarpment of the North Downs. This stretch of the Greensand has become the most closely identified with the term "Greensand Ridge", and it includes the second highest point in south-east England, Leith Hill in Surrey. West of the Weald the Lower Greensand has produced a more extensive area of hills and valleys, including the highest point in Sussex, Blackdown. On the south side of the Weald the Lower Greensand also forms another arc of rather less pronounced hills parallel to and just north of the South Downs, which become less prominent the further east one goes.

=== Geology ===
The Lower Greensand is a predominantly arenaceous sandstone consisting of sediment that accumulated apparently in a shallow sea in the later part of the Lower Cretaceous. It also contains important subsidiary elements of silty and argillaceous material. Chert, ironstone and calcareous deposits occur in small amounts. When fresh the rocks have a greenish colouration owing to the presence of glauconite, but on exposure to the atmosphere this is rapidly oxidised to limonite, giving rise to a yellow or reddish brown staining.

The Lower Greensand is composed of alternating mudstones (sandy, with clay particles such as smectite) and sandstones, up to a maximum thickness of about 400 metres (1,300 ft), and is composed of a number of distinct formations, namely the Folkestone Beds, Sandgate Beds, Bargate Beds, Hythe Beds and Atherfield Clay.

=== Soils ===
The soil of the Greensand is quite varied, ranging from fertile to fairly sterile. On the fertile soils we see chestnut and stands of hazel and oak, while Scots Pine and Birch colonise the poorer soils.

== Relief and drainage ==
Broadly speaking, the Greensand Ridge runs along the northern edge of the Weald in a west-east arc from Surrey into Kent, just south of and parallel to the chalk escarpment of the North Downs. The ridge is separated by a mixed deep and shallow, fertile depression from the North Downs referred to as the 'Vale of Holmesdale', formed on Gault Clay, and a narrow band of Upper Greensand that outcrops at the foot of the chalk scarp (ridge). In some places the clay vale is very narrow: for example at Oxted the gap between summits of the Greensand Ridge and the North Downs is less than 2 kilometres (1.2 mi).

The Greensand Ridge, capped by the resistant sands and sandstones of the Hythe Beds, reinforced by bands of chert, rises steeply as a series of high, wooded escarpments between Gibbet Hill, Hindhead (272 metres (892 ft)), north of Haslemere, and the ridge's highest point, Leith Hill (294 metres (965 ft)). It then flattens for several miles, before re-emerging east of Nutfield to run eastwards as a high wooded ridge into an area between Oxted and Sevenoaks known locally as the Chartlands, where it reaches another high point at Toys Hill, Kent (235 metres (771 ft)). Here there are views to the south of the Weald from a terrace donated in 1898 by Octavia Hill, one of the founders of the National Trust. The ridge continues eastwards past Sevenoaks, until south-west of Maidstone it is broken by the valley of the River Medway. The ridge then continues as far as Pluckley, Kent. From there the land levels until it drops to the old sea-cliff line above Romney Marsh.

In the area around Haslemere local anticlinal features are superimposed on the main axis of the Wealden anticline, causing the outcrop of resistant Hythe Beds to widen from 2 kilometres (1.2 mi) to more than 12 kilometres (7.5 mi) and to produce an escarpment that is particularly marked between Haslemere and Midhurst, where Blackdown rises to 280 metres (920 ft), the highest point in Sussex. South of here the Vale of Fernhurst has been eroded down into the Low Weald by what is now a small stream following a line of a gentle west-east trending upfold. This stream, the River Lod, runs parallel to the larger River Rother which flows about 10 km further south in the lee of the chalk escarpment of the South Downs. Valley slope processes in the Vale of Fernhurst have resulted in escarpments to the north and south that are steep enough to have collapsed by land slipping. Further east, the Lower Greensand has not produced any pronounced topographical features.

In many places along the escarpment of the Greensand Ridge erosion by wind and rain, landslips on the steep scarp face, and solifluction in glacial times have further combined to create steep-side coombes, and low hillocks below the scarp.

== Relationship to the Weald ==
The Greensand Ridge is sometimes associated with the Weald; the ridge forms the high border of area of the Weald.

The Jutes and Saxons who settled in south-east England in the centuries following the collapse of the Roman empire applied the term Weald (a Germanic term for woodland) to the very large, heavily wooded forest that they found lying inland of the coastal lands and river valleys that they initially settled. This forest, difficult to penetrate and settle, and difficult to exploit agriculturally, in due course became an essential part of a system of transhumance whereby each autumn swine would be driven, sometimes over long distances, from the longer-settled areas on the periphery into the Wealden forest to feed on acorns of oak trees and beech mast. For these peoples the term Weald did not include the land cleared of forest and settled earlier, such as the fertile Vale of Holmesdale (which separates the North Downs from the Greensand Ridge), nor the more lightly wooded and open hills found on the sandstones of the Greensand Ridge, which also seem to have been settled earlier. Local people regarded the hills of the Greensand Ridge as overlooking the Weald, rather than forming a part of it, and hence a distinction came to be made between the settlements on the Greensand Ridge, such as Sevenoaks, Sundridge Upland and Boughton Malherbe Upland, and those formed during the later medieval colonisation of the Wealden portion of these parishes, called today Sevenoaks Weald, Sundridge Weald and Boughton Malherbe Weald.

A practice of treating the Greensand Ridge regularly as part of the Weald arose in geology when natural scientists, starting in the late 18th century, began to include it in their analysis of the geological history of the Wealden dome. Geology still confuses by using interchangeably the Weald and the "Wealden Anticline" that embraces all the land bounded by the chalk escarpments of the North and South Downs, including the Greensand hills.

== Economic exploitation ==
The Folkestone Beds consist of seams of pebbles and sand. It is from here that the stone known as chert is found, familiar in the High Chart hills around Limpsfield, Surrey. In Surrey the Sandgate Beds and Bargate Beds, which lie on top of the Hythe Beds, have yielded a distinctive yellow stone seen in many local buildings. Ironstone, from layers embedded in the Sandgate Beds, is often seen in chips (gallets) pressed into the mortar between such stones. To the east, especially around Maidstone, Kent, the Hythe Beds yield a blue-grey sandstone with a high lime content. Known as ragstone, this is seen in many local buildings.

Fuller's earth, which lies interbedded between the Bargate and Sandgate Layers, was much quarried for the cloth industry. The seam, which lies about 20 to 30 feet below the surface between Nutfield and Bletchingley, was considered the best in the country and for several centuries large quantities were excavated. Resources are now running low and little is now extracted.

== Settlements ==
Principal settlements lying on the southern part of the Greensand in Sussex, adjacent to the South Downs, include Storrington (at the eastern end of the ridge) and Midhurst. Petersfield marks the western end, where the ridge turns north east. Settlements on the main part of the ridge, running from Surrey into Kent include Haslemere, Godalming, Reigate and Redhill, Oxted and Sevenoaks.

== Recreation ==
Much of the ridge in Surrey and Kent is followed by a long-distance walking route, the Greensand Way. Extending for 108 miles, it starts in the west at Haslemere and ends in the east at Ham Street, Kent, on the edge of Romney Marsh. The route passes through or close to Godalming, Cranleigh, Dorking, Reigate, Redhill, South Nutfield, Oxted, Westerham, Sevenoaks, Maidstone and Ashford.

== Statutory designations ==
The south-west part of the Greensand ridge and hills is in the South Downs National Park. Much of the Greensand Ridge in Surrey is one limb of the Surrey Hills Area of Outstanding Natural Beauty while a section of the Greensand hills in western Kent, from Limpsfield Chart near Westerham through Sevenoaks to Plaxtol, forms part of the Kent Downs Area of Outstanding Natural Beauty, where it is known as the Sevenoaks Greensand Ridge.

== Principal summits ==
The following hills within the National Character Area have at least 30 metres of topographic prominence:

Hill	Elevation	Prominence	Grid reference
Leith Hill	294 m (965 ft)	247 m	TQ139431
Black Down	280.8 m (921 ft)	192.3 m	SU919296
Gibbet Hill	272 m (892 ft)	128 m	SU899359
Holmbury Hill	261 m (856 ft)	107 m	TQ103429
Pitch Hill	257 m (843 ft)	85 m	TQ082423
The Warren	251 m (823 ft)	33 m	TQ076424
Toy's Hill	248 m (814 ft)	117 m	TQ469520
Wheatsheaf Hill	217.7 m (714 ft)	41.7 m	TQ490516
Marley Heights	216 m (709 ft)	53 m	SU890302
Crockham Hill	216 m (709 ft)	41 m	TQ445514
Hatch Farm Hill	211 m (692 ft)	43 m	SU898298
Telegraph Hill	207 m (679 ft)	130 m	SU870264
Raspit Hill	207 m (679 ft)	37 m	TQ577548
Hascombe Hill	198.4 m (651 ft)	111 m	TQ010389
Hollycombe Hanger	193 m (633 ft)	69 m	SU858290
Grayswood Hill	193 m (633 ft)	44 m	SU912339
Breakneck Hill	189 m (620 ft)	62 m	SU997385
Hydon's Ball	181 m (594 ft)	48 m	SU977396
Tilburstow Hill	179.6 m (589 ft)	68 m	TQ353500
St Martha's Hill	175 m (574 ft)	58 m	TQ027483
Wick Hill	174 m (571 ft)	53 m	SU753356
Hurst Hill	168 m (551 ft)	74 m	TQ631543
Rutton Hill	167 m (548 ft)	37 m	SU909376
Rhode Hill	163.3 m (536 ft)	36 m	SU759335
Crooksbury Hill	163 m (535 ft)	87 m	SU878459
Combe Hill	162 m (531 ft)	43 m	SU797260
Green Hill	161 m (528 ft)	53 m	TQ863498
Longmoor	161 m (528 ft)	51 m	TQ138477
Beechwood Hill	160 m (525 ft)	38 m	TQ379512
Weavers Down	156 m (512 ft)	48 m	SU812305
Bedham Hill	155 m (509 ft)	122 m	TQ014221
Sandhills	155 m (509 ft)	51 m	SU939383
River Hill	149 m (489 ft)	40 m	SU785414
Dunner Hill	148 m (486 ft)	72 m	SU851254
Redhill Common	144 m (472 ft)	44 m	TQ272496
Tower Hill	142 m (466 ft)	54 m	TQ171485
Yewtree Nob	139.6 m (458 ft)	31 m	TQ007412
The Terrace	136 m (446 ft)	30 m	TQ174489
Park Hill	134 m (440 ft)	31 m	TQ251494
Upperton Common	132 m (433 ft)	75 m	SU954231
Lodge Inclosure	128 m (420 ft)	34 m	SU797426
Bury Hill	127 m (417 ft)	39 m	TQ155484
Chinthurst Hill	121 m (397 ft)	72 m	TQ013458
The Devil's Jumps	121 m (397 ft)	34 m	SU869395
Birchetts Hill	114 m (374 ft)	56 m	TQ669520
Blackhouse Hill	97 m (318 ft)	31 m	TR172355
Longbury Hill	95 m (312 ft)	38 m	TQ111145
Broomershill	93.8 m (308 ft)	55 m	TQ071199
Aaron's Hill	85.8 m (281 ft)	30.1 m	SU964439
Goldwell Hill	78.9 m (259 ft)	32 m	TQ971423
Midhurst Common	74 m (243 ft)	36 m	SU873214
Hesworth Common	69 m (226 ft)	33 m	TQ005192
Fittleworth Common	59 m (194 ft)	33 m	TQ017189
Park Mound	58 m (190 ft)	40 m	TQ037189

== Bibliography ==
- Brandon, Peter (2003). The Kent & Sussex Weald. Phillimore & Co Ltd. ISBN 1-86077-241-2.
- Cowan, Bea (1997). Along and Around the Greensand Way (2nd ed.). Kingston upon Thames: Surrey County Council. ISBN 1-899706-35-6.
- Friend, Peter (2008). Southern England. Looking at the Natural Landscapes. London: Collins. ISBN 978-0-00-724743-1.
- Gallois, R.W., ed. (1965). British Regional Geology: The Wealden District. London: Her Majesty's Stationery Office. ISBN 0-11-884078-9.
