= Vale of Holmesdale =

Valley in Surrey and Kent, England

Coordinates: 51°14′N 0°20′W

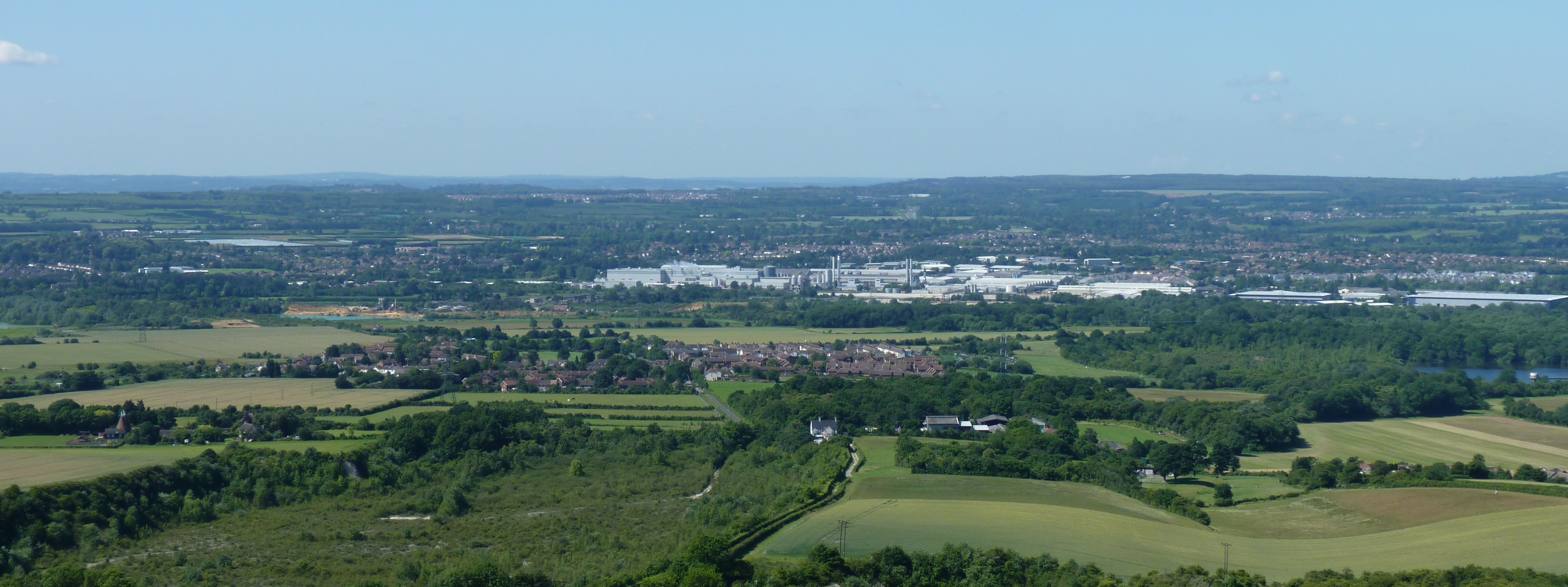
Looking south from Blue Bell Hill across the Medway Valley a deep part of the valley, with the village of Eccles in the foreground, the Aylesford Newsprint plant in the middle ground, Ditton and Maidstone beyond.

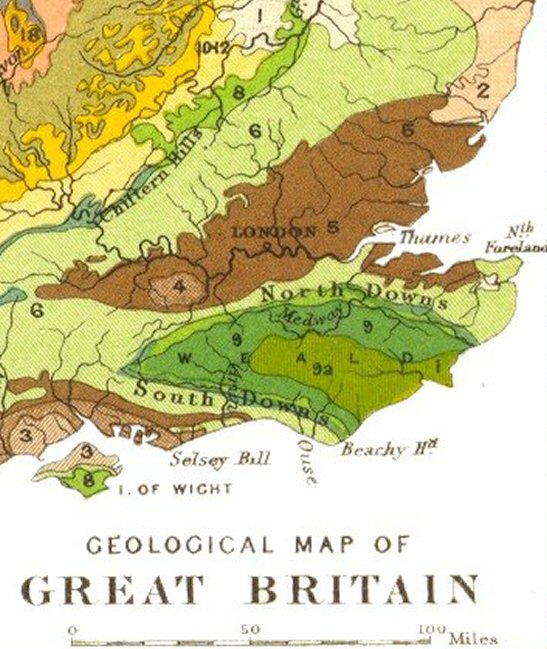
Geology of the South East, The vale is the thin lime green belt

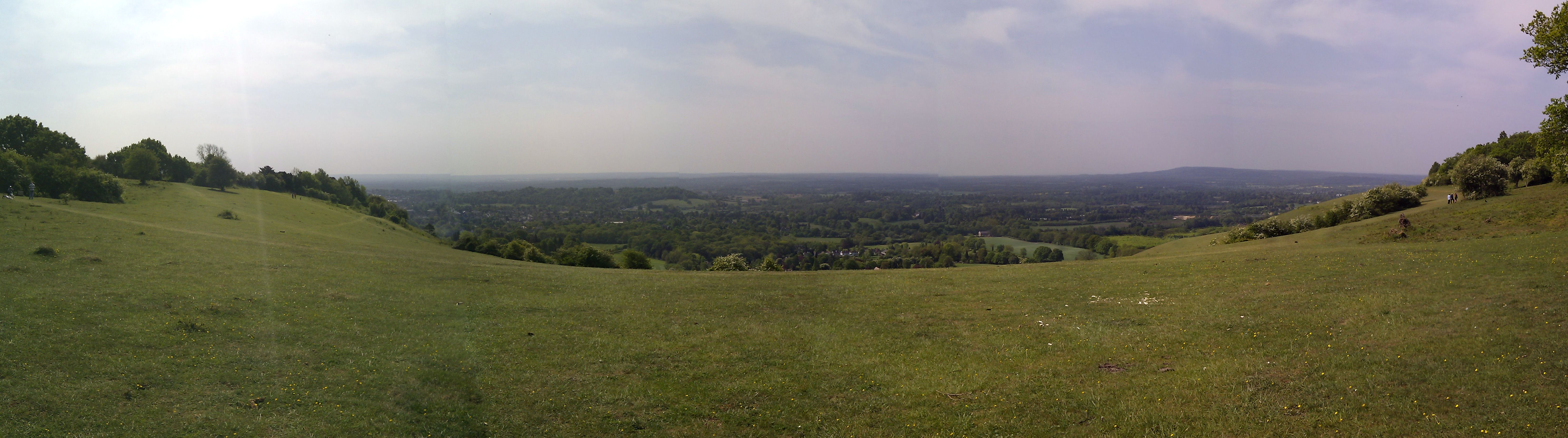
View from North downs towards Reigate.

A cross-section, showing the Wealden Dome, and relating it to the towns of Kent

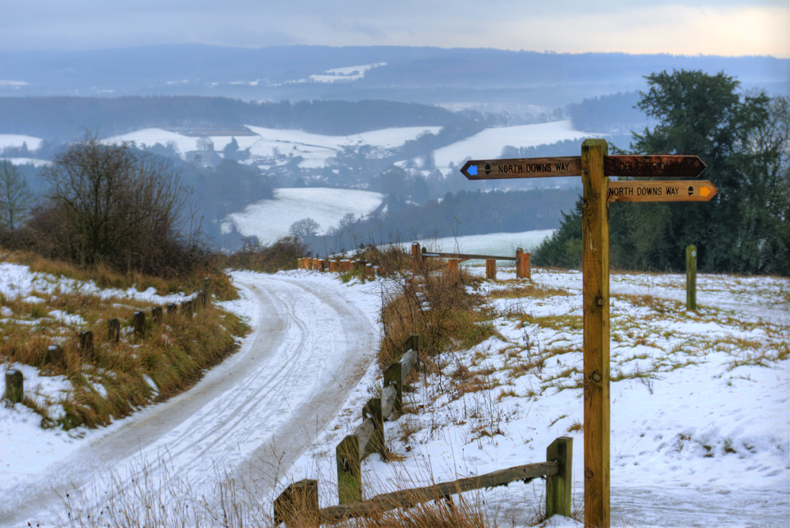
the view from Newlands Corner near to Guildford showing the richness of this undeveloped part of the valley's agriculture and natural habitat

Holmesdale, also known as the Vale of Holmesdale, is a valley in South-East England that falls between the hill ranges of the North Downs and the Greensand Ridge of the Weald, in the counties of Kent and Surrey. It stretches from Folkestone on the Kent coast, through Ashford, Harrietsham, Maidstone, Riverhead/Sevenoaks, Westerham, Oxted, Godstone, Redhill, Reigate, Dorking, Gomshall, and Guildford – west of which it is also called by the local name of "Puttenham Vale" – as it continues through the village of Puttenham, to the market town of Farnham.

== Geology ==
Holmesdale is part of the Weald Basin and Weald-Artois Anticline. The valley is bordered on its north side by the chalk escarpment of the North Downs, and on its south side by the dip slope of the Greensand Ridge.

The valley's composition is primarily Gault Clay and Upper Greensand, with Lower Chalk wash at the foot of the Downs along its north edge and eroded Lower Greensand at its south edge also forming part of the valley floor in places. The vale gently ascends and descends several times along its length, with higher elevations near Lenham and Westerham (in Kent), and Wotton (in Surrey) acting as drainage divides for the valley's several drainage basins and rivers.

== Rivers ==
The valley is part of the drainage basins of the rivers Stour and Medway; and the Thames tributaries the Darent and Mole.

== Transport ==
The M25 motorway runs westward along Holmesdale after descending through the North Downs near Sevenoaks (Junction 5), before ascending up the downs again at Reigate (Junction 8). The A25 road connects the towns and villages in Holmesdale from Wrotham Heath to Shere, alternating between running in the valley and running along the Greensand Ridge. At Shere the A25 ascends the downs, passing over the top at Newlands Corner, to run north of the downs to Guildford.

The North Downs railway line runs along the valley from Redhill to Gomshall.

== Usage of the term ==
Local businesses, schools, and clubs use the valley's name, for example the Holmesdale Building Society in Reigate; The Holmesdale School in Snodland; and the Holmesdale Natural History Club, founded in 1857, which runs a museum of the same name in Reigate.

== See also ==
- Geology of Kent
- Geology of Surrey
- Greensand Ridge
- North Downs
- Vale of Kent
- Weald
