= Godalming Hundred =

Historical division of Surrey, England

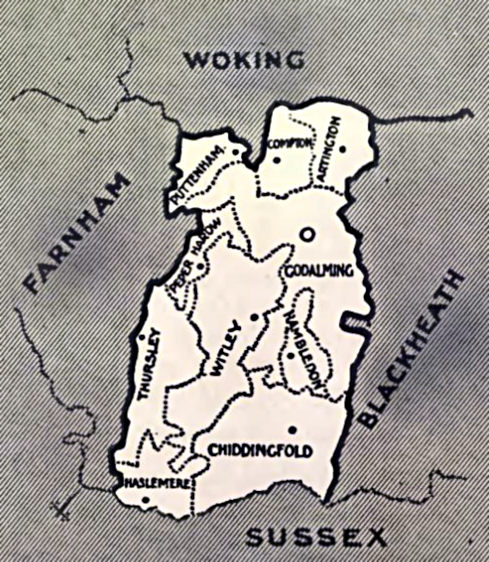
- History
  - Created: in antiquity
  - Abolished: 1889
- Status: hundred

Godalming was an ancient hundred in the south west of the county of Surrey, England. It corresponds to the central third of the current borough of Waverley and some parts of the current borough of Guildford. Broadly speaking it extended from Guildown in the north to the border with Sussex in the south. Local people maintain the notion of the hundred, sometimes colloquially referred to as Godhelmia, mainly because of the predominance of north–south routes of communication through the area that have existed since ancient times. As recently as 1995 there were proposals (from Surrey County Council) to recreate a local government unit based on the old hundred borders. The name of the hundred survives in the town of Godalming.

== History ==
The Hundred of Godalming was formed sometime after 825 when Wessex annexed the "south eastern provinces" of Surrey, Sussex, Kent and Essex.

=== Etymology ===
Godalming takes its name from the Old English Godhelm Ingas meaning "the clan of Godhelm". It is supposed that Godhelm was a Saxon chieftain who first colonised this dry land, bordered by swamps and a steep valley as he and his folk moved up the valley of the River Wey.

=== Early history ===
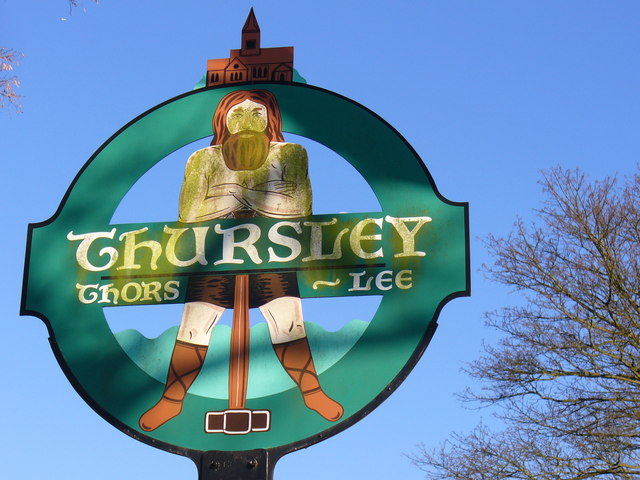
Thursley village sign showing the pagan god Thunor

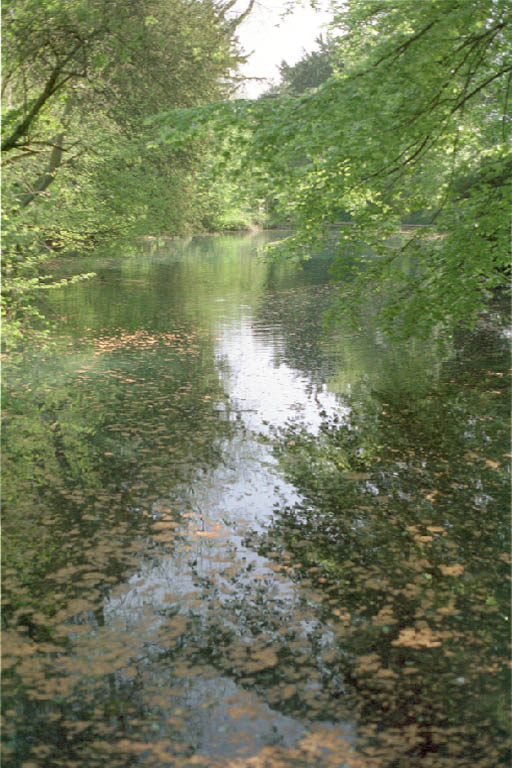
Silent Pool near Albury

Archæological evidence indicates that the Iron Age hill fort at Hascombe had been refortified by the Romano-Britons at the end of the Roman period and this would have been the main obstacle for Godhelm and his Saxons to overcome as they travelled up the Wey Valley in the early 6th century. They would have fought the native Britons who would fight, and enslaved those that could neither fight nor run, probably subduing the area quickly. The hill fort is found at the head of a valley containing the settlements of Hascombe, Thorncombe and Nurscombe. The suffix combe found in each of these names is derived from the Welsh word cŵm meaning "valley" and this may be evidence that a Welsh community sheltered by this fort could have remained south of Godalming for some time after the Saxons first began populating areas along the Wey Valley to the north. Initially the Godhelm Ingas would have had a quite an independent existence but the local Lord would have soon sworn fealty to a neighbouring king, be it South Saxons, East Saxons, Kentish or West Saxons depending on the politics of the time. It was not until 690 that the Godhelm Ingas were formally placed within the bounds of Surrey by treaty. Certainly the area would have been dominated by Sussex while Aelle was Bretwalda and later occupied by Wessex under Cædwalla.

=== Pre-Christian religious centre ===
Christianity is thought to have come relatively late to the Anglo Saxons of Surrey with the religion being formally established sometime after 675 when Surrey's only known sub-king Frithuwold converted and founded Chertsey Abbey. As such this area was one of the last in southern England to convert formally to Christianity. Nevertheless, the area around Godalming has been described as "one of the most religiously dominated landscapes in England" and is and was a deeply pagan place.

On a hill just south of Godalming town there was once a religious site dedicated to the war god Tiw at Tuesley (Old English Tīws leah) meaning "Tiw's Clearing". Close to this site can also be found a "holy well" called Lady Well. Access to both these sites is restricted by order of Ladywell Convent, a convent which owns the surrounding land.

Another pagan site, this time dedicated to the god Thunor, is at the nearby village of Thursley. Adjacent to this village is the appropriately named "Hammer Pond". The local parish council assert that the name Thursley (Old English Þunres leah) means the "sacred grove of Thunor." An outcrop of sandstone on a prominence on Thursley Common was believed to have been Thor’s Stone, created by a thunderbolt thrown by the god. This stone, also called the Cricklestone, now lies almost unknown since its reputation was transferred erroneously to a block of chert (alias the Pudstone) near Pudmore pond in 1896 by the popular Victorian writer Sabine Baring-Gould in his book The Broom-squire.

There still remains much mystery concerning a very ancient yew tree at Peper Harow or Pipers Hearg meaning "Piper's Temple" whereat the tree itself may have been the actual object of worship (see: Irminsul). The tree is now contained within a church yard and surrounded by graves.

An even more ancient grove made up of many very ancient yew trees as well as oaks that are believed to have been used by druids is at Newland's Corner, near Merrow. Close to this grove is Silent Pool - an ancient lake once used for ritual offerings. It is still thought to be haunted by either a "sprite" or an "Anglo-Saxon maiden" and until relatively recently was still considered "bottomless". Other groves are suggested in the name of the village of Grafham which means "farm by the grove", a further "holy well" or spring now called Bonfield Well or Bonville Spring can be found close to the hamlet of Oxenford near Peper Harow and Shackstead Lane in Godalming may take its name from Scucca-stead meaning "place of the evil spirit."

The name of Hascombe village translates as Hægtesse combe meaning "valley of the hag" and this name once referred to the location of a witch. This village, only a few miles south of Godalming, lies in a valley beneath the wooded remains of a Romano-British Hill fort on Hascombe Hill that is still occasionally used for 'alternative' wedding ceremonies. Similarly, Hydon's Ball - a steep hill between Tuesley and Hambledon - is extolled by Neopagans as "a preferred location for pre-dawn celebrations on May Day."

Other more obscure pagan "sanctuaries" in the vicinity are said to have been at Cusanweoh (possibly at Culverwell Hill adjacent to the ruins of Waverley Abbey) and Besingahearh, now lost but thought to be near Farnham. These sites are both mentioned in a charter signed by Caedwalla dating to 688 in which they were awarded to the church.

After the Hundred formally converted to Christianity most of those shrines were placed under the supervision of monks and nuns to ensure the old religion was suppressed. In some cases, the former pagan sites were sanctified as chapels as was the case in Peper Harow where there is still a small church next to the ancient tree. Tuesley was similarly sanctified and became the location of Godalming's "mother church". A small chapel existed here from the time of the conversion until the 16th century when it finally collapsed. Since 1956 a convent has existed adjacent to this old worship site and the former 'sacred spring' which now falls within the convents grounds was at some point renamed "Lady Well", referring to the Virgin Mary. The piece of rough ground adjacent to the convent where the ruins of the old chapel and the earlier shrine to Tiw are buried is still owned by the convent. A notice here specifically forbids public gatherings on the night of 21 December. In the 11th century a new parish church was built on recently drained land by the river in Godalming town. The oldest part of the Church of S.S. Peter & Paul – the Anglo-Saxon chapel – still survives today and in it can be seen an ancient stone (c.820AD) decorated with pagan carvings which is thought to have been brought down from the original 7th-century chapel at Tuesley on the hill.

=== Christian era ===
Godalming Hundred continues to be one of the most densely wooded parts of England and until the Middle Ages was largely covered by the Forest of Essera – a northern lobe of the ancient and vast Forest of Andred. People survived through pig farming and the making of charcoal. During the reign of Alfred the Great a defensive burgh was built at nearby Eashing to defend the area against the Vikings in around 885. By 1086 the population of the entire hundred is thought to have been only about 600 people. Under the West Saxon local government model Godalming Hundred would have had a Hundred Reeve and a Hundred Court or moot. This moot is known to have met at the site of the present day Pepperpot in the centre of Godalming.

=== King Alfred's Will ===
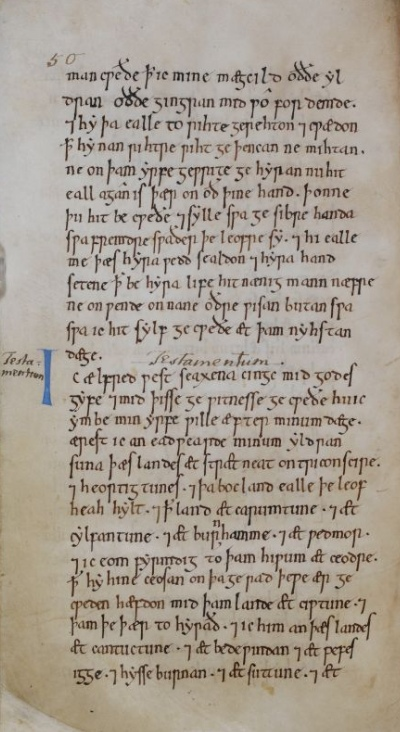
Will of Alfred the Great, AD 873–888, mentions Godelmingum (11th-century copy, British Library Stowe MS 944, ff. 29v–33r)

In the will of the West Saxon king Alfred the Great (written c.899), it is recorded that Godalming and neighbouring Guildford are given to his nephew Æthelwold, the surviving son (and heir) of Alfred's older brother and predecessor Athelred I. It is unlikely that Æthelwold ever took possession of Godalming because immediately after Alfred died he rose in revolt in Dorset against Alfred's successor, Edward, before fleeing to the Danelaw and dying in 902.

=== Domesday ===
In 1086 the Domesday Book states that Godalming was owned by the King and had been a royal demesne prior to the Norman Conquest. Of the settlements in the Hundred the Domesday book states:

- Godalming - Is recorded as being owned by King William I and previously owned by King Edward the Confessor. At the time of the survey it had three mills and two slaves. The Anglo-Saxon lord before 1066 was called Wulfmer "who held it for the king" and he was replaced by Ranulf Flambard by William the Conqueror. The large village was valuable with 25 acres (100,000 m^{2}) meadow and woodland for 100 pigs. During the reign of Edward it was said to be worth £25, increasing to £30 by 1086. The Norman surveyor says there was land enough for thirty ploughs but only records 22 actual ploughs suggesting he thought more money could be extracted from Godalming which under King Edward "had never been taxed".
- Tuesley - The surveyors note that "the same Ranulf (Flambard) holds from the king, Tuesley. It belongs to Godalming." Before the conquest it was owned by Leofwin and it had land for just one plough.
- Farncombe - Unlike Tuesley, this village appears distinctly separate from Godalming. Before the conquest it was owned by an Anglo-Saxon named Ansgot who "could go where he wished". However, by 1086 it would seem Ansgot was dead and it was now disputed between Bishop Odo of Bayeux and a local Anglo-Saxon reeve named Lufa, perhaps the son of Ansgot, "who claims this manor." The surveyors add that "the men of the Hundred testify that he (Lufa) held it from the king when the king was in Wales". It would appear that Odo of Bayeux did not agree.
- Puttenham - owned by Bishop Odo of Bayeux. Before the Conquest it was owned by Tovi the Proud "and he could go where he wished". It would appear this village was destroyed during the Norman Conquest of southern England because its post-conquest value is much less than its pre-conquest value. It had land for just one plough and 2 acres (8,100 m^{2}) of meadow, woodland for four pigs.
- Loseley - Owned by Earl Roger whose tenant is Thorold. Before the conquest the lord was Osmund. This was a profitable bit of land as it had risen in value since the conquest, which was unusual.
- Compton - Owned by Walter son of Othere. Before the conquest the lord was Brictsi. There were nine ploughs, seven slaves, a church and one mill.
- Peper Harow - A Norman named Gerard holds this village after the conquest. Before the conquest the land owner was Alward. There were six ploughs, one mill and no slaves with 7 acres (28,000 m^{2}) of meadow.
- Hurtmore - Tesselin holds Hurtmore for Edward of Salisbury, before the conquest it was Alwin who held it from king Edward. There were six ploughs, one mill and 6 acres (24,000 m^{2}) of meadow. The value had reportedly doubled from 50 shillings to 100 shillings since the conquest.
- Witley - Gilbert son of Richere de Aigle holds Witley. The area had land enough for 16 ploughs but was under-worked. There is a church and 3 acres (12,000 m^{2}) of meadow. Woodland for 30 pigs. The value was estimated at £16 - half the value of Godalming.
- Hambledon - After the conquest, Edward of Salisbury owns Hambledon but Ranulf Flambard seems to be the man on the ground. Azor held it during the time of king Edward. There are seven ploughs and a thirteen slaves plus one mill. There were 3 acres (12,000 m^{2}) of meadow and woodland for thirty pigs. Valued at 100 shillings.
- Littleton - the survey reveals that the only surviving Anglo-Saxon landowner in the area is recorded as holding Littleton. "Wulfwy Hunter holds from the king Littleton. He himself held it from king Edward." The surveyors note a very small holding with only two acres of meadow and a total value of just 20 shillings.

=== Modern era ===
In 1300 Godalming was granted the status of a town with a Town Warden and later a Mayor. The administration was based first in the Market House. This was used at one time to house French prisoners during the Napoleonic Wars. The Market House was demolished in 1814 and a new building nicknamed the Pepperpot was built in its place. When Surrey County Council was established in 1889 the old Anglo-Saxon Hundred Court system ended and the administrative centre was moved from the Pepperpot to Godalming Borough Hall on Bridge Street in 1908. The countryside around the town which had been part of the hundred, and other parishes once part of Farnham, became Hambledon Rural District. The Borough of Godalming was reduced in status back to simply a Town Council when Waverley borough was created in 1974.

== Parishes ==
| Parish | District in 1894 | District in 1974 | Hamlets | Ancient sites |
|---|---|---|---|---|
| Artington | Guildford Rural District | Guildford | Artington, Broadford, Littleton, Loseley, Tiltham's Green, Peasmarsh | |
| Busbridge | Hambledon Rural District | Waverley | Enton, North Munstead, Tuesley, South Munstead, Unstead, Winkworth | |
| Chiddingfold | Hambledon Rural District | Waverley | Ansteadbrook, Cherford, Chiddingfold, High Prestwick, High Street Green, Langhurst, Pickhurst, Ramsnest Common, Sydenhurst | A Roman villa |
| Compton | Guildford Rural District | Guildford | Compton, Eastbury, Polsted, Prior's Field | A Roman villa |
| Elstead | Hambledon Rural District | Waverley | Elstead, Hankley, Oxenford, Pot Common | Five Bronze Age tumuli |
| Godalming | Municipal Borough of Godalming | Waverley | Binscombe, Busbridge, Catteshall, Farncombe, Godalming, Hurtmore, Langham, Northbourne, Ockford | |
| Hambledon | Hambledon Rural District | Waverley | Burgate, Hambledon, Hydestile | |
| Hascombe | Hambledon Rural District | Waverley | Hascombe, Loxhill | Iron Age Hill fort |
| Haslemere | Haslemere Urban District | Waverley | Camelsdale, Coombe Head, Grayswood, Haslemere, Hindhead, Shottermill | |
| Peper Harow | Hambledon Rural District | Waverley | Burford, Gatwick, Ockley, Peper Harow | The Peper Harow Yew |
| Puttenham | Guildford Rural District | Guildford | Cutt Mill, Hurlands, Lascombe, Puttenham | Iron Age Hill fort |
| Shackleford | Guildford Rural District | Guildford | Lower Eashing, Lydling, Norney, Shackleford, Upper Eashing | Burh |
| Thursley | Hambledon Rural District | Waverley | Bowlhead Green, Emley, Thursley, Truxford | The Cricklestone (Thor's Stone) |
| Witley | Hambledon Rural District | Waverley | Birtley, Brook, Cramhurst, Culmer, Milford, Mousehill, Oxenford, Sandhills, Sattenham, Wheeler Street, Witley, Wormley | |

== See also ==
- Godalming
- Medieval Surrey
- Surrey hundreds
