= Calvert =

Calvert may refer to:

== People ==
- Calvert (name), about the name, including a list of people who bear it
- Calvert family, an English noble family

== Places ==
=== Australia ===
- Calvert Range, Western Australia
- Calvert River, Northern Territory

=== Canada ===
- Calvert, Newfoundland and Labrador
- Calvert Island, Ontario
- Calvert Island (British Columbia)

=== United Kingdom ===
- Calvert, Buckinghamshire, England
  - Calvert railway station
- Calvert Green, a civil parish in Buckinghamshire

=== United States ===
- Calvert, Alabama
- Calvert, Kansas
- Calvert, Maryland
- Calvert, Texas
- Calvert City, Kentucky (also formerly known as Calvert)
- Calvert County, Maryland
  - Calvert Cliffs Nuclear Power Plant
  - Calvert Cliffs State Park
- Calvert Street (disambiguation)

== Schools ==
- Calvert School (disambiguation)
- Calvert Hall College High School

== Other uses ==
- Calvert expedition, 1896 exploring expedition in north-central Western Australia
- Calvert Extra, an American brand of blended whiskey
- Calvert Investments, an investment management company
- Calvert Marine Museum
- USS Calvert, ship

== See also ==
- Calverton (disambiguation)
