= Tuesley =

Hamlet in Surrey, England

Coordinates: 51°10′01″N 0°37′34″W

- Hamlet
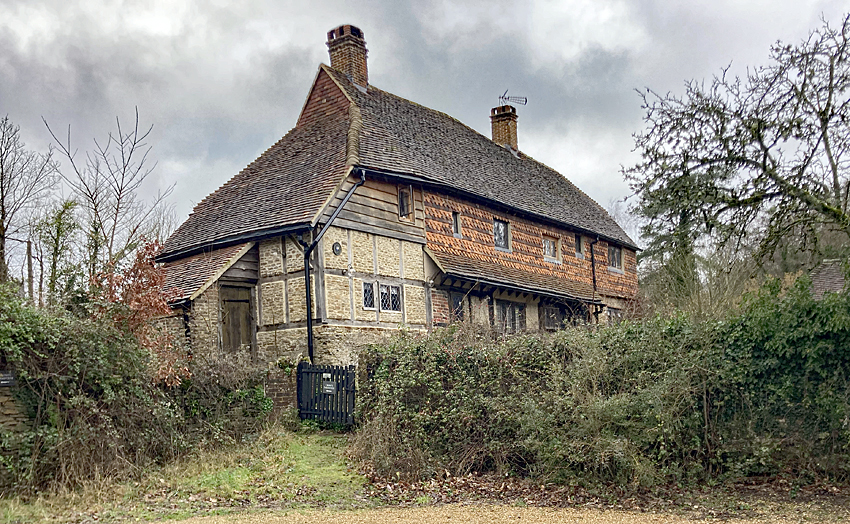
- Crowts farmhouse

- Location within Surrey
- OS grid reference: SU 963 418
- Civil parish: Munstead and Tuesley
- District: Waverley
- Shire county: Surrey
- Region: South East
- Country: England
- Sovereign state: United Kingdom
- Post town: GODALMING
- Postcode district: GU7
- Dialling code: 01483
- Police: Surrey
- Fire: Surrey
- Ambulance: South East Coast
- UK Parliament: Godalming and Ash

Tuesley is a hamlet in the civil parish of Munstead and Tuesley, in the Waverley district, in Surrey, England; between Godalming to the north, and Enton to the south.

== Toponymy ==
Tuesley is named for the Anglo-Saxon war-god Tīw and literally translates as his clearing (Tīwes lēah). This affirms the area as within the remnant weald which is the Germanic Old English for a forest, where trees were cut and a temple to the god created. Sometime in the 7th century, the temple was consecrated by Christians and a small chapel was erected.

== Geography ==
Tuesley is situated south of the Busbridge stream and east of the River Ock.

== History ==
Tuesley appears in Domesday Book of 1086 as Tiwesle, a subsidiary manor of Godalming that rendered £2 to its overlord. It was held by Rannulf Flambard from William the Conqueror (as a sub-tenant) and its recordable assets were: 1 hide and 1 plough and it had 8 households; one villager, I slave and 6 cottagers.

In 1220 the name was Tiwerlei, recorded in the Salisbury Register of St Osmund in 1220 as a chapel, then still standing but in a ruinous state, dedicated to the Blessed Virgin, the first church established in the manor, so known and recorded in Godalming records as "the mother church or the Oldminster" for centuries. By 1220, services were held only three times a year. A fair was held in the field on Lady Day (a quarter-day in the same cycle as Christmas) until 1540. The foundations of the minster were partly excavated in 1869 before being covered up again, only dry-stone walls and boundary posts mark the outline of the buried ruins.

Tuesley Manor is a Grade II listed building, with parts dating back to the 15th century. The manor was granted to Salisbury Cathedral by Henry I early in the 12th century. For many years it was leased to the Cotillion family. In 1846, it was transferred to the Ecclesiastical Commissioners who broke up the estate and sold it off in the 1860s. In 1966, it became home to Bronwen Pugh, Lady Astor. Next to the manor is Crowts Farm, the farmhouse and adjacent barn both date to the 15th century and are also Grade II listed.

=== 20th century to present ===
In 1909, the Milford Hospital was established on the high ground south of Tuesley Manor, initially as the county sanatorium. It later became, successively, a smallpox hospital, a tuberculosis treatment centre and, from 2010, a rehabilitation and diagnostic centre. In 2013, planning permission was granted for 108 new homes on land surrounding Milford Hospital that had become redundant for hospital use. This involved demolition of various surplus buildings on the site.

Tuesley Farm, east of the hospital, is a 969 acres (392 ha) farm producing soft fruit, strawberries, raspberries and blueberries, supplying a number of supermarket chains.

== Transport ==
The nearest railway station to Tuesley is Milford on the Portsmouth Direct line. There are no bus services to the hamlet.
