= Shackleford =

- Village and civil parish
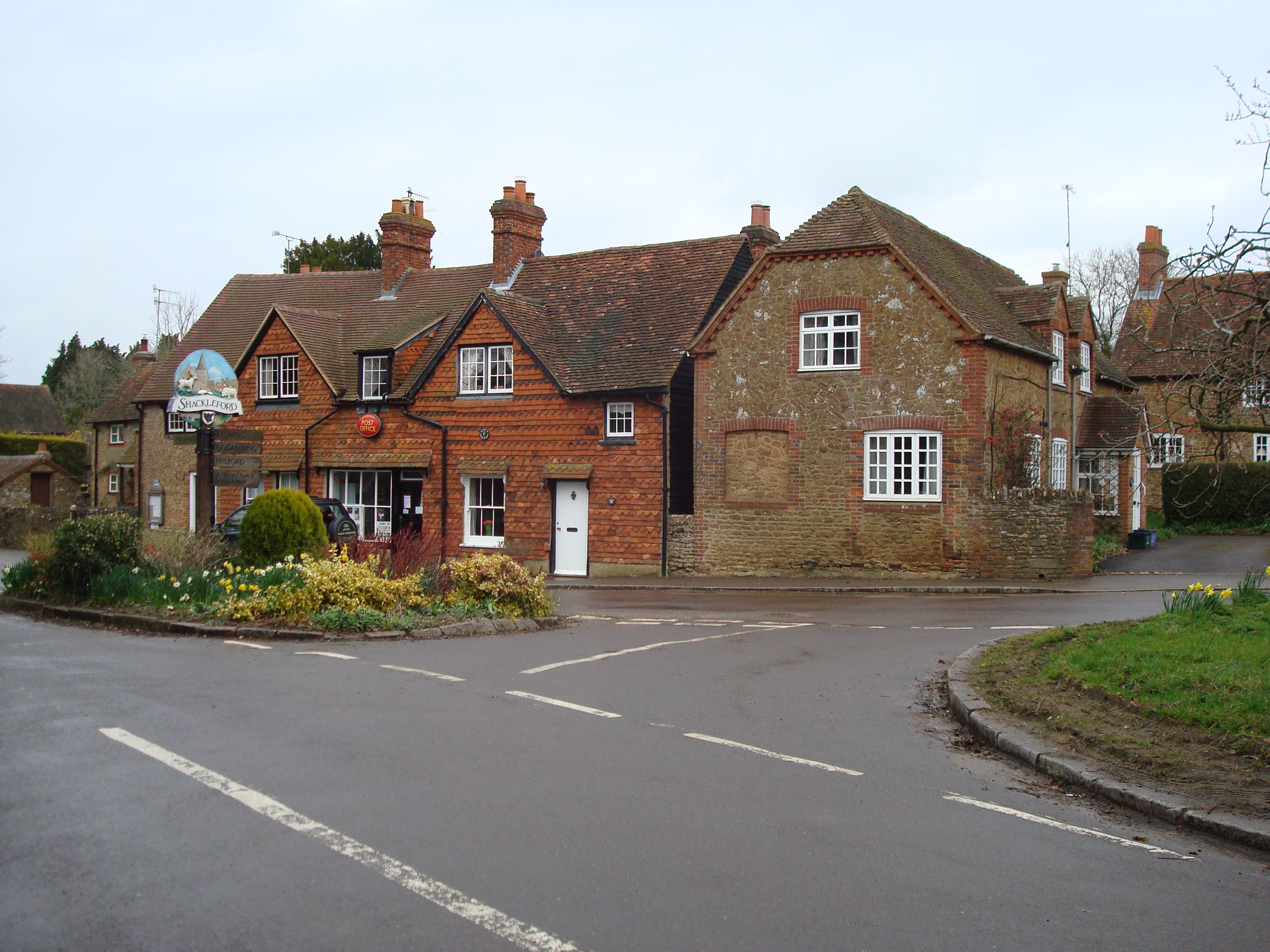
- Shackleford Post Office and Village Centre Sign

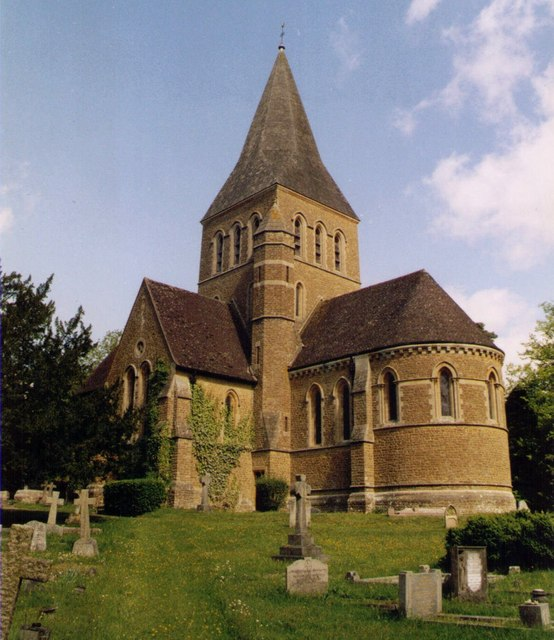
- St Mary's, Shackleford

- Location within Surrey
- Area: 8.03 km^{2} (3.10 sq mi)
- Population: 770 (Civil Parish 2011)
  - Density: 96/km^{2} (250/sq mi)
- OS grid reference: SU941451
- Civil parish: Shackleford
- District: Guildford (borough)
- Shire county: Surrey
- Region: South East
- Country: England
- Sovereign state: United Kingdom
- Post town: Godalming
- Postcode district: GU8
- Dialling code: 01483
- Police: Surrey
- Fire: Surrey
- Ambulance: South East Coast
- UK Parliament: Godalming and Ash

Shackleford is a village and civil parish in the Borough of Guildford, Surrey, England centred to the west of the A3 between Guildford and Petersfield 32 miles (51 km) southwest of London and 5.2 miles (8.4 km) southwest of Guildford. Shackleford includes the localities of Eashing, Hurtmore, Norney and Gatwick.

== History ==
The village does not appear in the Domesday Book of 1086; however, Hurtmore manor in the east of the parish and Rodsall manor, just to the west of the parish, a far-south part of Puttenham, do appear. The name first appears in 1220, as Sakelesford, and appears in a variety of mostly quite minor variants thereafter. The second element, -ford, is self-explanatory, but the etymology of the "Shackle-" element is uncertain. One possibility is that it is from Old English sceacol 'a shackle', perhaps with reference to a chain used to aid in crossing the river. Alternatively, there may have been an unattested Old English adjective *sceacol 'shaky, loose' from the stem of the Old English verb sceacan 'to shake', perhaps with reference to the bed of the river. It has also been suggested that the element might derive from an unattested Old English noun akin to Old High German scahho 'strip or tongue of land' or to Old Norse skekill as in útskekill 'the outskirts of a field', but there is nothing in the local topography pointing to such meanings. Whatever the etymology, in 1349 a John de Shackleford was one of three persons enfeoffed of a nearby manor; his surname, which at that relatively late date was most likely hereditary, doubtless referred to the Surrey village.

Hall Place (see landmarks) was a large house of Richard Wyatt (Note: A prominent member of the Carpenters' Company, one of the City's Livery Companies), who built the Mead Row Almshouses in 1619, before Hall Place was rebuilt in the 19th century. For a time the estate office was used as an inn, known as the Cyder House. Hall Place was acquired by Mr. William Edgar Horne, who turned it into a modern mansion. With gardens designed by Gertrude Jekyll, in the 1940s it was sold and converted into what became Aldro School. Its panelling and overmantel of the dining-room came from the Cock Tavern in Fleet Street, London; its gallery railings in the hall came from the Old Banqueting Hall at Whitehall Palace. Meanwhile, Hurtmore Manor was held by Sir Edward More of Odiham who before his death in 1623 left this to his daughter and her husband Sir William Staunton, recusant convict, and stating he should have the house free of rent for life – the manor was sold by later relatives to executors of Simon Bennett of Calverton, one of the daughters of whom married James Cecil, 4th Earl of Salisbury (when still styled by the courtesy title Viscount Cranborne) and his son James Cecil, 5th Earl of Salisbury inherited the share of the two Bennett daughters; his grandson James Cecil, 1st Marquess of Salisbury sold the estate with much later belonging to the Richardson, Keen and Frankland families.

Many of the houses that still stand today were built in the 18th century, although there was a further expansion of the village when the railway line was constructed between London and Portsmouth during the mid 19th century, passing through nearby Godalming and Farncombe. At the centre of the village are sixteen listed buildings and one listed set of walls – Aldro School garden walls. St Mary's Church was built in 1865, designed by Sir George Gilbert Scott. It stands in the outskirts of the Shackleford village centre at a nearby crossroads in the woodland locality of Norney.

== Geography ==
Most of the parish consists of relative uplands to the Wey Valley; elevations vary between 102 m AOD in the north and west to 45m AOD at a weir marking the boundary with Godalming town council.

Shackleford is centred 32 miles (51 km) southwest of London and 5.2 miles (8.4 km) southwest of Guildford.

=== Soil ===
Shackleford's soil is of two types. An arc of wet heath soil is to the south-east, south, south-west, west and north-west of the village centre, covering all of Norney and Gatwick. This is the same type of heath as in Esher, Oxshott, Weybridge, Wisley, all around Woking, Brookwood, Deepcut, Pirbright, Frimley, Lightwater, Camberley, Chobham Common, Virginia Water and Ottershaw is "naturally wet, very acid sandy and loamy soil" which is just 1.9% of English soil and 0.2% of Welsh soil, which gives rise to pines and coniferous landscapes, such as pioneered at Wentworth and Foxhills estate (now spa, hotel, restaurant and golf club) by pro-American Independence statesman Charles James Fox. Consequently, Malden summarised Shackleford's visual landscape in 1911 "The hamlet of Shackleford contains some old cottages and farm buildings and many new houses in very beautiful scenery." In A Topographical Dictionary of England, published by Samuel Lewis in 1848, it is stated that "Eashing House is situated on a commanding brow overlooking the beautiful valley of Eashing". The remainder of the soil is in common with Godalming, "free draining slightly acid loamy" and is the dominant type in the centre of Shackleford, as well as throughout Eashing and Hurtmore.

== Localities ==
=== Eashing ===
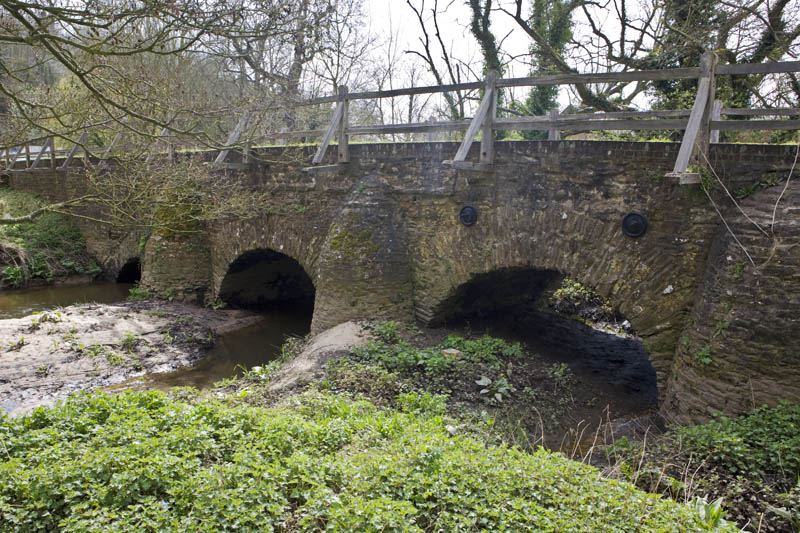
On the Wey. Eashing mediaeval double bridge built by monks from Waverley Abbey

Eashing is a hamlet 1.5 miles (2.4 km) south-east of Shackleford on the River Wey, 1.2 miles (1.9 km) west of Godalming, and was part of the Hundred of Godalming; in the Anglo-Saxon era it was a significant place and is one of the burhs listed in the Burghal Hidage of Alfred the Great.

Eashing is now administered by Guildford Borough Council and is divided into Upper Eashing on top of the steep south-east bank and Lower Eashing set low, immediately below the A3 road embankment on the north-west bank. Lower Eashing has an ancient bridge over the River Wey which was constructed in the 14th century by monks from Waverley Abbey. Twenty buildings strewn across both parts are now listed buildings. Eashing also has two large-unit business parks, The Granary and The Wharf, which are on a large island accessed by a bridge behind the Stag public house and the Mill.

Noel Fitzpatrick's veterinary practice is located at Eashing, and has been seen in television programmes including The Bionic Vet.

=== Hurtmore ===
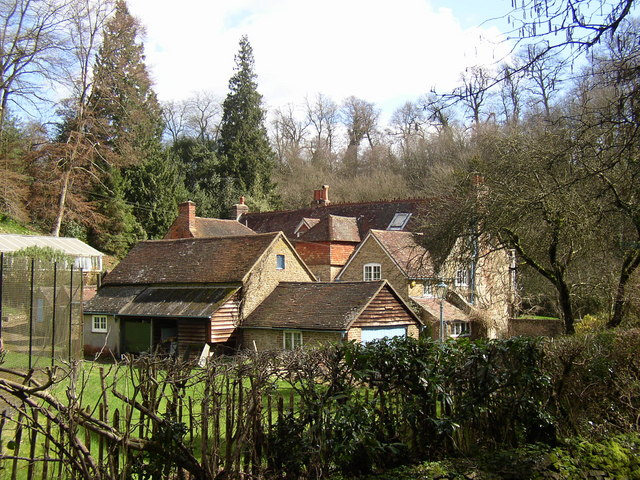
Part of Hurtmore

Hurtmore is a settlement and locality roughly east of Shackleford, adjoining hilly developed parts of the outskirts of Godalming such as Charterhouse Hill and Prior's Field (which is part of the village of Compton). On Charterhouse Hill, which comes under Godalming, is a well known public school (independent). Charterhouse School. The name is derived from the word hurt ('hart'/deer) and mere ('pond'), which still exists in a rather poor state at Hurtmore Bottom.

A hot air balloon provider, Reach 4 The Sky, operates flights from the land behind the pub cottages, historically used as a chalk quarry. An 18-hole golf course with clubhouse is just off the next to the public house, The Squirrel, which is beside the A3 and has a focus on serving food while providing a few guest rooms. It closed for a period from 28 November 2008 to 17 July 2009 and was refurbished before reopening under new management.

=== Norney ===
Six listed buildings are spread about among the no more than 30 private residences, most with private woods. These are: The Lodge, The Church of St Mary, Norney Grange, The Lodge to Norney Grange, Norney Farmhouse and Norney Old House which is a Tudor period cottage with extensions. One of these, Norney Grange is Grade II* listed, (described in Landmarks, below).

=== Gatwick ===
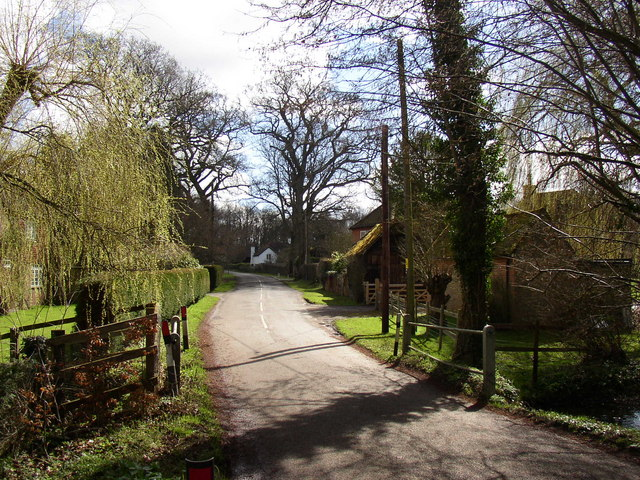
Gatwick, Shackleford

Nestled among fir and beech plantations is a small neighbourhood consisting of 15 houses named Gatwick (not to be confused with the former hamlet in Reigate and Banstead, or the airport of the same name), parts of which overlook part of the expanse of placid, acid heath to the northwest, the Surrey Wildlife Trust managed Puttenham & Crooksbury Commons.

Its coordinates are 51°11′45″N 0°41′32″W (SU 916 450).

== Landmarks ==
=== Norney Grange ===
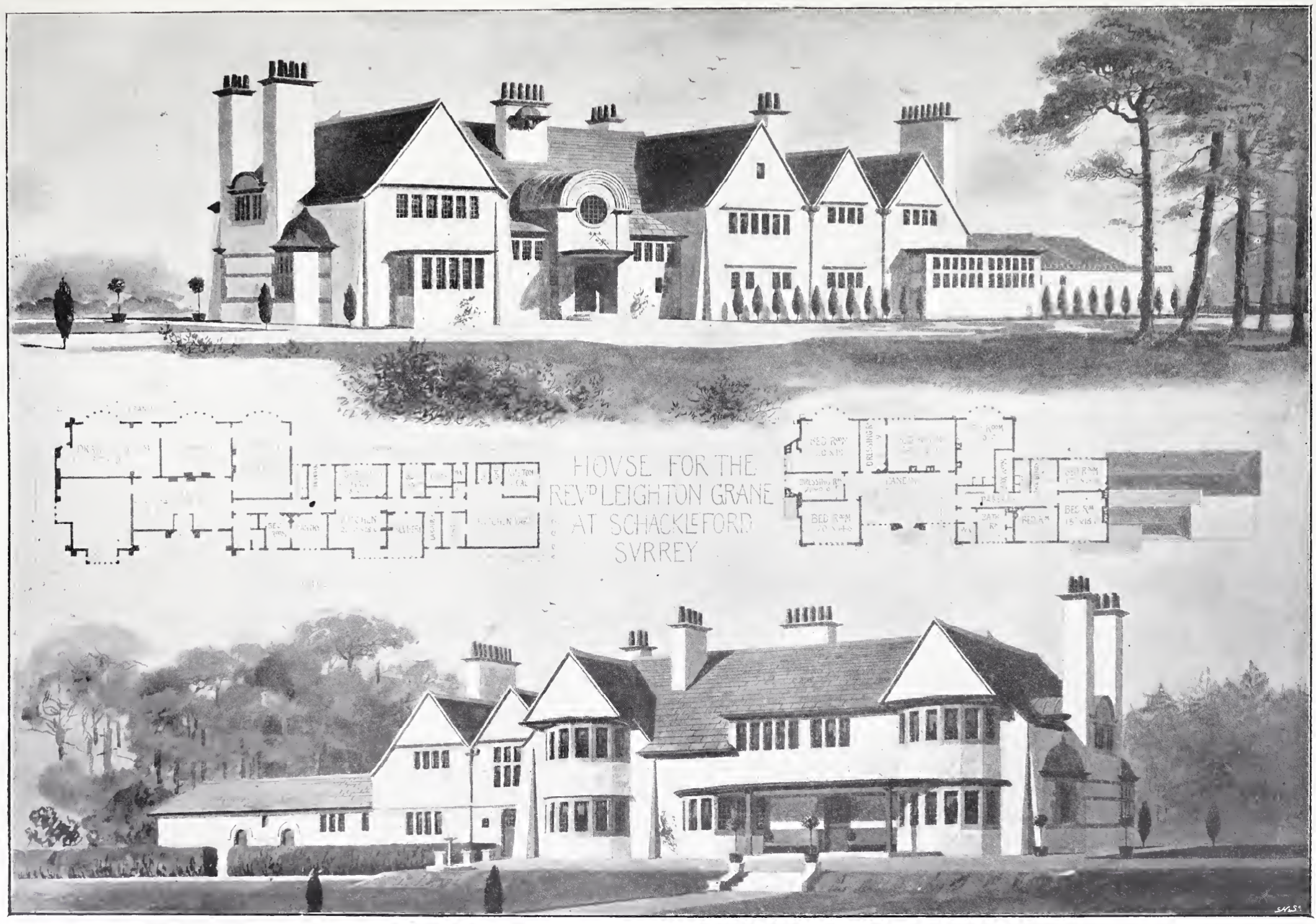
Norney Grange

Norney Grange, designed by Charles Voysey, is the highest architecturally graded listed building in the Norney part of the parish, a rectangular late 1897-1903 built, roughcast stone home with yellow limestone dressings. Its interior is just as remarkable as its exterior, with among many carved features, a green marble chimney breast in end room to left and a half-dome ceiling with gallery landing to the rear. The house has featured prominently in film and on television, such as in the 2021 film The Dig, standing in as Edith Pretty's house at Sutton Hoo, Suffolk.

=== Hall Place / Aldro School ===
William de Shackleford probably owned Hall Place – a substantial manor house which existed here in the 15th century. Its estate covered many acres, including much of today's village.

Hall Place was demolished in 1797 and a new mansion was built on the site in the late 19th century. During the Second World War this building and much of its grounds were bought by Aldro School, which relocated there from Eastbourne.

=== Mitchen Hall ===
To the south-west is a late 17th-century two-storey galleted coursed sandstone home with red brick dressings facing its round front drive, which is listed.

=== Anglo-Saxon fortified village and bridge ===
During the reign of King Alfred the Great an Anglo-Saxon burh was constructed at Upper Eashing as a defensive point to resist Viking attacks. Both this and the 13th-century Eashing Bridge (in two parts) are Scheduled Ancient Monuments

The bridge is officially listed as "probably built by the monks of Waverley Abbey"; it is made of local rubble stone with thin slabs of Bargate stone set in mortar to form voussoirs over the arches. Its top is of 18th-century bricks with no parapet but instead for safety, twentieth-century wooden posts and railings. The east span consists of three arches and the west four. Pointed cutwaters to upstream side and rounded cutwaters, "very rare", to downstream side.

== Demography and housing ==
2011 Census Homes
Output area	Detached	Semi-detached	Terraced	Flats and apartments	Caravans/temporary/mobile homes	shared between households
(Civil Parish)	150	77	27	14	0	0

The average level of accommodation in the region composed of detached houses was 28%, the average that was apartments was 22.6%.

2011 Census Key Statistics
Output area	Population	Households	% Owned outright	% Owned with a loan	hectares
(Civil Parish)	770	268	35.1%	35.8%	803

The proportion of households (a sizeable minority of which share buildings) in the civil parish who owned their home outright compares to the regional average of 35.1%. The proportion who owned their home with a loan compares to the regional average of 32.5%. The remaining % is made up of rented dwellings (plus a negligible % of households living rent-free). The population has increased from 740 in the 2001 census.

== Transport ==
=== Public transport ===
A bus services operates in Hurtmore through the village taking people into the nearby town of Godalming.

The main line between London Waterloo and Portsmouth Harbour is accessible to the east at Farncombe, Godalming railway station and Godalming railway station is a similar distance (of about 2 miles (3.2 km) from nearer parts of Shackleford) in an ESE direction and has more trains per hour.

=== Roads ===
An A3 intersection to local roads is directly between Norney and Hurtmore, which is one of three which can be used to access the town of Godalming. Eashing can be accessed by bridleway and footpath under the A3 or from the A3 itself, not by local roads to the northwest.

== Notable residents ==
- Ashley Cole, English former footballer
- Cheryl Cole, singer
- Sir Edgar Horne, Conservative Member of Parliament
- Sir Julian Huxley, evolutionary biologist, lived in Shackleford as a child
- Sir David Orr, Chairman of Unilever
- Sir David Randall Pye, Provost of University College London

== See also ==
- List of places of worship in Guildford (borough)

== Notes and references ==
Notes
