= Calverton Historic District =

Historic district in Virginia, United States

- U.S. National Register of Historic Places
- U.S. Historic district
- Virginia Landmarks Register
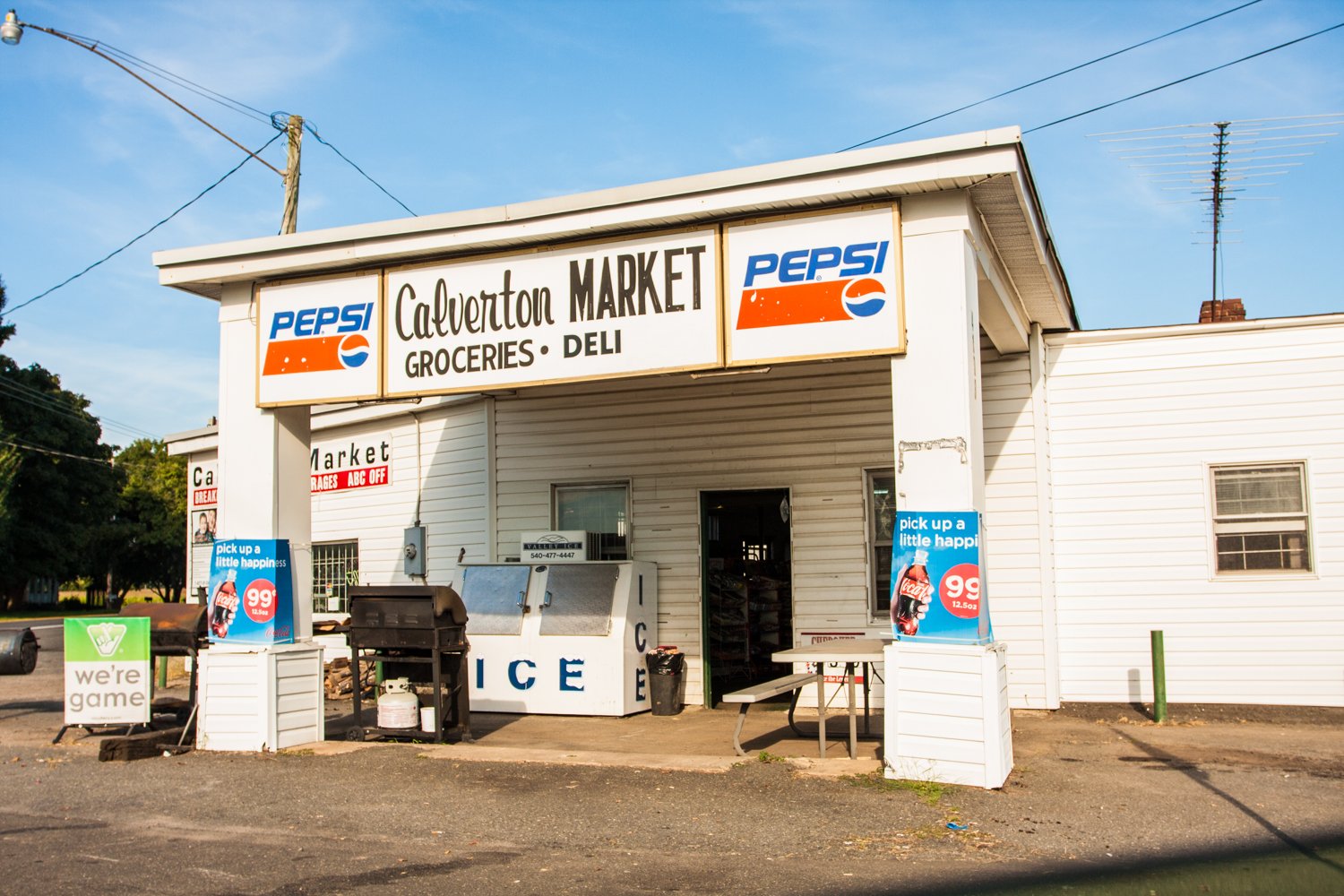
- Calverton Market, at Catlett and Bristersburg Rds.

- Location within Northern Virginia Location within Virginia Location within the United States
- Location: Area including parts of Bristersburg and Catlett Rds., Calverton, Virginia
- Coordinates: 38°37′35″N 77°40′14″W
- Area: 51 acres (21 ha)
- Built: 1852
- Architectural style: Queen Anne, Late Victorian
- NRHP reference No.: 10000542
- VLR No.: 030-5165

Significant dates
- Added to NRHP: August 12, 2010
- Designated VLR: December 17, 2009

Calverton Historic District is a national historic district located at Calverton, Fauquier County, Virginia. It encompasses 69 contributing buildings and 2 contributing structures in the rural crossroads village of Calverton. They include three dwellings, a church, a school, and three stores. Notable buildings include a large farmstead, multiple dwellings, several commercial buildings, Wesleyan Methodist Church, the former high school now converted into apartments, and the old abandoned post office building.

It was listed on the National Register of Historic Places in 2010.

== Gallery ==
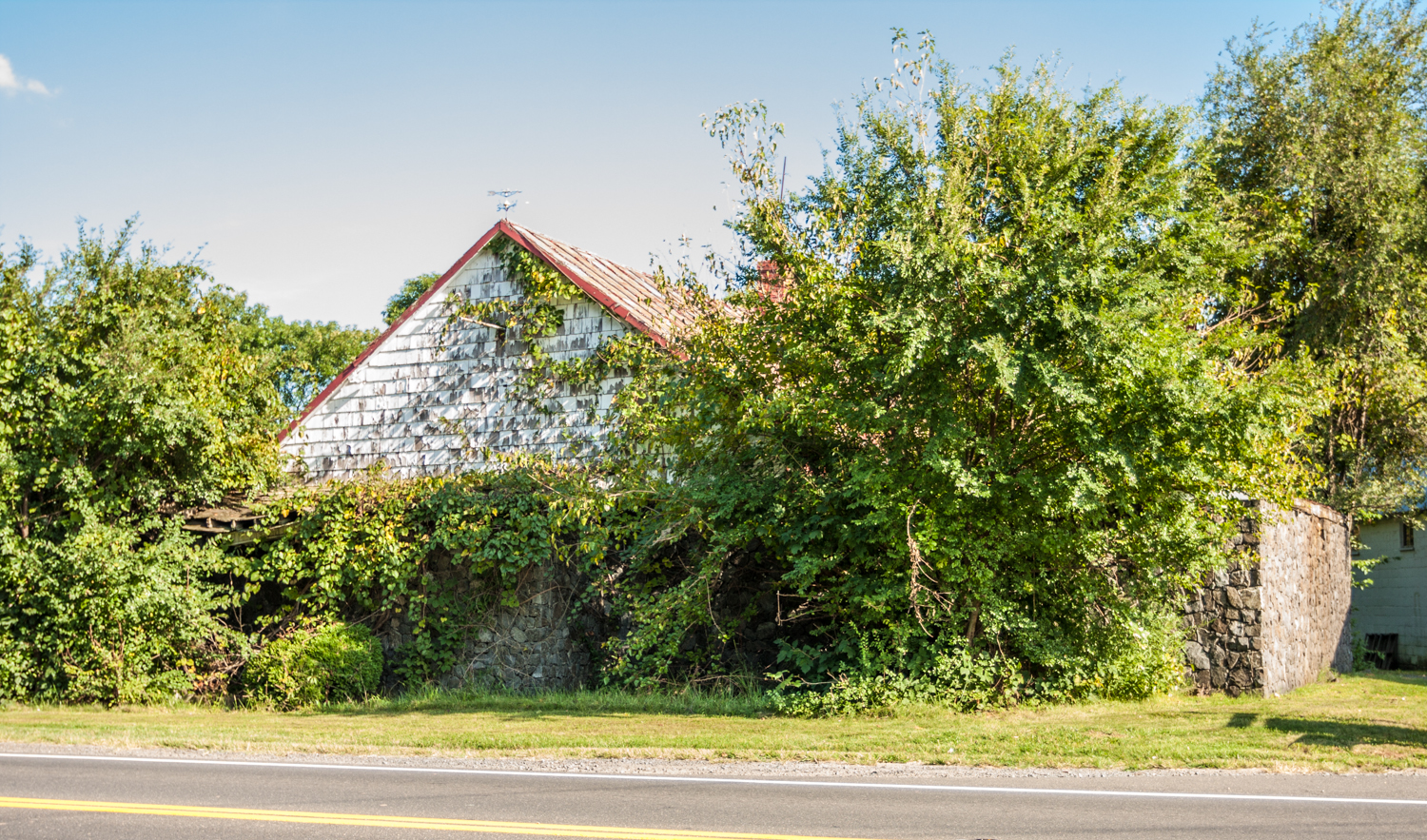
Traveler's Inn Restaurant

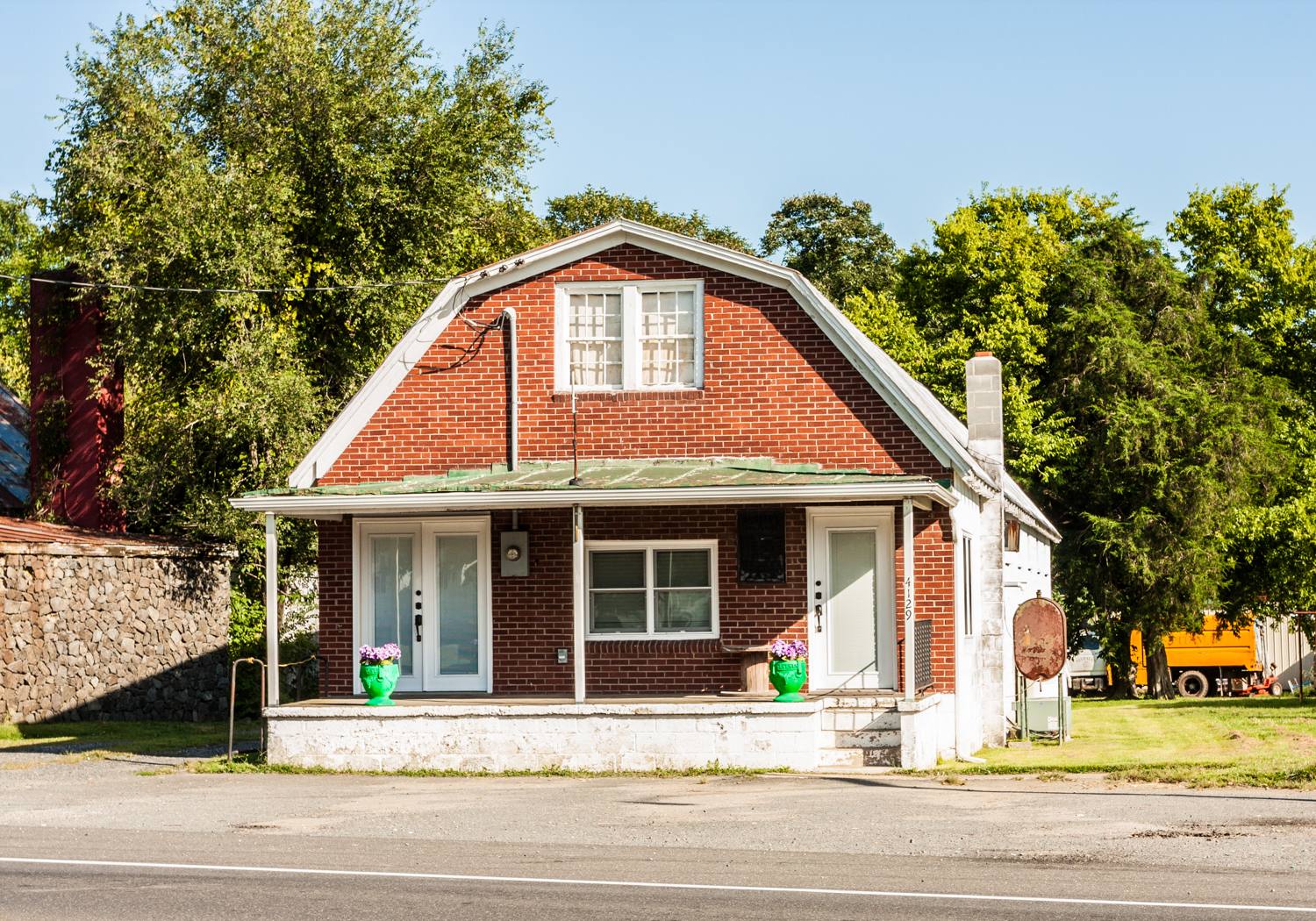
Calverton Supply

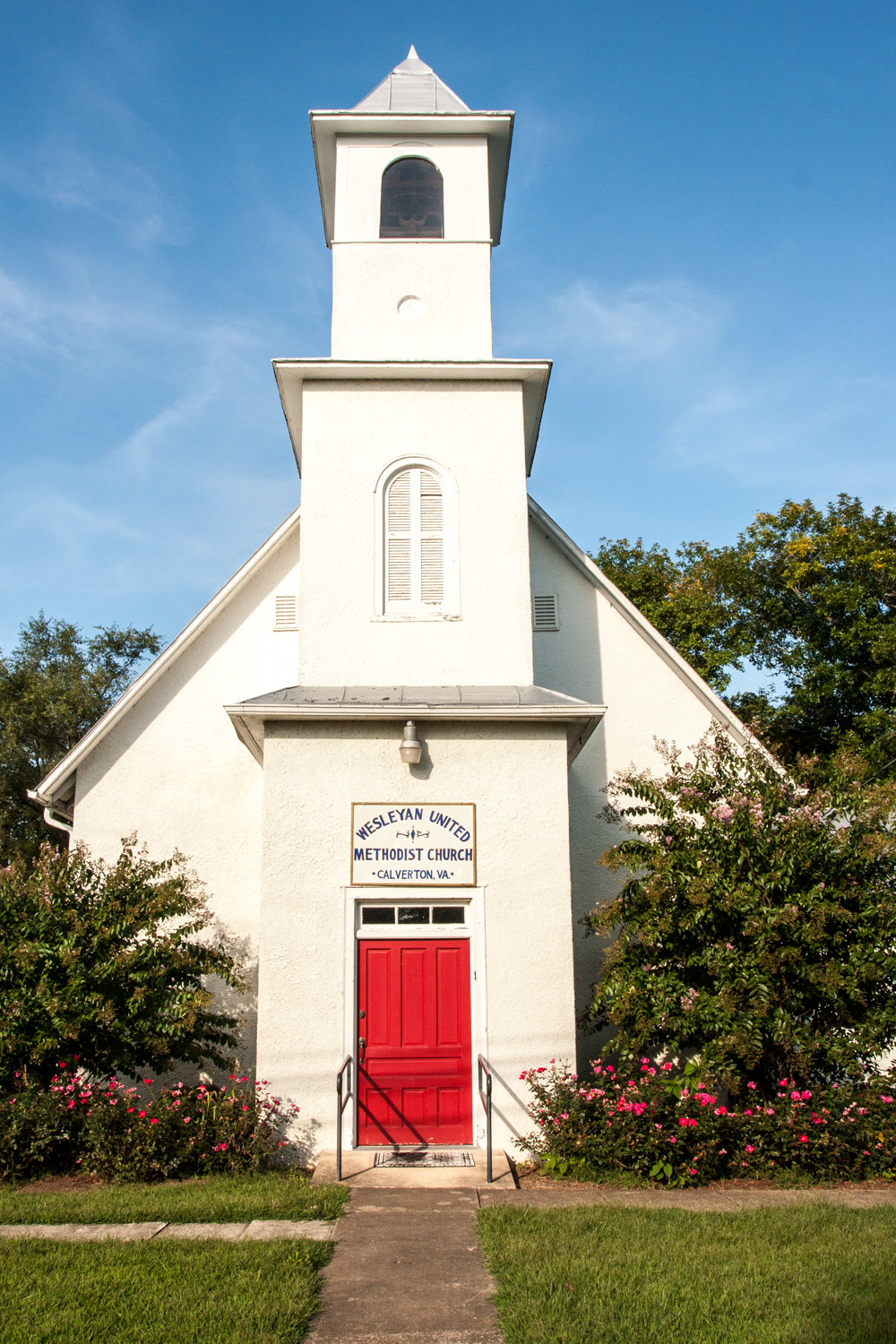
Wesleyan UMC

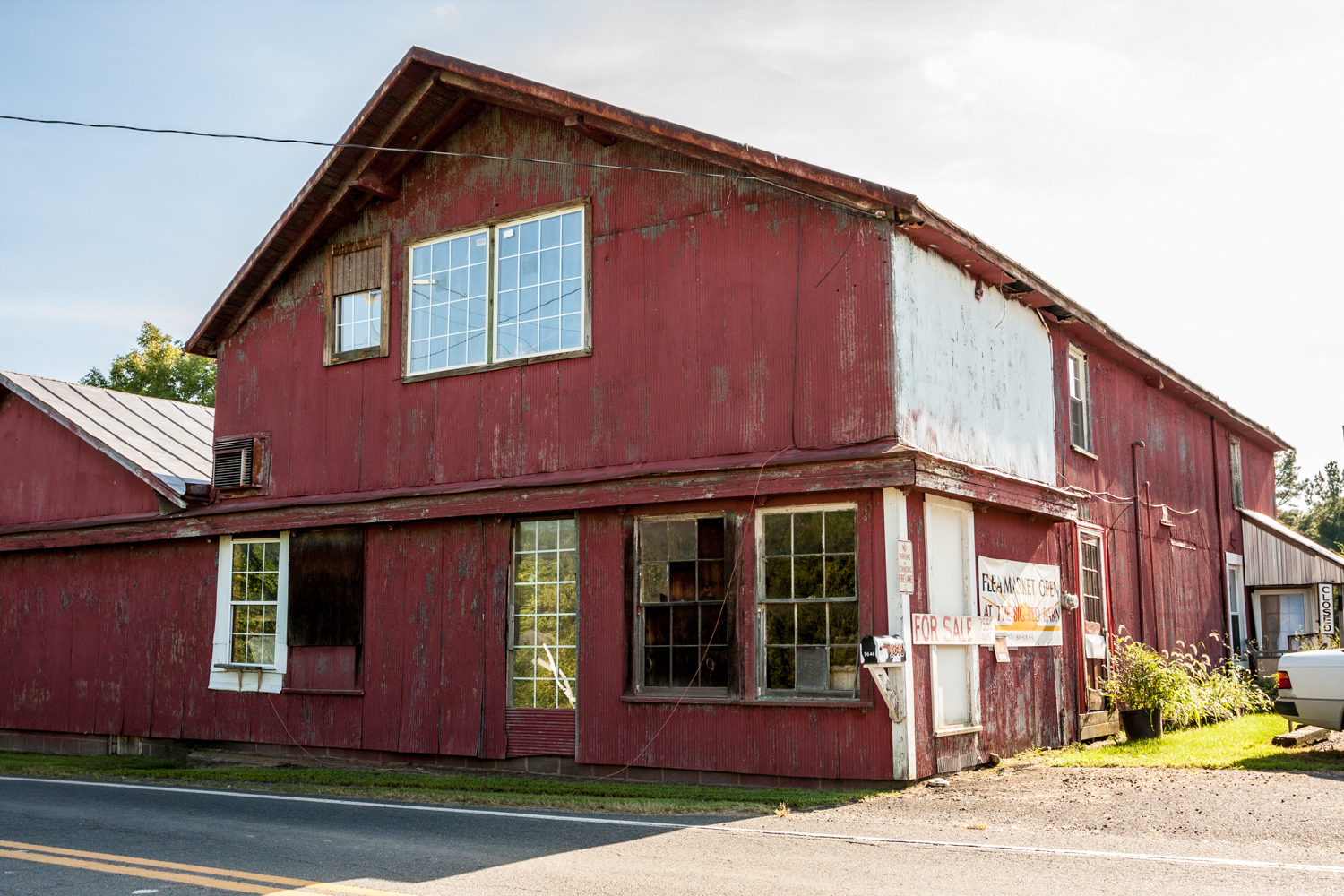
Flea Market, formerly Spicer's Car Dealership and Motor Co.

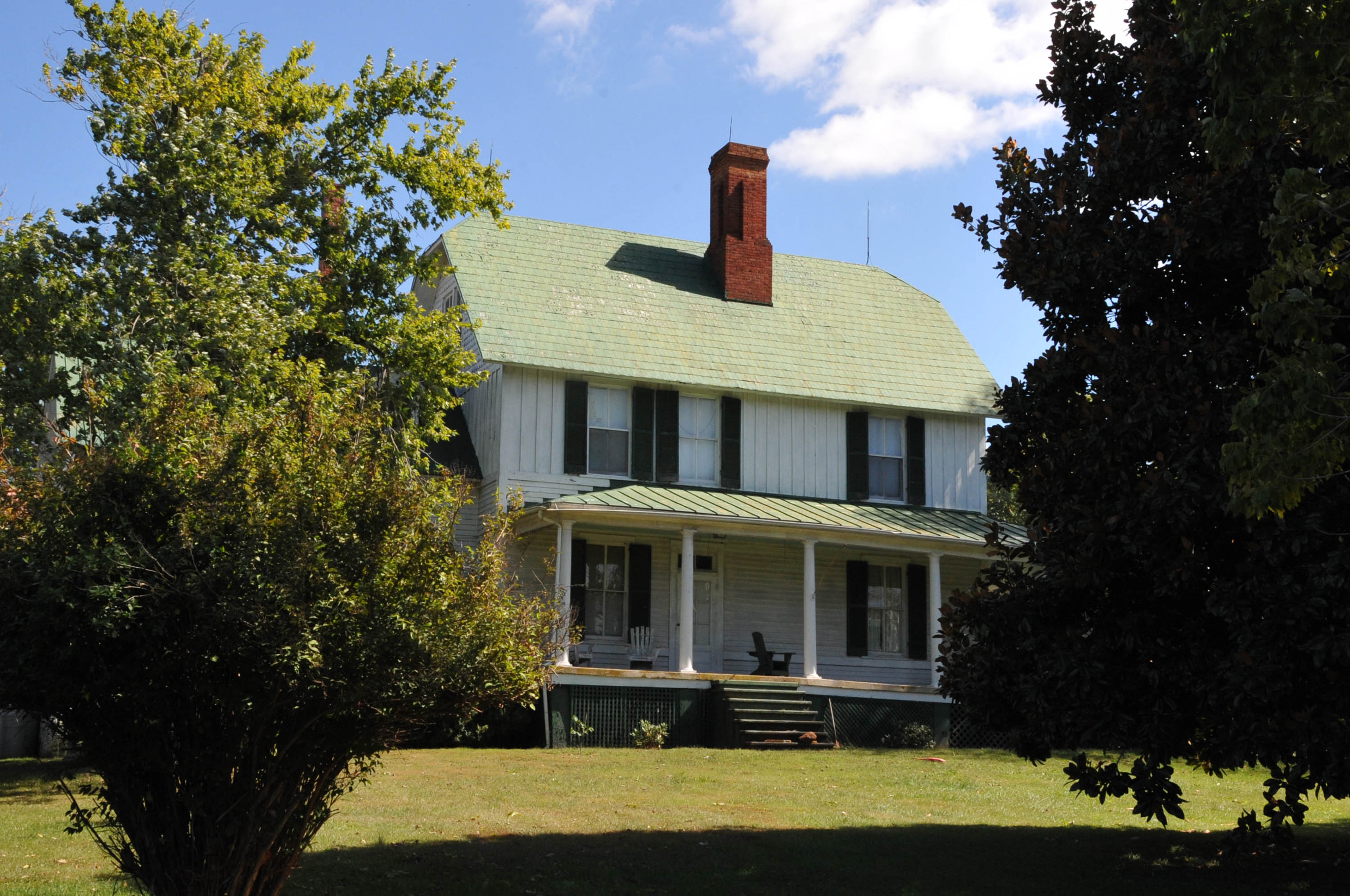
"Maple Hill"

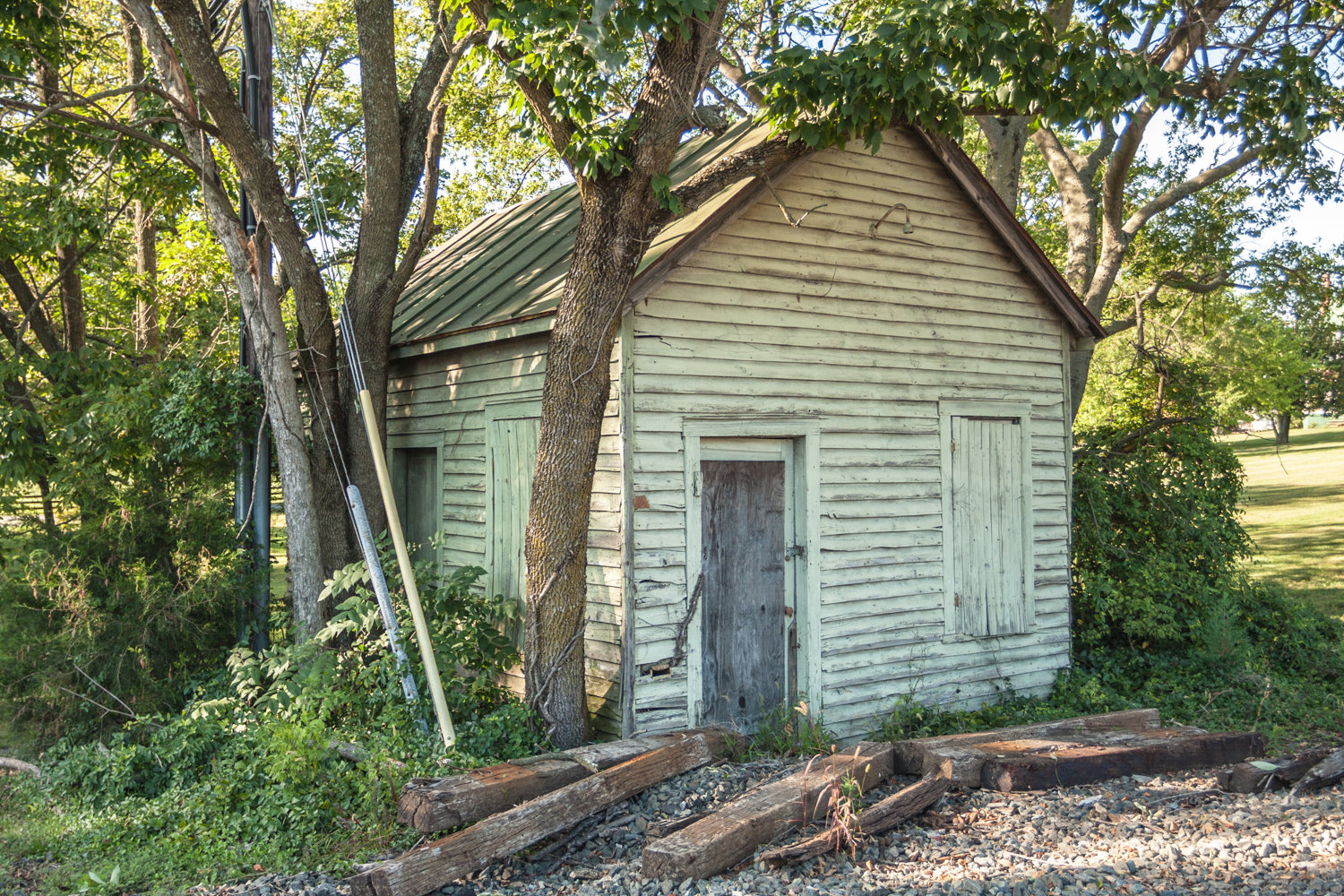
Old Post Office on Maple Hill Property
