= River Ock, Surrey =

River in Surrey, England

Coordinates: 51°11′18″N 0°37′02″W

Ock
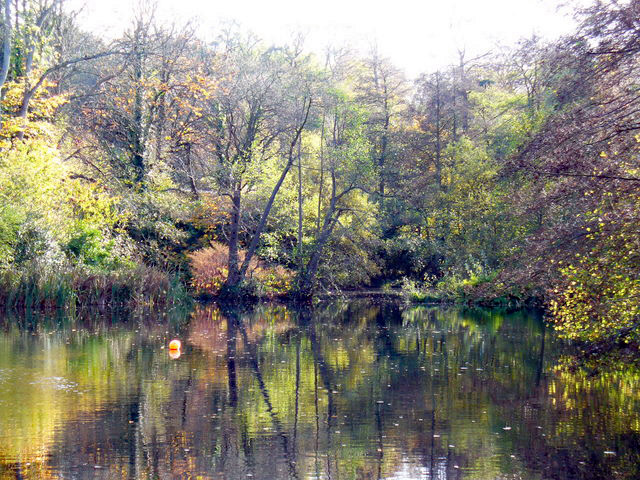
- Millpond on the Ock near Great Enton

- Location of mouth

Location
- Country: England
- County: Surrey
- District: Waverley

Physical characteristics
- Source
  - location: various in Waverley (borough), Surrey
- Mouth: River Wey
  - location: Godalming
- Length: 7.5 km (4.7 mi)
- Basin size: 26.4 km^{2} (10.2 sq mi)

Basin features
- River system: Wey catchment
- Tributaries
  - left: indistinct (long headwaters in local terms being unnamed)
  - right: Busbridge stream and indistinct number (long headwaters in local terms being unnamed)

The River Ock is a tributary of the River Wey in Surrey, England.

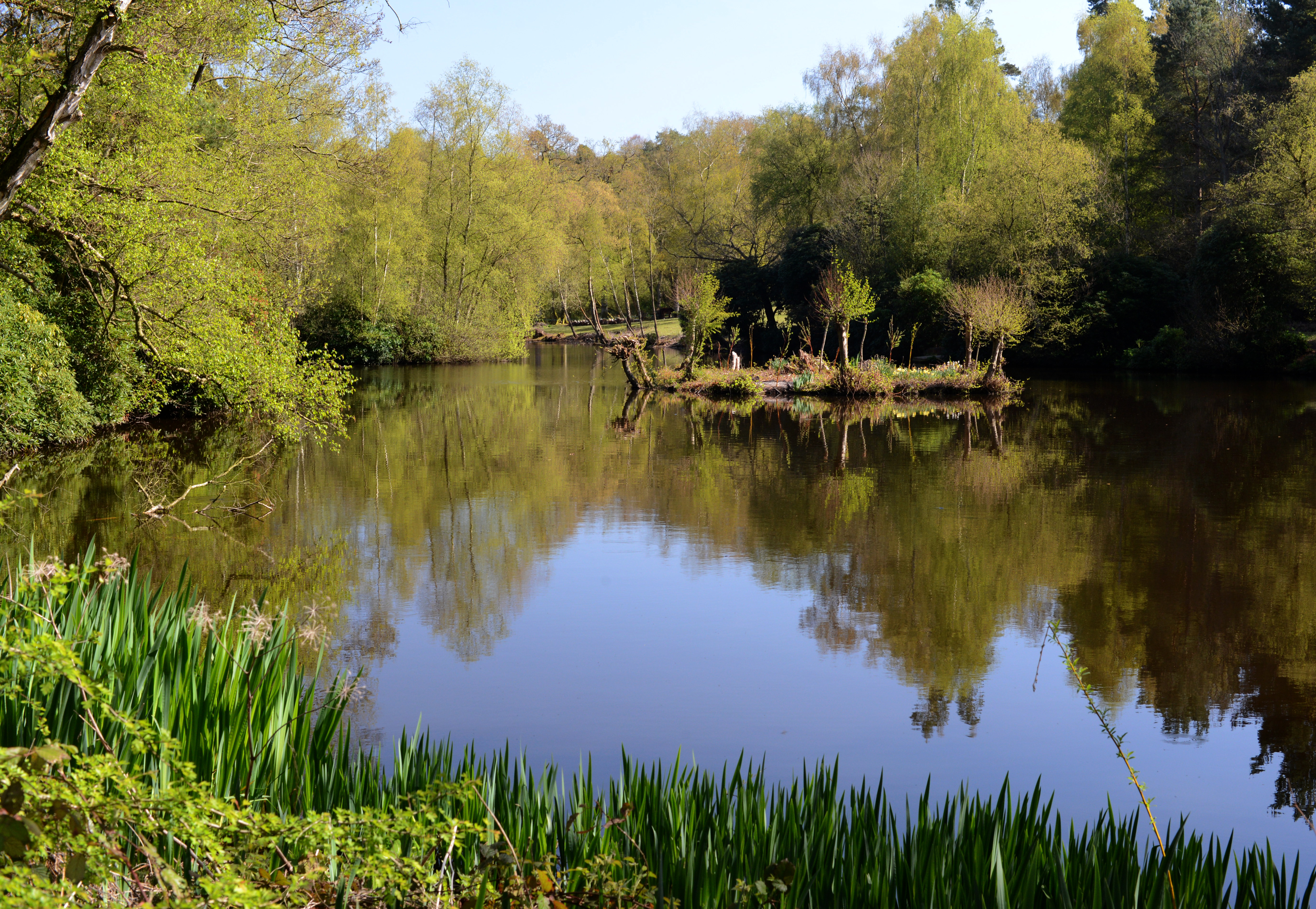
A Spring view of Sweetwater Pond Witley

== Course ==
The river has two great sources in the west of Hambledon and two similar sources in the east of the parish of Witley. The coalescence is north of a zone of gently north-sloping land forming Wheelerstreet, Enton Green and the little manor of Tuesley. For centuries the latter comprised a very modest house and farmstead, dwarfed by the adjacent Busbridge Park, the stream of which drains Busbridge Lakes, the former mid and lower fish ponds, the upper one having been drained on becoming part of that stream.

The resulting Ock passes through Ockford, sometimes considered the east of Ockford Ridge, then parts of Godalming, before joining the Wey in the town centre.

The Portsmouth Main Line railway follows much of the course.

== Watermills ==
The Old Mill in Godalming, originally known as Hatch Mill, made use of the force and speed of the multi-hill-draining river. Rake Mill at Witley, a former fulling mill, was used by the artist Neville Lytton as a studio. The building, along with most of Lytton's sketches and paintings, was destroyed by a fire in 1902. Other mills on the Ock were a tannery in Godalming, a corn mill at Enton and a flour mill at Ockford.

== Water quality ==
The Environment Agency measure water quality of the rivers in England. Each is given an overall ecological status, which may be one of five levels: high, good, moderate, poor and bad. There are several components that are used to determine this, including biological status, which looks at the quantity and varieties of invertebrates, angiosperms and fish. Chemical status, which compares the concentrations of various chemicals against known safe concentrations, is rated good or fail.

The water quality of the Ock was as follows in 2019:

Section	Ecological Status	Chemical Status	Overall Status	Length	Catchment	Channel
River Ock	Bad	Fail	Bad	7.51 km (4.67 mi)	26.394 km^{2} (10.191 sq mi)	

== See also ==
- River Ock mills
