= Calvert School (disambiguation) =

Calvert School is a kindergarten through 8th grade co-ed school for students in Baltimore, Maryland, with a homeschooling division.

Calvert School may also refer to:

- Calvert Elementary School, one of 36 public primary schools in the Lincoln Public Schools school district of Lincoln, Nebraska, USA
- Calvert Hall College High School, a Catholic preparatory high school for boys located in Towson, Maryland, USA
- Calvert High School (Prince Frederick, Maryland), is a public high school in Prince Federick, Calvert County, Maryland
- Calvert High School (Tiffin, Ohio), a private, Catholic high school in Tiffin, Ohio
- Calvert High School (Texas), a public high school in Calvert, Texas
- Durham Academy, a private school in Durham, North Carolina that was previously named Calvert School

== See also ==
- Calvert (disambiguation)
