= Calverton, Virginia =

- Census-designated place
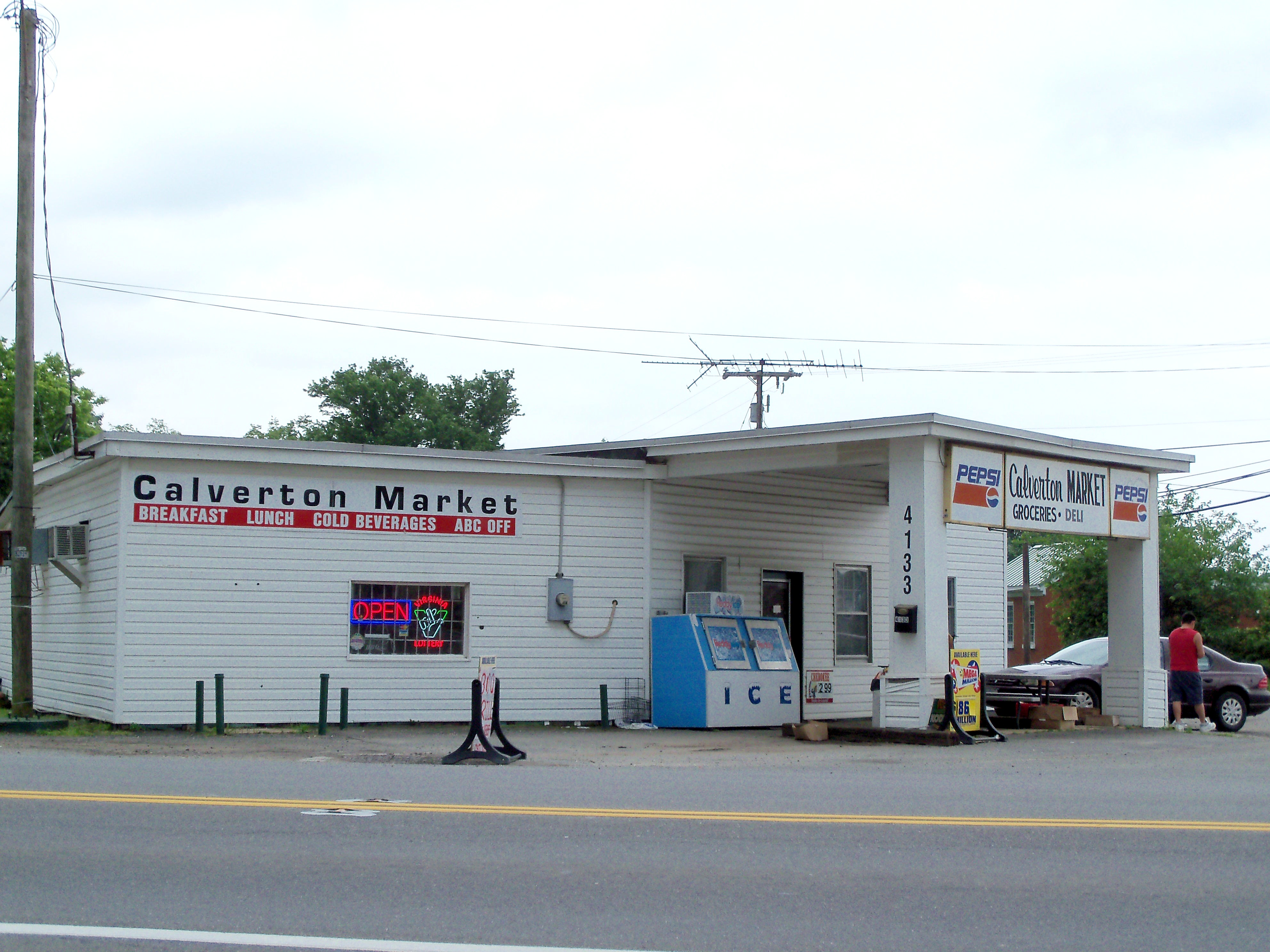
- Calverton Market

- Location within Northern Virginia Location within Virginia Location within the United States
- Coordinates: 38°37′55″N 77°40′12″W
- Country: United States
- State: Virginia
- County: Fauquier

Area
  - Total: 4.61 sq mi (11.95 km^{2})
  - Land: 4.59 sq mi (11.88 km^{2})
  - Water: 0.027 sq mi (0.07 km^{2})
- Elevation: 259 ft (79 m)

Population (2010)
  - Total: 239
  - Density: 52/sq mi (20.1/km^{2})
- Time zone: UTC−5 (Eastern (EST))
  - Summer (DST): UTC−4 (EDT)
- ZIP code: 20138
- FIPS code: 51-12264
- GNIS feature ID: 1492694

Calverton is a census-designated place (CDP) in Fauquier County, Virginia, United States. As of the 2020 census, Calverton had a population of 279. The village runs along Virginia State Route 28 and its crossroad, Bristersburg Road. Calverton has a Southern States store, a small country store, and post office. Its ZIP code is 20138.

The Calverton Historic District was listed on the National Register of Historic Places in 2010.

Calverton may have been named after Calvert County, Maryland. Gilbert Bastable's family moved to the Warrenton Junction area from Maryland between 1850 and 1860, and Bastable lived in Calvert County prior to returning to Virginia after the Civil War.

== Geography ==
Calverton is located in southeastern Fauquier County, between Catlett to the northeast and Midland to the southwest, all along Virginia Route 28. Warrenton, the county seat, is 10 miles (16 km) to the northwest via Casanova Road and Meetze Road.

According to the U.S. Census Bureau, the Calverton CDP has a total area of 4.61 square miles (11.95 km^{2}), of which 4.59 square miles (11.88 km^{2}) is land and 0.027 square miles (0.07 km^{2}), or 0.59%, is water. Owl Run flows through the center of Calverton; it is a tributary of Cedar Run, part of the Occoquan River watershed flowing to the Potomac River.

== Demographics ==
Historical population
Census	Pop.	Note	%±
2010	239		—
2020	279		16.7%
U.S. Decennial Census; 2010 2020

Calverton was first listed as a census designated place in the 2010 U.S. census.

== Sewage-related problems ==
The Fauquier County government's vision for Calverton is, "Calverton will be a small rural village centered within an agricultural community. It will be a livable community with a balance of residential and non-residential development surrounded by open space and preserved wildlife." The county established less ambitious goals for Calverton's growth due to the challenges it faced in trying to deal with failed and failing septic drain fields in Calverton by providing public sewers.
