= Calvert Street =

Calvert Street may refer to:

- Calvert Street (Baltimore), the northbound portion of Maryland Route 2 in northern Baltimore, Maryland
- Calvert Street (Washington, D.C.), a street in Washington, D.C.
