= Tuesley Manor =

House in Surrey, England

Coordinates: 51.16971°N 0.621941°W

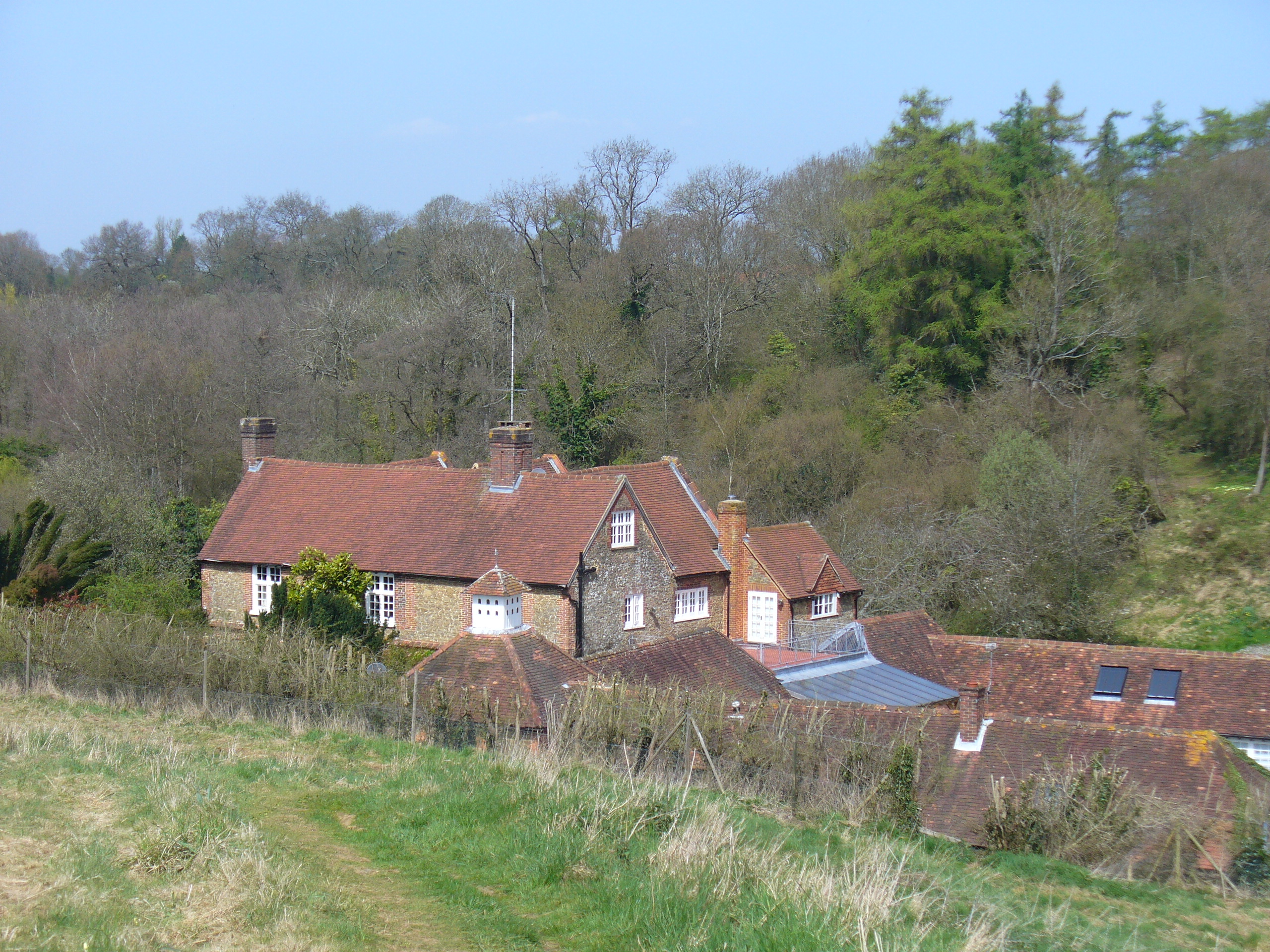
- Tuesley Manor in 2010
- Interactive map of Tuesley Manor
- Type: House
- Location: Munstead and Tuesley, near Godalming, Surrey

Listed Building – Grade II
- Official name: Tuesley Manor, Tuesley Lane
- Designated: 09-Mar-1960
- Reference no.: 1240206

Tuesley Manor is a Grade II listed house in the civil parish of Munstead and Tuesley, near Godalming, Surrey, England.

Tuesley Manor is Grade II listed, with parts dating back to the 15th century. Previously owned by Salisbury Cathedral, it was sold off by the Ecclesiastical Commissioners in 1846, and became home to Bronwen Pugh, Lady Astor, in 1966, after she moved there from Cliveden, following the death of her husband, William Astor, 3rd Viscount Astor. As of July 2023, it was listed for sale at £4.7 million.
