= Godalming Borough Hall =

Municipal building in Godalming, Surrey, England

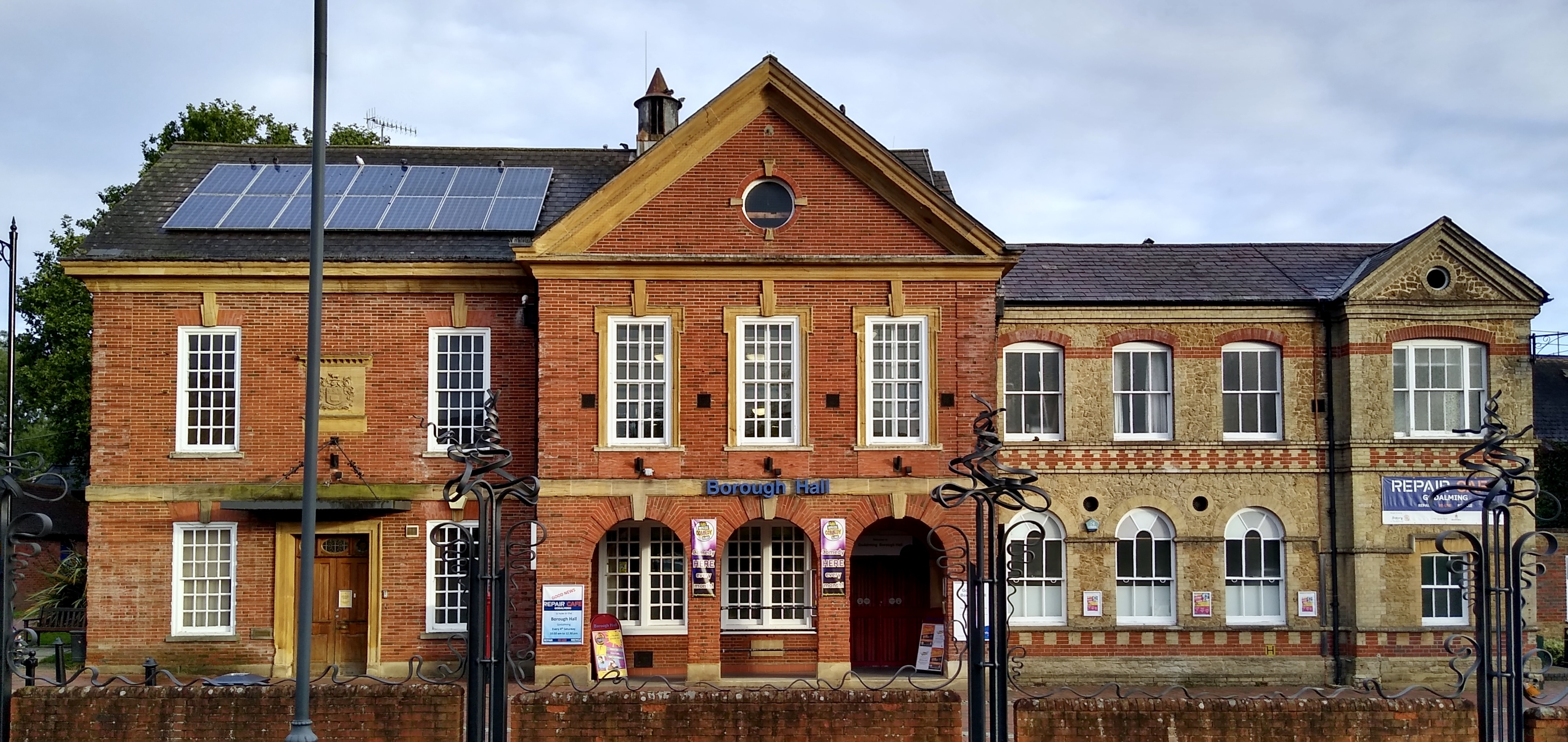
- Godalming Borough Hall

- Shown in Surrey
- 51.1869°N 0.6094°W
- Location: Bridge Street, Godalming

History
- Built: 1861

Site notes
- Architect: Henry Peak
- Architectural style: Neoclassical style

Godalming Borough Hall is a municipal building in Bridge Street in Godalming, a town in Surrey, England. The building was the meeting place of Godalming Town Council.

== History ==
The town of Godalming was incorporated as a borough by a charter issued in 1575 from Elizabeth I. The first municipal building in Godalming was an 18th-century market hall in the High Street which was used to accommodate French prisoners following the capture of Belle Île in June 1761. It was replaced by the current market hall, The Pepperpot, which was designed by John Perry in the neoclassical style, built by public subscription and completed in 1814. The borough was reformed with elected officials in accordance with the Municipal Corporations Act 1835.

After civic leaders decided that the assembly room in the Pepperpot was inadequate for public meetings, a public hall was erected in Bridge Street: it was designed by Henry Peak, built using brown rubble masonry and completed in 1861.

In May 1907 tenders were invited from contractors to extend the public hall in Bridge Street to the west to create new municipal buildings for the borough. The extension was built in red brick with stone dressings and the work was completed in 1908. The design of the enlarged structure involved an asymmetrical main frontage with ten bays facing onto Bridge Street; the central section of three bays, which slightly projected forward, featured arcading on the ground floor, three sash windows with stone surrounds on the first floor and a pediment above with an oculus in the tympanum. The left hand section featured, in the central bay, a doorway with a canopy on the ground floor and a panel containing the borough coat of arms on the first floor. The right hand section featured, in the end bay which slightly projected forward, a round headed doorway on the ground floor and a tri-part sash window on the first floor with a pediment above.

The building continued to serve as the meeting place of Godalming Borough Council for much of the 20th century, but ceased to be the local seat of government when Waverley Borough Council was formed with its headquarters in Guildford in 1974. Waverley Council moved to new council offices in The Burys just behind the borough hall in 1980. The borough hall subsequently served as the headquarters of Godalming Town Council, until 2021 when the council moved its offices to a converted shop at 107–109 High Street and its meetings to the Waverley council chamber at The Burys.

Works of art in the borough hall include a portrait by Godfrey Kneller of the locally-born sailor, Admiral Sir John Balchen, who became governor of the Greenwich Naval Hospital in March 1743.
