= USS Calvert =

USS Calvert may refer to the following ships operated by the United States Navy:

- Calvert (SP-2274), was a Maryland State Fisheries Force motor boat that served in World War I
- USS Calvert (AP-65), served in World War II
