= Calverton =

Calverton may refer to:

== Places ==
- Calverton, Milton Keynes, United Kingdom
- Calverton, Nottinghamshire, United Kingdom
- Calverton, Maryland, United States of America
- Calverton, New York, United States of America
- Calverton, Virginia, United States of America

== People ==
- V. F. Calverton (1900-1940), pen name of American writer and political activist George Goetz
