= The Pepperpot =

Municipal building in Godalming, Surrey, England

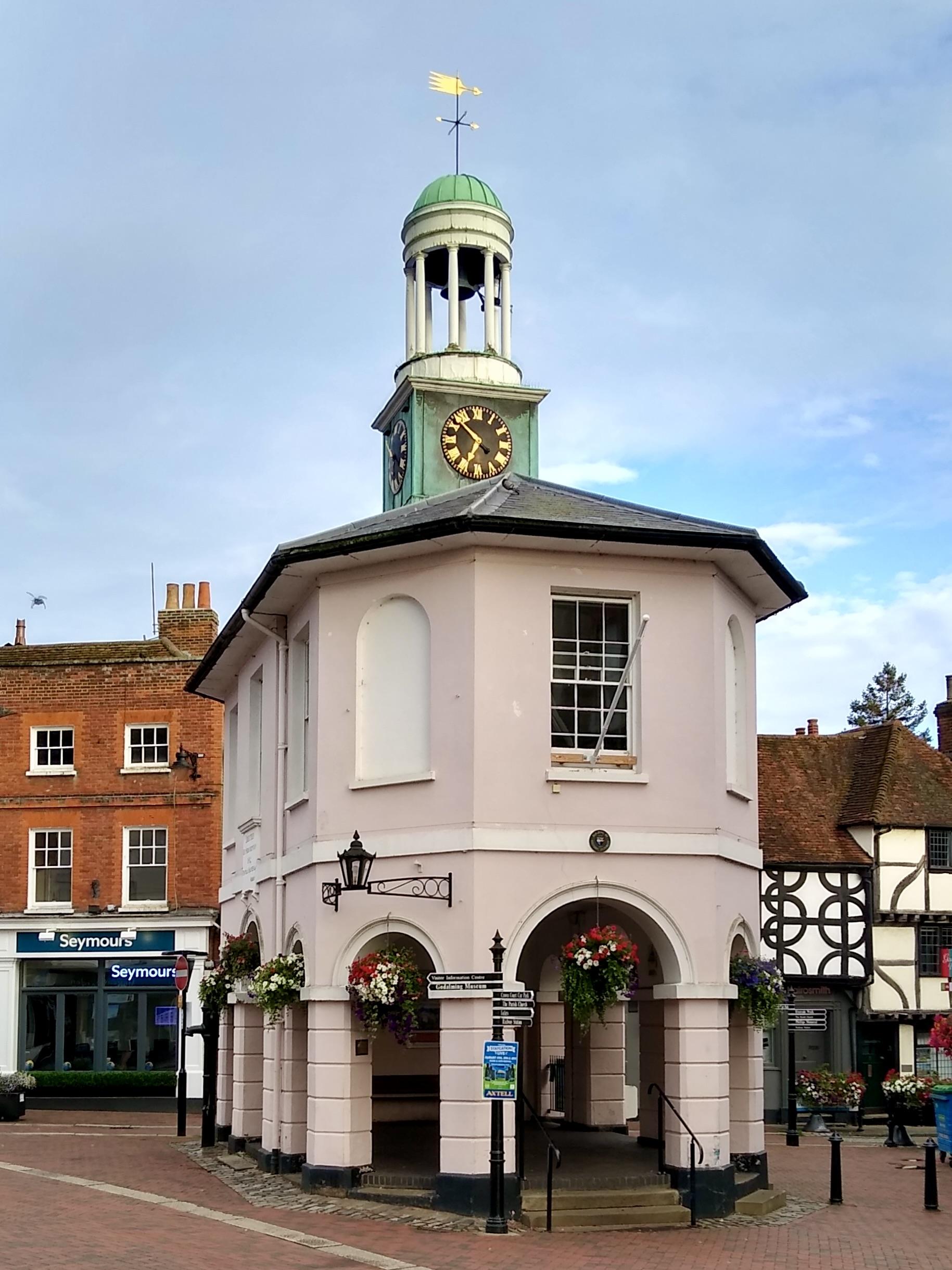
- The building in 2023

- Shown in Surrey
- 51.1855°N 0.6156°W
- Location: High Street, Godalming

History
- Built: 1814

Site notes
- Architect: John Perry
- Architectural style: Neoclassical style

Listed Building – Grade II
- Official name: The Pepperpot
- Designated: 18 December 1947
- Reference no.: 1044496

The Pepperpot is a historic building in the High Street in Godalming, a town in Surrey, in England. The building, which accommodates a meeting room on the first floor, is a Grade II listed building.

== History ==
The town of Godalming was incorporated as a borough by a charter issued in 1575 from Elizabeth I. The first municipal building in Godalming was an 18th-century market hall in the High Street which was used to accommodate French prisoners following the capture of Belle Île in June 1761. After the old market hall became dilapidated, the borough officials decided to commission a new building. The current building was designed by John Perry in the neoclassical style, built in brick with a stucco finish at a cost of £865 and was completed in 1814.

The design involved a symmetrical main frontage with three bays facing onto the High Street. It was arcaded on the ground floor, so that markets could be held, with an assembly room on the first floor. The end elevations were canted so as to give an octagonal shape. The first floor was fenestrated with sash windows although, at the rear, the windows were blind. At roof level there was a two-stage clock tower with clock faces in the first stage and a cupola for the second stage. The clock was manufactured by Richard Steadman.

The warden and other officials of the borough, who had met in the room on the first floor, were replaced by elected officials in accordance with the Municipal Corporations Act 1835. The building soon proved too small for public meetings, and in 1861, a public hall was constructed on Bridge Street, which was later extended to form Godalming Borough Hall.

Meanwhile, at the Pepperpot, a new cantilevered stair tower was added in the 1890s, and the room on the first floor was used to accommodate the Godalming Museum from 1921. The building was grade II listed in 1947. The museum remained on the first floor until 1987, when it moved to a larger building on the south side of the High Street. The room on the first floor subsequently served as a meeting room, while the ground floor continued to provide space for a greengrocer's stall twice a week.

The architectural historian, Nikolaus Pevsner, described the Pepperpot as "an admirable public building for a small town", the horticulturalist, Gertrude Jekyll, described it as "the latest building in Godalming which has that precious quality of character", while the guidebook author, Oliver Mason, described it as a "much needed focal point" for the town.
