= Bronwen Astor, Viscountess Astor =

English fashion model and psychotherapist (1930–2017)

The Right Honourable The Viscountess Astor
- Bronwen with her husband, William Astor, 3rd Viscount Astor, on their wedding day

Personal details
- Born: Janet Bronwen Alun Pugh; 6 June 1930 London, England
- Died: 28 December 2017 (aged 87)
- Spouse: William Astor, 3rd Viscount Astor (m. 1960; died 1966)
- Children: 2
- Parents: Sir Alun Pugh (father); Kathleen Goodyear (mother)
- Occupation: Fashion model; psychotherapist

Janet Bronwen Astor, Viscountess Astor (born Janet Bronwen Alun Pugh; 6 June 1930 – 28 December 2017) was an English fashion model and psychotherapist. She was muse to the couturier Pierre Balmain, who called her one of the most beautiful women he had ever met.

== Early life ==
Born in London, Janet (generally known by her middle name, Bronwen) was raised in Hampstead, which was then in the county of Middlesex. After the sudden death of a friend in 1951, she embarked on an inner journey of self-discovery culminating in 1959 in a profound mystical experience.

== Career ==
Before her marriage, Bronwen had a career as "the most celebrated model of her generation" and, later, as a BBC television presenter. She was muse to Pierre Balmain, the Parisian couturier, who said she was one of the world's most beautiful women along with Greta Garbo, Vivien Leigh and Marlene Dietrich.

In 1983, she trained as a psychotherapist, entering practice in 1986.

== Personal life ==
On 14 October 1960, she married William Astor, 3rd Viscount Astor (1907—1966) as his third wife. Viscount Astor, known to his family and friends as Bill Astor, was the eldest son of Waldorf Astor, 2nd Viscount Astor, and his wife, Nancy, Viscountess Astor. Upon her marriage, Bronwen became the mistress of Cliveden House, the mansion which her mother-in-law had made famous with her political salons. Together, they were the parents of:

- Hon. Janet Elizabeth Astor (born 1 December 1961), who married Charles Gordon-Lennox, Earl of March and Kinrara, in 1991. In 2017, Gordon-Lennox succeeded as the Duke of Richmond.
- Hon. Pauline Marian Dahlgren Astor (born 26 March 1964), who married George Christopher Vaughan Case, of Turville Lodge in Henley-on-Thames.

Within three years of her marriage Bronwen's world was turned upside down by the infamous Profumo affair, which brought down Prime Minister Harold Macmillan's government. Bill died from a heart attack in 1966, leaving Bronwen with two young daughters. Bronwen left Cliveden with her daughters, to live in Tuesley Manor, Godalming, Surrey. She opened her new home to the homeless. When she left Tuesley it was sold for £1.85 million.

Bronwen became a convert to the Roman Catholic faith, serving as an extraordinary minister at Holy Apostles Catholic Church, Pimlico. She died on 28 December 2017. A biography, Bronwen Astor: Her Life and Times, written by Peter Stanford, was published in 2000.
