= 1918 New Year Honours =

Appointments by King George V to various orders and honours

The 1918 New Year Honours were appointments by King George V to various orders and honours to reward and highlight good works by citizens of the British Empire. The appointments were published in The London Gazette and The Times in January, February and March 1918.

Unlike the 1917 New Year Honours, the 1918 honours included a long list of new knights bachelor and baronets, but again the list was dominated by rewards for war efforts. As The Times reported: "The New Year Honours represent largely the circumstances of war, and, perhaps, as usual, they also reflect human nature in an obvious form. The list is one of the rare opportunities for the public to scan the names of soldiers who have distinguished themselves in service."

The recipients of the Order of the British Empire were not classified as being within Military or Civilian divisions until following the war.

The recipients of honours are displayed here as they were styled before their new honour, and arranged by honour, with classes (Knight, Knight Grand Cross, etc.) and then divisions (Military, Civil, etc.) as appropriate.

== United Kingdom and British Empire ==
=== Viscount ===
- Marmaduke, Baron Furness, by the name, style, and title of Viscount Furness, of Grantley, in the West Riding of the county of York.

=== Baron ===
- The Rt. Hon. Sir Frederick Cawley, Baronet, Chancellor of the Duchy of Lancaster by the name, style and title of Baron Cawley, of Prestwich, in the county Palatine of Lancaster.
- Sir John Brownlee Lonsdale, Baronet, by the name, style and title of Baron Armaghdale, of Armagh, in the County of Armagh.
- Almeric Hugh Paget, by the name, style and title of Baron Queenborough, of Queenborough, in the County of Kent.
- Sir James Thomas Woodhouse Kt by the name, style and title of Baron Terrington, of Hudderefield, in the County of York.

=== Privy Councillor ===
The King appointed the following to His Majesty's Most Honourable Privy Council:

- Lord Hugh Cecil MP
- Sir Henry Craik KCB MP
- Sir Gordon Hewart KC MP
- Major Sir Henry Norman Bt MP
- Tom Richards MP
- Lord Edmund Talbot MVO DSO MP

=== Baronetcies ===
- Dunbar Plunket Barton, Judge of the High Court of Justice in Ireland, of Fethard, in the parish of Fethard, in the county of Tipperary.
- Alec Black, of Louth Park, in the county of Lincoln, Esquire.
- Edward Tootal Broadhurst, of Manchester, in the County Palatine of Lancaster, Esquire.
- James Craig MP, of Craigavon, in the County of Down, Esquire.
- Thomas Cope, of Osbaston Hall, in the parish of Market Bosworth, in the County of Leicester, Esquire.
- The Rt. Hon. Sir Henry Dalziel MP, of Brooklands, Chobham in the county of Surrey, Knight.
- Alfred Herbert Dixon, of Warford in the county of Chester, Esquire.
- The Rt. Hon. Ellis Jones Ellis-Griffith KC MP, of Llanidan, in the county of Anglesey, one of His Majesty's Counsel learned in the Law.
- Herbert James Huntington-Whiteley MP, of Grimley, in the county of Worcester, Esquire.
- Sir Joseph Lawrence.
- John Leigh, of Altrincham, in the county of Chester, Esquire.
- Frederick William Lewis, of Essendon Place, in the parish of Essendon, in the county of Hertford, Esquire.
- Sir Francis William Lowe Kt MP of Edgbaston, in the City of Birmingham, Knight.
- Sir George Allardyce Riddell Kt of Walton Heath, in the County of Surrey, Knight.
- Sir James Ritchie, Lord Mayor of London. (His name already appeared in some works of reference as a baronet, and his inclusion in the present honours list is intended to regularize an informality in the previous title.)
- The Rt. Hon. Sir Frederick Edwin Smith Kt KC MP
- Colonel Alexander Sprot CMG, of Garnkirk in the county of Lanark.
- John Stewart-Clark JP DL, of Dundas, in West Lothian, Esquire.
- Thomas Edward Watson JP, Esquire
- John Wood, of Hengrave, in the parish of Hengrave, in the county of Suffolk, Esquire.

=== Knight Bachelor ===
- Robert N. Anderson, Mayor of Derry and a member of the Irish Convention.
- William Nicholas Atkinson, ISO, lately Divisional Inspector of Mines.
- Dr. Barclay Josiah Baron, CM, Lord Mayor of Bristol.
- James Bird, Clerk of the London County Council
- James Boyton, MP.
- Edmond Browne.
- Robert Bruce, Editor of The Glasgow Herald.
- James Campbell, Chairman of the North of Scotland College of Agriculture.
- Emsley Carr, Editor and part proprietor of the News of the World.
- William Henry Clemmey, Mayor of Bootle.
- David S. Davies, formerly High Sheriff of Denbighshire; Chairman of the County Appeal Tribunal and Pensions Committee.
- Arthur Fell, MP.
- S. Archibald Garland, Mayor of Chichester 1912–18.
- Charles Henry Gibbs.
- Ernest W. Glover.
- William Henry Hadow, MA, MusDoc, Principal of Armstrong College, Newcastle upon Tyne.
- Anthony Hope Hawkins.
- Thomas Jeeves Horder, MD.
- John Morris-Jones, MA, Professor of Welsh at the University College of North Wales, Bangor.
- William F. Jury.
- John Scott Keltie, FRGS.
- John Lavery, ARA.
- John Lithiby, CB, Legal Adviser to the Local Government Board.
- Sidney James Low, MA, Lecturer on Imperial and Colonial History, University of London.
- George Lunn, Lord Mayor of Newcastle-upon-Tyne.
- Edwin Landseer Lutyens, ARA.
- James William McCraith, of Nottingham.
- Charles Mandleberg.
- Thomas Rogerson Marsden, of Oldham.
- Henry Milner-White, LLB, of Southampton.
- Alpheus Cleophas Morton, MP.
- Edward M. Mountain.
- David Murray, RA, President of the Royal Institute of Painters in Water Colours.
- Herbert Nield, KC MP, Recorder of York.
- James George Owen, Mayor of Exeter.
- John Phillips, MD FRCP, Professor Emeritus of Obstetric Medicine, King's College, London.
- Edmund Bampfylde Phipps, CB, late General Secretary to the Ministry of Munitions.
- Philip Edward Pilditch.
- Thomas Putnam, of Darlington.
- Stephen B. Quin, JP, Mayor of Limerick.
- Patrick Rose-Innes, KC.
- William Watson Rutherford, MP.
- William Henry Seager, Vice-Chairman of the Cardiff and Bristol Channel Shipowners' Association.
- Robert Russell Simpson, of Edinburgh. Writer to the Signet.
- George Frederick Sleight, of Grimsby.
- Arthur Spurgeon, JP.
- Lieutenant-Colonel Harold Jalland Stiles, RAMC.
- Edmund Stonehouse, Mayor of Wakefield.
- Henry Tozer, Alderman of the City of Westminster.
- Leslie Ward.
- Howard Kingsley Wood.
- Alfred William Yeo, MP.

==== British India ====
- Arthur Robert Anderson, CIE, CBE
- Edward Fairless Barber, Additional Member of the Council of the Governor of Madras for making Laws and Regulations
- Thomas William Birkett, of Bombay
- Colonel Harry Albert Lawless Hepper, (Major, Royal Engineers, retired).
- Thomas Frederick Dawson-Miller, KC, Chief Justice of the High Court of Judicature at Patna
- Binod Chunder Mitter, Barrister-at-Law, lately Officiating Advocate General, Bengal, and a Member of the Council of the Governor for making Laws and Regulations
- Henry Adolphus Byden Rattigan, Chief Judge of Chief Court, Punjab

==== Colonies, Protectorates, etc. ====
- Major Andrew Macphail, Canadian Army Medical Corps (Overseas Forces), Professor of the History of Medicine, McGill University, Montreal
- Major-General Donald Alexander Macdonald, CMG, ISO, Quartmaster-General, Canadian Militia
- Admiral Charles Edmund Kingsmill, RN (Retired), Director of Naval Service in the Dominion of Canada
- William James Gage, of Toronto
- The Hon. Charles Gregory Wade, KC, Agent-General in London for the State of New South Wales
- Frederick William Young, LLB, Agent General in London for the State of South Australia
- The Hon. Simon Fraser, formerly a Member of the Senate of the Commonwealth of Australia
- The Hon. William Fraser, Minister of Public Works of the Dominion of New Zealand
- John Robert Sinclair, representative of New Zealand on the Royal Commission on the Natural Resources, Trade and Legislation of certain portions of His Majesty's Dominions
- The Hon. John Carnegie Dove-Wilson, LLB, Judge President, Natal Provincial Division, Supreme Court of South Africa
- Major William Northrup McMillan, 25th (Service) Battalion, The Royal Fusiliers
- Bartle Henry Temple Frere, the Chief Justice of Gibraltar

=== Victoria Cross (VC) ===
Riband and medal of the Victoria Cross

- Major (acting Lieutenant-Colonel) John Sherwood-Kelly, CMG, DSO, Norfolk Regiment, commanded A Battalion, Royal Inniskilling Fusiliers.
- Captain (acting Major) George Randolph Pearkes, MC, Canadian Mounted Rifles.
- Captain John Fox Russell, MC, late RAMC, attached Royal Welsh Fusiliers.
- Lieutenant (temporary Captain) Robert Gee, MC, Royal Fusiliers.
- Lieutenant (acting Captain) Christopher Patrick John O'Kelly, MC, Canadian Infantry
- 2nd Lieutenant (acting Lieutenant-Colonel) Philip Eric Bent, DSO, late Leicestershire Regiment.
- 2nd Lieutenant (acting Captain) Arthur Moore Lascelles, Durham Light Infantry.
- No. 10153 Sergeant John MacAulay, DCM, Scots Guards (Stirling).
- No. 51339 Sergeant George Harry Mullin, MM, Canadian Infantry.
- No. 9522 Sergeant Charles Edward Spackman, Border Regiment (Fulham).
- No. 404017 Corporal Colin Barron, Canadian Infantry.
- No. 240171 Lance Corporal Robert McBeath, Seaforth Highlanders (Kinlochbervie, Lairg, Sutherland).
- No. 6657 Private George William Clare, late Lancers (Plumstead).
- No. 838301 Private Thomas William Holmes, Canadian Mounted Rifles.
- No. 437793 Private Cecil John Kinross, Canadian Infantry.
- No. 24213 Private Henry James Nicholas, New Zealand Infantry.
- No. 552665 Private James Peter Robertson, late Canadian Infantry.
- No. 2008 Lance Dafadar Gobind Singh, Indian Cavalry.

=== The Most Honourable Order of the Bath ===
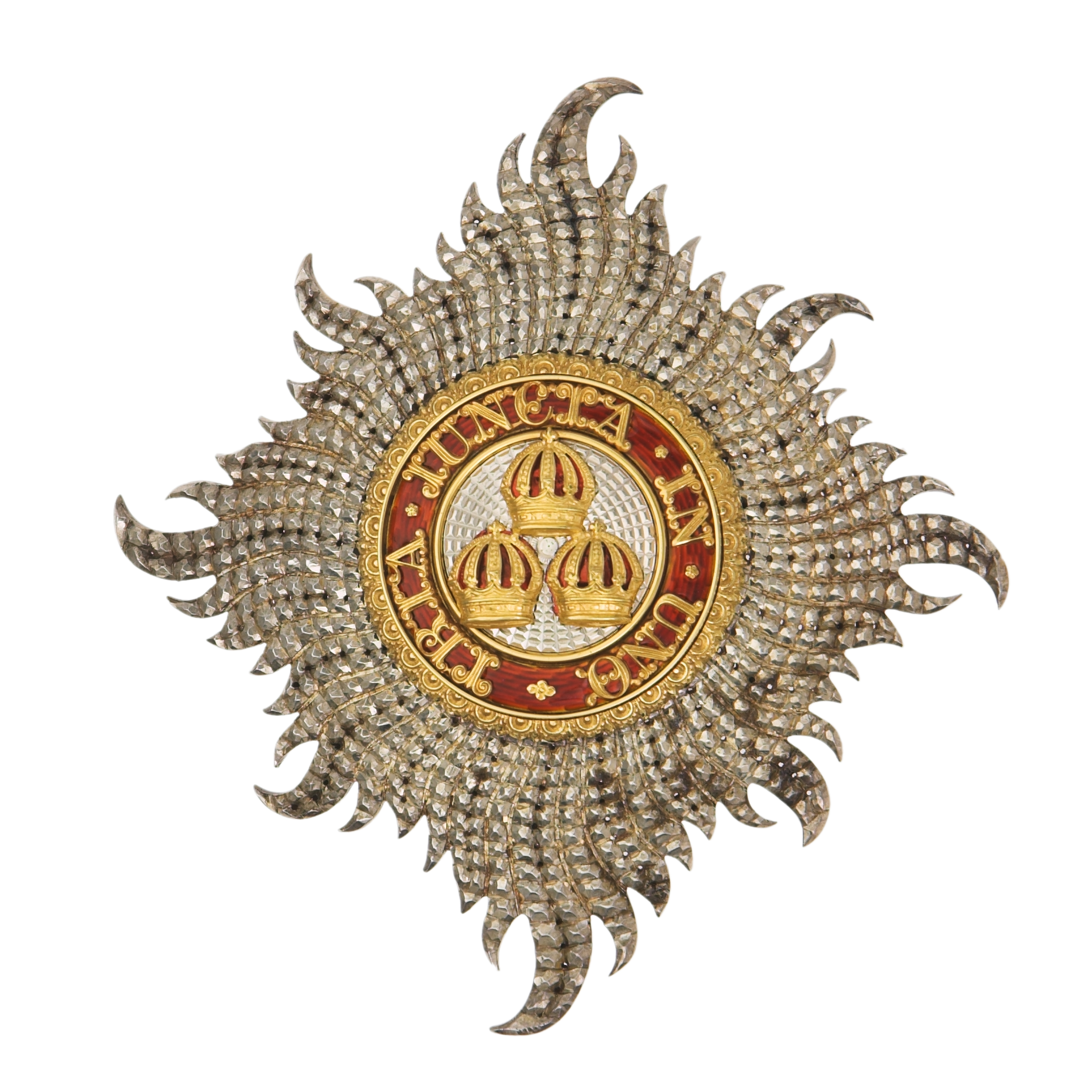
Civilian star of the Knight Grand Cross of the Order of the Bath

==== Knight Grand Cross of the Order of the Bath (GCB) ====
===== Military Division =====
====== Army ======
- General Sir Herbert Charles Onslow Plumer, GCMG, GCVO, KCB, ADC, General

====== Indian Army ======
- General Sir Robert Irvin Scallon, KCB, KCIE, DSO

===== Honorary Knight Grand Cross =====
- Honorary Lieutenant-General His Highness Maharaja Bahadur, Sir Partab Singh, GCSI, GCVO, KCB, ADC of Jodhpur.

==== Knight Commander of the Order of the Bath (KCB) ====
===== Military Division =====
====== Royal Navy ======
- Vice-Admiral Sir Cecil Fiennes Thursby, KCMG
- Rear-Admiral Alexander Ludovic Duff, CB
- Colonel (temporary Major-General) David Mercer, CB, Royal Marine Light Infantry

====== Army ======
- Major-General (temporary Lieutenant-General) James Aylmer Lowthorpe Haldane, CB, DSO
- Major-General (temporary Lieutenant-General) Alexander Hamilton Gordon, CB
- Major-General (temporary Lieutenant-General) Herbert Edward Watts, CB, CMG
- Lieutenant-General George Francis Milne, CB, DSO
- Major-General Edmund Guy Tulloch Bainbridge, CB
- Major-General Hugh Montague Trenchard, CB, DSO
- Major-General William Bernard Hickie, CB
- Major-General Sydney Turing Barlow Lawford, CB
- Major-General The Hon. William Lambton, CB, CMG, CVO, DSO
- Major-General George Montague Harper, CB, DSO
- Lieutenant-General Frederick Rudolph Lambart, Earl of Cavan, KP, CB, MVO
- Major-General (temporary Lieutenant-General) Arthur Edward Aveling Holland, MVO, DSO
- Major-General Harold Bridgwood Walker, CB, DSO
- Major-General Charles Patrick Amyatt Hull, CB
- Major-General Victor Arthur Couper, CB
- Lieutenant-General Henry Merrick Lawson, CB
- Surgeon-General Sir David Bruce, CB, FRS, FRCP, MB, retired pay, late Army Medical Service
- Major-General (temporary Lieutenant-General) Edward Stanislaus Bulfin, CB, CVO Colonel Yorkshire Regiment
- Major-General (temporary Lieutenant-General) Sir Philip Walhouse Chetwode, Bt, KCMG, CB, DSO

====== Australian Imperial Force ======
- Major-General John Monash, CB
- Colonel (temporary Major-General) Joseph John Talbot Hobbs, CB

====== Canadian Force ======
- Colonel (temporary Lieutenant-General) Sir Arthur William Currie, KCMG, CB
- Colonel (temporary Major-General) David Watson, CB, CMG
- Major-General (temporary Lieutenant-General) Sir Richard Ernest William Turner, VC, KCMG, CB, DSO, General Officer Commanding Canadian Forces in the United Kingdom

====== New Zealand Force ======
- Temporary Major-General Sir Andrew Hamilton Russell, KCMG, CB

====== South African Force ======
- Honorary Colonel (temporary Major-General) Henry Timson Lukin, CB, CMG, DSO

====== Honorary Knight Commander ======
- Honorary Major-General His Highness Maharaja Sir Ganga Singh Bahadur, GCSI, GCIE, ADC, of Bikaner.

===== Civil Division =====
- Surgeon-General William Henry Norman, CB, RN
- Engineer Vice-Admiral George Goodwin Goodwin, CB
- Surgeon-General George Lenthal Cheatle, CB, CVO, FRCS, RN
- Paymaster-in-Chief John Henry George Chapple, CB, CVO, RN
- Honorary Colonel Thomas Ainslie Lunham, CB, late Cork Royal Garrison Artillery Militia
- Alfred Daniel Hall, Secretary to the Board of Agriculture
- Sir George Newman Edin. Principal Medical Officer to the Board of Education

==== Companion of the Order of the Bath (CB) ====
===== Military Division =====
====== Royal Navy ======
- Rear-Admiral Thomas Dawson Lees Sheppard, MVO
- Rear-Admiral James Andrew Fergusson
- Rear-Admiral Allen Thomas Hunt, CSI
- Rear-Admiral Vivian Henry Gerald Bernard
- Rear-Admiral Edmund Hyde Parker
- Captain George Holmes Borrett, ADC
- Captain George Henry Baird
- Captain Edward Reeves
- Captain Thomas Drummond Pratt
- Captain William Wordsworth Fisher, MVO
- Captain Robert Nesham Bax
- Captain William Henry Dudley Boyle

====== Army ======
- Surgeon-General Richard Henry Stewart Sawyer, CMG, MB, retired pay, late Army Medical Service
- Major-General Reginald Byng Stephens, CMG
- Major-General Herbert Crofton Campbell Uniacke, CMG
- Major-General Philip Geoffrey Twining, CMG, MVO
- Major-General William Charles Giffard Heneker, DSO
- Major-General (temporary Lieutenant-General) Thomas Herbert John Chapman Goodwin, CMG, DSO, Director-General, Army Medical Service
- Colonel and Honorary Brigadier-General Cecil Vernon Wingfield-Stratford, CMG
- Colonel Robert Hammill Firth, FRCS, Army Medical Service
- Colonel (temporary Brigadier-General) Ernest Reuben Charles Butler, CMG, FRCVS
- Colonel and Honorary Surgeon-General Bruce Morland Skinner, CMG, MVO, Army Medical Service
- Lieutenant-Colonel and Brevet Colonel (temporary Colonel) Frederick Smith, CMG, DSO, retired pay, late Royal Army Medical Service
- Colonel (temporary Brigadier-General) William John Chesshyre Butler (retired pay), Reserve of Officers
- Colonel (temporary Brigadier-General) Richard Orlando Kellett, CMG
- Colonel Thomas Wyatt Hale, CMG, Army Ordnance Department
- Colonel (temporary Brigadier-General) Herbert de Touffreville Phillips, CMG
- Surgeon-General Henry Neville Thompson, CMG, DSO, MB, Army Medical Service
- Colonel Colquhoun Scott Dodgson, CMG
- Colonel (temporary Brigadier-General) Edwin Henry de Vere Atkinson, CMG, CIE
- Lieutenant-Colonel and Brevet Colonel (temporary Brigadier-General) James Wilfred Stirling, CMG, Royal Artillery.
- Colonel (temporary Brigadier-General) Percy Agnew Bainbridge, CMG, Army Ordnance Department
- Colonel Anthony John Luther, Army Medical Service
- Colonel James Matthew Forrest Shine, Army Medical Service
- Colonel James Barnett Wilson, CMG, MD, Army Medical Service
- Colonel Foster Reuss Newland, CMG, MB, Army Medical Service
- Colonel Hugh Champneys Thurston, CMG, Army Medical Service
- Colonel (temporary Brigadier-General) Hugh Gilbert Casson, CMG
- Colonel (temporary Major-General) Cecil Lothian Nicholson, CMG
- Colonel (temporary Brigadier-General) The Honourable Charles Strathavon Heathcote-Drummond-Willoughby, CMG, retired pay, Reserve of Officers
- Honorary Colonel (temporary Brigadier-General) Charles Loftus Bates, CMG, DSO, (Major, Reserve of Officers), Yeomanry
- Temporary Colonel Alfred Herbert Tubby, CMG, FRCS, MB, Army Medical Service (Lieutenant-Colonel, Royal Army Medical Corps, Territorial Force)
- Temporary Colonel Sidney Maynard Smith FRCS, MB, Army Medical Service (Captain, Royal Army Medical Corps, Territorial Force)
- Lieutenant-Colonel and Brevet Colonel (temporary Major-General) Cecil Edward Pereira, CMG, Coldstream Guards
- Major and Brevet Colonel (temporary Brigadier-General) Seymour Hulbert Sheppard, CMG, DSO, Royal Engineers
- Lieutenant-Colonel and Brevet Colonel (temporary Major-General) John Ponsonby, CMG, DSO, Coldstream Guards
- Lieutenant-Colonel and Brevet Colonel (temporary Brigadier-General) Edward Douglas, Lord Loch, CMG, MVO, DSO, Grenadier Guards
- Lieutenant-Colonel and Brevet Colonel (temporary Brigadier-General) Hamilton Lyster Reed, VC, CMG, Royal Artillery
- Lieutenant-Colonel and Brevet Colonel (temporary Major-General) Herbert Campbell Holman, CMG, DSO, Indian Army
- Lieutenant-Colonel and Brevet Colonel (temporary Brigadier-General) Edward Henry Willis, CMG, Royal Artillery.
- Lieutenant-Colonel and Brevet Colonel (temporary Brigadier-General) Robert James Bridgford, CMG, DSO, Shropshire Light Infantry
- Lieutenant-Colonel and Brevet Colonel (temporary Brigadier-General) John Francis Gathorne-Hardy, DSO, Grenadier Guards
- Major and Brevet Colonel (temporary Brigadier-General) Arthur Crawford Daly, West Yorkshire Regiment
- Major and Brevet Colonel (temporary Brigadier-General) James Ronald Edmondstone Charles, DSO, Royal Engineers
- Lieutenant-Colonel and Brevet Colonel (temporary Brigadier-General) Alexander Ernest Wardrop, CMG, Royal Artillery.
- Major and Brevet Colonel (temporary Major-General) Warren Hastings Anderson, Cheshire Regiment
- Lieutenant-Colonel and Brevet Colonel (temporary Brigadier-General) Arthur Ernest John Perkins, Royal Artillery.
- Lieutenant-Colonel and Brevet Colonel (temporary Major-General) Frederick Cuthbert Poole, CMG, DSO, Royal Artillery.
- Major and Brevet Colonel (temporary Major-General) Thomas Herbert Shoubridge, CMG, DSO, Northumberland Fusiliers
- Lieutenant-Colonel and Brevet Colonel (temporary Brigadier-General) John Campbell, CMG, DSO, Cameron Highlanders
- Lieutenant-Colonel and Brevet Colonel (temporary Brigadier-General) Cyril Maxwell Ross-Johnson, CMG, DSO, Royal Artillery.
- Lieutenant-Colonel and Brevet Colonel (temporary Brigadier-General) John Guy Rotton, CMG, Royal Artillery.
- Lieutenant-Colonel and Brevet Colonel (temporary Brigadier-General) Edward Spencer Hoare Nairne, CMG, Royal Artillery.
- Lieutenant-Colonel and Brevet Colonel (temporary Brigadier-General) Percy Orr Hazelton, CMG, Army Service Corps
- Lieutenant-Colonel and Brevet Colonel (temporary Brigadier-General) Hugo Douglas de Pree, CMG, Royal Artillery.
- Lieutenant-Colonel and Brevet Colonel (temporary Brigadier-General) Henry Hugh Tudor, CMG, Royal Artillery.
- Major and Brevet Colonel (temporary Major-General) Hugh Maude de Fellenberg Montgomery, Royal Artillery.
- Major and Brevet Colonel (temporary Brigadier-General) Nelson Graham Anderson, CMG, DSO, Army Service Corps
- Lieutenant-Colonel and Brevet Colonel (temporary Brigadier-General) George Jasper Farmar, CMG, Worcestershire Regiment
- Lieutenant-Colonel and Brevet Colonel (temporary Brigadier-General) Harry Dudley Ossulston Ward, CMG, Royal Artillery.
- Lieutenant-Colonel and Brevet Colonel (temporary Brigadier-General) George Sidney Clive, DSO, Grenadier Guards
- Lieutenant-Colonel and Brevet Colonel (temporary Brigadier-General) Ben Atkinson, CMG, Royal Artillery
- Lieutenant-Colonel and Brevet Colonel (temporary Brigadier-General) Percy Pollexfen de Blaquiere Radcliffe, DSO, Royal Artillery
- Lieutenant-Colonel and Brevet Colonel (temporary Brigadier-General) Alexander Anderson McHardy, CMG, DSO, Royal Artillery
- Lieutenant-Colonel and Brevet Colonel (temporary Brigadier-General) Julian McCarty Steele, CMG, Coldstream Guards
- Major and Brevet Colonel (temporary Brigadier-General) Samuel Herbert Wilson, CMG, Royal Engineers
- Lieutenant-Colonel and Brevet Colonel (temporary Brigadier-General) Charles William Gwynn, CMG, DSO, Royal Engineers
- Major and Brevet Colonel (temporary Major-General) Cyril John Deverell, West Yorkshire Regiment
- Lieutenant-Colonel and Brevet Colonel (temporary Major-General) Louis James Lipsett, CMG, Royal Irish Regiment
- Lieutenant-Colonel and Brevet Colonel (temporary Brigadier-General) Neville John Gordon Cameron, CMG, Cameron Highlanders
- Lieutenant-Colonel and Brevet Colonel (temporary Brigadier-General) Robert Clement Gore, CMG, Argyll and Sutherland Highlanders
- Major and Brevet Colonel (temporary Brigadier-General) Bartholomew George Price, CMG, DSO, Royal Fusiliers
- Lieutenant-Colonel and Honorary Colonel Charles Joseph Trimble, CMG Territorial Force Reserve (Temporary Honorary Major Royal Army Medical Corps)
- Lieutenant-Colonel (acting Colonel) Arthur Russell Aldridge, CSI, CMG, MB, Royal Army Medical Corps
- Lieutenant-Colonel (temporary Colonel) Wilfred Spedding Swabey CMG Army Service Corps
- Lieutenant-Colonel (temporary Brigadier-General) Edward Charles Massy, DSO, Royal Artillery
- Lieutenant-Colonel (temporary Brigadier-General) Percy Douglas Hamilton, CMG, Royal Artillery
- Lieutenant-Colonel (temporary Brigadier-General) Charles William Compton, CMG, Somerset Light Infantry
- Temporary Lieutenant-Colonel (temporary Colonel) Alexander Gibb, Royal Engineers
- Major and Brevet Lieutenant-Colonel (temporary Brigadier-General) Hugh Jamieson Elles, DSO, Royal Engineers, and Tank Corps
- Major (temporary Major-General) Stanley Fielder Mott, Reserve of Officers, King's Royal Rifle Corps
- Major (temporary Lieutenant-Colonel) James Gilbert Shaw Mellor, CMG, Reserve of Officers
- Temporary Brigadier-General Raymond de Candolle, Special List
- Colonel Alexander Dunstan Sharp, CMG, FRCS, Royal Army Medical Corps
- Lieutenant-Colonel (temporary Colonel) Thomas Finlayson Dewar, Royal Army Medical Corps
- Surgeon-General Francis John Jencken, MB, Army Medical Services
- Colonel Stewart Dalrymple Cleeve, retired pay, late Royal Engineers
- Lieutenant-Colonel and Brevet Colonel Arthur James Kelly, retired pay, late Royal Engineers
- Colonel (temporary Brigadier-General) Bridges George Lewis, DSO, retired pay
- Colonel Reynell Hamilton Bayley Taylor, Army Ordnance Depot
- Colonel Frederick Charles Lloyd
- Colonel (temporary Brigadier-General) Richard William Breeks
- Colonel George Francis Henry le Breton-Simmons
- Colonel Geoffrey Dominic Close, Royal Engineers
- Colonel (temporary Major-General) Dudley Howard Ridout, CMG
- Colonel William Coates, CB (civil), Royal Army Medical Corps, (Territorial Force, retired)
- Colonel (temporary Brigadier-General) Arthur Cecil Currie, CMG
- Lieutenant-Colonel and Brevet Colonel Meade James Crosbie-Dennis, Royal Artillery.
- Colonel Claude John Perceval, CMG, DSO, Royal Artillery.
- Colonel (temporary Brigadier-General) George Fraser Phillips, CMG
- Lieutenant-Colonel and Honorary Colonel William Charles Wright, retired (Reserve of Officers) Royal Artillery, Special Reserve.
- Major and Brevet Colonel (temporary Major-General) Robert Hutchison, DSO, Dragoon Guards.
- Temporary Colonel (Lieutenant-Colonel, Royal Army Medical Corps, Territorial Force) Howard Henry Tooth, CMG, MD, Army Medical Service
- Major and Brevet Colonel (temporary Brigadier-General) Basil Ferguson Burnett-Hitchcock, DSO, Nottinghamshire and Derbyshire Regiment.
- Lieutenant-Colonel (temporary Colonel) William George Sackville Benson, Army Pay Department.
- Lieutenant-Colonel (temporary Colonel) Achilles Samut, CMG, Army Ordnance Depot
- Lieutenant-Colonel (temporary Colonel) Reginald Seward Ruston, Army Pay Department.
- Lieutenant-Colonel and Brevet Colonel Julian John Leverson, CMG, retired pay, late Royal Engineers
- Temporary Honorary Lieutenant-Colonel George Seaton Buchanan, MD, Royal Army Medical Corps
- Major and Brevet Lieutenant-Colonel (temporary Brigadier-General) Harry Osborne Mance, CMG, DSO, Royal Engineers
- Temporary Lieutenant-Colonel Andrew Balfour, CMG, , FRCP, Royal Army Medical Corps
- Major and Brevet Lieutenant-Colonel Robert Markham Carter, Indian Medical Service
- Colonel Knightley Stalker Dunsterville, retired pay, late Indian Ordnance Department
- Colonel (honorary Brigadier-General) Andrew Laurie Macfie, late Liverpool Regiment
- Colonel (temporary Brigadier-General) Patrick William Hendry, late Highland Light Infantry and Volunteer Force
- Lieutenant-Colonel Ernest William Greg, Cheshire Regiment (retired, militia)
- Lieutenant-Colonel (honorary Colonel) Walter Robert Ludlow CB (civil), Territorial Force Reserve, late Royal Warwickshire Regiment
- Colonel William Charles Douglas, DSO, retired Territorial Force, late Royal Highlanders
- Lieutenant-Colonel (honorary Brigadier-General) George Llewellen Palmer, Territorial Force Reserve, late Yeomanry

====== Australian Imperial Force ======
- Colonel (temporary Brigadier-General) Henry Gordon Bennett, CMG
- Colonel (temporary Brigadier-General) Charles Henry Brand, CMG, DSO
- Colonel (temporary Brigadier-General) Thomas William Glasgow CMG, DSO
- Colonel (temporary Brigadier-General) James Heane CMG, DSO
- Colonel (temporary Brigadier-General) Granville de Laune Ryrie, CMG
- Colonel Alfred Sutton, CMG, Australian Army Medical Corps

====== Canadian Force ======
- Colonel Frederick Gault Finley, Canadian Army Medical Service
- Colonel (temporary Brigadier-General) Alexander McDougall, Canadian Forestry Corps
- Lieutenant-Colonel (temporary Brigadier-General) Edward Whipple Bancroft Morrison, CMG, DSO, Canadian Artillery

====== New Zealand Force ======
- Colonel Charles Mackie Begg, CMG, , FRCS, MRCP, New Zealand Medical Corps

====== Indian Army ======
- Lieutenant-Colonel and Brevet Colonel (temporary Major-General) Herbert Campbell Holman, CMG, DSO
- Lieutenant-Colonel and Brevet Colonel William Bernard James, CIE, MVO
- Lieutenant-Colonel and Brevet Colonel (temporary Brigadier-General) Alfred William Fortescue Knox
- Lieutenant-Colonel and Brevet Colonel (temporary Brigadier-General) Frederic George Lucas, DSO, Gurkhas
- Major-General Henry John Milnes MacAndrew, DSO
- Colonel Francis Clifton Muspratt, CMG, DSO
- Colonel Charles Gordon Prendergast
- Colonel Charles Wyndham Somerset, CMG, MVO
- Lieutenant-Colonel and Brevet Colonel Robert Edward Vaughan

===== Civil Division =====
- Rear-Admiral The Hon. Edward Stafford Fitzherbert
- Surgeon-General Arthur Edmunds, FRCS, RN
- Surgeon-General William Wenmoth Pryn, RN
- Surgeon-General James Lawrence Smith, MVO, RN
- Engineer Rear-Admiral William Frederick Pamphlett
- Engineer Rear-Admiral Edouard Gaudin
- Captain Sir Douglas Egremont Robert Brownrigg, Bt, RN (Commodore, 2nd Class)
- Colonel Commandant (Temporary Brigadier-General) Charles Ernest Curtoys, Royal Marine Light Infantry
- Captain Stanley Talbot Dean-Pitt, RN
- Captain Frank Osborne Creagh-Osborne, RN
- Deputy Surgeon-General Daniel Joseph Patrick McNabb, RN
- Paymaster-in-Chief James Bramble, RN
- Colonel Charles Grisborne Brittan, Royal Marine Light Infantry
- Engineer Captain Robert Bland Dixon, RN
- Frederick William Kite, MICE
- Major (Temporary Lieutenant-Colonel) Arthur Handley, retired pay, Reserve of Officers (temporary), Assistant Director of Artillery, War Office
- Charles Henry Wellesley, Baron Nunburnholme, DSO, H.M. Lieutenant for the East Riding of Yorkshire, President, East Riding Territorial Force Association
- Charles Mackinnon Douglas, DL, Chairman, Lanarkshire Territorial Force Association
- Colonel Henry Whistler Smith-Rewse, CVO, retired pay, Secretary, Devonshire Territorial Force Association
- Colonel Richard Thompson, retired pay, Secretary, Cheshire Territorial Force Association
- Major Godfrey Richard Conyngham Stuart, DL, retired pay, Secretary, Suffolk and Cambridgeshire Territorial Force Associations
- Captain Henry Littleton Wheeler, DSO, retired pay, Secretary, Staffordshire Territorial Force Association
- John Anderson, Secretary of the National Health Insurance Commission, England, now Secretary to the Ministry of Shipping
- Horace Perkins Hamilton, Private Secretary to the Chancellor of the Exchequer
- Arthur Henry Payne, Comptroller of Companies Department, Board of Trade
- Basil Alfred Kemball-Cook, Admiralty
- Francis Lewis Castle Floud, Assistant Secretary to the Board of Agriculture, now acting as Director of Local Organisation Division of Food Production Deptartment
- Lieutenant-Colonel Walter Edgeworth-Johnstone, Chief Commissioner, Dublin Metropolitan Police
- Ewan Francis Macpherson, Legal Member of the Local Government Board for Scotland
- Arthur Hamilton Norway, Assistant Secretary to the General Post Office
- William Sanger, Assistant Secretary to The Ministry of Pensions
- Maurice Lyndham Waller, Prison Commissioner, Head of Prisoners of War Division
- Mark Manley Waller, Director of Stores, Admiralty

=== The Most Exalted Order of the Star of India ===
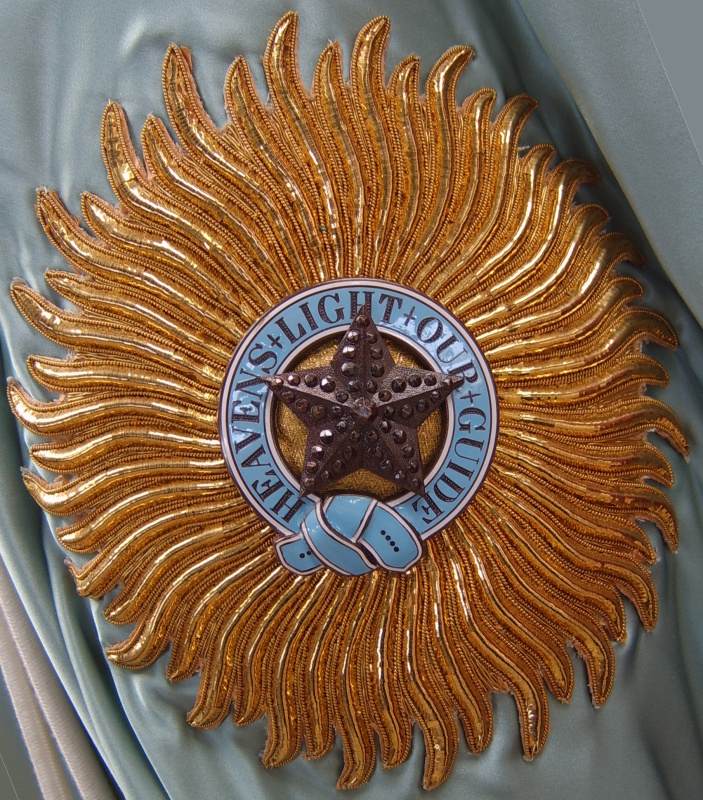
Star of a Knight Grand Commander of the Most Exalted Order of the Star of India

==== Knight Commander (KCSI) ====
- George Rivers Lowndes, KC, an Ordinary Member of the Council of the Governor-General of India
- His Highness Maharajadhiraja Maharawal Jawahir Singh Bahadur of Jaisalmer, Rajputana
- Sir Archdale Earle, KCIE, Indian Civil Service, Chief Commissioner of Assam
- Stuart Mitford Fraser, CSI, CIE, Indian Civil Service, Political Department, Resident at Hyderabad
- John Stratheden Campbell, CSI, CIE, Indian Civil Service, Junior Member, Board of Revenue, United Provinces of Agra and Oudh, and a Member of the Council of the Lieutenant-Governor for making Laws and Regulations
- Frank George Sly, CSI, Indian Civil Service, Commissioner, Central Provinces

In recognition of the services rendered by the native States of India during the War

- His Highness Maharaja Lakendra Govind Singh Bahadur, of Datia
- His Highness Maharajadhiraja Sri Sawai Maharaj Rana Udai Bhan Singh Lokindar Bahadur, of Dholpur

==== Companion (CSI) ====
- Henry Cecil Ferard, CIE, Indian Civil Service, Commissioner of Allahabad, United Provinces, and a Member of the Council of the Lieutenant-Governor for making Laws and Regulations
- Charles Evelyn Arbuthnot William Oldham, Indian Civil Service, Commissioner, Patna Division, Bihar and Orissa, and an Additional Member of the Council of the Lieutenant-Governor for making Laws and Regulations
- Evan Maconochie, Indian Civil Service, Agent to the Governor, Kathiawar, Bombay Presidency
- Francis Coope French, Indian Civil Service, Commissioner, Dacca Division, Bengal
- Lieutenant-Colonel and Brevet Colonel (Temporary Major-General) Charles William Grant Richardson, Indian Army, Deputy Quartermaster-General in India, lately Deputy Adjutant-General, Army Headquarters
- Major Arthur Prescott Trevor, CIE, Indian Army, Deputy Political Resident, Persian Gulf
- Horatio Norman Bolton, CIE, Indian Civil Service, Political Department, Deputy Commissioner, Peshawar, North-West Frontier Province
- Louis James Kershaw, CIE, Indian Civil Service (retired), Secretary, Revenue and Statistics Department, India Office

=== The Most Distinguished Order of Saint Michael and Saint George ===
Star of the Order of Saint Michael and Saint George

==== Knight Grand Cross of the Order of St Michael and St George (GCMG) ====
- Lieutenant-General Sir Cecil Frederick Nevil Macready, KCB, KCMG, Adjutant-General to the Forces
- Lieutenant-General Sir John Steven Cowans, KCB, MVO, Quartermaster-General to the Forces
- Temporary Surgeon-General Sir George Henry Makins, KCMG, CB, FRCS
- The Honourable Sir Francis Hyde Villiers, GCVO, KCMG, CB, His Majesty's Envoy Extraordinary and Minister Plenipotentiary to His Majesty the King of the Belgians

==== Knight Commander of the Order of St Michael and St George (KCMG) ====
- Vice-Admiral Frederick Charles Tudor Tudor, CB
- Rear-Admiral Edward Francis Benedict Charlton, CB
- Rear-Admiral Sir Osmond de Beauvoir Brock, KCVO, CB, CMG
- Rear-Admiral Richard Fortescue Phillimore, CB, MVO
- Major-General Charles Tyrwhitt Dawkins, CB, CMG
- Major-General Sir George Frederick Gorringe, KCB, CMG, DSO, late Royal Engineers
- Colonel (Temporary Brigadier-General) Robert Whyte Melville Jackson, CB, CMG, Army Ordnance Depot
- Colonel and Honorary Major-General Harold Daniel Edmund Parsons, CB, CMG, Army Ordnance Depot
- Surgeon-General William Grant Macpherson, CB, CMG, MB, Army Medical Service
- Major-General William Henry Rycroft, CB, CMG
- Colonel and Honorary Brigadier-General Francis Sudlow Garratt, CB, CMG, DSO, retired pay
- General Sir Henry Seymour Rawlinson, Bt, GCVO, KCB
- Lieutenant-General Sir Charles Fergusson, Bt, KCB, MVO, DSO
- Lieutenant-General Sir Ronald Charles Maxwell, KCB, late Royal Engineers
- Lieutenant-General Sir Launcelot Edward Kiggell, KCB
- Lieutenant-General (Temporary General) Sir Henry Sinclair Horne, KCB
- Major-General (Temporary Lieutenant-General) Sir Charles St. Leger Barter, KCB, CVO
- Major-General John Adye, CB
- Major-General Sir Edward Ritchie Coryton Graham, KCB, Colonel, Cheshire Regiment
- Major-General (Temporary Lieutenant-General) Sir Henry Fuller Maitland Wilson, KCB
- Major-General (Temporary Lieutenant-General) Sir Richard Cyril Byrne Haking, KCB
- Major-General Harvey Frederic Mercer, CB
- Major-General Frederic Manley Glubb, CB, DSO
- Major-General (Temporary Lieutenant-General) Charles James Briggs, KCB
- Major-General (Temporary Lieutenant-General) Sir George Henry Fowke, KCB
- Major-General (Temporary Lieutenant-General) Sir John Joseph Asser, KCVO, CB
- Major-General Richard Harte Keatinge Butler, CB
- Major-General Richard Henry Ewart, CB, CIE, DSO
- Major-General James Frederick Noel Birch, CB
- Major-General John Sharman Fowler, DSO
- Temporary Major-General Philip Arthur Manley Nash, CB
- Colonel and Honorary Surgeon-General James Murray Irwin, CB, MB, Retired Pay, late Army Medical Service
- Colonel and Honorary Surgeon-General James Maher, CB, Retired Pay, late Army Medical Service
- Temporary Colonel James Purves Stewart, CB, , FRCP, Army Medical Service
- Temporary Colonel Thomas Crisp English, CMG, , FRCS, Army Medical Service
- Colonel (Temporary Honorary Major-General) George James Butcher, CB, CMG, Army Ordnance Depot
- Honorary Major-General Fred Smith, CB, CMG, FRCVS, retired pay, Royal Army Veterinary Corps
- Temporary Colonel Archibald Edward Garrod, CMG, , FRS, Army Medical Service
- Lieutenant-General Sir Herbert Eversley Belfield, KCB, DSO, retired pay, Colonel, West Riding Regiment
- Major-General The Honourable Cecil Edward Bingham, CB, CVO
- Major-General Frederick Barton Maurice, CB
- Major-General The Honourable Francis Richard Bingham, CB
- Colonel and Honorary Surgeon-General Michael William Russell, CB, retired pay, late Army Medical Service
- Temporary Colonel Charles Alfred Ballance, CB, MVO, , FRCS, Army Medical Service
- Major-General Louis Jean Bols, CB, DSO. For services rendered in connection with the Military Operations culminating in the capture of Jerusalem.

===== Australian Imperial Force =====
- Major-General The Honourable James Whiteside McCay, CB, Australian Imperial Force

===== Colonial List =====
- His Honour Frank Stillman Barnard, Lieutenant-Governor of the Province of British Columbia
- Horace Archer Byatt, CMG, Civil Administrator, German East Africa
- Major-General Samuel Benfield Steele, CB, MVO, Canadian Militia
- Herbert James Read, CB, CMG, Assistant Under-Secretary of State, Colonial Office
- The Honourable John Mark Davies, President of the Legislative Council of the State of Victoria

===== Honorary Knight Commander =====
- Adly Yeghen Pasha, Minister of Education in the Egyptian Government

==== Companion of the Order of St Michael and St George (CMG) ====
- Captain Henry George Glas Sandeman, RN (Commodore, 2nd Class)
- Captain James William Combe, RN
- Captain George Bingham Powell, RN
- Captain Frederic Godfrey Bird, RN, DSO
- Captain David Murray Anderson, RN, MVO
- Captain Percy Molyneux Rawson Royds, RN
- Captain Charles Samuel Wills, RN, DSO
- Captain Charles Laverock Lambe, RN, DSO
- Engineer Captain Archie Russell Emdin, RN
- Commander (Acting Captain) Harold Escombe, RN
- Commander (Acting Captain) Donald John Munro, RN
- Commander (Acting Captain) Fitzmaurice Acton, RN
- Commander (Acting Captain) Ferdinand Halford Elderton, RN, DSO
- Commander (Acting Captain) Archibald Cochrane, RN
- Fleet-Paymaster Charles Edward Allen Woolley, RN
- Fleet-Paymaster Tom Seaman, RN
- Fleet-Paymaster Charles Henry Rowe, RN
- Fleet-Paymaster Charles Ernest Batt, RN
- Fleet-Surgeon Edward Henry Meaden, RN
- Lieutenant-Colonel Francis Doveton Bridges, Royal Marine Light Infantry
- Major Henry Cleeve Benett, Royal Marine Light Infantry
- Lieutenant-Commander (Acting Commander) David George Hogarth, Royal Naval Volunteer Reserve
- Colonel (Temporary Brigadier-General) Jonas Hamilton du Boulay Travers, CB
- Colonel (Temporary Brigadier-General) William Arthur Murray Thompson, CB
- Colonel (Temporary Brigadier-General) Cyril Henry Leigh James, CB
- Colonel St. John William Topp Parker, CB
- Colonel Charles Marling Cartwright, CB, Indian Army
- Colonel (Temporary Brigadier-General) Arthur Herbert Hussey, CB
- Colonel (Temporary Brigadier-General) John Gordon Geddes, CB
- Lieutenant-Colonel and Brevet-Colonel (Colonel in Army) Thomas James Atherton, CB, retired pay
- Lieutenant-Colonel and Brevet Colonel Alexander Vaughan Payne, Regimental Police, late Wiltshire Regiment
- Colonel (Temporary Major-General) Edward Ranulph Kenyon, CB, retired pay
- Colonel (Temporary Brigadier-General) Walter Charteris Ross, CB, retired pay
- Colonel (Temporary Brigadier-General) Acton Lemuel Schreiber, CB, DSO, ADC, Royal Engineers
- Colonel (Temporary Brigadier-General) Disney John Menzies Fasson, CB, Royal Artillery
- Colonel (Temporary Brigadier-General) George Strachan Cartwright, CB
- Colonel (Temporary Brigadier-General) Gardiner Humphreys, CB, DSO
- Lieutenant-Colonel and Brevet Colonel Godfrey Massy, retired pay
- Colonel (Temporary Brigadier-General) Charles Cunliffe-Owen, CB
- Colonel (Temporary Brigadier-General) Arundel Martyn, General List
- Colonel Philip Cecil Harcourt Gordon, Army Medical Service
- Colonel Charles Joseph MacDonald, MD, Army Medical Service
- Colonel Edward George Browne, CB, Army Medical Service
- Colonel Samuel Guise Moores, CB, Army Medical Service
- Lieutenant-Colonel and Brevet Colonel (Temporary Colonel) Howard Ensor, DSO, MB, Royal Army Medical Corps
- Colonel (Temporary Brigadier-General) Colin Lawrence Macnab
- Lieutenant-Colonel and Brevet Colonel (Temporary Brigadier-General) Charles Stuart Wilson, CB, Royal Engineers
- Lieutenant-Colonel and Brevet Colonel (Temporary Brigadier-General) Herbert Edward John Brake, CB DSO, Royal Artillery.
- Colonel (Temporary Brigadier-General) Martin Newman Turner, CB
- Major and Brevet Colonel (Temporary Brigadier-General) Clement Yatman, DSO, Northumberland Fusiliers
- Lieutenant-Colonel and Brevet Colonel (Temporary Brigadier-General) Pomeroy Holland-Pryor, MVO, DSO, Indian Army
- Lieutenant-Colonel and Brevet Colonel (Temporary Brigadier-General) Sydney Fortescue Metcalfe, DSO, Royal Artillery
- Lieutenant-Colonel and Brevet Colonel (Temporary Brigadier-General) Geoffrey Herbert Anthony White, DSO, Royal Artillery
- Lieutenant-Colonel and Brevet Colonel (Temporary Brigadier-General) Arthur Wharton Peck, Indian Cavalry
- Major and Brevet Lieutenant-Colonel Walter Mervyn St. George Kirke, DSO, Royal Artillery
- Temporary Colonel (Lieutenant-Colonel, Royal Army Medical Corps, Territorial Force) William Pasteur, MD, Army Medical Service
- Major and Brevet Colonel (Temporary Brigadier-General) Gerald Farrell Boyd, DSO Royal Irish Regiment
- Lieutenant-Colonel and Brevet Colonel (Temporary Brigadier-General) Thomas Stanton Lambert, East Lancashire Regiment
- Lieutenant-Colonel and Brevet Colonel (Temporary Brigadier-General) John Samuel Jocelyn Percy, DSO, East Lancashire Regiment
- Major and Brevet Colonel (Temporary Brigadier-General) Percival Otway Hambro, Hussars
- Lieutenant-Colonel Charles Tilson Hudson, Indian Medical Service
- Lieutenant-Colonel William Bromley-Davenport, DSO, Territorial Force Reserve
- Lieutenant-Colonel Philip John Joseph Radcliffe, Royal Engineers
- Lieutenant-Colonel (Temporary Colonel) Maurice Spencer, Army Ordnance Department
- Lieutenant-Colonel George Ambrose Cardew, DSO, Royal Field Artillery.
- Lieutenant-Colonel (Temporary Colonel) Ernest Carden Freeth Gillespie, CB, Army Service Corps
- Lieutenant-Colonel (Temporary Colonel) Daniel Davis Shanahan, DSO, Royal Army Medical Corps
- Lieutenant-Colonel Walter Ernest Onslow Campbell Blunt, Army Pay Department.
- Lieutenant-Colonel (Temporary Brigadier-General) Henry Jenkins Brock, DSO, Royal Artillery
- Lieutenant-Colonel (Temporary Brigadier-General) Edward John Russell Peel, DSO, Royal Field Artillery
- Lieutenant-Colonel Cecil William Davy, Royal Engineers
- Lieutenant-Colonel George Augustus Stewart Cape, Royal Field Artillery
- Lieutenant-Colonel (Temporary Brigadier-General) Arthur Cecil Lowe, DSO, Royal Field Artillery
- Lieutenant-Colonel Ulric Oliver Thynne, DSO, Yeomanry
- Lieutenant-Colonel and Honorary Colonel William Dutton Burrard, Royal Field Artillery
- Temporary Lieutenant-Colonel (Temporary Brigadier-General) Edward Henry Charles Patrick Bellingham, DSO, General List, (Lieutenant, Reserve of Officers)
- Colonel Ernest William Bliss, DSO, Army Medical Service
- Colonel Alfred Ernest Conquer Keble, DSO, Army Medical Service
- Temporary Honorary Lieutenant-Colonel Nathan Raw, MD, Royal Army Medical Corps
- Temporary Lieutenant-Colonel Cecil Walter Paget, DSO, Royal Engineers
- Lieutenant-Colonel (Temporary Brigadier-General) Philip Leveson Gower, DSO, Nottinghamshire and Derbyshire Regiment
- Lieutenant-Colonel James Anderson, DSO, Highland Light Infantry
- Honorary Lieutenant-Colonel Percy George Davies, Army Ordnance Department
- Lieutenant-Colonel Edward William Saurin Brooke, DSO, Royal Artillery
- Captain and Brevet Lieutenant-Colonel (Temporary Brigadier-General) Ernest Frederick Orby Gascoigne, DSO, retired pay, Reserve of Officers, Grenadier Guards
- Major and Brevet Lieutenant-Colonel (Temporary Brigadier-General) Thomas Herbert Francis Price, DSO, Duke of Cornwall's Light Infantry
- Lieutenant-Colonel (Temporary Brigadier-General) George Birnie Mackenzie, DSO, Royal Garrison Artillery
- Lieutenant-Colonel Charles Frederick Moores, DSO, Army Service Corps
- Colonel Charles William Profeit, DSO, MB, Army Medical Service
- Colonel Robert James Blackham, CIE, DSO, Army Medical Service
- Lieutenant-Colonel (Temporary Brigadier-General) Horace Giesler Lloyd, DSO, Royal Artillery
- Lieutenant-Colonel (Temporary Brigadier-General) Percy Cyriac Burrell Skinner, DSO, Northamptonshire Regiment
- Lieutenant-Colonel William Charles Eric Rudkin, DSO, Royal Field Artillery
- Lieutenant-Colonel (Temporary Brigadier-General) Bertram Hewett Hunter Cooke, DSO, Rifle Brigade
- Major and Brevet Lieutenant-Colonel (Temporary Brigadier-General) Edward Nicholson Broadbent, DSO, King's Own Scottish Borderers
- Major and Brevet Lieutenant-Colonel Arthur Richard Careless Sanders, DSO Royal Engineers
- Lieutenant-Colonel Robert Gabbett Parker, DSO, Royal Lancaster Regiment
- Lieutenant-Colonel (Temporary Brigadier-General) Arthur Thackeray Beckwith, DSO, Hampshire Regiment
- Lieutenant-Colonel (Temporary Brigadier-General) Edward Harding Newman, DSO, Royal Field Artillery
- Lieutenant-Colonel Francis Arthur Wynter, DSO, Royal Garrison Artillery
- Lieutenant-Colonel John Francis Innes Hay Doyle, DSO, Royal Artillery
- Temporary Lieutenant-Colonel (Temporary Brigadier-General) Cyril Aubrey Blacklock, DSO, General List
- Lieutenant-Colonel Edward Evans, DSO, Wiltshire Regiment
- Lieutenant-Colonel Francis Douglas Logan, DSO, Royal Artillery
- Major and Brevet Lieutenant-Colonel (Temporary Brigadier-General) George Ayscough Armytage, DSO, King's Royal Rifle Corps
- Major and Brevet Lieutenant-Colonel (Temporary Brigadier-General) John Vaughan Campbell, VC, DSO, Coldstream Guards
- Major and Brevet Lieutenant-Colonel (Temporary Brigadier-General) William Harry Verelst Darell, DSO, Coldstream Guards
- Major and Brevet Lieutenant-Colonel Stuart William Hughes Rawlins, DSO, Royal Field Artillery
- Major and Brevet Lieutenant-Colonel (Acting Lieutenant-Colonel) Charles Michael Browne, DSO, Royal Engineers
- Major and Brevet Lieutenant-Colonel (Temporary Brigadier-General) Llewelyn Alberic Emilius Price-Davies, VC, DSO King's Royal Rifle Corps
- Major and Brevet Lieutenant-Colonel (Temporary Brigadier-General) Herbert Cecil Potter, DSO, Liverpool Regiment
- Lieutenant-Colonel (Temporary Brigadier-General) Edward Arthur Fagan, DSO, Indian Army
- Temporary Lieutenant-Colonel John Anselm Samuel Gray, DSO, Special List
- Lieutenant-Colonel Manners Ralph Wilmott Nightingale, DSO, Indian Army
- Temporary Lieutenant-Colonel (Temporary Brigadier-General) Geoffrey Harnett Harrisson, DSO. Royal Engineers
- Lieutenant-Colonel Walter Bagot Pearson, Lancashire Fusiliers
- Temporary Lieutenant-Colonel (Temporary Brigadier-General) Frank Percy Crozier, DSO, General List
- Lieutenant-Colonel Charles William Wilkinson, DSO, Royal Engineers
- Lieutenant-Colonel (Temporary Brigadier-General) Arthur Ellershaw, DSO, Royal Garrison Artillery
- Lieutenant-Colonel Charles Richard Newman, DSO Royal Artillery
- Major and Brevet Lieutenant-Colonel (Temporary Brigadier-General) Reginald Seaburne May, DSO, Royal Fusiliers
- Major and Brevet Lieutenant-Colonel (Temporary Lieutenant-Colonel) Guy Hamilton Boileau, DSO, Royal Engineers
- Major and Brevet Lieutenant-Colonel Edmund William Costello, VC, DSO, Indian Army
- Major and Brevet Lieutenant-Colonel (Temporary Brigadier-General) Robert Harvey Kearsley, DSO, Dragoon Guards
- Major and Brevet Lieutenant-Colonel (Temporary Brigadier-General) Edward Lacy Challenor, DSO, Leicestershire Regiment
- Major and Brevet Lieutenant-Colonel (Temporary Brigadier-General) Francis James Marshall, DSO, Seaforth Highlanders
- Major and Brevet Lieutenant-Colonel (Temporary Colonel) Frank Graham Marsh, Indian Army
- Major and Brevet Lieutenant-Colonel (Temporary Lieutenant-Colonel) Sir William Algernon Ireland Kay, Bt, DSO, King's Royal Rifle Corps
- Major and Brevet Lieutenant-Colonel Frederick William Lawrence Sheppard Hart Cavendish, DSO, Lancers
- Major and Brevet Lieutenant-Colonel (Temporary Brigadier-General) Thomas Wolryche Stansfeld, DSO, Yorkshire Regiment
- Major and Brevet Lieutenant-Colonel John Edward Spencer Brind, DSO, Royal Artillery
- Major and Brevet Lieutenant-Colonel (Acting Lieutenant-Colonel) George Henry Addison, DSO, Royal Engineers
- Major and Brevet Lieutenant-Colonel (Temporary Lieutenant-Colonel) William Edmund Ironside, DSO, Royal Artillery
- Major and Brevet Lieutenant-Colonel Robert Gordon-Finlayson, DSO, Royal Artillery
- Major and Brevet Lieutenant-Colonel (Temporary Lieutenant-Colonel) Alan Thomas Paley, DSO, Rifle Brigade
- Major and Brevet Lieutenant-Colonel James Keith Dick-Cunyngham, DSO, Gordon Highlanders
- Major and Brevet Lieutenant-Colonel (Temporary Brigadier-General) Francis Stewart Montague-Bates, DSO, East Surrey Regiment
- Captain and Brevet Lieutenant-Colonel (Temporary Brigadier-General) Guy Payan Dawnay, MVO, DSO, Reserve of Officers, late Coldstream Guards
- Temporary Lieutenant-Colonel Ernest Henry Starling, MD, FRCP, FRS, Royal Army Medical Corps
- Temporary Lieutenant-Colonel Leonard Stanley Dudgeon, FRCP, Royal Army Medical Corps
- Lieutenant-Colonel Francis William Gosset, DSO, Royal Artillery
- Lieutenant-Colonel John Hamilton Hall, DSO, Middlesex Regiment
- Lieutenant-Colonel Herbert Norwood Blakeney, DSO, Middlesex Regiment
- Major and Brevet Lieutenant-Colonel (Temporary Lieutenant-Colonel) Arthur Jervois Turner, DSO, Royal Artillery
- Major and Brevet Lieutenant-Colonel (Temporary Brigadier-General) Henry Clifford Rodes Green, DSO, King's Royal Rifle Corps
- Major and Brevet Lieutenant-Colonel (Temporary Brigadier-General) George Dominic Price, West Yorkshire Regiment
- Major and Brevet Lieutenant-Colonel (Temporary Brigadier-General) Charles George Lewes, DSO, Essex Regiment
- Major and Brevet Lieutenant-Colonel (Temporary Brigadier-General) Gerald Edward Bayley, DSO, York & Lancaster Regiment
- Lieutenant-Colonel (Temporary Brigadier-General) William Kaye Legge, DSO, Essex Regiment
- Major and Brevet Lieutenant-Colonel (Temporary Brigadier-General) Robert Emile Shepherd Prentice, DSO, Highland Light Infantry
- Major and Brevet Lieutenant-Colonel (Temporary Lieutenant-Colonel) Sir Hereward Wake, Bt, DSO, King's Royal Rifle Corps
- Major and Brevet Lieutenant-Colonel (Temporary Brigadier-General) Rodolph Ladeveze Adlercron, DSO, Cameron Highlanders
- Major and Brevet Lieutenant-Colonel (Temporary Brigadier-General) Charles Howard Foulkes, DSO, Royal Engineers
- Major and Brevet Lieutenant-Colonel (Temporary Brigadier-General) Edward Weyland Martin Powell, DSO, Retired Pay, Reserve of Officers, Royal Field Artillery
- Lieutenant-Colonel (Temporary Brigadier-General) Clennell William Collingwood, DSO, Royal Garrison Artillery
- Major and Brevet Lieutenant-Colonel (Temporary Lieutenant-Colonel) Percival Suther, DSO, Royal Garrison Artillery
- Major and Brevet Lieutenant-Colonel Harold St. John Loyd Winterbotham, DSO, Royal Engineers
- Major and Brevet Lieutenant-Colonel Arthur Wollaston Bartholomew, DSO, Royal Artillery
- Major and Brevet Lieutenant-Colonel Cecil Percival Heywood, DSO, Coldstream Guards
- Major and Brevet Lieutenant-Colonel (Temporary Brigadier-General) Harry Beauchamp Douglas Baird, DSO, Indian Army
- Major and Brevet Lieutenant-Colonel (Temporary Brigadier-General) Tom Ince Webb-Bowen, Bedfordshire Regiment
- Major and Brevet Lieutenant-Colonel (Temporary Brigadier-General) Hugh Roger Headlam, DSO, York & Lancaster Regiment
- Major and Brevet Lieutenant-Colonel (Temporary Lieutenant-Colonel) Norman William Webber, DSO, Royal Engineers
- Major and Brevet Lieutenant-Colonel Walter William Pitt-Taylor, DSO, Rifle Brigade
- Major and Brevet Lieutenant-Colonel Robert John Collins, DSO, Royal Berkshire Regiment
- Major and Brevet Lieutenant-Colonel (Temporary Lieutenant-Colonel) Charles Ogston, DSO, Gordon Highlanders
- Major and Brevet Lieutenant-Colonel (Temporary Lieutenant-Colonel) Gervase Thorpe, DSO, Argyll and Sutherland Highlanders
- Major and Brevet Lieutenant-Colonel (Temporary Brigadier-General) Winston Joseph Dugan, DSO, Worcestershire Regiment
- Major and Brevet Lieutenant-Colonel Lewis James Comyn, DSO, Connaught Rangers
- Major and Brevet Lieutenant-Colonel (Temporary Brigadier-General) Charles Samuel Owen, DSO, Royal Welsh Fusiliers
- Major and Brevet Lieutenant-Colonel (Temporary Brigadier-General) Clifton Inglis Stockwell, DSO, Royal Welsh Fusiliers
- Major and Brevet Lieutenant-Colonel (Temporary Lieutenant-Colonel) Charles Harry Lyon, DSO, North Staffordshire Regiment
- Major and Brevet Lieutenant-Colonel (Temporary Brigadier-General) Arthur Hardwicke Spooner, DSO, Lancashire Fusiliers
- Major and Brevet Lieutenant-Colonel (Temporary Brigadier-General) Henry Pelham Burn, DSO, Gordon Highlanders
- Major and Brevet Lieutenant-Colonel John Greer Dill, DSO, Leinster Regiment
- Major and Brevet Lieutenant-Colonel (Temporary Lieutenant-Colonel) Henry Courtenay Hawtrey, DSO, Royal Engineers
- Temporary Lieutenant-Colonel (Temporary Brigadier-General) Brodie Haldane Henderson, Royal Engineers
- Temporary Lieutenant-Colonel Edward Hyde Hamilton Gordon, DSO, General List
- Lieutenant-Colonel Arthur Clement Wilkinson, DSO, Royal Garrison Artillery
- Major and Brevet Lieutenant-Colonel (Temporary Brigadier-General) Herbert Edward Trevor, DSO, Yorkshire Light Infantry
- Major (Temporary Lieutenant-Colonel) Francis Jenkins, Coldstream Guards
- Major (Temporary Lieutenant-Colonel) Percy Gerald Parker Lea, DSO, Army Service Corps
- Major (Temporary Lieutenant-Colonel) Henry Warburton Hill, DSO, Royal Field Artillery
- Major (Temporary Lieutenant-Colonel) Roger Gordon Thomson, DSO, Royal Field Artillery
- Major and Brevet Lieutenant-Colonel (Temporary Brigadier-General) Gerald Carew Sladen, DSO, MC, Rifle Brigade
- Temporary Lieutenant-Colonel Christopher D'Arcy Bloomfield Saltern Baker-Carr, DSO, Tank Corps
- Major John Edmund Hugh Balfour, DSO, Reserve of Officers, late Hussars (Lieutenant-Colonel and Honorary Colonel, Territorial Force, Retired)
- Major (Temporary Lieutenant-Colonel) Alexander James King, DSO, Reserve of Officers, late Royal Lancaster Regiment (Honorary Lieutenant-Colonel, Yeomanry)
- Temporary Major (Acting Lieutenant-Colonel) George Simpson Pitcairn, Royal Engineers
- Major (Temporary Lieutenant-Colonel) Vaughan Randolph Hine-Haycock, DSO, Regimental Police, Reserve of Officers, late Royal Artillery
- Captain and Brevet Major (Temporary Lieutenant-Colonel) Rudolph Edmund Aloysius, Viscount Feilding, DSO, Coldstream Guards, Special Reserve
- Captain and Brevet Major (Temporary Lieutenant-Colonel) Major Cyril Edward Wilson, DSO, retired pay, Reserve of Officers, late East Lancashire Regiment.
- Captain (Temporary Lieutenant-Colonel Bryan Charles Fairfax, retired pay, Reserve of Officers, New Armies
- Colonel (Temporary Brigadier-General) The Rt. Hon. John Edward Bernard Seely, CB, DSO, Yeomanry
- Lieutenant-Colonel (Honorary Colonel) Arthur Saxby Barham, London Regiment
- Lieutenant-Colonel William Elliott Batt, Royal Field Artillery
- Lieutenant-Colonel Frederick William Duffield Bendall, Middlesex Regiment
- Lieutenant-Colonel Lionel Leonard Bilton, Worcestershire Regiment
- Lieutenant-Colonel Hugh Delabere Bousfield, DSO, West Yorkshire Regiment
- Lieutenant-Colonel Robert Chapman, DSO, Royal Field Artillery
- Lieutenant-Colonel Robert Joyce Clarke, DSO, Royal Berkshire Regiment
- Lieutenant-Colonel Charles Clifford, Royal Field Artillery
- Lieutenant-Colonel Hugh Charles Copeman, DSO, retired pay, Reserve of Officers, (late Essex Regiment), Suffolk Regiment (Territorial Force)
- Lieutenant-Colonel Clarence Isidore Ellis, Royal Army Medical Corps
- Lieutenant-Colonel Archibald Stewart Leslie, Yeomanry
- Lieutenant-Colonel Frederick William Schofield, Oxfordshire & Buckinghamshire Light Infantry
- Lieutenant-Colonel John William Slater, Liverpool Regiment
- Lieutenant-Colonel Francis Henry Douglas Charlton Whitmore, DSO, Yeomanry
- Major-General Raymond Northland Revell Reade, CB
- Colonel William Pitt, retired pay
- Colonel Thomas Ryder Main, CB, retired pay
- Colonel Arthur Henry Bagnold, CB, retired pay
- Colonel (Temporary Brigadier-General) William Hodgson Suart, retired pay
- Colonel Henry Richard Beadon Donne, CB, retired pay
- Lieutenant-Colonel and Brevet Colonel Alfred Keene, DSO, retired pay, late Royal Artillery
- Lieutenant-Colonel and Brevet Colonel William Augustus Edmund St. Clair, retired pay, late Royal Engineers
- Colonel (Honorary Brigadier-General) Frederick Rainsford-Hannay, CB, retired pay
- Colonel Charles Henry Darling, retired pay
- Lieutenant-Colonel and Brevet Colonel Percy Rice Mockler, retired pay, Reserve of Officers, late Royal Warwickshire Regiment
- Honorary Colonel Sir Herbert Merton Jessel, Bt, London Regiment and Remount Service
- Colonel and Honorary Brigadier-General Hugh James Archdale, CB, retired pay
- Major and Brevet Colonel Edward Bell, Reserve of Officers, late Worcestershire Regiment
- Colonel Joseph Griffiths, MD, FRCS, Royal Army Medical Corps
- Colonel (Temporary Brigadier-General) Charles Edwin Nuthall, CB
- Colonel Guy William Fitton, Army Pay Department
- Colonel (Temporary Brigadier-General) George Francis Milner, DSO
- Colonel (Temporary Brigadier-General) Arnaud Clarke Painter
- Colonel and Honorary Brigadier-General Frank Grimshaw Lagier Lamotte, retired pay, Reserve of Officers
- Colonel Louis Peile Carden, retired pay
- Colonel Arthur Ludovic Molesworth, retired pay
- Colonel Charles Pye Oliver, MD, Honorary Physician to the King, Royal Army Medical Corps
- Colonel and Honorary Brigadier-General Philip Thomas Buston, CB, DSO, retired pay
- Colonel (Temporary Brigadier-General) Edward Bickford
- Colonel Ernest Augustus Tudor Tudor
- Colonel Frederick Charlton Meyrick, CB, Reserve of Officers, Late Major, Hussars
- Colonel (Temporary Brigadier-General) Harold Stephen Langhorne, CB, Army Ordnance Depot
- Lieutenant-Colonel and Brevet Colonel (Temporary Brigadier-General) Wilkinson Dent Bird, CB, DSO, ADC
- Colonel Charles Henderson Melville, MB, Army Medical Service
- Colonel Malcolm David Graham, CB, Assistant Military Secretary, War Office
- Temporary Honorary Colonel Sir John Collie, MD, Army Medical Service
- Lieutenant-Colonel (Temporary Colonel) John George Adamson, retired pay, late King's Own Yorkshire Light Infantry
- Lieutenant-Colonel John Arthur Coghill Somerville, late Royal Sussex Regiment
- Lieutenant-Colonel Arthur de Courcy Scanlan, retired pay, Reserve of Officers, Royal Army Medical Corps
- Lieutenant-Colonel William Denziloe Sanderson, DSO, North Lancashire Regiment
- Temporary Honorary Lieutenant-Colonel Harry Richard Kenwood, MB, Royal Army Medical Corps, (Major, R A.M.C. (Territorial Force)
- Temporary Honorary Lieutenant-Colonel John Robertson, MD, Royal Army Medical Corps
- Lieutenant-Colonel John Ward, MP, Middlesex Regiment
- Temporary Lieutenant-Colonel John Charles Grant Ledingham, MB, Royal Army Medical Corps
- Lieutenant-Colonel and Honorary Colonel Alfred Briffa, King's Own Malta Regiment of Militia
- Major (Temporary Lieutenant-Colonel) Frederick Knight Essell, retired pay, Reserve of Officers, late East Kent Regiment
- Major (Temporary Lieutenant-Colonel) Henry Charles Bulkeley, DSO
- Temporary Lieutenant-Colonel Charles Morley Wenyon, MB, Royal Army Medical Corps
- Major and Brevet Lieutenant-Colonel (Temporary Colonel) Henry Andrew Micklem, DSO, Retired pay, Reserve of Officers, late Royal Engineers
- Major and Brevet Lieutenant-Colonel (Temporary Colonel) Charles Monk Gibbon, Royal Irish Fusiliers
- Major and Brevet Lieutenant-Colonel Robert May Wetherell, Duke of Cornwall's Light Infantry
- Lieutenant-Colonel Henry Godfrey Howorth, Royal Artillery
- Temporary Lieutenant-Colonel Arthur Treharne Andrews, Royal Engineers
- Temporary Lieutenant-Colonel George Basil Price, MD, Royal Army Medical Corps
- Major and Brevet Lieutenant-Colonel (Temporary Brigadier-General) Duncan le Geyt Pitcher, Indian Army
- Lieutenant-Colonel Stanley Clarence Halse, Royal Garrison Artillery
- Major and Brevet Lieutenant-Colonel William Dundas Dooner, Army Ordnance Department
- Major and Brevet Lieutenant-Colonel (Temporary Colonel) Frederick Walter Radcliffe, CIE, Dorsetshire Regiment
- Lieutenant-Colonel (Temporary Colonel) Arthur John Bromley Church, Army Pay Department
- Lieutenant-Colonel (Temporary Colonel) Hamlet Bush Toller, Army Pay Department
- Lieutenant-Colonel Cecil de Sausmarez, DSO, Royal Garrison Artillery
- Lieutenant-Colonel Henry Stewart Anderson, Royal Army Medical Corps
- Lieutenant-Colonel (Temporary Colonel) William Parry, Army Pay Department
- Temporary Lieutenant-Colonel Sir William Henry Houghton-Gastrell, MP, Army Service Corps
- Lieutenant-Colonel (Temporary Colonel) William Egerton Edwards, Royal Artillery
- Major and Brevet Lieutenant-Colonel (acting Lieutenant-Colonel) Kenneth Marten Body, Army Ordnance Department
- Lieutenant-Colonel (Temporary Colonel) Frederick Lindsay Lloyd, retired pay, Reserve of Officers
- Honorary Lieutenant-Colonel Alfred James Foster, Northumberland Fusiliers, Reserve of Officers, late Royal Garrison Artillery, Militia
- Lieutenant-Colonel Charles Richard Blackstone Owen, Royal Artillery
- Major and Brevet Lieutenant-Colonel (Temporary Colonel) Lewis Frederick Renny, DSO, Royal Dublin Fusiliers
- Temporary Lieutenant Robert Henry More, Reserve of Officers, late Imperial Yeomanry, Assistant Military Secretary, War Office
- Major (Temporary Lieutenant-Colonel) Charles Edward Norton, retired pay, Reserve of Officers, late Royal Engineers
- Major (Temporary Lieutenant-Colonel) the Honourable Alexander Victor Frederick Villiers Russell, MVO, Grenadier Guards
- Major (Temporary Lieutenant-Colonel) Lionel George Tempest Stone, Reserve of Officers, Royal Fusiliers
- Major (Temporary Lieutenant-Colonel) John Sedley Newton de Joux, South Staffordshire Regiment
- Major (Temporary Lieutenant-Colonel) Francis Vernon Willey, Yeomanry
- Major (Temporary Lieutenant-Colonel) James George Weir, Royal Field Artillery
- Temporary Major (Temporary Colonel) Arthur John Allen-Williams,MICE, Royal Engineers
- Captain (Temporary Colonel) Cecil Henry Whittington, Royal Flying Corps, Special Reserve
- Lieutenant-Colonel and Honorary Colonel (Honorary Brigadier-General) Hugh Henry John Williams Drummond, late Yeomanry
- Lieutenant-Colonel and Honorary Colonel Lionel Richard Cavendish Boyle, MVO, late Honourable Artillery Company
- Lieutenant-Colonel Stanley Hatch Page, Royal Field Artillery
- Major (Acting Lieutenant-Colonel) Osmond Robert McMullen, Royal Garrison Artillery
- Lieutenant-Colonel John Fred Keen, Royal Engineers
- Major Thomas Wardrop Griffith, MD Royal Army Medical Corps
- Lieutenant-Colonel (Honorary Surgeon-Colonel) (Temporary Colonel) William Mitchell Roocroft, Royal Army Medical Corps

===== Australian Imperial Force =====
- Major-General Cyril Brudenell Bingham White, CB, DSO, ADC
- Colonel George Walter Barber, DSO, Medical Corps
- Colonel Thomas Albert Blamey, DSO, Infantry
- Colonel (Temporary Brigadier-General) Charles Frederick Cox, CB, Commonwealth Military Forces
- Colonel (Temporary Brigadier-General) Walter Adams Coxen, DSO, Commonwealth Military Forces
- Colonel Robert Rupert Major Downes, Medical Corps
- Colonel (Temporary Brigadier-General) Walter Ramsay McNicoll, DSO, Infantry
- Colonel (Temporary Brigadier-General) Robert Smith, DSO, Infantry
- Lieutenant-Colonel Harold Edward Cohen, DSO, Field Artillery
- Lieutenant-Colonel (Temporary Colonel) Ernest Arthur Kendall, Royal Army Veterinary Corps
- Lieutenant-Colonel Raymond Lionel Leane, DSO, MC, Infantry
- Lieutenant-Colonel Edward Fowell Martin, DSO, Infantry
- Lieutenant-Colonel Athelstan Markham Martyn, DSO, Engineers
- Lieutenant-Colonel Charles Gordon Norman Miles, DSO, Field Artillery
- Lieutenant-Colonel Alexander Windeyer Ralston, DSO, Infantry
- Lieutenant-Colonel William Henry Scott, DSO, Light Horse Regiment
- Lieutenant-Colonel George Cattell Somerville, DSO
- Lieutenant-Colonel Walter Howard Tunbridge, CB, Army Service Corps
- Lieutenant-Colonel (Temporary Colonel) Arthur Thomas White, Army Medical Corps
- Lieutenant-Colonel Cyril Tracy Griffiths
- Senior Chaplain James Green
- Lieutenant-Colonel John Gordon, Army Medical Corps
- Temporary Lieutenant-Colonel Lionel James Hurley, General List, attached to Australian Imperial Force
- Lieutenant-Colonel George Hodges Knox
- Lieutenant-Colonel (Temporary Colonel) Douglas Murray McWhae, Army Medical Corps
- Honorary Lieutenant-Colonel James Anderson Murdoch, Army Medical Corps
- Lieutenant-Colonel (Temporary Colonel) Kenneth Smith, Army Medical Corps

===== Canadian Force =====
- Lieutenant-Colonel (Temporary Brigadier-General) Hugh Marshall Dyer, DSO, Infantry
- Lieutenant-Colonel (Temporary Brigadier-General) William Antrobus Griesbach, DSO, Infantry
- Lieutenant-Colonel (Temporary Brigadier-General) Frederic William Hill, DSO, Infantry
- Major and Brevet Lieutenant-Colonel (Temporary Brigadier-General) James Howden MacBrien, DSO, Dragoons
- Lieutenant-Colonel (Temporary Brigadier-General) Charles Henry MacLaren, DSO, Artillery
- Major (Temporary Lieutenant-Colonel) Howard Lionel Bodwell, DSO, Pioneers
- Major (Temporary Lieutenant-Colonel) Édouard de Bellefeuille Panet, DSO, Artillery
- Colonel John Alexander Armstrong
- Colonel (Brigadier-General) Ernest Charles Ashton
- Colonel Kenneth Cameron, Army Medical Corps
- Colonel George Septimus Rennie, Army Medical Corps
- Colonel Wallace Arthur Scott, Army Medical Corps
- Colonel Walter Langmuir Watt, Army Medical Corps
- Lieutenant-Colonel James Louis Regan, Royal Army Pay Corps
- Major (Temporary Lieutenant-Colonel) John Andrew Amyot, Army Medical Corps
- Major (Temporary Lieutenant-Colonel) Bernard Rickart Hepburn, Forestry Corps
- Temporary Honorary Major George Anderson Wells, Chaplain Services

===== New Zealand Force =====
- Lieutenant-Colonel Norris Stephen Falla, DSO, New Zealand Field Artillery
- Lieutenant-Colonel George Thompson Hall, Army Service Corps
- Major Thomas Henry Dawson, Infantry
- Major (Temporary Lieutenant-Colonel) Thomas Mill, MB, FRCS, Medical Corps
- Major Norton Francis, Motor Service Corps

===== South African Force =====
- Colonel Stanley Archibald Markham Pritchard, Native Labour Corps

===== Colonial List =====
- Philip Arnold Anthony, General Manager of the Federated Malay States Railways
- Algernon Edward Aspinall, Secretary, The West India Committee
- Lieutenant-Colonel Louis Edward Barnett, New Zealand Medical Corps
- Harry Fagg Batterbee, of the Colonial Office, Private Secretary to the Secretary of State for the Colonies
- Rodolphe Boudreau, Clerk of the Privy Council for Canada
- Peter Joseph McDermott, ISO, Under-Secretary, Chief Secretary's Deptartment, State of Queensland
- Arthur Mews, Deputy Colonial Secretary, Newfoundland
- The Honourable William Bispham Propsting, Attorney-General and Minister for Railways of the State of Tasmania
- Theodorus Gustaff Truter, Commissioner of Police, Union of South Africa
- Robert Walter, Colonial Secretary of the Colony of British Honduras
- Jeremiah Wilson, Postmaster-General, Union of South Africa

===== Diplomatic and Overseas Residents =====
- John Charles Tudor Vaughan, MVO, Counsellor at His Majesty's Embassy at Madrid
- James William Ronald Macleay, Counsellor of Embassy in His Majesty's Diplomatic Service
- Dayrell Eardley Montague Crackanthorpe, Counsellor to His Majesty's Legation at Athens
- Edward Henry John Leslie, of the Foreign Office
- Hugh Gurney, MVO, First Secretary to His Majesty's Legation at Copenhagen
- Guy Harold Locock, of the Foreign Office, attached to the Department of Commercial Intelligence

===== Honorary Companions =====
- His Highness Daudi Chwa, Kabaka of Buganda
- Louis Antonio Andrade, District Commissioner for the Island of Zanzibar

=== The Most Eminent Order of the Indian Empire ===
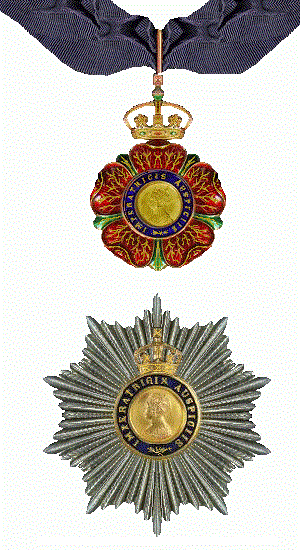
Riband, badge and star of the Knight Grand Cmdr. of the Order of the Indian Empire

==== Knight Grand Commander (GCIE) ====
- His Highness Maharajadhiraja Sawai Tukoji Rao Holkar Bahadur, of Indore.

==== Knight Commander (KCIE) ====
- John Barry Wood, CSI, CIE, Indian Civil Service, Political Secretary to the Government of India in the Foreign and Political Department, and an Additional Member of the Council of the Governor-General for making Laws and Regulations
- Bertram Sausmarez Carey, CSI, CIE, VD, Burma Commission, Commissioner, Sagaing, Burma, and a Member of the Council of the Lieutenant-Governor for making Laws and Regulations
- Alfred Hamilton Grant, CSI, CIE, Indian Civil Service, Foreign Secretary to the Government of India in the Foreign and Political Department, and an Additional Member of the Council of the Governor-General for making Laws and Regulations
- His Highness Raja Bir Indra Singh, of Rajgarh.
- His Highness Raja Sir Bhure Singh, KCSI, CIE, of Chamba
- His Highness Raja Bhim Sen, of Suket
- Captain His Highness Rana Ranjit Singh, of Barwani
- Majaraja Bir Mitradaya Singh Deo, of Sonpur
- Raja Hari Singh, Commander-in-Chief of the Kashmir Army

===== Honorary Knight Commander =====
- Abdul Karim Fadthli bin Ah, Sultan of Al Hauta (Lahej)

==== Companion (CIE) ====
- Arthur Herbert Ley, Indian Civil Service, Officiating Secretary, Commerce and Industry Department, Government of India
- Peter Henry Clutterbuck, VD, Indian Forest Service, Chief Conservator of Forests, United Provinces, and a Member of the Council of the Lieutenant-Governor for making Laws and Regulations
- James Donald, Indian Civil Service, Secretary to Government of Bengal, Financial Department, and an Additional Member of the Council of the Governor for making Laws and Regulations
- William Woodward Hornell, Indian Educational Service, Director of Public Instruction, Bengal, and an Additional Member of the Council of the Governor for making Laws and Regulations
- Harchandrai Vishandas, Pleader, Karachi, President of the Municipal Corporation and an Additional Member of the Council of the Governor of Bombay for making Laws and Regulations
- Thomas Ryan, Finance Accounts Department, Secretary to the Indian Munitions Board
- Arthur William Botham, Indian Civil Service, Second Secretary to the Chief Commissioner, Assam, and a Member of the Council of the Chief Commissioner for making Laws and Regulations
- Lieutenant-Colonel and Brevet Colonel Henry Francis Cleveland, VHS, Indian Medical Service, Deputy Director-General, Indian Medical Service
- Augustus Henry Deane, VD, His Majesty's Consul for Pondicherry and Karikal
- Lieutenant-Colonel Bawa Jiwan Singh, Indian Medical Service, Inspector-General of Prisons, Bihar and Orissa, and an Additional Member of the Council of the Lieutenant-Governor for making Laws and Regulations
- Lieutenant-Colonel William Byan Lane, Indian Medical Service, Inspector-General of Prisons, Central Provinces
- Harry Nelson Heseltine, Civil Accounts Department, Accountant-General for Railways, India
- Alexander Langley, Indian Civil Service, Deputy Commissioner of Hoshiarpur, Punjab
- Lieutenant-Colonel Henry Smith, MD, Indian Medical Service, Civil Surgeon, Amritsar, Punjab
- Lieutenant-Colonel Francis William Hallowes, Supply and Transport Corps, Director of Farms, India
- Major Henry Coddington Brown, Indian Medical Service, Assistant Director, Central Research Institute, Kasauli
- Robert Colquhoun Boyle, Indian Police, Commandant, Frontier Constabulary, North-West Frontier Province
- Lewis Wynne Hartley, Income-Tax Commissioner, Bombay
- Raja Sayyid Abu Jafar, Taluqdar of Pirpur, in the Fyzabad District of Oudh, United Provinces
- Rai Bahadur Pandit Gopinath, Member of Council, Jaipur State, Rajputana
- Jhala Sri Mansinghji Suraj Sinhji, Dewan of Dhrangadhra, Kathiawar, Bombay Presidency
- Khan Bahadur Khan Ahmad Shah, Honorary Sub-Judge and Honorary Magistrate, Jullundur, Punjab
- Assistant Surgeon Kedar Nath Das, MD, Professor of Midwifery, Campbell Medical School, Calcutta
- Brigadier-General John Latham Rose, Indian Army, Officiating Inspector-General, Imperial Service Troops
- Lieutenant-Colonel Roger Lloyd Kennion, Indian Army, Political Department, Consul at Kermanshah
- Lieutenant-Colonel Hugh Augustus Keppel Gough, Indian Army, Political Department, Consul at Shiraz, Persian Gulf
- Temporary Major John Arnold Wallinger, DSO, Indian Police
- Capt. Edward William Charles Noel, Indian Army, His Britannic Majesty's Vice-Consul, Ahwaz, and Assistant to Political Resident in Persian Gulf
- His Highness Maharaja Tashi Naingyal, of Sikkim
- Sao Kawn Kiao Intaleng, Sawbwa of Kengtung

=== Imperial Order of the Crown of India ===
- Her Highness Maji Sahiba Girraj Kaur, of Bharatpur

=== The Royal Victorian Order ===
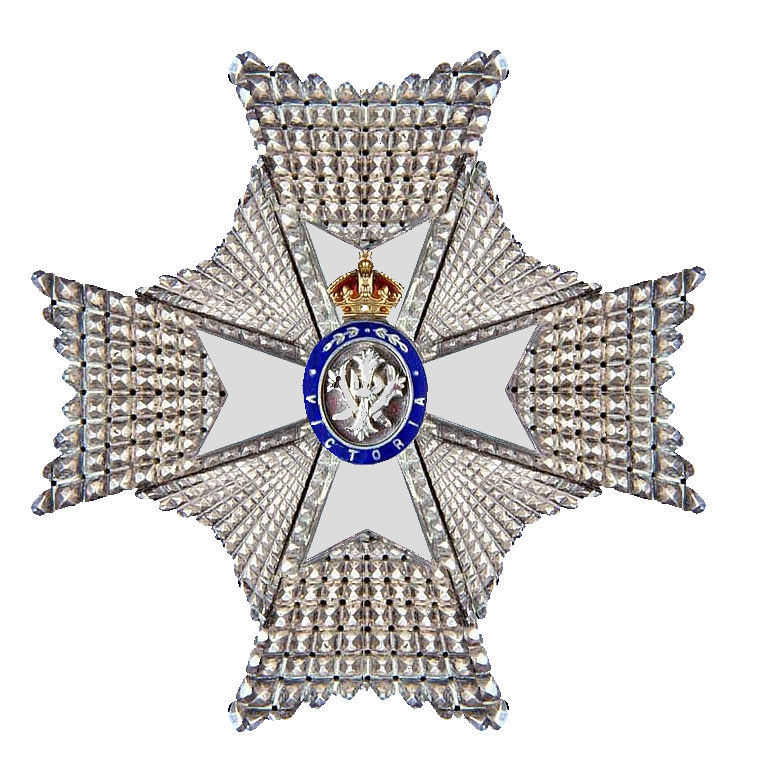
Insignia of a Knight / Dames Cmdr. of the Royal Victorian Order

==== Knight Grand Cross of the Royal Victorian Order (GCVO) ====
- His Highness Maharaja-dhiraja Maharana Sir Fateh Singh Bahadur, of Udaipur, GCSI, GCIE
- The Rt. Hon. James, Viscount Bryce, OM
- Sir Bertrand Edward Dawson, KCVO, CB, MD (dated 22 December 1917)

==== Knight Commander of the Royal Victorian Order (KCVO) ====
- Sir Charles Edward Troup, KCB
- Lieutenant-Colonel Hugh Mallinson Rigby, FRCS, Royal Army Medical Corps (dated 22 December 1917)

==== Commander of the Royal Victorian Order (CVO) ====
- Sidney West Harris, CB
- Matthew Walter Gibson, MVO, ISO
- John Leonard Bolden

==== Member of the Royal Victorian Order, 4th class (MVO) ====
- Lieutenant-Colonel Wyndham Raymond Portal, DSO (dated 20 December 1917)
- Staff Surgeon Louis Greig, Royal Navy (dated 22 December 1917)
- Lieutenant-Colonel John Cyril Giffard Alers Hankey
- Captain Augustus Frederick Liddell, late Royal Artillery

=== The Most Excellent Order of the British Empire ===
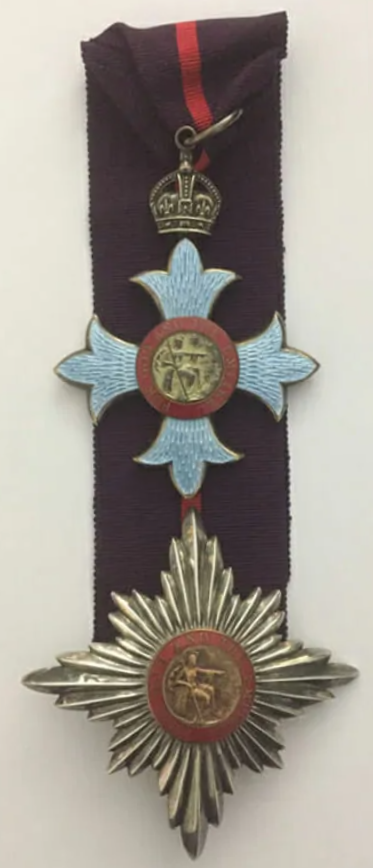
Knight Commander of the Order of the British Empire, insignia 1917–35

==== Dame Grand Cross of the Order of the British Empire (GBE) ====
===== Civil Division =====
- Her Majesty, Queen Alexandra
- Margaret, Baroness Ampthill, CI, President of the Bedfordshire Branch of the British Red Cross Society; Member of Council, British Red Cross Society; Head of the Voluntary Aid Detachment Department, Devonshire House
- Edith Isabel Benyon, President of the Berkshire Branch of the British Red Cross Society; Commandant of Englefield House Hospital, near Reading
- Aimee Evelyn, Lady Dawson, Joint Honorary Secretary, Queen Mary's Needlework Guild
- Violet Hermione, Duchess of Montrose, President of the Scottish Branch of the British Red Cross Society
- Mary Elizabeth, Viscountess Northcliffe, Member of the Joint Committee of the British Red Cross-Society and Order of St. John of Jerusalem; Donor and Administrator of Lady Northcliffe's Hospital for Officers

====== Dominion of New Zealand ======
- Her Excellency Annette Louise, Countess of Liverpool

====== British India ======
- Her Highness Nawab Sultan Jahan Begum GCSI GCIE CI of Bhopal, in recognition of Services rendered by the Native States of India during the War.

==== Knight Grand Cross of the Order of the British Empire (GBE) ====
===== Civil Division =====
- Sir Thomas Dunlop, Bart, Lord Provost of Glasgow
- William Henry Ellis, Master Cutler of Sheffield
- Sir Richard Charles Garton, Founder of the Garton Foundation for Promoting the Study of International Policy and Economics; Honorary Treasurer of the Trust Fund Committee of Queen Mary's Hostel
- The Rt. Hon. Sir David Harrel, KCB, KCVO, ISO, Chairman of the Committee on Production
- Sir Robert Arundell Hudson, Treasurer and Financial Director of the Joint Committee of the British Red Cross Society and the Order of St. John of Jerusalem in England
- Col. Sir Arthur Hamilton Lee, KCB, MP, Director-General of Food Production
- Sir William Plender

====== Egypt and the Sudan ======
- General Sir Francis Reginald Wingate, GCB, GCVO, KCMG, DSO, His Majesty's High Commissioner for Egypt

====== British India ======
In recognition of Services rendered by the Native States of India during the War —

- Lieutenant-General His Highness Maharajadhiraja Sir Pratap Singh Bahadur, GCSI, GCIE, of Jammu and Kashmir
- Major-General His Highness Maharajadhiraja Sir Sawai Madho Singh Bahadur, GCSI, GCIE, GCVO, of Jaipur
- Lieutenant-Colonel His Highness Maharao Sir Umed Singh Bahadur, GCSI GCIE, of Kotah
- Lieutenant-Colonel His Highness Maharahadhiraja Sri Sir Bhupindar Singh Mahindar Bahadur, GCIE, of Patiala

==== Dame Commander of the Order of the British Empire (DBE) ====
===== Civil Division =====
- The Hon. Eva Isabella Henrietta Anstruther, Organiser of Soldiers Libraries
- Caroline, Lady Arnott, Vice-President, Soldiers and Sailors Help Society, Dublin
- Maud Burnett, Town Councillor of Tynemouth
- Alice Mary Godman
- Agnes Lowndes, Lady Jekyll, Head of Stores Department, Order of St. John of Jerusalem
- Adelaide Livingstone, Secretary of the Government Committee on the Treatment by the Enemy of British Prisoners of War
- Ethel Locke King, Vice-President of North Surrey Division and Assistant County Director, Surrey, British Red Cross and Order of St. John of Jerusalem
- Flora, Lady Lugard, Joint Founder of the War Refugees Committee, and Founder of the Lady Lugard Hospitality Committee
- Margaret Ker Pryse-Rice, President, Carmarthenshire Branch of the British Red Cross Society
- Rosamond Cornelia Gwladys, Viscountess Ridley, Donor and Administrator, Lady Ridley's Hospital for Officers
- Edith Harriet, Lady Sclater, President of Lady Sclater's Work Room and Smokes Fund
- Olive Crofton, Lady Smith-Dorrien, President of the Hospital Bag Fund
- Janet Stancomb-Wills
- May Webster, Chairman of the British Women's Hospitals Committee; Chairman of the Three Arts Women's Employment Fund

====== Commonwealth of Australia ======
- Madame Melba, for services in organising patriotic work

====== Newfoundland ======
- Margaret Agnes, Lady Davidson, for services in connection with the Women's Patriotic Association

==== Knight Commander of the Order of the British Empire (KBE) ====
===== Military Division =====
====== Army ======
- James Galloway, CB, Army Medical Service, Chief Commissioner for Medical Services, Ministry of National Service
- Brigadier-General Louis Charles Jackson, CB, CMG, Late Controller of the Trench Warfare Research Department, Ministry of Munitions
- John Seymour Lloyd, CMG, Director General of Recruiting

===== Civil Division =====
- Francis Arthur Aglen, Inspector-General of the Chinese Maritime Customs
- Frank Baillie, Director of National Aeroplane Factory, Toronto
- Clement Anderson Montague-Barlow MP, LLD
- John Field Beale, Vice-Chairman, Royal Commission on Wheat Supplies; Chairman of Allied Wheat Executive
- Colonel Sir George Thomas Beatson, KCB, , DL, VD, Chairman, Scottish Branch, British Red Cross Society
- Walter Becker
- Andrew Caird, Administrator, New York Headquarters of the British War Mission to the United States of America
- James Cantlie MB, FRCS, Member of Council and of Executive Committee, British Red Cross Society
- Colonel Charles Frederick Close, CB, CMG, Director-General of the Ordnance Survey of the United Kingdom
- Alfred Thomas Davies, CB, Founder and Honorary Director of the British Prisoners of War Book Scheme
- Joseph Davies, Representative for Wales and Monmouthshire of the Cabinet Committee for Prevention of Unemployment and Distress
- William Henry Davison
- Alfred Hull Dennis, CB, Assistant Treasury Solicitor
- The Rt. Hon. Willoughby Hyett Dickinson, MP, Chairman of the Soldiers Dependants' Assessment Appeals Committee
- William Don, Lord Provost of Dundee
- Arthur John Dorman, Chairman of Messrs. Dorman, Long and Co., of Middlesbrough
- Bignell George Elliott
- Herbert Trustram Eve, Chairman of the Forage Committee
- Walter Morley Fletcher, MD, DSc, FRS, Secretary of the Medical Research Committee
- Sir William Bower Forwood
- Lieutenant-Colonel Henry Fowler, CBE, Chief Mechanical Engineer to the Midland Railway; Superintendent of the Royal Aircraft Factory, Farnborough
- Colonel Alexander Gibb, Royal Engineers, of the firm of Messrs. Easton, Gibb and Son
- Kenneth Weldon Goadby, MRCS, LRCP, Member of the War Office Committee for the Study of Tetanus
- Arthur Horne Goldfinch, Director of Raw Materials, Department of the Surveyor-General of Supply, War Office
- William Athelstane Meredith Goode, Honorary Secretary of the National Committee for Relief in Belgium
- Alexander Gracie, MVO, Managing Director of the Fairfield Shipbuilding and Engineering Company, Ltd.
- Sir William Grey-Wilson, KCMG, Chairman of the Central Committee for Patriotic Organisations
- Connop Guthrie, Representative of the Director of Transports in the United States of America
- Lieutenant-Colonel Frederick Hall, MP
- Arthur Ambrose Hall Harris, Acting Director of Overseas Transport to the Canadian Government; Representative of the Director of Transports in Canada
- Frederick Ness Henderson, Member of the Admiralty Shipbuilding Council
- Philip Gutterez Henriques, Deputy Controller of Munitions Finance
- Ernest Varvill Hiley, Late Deputy Director of the National Service Department
- Colonel Arthur Richard Holbrook, VD, DL, JP
- Lieutenant-Colonel Robert Stevenson Horne, KC, Royal Engineers, Director of Materials and Priority, Controller's Department, Admiralty
- George Burton Hunter, DSc, Chairman of Messrs. Swan, Hunter & Wigham Richardson & Company, Ltd., Newcastle upon Tyne
- Gustave Jarmay, Managing Director of Messrs. Brunner, Mond & Co., Ltd.
- Edgar Rees Jones, MP, Superintendent, Priority Department, Ministry of Munitions
- Roderick Jones, Managing Director, Reuter's Telegram Company, Ltd.
- Charles Halestaff Kenderdine, Honorary Secretary and Treasurer, Queen Mary's Convalescent Auxiliary Hospitals, Roehampton
- Harry Livesey, Director of Navy Contracts, Admiralty; formerly Deputy Director of Inland Water Transport and Docks, War Office
- John Mann, Controller of Contracts, Ministry of Munitions
- Arthur Harold Marshall, MP, Chairman of the Central Building Board, of the Parliamentary Munitions Committee, and of the Parliamentary Recruiting Committee
- George Ernest May, Secretary to the Prudential Assurance Company; Manager of the American Dollar Securities Committee
- Peter Hannay McClelland, Member of Advisory Board, Surveyor General of Supply Department, War Office
- James McKechnie, Managing Director of Messrs. Vickers, Ltd., Barrow
- Colonel Andrew Muter John Ogilvie, CB, Royal Engineers, Director of Army Signals (Home Defence); Second Secretary to the Post Office
- Thomas Henry Penson, Chairman of the War Trade Intelligence Department
- Edward Penton, Junior, in charge of Boot Section, Royal Army Clothing Department
- Frederick George Panizzi Preston, Chairman of Messrs. J. Stone & Company, Ltd., Deptford
- Sir Frederick Alexander Robertson, Chairman of the Central Council of United Alien Relief Societies
- Robert Robertson, DSc, FRS Superintending Chemist, Research Deptartment, Woolwich Arsenal
- Herbert Babington Rowell, Member of the Admiralty Shipbuilding Council
- Harry Smith, Chairman of the Keighley Board of Management, Ministry of Munitions
- Charles John Stewart, Public Trustee
- Thomas James Storey, Member of the Committee and Chairman of the Classification Committed of Lloyd's Register of Shipping
- Percy Kendall Stothert, Chairman of the West of England Board of Management, Ministry of Munitions
- The Rt. Hon. Sir Thomas Vezey Strong, KCVO, Chairman, City of London Tribunal
- Lieutenant-Colonel Campbell Stuart, Vice-Chairman of London Headquarters of British Mission to the United States of America
- Charles Sykes, Director of Wool Textile Production and Chairman of the Board of Control of the Worsted Woollen Trades
- William Henry Thompson MD, MCh, DSc, Scientific Adviser to the Ministry of Food
- William Rowan-Thomson, Director of Auxiliary Ships Engines, Controller's Department, Admiralty
- Frank Warner, President of the Silk Association
- Lieutenant-Colonel Alfred Cholmeley Earle Welby, Secretary of the Royal Patriotic Fund Corporation

====== British India ======
- Maj. His Highness Raj Rajeshwar Maharajadhiraja Sumer Singh Bahadur, of Jodhpur

====== Commonwealth of Australia ======
- James William Barrett, CMG, MD, for services in connection with the Australian Branch of the British Red Cross Society in Egypt, etc.
- Rear-Admiral William Clarkson, CMG, Royal Australian Navy, for services in connection with the control and reorganisation of coastal shipping
- Edward Owen Cox, Chairman, Overseas Shipping Committee
- Lieutenant-Colonel George Steward, for services to the Commonwealth Government

====== Dominion of New Zealand ======
- Sir William Lee, Baron Plunket, GCMG, KCVO, for services in connection with the New Zealand War Contingent Association

====== Egypt and the Sudan ======
- Major (temporary Major-General) Lee Oliver FitzMaurice Stack, CMG, Reserve of Officers, Acting Sirdar and Governor-General of the Sudan

====== Newfoundland ======
- The Hon. Patrick Thomas McGrath, LLD, President of the Legislative Council, Food Controller, Secretary of the Patriotic Fund, and Chairman of the Pensions and Disabilities Board

====== Crown Colonies, Protectorates, etc. ======
- The Most Reverend Maurus Caruana, Archbishop, Bishop of Malta
- Sir Everard Ferdinand im Thurn, KCMG, CB, Vice-Chairman, King George and Queen Mary's Club for the Oversea Forces
- Brigadier-General Sir William Henry Manning, KCMG, CB, Captain-General and Governor-in-Chief of the Island of Jamaica
- Lawrence Aubrey Wallace, CMG, Administrator of Northern Rhodesia
- Sir Arthur Henderson Young, GCMG, Governor and Commander-in-Chief of the Straits Settlements

====== Honorary Knight Commander ======
- His Highness Ibrahim, Sultan of the State and Territory of Johor GCMG

==== Commander of the Order of the British Empire (CBE) ====
===== Military Division =====
- Lieutenant-Colonel John Hubback Anderson, Assistant Director of Medical Services, Australian Imperial Force
- Colonel Frederick John Angell, Assistant Director of Ordnance Services, Southern Command
- Lieutenant-Colonel James Forrest Halkett Carmichael, Assistant Controller, Raw Materials (Non-Ferrous), Ministry of Munitions
- Major Augustus Basil Holt Clerke, Royal Artillery, Director, Messrs. Hadfields, Ltd., Sheffield
- Major The Hon. Leonard Harrison Cripps, 4th Hussars; Assistant Controller, Stores Department, Ministry of Munitions
- Colonel Stuart Davidson, Royal Engineers, Chief Technical Examiner for Works Services, War Office
- Lieutenant-Colonel Robert Maxwell Dennistoun, KC, Deputy Judge Advocate General, Canadian Forces
- Colonel Sir William Yorke Foster, Bt, Late Assistant Adjutant General, Southern Command
- Colonel Joseph Gaskell, VD, DL, JP, Vice-Chairman (Acting Chairman), Glamorgan Territorial Force Association
- Brevet Colonel St. John Corbet Gore, CB
- Lieutenant-Colonel Geoffrey Gladstone Helbert, Staff of High Commissioner for South Africa
- Major Thomas Gerard Hetherington. Services in connection with the origination of Tanks
- Lieutenant-Colonel John Tweedy Lewtas, Commissioner for Medical Services, Ministry of National Service
- Colonel James Reynolds McLean, Deputy Director-General of Recruiting
- Colonel Valentine Matthews VD Inspector of Rest Houses, London District
- Colonel Robert Dawson Rudolf. Consultant in Medicine, Canadian Army Medical Corps
- Colonel The Hon. George John Smith, Assistant Director of Contracts, Admiralty; New Zealand Military Forces
- Colonel Robert Ward Tate, Adjutant-General to the New Zealand Forces
- Lieutenant-Colonel Francis William Towle, Royal Army Service Corps; Inspector of Quarter-Master General's Services; Member of the Tobacco and Matches Control Board
- Colonel Gerald Verner White, Director of Timber Operations, Canadian Forestry Corps
- Lieutenant-Colonel John Williams, Australian Imperial Force; Commanding Anzac Provost Corps

====== For services in connection with the War in France, Egypt and Salonika ======
- Hugh Garvin Goligher, Financial Adviser, British Expeditionary Force
- Helen Charlotte Isabella Gwynne-Vaughan, Chief Controller, Queen Mary's Army Auxiliary Corps
- Lieutenant-Colonel (Honorary Colonel) Edward William Horne
- Lieutenant-Colonel Sydney George Partridge, Army Printing and Stationery Services, General Headquarters, France

===== Civil Division =====
- John Arthur Aiton, Chairman, Derbyshire Munitions Board of Management
- Major Charles Aldington, Superintendent of the Line, Great Western Railway
- Ernest Joshua Allen, Director, Railway Materials, Ministry of Munitions
- Ernest King Allen, Assistant Public Trustee
- Richard William Allen, JP, Director and Manager of Messrs. W. H. Allen, Son & Company, Bedford
- Lawrence Alma-Tadema, Joint Founder of the Polish Relief Fund for Great Britain
- Adelaide Mary Anderson, Principal Lady Inspector of Factories
- William James Anderson, Honorary Treasurer, Scottish Branch, British Red Cross Society
- Mildred Harriet, Lady Anstruther
- John Apsey, Manager, Constructive Department, H.M. Dockyard, Portsmouth
- Cecil Henry Armitage, DL, County Director, Derbyshire, British Red Cross and Order of St. John of Jerusalem
- George Henry Ashdown, ISO, Deputy Director of Stores, Admiralty
- Major Frank Ashley, British Red Cross Commissioner, Malta
- Ellen, Lady Askwith, Ladies Auxiliary Committee (Munitions Section), Y.M.C.A.
- Frederick Joseph Bacon, FSI, Treasury Valuer and Inspector of Rates
- Bernal Bagshawe, Chairman, Leeds Forge Company Ltd., Leeds
- David Bain, Controller of Timber Supplies for Gun Ammunition Filling Department, Ministry of Munitions
- Frank Baines MVO Principal Architect, H.M. Office of Works
- James Alan Noel Barlow, Deputy Controller, Labour Supply Department, Ministry of Munitions
- Benjamin Barrios
- Oscar Theodore Barrow, CSI, Assistant Controller of Finance, Ministry of Munitions
- Colonel Thomas Elwood Lindesay Bate, CIE, Late County Secretary, County of London, British Red Cross and Order of St. John of Jerusalem
- John Harper Bean, Director, Messrs. A. Harper, Sons and Bean Ltd., Dudley
- Gerald Bellhouse, Deputy Chief Inspector of Factories
- Blanche Vere, Countess of Bessborough, Honorary Secretary, Y.M.C.A. Auxiliary Committee for France
- Alfred Carleton Blyth, Managing Director, Hayes Filling Factory, Ministry of Munitions
- Hereward Kenius Brackenbury, Manager of Torpedo Shops, Messrs. Sir W. G. Armstrong, Whitworth & Company, Ltd.
- Thomas John Bradley, Principal Clerk, Exchequer and Audit Department
- Benjamin Broadbent, JP
- Lieutenant-Colonel Alfred Claude Bromhead
- Arthur David Brooks, Lord Mayor of Birmingham; Chairman of Birmingham Local Tribunal
- James Brown, Deputy Chairman and Managing Director, Scott's Shipbuilding and Engineering Company, Ltd.
- Francis Morgan Bryant, MVO, ISO, Secretary of H.M. the King's Private Secretary's Office
- James Herbert Brydon, Acting County Director, Honorary County Secretary and Treasurer, Cheshire, British Red Cross and Order of St. John of Jerusalem
- Cecil Lindsay Budd, Chairman, Virgin Metals Committee, Ministry of Munitions
- Kathleen Burke
- Captain Sydney Bernard Burney, Assistant Director General of Voluntary Organizations
- Geoffrey Butler, Department of Information, Foreign Office
- Thomas Sivewright Catto, Ministry of Shipping
- Fernley John Chamberlain, Assistant Secretary and Chief of Staff to the National Council of Young Men's Christian Associations
- Brigadier-General Harry Anthony Chandos-Pole-Gell, Chairman, Derbyshire War Agricultural Executive Committee
- Professor Frederic John Cheshire, Adviser on Scientific Side of Optical Munitions Branch, Ministry of Munitions
- Clementine Churchill, Ladies Auxiliary Committee (Munitions Section), Y.M.C.A.
- Major Augustus Basil Holt Clerke, Royal Artillery, Director, Messrs Hadfields, Ltd., Sheffield
- Maynard Willoughby Colchester-Wemyss, DL, JP, Acting Chief Constable of Gloucestershire
- Major Charles John Bowen Cooke, Chief Mechanical Engineer, London and North Western Railway
- Major Edwin Charles Cox, Superintendent of the Line, South Eastern and Chatham Railway
- Major Edward Yorke Daniel, Secretary of the Historical Section of the Committee of Imperial Defence
- Albert Davidson, Managing Director, Messrs. Hattersley and Davidson Ltd., Sheffield
- Charles Llewelyn Davies, Assistant Paymaster-General
- Ernest Davies, Deputy Inspector under the Aliens Act
- Henry William Carless Davis, Deputy Chairman, War Trade Intelligence Department
- John Samuel Champion Davis, DL, VD County Director, Devonshire, British Red Cross and Order of St. John of Jerusalem
- Howard d'Egville, Honorary Secretary of the United Kingdom Branch of the Empire Parliamentary Association; Commissioner under the Military Service (Civil Liabilities) Committee
- Edward Evershed Dendy, Chairman, Semi-manufactured Metals Committee, Ministry of Munitions
- Arthur Lewis Dixon, Assistant Secretary, Home Office
- Captain The Hon. Charles Joseph Thaddeus Dormer, Royal Navy, Chairman of the Admiralty Licensing Sub-Committee, War Trade Dept.
- Colonel Charles William Ernest Duncombe, TD, County Director, West Yorkshire, British Red Cross and Order of St. John of Jerusalem
- Frances Hermia Durham, Chief Woman Inspector at Central Offices of Employment Department, Ministry of Labour
- Arthur James Dyke, Assistant Secretary, Board of Customs and Excise
- Agnes Murray Ebden, Deputy President, Hastings Division, British Red Cross and Order of St. John of Jerusalem
- Ethel Edgar, Ladies Auxiliary Committee (Munitions Section), Y.M.C.A.
- George Edwards, Auditor and Controller, Imperial Munitions Board, Canada
- William James Evans, Principal Clerk, Secretary's Deptartment, Admiralty
- Peter Dewar Ewing, General Manager, Ailsa Shipbuilding Company, Troon
- John Edward Ferard, Assistant Secretary (Officiating Secretary), Judicial and Public Department, India Office
- Captain Matthew Benjamin Dipnall Ffinch, JP, Assistant Chief Constable in Charge of Special Constabulary, Essex
- William John Fieldhouse, JP
- Edward FitzGerald, Assistant to Chairman, Imperial Munitions Board, Canada
- William Joseph Fitzherbert-Brockholes, DL, JP, Chairman, Lancashire War Agricultural Executive Committee
- Lieutenant-Colonel Herbert Lindsay Fitzpatrick, Red Cross Commissioner, Salonika
- Horace Shepherd Folker, Head of Equipment Department, Headquarters Staff, British Red Cross Society, London
- Major John Henry Follows, Acting General Superintendent, Midland Railway
- Edward Rodolph Forber, Secretary, Military Service (Civil Liabilities) Committee
- George Herbert Fowler, Hydrographic Department, Admiralty
- Captain George Charles Frederick, Royal Navy, Shipping Intelligence Officer, Liverpool
- George Samuel Fry, Formerly Accountant-General of the Board of Trade; Member of the Coal Exports Committee
- Thomas Alexander Fyfe, Sheriff-Substitute of Lanarkshire; Chairman, Glasgow Munitions Tribunal
- Frank Walls Garnett, JP, President of the Royal College of Veterinary Surgeons
- Lieutenant-Colonel Frank Garrett, TD, Chairman, Messrs. Garrett and Sons, Leiston
- Heathcote William Garrod, Deputy Controller, Labour Regulation Department, Ministry of Munitions
- Laura Gwendolen Gascoigne, Commandant, Lotherton Hall Auxiliary Hospital, Aberford, West Yorkshire
- Stephen Gaselee, Department of Information, Foreign Office
- Colonel Joseph Gaskell, VD, DL, JP, Vice-Chairman (Acting Chairman), Glamorgan Territorial Force Association.
- Mager Frederic Gauntlett, CIE, Late Secretary, Shipyard Labour Department, Admiralty
- Ioan Gwilym Gibbon, Principal of the Department dealing with Military Service Tribunals, Local Government Board
- Victoria Florence de Burgh Gibbs, Vice-President, Long Ashton Division of Somersetshire, British Red Cross and Order of St. John of Jerusalem
- David Gilmour, Formerly Resident Engineer, now Member of Board of Management, H.M. Factory, Gretna, Ministry of Munitions
- Henry Glendinning, Chemical Director, Messrs. Brunner Mond and Co., Limited, Northwich
- Lewis Gordon, Deputy Controller, Small Arms Ammunition, Ministry of Munitions
- Colonel George Joachim, Viscount Goschen, Director of Labour Division, Food Production Department
- Robert Ernest Graves, Deputy Commissioner of Trade Exemptions Department, Ministry of National Service
- Major William Wylie Grierson, Chief Engineer, Great Western Railway
- Rosamund, Lady Henry Grosvenor, Ladies Auxiliary Committee (Munitions Section), Y.M.C.A.
- Major Anselm Verner Lee Guise, Director of Stores, British Red Cross Society, Boulogne
- Frances Bett, Lady Hadfield, Donor and Administrator, No. 5 Hospital, Wimereux, France
- Arthur Edward Hadley, Assistant Controller of Inspection of Munitions, Ministry of Munitions
- Ernest Varley Haigh, Controller, Trench Warfare Supply Department, Ministry of Munitions
- Arthur Henry Hall, Director of Torpedoes and Mines Production, Controller's Department, Admiralty
- John Harrison, Chairman of the City of Edinburgh Local Tribunal
- Ralph Endersby Harwood, Secretary of the War Trade Statistical Department
- William Hawk, JP, Chairman, Cornwall War Agricultural Executive Committee
- Alfred Ernest William Hazel, LLD, Deputy Controller, Priority Department, Ministry of Munitions
- Alexander Pearce Higgins, LLD, Lecturer on International Law at Cambridge, and President of the Society of Public Teachers of Law
- Professor William Richard Hodgkinson, FRS, Professor of Chemistry and Metallurgy, Ordnance College, Woolwich
- Arthur William Holmes, Director of Contracts, Royal Commission on Wheat Supplies
- Collingwood Hope, KC, Chairman, Essex Appeal Tribunal
- John Wilson Hope, Chairman of the Committee for the Purchase of Army Camp Refuse
- Leonard Thomas Horne, Assistant Secretary, Ministry of Pensions
- Lancelot Worthy Horne, Superintendent of the Line, London & North Western Railway
- George Henry Hunt, ISO, Accountant, Treasury
- Summers Hunter, Member of the Admiralty Shipbuilding Council
- Cyril William Hurcomb, Deputy Director of Commercial Services, Ministry of Shipping
- Rear-Admiral Edward Fitzmaurice Inglefield, Royal Navy, Secretary of Lloyd's Register of Shipping
- Daniel Jackson, Partner and Head of Shipyard, Messrs. Denny Brothers, Dumbarton
- Lieutenant-Commander Basil Oliver Jenkins, RNVR, Member in charge of Aviation, British War Mission, United States of America
- Walter St. David Jenkins, Assistant Director of Contracts, Admiralty
- Harry Marshall Jonas, Member of Valuation Advisory Committee, Controlled Establishment Branch, Ministry of Munitions
- Charles Henry Jones, Registrar-General of Shipping and Seamen
- Frederick McCulloch Jowitt
- Harold Godfrey Judd, Deputy Controller, Contracts Department, Ministry of Munitions
- Walter George Kent, of Messrs. George Kent, Ltd., Luton
- Robert Killin, Superintendent of the Line, Caledonian Railway
- Alfred Clive Lawrence, Head of the Intelligence Branch of the Procurator-General's Department
- Florence Edith Victoria Leach, Controller of Inspections, Women's Army Auxiliary Corps
- Rudolf Gustav Karl Lempfert, FRMetS, Superintendent of the Forecast Division, Meteorological Office
- Norman Alexander Leslie, Ministry of Shipping
- Edgar Stanford London, Deputy Chief Inspector of Taxes, Inland Revenue
- Arthur Lucas, Deputy Director, Department of Import Restrictions, Board of Trade
- William Joseph Luke, Shipyard Director, Messrs. John Brown & Company, Ltd., Clydebank
- William Royse Lysaght, JP, Technical Adviser, Non-Ferrous Materials Department, Ministry of Munitions
- Horacio George Arthur Mackie, His Majesty's Consul-General, Buenos Aires
- James Borrowman MacLean, Controller, Gun Manufacture, Ministry of Munitions
- William Turner MacLellan, JP, Assistant Controller, Iron and Steel Production, Ministry of Munitions
- Frederick Larkins MacLeod, Adviser on Foreign Iron Ores, Ministry of Munitions
- Terence Charles Macnaghten, Principal Clerk, Colonial Office
- Charles Cornelius Maconochie, KC, Sheriff of the Lothians and Peebles; Chairman of the Lothian Appeal Tribunal
- Edmund John Maginness, MVO, Manager, Constructive Department, H.M. Dockyard, Chatham
- James Rochfort Maguire, Ladies Auxiliary Committee (Munitions Section), Y.M.C.A.
- George Malcolm
- Alfred Mansfield, Director of Oils and Fats
- James Marr, JP, Member of the Admiralty Shipbuilding Council
- Thomas Rodgerson Marsden, Managing Director, Messrs. Platt Brothers & Company, Oldham
- Wing-Captain Edward Alexander Dimsdale Masterman, Royal Naval Air Service
- Arthur Stanley Mather, JP, Chairman, Lancashire (West Derby Hundred) Appeal Tribunal
- Richard Edward Lloyd Maunsell, Mechanical Engineer, South Eastern and Chatham Railway
- Oliver Hill McCowen, LLB, Secretary in Charge of Y.M.C.A. work in France
- The Honourable Henry Duncan McLaren, MP, Director, Area Organisation, Ministry of Munitions
- William Bentley McMillan, JP, Provost of Greenock
- Harry Bell Measures, MVO, Director of Barrack Construction, War Office
- His Honour Judge Francis Hamilton Mellor, KC, Chairman, Lancashire (Salford Hundred) Appeal Tribunal
- Frank Herbert Mitchell, Assistant Director, Official Press Bureau
- Major Robert Mitchell, Director of Training, Ministry of Pensions
- William Mitchell-Thomson, MP, Director of the Restriction of Enemy Supplies Department
- Colonel James Alexander Lawrence Montgomery, British Red Cross Commissioner, East Africa
- Lieutenant-Colonel Charles Langbridge Morgan, Late Chief Engineer, London, Brighton and South Coast Railway
- Hopkin Morgan, JP, Chairman, Glamorganshire County Council; Mayor of Neath; Chairman, West Glamorganshire Appeal Tribunal
- Thomas Harry Mottram, Divisional Inspector of Mines; Chairman of Colliery Recruiting Courts, Yorkshire and North Midlands Division
- William Arthur Mount, MP, Civil Member of Claims Commission, War Office
- Conrad James Naef, Deputy Accountant-General of the Navy
- Daniel Neylan, Chief Accountant, War Office; late Financial Adviser to the Salonika Expeditionary Force
- Thomas Norton, DL, JP, Chairman, Yorkshire West Riding Appeal Tribunal
- Arthur Eugene O'Neill, Ministry of Shipping
- Lieutenant-Colonel Claude Bowes Palmer, DL, County Director, Northumberland and Durham, British Red Cross and Order of St. John of Jerusalem
- Major Edward Howard Thornbrough Parsons, Chief Constable, Metropolitan Police
- James Peech, Adviser on Shell Steel, Ministry of Munitions
- His Honour Judge George Bettesworth Piggott, Chairman of Special Local Tribunal for London and Member of London Appeal Tribunal
- Henry Howard Piggots, Assistant Secretary, Parliamentary and General, Ministry of Munitions
- Charles Ralph Pinder, Resident Engineer, H.M. Factory, Oldbury; formerly Construction Manager, H.M. Factory, Queensferry, and H.M. Factory, Avonmouth, Ministry of Munitions
- Henry Pledge, Assistant Director of Naval Construction, Admiralty
- William Jackson Pope, FRS, Professor of Chemistry, University of Cambridge; Member of Panel of Board of Invention and Research, Admiralty
- Helen Matilda, Lady Procter, Chairman, Munition Workers Welfare Committee, Y.W.C.A.
- James Railton, Partner in the Firm of Messrs. Topham, Jones and Railton
- Harry Rawson, DL, JP, Chairman, City of Edinburgh Territorial Force Association
- George Grey Rea, JP, Member of the President of the Board of Agriculture's Committee Food Production Advisory
- Lieutenant-Colonel Hugh Reid, VD, DL, Member of War Executive and of the Scottish National Red Cross and Ralston Hospital Committee of the Scottish Branch, British Red Cross Society
- Arthur John Relton, Member of the Aircraft Insurance Committee
- Brevet Lieutenant-Colonel Thomas Duncan Rhind, Controller of Statistics, Ministry of National Service
- John Richie Richmond, Managing Director of Messrs. J. M. Weir, Ltd., Cathcart
- Gervase Henry Roberts, Superintendent, Mechanical Engineering Department, Woolwich Arsenal
- John Robertson, Provost of the Burgh of Paisley; Chairman of the local National Service and Food Control Committees; Member of Appeal Tribunal
- William Robinson, Financial Secretary, India Office
- William Arthur Robinson, CB, Assistant Secretary, H.M. Office of Works
- Corisande Evelyn Vere, Baroness Rodney, Y.M.C.A. Worker
- Archibald John Campbell Ross, Member of the Admiralty Shipbuilding Council
- John Rowland, MVO, JP, Late Chief Commissioner of National Service, Wales
- Matthew Adkins Rundell, Government representative on the London group of War Risks Associations; Government representative on the Fishing Vessels War Risks Insurance Association
- Edward Russell Clarke, MBE, Expert Adviser to the Naval Staff on Wireless Telegraphy
- Nils Percy Patrick Sandberg, Director of Inspection of Steel (Land Service), Ministry of Munitions, and Associate Member of Ordnance Committee
- Charles John Ough Sanders, Superintendent for Wrecks and Loss of Life at Sea; in the Marine Department, Board of Trade
- Captain William Stephen Sanders, Secretary to the British Section of the International Socialist Party
- William Samuel Sarel, Assistant Accountant-General of the Navy
- Maj. Finlay Forbes Scott, Superintendent of the Line, London, Brighton and South Coast Railway
- Colonel John Scott-Riddell, MVO, TD, Red Cross Commissioner for North Eastern District of Scotland
- Albert Senior, JP, Principal Partner, Messrs. G., Senior & Sons, Ltd., Sheffield
- John Davenport Siddeley, Managing Director of the Siddeley-Deasy Co., Ltd.
- William Anker Simmons, JP, Agricultural Adviser, Ministry of Food
- Arthur William Smallwood, Assistant Director of Contracts, Admiralty
- Frederick Smith, Assistant Director of Materials and Priority, Controller's Department, Admiralty, New Zealand Expeditionary Force
- Launcelot Eustace Smith, Chairman and Managing Director, Messrs. Smith's Dock Company, Ltd., Tyne Branch
- Thomas Octave Murdoch Sopwith, Chairman and Test and Experimental Manager of Sopwith Aviation Co., Ltd.
- William Spens, Foreign Trade Department
- Ernest Edward William Squires, General Manager, Metropolitan Carriage, Wagon & Finance Company, Ltd., Birmingham
- Josiah Charles Stamp, DSc, Assistant Secretary to the Board of Inland Revenue
- Lockhart Stephens, MRCS, DL, County Director, Hampshire British Red Cross and Order of St. John of Jerusalem
- Frances Louise Stevenson, Private Secretary to the Prime Minister
- Thomas Henry Craig Stevenson, MD, Superintendent of Statistics, General Register Office
- Mary Margaret Stewart-Mackenzie
- William Chester Still, Senior Partner of Messrs. W. M. Still and Sons
- John William Stone, Surveyor of Lands, Director of Works Department, Admiralty
- Lucy Granville Streatfeild, Member of Soldiers Dependants Assessment Appeals Committee
- John Stuart, Managing Director, Messrs. Ross, Ltd., London
- The Honourable Violet Stuart-Wortley, Ladies Secretary to the Headquarters Committee, Y.M.C.A.
- The Honourable Reginald Gilbert Murray Talbot, Chairman, London Munitions Tribunal
- Frank Tatlow, Deputy General Manager, Midland Railway
- Lieutenant-Colonel Percy Crosland Tempest, Chief Engineer, South Eastern and Chatham Railway
- Captain William Hugh Tomasson, MVO Chief Constable of Nottinghamshire and Acting Inspector of Constabulary
- Wynn Harold Tregoning, Ministry of Shipping; a Member of the Ship Licensing Committee
- Joseph Harling Turner, JP
- John James Virgo, National Field Secretary to the Y.M.C.A.
- Lieutenant-Colonel David Wallace, CMG, Red Cross Commissioner for Eastern District of Scotland
- Hugh Walpole
- Evelyn Mayura Walters, Honorary Secretary, Kensington Division, British Red Cross and Order of St. John of Jerusalem; Organiser of the Weir Hospital, Balham
- Lady Susan Elizabeth Clementine Waring, Donor and Administrator, Auxiliary Hospital for Convalescent Officers, Lennel, Coldstream, Berwick
- Major Henry Angus Watson, General Superintendent, North Eastern Railway
- Alexander Strahan Watt
- Lawrence Weaver, Director of Supplies Division, Food Production Department
- Harry James Webb, Royal Corps of Naval Constructors; Chief Constructor and Superintendent, Dockyard Branch, Controller's Department, Admiralty
- Philip George Lancelot Webb, Deputy Controller of Petrol Department, Board of Trade
- Wilfred Howard Williams, Director of Inland Transport, Ministry of Munitions
- Colonel Frederic Herbert Williamson, Royal Engineers, Director of Army Postal Service (Home); Principal Clerk, Secretary's Office, General Post Office
- John William Willis-Bund, JP, Chairman, Worcestershire County Council; Chairman, Worcestershire Appeal Tribunal; Chairman, Worcestershire National Relief Fund
- Horace John Wilson, Secretary to Committee on Production, Ministry of Labour
- John James Withers
- Humbert Wolfe, Controller, Labour Regulation Department, Ministry of Munitions
- Edith Amelia, Baroness Wolverton, Ladies Auxiliary Committee (Munitions Section), Y.M.C.A.
- Professor Thomas Barlow Wood, Drapers Professor of Agriculture in the University of Cambridge; Adviser on Meat Production to the President of the Board of Agriculture, and Chief Executive Officer, Army Cattle Purchase Scheme
- Alfred Woodgate, Assistant Secretary to the Ministry of Shipping
- Raymond Wybrow Woods, Chief Clerk, Treasury Solicitor's Department
- Thomas Worthington, Late Head of the Commercial Intelligence Department of the Board of Trade
- Major Lionel Maling Wynch, CIE, Secretary to Red Cross Commissioner, France
- Lieutenant-Colonel Charles John Wyndham, Late County Director, Sussex, British Red Cross and Order of St. John of Jerusalem
- Harold Edgar Yarrow, Director of Messrs. Yarrow & Company
- John Horatio Yolland, Chief of Staff of County Director, Kent, British Red Cross and Order of St. John of Jerusalem
- George Udny Yule, Director of Requirements, Ministry of Food

====== For services in connection with the War in France, Egypt and Salonika ======
- Arthur Beagley Beavis, Financial Adviser, British Salonika Force
- Rachel Ward, Countess of Dudley, Honorary Superintendent, No. 32 Stationary Hospital, France; Honorary Superintendent, Expeditionary Force, Officers' Clubs and Rest Houses
- Lady Mabelle Annie Egerton, in charge of Station Coffee Stall, Rouen
- Robert Godfrey Peckitt, Chief Mechanical Engineer, Egyptian State Railways

====== British India ======
- Jeanie, Lady Meston, Head of the branch of the Red Cross in Allahabad
- Lieutenant-Colonel Frank Popham Young, CIE, Indian Army, Commissioner, Rawalpindi Division, Punjab
- Sir Robert Swan Highet, Agent, East Indian Railway, Calcutta
- Nawab Sir Faridoon Daula Bahadur, KCIE, CSI, Assistant Political Minister to His Highness the Nizam's Government
- Montagu de Pomeroy Webb, CIE, Manager, Forbes, Forbes, Campbell and Co., Karachi, Bombay Presidency

====== Commonwealth of Australia ======
- Mary Antill, Organiser, War Chest Fund, Sydney
- Henry Ebenezer Budden, Organiser, Overseas Australian Comforts Funds
- Guillaume Daniel Delprat, for services in connection with steel supplies, etc.
- Mary, Lady Hennessy, Organiser, Victorian Branch, Australian Comforts Fund
- Beatrice Henty, Secretary, Australian Comforts Fund, Melbourne
- Major Frank de Villiers Lamb, for services in connection with the Australian Branch of the British Red Cross Society in England and Egypt
- Clare Lyle
- Hugh Victor McKay, for services in connection with war industries
- Mrs Orme Masson
- Eliza Fraser Mitchell, for services in connection with the Australian Branch of the British Red Cross Society in England and Australia
- Lieutenant-Colonel William James Norman Oldershaw, for services in connection with the Commonwealth Shipping Board
- Frances Mary Woolcott, Honorary Organiser of the Button Fund
- William James Young, for services in connection with Shipping

====== Dominion of New Zealand ======
- Jacobina Luke
- Christina Allan Massey
- Robert Howard Nolan, Honorary Secretary, New Zealand Soldiers' Club
- Theresa Dorothea, Lady Ward
- Oriana Fanny Wilson

====== Egypt and the Sudan ======
- Ernest Macleod Dowson, Director-General of Survey Department
- Cecil Gordon Crawley, in charge of the Government Arsenals
- Wasey Sterry, Chief Justice in the Sudan
- George Eustace Burnett-Stuart, Director of Personnel in Ministry of Interior

====== Newfoundland ======
- The Hon. James Augustus Clift, KC, Acting Minister of Agriculture and Mines, Vice-Chairman of the Standing Committee of the Patriotic Association, Member of the Recruiting Committee and the Pensions Board

====== Union of South Africa ======
- Hester Marion Carter, of the Red Cross and Comforts Committee, Cape Town
- Ernest Chappell, Chairman of the Johannesburg Branch of the Comforts Committee
- Douglas Christopherson, Vice-Chairman, Johannesburg Local Committee, Governor-General's Fund, and Chairman of the Disabled Soldiers Board, Johannesburg
- The Hon. Eleanor Birch Wilson-Fox, Chairman, South African Comforts Committee in London
- Jessie Dodd, Lady Rose-Innes
- Thomas Slingsby Nightingale, CMG, Secretary to the High Commissioner in London for the Union of South Africa
- Evelyn Ashley Wallers, President of the Transvaal Chamber of Mines

====== Crown Colonies, Protectorates, etc ======
- Andrew Agnew, Chairman of River Craft Committee, Member of Food Control and Shipping Committee, and Commandant of the Civil Guard, Straits Settlements
- Thomas Alexander Vans Best, CMG, Administering the Government of the Leeward Islands
- Ethel Dorothy Bowring, for services to the East African Expeditionary Force
- Francis George Bury, Honorary Treasurer, King George and Queen Mary's Club for the Oversea Forces
- Thomas Fraser Burrowes, Comptroller of Customs and Receiver of Enemy Estates, Nigeria
- William Morris Carter, Chief Justice of His Majesty's High Court of Uganda, and Chairman of the Uganda Supplies Board
- Elizabeth Lydia Rosabelle, Lady Clifford, for charitable services in the Gold Coast Colony
- Henry Lawson De Mel, for services to the Government of Ceylon
- Sir Frederick Evans, KCMG, KCVO, for services to the Government of Gibraltar
- Henry Cowper Gollan, KC, Attorney-General and Chairman of the Food Committee of the Colony of Trinidad and Tobago
- Richard Allmond Jeffrey Goode, Secretary to the Administration, Northern Rhodesia
- Francis Charles Jenkin, Deputy Superintendent, Special Police Reserve, Hong Kong
- Reginald Fleming Johnston, District Officer and Magistrate, Weihaiwei
- Joseph Horsford Kemp, Attorney-General of the Colony of Hong Kong
- Albert Ernest Kitson, Director, Geological Survey Department, Gold Coast Colony
- Henry Marks, Member of the Executive and Legislative Councils of the Colony of Fiji; for services to various patriotic funds
- Mary Ethel, Baroness Methuen, for services to the sick and wounded in Malta
- Alice, Lady Miles, President of the Red Cross and other funds, Gibraltar
- Nana Ofori Atta, Paramount Chief of Akin Abuakwa; for services to the Government of the Gold Coast Colony
- Alexander Ransford Slater, CMG, Colonial Secretary of the Gold Coast Colony, for special services in connection with recruiting
- Hippolyte Louis Wiehe du Coudray Souchon, Representative in London of the Mauritius' Chamber of Agriculture

====== Honorary Cmdrs of the said Most Excellent Order ======
- Abubakar Garbai, Shehu of Borno, for services in connection with the Cameroon Campaign
- Sheikh Ali bin Salim, Assistant Liwali, Mombasa
- Mohamadu Abba, Emir of Yola, for services in connection with the Cameroon Campaign

=== Royal Red Cross ===
==== First Class (RRC) ====
- Millicent Acton, Matron (Acting Principal Matron), Territorial Force Nursing Service (T.F.N.S.)
- Margaret Anderson, Head Sister, Australian Army Nursing Service (A.A.N.S)
- Edith Elizabeth Appleton, Acting Sister, Civil Hospital Reserve, St. Bartholomew's
- Ellen Elizabeth Baldrey, Sister, Queen Alexandra's Imperial Military Nursing Service Reserve (Q.A.I.M.N.S.R.)
- Marian Winfield Bannister, Sister, Q.A.I.M.N.S.R.
- Frederickke Wilhelmina Christopherson, Assistant Matron, Q.A.I.M.N.S.R.
- Mary Constance Clark, Superintending Sister, Queen Alexandra's Royal Naval Nursing Service (Q.A.R.N.N.S.)
- Grace Corder, Sister, (Acting Matron), Q.A.I.M.N.S.R.
- Helen Cousins, Matron, 10, Palace Green, W. London
- Elizabeth Joan Cumming, Matron, Army Nursing Service Reserve (A.N.S.R.)
- Nora Dalrymple, Sister, Q.A.I.M.N.S.R.
- Ethel Sarah Davidson, Matron, A.A.N.S.
- Annie Blackley Denton, Acting Matron, Q.A.I.M.N.S.R.
- Helen Dey, Acting Sister, Queen Alexandra's Imperial Military Nursing Service (Q.A.I.M.N.S.)
- Clarice Molyneux Dickson, Sister, A.A.N.S
- Maud Alice Dunn, Sister, T.F.N.S.
- Nora Easby, Acting Sister, Civil Hospital Reserve, St. Thomas Hospital
- Lily Agnes Ephgrave, Staff Nurse (Acting Matron), Q.A.I.M.N.S. (retired)
- Gertrude Annie Flood, Matron, Military Orthopaedic Hospital, Shepherd's Bush
- Mary Gladys Connie Foley, Sister, Q.A.I.M.N.S.
- Dorothy Penrose Foster, Sister, T.F.N.S.
- Myra Goodeve, Matron, Canadian Army Medical Corps (C.A.M.C.)
- Frances Mary Hall, Acting Matron, Q.A.I.M.N.S. (retired)
- Jane Anne Hannah, Sister (Acting Matron), T.F.N.S.
- Elsie Emma Harlow, Sister (Acting Matron), Q.A.I.M.N.S.R.
- Ethel Harwood, Sister (Acting Matron), Q.A.I.M.N.S.R.
- Katie Payne Hodge, Sister, Q.A.I.M.N.S.R., Australia
- Minnie Holmes, Sister (Acting Matron), T.F.N.S.
- Ethel Julia Marion Keene (Acting Matron), Q.A.I.M.N.S.
- Estelle Venner Keogh, Staff Nurse, Q.A.I.M.N.S.R., Australia
- Mary Walker Langlands, Sister, T.F.N.S.
- Dorothy Ann Laughton, Sister, T.F.N.S.
- Gertrude Lulham, Sister, T.F.N.S.
- Margaret Joan Leonara Lyons, Acting Sister, Q.A.I.M.N.S.R.
- Elizabeth Lusk Macaulay, Acting Sister, Civil Hospital Reserve, Edinburgh Mental Hospital
- Cordelia MacKay, Acting Matron, Q.A.I.M.N.S.
- Janet McGregor McDonald, Nursing Sister, C.A.M.C.
- Katherine Violet Sarle Merriman, Sister, T.F.N.S.
- Isabel Muirhead Muir, Sister, T.F.N.S.
- Gertrude Napper, Staff Nurse, Q.A.I.M.N.S.R.
- Alice Nye, Matron, Nursing Service
- Mildred Alice Oakley, Sister, Acting Matron, T.F.N.S.
- Ida O'Dwyer, Head Sister, A.A.N.S
- Elizabeth Orr, Assistant Matron, Q.A.I.M.N.S.R.
- Rachel Patterson, Matron, Nyasaland Nursing Service
- Kathleen Agnes Prendergast, Acting Matron, Q.A.I.M.N.S.R.
- Minnie Farquharson Proctor, Sister, A.A.N.S.
- Elizabeth Rogers, Acting Sister, Q.A.I.M.N.S.R.
- Violet Rogers, Sister, T.F.N.S.
- Alice Rowe, Sister, Q.A.I.M.N.S.
- Amelia Julia, Lady Sargant, ARRC, Commandant and Matron, St. Anselm's Hospital, Walmer
- Eva Owen Schofield, Acting Sister, Civil Hospital Reserve, Edinburgh Royal Infirmary
- Helen Donaldson Shearer, Nursing Sister, C.A.M.C.
- Margaret Helen Smyth, Sister, Q.A.I.M.N.S.
- Alice Violet Stewart, Senior Nursing Sister, Nursing Service
- Louisa Stobo, Head Sister, A.A.N.S.
- Marky Minto Tait, Acting Sister, Civil Hospital Reserve, Glasgow Western Infirmary
- Jean Urquhart, Matron, C.A.M.C.
- Margaret Whitson, Matron, British Red Cross Society
- Maude Willes, ARRC, Sister, (Acting Matron), Q.A.I.M.N.S.
- Eva Florence Wilson, Staff Nurse, Q.A.I.M.N.S.R.
- Nella Myrtle Wilson, Assistant Matron, C.A.M.C.
- Adelaide Anne Wood, Sister, Q.A.I.M.N.S.R.

==== Second Class (Associate RRC) ====
- Maud Alice Abraham, Acting Sister, Civil Hospital Reserve, Middlesex Hospital
- Louisa Joyce Acton, Town Hall Hospital, Torquay
- Helen Addison, Sister, Q.A.I.M.N.S.R.
- Betty Angel, Acting Sister, Civil Hospital Reserve, Royal Free Hospital
- Esther Lydia Ashby, Sister, T.F.N.S.
- Ellen Atkinson, Staff Nurse, Q.A.I.M.N.S.R.
- Alfreeda Jean Attrill, Nursing Sister, Canadian Nursing Service (C.A.N.S.)
- Frances Ethel Bach, Acting Sister, Civil Hospital Reserve, David Lewis Hospital, Liverpool
- Annie Baillie, Nursing Sister, C.A.M.C.
- Geraldine Catherine Ball, Acting Sister, Q.A.I.M.N.S.R.
- Annie Barns, Acting Sister, Civil Hospital Reserve, London Hospital
- Florence Marion Bartleet, Acting Matron, Q.A.I.M.N.S.R.
- Francis Ethel Barwell, Acting Sister, Q.A.I.M.N.S.R.
- Henrietta Bauman, Sister, South African Medical Nursing Service (S.A.M.N.S.)
- Susan Baxter, Acting Sister, Civil Hospital Reserve, Mile End Infirmary
- Mary du Caurroy, The Duchess of Bedford, Woburn Auxiliary Hospital, Bedford
- Beatrice Emily Beeson, Special Probationers Nursing Service
- Louisa Bennett, Sister, British Red Cross Society (B.R.C.S.)
- Marianne Ballingall Bennett, Assistant Matron, Q.A.I.M.N.S.R.
- Mother Mary Berckmans, Matron, Military Hospital, Waterloo Park, Lancashire
- Louisa Harriett Berry, Staff Nurse, T.F.N.S.
- Elizabeth May Best, Nursing Sister, C.A.M.C., Nursing Service
- Florence Ethel Bickmore, Sister, B.R.C.S.
- Frances May Billington, Acting Sister, Q.A.I.M.N.S.R., New Zealand
- Annie Blackburn, Staff Nurse, T.F.N.S.
- Ada Blackman, London Hospital
- Emily Coleclough Blake, Nursing Sister, S.A.M.N.S.
- Elsie Blest, Voluntary Aid Detachment (V.A.D.)
- Constance Boschoff, Staff Nurse, Clandon Park, Guildford
- Emily Caroline Clifford Bramwell, Matron, The Red House Auxiliary Hospital, Leatherhead
- Margaret Allen Brander, Sister, T.F.N.S.
- May Gertrude Broadbent, V.A.D.
- Katharine Alice Broade, Sister, Q.A.I.M.N.S. (retired)
- Flora McDonald Browning, Acting Sister, Civil Hospital Reserve, Royal Infirmary, Sunderland
- Mabel Emma Bruce, Nursing Sister, C.A.M.C., Nursing Service
- Amy Ada Bryant, Matron, Benfleet Hall Auxiliary Hospital, Sutton
- Mathilde Bull, Sister, T.F.N.S.
- Marguerite Eveline Bunyard, V.A.D.
- Ellen Josephine Burke, Staff Nurse, Civil Hospital Reserve, Royal Victoria Hospital, Belfast
- Georgina Burke-Roche, Sister, Nursing Service
- Helen Caig, Acting Sister, Civil Hospital Reserve, Queens Hospital, Birmingham
- Nina Cairns, Sister, Q.A.I.M.N.S.R.
- Alexine Cameron, Sister, T.F.N.S.
- Edith Clare Cameron, Sister, Australian Army Nursing Service (A.A.N.S.)
- Helen Margaret Cameron, Sister, Q.A.I.M.N.S.R.
- Eve Mary Campbell, Honorary Nursing Sister, East Africa Nursing Service (E.A.N.S.)
- Mary Roslyn Carr, Matron, B.R.C.S.
- Edith Emma Dorothy Carter, Acting Sister, Q.A.I.M.N.S.R.
- Stella Caulfield, V.A.D.
- Kathleen Cawler, Staff Nurse, Q.A.I.M.N.S.R.
- Sarah E. Chadwick, Sister, St. Johns Hospital, Southport
- Lily Langshaw Chapman, Sister, T.F.N.S.
- Julie Mary Clancy, Staff Nurse, Civil Hospital Reserve, London Hospital
- Marguerite Gérard Clément, Sister (late A.N.S.), Military Hospital, Newcastle upon Tyne
- Mary Fynes Clinton, V.A.D.
- Lynda Mary Coates, Acting Sister, Civil Hospital Reserve, Royal Devon and Exeter Hospital
- Jessie Alexander Connal, Sister, T.F.N.S.
- Isabel Connor, Nursing Sister, C.A.M.C., Nursing Service
- Ianthe Constantinides, V.A.D.
- Edith Marie Cooper, Acting Sister. Q.A.I.M.N.S.R.
- Amy Isabel Coward, Sister, T.F.N.S.
- Margaret Rosetta Cox, Sister, T.F.N.S.
- Isobella Craig, Acting Sister, Civil Hospital Reserve, Glasgow Royal Infirmary
- Mary Craig, Staff Nurse, S.A.M.N.S.
- Helen Patterson Crawford, Sister, T.F.N.S.
- Mary Matthewson Crichton, Acting Sister, Civil Hospital Reserve, Manchester Royal Infirmary
- Annie Crooks, Acting Sister, Civil Hospital Reserve, London Hospital
- Mary Ellen Crow, Sister, Oakenshaw Hospital, Surbiton
- Jean P. Cullen, Nursing Sister, Queen Alexandra's Royal Naval Nursing Service (Q.A.R.N.N.S.R.)
- Ethel Mary Cumberledge, Acting Sister, Civil Hospital Reserve, St. Bartholomew's
- Agnes Elizabeth Cummings, Acting Sister, Q.A.I.M.N.S.R.
- Constance Cundell, V.A.D.
- Mary Curran, Acting Sister, Civil Hospital Reserve, Royal City of Dublin Hospital
- Elsie Frances Curtis, Sister, Q.A.I.M.N.S.R.
- Clare Daglish, V.A.D.
- May Dale, Nursing Sister, E.A.N.S.
- Henrietta Daly, Acting Sister, Civil Hospital Reserve, London Hospital
- Marianne Emaline Dann, Matron, Red Cross Hospital, Hillfield, Reigate
- Christina Anderson Davidson, Staff Nurse, T.F.N.S.
- Mary Anne Davies, Sister, Q.A.I.M.N.S.R.
- Isabel May Day, Acting Sister, Q.A.I.M.N.S.R.
- Alma Margaret Mary Denny, Sister (Acting Matron), Q.A.I.M.N.S.R.
- Christina McI. Dewar, Nursing Sister, Q.A.R.N.N.S.R.
- Gertrude Marion Doherty, Staff Nurse, A.A.N.S.
- Edith Victoria Donaldson, Acting Sister, Q.A.I.M.N.S.R., Australia
- Helen Louise Drinkwater, Sister, T.F.N.S.
- Mary Annie Earp, V.A.D.
- Alice Mary Eastes, Acting Sister, Q.A.I.M.N.S.R.
- Mary Richmond Easton, Matron, Headquarters, London
- Mary Eksteen, Staff Nurse, S.A.M.N.S
- Christabel Mary Ellis, V.A.D.
- Mary Emerson, Sister, Hildens Military Hospital, Haslemere
- Bessie Ernest, V.A.D.
- Eliza Ann Everett, Nurse, Regents Park Hospital, Southampton
- Margaret Fanny Fell, Sister, T.F.N.S.
- Helen Mary Fergusson, Sister, T.F.N.S.
- Charlotte Fitzmayer, Sister, Q.A.I.M.N.S. (T)
- Jeanie Fitzpatrick (Nursing Services), Dublin.
- Nora Fitzpatrick, Nurse (Nursing Services), Dublin
- May Armstrong Fletcher, Staff Nurse, Q.A.I.M.N.S.R.
- Jean Forbes, Staff Nurse, Q.A.I.M.N.S.R.
- Angela Ford, Sister, Nursing Services
- Ella Foskett, Sister, T.F.N.S.
- Helen Leila Fox, Acting Sister, Q.A.I.M.N.S.R.
- Winifred Heath Fray, Nursing Sister, C.A.M.C.
- Jessica Lillington Freshfield, Sister, B.R.C.S.
- Kleo Friend, Commandant, The Castle Auxiliary Hospital, Ryde, Isle of Wight
- Mary Furdham, Staff Nurse, Q.A.I.M.N.S.R.
- Jean Fyfe, Asst Matron, Q.A.I.M.N.S.R.
- Margaret Mary Galbraith, Asst Matron, C.A.M.C., Nursing Service
- Margaret Gall, Sister, T.F.N.S.
- Elsie Vera Orby Gascoigne, Acting Sister, Civil Hospital Reserve, St. Bartholomew's Hospital
- Mabel Emily Gascome, Acting Sister, Civil Hospital Reserve, West Hertfordshire Hospital
- Elsie Georgina Gawith, V.A.D.
- Kathleen Gawler, Staff Nurse, Q.A.I.M.N.S.R.
- Janet Elizabeth Giles, Matron, B.R.C.S.
- Charlotte Mary Gooding, Sister, Kingston, Surbiton and District Red Cross Hospital, New Maiden
- Katherine Marsh Gordon, V.A.D. Member
- Edith Mary Goss, Lady Superintendent, Palace Auxiliary Hospital, Gloucester
- Jemima Helen Grant, Acting Sister, Q.A.I.M.N.S.R.
- Dora Granville Grayson, Acting Sister, Q.A.I.M.N.S.R.
- Dorothy Greig, Special Probationers Nursing Service
- Edith Hadfield, Acting Sister, Civil Hospital Reserve, Hull Royal Infirmary
- Mary Beatrice Hall, Staff Nurse, Q.A.I.M.N.S.R.
- Jessie Jean Halliday, Staff Nurse, T.F.N.S.
- Florence Harley, Sister, Q.A.I.M.N.S.R.
- Eliza Agnes Harrison, Assistant Matron, T.F.N.S.
- Sybil M. Harry, Sister, Headquarters, London
- Lizzie Haxell, Acting Sister, Q.A.I.M.N.S.R.
- Sarah Heaney, Nursing Sister, C.A.M.C.
- Dorothy Henderson, Nursing Sister, Q.A.R.N.N.S.
- Frances Henderson, V.A.D.
- Helen Catherine Henry, Special Probationer Nursing Service
- Georgina Hester, Acting Sister, Civil Hospital Reserve, University College Hospital
- Ruth Hewlett, V.A.D.
- Elizabeth Bridges Hill, Acting Sister, Q.A.I.M.N.S.R.
- Norah Hill, V.A.D.
- Margaret Agnes Hilliard, Acting Sister, Civil Hospital Reserve, Guy's Hospital
- Gertrude Hind, Sister, T.F.N.S.
- Ethel Madeline Gertrude Hirst, Nursing Sister, Q.A.R.N.N.S.
- Jennie Holford, Sister, T.F.N.S.
- Olive Kathleen Holmes, Nursing Sister, B.R.C.S.
- Edith Hounslow, V.A.D.
- Amy Howard, Nursing Sister, Canadian Army Nursing Service (C.A.N.S), Canadian General Hospital, Orpington
- Ruth Howlett, V.A.D.
- Edith Hudson, Nursing Member, C.A.N.S.
- Ethel Hutchings, Sister, Nursing Service
- Florance Hyndman, Acting Sister, Civil Hospital Reserve, Sir Patrick Dun's Hospital, Dublin
- Georgina Swinton Jacob, Sister, Q.A.I.M.N.S.
- Sybil Ada Catherine Jarvis, Acting Sister, Civil Hospital Reserve, St. Bartholomew's Hospital
- Lilian Maud Jeans, Acting Sister, Civil Hospital Reserve, Charing Cross Hospital
- Dorothy Jobson, V.A.D.
- Isobella Kate Jobson, Staff Nurse, Q.A.I.M.N.S.R., Australia
- Nora Johnson, V.A.D.
- Sarah Persis Johnson, Nursing Sister, C.A.M.C. Nursing Service
- Kate Elizabeth Jones, Matron, Kingston, Surbiton District Red Cross Hospital, New Maiden
- Mary Ann Jones, V.A.D.
- Nellie Ida Jordan, Sister, Q.A.I.M.N.S.
- Mabel Kaberry, Acting Matron, Q.A.I.M.N.S.
- Alicia Mary Kelly, Sister, A.A.N.S.
- Evelyn Stewart Killery, Sister, Q.A.I.M.N.S.
- Charlotte Grace Kirkpatrick, Sister, T.F.N.S.
- Annie Knox, Sister, T.F.N.S.
- Jean Knox, Sister, Q.A.I.M.N.S.R.
- Helen Lamb, Staff Nurse, T.F.N.S.
- Anne Ardagh Langley, Acting Sister, Q.A.I.M.N.S.R.
- Harriet Lassell, Matron of Kasr-el-Aine Hospital
- The Hon. Margaret Cecilia Lawley, V.A.D.
- The Hon. Ursula Mary Lawley, V.A.D.
- Lorna Priscilla Leatham, V.A.D.
- Annie Norrish Lee, Staff Nurse, Q.A.I.M.N.S.R.
- Mary Anderson Linton, Staff Nurse, Civil Hospital Reserve, London Hospital
- Constance Little, V.A.D.
- Janet McFarlane Livingston, Acting Sister, Q.A.I.M.N.S.R.
- Mary Frances Looney, Staff Nurse, New Zealand Army Medical Corps (N.Z.A.M.C) Nursing Service
- Daisy Lynch, Acting Sister, Civil Hospital Reserve, Leicester Royal County Hospital
- Edith Macarthy, V.A.D.
- Ella Marie Louise MacFadden, Sister, Q.A.I.M.N.S.R.
- Nellie Mackenzie, Sister, Q.A.I.M.N.S.R.
- Annie Forguil Macleod, Staff Nurse, Q.A.I.M.N.S.R.
- Jean Mair, Acting Sister, Q.A.I.M.N.S.R.
- Letitia Mary Manley, Acting Sister, Civil Hospital Reserve, Middlesex Hospital
- Louise Grace Mannell, Staff Nurse, Q.A.I.M.N.S.R.
- Marion S. Marshall, Nursing Sister, Q.A.R.N.N.S.R.
- Bertha Martin, Staff Nurse, Q.A.I.M.N.S.R.
- Elizabeth Martin, Nursing Sister, C.A.M.C.
- Mary Barbara Martin, Sister, Q.A.I.M.N.S.R.
- Esther Chisholme Masterton, Staff Nurse, Civil Hospital Reserve, Glasgow Royal Infirmary
- Beatrice Matthews, Staff Nurse, T.F.N.S.
- Margaret Ballantyre McBride, Sister, T.F.N.S.
- Madeline McCarthy, V.A.D.
- Marion McCormick, Sister, Q.A.I.M.N.S.
- Margaret McCort, Nursing Sister, C.A.M.C.
- Mary Scott McDonald, Staff Nurse, Q.A.I.M.N.S.R.
- Susannah Josephine McGann, Staff Nurse, New Zealand Army Nursing Service (N.Z.A.N.S.)
- Jessie McGillivray, Sister, Q.A.I.M.N.S.R.
- Mary S. McHugh, Acting Sister, Q.A.I.M.N.S.R.
- Caroline Amelia McIlrath, Staff Nurse, Q.A.I.M.N.S.R.
- Florence McKellar, Staff Nurse, T.F.N.S.
- Joan Davina Carstairs McPherson, Sister, Q.A.I.M.N.S.
- Margaret Meikle, Matron, Cadland Auxiliary Hospital, New Forest, Hampshire
- Ebba Wendell de Merrall, Nursing Sister, C.A.N.S., Canadian General Hospital, Taplow
- Mary Merrill, V.A.D.
- Agnes Midgley, Matron, B.R.C.S.
- Janet Mitchell, Staff Nurse, T.F.N.S.
- Kate Mildred Moore, Matron, Headquarters, London
- Grace Morgan, Matron, Arrowe Hall Hospital, Woodchurch, near Birkenhead
- Gertrude Daisy Morris, Acting Matron, Q.A.I.M.N.S. (retired)
- Martha Reid Morrison, Sister, T.F.N.S.
- Helena Morrough, Sister, T.F.N.S.
- Elizabeth Mosey, Sister, A.A.N.S.
- Ellen Murray, Acting Sister, Q.A.I.M.N.S.R.
- Anne Elizabeth Musson, Sister, T.F.N.S.
- Amy Augusta Neville, V.A.D.
- Dorothy Jane Louisa Newton, Sister, A.A.N.S.
- Elizabeth Scott Newton, Acting Sister, Civil Hospital Reserve, Leith General Hospital
- Eliza Jane Nicol, Sister, T.F.N.S.
- Helena Nisbett, V.A.D.
- Millicent Mary Nix, Nurse, The Princess Christian Hospital, Weymouth
- Adeline Annie Pallot, Nursing Sister, Nyasaland Nursing Service
- Janet Parry, Sister, T.F.N.S.
- Violetta Chancha Paschali, Sister, Q.A.I.M.N.S. (retired)
- Marian Paterson, Acting Sister, Civil Hospital Reserve, St. Bartholomew's
- Margaret Brand Paterson, Nursing Sister, Q.A.R.N.N.S.
- Mary Paul, Sister, T.F.N.S.
- Edith Payne, V.A.D.
- Margaret Ion Pierson, Special Probationers Nursing Service
- Geraldine Platt, V.A.D.
- Sophie Eleanor Pollard, Lady Superintendent, Auxiliary Military Hospital, Thirsk
- Mary Pool, Sister, T.F.N.S.
- Edith Mary Porter, Assistant Matron, T.F.N.S.
- Mary Potts, Acting Matron, Q.A.I.M.N.S.R.
- Florence Catharine Puddicombe, Acting Sister, Q.A.I.M.N.S.R.
- Elsie Evelyn Quilter, Acting Sister, Civil Hospital Reserve, Guy's Hospital
- Annie Mary Raine, Sister, T.F.N.S.
- Katharine Rapson, Matron, St. George's Hill Auxiliary Hospital, Surrey
- Ethel Reade, Sister, S.A.M.N.S.
- Anne Victoria Reay, Acting Sister, Q.A.I.M.N.S.R., Australia
- Helena Kate Repton, Matron, B.R.C.S.
- Maud Reynolds-Knight, Acting Sister, Civil Hospital Reserve, Westminster Hospital
- Kate Ianthe Richardson, Acting Sister, Civil Hospital Reserve, Guy's Hospital
- Sarah Jane Robley, Nursing Sister, C.A.M.C., Nursing Service
- Amy Frances Rohde, V.A.D.
- Mary Francis Ronaldson, Acting Sister, Civil Hospital Reserve, Nottingham General Hospital
- Mary Ellen Ruck, Sister, T.F.N.S.
- Margaret Rudland, Sister, B.R.C.S.
- Dorothea Rudman, Acting Sister, Civil Hospital Reserve, Manchester Royal Infirmary
- Alice Mary Sampson, Acting Matron, T.F.N.S.
- Mabel Scholes, V.A.D.
- Elizabeth Sear, Staff Nurse, Q.A.I.M.N.S.R.
- Ethel L. Shute (Sister Ignatius), Matron, St. Andrew's Hospital, Dollis Hill, London
- Lilian Sidebotham, Sister, T.F.N.S.
- Mary Simon, Matron, Wykeham Abbey Auxiliary Military Hospital, York
- Mary Skinner, V.A.D.
- Dorothy Carmynow Sloggett, V.A.D.
- Ann Smith, Sister, T.F.N.S.
- Dora Shanklie Smith, Sister, Q.A.I.M.N.S.R.
- Elizabeth Smith, Sister, Camberley Auxiliary Military Hospital
- Ethel Smith, Sister, Q.A.I.M.N.S.R.
- Mabel Basden Smith, Nursing Sister, Q.A.R.N.N.S.
- Ethel Margaret Spicer, Acting Sister, Civil Hospital Reserve, London Hospital
- Hilda Frances Starbuck, Acting Sister, Q.A.I.M.N.S.R.
- Ethel Fowler Stephenson, Sister, Q.A.I.M.N.S.
- Ellenor Stevenson, Matron, Auxiliary Hospital, Henley-in-Arden, Warwick
- Mary Ramsay Stewart-Richardson, Acting Sister, Q.A.I.M.N.S.R.
- Annie Maud Stirling, Nursing Sister, C.A.M.C.
- Emma Jane Stokes, Sister, T.F.N.S.
- Isabella Lyle Storar, Sister, T.F.N.S.
- Aileen Yvonne Swann, V.A.D.
- Dorothy Maud Sweet, V.A.D.
- Matilda Goodall Tate, Staff Nurse, Q.A.I.M.N.S.R.
- Lavinia Taylor, Sister, T.F.N.S.
- Sophie Isabel Thomson, Sister, T.F.N.S.
- Jean Todd, Sister, Q.A.I.M.N.S.
- Constance Robina Townend, Assistant Matron, Q.A.I.M.N.S.
- Lucy Mary Trumble, Staff Nurse, N.Z.A.N.S.
- Sadie Tyler, Acting Sister, Q.A.I.M.N.S.
- Ethel Frances Upton, Nursing Sister, C.A.M.C.
- Mabel Vivian, Matron, The Princess Christian Hospital, Weymouth
- Ellen Constance Wadling, Acting Sister, Civil Hospital Reserve, St. Thomas's Hospital
- Agnes Walker, Sister, T.F.N.S.
- Ann Wilson Wallace, Nursing Sister, S.A.N.S.
- Dorothy Ward, Sister, T.F.N.S.
- Phyllis Mary Waterland, Assistant Matron, B.R.C.S.
- Amy Waterman, Acting Sister, Civil Hospital Reserve, Middlesex Hospital
- Ethel Frances Watkins, Acting Sister, Q.A.I.M.N.S.R.
- Agnes Colthart Watson, Sister, T.F.N.S.
- Helena Hendrina Weise, Sister, S.A.M.N.S.
- Jean Wells, Acting Sister, Q.A.I.M.N.S.R.
- Gertrude Whitehurst, V.A.D.
- Cicely Wicksteed, V.A.D.
- Clarice Malvenie Williams, Sister, Q.A.I.M.N.S.
- Edith Mary Williams, Matron, Red Cross Hospital, Brecon, South Wales
- Margaret Williams, Sister, T.F.N.S.
- Ida Grace Willis, Assistant Matron, N.Z.A.N.S.
- Annie Paterson Wilson, Acting Sister, Q.A.I.M.N.S.
- Isabella Wilson, Sister, Q.A.I.M.N.S.R.
- Eleanor Miriam Woodhouse, Sister, T.F.N.S.
- Mary Gertrude Woodrow, Matron, Caenshill Auxiliary Hospital, Weybridge
- Elizabeth Ann Woodward, Sister, Q.A.I.M.N.S. (T)
- Violet Isobel Wotton, V.A.D.
- Elizabeth Young-Scott, V.A.D.

==== Awarded a Bar to the Royal Red Cross (RRC*) ====
- Ethel Hope Becher, RRC, Matron-in-Chief, Q.A.I.M.N.S.
- Sidney Jane Brown, RRC, Matron-in-Chief, T.F.N.S. (Retired, Q.A.I.M.N.S.)
- Jane Hoadley, RRC, Matron, Q.A.I.M.N.S.
- Beatrice Isabel Jones, RRC, Matron, Q.A.I.M.N.S.
- Emma Maud McCarthy, RRC, Matron-in-Chief, Q.A.I.M.N.S.
- Sarah Elizabeth Oram, RRC, Principal Matron (Temporary Matron-in-Chief), Q.A.I.M.N.S.
- Anne Beadsmore Smith, RRC, Principal Matron, Q.A.I.M.N.S.
- Mary Wilson RRC Principal Matron, Q.A.I.M.N.S.

=== Medal of the Order of the British Empire ===
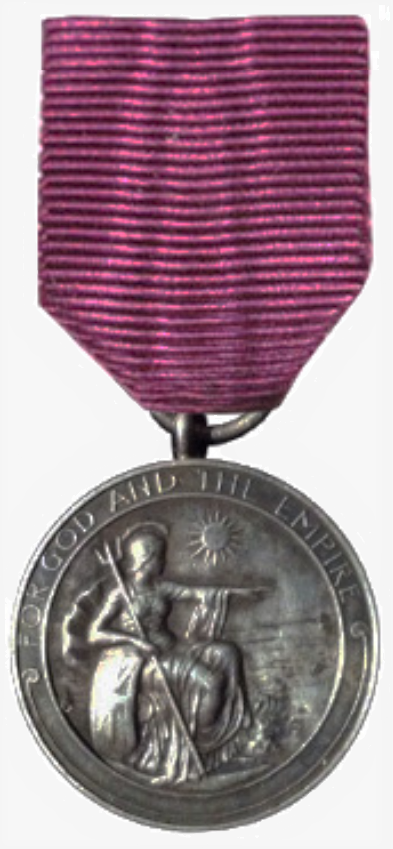
Medal of the Order of the British Empire

For services in connection with the War in which great courage or self-sacrifice has been displayed.

- Robert Adair. For courage in continuing to work his engine while molten metal was falling round him.
- Mary Adams. For courage in assisting others, at great personal risk, in a fire.
- Charles Alford. For courage in removing a large quantity of high explosives during a fire.
- Arthur Ernest Allen. For courage in rescuing a fellow-worker at great personal risk.
- Arthur Joseph Allen. For courage and resource in assisting to extinguish a fire at an explosives factory at great personal risk.
- James Andrew. For courage in remaining at his work during a fire which resulted in a very serious explosion.
- John Andrewartha, Fitter, Devonport Dockyard. For courage on the occasion of the trials of a submarine.
- Edwin Bolwell Andrews. For courage in extinguishing a fire in chemical works under circumstances of grave personal danger.
- John Edward Andrews. For courage in keeping up steam immediately after an explosion when another explosion seemed imminent.
- Charles Armes, Cable Foreman, General Post Office. Employed on cable ships and small craft in connection with war work in dangerous waters.
- F. W. Assirati, Postman. Devotion to duty under specially difficult and dangerous circumstances.
- Jesse Attrill, Boatswain. For coolness and resource in averting a serious accident to one of H.M. Ships.
- Ethel Alice Auger. For courage and high example in remaining at her post on a tram, and thus preventing severe casualties to fellow-workers. In doing so she was severely injured.
- Sidney Aylward. For courage and resource in subduing a fire at imminent personal risk.
- George Badger. For courage and self-sacrifice in attempting to save life, in spite of severe personal injuries.
- George William Badsey. For courage in fighting, at very great personal risk, a fire caused by an explosion.
- John Baillie, Chargeman of Engine Fitter, Northern Base. For courage and perseverance in carrying out work involving much exposure and risk.
- George Baird. For courage in saving a child from drowning at the works and returning at once to his work.
- Daniel Ball. For courage in having several times effected temporary repairs to important plant in an explosives factory at considerable risk to his life.
- George Charles Bannister, For great courage in clearing a man-hole at great personal risk.
- John Thomas Barber, Carpenter, General Post Office. Employed on cable ships and small craft in connection with war work in dangerous waters.
- Henry Barnard. For courage in fighting a fire at great personal risk while many bags of explosives were being removed.
- Thomas Henry Bashford. For great courage on two occasions, entering a tank to recover a fellow-workman who was gassed, and entering a tar still heater.
- Robert Baxter. For courage and resource in saving the life of a fellow-worker at great personal risk.
- Beatrice Oxley Beaufort. For courage and high example in continuing to do very dangerous experimental work in spite of injuries received in consequence.
- Fanny Elizabeth Beaumont, Sorting Clerk and Telegraphist. Displayed great courage and devotion to duty during air-raids.
- John Finnis Beer, Cable Hand. Employed on cable ships and small craft in connection with war work in dangerous waters.
- Thomas Bond Bellis. For courage and resource in assisting, at great personal risk, to extinguish a fire at an explosives factory.
- Samuel Hall Bennett. For courage in returning to work within an hour of breaking his thumb whilst at work at age 69.
- Myra Grace Bessent, Telephonist. Displayed great courage and devotion to duty during air-raids.
- Sydney Rome Black, Assistant Draughtsman. For courage on the occasion of the trials of a submarine.
- James Elias Bloomfield. For courage in extricating living and dead from ruined buildings under circumstances of great danger.
- Emmanuel Bloxam. For great courage displayed on the occasion of a serious explosion, when he assisted in extinguishing a fire and saved the life of a fellow-worker at very great personal danger.
- Robert Leach Boal. For courage in keeping down a fire in an explosives factory.
- Edward Bond. For courage in closing a main valve on a steam boiler at great personal risk of scalding and suffocation.
- Francis Booker, Leading Man, Works Dept., Portsmouth Dockyard, For perseverance in carrying out certain difficult works in the face of grave risks due to bad weather.
- John Booth. For courage in extinguishing a fire on two occasions at very great personal risk.
- Lilian Ada Bostock, Telephonist. Displayed great courage and devotion to duty during air-raids.
- Arthur Bradbury. For courage in dealing with fires in an explosives factory and remaining at work in a poisonous atmosphere in order to ensure the safety of plant.
- George Arthur Bradbury. For courage in assisting to extinguish a fire in an explosives factory at great personal risk.
- Martha Bramhall. For courage in remaining continuously afc a very dangerous task in spite of the occurrence of several explosions.
- J. H. Brelsford. For courage in assisting, though severely injured, to rescue fellow-workers and to extinguish a fire which resulted in a very serious explosion.
- Amelia Brisley. For courage and high example in cases of explosion in a factory.
- Emily Brooke. For great courage shown at an outbreak of fire in an explosives factory.
- Andrew Brown. For conspicuous courage in stopping a fire and giving the alarm, under circumstances of the gravest personal danger, after he had been injured by the explosion and rendered unconscious.
- Edwin Brown. For courage in extinguishing a fire after an explosion in which he lost the sight of an eye, and enabling 600 of his fellow-workers to get clear.
- Ethel Brown. For courage on the occasion of a fire in an explosives factory.
- Harry Brown. For courage in working continuously under circumstances of very great danger.
- Mary Brown. For courage and high example in getting work started again under circumstances of considerable danger.
- William Bryant. For courage in preventing further serious explosion in a filling factory, at very great personal risk.
- John Buckley. For courage and self-sacrifice in carrying out dangerous experiments.
- Margaret Winifred Burdett-Coutts. For courage in that, after losing a finger and badly lacerating her hand in a circular saw, she went away quietly to have it treated, in order not to unnerve her fellow workers.
- Marion Burrell, Sorting Clerk and Telegraphist. Displayed great courage and devotion to duty during air-raids.
- James Burton. For great courage in rescuing workers from burning explosives shops, at great personal risk.
- Louisa Busby. For courage in returning to work after an accident resulting in loss of right hand and other injuries.
- Edith Butler. For courage, resource, and high example. Has saved the lives of at least two workers, and has displayed exceptional skill and courage in several serious accidents.
- Gertrude Elizabeth Butler. For courage and high example in continuing at her work during a fire, under circumstances of great danger.
- George Patrick Campbell, Carpenter, General Post Office. Employed on cable ships and small craft, in connection with war work in dangerous waters.
- Richard Cardo. For courage and resource shown on several occasions under circumstances of great personal danger.
- Louisa Margaret Carlton, Supervisor, Telephones. Displayed great courage and devotion to duty during air-raids and bombardment from the sea.
- Samuel Carter. For courage and resource in saving the life of a chemist and three workers who were overcome by fumes in an explosives factory.
- Florence Marie Cass, Telephonist. Displayed great courage and devotion to duty while in charge of a telephone exchange during a serious explosion at a neighbouring munition works.
- Sydney Chambers. For great courage in rescuing workers from burning explosives shops at great personal risk.
- William Frank Chorley. For courage in removing a large quantity of high explosives during a fire.
- Annie Clarke. For courage in keeping workers together under circumstances of great danger.
- Mabel Eleanor Clarke, Telephonist. Displayed great courage and devotion to duty during air-raids.
- Alexander Clelland. For courage and resource under circumstances of great danger.
- Gertrude Coles. For courage in returning to work after her hand had been mutilated by an explosion.
- John Corder. For courage in fighting a fire caused by an explosion, at very great personal risk.
- Alexander Cornelius. For courage in having, on two occasions, saved a large amount of raw material in an explosives factory at the risk of his life.
- Thomas Cosby, Fitter, Devonport Dockyard. For courage on the occasion of the trials of a new submarine.
- Herbert Luigi Costa. For courage in continuing to work under circumstances of great danger.
- Mabel Rosa Cox, Chargewoman, Royal Naval Cordite Factory. For devotion to duty and great presence of mind in averting an explosion when in charge of a guncotton press.
- May Victoria Croucher. For courage and high example on the occasion of a fire at an explosives factory.
- Thomas Crutchley. For courage in entering a gas main and saving the lives of two workers who were gassed, at very great personal risk.
- Sophia Cunningham. For courage and high example in continuing her duties immediately after a severe explosion.
- John Cuskearn. For courage in making a determined attempt to recover a valuable instrument from the cooling pond, in consequence of which he contracted blood poisoning and nearly died.
- Lucie Jane Dartnell, Sorting Clerk and Telegraphist. Displayed great courage and devotion to duty during air-raids.
- James Davidson, Bricklayer's Labourer. For courage in rescuing a fellow-workman who had been overcome by gas inside a gas apparatus.
- Ben Davies. For courage and high example in remaining at work for an hour after being painfully burnt on his hands, face and neck, and returning to duty for another five hours immediately after treatment.
- James Henry Davies, Skilled Workman, General Post Office. Showed habitual courage in carrying out repairs to submarine cables in difficult and dangerous waters.
- Robert John Davies, Electrical Fitter, Devonport Dockyard. For courage and self-sacrifice on the occasion of an explosion on a submarine boat, on which he was at work.
- Violet Annie Davies. For courage in remaining at her post at the telephone during a severe explosion. Age 15.
- William Dixon. For courage in rescuing a fellow-worker at great personal risk.
- Joseph Doran. For courage and resource in preventing a fire in an explosives factory, under exceptionally dangerous circumstances.
- James Downie, Engine Fitter. For courage and prompt action in helping to extinguish fires which had broken out in the stokeholds of two patrol vessels fitting out.
- John Duff. For courage in preventing a serious explosion under circumstances of great danger.
- James Duffy. For courage in attempting to stop a fire in an explosives factory under exceptionally dangerous circumstances.
- Peter Dunbabin. For courage and self-sacrifice in carrying out dangerous experiments.
- Lucien Duncombe. For courage in removing a large quantity of high explosives during a fire.
- Albun Dunn. For courage in saving the life of a fellow worker after an explosion, and giving the alarm, although himself injured by an explosion.
- Bertha Annie Florence Easter, Telephonist. Displayed great courage and devotion to duty during air-raids.
- Nicholas Edghill. For courage in helping to subdue fire at great personal risk.
- Mabel Ann Edwards. For courage and high example on the occasion of a fire at an explosives factory.
- Nora Egan. For great courage shown at an outbreak of fire in an explosives factory.
- Henry Etheridge, Skilled Workman, General Post Office. Employed on cable ships and small craft in connection with war work in dangerous waters.
- Frank Cyril Evans. For self-sacrifice in continuing to work, though blind in one eye and the other affected, caused by an accident at work, and in spite of constant pain.
- Fred Evans. For courage and self-sacrifice in carrying out dangerous experiments.
- James Evans. For courage and self-sacrifice in carrying out dangerous experiments.
- May Evans. For courage in assisting to stop a fire in an explosives factory at considerable danger to her life.
- Francis Fagan, Special Constable, For rescuing a drowning man from Holyhead Harbour in circumstances of difficulty and danger.
- Alfred William James Fautley. For courage and resource in stopping a fire in highly inflammable material, at the risk of his life and at the cost of severe injuries.
- Rosa Frances Finbow. For courage in returning to work after serious injury to her face through an explosion.
- Jane Fisher. For courage in assisting to stop a fire in an explosives factory at considerable danger to her life.
- Maude Fisher. For great courage shown at an outbreak of fire in an explosives factory.
- Michael Fitzpatrick. For courage in attempting to save part of an explosives factory at great risk of his life.
- Bertha Flintoff, Telephonist. Displayed great courage and devotion to duty during an air-raid.
- James Harold Foster. For courage in helping to extinguish a fire at cost of serious injuries to himself.
- Bernard John Francis. For courage and resource in saving the life of a fellow worker.
- Frank Charles Frazer. For courage in preventing an explosion in a filling factory at great personal risk, though partly blinded and suffering considerable pain from explosion.
- William Gilchrist. For self-sacrifice and high example in persisting in work which is often dangerous, though suffering from an incurable disease and often suffering great pain.
- Margaret Annie Louise Godfrey, Telephonist. Displayed great courage and devotion to duty during an air-raid.
- Robert William Godfrey, Diver, Admiralty Salvage Section. For courage and devotion to duty in Gallipoli, diving on many occasions when the beaches were being shelled.
- William Gommersall. For several acts of great courage and self-sacrifice.
- Edna Goodenough. For continuing to work after suffering serious injuries through an explosion, resulting in loss of right eye.
- James Gosling. For courage in removing a large quantity of high explosives during a fire.
- James Grainger. For courage in having, on two occasions, continued at his work in an explosives factory under circumstances of great danger, thereby stopping further damage.
- Frank Wallis Green. For courage and resource in subduing a fire at imminent personal risk.
- John Green. For courage and self-sacrifice in dealing with acid and poisonous fumes.
- Thomas Edwin Ernest Griffiths. For courage in removing a large quantity of high explosives during a fire.
- Frederick Thomas Grigsby. For courage and high example in continuing at his duty during a series of severe explosions.
- Frederick Edward Hall. For courage in carrying out very dangerous experiments in a highly-poisonous atmosphere.
- James Hamilton. For courage and resource in preventing a fire in an explosives factory under exceptionally dangerous circumstances.
- Alice Hanson. For great courage shown at an outbreak of fire in an explosives factory.
- James Harley, Assistant Foreman Ironworker. For courage in entering a confined space in a vessel, which was full of noxious fumes, and plugging holes in the structure.
- Elsie Lilian Harman, Supervisor, Telephones. Displayed great courage and devotion to duty during air-raids.
- John David Harris
- Doris Hirst, Telephonist. For courage in fighting a fire caused by an explosion, at very great personal risk.
- Mary Hartley. For courage and high example: in remaining at her engine and controlling it after having been badly wounded by breakage, of the governor and returning to her work a week later.
- Thomas Havery, Chancery Servant at the British Embassy, Petrograd. Courageous conduct in the discharge of his duties during the revolutionary disturbances in March 1917.
- E. James Hawkins. For courage in preventing an explosion and fire at great personal risk.
- William Henry Hayden. For great courage at very great personal risk on the occasion of several fires in a filling factory.
- Ethel Head. For courage and high example in rescuing fellow workers after an explosion.
- Alice Ann Healey, Telephonist. Displayed great courage and devotion to duty during air-raids.
- William Heather, Cable Foreman, General Post Office. Employed on cable ships and small craft in connection with war work in dangerous waters.
- William Hemmingsley. For courage and resource in saving the life of a fellow worker.
- Harry Hepworth. For great courage shown at an outbreak of fire in an explosion factory.
- Gladys Elizabeth Herrington. For courage in volunteering to undertake dangerous work after a fatal accident.
- Amos Freke Hesman. For courage in preventing an explosion and fire, at great personal risk.
- William Hewitt. For courage in saving the life of a fellow worker, who was overcome by poisonous fumes, at great personal risk.
- Ethel Nora Elizabeth Hickey, Telephonist. Displayed great courage and devotion to duty during air-raids and on the occasion of a fire.
- Thomas Hickey, Skilled Workman, General Post Office. Has displayed great courage while carrying out telegraph work under dangerous conditions.
- William Charles Hicks, Skilled Workman, General Post Office. Has rendered valuable service since the beginning of the war. Has remained at his post absolutely alone day and night, in spite of danger from submarine or other attacks.
- Alfred Higgs. For courage and resource in saving the lives of two of his fellow workers, at great personal risk.
- Frederick Higham, Special Constable. Swam to an airship which had fallen into a river and assisted two of the crew to reach the bank.
- Edward Hill, Steel Smelter. For courage and endurance on many occasions. Remained at her post until relieved, on the occasion of a very serious explosion at munition works, notwithstanding the fact that the explosions were almost, continuous, and that the police advised the officers on duty to leave the building.
- George William Hobbs, Boatswain, General Post Office. Employed on cable ships in connection with war work in dangerous waters.
- Thomas William Hobbs, Chargeman of Engine Fitters, Devonport Dockyard. For courage on the occasion of the trials of a new submarine.
- Frank Hodgkinson. For courage in assisting to extinguish a fire in an explosives factory, at great personal risk.
- George Hogan. For courage and resource in subduing a fire, at imminent personal risk.
- Victoria Irene Holdsworth. For courage and resource in preventing serious injuries to a fellow worker.
- Annie Holly. For courage in continuing at work, though suffering from severe injuries to eye, caused by an explosion.
- Janet Holmes. For courage and resource on the occasion of an explosion in a filling factory.
- Mrs Holttum. For courage in assisting to save the lives of fellow workers during a fire which resulted in a serious explosion, though sustaining severe injuries herself.
- G. Hulley. For courage in assisting to extinguish a fire, which resulted in a very serious explosion.
- William Hulme. For courage in assisting to extinguish a fire in an explosives factory, at great personal risk.
- Mabel Hunt, Telephonist. Displayed great courage and devotion to duty during an air raid.
- Walter William Hunt. For courage in saving the life of a fellow worker.
- William Hunt. For courage and resource on two occasions in preventing serious fires. Age 66.
- Frederick Innes, For high courage and resource in closing the outlet valve of a collapsed gas-holder, in which the gas was alight.
- Horace Ivin, Skilled Workman, General Post Office. Has done valuable service under dangerous conditions, repairing submarine cables carrying naval and military wires.
- Florence Jackson. For courage displayed during a time of great danger in a filling factory.
- William Jackson. For courage and resource in saving the life of a fellow worker at very great risk to himself.
- Herbert Janes. For courage in returning to work immediately after his hand had been dressed on account of his losing three fingers in a shearing machine.
- Jack Lane Jeffery. For courage connected with production and testing of exceptionally dangerous materials.
- Charles William Johnson. For courage and resource shown on several occasions under circumstances of great personal danger.
- Charles William James Johnson. For courage in carrying out repairs to plant in explosives factory in the presence of dangerous gases.
- Ellen Johnson, Sorting Clerk and Telegraphist. Displayed great courage and devotion to duty during air-raids.
- Alfred Frank Jones, For great courage and high example shown on the occasion of a severe explosion in an explosives factory.
- John Richard Jones. For courage and resource in assisting to extinguish a fire at an explosives factory at great personal risk.
- Maurice Jones, Inspector, Engineering Department, General Post Office. Has carried out two very dangerous missions, successfully passing through hostile lines at great personal risk.
- Robert Jones. For courage and resource in assisting to extinguish a fire at a filling factory, at imminent risk of serious explosion.
- Thomas Jones. For courage and high example in doing hard work for long hours in spite of his age (79 years).
- George Henry Jordan. For courage in fighting a fire caused by an explosion, at very great personal risk.
- John Kane. For courage in saving the lives of several fellow-workers who were buried in the lining of a furnace which they were repairing.
- W. A. Keeling. For courage in remaining at his work during a fire which resulted in a very serious explosion.
- Mary Keenan. For courage and high example on the work after sustaining severe injury to face and eyes, on account of an explosion.
- Mary Kiaer. For courage and high example on the occasion of a fire at a filling factory.
- Herbert John King. For courage in extinguishing a fire in an explosives factory at very great risk to his life.
- Rosa Kate Kipling. For courage in returning to her work after seven and a half months serious illness and several operations caused by an explosion.
- James Kirby, Ship Fitter, Portsmouth Dockyard. For self-sacrifice in helping to extricate an injured fellow-workman from a place of danger, though he himself was dangerously injured.
- Walter Reginald Knight. For courage in assisting to extinguish a fire in an explosives factory and removing explosives from the burning building.
- John Knox. For courage in saving the lives of several fellow-workers who were buried in the lining of a furnace which they were repairing.
- Robert Lake, Fitter and Outside Erector. For courage on board a submarine in dangerous circumstances.
- Patrick Lambe, Skilled Workman, General Post Office. Rendered very valuable service in picking up and repairing wires which had been shot down.
- Charles Henry Lambert, Master Mariner, Examination Service and Rescue Tugs, Dover Dockyard. For courage and skill displayed in towing cargo and other ships out of a minefield after they had been mined.
- Albert Frederick Lane. For courage and high example on the occasion of a fire in an explosives factory.
- Philip C. Langridge, Inspector, Engineering Department, General Post Office. Displayed great courage and devotion to duty during air-raids.
- Michael Lavelle. For courage and self-sacrifice in carrying out dangerous experiments.
- Ada Mary Laws, Telephonist. Displayed great courage and devotion to-duty during air-raids.
- Ethel Mary Leeds, Telephonist. Displayed great courage and devotion to duty during air-raids.
- Mabel Lethbridge. For courage and high example shown on the occasion of an accident in a filling factory, causing loss of one leg and severe injuries to the other.
- John James Lewes, Skilled Labourer, Works Department, Portsmouth Dockyard, For great skill and daring in the performance of difficult and dangerous work in connection with certain works at Portsmouth.
- Frederick John Lewis, Leading Man (Diver), Chatham Dockyard. For courage, skill and resource exhibited in a marked degree.
- Alfred Leyland. For courage and self-sacrifice in carrying, out dangerous experiments.
- Albert Lickess. For great courage and high example shown in dealing with a fire at an explosives factory under circumstances of very exceptional danger.
- Arthur Lipscombe. For courage in stopping a fire in a powder factory under circumstances of exceptional danger to his life.
- Robert Andrew Lockwood, Skilled Workman, General Post Office. Has done exceptional service during rough weather in effecting repairs to submarine cables carrying naval and military wires.
- Tom Oliver Lodder, Skilled Workman, General Post Office. Showed great courage and devotion while in charge of a telegraph station, carrying out his duties under fire.
- Albert James Lowe. For courage in removing a large quantity of high explosives during a fire.
- Alice Ludlow. For courage and high example on the occasion of an explosion and prompt return to work.
- William McAlpine. For courage and self-sacrifice in returning to work after losing, three fingers of right, hand owing to an accident and before the wounds were properly healed.
- Agnes McCann. For courage and resource in saving the life of a fellow-worker entangled in dangerously running machinery, at great risk to her life.
- James McDonald. For courage in attempting to save the life of a fellow-worker who was gassed in a gas main by entering it at very great personal risk.
- James McDonald, Ironwork Erector. For courage in the rescue of fellow workmen who were overcome by gas.
- George McDougall. For courage in saving the lives of several fellow-workers who were buried in the lining of a furnace which they were repairing.
- Edward McFarlane. For courage in saving the lives of two of his fellow-workers by entering an ash receiver full of monoxide gas.
- James McGhie, Under Foreman Joiner. For bravery at the cost of serious personal injury in saving a half-blind labourer from being run over by a locomotive.
- Michael McGrath. For courage in ascending a furnace under conditions so dangerous that all others had refused to do so.
- May Louise Mclntyre. For courage and high example on the occasion of an accident at a filling factory.
- John McMaddocks, For great courage on the occasion of a fire in an explosives factory. He brought the drenchers into action, and used his own body to prevent draught fanning the flames in stoves.
- Albert Herbert Male. For courage on the occasion of a fire in an explosives factory.
- Daisy Marsh. For courage and resource in utilising emergency fire appliances on the occasion of an explosion at an explosives factory.
- Thomas Martin. For courage displayed on two occasions in dealing with an explosion and a fire at works producing highly inflammable liquids under circumstances of exceptional danger.
- Mollie Josephine Mason, Munition Worker, Chatham Dockyard. For courage and presence of mind in averting panic among women workers who were occupants of an overturned railway carriage.
- Robert Massey. For courage and self-sacrifice in carrying out dangerous experiments.
- John Master. For courage in preventing an explosion and fire at great personal risk.
- Edith Blanche Maw, Supervisor, Telephones. Displayed great courage and devotion to duty during air-raids.
- William Alfred Mayall. For courage and high example on the occasion of a fire in an explosives factory.
- Edward Medine. For courage in saving the lives of several fellow workers who, were buried in the lining of a furnace which they were repairing.
- Walter Mee. For courage and resource in dealing with a fire at the cost of bodily injury.
- James Menzies. For courage and high example on the occasion of a serious explosion.
- William Meredith. For courage in saving the life of a fellow workman who had been rendered unconscious by foul gas.
- Annie Dyer Merralls, Supervisor, Telephones. Displayed great courage and devotion to duty during air-raids.
- Robert Miller. For courage in saving the life of a fellow worker who was overcome by poisonous fumes, at great personal risk.
- Rose Mills. For courage displayed on the occasion of an explosion, at great personal risk.
- G. Mitchell. For courage in assisting to extinguish a fire which resulted in a very serious explosion.
- George Edgar Mitchell. For courage and high, example on several occasions of explosion and fire in a shell filling; factory.
- John Joseph Christopher Monks, Skilled Workman, General Post Office. On many occasions continued his work under fire, displaying great zeal and courage
- Margaret Moody, Telephonist. Displayed great courage and devotion to duty during air-raids.
- David George Morgan. For courage and high example in picking up and drowning a shell which had become accidentally ignited.
- William Morgan. For courage and resource in assisting to extinguish a fire at a filling factory, at imminent risk of serious explosion.
- Nora Morphet. For courage and high example in continuously working long hours in a poisonous atmosphere which habitually affected her health.
- Frederick Thomas Morris. For courage on the occasion of a fire in an explosives factory.
- Maggie Mulholland. For courage and very high example in her behaviour when in charge of a canteen adjoining a store of explosives which was on fire.
- George Myers. For courage and self-sacrifice in carrying out dangerous experiments.
- Abraham Naar, Sorter. Devotion to duty under specially difficult and dangerous circumstances.
- Thomas Nadin, Engineer of Yard Craft, Sheerness Dockyard. For courage, self-sacrifice and exceptional skill in the salvage of a merchant ship in a minefield.
- Arthur John Neal. For courage in a serious accident due to bursting of crucible of melted metal. Though severely injured, he kept the others calm and had them attended to first, though they were in less danger.
- Joan Nelson. For courage in continuing to work in an explosives factory, under circumstances of grave danger.
- George William Newson. For courage in fighting a fire caused by an explosion, at very great personal risk.
- Violet Newton. For courage in returning to work after a serious accident in which two workers were killed, and she was severely injured.
- G. R. Norris. For courage in remaining at his work during a fire which resulted in a very serious explosion, from which he suffered bodily injuries.
- James Joseph O'Callaghan. For courage in extinguishing a fire on the wooden roof of part of a filling factory, under exceptionally dangerous circumstances.
- Percy O'Keefe. For courage in assisting to extinguish a fire in an explosives factory, and removing explosives from the turning building.
- Edward Henry Lewis Owen, Cable Hand, General Post Office. Employed on cable ships and small craft in connection with war work in dangerous waters.
- Roland Basset Paine. For courage displayed on the occasion of a severe accident resulting in serious mutilation of his hand. He insisted on returning to his dangerous occupation as soon as bandages were removed.
- Nellie Ena Ann Palmer, Telephonist. Displayed great courage and devotion to duty during air-raids.
- Charles Parker, Skilled Labourer, Devonport Dockyard, For self-sacrifice and distinguished conduct whilst engaged on salvage operations.
- William Parker. For courage (1) in helping to extinguish a fire in tar works contiguous to filling factory at great personal risk; (2) in attempting to rescue a surveyor and workman gassed in a sewer, at great risk to his life.
- George Parkinson. For courage and resource in preventing a serious explosion at an explosives factory.
- Frederick Payne. For courage in dealing with a fire caused by an explosion, under exceptionally dangerous circumstances.
- Agnes Pearson, Telephonist. On the occasion of a very serious explosion at munition works she remained at her post until relieved, notwithstanding the fact that the explosions were almost continuous and that the police advised the officers on duty to leave the building.
- Georgina Peeters. For courage and resource in saving the life of a fellow-worker by stopping a machine at great risk to herself.
- Wilfred Edward Pendray. For courage in recovering the plug of a cock under circumstances of grave danger.
- Mary Pendreigh. For courage and high example on the occasion of an accident at a filling factory.
- Frederick William Pepper. For great courage in rescuing workers from burning explosives shops at great personal risk.
- Robert Charles Percy, Acting Inspector of Shipwrights (formerly Chargeman), Northern Base, For devotion to duty in effecting repairs under dangerous conditions.
- Agnes Mary Peters. For great courage and high example in continuing to do work of an exceptionally dangerous nature, which finally resulted in an accident, by which she was totally blinded and otherwise injured.
- Daniel Plume. For courage shown on the occasion of an explosion and at several minor fires, at great personal risk.
- Walter Plummer, Skilled Labourer, Portsmouth Dockyard. For courage and perseverance in the performance of his duties during an explosion.
- Walter Poll. For courage and high example in dealing with a serious fire at a gas works.
- John Thomas Poole, Master of Yard Craft, Chatham Dockyard, For perseverance and conspicuous skill under conditions of extreme difficulty and danger.
- Henry William John Porter, Skilled Workman, General Post Office. Showed courage and devotion to duty during repeated air-raids. On one occasion he set to work on the restoration of naval circuits while explosions were taking place fifty yards away.
- Ellen Lenora Potter. For courage and resource in extinguishing a fire, at great personal risk.
- James Pound. For self-sacrifice in working long hours in a highly poisonous atmosphere, where he was several times burnt by acid, and at times almost overcome by fumes.
- Harry Price. For courage and self-sacrifice in carrying out dangerous experiments.
- William Henry Price. For courage in attempting to stop a fire in an explosives factory under exceptionally dangerous circumstances. He lost four fingers and practically the use of both hands, while his face was permanently disfigured.
- William Thomas Pugh. For courage on the occasion of a fire in an explosives factory.
- Florence Pullen. For courage in continuing to work in spite of serious suffering from an accident caused by an explosion.
- Ethel Mary Pullinger, Telephonist. Displayed great courage and devotion to duty during air-raids.
- Richard Hayward Purser. For courage and self-sacrifice in working long hours in spite of severe physical disabilities brought about by hardships incurred in the retreat from Mons.
- Robert Rae, Coastwatcher, Machrihanish, Kintyre. For rendering valuable assistance to one of H.M. Ships under conditions of great difficulty.
- William H. Rawlin. For courage and high example in saving workers and maintaining order on the occasion of an explosion in a filling factory.
- William Dennis Reardon, Sorter. Devotion to duty under specially difficult and dangerous circumstances.
- Albert Edward Reeves. For courage in recovering the plug of a cock under circumstances of grave danger.
- Donald Renfrew, Chief Draughtsman, Kelvin, Bottomley & Baird, Ltd. For courage on the occasion of the trials of a submarine.
- Robert Roberts. For courage in saving the life of a fellow worker at a fire in an explosives factory, under exceptionally dangerous circumstances.
- George Robinson. For courage and self-sacrifice in carrying out dangerous experiments.
- Maggie Rock. For courage and high example on the occasion of an accident at a filling factory.
- Charles William Beaver Roll. For courage in attempting to rescue his foreman, by entering an ash receiver full of carbon monoxide gas.
- James Gordon Ross, Skilled Workman, General Post Office. Displayed courage and resource in maintaining telephonic communication during, an air-raid.
- Alfred Rudge. For courage in extinguishing a fire in an explosives factory at very great risk to his life.
- Thomas William Rudge, Millwright. For courage and coolness whilst engaged on dangerous work.
- John Ryan, Mate of Yard draft, Haulbowline Dockyard, For his splendid example of pluck and discipline during, salvage operations.
- Thomas Ryan. For courage in removing a large quantity of high explosives during a fire.
- Alfred Salenger. For courage and self-sacrifice in volunteering for work on dangerous experiments, in the course of which he lost four fingers.
- John Frederick Sams. For courage and high example in remaining at his post on a tram, and thus preventing severe casualties to fellow-workers. In doing so he was severely injured.
- Richard Sanders, Engine Fitter, Devonport Dockyard. For courage on the occasion of the trials of a new submarine.
- William Saunders. For courage in attempting to save the lives of workers who were gassed in a gas main, at very great personal risk.
- Edward Scott. For courage in averting a serious accident in a mill, at grave risk to his own life. His arm was badly crushed, and has since had to be amputated.
- Percy Sears. For courage and his example in preventing a fire in an explosives factory, at grave risk to his life.
- Charlie Shaw. For courage and resource in dealing with a fire at an explosives factory, at great personal risk.
- Leonard Short, Engine Fitter, Portsmouth Dockyard. For courage and self-sacrifice during salvage operations.
- Lawrence Simpson. For courage in extinguishing a fire on two occasions, at very great personal risk.
- Sydney Simpson, Skilled Workman, General Post Office. Showed great courage as well as resource on the occasion of a very severe explosion at adjoining munition works. He sent away to a safe place the women operators, and himself maintained uninterrupted telephonic communication.
- William Sinclair. For courage in rescuing a driver who was underneath a railway engine which had begun to move.
- Harry Skinner. For courage and resource (1) in extinguishing a fire in a filling factory at imminent risk of serious explosion, (2) in rescuing two fellow-workers gassed in a sewer, at very great personal risk.
- Laurence Skinner. For courage in attempting to stop a fire in an explosives factory under exceptionally dangerous circumstances.
- Frank Slater, For great courage shown during a fire in an explosives factory.
- Minnie Sleeford, Assistant Supervisor, Telephones. Displayed great courage and devotion to duty during air raids.
- Beatrice Evelyn Smith. For courage in returning to her post at the risk of her life in order to avert danger to the works.
- Francis Emily Esther Smith, Supervisor, Telephones. Displayed great courage and devotion to duty during air raids.
- John Smith. For courage in assisting to extinguish a fire in an explosives factory at great personal risk.
- Thomas William Fletcher Smith, Tug Master, Dover Dockyard. For courage, initiative and perseverance on salvage operations.
- James Snape. For courage and high example in quelling fires during an explosion at great personal risk.
- William Snead. For courage in entering a gas main and saving the lives of two workers who were gassed, at very great personal risk.
- Sidney Charles Soley. For courage and resource in dealing with a hand grenade about to explode, whereby he saved several lives.
- Hannah Spash. For courage and high example in continuing her work in a filling factory, after having been on three separate occasions injured by explosions.
- Edward Spencer. For courage and high example in continuing at work in an explosives factory under circumstances of grave danger.
- Sidney Arthur Stammers, Cable Hand, General Post Office. Employed on cable ships and small craft in connection with war work in dangerous waters.
- Lily Stanyon. For courage and resource in saving the life of a crane driver at considerable risk to herself.
- Edith Steed. For courage and high example in volunteering immediately after a fatal accident to undertake the more dangerous work in the Dept. concerned.
- Florence Eliza Steggel, Telephonist. Displayed great courage and devotion to duty during air raids.
- Fanny Eleanor Steward, Assistant Supervisor, Telephones. Displayed great courage and devotion to duty during air raids.
- John Stewart. For courage in remaining at work and seeing his job through after being severely shaken by an explosion at an explosives factory.
- George William Stocks, Leading Cable Hand. Employed on cable ships and small craft in connection with war work in dangerous waters.
- Walter Stokes. For courage in attempting to save the lives of two workers who were gassed in a gas main by entering it at very great personal risk.
- William Leverington Stokes. For courage in volunteering to extinguish a fire at cost of serious injuries.
- George Robert Stone, Master of Yard Craft, Sheerness Dockyard. For courage, self-sacrifice and exception, all in skill in the salvage of a merchant ship in a minefield.
- Maggie Storey. For courage and high example in extinguishing a dangerous fire at an explosives factory under exceptionally risky circumstances.
- Ernest Stubley. For courage in remaining at his post in circumstances of considerable danger in order to safeguard the works.
- Robert Studbohne. For courage and resource in preventing a serious explosion at an explosives factory.
- Gilbert George Sutcliffe, Inspector, Engineering Dept., General Post Office. Rendered valuable service in the construction and maintenance of telephones under fire.
- Herbert Sykes. For courage in testing aircraft in spite of severe accidents.
- Walter William James Symons, Shipwright Apprentice. For courage and presence of mind in the rescue of a fellow-workman from drowning.
- Samuel William Tabb, Acting Mate of Yard Craft, Devonport Dockyard. For courage and skill in handling his tug in assisting to rescue a torpedoed merchant ship from a dangerous position in heavy weather.
- Joseph Edward Talbot. For courage in continuing to work in a poisonous atmosphere, even though suffering seriously from effects.
- Alfred Tansom, Chargeman of Baggers, Portsmouth Dockyard. For courage and coolness in urgent salvage operations.
- Frederick Francis Taylor. For courage in fighting a fire at great personal risk while many bags of explosives were being removed.
- George Terry. For courage in working continuously under circumstances of very great danger.
- Charles William Thome, Engineer, For perseverance and devotion to duty in trying circumstances, often attended by considerable danger.
- Samuel George Thorneycroft. For courage on the occasion of a fire in an explosives factory.
- Thomas Tickner. For courage and resource in dealing with an outbreak of fire at a filling factory.
- William John Tidey. For courage in fighting a fire, caused by an explosion, at very great personal risk.
- Joseph Henry Trask, Special Constable. For courage in rescuing injured men from a burning and collapsed building at great personal risk.
- Walter Trebble, Skilled Labourer, Works Department, Portsmouth Dockyard, For great skill and daring in the performance of difficult and dangerous work in connection with certain works at Portsmouth.
- William Trotman, Engine Fitter, Devonport Dockyard. For courage on the occasion of the trials of a new submarine.
- Ella Trout, While fishing, accompanied only by a boy of ten, she saw that a steamer had been torpedoed and was sinking. Though fully realising the danger she ran from enemy submarines, she pulled rapidly to the wreck and succeeded in rescuing a drowning sailor.
- Alfred Clifford George Valentine. For courage and resource in dealing with a shell in which the top ring of the fuse had fired.
- E. Vass. For courage in stopping a fire in an explosives factory at grave risk to his life.
- Edith Emily Venus, Supervisor, Telephones. Displayed great courage and devotion to duty during air raids.
- Robert George Vicary. For courage displayed on the occasion of an explosion. He continued to work, though permanently injured by the accident.
- Mary Walker. For courage in continuing to work in an explosives factory under circumstances of grave danger.
- Ernest Wall, For two acts: of courage and self-sacrifice in clearing a choked acid main, and on the occasion of a fire in an explosives factory.
- John M. Wallace, Electrical Fitter. For courage, initiative and devotion to duty in trying circumstances.
- Lilian Blanche Wallace. For courage displayed during a time of great danger in a filling factory.
- Amelia Jane Ward, Telephonist. Displayed great courage and devotion to duty during air raids and bombardments from the sea.
- Daniel Vincent Ward, Inspector, Engineering Department, General Post Office. Displayed courage and resource while Controlling Officer in a neighbourhood exposed to many bombardments by sea-craft and aeroplanes.
- George Frederick Ward. For courage in shutting off outlet master valve of a gasholder during a fire caused by explosion, at serious personal risk.
- Nellie Ward, Supervisor, Telephones. Displayed great courage and devotion to duty during air raids.
- Frances Mary Watson. For courage on the occasion of a serious explosion and assisting a fellow-worker to escape at great personal danger.
- Frank Watson. For courage in removing a large quantity of high explosives during a fire.
- John Watson. For courage in attempting to rescue his foreman by entering an ash receiver full of carbon monoxide gas.
- Ada Watt. For courage in continuing to work in an explosives factory under circumstances of grave danger.
- Arthur Webber. For courage and resource in giving valuable assistance on the occasion of an explosion at an explosives factory.
- Dorothy Kate West, Telephonist. Displayed great courage and devotion to duty during air raids.
- George Whatton. For courage and resource in subduing a fire at imminent personal risk.
- Dorothy Florence Whibley, Telephonist. Displayed great courage and devotion to duty during an air raid.
- Robert Leonard White. For courage in remaining at his work after being very seriously injured.
- Mary Agnes Wilkinson, Telephonist. Rendered invaluable service at a telephone exchange on the occasion of a fire and serious explosion at a munition works close by, proceeding to her post through the danger zone at grave personal risk.
- William Williams. For courage and resource in extinguishing a fire under circumstances of exceptional danger.
- James Winter, Inspector, Engineering Department, General Post Office. Rendered special services in repairing wires under very dangerous conditions and was frequently under fire.
- Gertrude Wood, Supervisor, Telephones. Displayed great courage and devotion to duty during air raids.
- Alfred Charles Wright. For great courage in rescuing workers from burning explosives shops at great personal risk.
- William Wyatt, Skilled Labourer (Stoker), Sheerness Dockyard, For his self-sacrifice and devotion to duty in a time of danger.
- James Youll. For courage in saving the life of a fellow workman who had been rendered unconscious by foul gas.
- Alfred Charles Wright Young. For great courage in rescuing workers from burning explosives shops at great personal risk.

=== Distinguished Service Order (DSO) ===
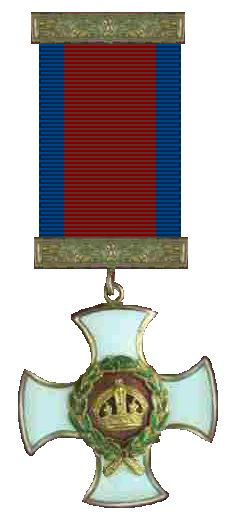
Riband and Badge of the Distinguished Service Order

- Vice-Admiral Evelyn Robert le Marchant
- Rear-Admiral Reginald Arthur Allenby, MVO
- Rear-Admiral Cyril Everard Tower
- Rear-Admiral Herbert Arthur Stevenson Fyler, CB
- Wing Commander Peregrine Forbes Morant Fellowes, RN
- Engineer Commander Mark Rundle, RN
- Staff Paymaster (Acting Fleet Paymaster) Hugh Miller, RN
- Staff Surgeon Henry Cooper, BA, RN
- Lieutenant-Commander (Acting Captain) Charles Mahon Redhead, RD, Royal Naval Reserve
- Flight Commander Alexander MacDonald Shook, DSC, Royal Naval Air Service
- Major Henry Shafto Adair, Cheshire Regiment
- Major Henry Rainier Adams, Royal Garrison Artillery.
- Local Colonel John Ainsworth, CMG, Royal Artillery Forces
- Reverend Michael Adler, Chaplain to the Forces, 3rd Class, Royal Army Chaplains' Department.
- Major Nigel Woodford Aitken, MC, Royal Garrison Artillery
- Captain (Acting Major) William Philip Jopp Akerman, MC, Royal Field Artillery
- Captain (Acting Lieutenant-Colonel) Edmund Alderson, MD, Royal Army Medical Corps
- Major and Brevet Lieutenant-Colonel (Temporary Lieutenant-Colonel) Percy Stuart Allan, Gordon Highlanders
- Captain (Temporary Major) Stanley Guy Allden, Army Service Corps
- Lieutenant-Colonel Lewis Arthur Allen, Army Service Corps
- Major Henry Irving Rodney Allfrey, MC, Somerset Light Infantry
- Captain Arthur Emilius David Anderson, MC, King's Own Scottish Borderers, Special Reserve
- Major (Acting Lieutenant-Colonel) Charles Abbot Anderson, Manchester Regiment
- Major and Brevet Lieutenant-Colonel (Temporary Lieutenant-Colonel) Cecil Ford Anderson, Royal Engineers
- Temporary Captain John Anderson, Royal Army Medical Corps
- Captain (Temporary Major) Walter Alexander Armitage, Special Reserve, York & Lancaster Regiment, and Machine Gun Corps
- Major Bening Mourant Arnold, Hampshire, Royal Garrison Artillery
- Major Francis Anson Arnold-Foster, Royal Field Artillery
- Captain (Acting Lieutenant-Colonel) Kenneth Hugh Lowden Arnott, MC, East Lancashire Regiment
- Major James Arnold Arrowsmith-Brown, Royal Engineers
- Lieutenant-Colonel Sydney William Louis Aschwanden, Royal Field Artillery
- Major Frederic St. John Atkinson, Horse, Indian Army
- Captain Henry Lancelot Aubrey-Fletcher, MVO, Grenadier Guards
- Captain Eric William Fane Aylwin-Foster, Army Service Corps
- Lieutenant-Colonel Stafford Charles Babington, Royal Engineers
- Major (Acting Lieutenant-Colonel) Edward Alec Horsman Bailey, Royal Field Artillery
- Reverend Charles Frederick Baines, MA, Chaplain the Forces, 1st Class, Royal Army Chaplains' Department
- Major (Temporary Lieutenant-Colonel) Sir Randolf Littlehales Baker, Bt, Yeomanry
- Temporary Major Robert Cecil Bamford, West Yorkshire Regiment
- Captain Kenneth Barge, MC, Cavalry, Indian Army
- Lieutenant-Colonel (Temporary Brigadier-General) Frederic Edward Lloyd Barker, Royal Field Artillery.
- Major Archibald Stonham Barnwell, Royal Field Artillery, Special Reserve
- Temporary Captain Robert McGowan Barrington-Ward, MC, General List
- Lieutenant-Colonel (Temporary Brigadier-General) Netterville Guy Barron, Royal Garrison Artillery
- Lieutenant-Colonel (Temporary Colonel) Harold Percy Waller Barrow, CMG, Royal Army Medical Corps
- Captain and Brevet Major (Acting Lieutenant-Colonel) Alfred James Napier Bartlett, Oxfordshire & Buckinghamshire Light Infantry
- Major John Channon Bassett, Royal Garrison Artillery
- Captain (Acting Major) Harold Henry Bateman, MC, Royal Engineers
- Captain (Acting Major) Austin Graves Bates, MC, Royal Field Artillery
- Major Cecil Robert Bates, MC, Reserve of Officers, Royal Field Artillery
- Major (Temporary Lieutenant-Colonel) Lancelot Richmond Beadon, Army Service Corps
- Major (Temporary Lieutenant-Colonel) Robert Longfield Beasley, Gloucestershire Regiment
- Captain Lancelot Edward Becher, Royal Engineers
- Lieutenant-Colonel William Thomas Clifford Beckett, North Lancashire Regiment, Territorial Force
- Temporary Major Charles Thomas Cook Beecroft, Army Service Corps
- Captain Hugh Maurice Bellamy, MC, Lincolnshire Regiment
- Temporary Major (Acting Lieutenant-Colonel) Robert Benzie, South Wales Borderers
- Temporary Lieutenant-Colonel Julian Falvey Beyts, Durham Light Infantry
- Major (Temporary Lieutenant-Colonel) Harold Francis Bidder, Royal Sussex Regiment, Special Reserve, attached Machine Gun Corps
- Captain and Brevet Major (Acting Major) George Travers Biggs, Royal Engineers
- Captain (Acting Major) David Anderson Bingham, Liverpool Regiment
- Lieutenant-Colonel Alexander Harry Colvin Birch, retired pay, Royal Artillery.
- Reverend Richard Bird, Temporary Chaplain to the Forces, 4th Class, Royal Army Chaplains' Department
- Temporary Captain (Acting Major) Benedict Birkbeck, MC, Coldstream Guards
- Captain Norman Pellew Birley, MC, South Staffordshire Regiment, Special Reserve
- Lieutenant-Colonel Arthur Birtwistle, CMG, Royal Field Artillery
- Captain (Temporary Major) Charles Gamble Bishop, Royal Engineers
- Reverend Harry William Blackburne, MC, MA, Chaplain to the Forces, 3rd Class, Royal Army Chaplains' Department.
- Captain (Temporary Lieutenant-Colonel) Frederick St. John Blacker, Rifle Brigade, Special Reserve
- 2nd Lieutenant (Temporary Major) Richard Graham Blomfield, Guards, and Royal Flying Corps
- Lieutenant-Colonel Herbert Richard Blore, King's Royal Rifle Corps
- Major (Temporary Lieutenant-Colonel) George Percy Cosmo Blount, Royal Artillery
- Major (Temporary Lieutenant-Colonel) Andrew George Board, South Wales Borderers and Royal Flying Corps
- Major (Acting Lieutenant-Colonel) Edward Leslie Bond, Royal Garrison Artillery
- Lieutenant-Colonel Francis Henry Borthwick, Royal Welsh Fusiliers
- Captain Malcolm Borwick, Dragoons
- Lieutenant-Colonel and Brevet Colonel Francis Wilford Boteler, Retired Pay, Royal Artillery
- Major (Acting Lieutenant-Colonel) Raymond Walter Harry Bourchier, Royal Field Artillery
- Temporary Major Aubrey Henry Bowden, Machine Gun Corps
- Major and Brevet Lieutenant-Colonel (Temporary Brigadier-General) Lionel Boyd Boyd-Moss, CMG, South Staffordshire Regiment
- Captain (Temporary Lieutenant-Colonel) Charles Roger Cavendish Boyle, Oxfordshire & Buckinghamshire Light Infantry
- Captain (Temporary Lieutenant-Colonel) Francis Lyndon Bradish, Royal Army Medical Corps
- Captain (Acting Lieutenant-Colonel) Frederick Hoysted Bradley, MB, Royal Army Medical Corps
- Captain (Temporary Lieutenant-Colonel) Samuel Glenholme Lennox Bradley, MC, London Regiment
- Temporary 2nd Lieutenant (Temporary Captain) Albert Newby Braithwaite, MC, General List
- Temporary Lieutenant-Colonel Francis Powell Braithwaite, MC, Royal Engineers
- Captain (Temporary Major, Acting Lieutenant-Colonel) Douglas Stephenson Branson, MC, York & Lancaster Regiment
- Captain (Acting Lieutenant-Colonel) Charles Stuart Brebner, MD, Royal Army Medical Corps
- Captain (Temporary Lieutenant-Colonel) Geoffrey Sydney Brewis, Welsh Regiment
- Major The Hon. Henry George Orlando Bridgeman, MC, Royal Artillery
- Captain Havard Noel Bridgwater, Norfolk Regiment
- Lieutenant-Colonel Edgar William Brighton, CMG, Bedfordshire Regiment
- Temporary Major Francis Edward Briscoe, Yorkshire Regiment
- Temporary Major Dyson Brock-Williams, Welsh Regiment
- Major Nevile Pattullo Brooke, Leinster Regiment
- Lieutenant-Colonel John Brown, 1/4th Battalion Northamptonshire Regiment.
- Temporary Major George Edward Allenby Browne, MC, Liverpool Regiment
- Captain (Acting Major) Hugh Swinton Browne, Royal Field Artillery
- Colonel Charles William Brownlow, Royal Garrison Artillery
- Captain (Acting Major) William Fox Bruce, MC, Royal Engineers
- Lieutenant-Colonel (Temporary Brigadier-General) Thomas Bruce, Royal Artillery
- Captain and Brevet Lieutenant-Colonel (Temporary Lieutenant-Colonel) Herbert Bryan, CMG, Reserve of Officers, retired pay, Manchester Regiment
- Major Leonard Corfield Bucknall, Yeomanry
- Temporary Captain (Acting Lieutenant-Colonel) Christopher Victor Bulstrode, MB, Royal Army Medical Corps
- Major Richard Seymour Bunbury, Royal Garrison Artillery
- Captain (Temporary Lieutenant-Colonel) Harold Burchall, Royal Flying Corps Special Reserve
- Major (Temporary Lieutenant-Colonel) Hubert George Richard Burges-Short, Somerset Light Infantry
- Lieutenant-Colonel Arnold Robinson Burrowes, CMG, Royal Irish Fusiliers
- Captain (Acting Major) Christopher Bushell, Royal West Surrey Regiment, Special Reserve
- Major and Brevet Lieutenant-Colonel (Temporary Lieutenant-Colonel) Bernard Arnold Barrington Butler, Royal Field Artillery
- Temporary Major The Hon. Robert Thomas Rowley Probyn Butler, MC, Tank Corps
- Major (Temporary Lieutenant-Colonel) William Erdeswick Ignatius Butler-Bowdon, Duke of Cornwall's Light Infantry
- Lieutenant-Colonel Charles Norman Buzzard, Royal Garrison Artillery
- Temporary Captain Walter Roderick Griffith Bye, MC, General List
- Temporary Lieutenant-Colonel The Hon. Antony Schomberg Byng, DSO, General List and Royal Flying Corps
- Temporary Major (Acting Lieutenant-Colonel) Alexander Francis Somerville Caldwell, North Lancashire Regiment
- Major (Acting Lieutenant-Colonel) Felix Call, Royal Irish Regiment
- Temporary Lieutenant-Colonel Ewen Allan Cameron, North Lancashire Regiment
- Reverend Edward Fitzhardinge Campbell, BA, Chaplain to the Forces, 3rd Class (Temporary Chaplain to the Forces, 2nd Class), Royal Army Chaplains' Department
- Major Hector Campbell, MVO, Indian Army
- Major (Acting Lieutenant-Colonel) The Hon. Ian Malcolm Campbell, Lovat's Scouts
- Major (Acting Lieutenant-Colonel) William Robert Campion, MP, Royal Sussex Regiment
- Lieutenant-Colonel (Temporary Colonel) Fernand Gustave Eugene Cannot, CMG, Army Service Corps
- Major (Temporary Lieutenant-Colonel) Alan Douglas Carden, Royal Engineers, and Royal Flying Corps
- Temporary Lieutenant (Acting Major) D'Arcy Vandeleur Carden, Royal Field Artillery
- Reverend Douglas Falkland Carey, MA, Chaplain to the Forces, 3rd Class, Temporary Chaplain to the Forces, 1st Class; Royal Army Chaplains' Department
- Captain John Charles Denton Carlisle, MC, London Regiment
- Temporary Captain (Acting Major) Thomas Hamilton Carlisle, Royal Engineers
- Captain Thomas Carnwath, MB, Royal Army Medical Corps
- Temporary Major Vincent Henry Cartwright, Royal Marine Artillery
- Lieutenant-Colonel Trevor Carus-Wilson, Duke of Cornwall's Light Infantry
- Temporary Major Frank Cassels, Royal Sussex Regiment
- Captain Geoffrey Cheetham, MC, Royal Engineers
- Major Lawrence Chenevix-Trench, Royal Engineers
- Major William Francis Christian, Royal Garrison Artillery
- Captain (Temporary Lieutenant-Colonel) Archibald Christie, Royal Artillery, and Royal Flying Corps
- Major (Acting Lieutenant-Colonel) Henry Robert Stark Christie, Royal Engineers
- Major (Acting Lieutenant-Colonel) Herbert Nicholls Clark, Royal Field Artillery
- Major Frederick Arthur Stanley Clarke, London Regiment
- Temporary Captain Denzil Harwood Clarke, MC, Durham Light Infantry
- Lieutenant-Colonel Robert Clarke, Army Service Corps
- Major and Brevet Lieutenant-Colonel (Temporary Lieutenant-Colonel) Reginald Graham Clarke, Royal West Surrey Regiment, and Machine Gun Corps
- Temporary Major Gerald Malcolm Clayton, Liverpool Regiment
- Major Francis Alfred Worship Cobbold, Royal Garrison Artillery
- Major (Acting Lieutenant-Colonel) Herbert Philip Gordon Cochran, Middlesex Regiment
- Lieutenant-Colonel Edward Webber Warren Cochrane, MB, Royal Army Medical Corps
- Major Douglas Fanley Colson, Royal Engineers
- Major (Acting Lieutenant-Colonel) Richard Coffey, Royal Army Medical Corps
- Major and Brevet Lieutenant-Colonel (Temporary Brigadier-General) Edward Sacheverell d'Ewes Coke, CMG, King's Own Scottish Borderers
- Major (Temporary Lieutenant-Colonel) Alfred Methven Collard, Duke of Cornwall's Light Infantry
- Captain (Temporary Lieutenant-Colonel) Richard Hamilton Collier, Royal Flying Corps, Special Reserve
- Major (Temporary Lieutenant-Colonel) Reginald Thomas Collins, Royal Army Medical Corps
- Temporary Major William Alexander Collins, Army Service Corps
- Captain (Temporary Major) Henry Gordon Comber, Unattached List
- Reverend John Morgan Connor, MA, Chaplain to the Forces, 4th Class, (Temporary Chaplain to the Forces, 3rd Class), Royal Army Chaplains' Department
- Major (Acting Lieutenant-Colonel) Dudley Cookes, Royal Field Artillery
- Reverend James Ogden Coop, MA, Chaplain to the Forces, 1st Class, Territorial Force, Royal Army Chaplains' Department
- Major (Temporary Lieutenant-Colonel) Frank Sandiford Cooper, Suffolk Regiment
- Temporary Lieutenant-Colonel William Coote-Brown, Royal Sussex Regiment
- Captain Edward Roux Littledale Corballis, Royal Dublin Fusiliers, and Royal Flying Corps
- Major Geoffrey Ronald Codrington, Yeomanry
- Captain and Brevet Major (Temporary Lieutenant-Colonel) Gordon Philip Lewes Cosens, Dragoons
- Major Reginald Foulkes Cottrell, Royal Garrison Artillery
- Major (Acting Lieutenant-Colonel) Miles Rafe Ferguson Courage, Reserve of Officers, Royal Artillery
- Major (Temporary Lieutenant-Colonel) Robert Blaster Cousens, Royal Artillery
- Major Arthur James Cowan, Royal Field Artillery
- Temporary Major (Temporary Lieutenant-Colonel) William Henry Coysh, Royal Engineers
- Major (Temporary Lieutenant-Colonel) James Craik, Reserve of Officers, Retired Pay, Indian Army Lancers
- Major George Craster, Indian Army Cavalry
- Major and Brevet Lieutenant-Colonel (Temporary Brigadier-General) Arthur Julius Craven, Royal Engineers
- Temporary Major Edward William Crawford, Royal Inniskilling Fusiliers
- Captain (Temporary Major) William Loftus Crawford, Lancashire Fusiliers
- Reverend Canon Thomas Emerson Crawhall, Chaplain to the Forces, 2nd Class, Territorial Force, Royal Army Chaplains' Department
- Quarter-Master and Honorary Major Hugh Cressingham, Bedfordshire Regiment
- Major The Honourable Frederick Heyworth Cripps, Yeomanry
- Major (Temporary Lieutenant-Colonel) Sir Morgan George Crofton, Bt, Life Guards
- Major (Temporary Lieutenant-Colonel) John Frank Crombie, Royal Army Medical Corps
- Major (Acting Lieutenant-Colonel) Arthur Edwin Cronshaw, Manchester Regiment
- Major (Acting Lieutenant-Colonel) Bernard Cruddas, Northumberland Fusiliers
- Captain (Acting Major) Arthur Ludlam Cruickshank, Royal Garrison Artillery
- Temporary Major Bertram Stephen Rowsell Cunningham, Army Service Corps
- Captain (Acting Lieutenant-Colonel) Richard Robinson Curling, Royal Artillery
- Captain (Acting Major) Hubert Montague Cotton-Curtis, North Staffordshire Regiment
- Major and Brevet Lieutenant-Colonel (Temporary Brigadier-General) Evan Campbell da Costa, East Lancashire Regiment
- Temporary Major Thomas William Daniel, MC, Nottinghamshire and Derbyshire Regiment
- Captain (Temporary Lieutenant-Colonel) Neville Reay Daniell, Duke of Cornwall's Light Infantry
- Major William Augustus Bampfylde Daniel, Royal Horse Artillery
- Captain (Temporary Major) Markham David, Monmouthshire Regiment, Royal Engineers, Special Reserve
- Major Thomas Jenkins David, Royal Horse Artillery
- Major (Acting Lieutenant-Colonel) Alan Hier Davies, Royal Field Artillery
- Temporary Lieutenant-Colonel John Edward Henry Davies, Royal Army Medical Corps
- Temporary Major Gilbert Davidson, Army Service Corps
- Captain (Temporary Major) Owen Stanley Davies, Royal Engineers
- 2nd Lieutenant (Temporary Major) Thomas Henry Davies, MC, Royal Engineers
- Temporary Major William Hathaway Davis, MC, Machine Gun Corps
- Captain Hugh Frank Dawes, MC, Royal Fusiliers
- Captain (Acting Lieutenant-Colonel) Harold John Dear, London Regiment
- Captain Philip de Fonblanque, Royal Engineers
- Temporary Major Thomas Lyttleton de Havilland, Royal Scots Fusiliers (Major, South African Defence Force)
- Major (Temporary Lieutenant-Colonel) John Nathael de la Perrelle, MC, Royal Fusiliers, Special Reserve
- Captain (Acting Lieutenant-Colonel) James Finlay Dempster, Reserve of Officers, Manchester Regiment
- Temporary Captain Eustace Charles de Neufville, Royal Garrison Artillery
- Captain and Brevet Major Henry Denison Denison-Pender, MC, Dragoons
- Lieutenant-Colonel Bertie Coore Dent, Leicestershire Regiment, Cheshire Regiment
- Major John Neston Diggle, Royal Field Artillery
- Lieutenant (Temporary Captain) Francis Ivan Leslie Ditmas, MC, Reserve of Officers, Durham Light Infantry
- Major Peter Doig, Royal Garrison Artillery
- Captain (Temporary Major) Harry Cecil Dolphin, Reserve of Officers, Hampshire Regiment
- Temporary Captain (Acting Major) Frederick Langloh Donkin, Royal Field Artillery
- Major Alan Sydney Whitehorn Dore, Worcestershire Regiment, and Royal Flying Corps
- Major Francis Holland Dorling, Manchester Regiment
- Captain (Temporary Major) Edward Cecil Doyle, Royal Army Veterinary Corps
- Captain and Brevet Major (Temporary Lieutenant-Colonel) Reginald John Drake, Reserve of Officers, North Staffordshire Regiment
- Major Harold Bruce Dresser, Royal Field Artillery, Special Reserve
- Captain (Temporary Lieutenant-Colonel) Cecil Francis Drew, Scottish Rifles
- Major (Temporary Lieutenant-Colonel) George Barry Drew, West Yorkshire Regiment
- Major Horace Robert Hawley Drew, Northamptonshire Regiment
- Lieutenant (Temporary Major) William Stuart Gordon Drummond, Army Service Corps, Special Reserve
- Major Ralph Duckworth, South Staffordshire Regiment
- Major (Temporary Lieutenant-Colonel) Robert Maxwell Dudgeon, MC, Cameron Highlanders
- Major (Honorary Captain in Army) William Marshall Dugdale, Royal Welsh Fusiliers
- Captain Donald Duncan, MC, Gloucestershire Regiment
- Major (Temporary Lieutenant-Colonel) Horace Adrian Duncan, Argyll and Sutherland Highlanders
- Major (Temporary Lieutenant-Colonel) Norman Edwin Dunkerton, Royal Army Medical Corps
- Captain Thomas Spence Dunn, East Africa Medical Service
- Major (Acting Lieutenant-Colonel) Guy Edward Jervoise Durnford, Royal Engineers
- Major Bernard Alfred Saunders Dyer, Army Service Corps
- Major and Brevet Lieutenant-Colonel (Temporary Colonel) Percyvall Hart Dyke, Baluchis, Indian Army
- Major Gerald Lang Dymott, Royal Field Artillery
- Captain (Acting Lieutenant-Colonel) Bruce Lindsay Eddis, Royal Engineers
- Captain Harold Walter Edwards, MC, Royal Warwickshire Regiment
- Temporary Major Richard Prior Ferdinand Edwards, Army Service Corps
- Captain (Acting Lieutenant-Colonel) William Egan, MB, Royal Army Medical Corps
- Captain Horace Anson Eiloart, MC, London Regiment
- Major William Gardiner Eley, retired pay, Reserve of Officers.
- Captain Garrard Elgood, Reserve of Officers, Royal West Kent Regiment
- Captain (Acting Major) Edward Charles Ellice (retired), Grenadier Guards
- Major (Temporary Lieutenant-Colonel) Edward Halhed Hugh Elliot, Royal Field Artillery
- Temporary Lieutenant-Colonel Thomas Renton Elliott, Royal Army Medical Corps
- Captain (Temporary Major) Arthur Addison Ellwood, MC, Lincolnshire Regiment, attached Machine Gun Corps
- Temporary Lieutenant-Colonel Wilfred Elstob, MC, Manchester Regiment
- Major (Temporary Lieutenant-Colonel) Sir Francis Napier Elphinstone-Dalrymple, Bt, Royal Artillery
- 2nd Lieutenant (Temporary Captain) Charles Adrian Ashford Elton, Royal Warwickshire Regiment
- Major Robert Emmet Sr., Yeomanry
- Lieutenant-Colonel Cuthbert Evans, CMG, Royal Artillery
- Major (Acting Lieutenant-Colonel) William Harry Evans, Royal Engineers
- Major Alfred Howell Evans-Gwynne, Royal Field Artillery
- Captain (Acting Major) Eliott Nial Evelegh, MC, Royal Engineers
- Captain (Acting Lieutenant-Colonel) Thomas Swan Eves, MB, Royal Army Medical Corps
- Major Charles Nicholson Ewart, Royal Garrison Artillery
- Major William Turner Ewing, Royal Scots
- Temporary Major John Knox Ewart, Army Service Corps
- Temporary Major (Acting Lieutenant-Colonel) Cresswell John Eyres, Royal Garrison Artillery (late Rear=Admiral, reired, Royal Navy).
- Major (Acting Lieutenant-Colonel) Bernard Joseph Fagan, Infantry, Indian Army
- Captain Harold Arthur Thomas Fairbank, FRCS, Royal Army Medical Corps
- Lieutenant-Colonel Brereton Fairclough, CMG, South Lancashire Regiment
- Captain (Temporary Major) Arthur Wellesley Falconer, MD, Royal Army Medical Corps
- Temporary Lieutenant-Colonel Ronald Dundas Falconar-Stewart, Argyll and Sutherland Highlanders
- Captain (Temporary Lieutenant-Colonel) Arthur Thomas Falwasser, Royal Army Medical Corps
- Major (Temporary Lieutenant-Colonel) William Alexander Farquhar, Royal Scots Fusiliers
- Captain (Acting Major) John Arthur Joseph Farrell, Leinster Regiment, Special Reserve
- Major (Temporary Lieutenant-Colonel) Paul John Fearon, Royal West Surrey Regiment
- Temporary Major Francis Hood Fernie, Tank Corps
- Major Maurice Christian Festing, Royal Marine Light Infantry
- Captain (Acting Major) Linwood Field, MC, Royal Artillery
- Major (Temporary Lieutenant-Colonel) Harold Stuart Filsell, Royal Warwickshire Regiment
- Major John Alexander Findlay, Highland Light Infantry
- Major Walter Taylor Finlayson, Indian Medical Service
- Major (Acting Lieutenant-Colonel) David Leonard Fisher, MB, Royal Army Medical Corps
- Major James Thackeray Fisher, Royal Engineers
- Temporary Major Arthur Stanley Fitzgerald, Royal Warwickshire Regiment
- Captain Edward Herbert Fitzherbert, MC, Army Service Corps
- Captain Terrick Charles Fitzhugh, MVO, Reserve of Officers, Royal Irish Regiment
- Captain and Brevet Major Noel Trew Fitzpatrick, MC, Royal Engineers
- Lieutenant-Colonel Archibald Nicol Fleming, MB, FRCS, Indian Medical Service
- Lieutenant-Colonel Frank Fleming, Royal Field Artillery
- Captain Percy Beresford Fleming, Army Service Corps
- Captain (Acting Lieutenant-Colonel) The Hon. Gerald William Frederick Savile Foljambe, Reserve of Officers, late Oxfordshire & Buckinghamshire Light Infantry
- Major (Temporary Lieutenant-Colonel) (retired Lieutenant-Colonel, Territorial Force) Richard Mildmay Foot, CMG, Reserve of Officers, Royal Inniskilling Fusiliers
- Lieutenant (Temporary Captain) Stephen Henry Foot, Royal Engineers, Special Reserve
- Major (Acting Lieutenant-Colonel) Nowell Barnard de Lancey Forth, MC, Manchester Regiment
- Temporary Captain (Acting Major) William Nelson Foster, Army Service Corps
- Major Cecil Fowler, Royal Field Artillery
- Temporary Major George Fox, General List
- Reverend Henry Watson Fox, (Chaplain to the Forces, 4th Class), (Temporary Chaplain to the Forces, 3rd Class), Royal Army Chaplains' Department
- Captain (Acting Major) The Hon. Alastair Thomas Joseph Fraser, Lovat's Scouts (Cameron Highlanders)
- Lieutenant (Temporary Lieutenant-Colonel) John Alexander Fraser, Dragoon Guards
- Lieutenant-Colonel Thomas Fraser, MB, Royal Army Medical Corps
- Captain (Acting Lieutenant-Colonel) The Hon. William Fraser, MC, Gordon Highlanders
- Temporary Major The Hon. Edward Gerald French, General List
- Captain (Acting Major) John Roberts Frend, Leinster Regiment
- Major Charles Gibson Fulton, Royal Field Artillery
- Lieutenant-Colonel Willoughby Furnivall, Royal Field Artillery.
- Major William Fleetwood Fuller, Yeomanry
- Captain Edward Keith Byrne Furze, MC, Royal West Surrey Regiment
- Major Edgar David Galbraith, Indian Army
- Major (Temporary Lieutenant-Colonel) Charles Edward Galwey, Reserve of Officers, late Royal Irish Regiment
- Major (Temporary Lieutenant-Colonel) Aylmer George Galloway, Army Service Corps
- Major Robert Leech Galloway, Royal Field Artillery
- Captain (Acting Lieutenant-Colonel) William Boss Gardner, MB, Royal Army Medical Corps
- Major William Garforth, MC, Royal Engineers
- Major Henry Percy Garwood, Royal Garrison Artillery
- Major John Reginald Garwood, Royal Engineers
- Temporary Lieutenant-Colonel Cecil Claud Hugh Orby Gascoigne, Worcestershire Regiment
- Captain Eric Gerald Gauntlett, MB, Royal Army Medical Corps
- Captain Cyril Herbert Gay, Royal Artillery
- 2nd Lieutenant (Temporary Major) Frederick George Peter Gedge, Royal Engineers
- Captain (Acting Lieutenant-Colonel) William Charles Coleman Gell, MC, Royal Warwickshire Regiment.
- Captain Alfred Joseph Gibbs, MC, Royal Field Artillery
- Major Hugh Edward Gibbs, Royal Army Veterinary Corps
- Captain Alexander John Gibson, Royal Army Medical Corps, Special Reserve
- Captain (Acting Lieutenant-Colonel) Harold Gibson, Royal Army Medical Corps
- Temporary Major Joseph Gibson, Army Service Corps
- Major Lewis Gibson, Royal Highlanders
- Temporary Major (Temporary Lieutenant-Colonel) Donald Hope Gibsone, Royal Engineers
- Captain John Galbraith Gill MC, MB, Royal Army Medical Corps
- Major (Temporary Lieutenant-Colonel) Reynold Alexander Gillam, Royal Engineers
- Lieutenant-Colonel John Gilmour Jr., Royal Highlanders
- Temporary Captain (Acting Major) Sydney Elliot Glendenning, Royal Engineers
- Lieutenant (Acting Major) Kenneth Bruce Godsell, MC, Royal Engineers
- Major and Brevet Lieutenant-Colonel Charles Alexander Campbell Godwin, Cavalry Indian Army
- Major George Edward Goldsmith, Army Service Corps
- Temporary Lieutenant-Colonel William Richard Goodwin, Royal Irish Rifles
- Major Alexander Robert Gisborne Gordon, Royal Irish Regiment
- Lieutenant-Colonel George Hamilton Gordon, Royal Field Artillery
- Major (Acting Lieutenant-Colonel) Granville Cecil Douglas Gordon, Welsh Guards
- Major Richard Glegg Gordon, Lowland Royal Garrison Artillery.
- Major William Gordon, Royal Garrison Artillery
- Major and Brevet Lieutenant-Colonel (Temporary Brigadier-General) Lord Esmé Charles Gordon-Lennox, MVO, Scots Guards
- Captain and Brevet Major Eric Gore-Browne, London Regiment
- Lieutenant-Colonel (Temporary Brigadier-General) Michael Derwas Goring-Jones, CMG, Durham Light Infantry
- Reverend Thomas Sydney Goudge, Chaplain to the Forces, 2nd Class (Temporary Chaplain to the Forces, 1st Class), Royal Army Chaplains' Department
- 2nd Lieutenant (Acting Major) Arthur Ernest Gould, MC, Royal Engineers
- Major (Acting Lieutenant-Colonel) John Maxwell Gover, MB, Royal Army Medical Corps
- Captain (Temporary Lieutenant-Colonel) Malise Graham, Lancers
- Major Roland Cecil Douglas Graham, Royal Garrison Artillery
- Major Hubert Francis Grant-Suttie, MC, Royal Artillery
- Major (Temporary Lieutenant-Colonel) (Captain, Retired Pay) Bernard Granville, Yeomanry
- Lieutenant-Colonel (Temporary Colonel) Henry William Grattan, Royal Army Medical Corps
- Captain and Brevet Major Stafford Henry Green, MC, West Yorkshire Regiment
- Major (Temporary Lieutenant-Colonel) Wilfrith Gerald Key Green, Indian Army
- Tmp Major Frederick Harry Greenhough, Royal Engineers
- Maj. William Basil Greenwell, Durham Light Inf.
- Maj. Charles Francis Hill Greenwood, London Reg.
- Tmp Major Richard Hugo Gregg MC Royal Fusiliers
- Capt. William Thornton Huband Gregg, Royal Irish Fusiliers
- Capt. George Pascoe Grenfell, Royal Flying Corps
- Rev. John Wesley Elnox Griffin Royal Army Chaplains' Dept.
- Tmp Lt.-Col. Edward Waldegrave Griffith, Royal Arty.
- Lt. Edward William Macleay Grigg MC Grenadier Guards
- Tmp 2nd Lt. Hugh Noel Grimwade MC General List
- Capt. Ewart Scott Grogan, Unattd. List, East African Forces
- Maj. and Bt. Lt.-Col. Herbert Watkins Grubb, Border Reg.
- Tmp Major Frederick Henry Wickham Guard, Royal Scots
- Lt.-Col. Frederick Gordon Guggisberg CMG Royal Engineers
- Lt. Eric Cecil Guinness, Royal Irish Reg.
- Maj. Hamilton Bruce Leverson. Gower Gunn MC Royal Garrison Arty.
- Capt. Arthur Henry Habgood RAMC
- Lt.-Col. Bernard Haigh, Army Service Corps
- Wing Cmdr. Frederick Crosby Halahan MVO Royal Naval Air Service
- Tmp Lt.-Col. Frederick Hall MP Royal Field Arty.
- Lt.-Col. Robert Sydney Hamilton CMG Army Ordnance Depot
- Capt. Denys Huntingford Hammonds MC Royal Engineers
- Tmp Major Claude Hancock, Gloucestershire Reg.
- Maj. John Haig, Yeomanry
- Maj. Mortimer Pawson Hancock, Royal Fusiliers
- Tmp Capt. William Charles Hand MC Royal Garrison Arty.
- Maj. and Bt. Lt.-Col. Edward Barnard Hanley, Worcestershire Reg., attd. Tank Corps
- Capt. Hubert Arthur Oldfield Hanley, Middlesex Reg.
- Lt.-Col. Cathcart Christian Hannay, Dorsetshire Reg.
- Capt. Frank Stephen Hanson MC Royal Warwickshire Reg.
- Tmp Major Cecil Claud Alexander Hardie, Royal Engineers
- Tmp Capt. George Richardson Harding, Royal Engineers
- Capt. Thomas Hubert Harker, King's Royal Rifle Corps
- Capt. Charles Harry Hart MC Army Service Corps
- Tmp Capt. Owen Hart, Royal Field Arty.
- Maj. Charles Darby Harvey, Nottinghamshire and Derbyshire Reg.
- Maj. Cosmo George Sinclair Harvey, Royal Field Arty.
- Maj. Gardiner Hassell Harvey, Army Service Corps
- Capt. and Hon. Major John Harvey (retired)
- Capt. Percy Lovell Clare Haslam, Hussars, attd. Tank Corps
- Maj. Randal Plunkett Taylor Hawksley, Royal Engineers
- Capt. James George Hay, late Gordon Highlanders
- Capt. Geoffrey Hayes, Durham Light Inf.
- Maj. William Burrell Hayley, Royal Horse Arty.
- Tmp Lt.-Col. George William Hayward, Royal Field Arty., Riding Master and Hon. Major (retired)
- Lt. Eustace Fellowes Sinclair Hawkins, Army Service Corps
- Maj. Thomas Hazelrigg, Army Service Corps
- Capt. Cuthbert Morley Headlam, Bedford Yeomanry
- Maj. Arthur Basset Hearle, Royal Garrison Arty.
- Maj. GeorgeNoah Heath, Cheshire Reg.
- Capt. Joseph Thomas Heath MC Royal Engineers
- Maj. Vincent James Heather, Royal Arty.
- Capt. Alfred George Hebblethwaite, RAMC
- Maj. Percival John Beresford Heelas, Royal Field Arty.
- Lt.-Col. Harry Dal ton Henderson, Army Service Corps
- Lt.-Col. Lionel Lees Hepper, Royal Garrison Arty.
- Maj. and Bt. Lt.-Col. William Francis Hessey, Royal Inniskilling Fusiliers
- Capt. Charles Caulfield Hewitt MC Royal Inniskilling Fusiliers, and Machine Gun Corps
- Maj. Gerald Heygate, Royal Field Arty.
- Lt.-Col. Sir Graham Percival Heywood Bt 1st Staffordshire Yeomanry
- Tmp Lt. Herbert John Hill, Royal Engineers
- Maj. Rowland Clement Ridley Hill, Royal Engineers
- Maj. Francis Barrett Hills, Royal Garrison Arty.
- Lt.-Col. Harry Alexander Hinge CMG RAMC
- Capt. and Temp Major Charles Faunce Hitchins, Royal West Kent Reg.
- Col. Reginald Hoare, 4th Hussars
- Tmp Major Harry Roy Hobson, Army Service Corps
- Capt. Adam Hodgins, Royal Army Veterinary Corps
- Lt.-Col. William Holdsworth Holdsworth Hunt, Royal Garrison Arty.
- Lt. Henry Arthur Hollond, Royal Garrison Arty.
- Tmp Major Francis John Courtenay Hood, York & Lancaster Reg.
- Maj. John Charles Hooper, Shropshire Light Inf.
- Capt. and Bt. Major Robert Victor Galbraith Horn MC Royal Scots Fusiliers
- Maj. George John Houghton, RAMC
- Lt.-Col. John William Hobart, Houghton RAMC
- Capt. Charles Kenneth Howard-Bury, King's Royal Rifle Corps Spec. Reserve
- Lt.-Col. Walter Howell Jones, Royal Garrison Arty.
- Q.M. and Hon. Major James Thomas Harold Hudson, Middlesex Reg.
- Tmp Capt. Henry Moore Hudspeth MC Royal Engineers
- Capt. Basil Hughes FRCS RAMC
- Maj. Edward William Hughes MC London Reg.
- Maj. William Hughes MC London Reg.
- Maj. Henry Horne Hulton, Royal Field Arty.
- Maj. Walter Vernon Hume, South Lancashire Reg.
- Maj. George Noel Humphreys, Army Service Corps
- Maj. Rochford Noel Hunt RAMC
- Maj. (temporary Lt.-Col.) Reginald Seager Hunt, Dragoon Guards
- Capt. Cecil Stuart Hunter, Royal Arty.
- Tmp Major Hugh Blackburn Hunter, Army Service Corps
- Maj. Henry Noel Alexander Hunter, Royal West Surrey Reg.
- Tmp Lt.-Col. Arthur Reginald Hurst, Royal Field Arty.
- Maj. Ralph Hamer Husey MC London Reg.
- Capt. Colin Ross Marshall Hutchison MC Royal Field Arty.
- Q.M. and Hon. Major Thomas Charles Ibbs, London Reg.
- Lt.-Col. Henry Wilson Iles, Royal Garrison Arty.
- Capt. Bernhardt Basil von Brumsy im Thurn MC Hampshire Reg.
- Maj. Charles Elliott Inglis, Royal Garrison Arty.
- Tmp Major Richard Inglis, King's Royal Rifle Corps
- Maj. Thomas Stewart Inglis, Royal Field Arty.
- Tmp Lt.-Col. Arthur Innes Irons, Middlesex Reg.
- Capt. Noel Mackintosh Stuart Irwin MC Essex Reg.
- Maj. William Rennie Izat, Royal Engineers
- Capt. Edward Darby Jackson, King's Own Scottish Borderers
- Tmp Major Frank Whitford Jackson, Army Service Corps
- Maj. and Bt. Lt.-Col. Herbert William Jackson, Indian Army
- Maj. Richard Rolt Brash Jackson, Army Service Corps
- Maj. Arthur Lawrence Baldwin Jacob, Royal Garrison Arty.
- Tmp Major Archibald Hugh James, Northumberland Fusiliers, West Yorkshire Reg.
- Maj. and Bt. Lt.-Col. Ralph Ernest Haweis James CMG North Lancashire Reg.
- Maj. Cyril Jarrett, Middlesex Reg.
- Tmp Capt. Arthur Alfred Jayne MC Royal Engineers
- Maj. Richard Griffith Bassett Jeffreys, Royal Dublin Fusiliers
- Maj. Leoline Jenkins MC Dorset, Royal Garrison Arty. and Royal Flying Corps
- Maj. Sir Walter Kentish William Jenner Bt late 9th Lancers
- Lt.-Col. Arthur Stawell Jenour CMG Royal Garrison Arty.
- Maj. Arthur Baynes Johnson, Lincolnshire Reg.
- Lt.-Col. Allen Victor Johnson, Royal Fusiliers, King's Royal Rifle Corps
- Tmp Major Benjamin Sandford Johnson, Army Service Corps
- Maj. Victor Neville Johnson, Gloucestershire Reg.
- Tmp Lt.-Col. Frederick Campbell Johnston, Royal Arty.
- Maj. George Bernard Johnson, Royal Field Arty.
- Tmp Lt.-Col. William Hamilton Hall Johnston MC Middlesex Reg.
- Maj. Harry Haweis Joll MC Royal Arty.
- Maj. Archibald Nelson Gavin Jones, Indian Army
- Lt.-Col. John Josselyn, Suffolk Reg.
- Capt. Edward James Kavanagh MC RAMC
- Maj. Thomas Kay RAMC
- Maj. Gerard Ainslie Kompthorne, RAMC
- Capt. and Bt. Major Edward Holt Kendrick, Royal Dublin Fusiliers
- Maj. William Kennedy, East African Veterinary Corps
- Lt. Albert Edmund Kent MC Leicestershire Reg.
- Maj. John Kent, Royal Field Arty.
- Maj. Herbert Edward Kenyon, Royal Garrison Arty.
- Tmp Major John Victor Kershaw, East Lancashire Reg.
- Maj. Sidney Hardinge Kershaw, Northumberland Fusiliers
- Lt. Francis Percy Kindell MC Royal Arty.
- Maj. Charles Harold Kilner, Royal Field Arty.
- Maj. Robert Edgar Kilvert, Royal Marine Arty.
- Tmp Capt. Charles Francis King MC Cheshire Reg.
- Capt. Frank King, 4th Hussars
- Tmp Major John Bussell King, Army Service Corps
- Tmp Major Wentworth Alexander King-Harman (retired) List, late Royal Irish Rifles
- Maj. Guy Thornhill Kingsford, Royal Engineers
- Capt. John Lawson Kinnear MC Liverpool Reg. and Royal Flying Corps
- Tmp Lt.-Col. Lewis Hawker Kirkness, Special List
- Maj. Harry Fearnley Kirkpatrick, East Kent Reg.
- Tmp Major Leonard Knapman, Army Service Corps
- Maj. Charles Leycester Knyvett MC Royal Field Arty.
- Tmp Lt.-Col. Robert Kyle, Highland Light Inf.
- Maj. Wilham Frederick Robert Kyngdon, Royal Garrison Arty.
- Maj. Roderick Laing MC Seaforth Highlanders
- Maj. James Laird, Royal Field Arty.
- Capt. Ronald Dewe Lake, Northamptonshire Reg.
- Tmp Major George Moorsom Lagier Lamotte, Royal Engineers
- Capt. John du Plessis Langrishe RAMC
- Maj. John Henry Langton, Royal Welsh Fusiliers
- Maj. Percy Edward Langworthy Parry, London Reg.
- Maj. Sir Thomas Perceval Larcom Bt Royal Arty.
- Capt. Stanley Dermott Large MC RAMC
- Capt. The Hon. Edward Cecil Lascelles MC Rifles Brigade
- Mag Charles Trevor Lawrence, Royal Field Arty.
- Maj. Geoffrey Lawrence, Royal Field Arty.
- Maj. Hervey Major Lawrence, Scottish Rifles
- Capt. Arthur Bertram Layton, South Lancashire Reg.
- Tmp Major Ralph le Butt, Machine Gun Corps
- Capt. Victor Carmichael Leckie, Royal Army Veterinary Corps
- Maj. Guy Lee MC East Kent Reg.
- Capt. George Maconchy Lee MC Royal Fusiliers
- Maj. Harry Romer Lee, 20th Hussars
- Maj. Edward Frederick William Lees, Royal Engineers
- Maj. Alexander Leggat RAMC
- Capt. Charles Edward Lembcke, Northumberland Fusiliers
- Maj. Frederick Joseph Lemon, West Yorkshire Reg.
- Tmp Major Dudley Lewis MC York & Lancaster Reg.
- Lt.-Col. Philip Edward Lewis, Royal Arty.
- Capt. Wilfrid Gordon Lindsell MC Royal Arty.
- Capt. Christopher George Ling MC Royal Engineers
- Maj. Harold Cronshaw Lings, Manchester Reg.
- Tmp Lt. The Hon. Charles Christopher Josceline Littleton, Middlesex Reg.
- Lt. William Howard Livens MC Royal Engineers
- Maj. Evan Henry Llewellyn, King's African Rifles
- Maj. Evan Colclough Lloyd, Royal Irish Reg.
- Lt. Ormond Maxwell Loggie MC Royal Garrison Arty.
- Tmp Capt. Kenneth Thurston Lomas, Royal Engineers
- Maj. Thomas Longbottom, West Yorkshire Reg.
- Capt. and Bt. Lt.-Col. Charles Alexander Holcombe Longcroft, Welsh Reg.
- Capt. Henry Kerr Longman MC late Gordon Highlanders
- Lt.-Col. William Loring, Royal Garrison Arty.
- 2nd Lt. Stuart Gilkinson Love MC
- Maj. John Gordon Lowndes, late North Lancashire Reg.
- Capt. Henry Charles Loyd MC Coldstream Guards
- Tmp Major Lowes Dalbiac Luard, Army Service Corps
- Maj. Williams Ludgate, Royal Army Veterinary Corps
- Capt. and Bt. Major Edgar Rainey Ludlow-Hewitt MC Royal Irish Rifles
- Maj. Cecil St. John Lynch, Royal Engineers
- Capt. Jasper Beverley Lynch, late 12th Cav., Indian Army
- Local Major Frank Sanderson Lyster, Special List
- Maj. Archibald Laird MacConnell, Argyll and Sutherland Highlanders
- Capt. Harold Symes MacDonald MC Royal Field Arty.
- Tmp Major James Leslie Auld Macdonald, Royal Scots
- Lt.-Col. Reginald James Macdonald, Royal Garrison Arty.
- Maj. John Buchanan MacFarlan, Royal Field Arty.
- Lt. Fane Andrew James Macfarlane, London Reg.
- Maj. Walter Macfarlane, Glasgow Yeomanry
- Capt. Fraoicis Burnett Mackenzie MC Royal Scots
- Maj. Pierse Joseph Mackesy MC Royal Engineers
- Capt. and Bt. Major William Alexander Onslow Churchill Mackintosh, Royal Arty.
- Maj. and Bt. Lt.-Col. Charles Alexander Hugh MacLean, Argyll and Sutherland Highlanders
- Maj. Charles Wilberforce MacLean, Cameron Highlanders
- Tmp Major Adam Gordon MacLeod, Army Service Corps
- Capt. Donald Macleod MC North Staffordshire Reg.
- Maj. Malcolm Neynoe MacLeod MC Royal Engineers
- Lt. Mind en Whyte Melville MacLeod, Royal Garrison Arty.
- Capt. and Bt. Major Patrick Dalmahoy McCandlish, Argyll and Sutherland Highlanders
- Maj. William McCall RAMC
- Maj. Robert Singleton McClintock, Royal Engineers
- Tmp Capt. Ivor Herbert McClure, Intelligence Corps
- Lt. Hamilton McCombie MC Worcestershire Reg.
- Capt. William McKim Herbert McCullagh MC RAMC
- Capt. and Bt. Major James Innis Aikin McDiarmid, Royal Garrison Arty.
- Tmp Capt. Gordon Archibald McLarty RAMC
- Maj. Norman Macdonald McLeod MC Royal Field Arty.
- Capt. Hugh McMaster MC Royal Arty.
- Capt. Donald Jay McMullen, Royal Engineers
- Capt. John William McNee RAMC
- Tmp Capt. George Maitland Edwards, Royal Engineers
- Lt.-Col. George Alexander Malcolm, Reserve, attd. London Reg.
- Tmp Capt. Stuart Sydney Mallinson MC Royal Engineers
- Capt. John Alexander Manifold RAMC
- Capt. Lionel Manton, Royal Engineers
- Maj. and Bt. Lt.-Col. Arthur Henry Marindin, Royal Highlanders
- Maj. and Bt. Lt.-Col. Cecil Colvile Marindin, Royal Garrison Arty.
- Capt. Bryan Lister Marrmer, Royal Field Arty.
- Capt. John Francis Harnsor Marsh, Hampshire Reg.
- Capt. Alfred Russel Marshall MC Royal Engineers
- Capt. Charles Frederick Kelk Marshall MC Royal Field Arty.
- Hon. Major Henry Alfred Marshall, Army Ordnance Depot
- Tmp Major Ernest Brasewhite Martin, Royal Engineers
- Maj. Daniel Johnstone Mason, Royal Field Arty.
- Maj. Malcolm Forty Mason, Suffolk Reg.
- Capt. Charles Walter Massy MC Royal Field Arty.
- Maj. Reginald Cosway Matthews, Royal Army Veterinary Corps
- Tmp Lt.-Col. William Riddell Matthews, RAMC
- Lt. Hugh Patrick Guarm Maule MC Honourable Arty. Company
- Maj. William John Maule, Essex Reg.
- Lt.-Col. Herbert Blair Mayne, Royal Garrison Arty.
- Capt. John Maxwell MC Rifle Brigade
- Lt.-Col. James McCall Maxwell CB Royal Field Arty.
- Tmp Lt.-Col. Robert David Perceval-Maxwell, Royal Irish Rifles
- Maj. Sydmey Manvers Woolner Meadows, RAMC
- Maj. Cyril Frankland Meares, Royal Irish Fusiliers
- Maj. Teignmouth Philip Melvil, Lancers
- Tmp Major David Kinloch Michie, Highland Light Inf.
- Capt. George Waterston Miller, RAMC
- Maj. Hubert Garrett Blair Miller MC Royal Scots Fusiliers
- Rev. William Herbert Latimer Miller Royal Army Chaplains' Dept.
- Maj. John Williamson Milligan, East Africa Supply Corps
- Capt. George Ernest Millner MC London Reg.
- Rev. Eric Milner Milner-White, Royal Army Chaplains' Dept.
- Maj. Cecil Francis Milsom, Army Service Corps
- Tmp Col. Thomas Herbert Minshall, General List
- Maj. Arthur Mitchell, Royal Garrison Arty.
- Maj. Archibald Madame Mitchell, Royal Scots
- Capt. Charles Mitchell, Grenadier Guards
- Capt. William Gore Sutherland Mitchell MC Highland Light Inf.
- Tmp Major Thomas Hassard Montgomery, Army Service Corps
- Maj. Edward Duke Moore, East Riding Yeomanry
- Maj. Edward Henry Milner Moore, RAMC
- Lt.-Col., George Abraham Moore CMG RAMC
- Maj. Charles Robert Faulconer Morgan, Army Service Corps
- Maj. Thomas Bettesworth Moriarty, RAMC
- Lt.-Cmdr. Edward N. Groves Morris, Royal Naval Volunteer Reserve, attd. Royal Naval Air Service
- Maj. Jolm Hugh Morris, Army Service Corps
- Lt.-Col. and Bt. Col. Frederick Lansdowne Morrison CB Highland Light Inf.
- Tmp Capt. Robert Charles Stuart Morrison-Scott, Royal Marine Arty.
- Lt.-Col. Sidney Pelham Morter, Royal Field Arty.
- Tmp Major Albert Isaac Mossop, attd. Oxfordshire & Buckinghamshire Light Inf.
- Lt.-Col. Hugh Crawford Moultrie, Royal Arty.
- Lt.-Col. Charles Carter Moxon CMG Yorkshire Light Inf.
- Tmp Major John Carr Muriel, Royal Inniskilling Fusiliers
- Capt. Edward Lionel Mussor MC Manchester Reg.
- Maj. Lenox Arthur Dutton, Naper, Royal Field Arty.
- Maj. Henry Edmund Palmer-Nash, Royal Scots
- Maj. Roderick Macaulay Bernard Needhan, Suffolk Reg.
- Capt. Duncan Ferguson Dempsterr Neill, Royal Engineers
- Capt. Redmond Barry Neill, Royal Irish Fusiliers
- Lt.-Col. Richard Austin Nevill, Royal Engineers
- Maj. Gervys Charles Nevile, Royal Field Arty.
- Maj.-Thomas Clifford Newbold, Nottinghamshire and Derbyshire Reg.
- Maj. Edward Hills Nicholson, Royal Fusiliers
- Capt. Hugh Blomfield Nicholson, King's Royal Rifle Corps
- Maj. Cecil Paterson Nickalls, Royal Field Arty.
- Maj. John, Scott Nimmo, Royal Army Veterinary Corps
- Maj. Samuel Richard Normand, Royal Garrison Arty.
- Maj. Arthur Ernest Norton, West Indian Reg.
- Tmp Lt.-Col. William Kilminster Notley
- Tmp Major Allan Vaughan Nutt, York & Lancaster Reg.
- Tmp Major Norman Henry Nutt, Tank Corps
- Lt.-Col. William Coope Gates, Nottinghamshire and Derbyshire Reg.
- Tmp Lt.-Col. Henry Rogham O'Brien, Royal Engineers
- Lt.-Col. William Tasker Odam, Royal Field Arty.
- Tmp Major Richard John Lanford O'Donoghue, Army Service Corps
- Tmp Lt.-Col. Robert James Leslie Ogilby, London Reg.
- Maj. David Ogilvy, Royal Engineers
- Tmp Major Bernardine O'Gorman, General List
- Maj. and Bt. Lt.-Col. Gerald Maxwell Orr, Lancers
- Lt.-Col. Lewis James Osborn, Royal Arty., Royal Field Arty.
- Capt. George Cecil Rudall Overton, Royal Fusiliers
- Capt. Lindsay Cunliffe Owen, Royal Engineers
- Tmp Major Norman Henry Oxenham, Machine Gun Corps
- Capt. and Bt. Major Bernard Charles Tolver-Paget MC Oxfordshire & Buckinghamshire Light Inf.
- Rev. Reginald Palmer MC Royal Army Chaplains' Dept.
- Maj. Thomas Kenyon Pardoe, Worcestershire Reg.
- Maj. James Dove Park, Royal Engineers
- Tmp Capt. Albert Chevallier-Parker, Special List
- Capt. George Singleton Parkinson, RAMC
- Maj. Henry Evan Pateshall, Herefordshire Reg.
- Maj. Sir Everard Philip Digby Pauncefort-Duncombe Bt Buckinghamshire Yeomanry
- Maj. Denys Whitmore Payne MC Royal Garrison Arty.
- Tmp Capt. Herbert Gerald Payne, General List
- Maj. Hugh Drummond Pearson, Royal Engineers
- Maj. Thomas William Pearson, Royal Field Arty.
- Lt.-Col. William Carmichael Peebles, Royal Scots
- Capt. Home Peel MC London Reg.
- Local Major Willoughby Ewart Peel, Camel Transport Corps
- Tmp Capt. Albert James Pelling MC Royal Engineers
- Rev. Douglas Raymond Pelly, Royal Army Chaplains' Dept.
- Hon. Lt. Bertie Howard Penn, Army Ordnance Depot
- Lt.-Col. Frederick Septimus Penny CMG RAMC
- Tmp Major William Petty, Seaforth Highlanders
- Capt. Ernest Cyril Phelan MC RAMC
- Lt.-Col. Henry Ramsay Phipps, Royal Field Arty.
- Tmp Major William John Phythian-Adams MC Royal Fusiliers
- Capt. Jocelyn Arthur Adair Pickard, Royal Engineers
- Maj. Frederick Alfred Pile MC Royal Arty.
- Capt. John Ryland Pisent, Royal Engineers
- Maj. and Bt. Lt.-Col. William Richard Pinwill, Liverpool Reg.
- Tmp Major Oswald Bertram Fisher Planck, Army Service Corps
- Lt. Ian Stanley Ord Playfair MC Royal Engineers
- Maj. Thomas Herman Plummer, Royal Garrison Arty.
- Lt. James Frederick Plunkett MC Royal Irish Reg.
- Capt. Alexander Morton Pollard, RAMC
- Capt. Robert Valentine Pollok, Irish Guards
- Maj. and Bt. Lt.-Col. Cyril Lachlan Porter, East Kent Reg.
- Capt. James Herbert Porter, North Staffordshire Reg.
- Maj. Edward Charles Pottinger, Royal Arty.
- Maj. Eden Bernard Powell, Rifles
- Brig Lt.-Col. Edgar Elkin Powell, RAMC
- Tmp Major Randolph MacHattie Powell, Royal Garrison Arty.
- Maj. Thomas Power, M.L.B.
- Maj. Henry Royds Pownall MC Royal Field Arty.
- Tmp Major Albert Ernest Prescott, Royal Engineers
- Maj. Classon O'Driscoll Preston, Royal Field Arty.
- Maj. Walter Clavel Herbert Prichard, Royal Engineers
- Maj. Peregrine Prince, Shropshire Light Inf.
- Tmp Major Edward Robert Seymour Prior MC South Lancashire Reg.
- Lt. Percy William Prockter, Army Service Corps
- Maj. Demson Pudsey, Royal Field Arty.
- Capt. Richard Brownlow Purey-Cust MC Royal Field Arty.
- Maj. Alfred Hutton Radice, Gloucestershire Reg., South Wales Borderers
- Capt. Rowan Scrope Rait Kerr MC Royal Engineers
- Capt. Gerard Marland Rambaut, Royal Field Arty.
- Maj. James Gordon Ramsay, Cameron Highlanders
- Capt. and Bt. Major Algernon Lee Ransome MC Dorsetshire Reg.
- Maj. and Bt. Lt.-Col. Cecil Godfrey Rawling CMG CIE Somerset Light Inf.
- Capt. John George Grey Rea, Yeomanry
- Maj. Robert Clanmalier Reeves, Royal Field Arty.
- Maj. Charles Savile Reid, Royal Engineers
- Lt. Henry Thomas Rendell, Army Service Corps
- Tmp Major John Walter Keyell, Royal Engineers
- Capt. John Phillip Rhodes, Royal Engineers
- Maj. Ernest Evelyn Rich, Royal Horse Arty.
- Tmp Capt. John Frederick Gwyther Richards RAMC
- Maj. Gerald Arthur Richards MC Royal Arty.
- Maj. George Carr Richardson MC Royal Arty.
- Lt.-Col. Robert Buchanan Riddell, Royal Garrison Arty.
- Tmp Major The Hon. Harold Ritchie, Scottish Rifles
- Lt.-Col. Colin McLeod Robertson, Royal Garrison Arty.
- Maj. Frank Mansfield Boileau Robertson, Royal Highlanders
- Maj. William Cairnes Robertson, Royal Garrison Arty.
- Capt. Robert William Barrington Robertson-Eustace, East African Forces
- Maj. Annesley Craven Robinson, Army Service Corps
- Maj. John Armstrong Purefoy Robinson, Royal Garrison Arty.
- Maj. Thomas Chambers Robinson, East Lancashire Reg.
- Maj. Cyril Edmund Alan Spencer Rocke, Irish Guards
- Maj. Harold Bowyer Roffey, Lancashire Fusiliers
- Tmp Major Myles Herbert Roffey, Welsh Reg.
- Maj. Walter Lacy Yea Rogers, Royal Horse Arty.
- Tmp Major Norman Thomas Rolls, Royal West Surrey Reg.
- Maj. and Bt. Lt.-Col. Claudo Stuart Rome, 11th Hussars
- Maj. Everard Howe Rooke, Royal Engineers
- Capt. Edward Ridgill Roper MC Royal Field Arty.
- Capt. Robert Knox Ross MC Royal West Surrey Reg.
- Maj. William Edward Rothwell, Royal Inniskilling Fusiliers
- Maj. Wilfred Barton Rowe, Royal Garrison Arty.
- Lt.-Col. Frank George
- Mathias Rowley CMG Middlesex Reg.
- Lt. Albert Russell, Royal Engineers
- Col. Bruce Bremner Russell
- Maj. Noel Hunsley Campbell Russell, Leinster Reg., and Worcestershire Yeomanry
- Tmp Major William Malcolm Russell, General List
- Maj. William Thomas Cutler Rust, Army Service Corps
- Maj. Hugh Thomas Ryan, Royal Army Veterinary Corps
- Capt. Julian Neil Oscar Rycroft MC Royal Highlanders
- Maj. Harold Francis Salt, Royal Arty.
- Maj. Edward Vipan Sarson, Royal Field Arty.
- Maj. Lionel Robert Schuster, Liverpool Reg.
- Tmp Major Albert Edward Scothern, Nottinghamshire and Derbyshire Reg.
- Capt. John Davie Scott, Royal Irish Reg.
- Capt. John Walter Lennox Scott, RAMC
- Maj. William Scott-Elliot, Army Service Corps
- Maj. Hugh Forde Searight, 1st Dragoon Guards
- Tmp Major Frank Searle, Tank Corps
- Maj. Thomas Byrne Sellar CMG late King's Own Scottish Borderers
- Capt. Hugh Garden Seth-Smith, Army Service Corps
- Capt. Reginald Henry Napier-Settle MC 19th Hussars
- Maj. Evelyn Francis Edward-Seymour, Royal Dublin Fusiliers
- Maj. Roger Cecil Seys, Royal Arty.
- Capt. Arthur Talbot Shakespear MC Royal Engineers
- Capt. and Bt. Major George Frederick Cortland Shakespear MC Indian Army
- Maj. Charles Schmidt Sharpe, York & Lancaster Reg.
- Tmp Major William Shaw, Army Service Corps
- Maj. Henry Francis Shea RAMC
- Capt. Charles Edward Gowran Shearman MC Bedfordshire Reg.
- Tmp Major Robert Austin Shebbeare, Army Service Corps
- Capt. John Reginald Vivian Sherston MC Cav. Indian Army
- Capt. William John Townsend Shorthose, South Staffordshire Reg., and King's African Rifles
- Maj. Cecil Barrow Simonds, Royal Garrison Arty.
- Capt. William ArthurJohn Simpson MC Royal Field Arty.
- Maj. James Robert Simson, Highland Light Inf.
- Rev. Patrick Sinclair Royal Army Chaplains' Dept.
- Maj. Alexander Baird Skinner, Indian Army Cav.
- Q.M. and Hon. Major Edmund William Skinner, Lincolnshire Reg.
- Lt.-Col. Edward Wheeler Slayter CMG RAMC
- Maj. Arthur John Henry Sloggett, Rifle Brigade
- Capt. Lovell Francis Smeathman MC Hertfordshire Reg.
- Capt. Arthur Francis Smith MC Coldstream Guards
- Capt. Isham Percy Smith, Royal Garrison Arty.
- Capt. William Selwyn Smith, Royal Field Arty.
- Maj. Gerald James Watt Smyth, Royal Engineers
- Lt.-Col. Henry Smyth, Cheshire Reg.
- Lt.-Col. George Abraham Smyth, Royal Field Arty.
- Maj. Rupert Caesar Smythe, Royal Inniskilling Fusiliers
- Lt. William Fulton Somervail MC Scottish Rifles
- Capt. Herbert George Sotheby, Argyll and Sutherland Highlanders
- Lt.-Col. Charles Louis Spencer, Royal Engineers
- Capt. Hugh Baird Spens, Scottish Rifles
- Tmp Capt. Alfred William Speyer, General List, late West Yorkshire Reg.
- Capt. Sidney Stallard, London Reg.
- Hon. Capt. Alfred Richard Stamford, Army Ordnance Depot
- Maj. The Hon. Oliver Hugh Stanley, Royal Arty.
- Tmp Major William Alan Stanley, Machine Gun Corps
- Capt. Arthur Christopher Lancelot Stanley-Clarke, Scottish Rifles
- Maj. William Lockhart St. Clair, Royal Field Arty.
- Tmp Major William Jones Steele, Royal Engineers
- Maj. Leigh Pemberton Stedall, Yeomanry
- Tmp Lt.-Col. Arthur Stephenson MC Royal Scots
- Lt.-Col. Henry Kenyon Stephenson Royal Field Arty.
- Capt. Charles Knowles Steward MC South Wales Borderers
- Tmp Major Albert Lewis Stewart, Machine Gun Corps
- Maj. William Murray Stewart, Cameron Highlanders
- Capt. and Bt. Major Walter Robert Stewart MC Rifle Brigade
- Capt. Alexander Dickson Stirling RAMC
- Capt. Colin Robert Hoste Stirling MC Scottish Rifles
- Maj. Walter Andrew Starling MC Royal Arty.
- Maj. William Eustace St. John, Yeomanry
- Maj. Ashton Alexander St. Hill, West Riding Reg.
- Capt. Hugh Morton Stobart, Yeomanry
- Tmp Capt. Adrian Stokes FRCS RAMC
- Cat Henry Howard Stoney, North Staffordshire Reg.
- Maj. Martyn Rogers Strover, Royal Garrison Arty.
- Maj. Edward Lisle Strutt, Royal Scots
- Maj. Francis Cyril Rupert Studd, East Kent Reg.
- Tmp Major Montague Alfred Sliney Sturt, Army Service Corps
- Lt.-Col. Charles William Swinton, Royal Garrison Arty.
- Maj. William Frederick John Symonds, London Reg.
- Tmp Major Henry Leslie Aldersey Swann, Army Service Corps
- Capt. Ernest John Bocart Tagg, Royal Marine Light Inf.
- Tmp 2nd Lt. Bruce Mitchell Taylor MC Duke of Cornwall's Light Inf.
- Maj. Charles Lancaster Taylor, South Wales Borderers
- Maj. Glenleigh John Schill Taylor, Royal Field Arty.
- Capt. George Pritchard Taylor MC RAMC
- Maj. Henry Jeffreys Taylor, Durham Light Inf.
- Capt. George Harris Teall, Lincolnshire Reg.
- Capt. and Bt. Major Richard Durand Temple, Worcestershire Reg.
- Capt. James Hugh Thomas RAMC
- Lt.-Col. Henry Melville Thomas CMG Royal Arty.
- Tmp Major Basil Thomas, Gloucestershire Reg.
- Tmp Lt.-Col. Albert Charles Thompson, Royal Dublin Fusiliers
- Tmp Lt. Claude Ernest Thompson MC South Lancashire Reg.
- Maj. Cyril Henry Farrer Thompson, London Reg.
- Maj. James George Coulthered Thompson, Royal Field Arty.
- Capt. William Irwin Thompson RAMC
- Capt. George Thomson MC Yorkshire Light Inf.
- Maj. George Edward Mervyn Thorneycroft, Royal Arty.
- Maj. Cudbert John Massey Thornhill, Indian Army
- Lt.-Col. Arthur Hugh Thorp, Royal Garrison Arty.
- Lt.-Col. John Claude Thorp, Army Ordnance Depot
- Lt. Alexander Tillett MC Devonshire Reg.
- Maj. Clement Thurstan Tomes MC Royal Warwickshire Reg.
- Capt. Julian Latham Tomlin, Royal Engineers
- Lt.-Col. Francis William Towsey CMG West Yorkshire Reg.
- Maj. Edmund Francis Tarlton Traill, Army Service Corps
- Maj. John Brereton Owst Trimble MC Yorkshire Reg.
- Tmp Major Frederick George Trobridge, General List
- Capt. Gerald Louis Johnson Tuck, Unattd. List, attd. Suffolk Reg.
- Lt.-Col. Donald Fiddes Tulloch, Royal Arty.
- Maj. Canning Turner, Leicestershire Reg.
- Capt. Reginald Aubrey Turner MC Royal Engineers
- Tmp Capt. Clifford Charles Horace Twiss, East Yorkshire Reg.
- Maj. Weratwarth Francis Tyndale CMG RAMC
- Capt. William Tyrrell MC RAMC
- Maj. Thurlo Richardson Ubsdell, late Royal Arty.
- Maj. John Salusbury Unthank, Durham Light Inf.
- Lt. James Alastair Berry Urquhart, Royal Garrison Arty.
- Rev. George Ross Vallings, Royal Army Chaplains' Dept.
- Tmp Capt. Sir Harry Calvert Williams Verney Bt General List
- Maj. Leonard Morris Verney FRCVS Royal Army Veterinary Corps
- Q.M. and Hon. Major George Edward Vickers, Manchester Reg.
- Lt. Oliver G. G. Villiers, Royal Naval Volunteer Reserve, attd. Royal Naval Air Service
- Maj. Patrick Villiers-Stuart, Royal Fusiliers
- Maj. Ernest Blechynden Waggett RAMC
- Lt.-Col. Arthur Reginald Wainewright, Royal Arty.
- Maj. Roland Henry Waithman, Royal Sussex Reg.
- Tmp Capt. George Goold Walker MC Royal Garrison Arty.
- Capt. and Bt. Major Charles John Wallace MC Highland Light Inf.
- Tmp Capt. James Hardress de Warrenne Waller, Royal Engineers
- Maj. Hubert de Lansey Walters, Royal Garrison Arty.
- Maj. Harold Mathias Arthur Ward Royal Garrison Arty.
- Maj. Joseph Ward, RAMC
- Maj. George William Webb Ware RAMC
- Maj. Henry Archibald Waring, Royal West Kent Reg.
- Maj. Lionel Edward Warren, Royal Field Arty.
- Maj. Edward Robert Cabell Warrens, Royal Field Arty.
- Maj. Philip Huskinson Warwick, Yeomanry
- Maj. James Way MC Royal Arty.
- Tmp Major Harry Reginald Bland Wayman, Northumberland Fusiliers
- Maj. Adrian Barclay Wayte, Nottinghamshire and Derbyshire Reg.
- Q.M. and Hon. Major Walter Edward Webb, London Reg.
- Capt. Ronald Moree Weeks MC South Lancashire Reg.
- Maj. Barrington Clement Wells, Essex Reg.
- Capt. Richard Annesley West, Yeomanry
- Lt.-Col. Frederick Malcolm Westropp, Royal Engineers
- Maj. Frederick Whalley RAMC
- Tmp Major Wynn Powell Wheldon, Royal Welsh Fusiliers
- Maj. William Stobart Whetherly, Hussars
- Capt. Arthur Percy Buncombe Whitaker, Army Service Corps
- Charles Richardson White, Army Medical Corps
- Maj. and Bt. Lt.-Col. Frank Augustin Kinder, White, Royal Engineers
- Tmp Lt. Noel Blanco White MC General List
- Maj. and Bt. Lt.-Col. The Hon. Robert White CMG Reserve of Ofc.s
- Lt.-Col. Edmund l'Estrange Whitehead, Royal Arty.
- Tmp Major Hector Fraser Whitehead, East Lancashire Reg.
- Lt.-Col. Edward Nathan Whitley CMG Royal Arty.
- Maj. Everard le Grice Whitting MC Royal Arty.
- Tmp Major Alan Roderick Whittington, Army Service Corps
- Lt. William Henry Whyte, Royal Dublin Fusiliers
- Capt. Harold Hartley Wilberforce, Army Service Corps
- Maj. Edward Harold Wildblood, Leinster Reg.
- Lt. Cyril Francis Wilkins MC Royal Irish Rifles
- Tmp Major Harris Vaughan Wilkinson, Machine Gun Corps
- Capt. James Lugard Willcocks MC Royal Highlanders
- Capt. Henry Beresford Dennitts Willcox MC Nottinghamshire and Derbyshire Reg.
- Maj. George Arthur Seccombe Williams, South Staffordshire Reg. (Spec. Reserve)
- Maj. Herbert Mamwanng Williams, Royal Army Veterinary Corps
- Rev. Ronald Charles Lambert Williams, Royal Army Chaplains' Dept.
- Lt.-Col. Frederick George Willock, Royal Field Arty.
- Maj. Albert Edward Jacob Wilson, Somerset Light Inf.
- Maj. Donald Clitheroe Wilson, Royal Field Arty.
- Tmp Capt. Douglas Hamilton Wilson, General List
- Maj. James Herbert Roche Winder RAMC
- Capt. Gordon Bluett Winch, Royal Field Arty.
- Maj. and Bt. Lt.-Col. Godfrey Harold Fenton Wingate, Royal Scots
- Tmp Lt.-Col. Ernest Arthur Winter MC Royal Fusiliers
- Lt.-Col. William Maunder Withycombe CMG Yorkshire Light Inf.
- Maj. James Wood, RAMC
- Capt. Wilfred James Woodcock, Lancashire Fusiliers
- Capt. William Talbot Woods MC Manchester Reg.
- Maj. Robart James Wordsworth, Nottinghamshire and Derbyshire Reg.
- Maj. Percy Reginald Worrall MC Devonshire Reg.
- Maj. Stephen Henry Worrrall, Border Reg.
- Capt. Andrew Rae Wright RAMC
- Maj. Hubert Howard Wright, Army Service Corps
- Maj. and Bt. Lt.-Col. Wallace Duffield Wright VC CMG Royal West Surrey Reg.
- Maj. William Oswald Wright, Royal Lancaster Reg.
- Lt.-Col. Arthur Oliver Bird Wroughton, RAMC
- Capt. Jasper William George Wyld MC Oxfordshire & Buckinghamshire Light Inf.
- Maj. Guy George Egerton Wylly VC Indian Army
- Tmp Major Charles Sandford Wynne-Eyton, General List, and Royal Flying Corps
- Maj. Cecil McGrigor Yates, Royal Arty.
- Maj. Robert James Burton Yates, Indian Army Cav.
- Maj. Richard Lister York, Royal Field Arty.
- Maj. Arthur Allan Shakespear Younger, Royal Field Arty.
- 2nd Lt. James Allardyce MM London Reg.
- Maj. Arthur Harold Bibby, Royal Field Arty.
- Tmp Capt. Patrick Dick Booth MC Royal Field Arty.
- Capt. and Bt. Major Austin Hanbury Brown MC Royal Engineers
- Lt. Frederick Arthur Montague Browning, Grenadier Guards
- Tmp Capt. Ferguson Fitton Carr-Harris RAMC
- 2nd Lt. Joseph Percy Castle, West Riding Reg.
- Tmp Major Vernon Douglas Robert Conlan, Army Service Corps
- Maj. Anthony Courage MC Hussars
- Maj. Murray Heathneld Dendy MC Royal Arty.
- Lt. Andrew May Duthie, London Reg.
- Lt. William Maurice Evans, South Wales Borderers
- Capt. Charles Robert Gerard, Grenadier Guards
- Capt. Philip Mannock Glasier, London Reg.
- Lt. Tom Goodall, West Riding Reg.
- 2nd Lt. Guthrie Hallsmith, Suffolk Reg.
- Lt. John Steven Hamilton, West Yorkshire Reg.
- Tmp Lt. John Eliot Hancock, Norfolk Reg.
- Capt. James Francis Harter MC Royal Fusiliers
- Lt. Cyril Walter Holcroft, Worcestershire Reg.
- Capt. Herbert Selwyn Jackson, West Riding Reg.
- Tmp 2nd Lt. William George James, Yorkshire Light Inf.
- 2nd Lt. William Joffe, Yorkshire Light Inf.
- Capt. Kenneth Alfred Johnston, Hampshire Reg.
- 2nd Lt. Edward Spurin Knight, London Reg.
- Tmp Capt. Charles Robert Lucas, Royal Lancaster Reg.
- Lt. Alfred Cecil Lynn, Yorkshire Light Inf.
- 2nd Lt. John Francis Maginn, London Reg.
- Tmp Capt. Francis Morgan Mathias, Welsh Reg.
- 2nd Lt. James Thomas Byford McCudden MC General List, and Royal Flying Corps
- 2nd Lt. Andrew Edward McKeever MC Royal Flying Corps
- Tmp Major David Watts Morgan, Labour Corps
- Capt. and Bt. Major The Hon. Thomas George
- Breadalbane TVtorgan-Grenville-Gavin MC Rifle Brigade
- Lt. Charles Stone Moxon, West Riding Reg.
- Maj. Sir Christopher William Nixon Bt Royal Arty.
- 2nd Lt. James Partridge Notman, Seaforth Highlanders
- 2nd Lt. Gerald O'Brien, Royal Munster Fusiliers
- Maj. Cecil Henry Pank, Middlesex Reg.
- 2nd Lt. William Paul MC West Yorkshire Reg.
- 2nd Lt. James Peel MM Royal Fusiliers
- Maj. Gilbert Sandford Poole, Yeomanry
- Maj. Rowland Edward Power, East Kent Reg.
- Tmp Major John Brenchley Rosher MC Durham Light Inf.
- Maj. Charles Frank Rundall, Royal Engineers
- Lt.-Col. George Gray Russell, King Edward's Horse
- Lt.-Col. Cecil John Herbert Spence-Jones, Yeomanry
- Maj. Charles Arthur Algernon Stidson RAMC
- Capt. and Bt. Major John Alexander Stirling MC Scots Guards
- Tmp Major Leycester Penrhyn Storr, Liverpool Reg.
- Lt. Gerald Fitzgerald-Stuart, West Yorkshire Reg.
- Tmp 2nd Lt. John Edwin Tillotson, West Yorkshire Reg.
- 2nd Lt. Elliot Clarke Tuckey, Royal Field Arty.
- Tmp 2nd Lt. William Arthur Upton, Wiltshire Reg.
- Tmp Lt.-Col. Herbert Lawton Warden, East Surrey Reg.
- Lt. Guy Randolph Westmacott, Grenadier Guards
- Capt. and Bt. Major Bevil Thomson Wilson, Royal Engineers

==== Australian Imperial Force ====
- Maj. Alan Sinclair Durvall Barton, Army Medical Corps
- Maj. Thomas Harold Bird, Light Horse Reg.
- Lt.-Col. Jaanes Jamison Black, Army Medical Corps
- Lt.-Col. William Brazenor, Inf.
- Maj. William Francis Noel Bridges, Inf.
- Lt.-Col. Samuel Roy Burston, Army Medical Corps
- Maj. David Duncan Jade, Army Medical Corps
- Lt.-Col. Herbert Gordon Carter, Pioneer Battalion
- Maj. Richard Gardiner Casey MC Inf.
- Maj. Clement Lorne Chapman, Army Medical Corps
- Maj. Alexander Chisholm, Light Horse Reg.
- Maj. Walter Churchus, Field Arty.
- Maj. Eric Winfield Connelly, Inf.
- Tmp Lt.-Col. James Montague Christian Corlette, Engineers
- Maj. John Joseph Corngan, Inf.
- Maj. Tannatt William Edgeworth David CMG Engineers
- Lt.-Col. William Joihn Stevens Davidson, Field Arty.
- Lt.-Col. Michael Henry Downey, Army Medical Corps
- Lt.-Col. Richard Dowse, Staff
- Lt.-Col. Edmund Alfred Drake Broekman CMG Inf.
- Lt.-Col. Bernard Oscar Charles Duggan, Inf.
- Maj. Percy Malcolm Edwards, Field Arty.
- Maj. William Gordon Farquhar, Engineers
- Maj. Hubert Cedric Ford, Inf.
- Maj. William Reginald Rogers Ffrench MC Machine Gun Corps
- Maj. Vivian Harold Gatliff, Field Arty.
- Maj. Richard Stewart Gee, Field Arty.
- Capt. Henry James Hill Glover, Field Arty.
- Lt.-Col. Henry Arthur Goddard, Inf.
- Maj. John Leslie Hardie, General List
- Maj. James Douglas Henry, Engineers
- Lt.-Col. Ernest Edward Herrod, Inf.
- Lt.-Col. William Alexander Henderson, Pioneer Battalion
- Maj. Max Henry, Royal Army Veterinary Corps
- Maj. Basil Holmes, Inf.
- Col. Alexander Jobson, Inf.
- Maj. Robert Kerr, Provost Company
- Maj. William Selwyn King, Army Service Corps
- Lt.-Col. Giffard Hamilton Macarthur King CMG Field Arty.
- Maj. Robert Edward Jackson, Inf.
- Lt.-Col. John Dudley Lavarack, Arty.
- Maj. Frederick Washington Lawson, Engineers
- Lt.-Col. Henry Dundas Keith Macartney, Field Arty.
- Maj. Patrick John McCormack, Field Arty.
- Maj. Roy Stanley McGregor, Army Medical Corps
- Maj. Louis Evander McKenzie, Royal Army Veterinary Corps
- Q.M. and Hon. Major Charles Francis Minagall, Inf.
- Lt.-Col. John Wesley Mitchell, Inf.
- Maj. David Henry Moore, Field Arty.
- Lt.-Col. Arthur Henry Moseley, Army Medical Corps
- Maj. Edric Noel Mulligan, Australian Engineers
- Lt.-Col. Henry Simpson Newland, Army Medical Corps
- Lt.-Col. Edward Creer Nome, Inf.
- Maj. Edwin Andrew Olding, Field Arty.
- Maj. John Joseph Power, Army Medical Corps
- Lt.-Col. Edgar Maurice Ralph, General List
- Lt.-Col. George Arthur Read, Inf.
- Maj. John Dalyell Richardson, Light Horse Reg.
- Maj. Harold William Riggall, Field Arty.
- Maj. Septimus Godorphin Rowe, Field Arty.
- Maj. Edward Irvine Charles Scott, Pioneer Battalion
- Maj. Herbert James Shannon, Light Horse Reg.
- Lt.-Col. Joseph Lexden Shellshear, Field Artv
- Lt.-Col. James Charles Francis Slane, Inf.
- Maj. Dudley Wallace Arabin Smith, Light Horse Reg.
- Maj. William Smith, Provost Corps
- Lt.-Col. William Stansfield, Army Service Corps
- Lt.-Col. John Mitchell Young Stewart, Army Medical Corps
- Maj. Harold Bourne Taylor, Field Arty.
- Lt.-Col. Alexander Hopkins Thwaites, Army Medical Service
- Maj. Claude John Tozer, Army Medical Corps
- Lt.-Col. Hugh Venables Vernon, Field Arty.
- Tmp Lt.-Col. Charles Ernest Wassell, Army Medical Corps
- Lt.-Col. Ernest Morgan Williams, Light Horse Reg.
- Maj. Henry James Williams, Army Medical Corps
- Maj. Eric Arundel Wilton, Machine Gun Corps
- Lt.-Col. Percy William Woods MC Inf.
- Lt.-Col. Arthur Raff Woolcock, Inf.
- Maj. Malwyn Hayley à Beckett, Inf.
- Lt.-Col. Murray William James Bourchier, Light Horse Reg.
- Tmp Lt.-Col. Donald Cameron, Light Horse Reg.
- Capt. George Vernon Davies, Army Medical Corps
- Capt. Robert Derwent Dixon, Australian Inf.
- Maj. Cuthbert Murchison Fetherstonhaugh, Light Horse Reg.
- Maj. Reginald Norris Franklin, Light Horse Reg.
- Lt.-Col. Robert Oswald Henderson, Inf.
- Maj. Eric Montague Hyman, Light Horse Reg.
- Maj. James Lawson, Light Horse Reg.
- Maj. Leslie Herbert Payne, Inf.
- Maj. Jeremiah Charles Selmes, Field Arty.
- Maj. Roy Meldrum Thompson MC Field Arty.

==== Canadian Force ====
- Capt. Samuel Buttrey Birds MC Inf.
- Lt.-Col. Allison Hart Borden, Inf.
- Maj. Alexander Grant, Inf.
- Maj. John Alexander McEwan, Inf.
- Lt.-Col. Andrew George Latta McNaughton, Field Arty.
- Maj. Frederick Jackson Alderson, Field Arty.
- Lt.-Col. Carleton Woodford Allen, Pioneer Battalion
- Maj. Alexander Alderson Anderson, Engineers
- Maj. Thomas Victor Anderson, Engineers
- Maj. Alfred Turner Bazin, Army Medical Corps
- Maj. Percy George Bell, Army Medical Corps
- Maj. Charles Corbishley Bennett, Inf.
- Maj. Robert Bickerdike, Inf.
- Maj. Alfred Sidney Buttenshaw, Ordnance Company
- Lt.-Col. Glen Campbell, Pioneer Battalion
- Lt.-Col. Robert Percy Clark MC Inf.
- Lt.-Col. Frederick Fieldhouse Clarke, Railway Troops
- Maj. George Alton Cline, Engineers
- Maj. Frederick Thomas Coghlan, Field Arty.
- Lt.-Col. James Kennedy Cornwall, Railway Troops
- Maj. Ian Laurie Crawford, Inf.
- Lt.-Col. James Edgar Davey, Army Medical Corps
- Lt.-Col. Charles Harold Dickson, Army Medical Corps
- Maj. Robert Loggie Masterson Donaldson, Ordnance Company
- Lt.-Col. John Badenoch Donnelly, Forestry Company
- Lt.-Col. William Henry Pferinger Elkins, Horse Arty.
- Maj. Thomas Francis Elmitt, Inf.
- Tmp Major Royal Lindsay Hamilton Ewing MC Inf.
- Maj. James Johnston Fraser, Army Medical Corps
- Maj. Thomas Gibson, Labour Battalion
- Maj. Edward Crosby Goldie, Army Service Corps
- Lt.-Col. Atholl Edwin Griffin, Railway Troops
- Tmp Major The Hon. Francis Egerton Grosvenor MC Inf.
- Lt.-Col. Edwin Gerald Hanson, Field Arty.
- Maj. Edward Montgomery Harris, Army Service Corps
- Lt.-Col. William Henry Harrison, Field Arty.
- Maj. Harry Cecil Hatch, Inf.
- Maj. Halfdan Fenton Harboe Hertzberg MC Engineers
- Lt.-Col. Chilion Longley Hervey, Railway Troops
- Lt.-Col. Charles Rapelje Hill, Inf.
- Maj. Walter Court Hyde, Field Arty.
- Lt.-Col. George Chalmers Johnston MC Mounted Rifles
- Maj. George Knight Killam, Inf.
- Maj. Charles Ernest King, Inf.
- Tmp Lt.-Col. Thomas McCrae Leask, Army Medical Corps
- Lt.-Col. William Bethune Lindsay CMG Engineers
- Maj. Edison Franklin Lynn MC Engineers
- Maj. William Broder McTaggart, Field Arty.
- Maj. Donald John Macdonald MC Cav.
- Lt.-Col. James Brodie Lauder Macdonald, Railway Troops
- Maj. Frederick Thomas McKean, Army Service Corps
- Capt. William Gordon MacKendrick, Engineers
- Maj. James Frederick McParland, Field Arty.
- Lt. Charles Kirwan Craufurd Martin, Field Arty.
- Lt.-Col. Lawrence Thomas Martin, Railway Troops
- Maj. Robert Frank Massie, Field Arty.
- Lt. Arthur Clinton Maund, Inf. and Royal Flying Corps
- Lt.-Col. Lionel Herbert Millen, Inf.
- Lt. Frederick Frank Minchin MC Inf., attd. Royal Flying Corps
- Maj. Percival John Montague MC Inf.
- Lt.-Col. Walter Hill Moodie, Railway Troops
- Maj. John Aubrey Morphy, Pioneer Battalion
- Maj. George Sidney Mothersill, Army Medical Corps
- Lt.-Col. Thomas Joseph Francis Murphy, Army Medical Corps
- Tmp Capt. Robert Henry Neeland, Labour Company
- Maj. Daniel Jerome O'Donahoe, Inf.
- Capt. Garnet Lehrle Ord, Pioneer Battalion
- Maj. Richard Francis Parkinson, Inf.
- Maj. Eric Pepler, Engineers
- Lt.-Col. Charles Ayre Peters, Army Medical Corps
- Capt. John Downey Pitman, Ordnance Company
- Maj. Alan Torrence Powell, Inf.
- Lt. Kenneth Alan Ramsay, Railway Troops
- Maj. James Sabiston Rankin, Inf.
- Maj. Clifford Hamilton Reason, Army Medical Corps
- Maj. William Roy Reirdon, Field Arty.
- Lt.-Col. Blair Ripley, Railway Troops
- Maj. Donald Edward Allan Rispin, Inf.
- Maj. Robert Percy Rogers, Engineers
- Lt.-Col. James Sclater, Inf.
- Capt. Morris Alexander Scott, Machine Gun Corps
- Lt.-Col. Samuel Simpson Sharpe, Inf.
- Maj. John Ham Sills, Inf.
- Maj. Henry Denne St. Alban Smith, Engineers
- Capt. Richard Winslow Stayner MC Mounted Rifles
- Maj. Henry Arthur Stewart, Army Service Corps
- Maj. Cecil Valentine Stockwell, Field Arty.
- Maj. Joseph Murray Syer, Field Arty.
- Capt. David Sobey Tamblyn, Royal Army Veterinary Corps
- Maj. Harold Lyndridge Trotter, Engineers
- Tmp Col. John Burton White, Forestry Corps
- Hon. Lt.-Col. Rev. Albert William Woods, Royal Army Chaplains' Dept.
- Maj. Gordon Harold Aikins, Mounted Rifles
- Lt. Walter Hartley Burgess, Inf.
- Lt. John Angus Cameron, Inf.
- Lt. William Francis Jamieson, Inf.
- Lt. Hector Kennedy, Inf.
- Maj. William Thewles Lawless, Inf.
- Lt. Ronald Frederick Macnaghten, Inf.
- Capt. Ronald Wilfred Pearson MC Inf.
- Maj. Harold Murchinson Savage, Field Arty.
- Capt. William Keating Walker MC Machine Gun Corps
- Maj. William Douglas Wilson, Field Arty.
- Tmp Capt. Harvey Gordon Young, Canadian Army Medical Corps
- Tmp Capt. Archibald Stirling Kennedy Anderson MC RAMC
- Capt. Rupert Henry Anderson-Morshead, Devonshire Reg.
- Lt.-Col. Duncan Gus Baillie, Yeomanry
- Maj. Walter Agar Thomas Barstow MC Royal Field Arty.
- Maj. Richard Maul Birkett, Royal Sussex Reg., attd. Royal West Surrey Reg.
- Tmp Capt. James Thornely Bowman RAMC
- Capt. Henry Fergusson Brace, Hussars
- Tmp Capt. John Edouard Marsdeu Bromley, Royal Field Arty.
- Tmp Capt. John Jackson Cameron, South Staffordshire Reg., attd. Royal Lancaster Reg.
- Maj. James Francis Fraser-Tytler, Yeomanry, attd. Cameron Highlanders
- Tmp Capt. Howard Boyd Graham RAMC
- 2nd Lt. Charles Ernest Henderson, London Reg.
- Capt. and Bt. Major Henry Francis
- Leonard Hilton-Green MC Gloucestershire Reg., attd. A.C. Corps
- Lt. Percy Frank Knightley, Royal Welsh Fusiliers
- Capt. Arthur McDougall, Yeomanry
- Lt. Herbert Dryden Home Yorke Nepean, Indian Army
- Maj. John Gordon Rees, Yeomanry, attd. Royal Welsh Fusiliers
- Capt. Robert Thin Craig Robertson RAMC
- Capt. Richard Adair Rochfort MC Royal Warwickshire Reg., attd. Royal Berkshire Reg.
- Capt. Alan Patrick Rodgerson, Indian Army
- Maj. Gerald Gane Thatcher, Royal Garrison Arty., attd. Royal Field Arty.
- Capt. and Bt. Major Gerald Lawrence Uniacke, Royal Lancaster Reg.

==== Newfoundland Force ====
- Capt. Bertram Butler MC Newfoundland Reg.

==== New Zealand Force ====
- Lt.-Col. Stephen Shepherd Allen, Inf.
- Maj. Frederick Cameron New Zealand Medical Corps
- Lt.-Col. Alexander Burnet Charters CMG Inf.
- Maj. William Oliver Ennis, Pioneers
- Maj. David John Gibbs, Engineers
- Maj. Halbert Cecil Glendining, Field Arty
- Maj. Edward James Hulbert, Mounted Rifles
- Lt.-Col. James Neil McCarroll, Mounted Rifles
- Maj. John McCare, Inf.
- Lt.-Col. George Mitchell, Inf.
- Maj. Donald Sinclair Murchison, Mounted Rifles
- Maj. Clarence Nathaniel Newman, Field Arty.
- Lt.-Col. Charles Treweck Hand-Newton FRCS New Zealand Medical Corps
- Maj. Edward Puttick, Rifle Brigade
- Tmp Major Harry McKellar White Richardson MC Rifle Brigade
- Maj. James Macdonald Richmond MC Field Arty.
- Lt.-Col. Robert Amos Row, Inf.
- Maj. James Stafford, New Zealand Veterinary Corps
- Maj. Alan Duncan Stitt MC Inf.
- Maj. Hugh Vickerman, Engineers
- Lt.-Col. Claude Horace Weston, Inf.

==== South African Force ====
- Tmp Major Charles Agnew Anderson, South African Water Supply Corps
- Tmp Major Thomas William Armitage, South African Service Corps
- Tmp Major George Edwin Brink, South African Force
- Maj. Peter Skinner Clarke, South African Medical Corps
- Tmp Lt.-Col. Thomas Harry Blew, Heavy Arty.
- Lt.-Col. Ewan Christian, Inf.
- Tmp Lt.-Col. Francis Richard Collins, Engineers
- Maj. Fred Haselden, Inf.
- Maj. Theophilus Edward Liefeldt, Native Labour Corps
- Maj. John James Mulvey, Pioneer Battalion
- Tmp Capt. Hugh Brindley Owen Uganda Medical Service
- Brig.-Gen.-General William Ernest Collins Tanner CMG Inf.
- Maj. David Morris Tomory, South African Medical Corps
- Capt. Charles Frederick Bernard Viney, Mounted Rifles
- Lt.-Col. Arthur Blackwood Ward South African Medical Corps
- Tmp Lt.-Col. Gilbert Neville Williams, South African Forces

==== Awarded a Bar to the Distinguished Service Order (DSO*) ====
- Cmdr. William Marshall DSO RD Royal Naval Reserve
- Maj. William Nathaniel Stuart Alexander DSO Connaught Rangers
- Capt. and Bt. Major Michael George Henry Barker DSO Lincolnshire Reg.
- Maj. Thomas Andrew Dunlop Best DSO Royal Inniskilling Fusiliers
- Capt. and Bt. Major John Dopping Boyd DSO Royal West Surrey Reg.
- Lt. Charles Henry Dowden DSO MC King's Royal Rifle Corps
- Maj. Archibald Jenner Ellis DSO Border Reg.
- Maj. and Bt. Lt.-Col. Henry Gaspard de Lavalette Ferguson DSO attd. Norfolk Reg.
- Maj. Marmion Carr Ferrers-Guy DSO Lancashire Fusiliers
- Maj. Ronald Foster Forbes DSO Highland Light Inf.
- Maj. and Bt. Lt.-Col. Sidney Goodall Francis DSO West Yorkshire Reg.
- Lt.-Col. John Malise Anne Graham DSO Royal Lancaster Reg.
- Maj. William Green DSO Royal Highlanders
- Tmp Capt. James Robertson Campbell Greenlees DSO RAMC
- Capt. Cecil Champagne Herbert-Stepney DSO King's Royal Rifle Corps
- Maj. and Bt. Lt.-Col. Charles Graeme Higgins DSO Oxfordshire & Buckinghamshire Light Inf.
- Maj. Clifford Hill DSO East African Mounted Rifles
- Maj. and Bt. Lt.-Col. Sir Thomas Dare Jackson Bt MVO DSO Royal Lancaster Reg.
- Capt. and Bt. Major Alexander Colin Johnston DSO MC Worcestershire Reg.
- Maj. and Bt. Lt.-Col. Alexander Fraser Campbell Maclachlan DSO King's Royal Rifle Corps
- Maj. Samuel McDonald DSO Gordon Highlanders
- Maj. Reginald George Maturin DSO Royal Field Arty.
- Maj. Arthur Maxwell DSO London Reg.
- Maj. Herbert Milward Milward DSO Nottinghamshire and Derbyshire Reg.
- Maj. Noel Ernest Money DSO Shropshire Yeomanry
- Maj. Hubert Horatio Shirley Morant DSO Durham Light Inf.
- Lt.-Col. Ronald Ernest Murray DSO British South Africa Police
- Tmp Major Sholto Stuart Ogilvie DSO Wiltshire Reg.
- Maj. George Parsons DSO British South Africa Police
- Tmp Lt.-Col. Warren John Peacocke DSO Royal Inniskilling Fusiliers
- Maj. William Moore Bell Sparkes DSO RAMC
- Capt. and Bt. Major Gerald Lawrence Uniacke DSO Royal Lancaster Reg., and 2nd Nigeria Reg.
- Capt. Lancelot Edward Seth Ward DSO late Oxfordshire & Buckinghamshire Light Inf.
- Maj. and Bt. Lt.-Col. Donald Munro Watt DSO Gurkha Rifles, Indian Army
- Capt. and Bt. Major Bertram Charles Maximilian Western DSO East Lancashire Reg.
- Maj. Stuart Lumley Whatford DSO Yorkshire Reg.
- Maj. Thomas Edmund Palmer Wickham DSO Royal Arty.
- Capt. Frank Worthington DSO RAMC
- Maj. Kenneth Duncan DSO Royal Field Arty.
- Maj. George Scott Jackson DSO Northumberland Fusiliers
- Tmp Surgeon William James McCracken DSO MC RN
- Maj. Horace Somerville Sewell DSO Dragoon Guards
- Maj. Baptist Johnson Barton DSO Yorkshire Light Inf.
- Lt.-Col. Guy Archibald Hastings Beatty DSO Indian Cav.
- Maj. Alfred Morey Boyall DSO West Yorkshire Reg.
- Maj. Hugh Annesley Gray-Cheape DSO Yeomanry
- Maj. John Hardress-Lloyd DSO Tank Corps
- Capt. Charles Hervey Hoare DSO Yeomanry
- Capt. Edward Darby Jackson DSO King's Own Scottish Borderers
- Tmp Major Charles Kennett James DSO Border Reg.
- Maj. George Knowles DSO Indian Cav.
- Arthur Campden Little DSO Hussars
- Maj. Arthur Mordaunt Mills DSO Indian Cav.
- Maj. Arthur Carr Osburn DSO RAMC
- Lt. James Frederick Plunkett DSO MC DCM Royal Irish Reg.
- Capt. Geoffrey Taunton Raikes DSO South Wales Borderers

===== Australian Imperial Force =====
- Lt.-Col. William Grant DSO Australian Light Horse
- Lt.-Col. Thomas John Todd DSO Light Horse Reg.
- Lt.-Col. Reginald John Albert Travers DSO Inf.

===== Canadian Force =====
- Lt.-Col. Denis Colburn Draper DSO Mounted Rifles Battalion
- Lt.-Col. John Mervyn Prower DSO Inf.
- Lt.-Col. John Munro Ross DSO Inf.
- Maj. Lawrence Vincent Moore Cosgrave DSO Canadian Arty.
- Lt.-Col. William Wasbrough Foster DSO Canadian Inf.
- Maj. George Waters MacLeod DSO Canadian Inf.
- Maj. Hugh Wilderspin Niven DSO MC Canadian Inf.

===== New Zealand Force =====
- Lt.-Col. George Augustus King DSO Canterbury Reg.
- Lt.-Col. Hugh Stewart DSO Canterbury Reg.
- Lt. Col. James Henry Whyte DSO Wellington Mounted Rifles

==== Awarded a Second Bar to the Distinguished Service Order (DSO**) ====
- Tmp Lt.-Cmdr. Arthur Holland Asquith DSO* Royal Naval Volunteer Reserve

=== Distinguished Conduct Medal (DCM) ===
- C.S. Maj. S. Aberdeen, Durham Light Inf. (Durham)
- C.S. Maj. D. Adair, East Yorkshire Reg. (Durham)
- Sgt. A. L. Adams, Royal Engineers (Edinburgh)
- Sgt. J. H. Adams, Royal Engineers (Brislington)
- Sgt. J. Adamson, Yorkshire Reg. (East Ramton)
- Dvr. H. F. Addington, Royal Field Arty. (Church Brampton, Northampton)
- C.S. Maj. W. H. Albutt, Royal Welsh Fusiliers (Sparkbrook)
- Sgt. F. G. Aldridge, Royal Engineers (Evesham, Worcester)
- Petty Ofc. J. Allan, Royal Naval Volunteer Reserve (Annitsford)
- Cpl. A. Allen, Royal Garrison Arty. (Belfast)
- C.S. Maj. W. T. Alloway, Oxfordshire & Buckinghamshire Light Inf. (Marlow)
- Pte. C. Andrews, Royal West Kent Reg. (Poplar, London)
- Sgt. A. H. Annear, Royal Garrison Arty. (Plymouth, Devon)
- Sgt. C. F. Ash, Royal Garrison Arty. (Chatham)
- L. Cpl. H. P. Ashton, Royal Engineers (Moorhurst, Hamps.)
- Sgt. W. Askew, King's Royal Rifle Corps (Kenilworth)
- Gnr. C. H. G. Anthony, Royal Field Arty. (Aston, Birmingham)
- C.Q.M.S. A. J. Appleby, Royal Engineers (Clapton Park)
- Sgt. W. J. Avis, Machine Gun Corps (Lewes)
- L. Cpl. J. F. Bagshaw, Royal Warwickshire Reg. (Walsall)
- Cpl. G. Bailey, Royal Field Arty. (Bristol)
- Sgt. F. J. Baker, Royal Field Arty. (Wdlworth)
- C.S. Maj. H. T. Baldwin, Hampshire Reg. (Wimbledon, London)
- Battery Sergeant Major J. H. Barlow, Royal Field Arty. (Woolwich)
- Battery Sergeant Major J. Barnes, Royal Field Arty. (Ramsey, Huntingdon)
- Pte. S. Barnes, Manchester Reg. (Oldham)
- C.S. Maj. J. Barraclough, Yorkshire Light Inf. (Wakefield)
- Capt. J. C. S. Barron, Royal Engineers (North Shields)
- Act. C.S. Maj. J. Bartlett, Royal Sussex Reg. (Eastbourne)
- Sgt. H. Barton, Royal Irish Fusiliers (Jerrettspas, Newry)
- Cpl. J. S. Bastick, Norfolk Reg. (Bethnal Green, London)
- Gnr. S. Bate, Royal Field Arty. (Hartlepool)
- Sgt. J. Bates, Royal Inniskilling Fusiliers (Liemaskea, County Fermanagh)
- Bombr. A. H. Baylis, Royal Field Arty. (Worcester)
- C.S. Maj. J. Beaton, Scottish Rifles (Balmain, N.S.W.)
- Pte. I. Beaty, Royal Scots (Manchester)
- Sgt. W. Bee, Manchester Reg. (Harlesden, London)
- Pte. J. Bell, West Riding Reg. (Greenfield)
- Act. R.S. Maj. G. F. Bennett, Tank Ops (Leicester)
- Pte. W. Bennett, Manchester Reg. (Handforth, Cheshire)
- L. Sgt. M. Berkley, Cheshire Reg. (Hirst Ashington, Northumberland)
- Sgt. J. Berwick, Border Reg. (Workingdon)
- L. Sgt. A. Bickerstaffe, South Lancashire Reg. (St. Helens)
- Cpl. F. Birch, Leicestershire Reg. (Hinckley, Leics.)
- Gnr. E. Blackwood, Royal Garrison Arty. (Coatbridge)
- C.Q.M.S. C. J. Bland, Middlesex Reg. (Upper Holloway, London)
- Battery Sergeant Major A. J. Blowers, Royal Field Arty. (Lowestoft)
- Battery Sergeant Major J. Blundell, Royal Garrison Arty. (Cork)
- Bombr. H. Blythe, Royal Field Arty. (Mansfield, Notts)
- Act. Bombr. S. A. Blythe, Royal Garrison Arty. (Melton, Norfolk)
- Sgt. H. Bottomley, RAMC (Colchester)
- Battery Sergeant Major J. T. Boughen, Royal Field Arty. (Netley)
- Sgt. F. Bowcock, Royal Field Arty. (Leek, Staffs.)
- 2nd Cpl. F. Bownasa, Royal Engineers (E. Bradford)
- Sgt. C. H. Boyle, Royal Garrison Arty. (Kingston Hill, Surrey)
- L. Sgt. G. T. Boynes, North Lancashire Reg. (Preston)
- Sgt. J. Bracegirdle, Royal Garrison Arty. (Carnarvon)
- Sgt. S. Bradshaw, Manchester Reg. (Manchester)
- Cpl. S. G. Brain, Royal Warwickshire Reg. (Banbury)
- C.S. Maj. E. Brake, Somerset Light Inf. (Bath)
- Gnr. W. Breakey, Tank Corps. (Edinburgh)
- Sgt. H. G. Bridges, Royal Horse Arty. (St. Leonards-on-Sea)
- C.S. Maj. E. J. Briffet, Royal Engineers (Bristol)
- Act. Staff Sergeant A. Briggs, Army Ordnance Corps (Walworth)
- Sgt. B. Briggs, Labour Corps. (Kennington Park, London)
- Cpl. F. Briggs, North Lancashire Reg. (Bolton)
- Cpl. of Horse W. H. E. Briton, Dragoon Guards (Hereford)
- Cpl. A. T. Brooker, Royal Horse Arty.
- Battery Sergeant Major F. A. Broomfield, Royal Field Arty. (Stratford, London)
- C.S. Maj. A. Broomhead, Nottinghamshire and Derbyshire Reg. (Derby)
- C.S. Maj. G. Browell, Northumberland Fusiliers (Newcastle)
- Sgt. A. (Brown, York & Lancaster Reg. (Thurnscoe, near Barnsley)
- Sgt. A. Brown, Royal Field Arty. (Padiham, Lancaster)
- Sgt. J. Brown, Royal Engineers (Mulrkirk)
- C.S. Maj. G. Brown, Norfolk Reg. (Thixendale, Malton, Yorkshire)
- Cpl. G. D. Brown, King's Royal Rifle Corps (Newton, Yorkshire)
- Cpl. W. Brunton, Royal Garrison Arty. (Edinburgh)
- C.S. Maj. R. H. Bryan, Royal Warwickshire Reg. (Coventry)
- Sgt. F. C. Bryson, Royal Garrison Arty. (Temple Ewell)
- C.S. Maj. J. F. Buchanan, Gordon Highlanders (Aberdeen)
- Sgt. E. Bullock, Machine Gun Corps (Broseley)
- L. Cpl. L. J. Burden, Tank Corps. (Bridgtown)
- Cpl. A. Burnett, Royal Field Arty. (Preston)
- C.S. Maj. W. Burndge, Royal Welsh Fusiliers (Swansea)
- Cpl. H. Burrows, Royal Garrison Arty. (North Waisliam)
- Sgt. W. Burrows, Royal Field Arty. (Forest Gate)
- Sgt. W. C. Burton, Royal Engineers (Hackney)
- Cpl. A. C. Caiger, Oxfordshire & Buckinghamshire Light Inf. (Malvern)
- Sgt. J. Cairney, Royal Engineers (Glasgow)
- C.S. Maj. A. W. Calder, Seaforth Highlanders (Carr Bridge)
- Far. Sergeant W. W. Canham, Royal Field Arty. (Kilkenny)
- B.Q.M. Sgt. T. W. Carefoot, East Lancashire Reg. (Burnley)
- Battery Sergeant Major J. Carlyle, Royal Field Arty. (Manchester)
- Sgt. J. Carmichael, King's Own Scottish Borderers (Chorlton-cum-Hardy)
- C.Q.M.S. W. H. Carnie, Welsh Reg. (Cardiff)
- Sgt. J. Cassidy, West Yorkshire Reg. (Lincoln)
- L. Sgt. L. Chalk, Northamptonshire Reg. (Abbot Langley)
- Pte. E. Chambers, North Staffordshire Reg. (Cambefley, Surrey)
- C.S. Maj. J. Chance, Worcestershire Reg. (Ryde, Isle of Wight)
- C.S. Maj. G. Chandler, Leicestershire Reg. (Cheadle, Staffs.)
- Sgt. T. Chapman, Lincolnshire Reg. (Hognaby, Spilsby)
- Battery Sergeant Major G. Chappell, Royal Field Arty. (E. London)
- Pte. H. Charlton, Nottinghamshire and Derbyshire Reg. (Awsworth)
- Sgt. J. C. Charlton, Yorkshire Reg. (Middlesbrough)
- C.Q.M.S. J. E. Cherry, East Lancashire Reg. (Colne)
- L. Cpl. A. Chesters, Royal Lancaster Reg. (E. Lancaster)
- Sgt. E. Chidgey, Royal Engineers (North Petherton)
  - Far. Q.M.S. W. A. Chmery, Royal Horse Arty. (Frimley, Surrey)
- B.Q.M. Sgt. W. H. Christy, Manchester Reg. (Wigan)
- Sgt. W. Chrystall, Royal Field Arty. (Aberdeen)
- Sgt. W. Churchill, Northumberland Fusiliers (Wallsend)
- Sgt. W. B. Churchman, Royal Engineers (College Park, London)
- Act. Cpl. G. Clark, Royal Highlanders (Kirkcaldy)
- L. Cpl. J. W. Clark, Durham Light Inf. (Easington Colliery)
- L. Cpl. R. C. Clark, Royal Engineers (Leytonstone)
- C.S. Maj. A. W. Clarke, Army Cyclist Corps (Basington)
- Pte. W. L. Claydon, Royal West Surrey Reg. (Colchester)
- Sgt. W. Clayton, Royal Garrison Arty. (Uxbridge)
- Cpl. W. E. Clayton, Royal Garrison Arty. (Poplar, London)
- Reg.al Q.M.S. J. H. Code, Manchester Reg. (Manchester)
- C.S. Maj. W. Coldwell, Lincolnshire Reg. (Sheffield)
- Sgt. A. J. Cole, Somerset Light Inf. (Henhin, near Bristol)
- Sgt. A. Coles, South Wales Borderers (Withington Station, near Hereford)
- R.S. Maj. J. T. Colver, Yorkshire Reg. (Leicester)
- Pte. E. A. Comer, Dragoon Guards (Addlebourne)
- Battery Sergeant Major H. F. Conway, Royal Field Arty. (Uxbridge)
- C.S. Maj. J. B. Cook, Royal Lancaster Reg. (Walney)
- Sgt. F. J. Cooper, East Surrey Reg. (Shoeburyness)
- Sgt. J. Cooper, Gordon Highlanders (Glasgow)
- Sgt. T. Cooper, Essex Reg. (Swaffam, Buibeck, Camb.)
- C.S. Maj. E. Copping, Grenadier Guards (Clapham Junction)
- Cpl. W. Cornell, Royal Field Arty. (Saffron Walden)
- Sgt. W. H. Couldwell, Oxfordshire & Buckinghamshire Light Inf. (Reading)
- Warrant Ofc. Class 2 W. J. Coward, Gloucestershire Reg. (Stroud, Glouc.)
- Pte. J. Cowell, Welsh Reg. (Llandudno)
- B.Q.M. Sgt. A. J. Cowley, Royal Field Arty. (Glanworth, County Cork)
  - Far. Staff Sergeant L. Crabtree, Royal Field Arty. (Exeter)
- Sgt. J. Croft, Royal Irish Rifles (Dunmurry)
- B.Q.M. Sgt. W. Crombie, King's Own Scottish Borderers (Carlow)
- A. Bombardier A. W. Crook, Royal Garrison Arty. (Stamford)
- Sgt. C. E. Crooks, Nottinghamshire and Derbyshire Reg. (Mansfield Woodhouse)
- Sgt. J. W. Crosby, Royal Garrison Arty. (Wickford, Essex) Royal Marine Arty.
- Cpl. F. Cross, Royal Marine Arty.
- Cpl. C. H. Crowlie, Royal Field Arty. (Fulbam, London)
- C.Q.M.S. G. Crump, Worcestershire Reg. (Worcester)
- Sgt. W. Cryer, Lancashire Fusiliers (Facit, Lancaster)
- Sgt. W. Cunniugton, Royal Field Arty. (Huddersfield)
- C.S. Maj. F. Currey, Durham Light Inf. (Darlington)
- B.Q.M. Sgt. J. Currie, Royal Garrison Arty. (Barrow-in-Furness)
- C.S. Maj. G. Cuswoxth, West Yorkshire Reg. (Leeds)
- Sgt. R. Cuthall, Royal Field Arty. (Arbroath)
- C.S. Maj. W. F. Dachtier, London Reg. (London)
- Battery Sergeant Major H. Daft, Royal Garrison Arty. (Clayton)
- Battery Sergeant Major W. G. Dagg, Royal Field Arty. (Emsworth)
- Sgt. J. Diare, South Wales Borderers (Llanhilleth, Mon.)
- Act. R.S. Maj. P. Darroch, Royal Scots (Prestonpans)
- Sgt. E. N. Davey, Royal Engineers (Wimbledon Park)
- L. Sergeant H. V. Davey, Army Cyclist Corps (Hamworth)
- Act. R.S. Maj. J. C. Davidge, Welsh Reg. (Abergavemiy)
- 2nd Cpl. J. H. Davies, Royal Engineers (Softball)
- R.S. Maj. W. Davies, South Wales Borderers (Poanswick, Glouc.)
- Pte. G. Davis, Border Reg. (Bishopstake)
- Sgt. L. Dawe, Royal Field Arty. (Walthamstow)
- Sgt. M. Dawes, Royal Field Arty. (Burnley)
- Gnr. F. G. C. Dawson, Royal Garrison Arty. (Blackheath)
- Battery Sergeant Major E. Day, Royal Horse Arty. (Great Staughton, near St. Neots)
- Sgt. F. C. Debenham, Royal Field Arty. (Bergholt, near Colchester)
- C.S. Maj. C. J. Deeprose, Royal Sussex Reg. (Rye)
- L. Cpl. A. Devenish, Northumberland Fusiliers (Cornsay, County Durham)
- C.S. Maj. E. Dickinson, Machine Gun Corps (Grimsby)
- Sgt. F. Dickinson, Middlesex Reg. (Leith, Scotland)
- Pte. M. Dixon, Shropshire Light Inf. (Gelli, Rhondda)
- Cpl. Fitter, W. Dixon, Royal Field Arty. (Leeds)
- L. Cpl. G. W. H. Dobson, Military Mounted Police (Whiteleafe, Surrey)
- Sgt. G. Donaldson, Yorkshire Light Inf. (Milford)
- Sgt. E. J. Donhou, Royal Engineers (Hanwell, London)
- Sgt. J. Douglas, King's Own Scottish Borderers (Greenlaw)
- Sgt. H. Driver, West Riding Reg. (Bingley)
- Sgt. A. W. Duffield, Royal Garrison Arty. (Middlesbrough)
- Pte. D1 Duncan, Royal Scots Fusiliers (Kilmarnock)
- Cpl. F. Duncan, Royal Engineers (Tayport, Fife)
- Battery Sergeant Major S. Eardley, Royal Garrison Arty. (Newcastle, Staffs.)
- C.S. Maj. M. Earls, Welsh Reg. (Swansea)
- Battery Sergeant Major F. W. Eastley, Royal Garrison Arty. (Southampton)
- Cpl. O. J. Edwardes, Royal Engineers (Byfleet)
- Battery Sergeant Major A. Elliott, Royal Field Arty. (Southampton)
- L. Cpl. J. W. Elliott, Northumberland Fusiliers (Darlington)
- Sgt. P. G. Elpiuck, Royal Sussex Reg. (Newick)
- C.S. Maj. F. Emmott, Machine Gun Corps (Leeds)
- L. Cpl. W. Etchells, Manchester Reg. (Manchester)
- Sgt. A.H Evans, Welsh Guards (Marshfield, near Cardiff)
- Mechanist Sergeant Major G. A. L. Evans, Army Service Corps (East London)
- Sgt. H. V. Evans, West Yorkshire Reg. (Stoke, Staffs.)
- Gnr. T. Evans, Royal Horse Arty. (Barnfurlong, near Wigan)
- Act. Bombr. H. Eyre, Royal Field Arty. (Chesterfield)
- Sgt. A. Falconer, Machine Gun Company (Walthamstow)
- Battery Sergeant Major F. Farlie, Royal Horse Arty. (Plumstead)
- Sgt. P. Fiarrell, Manchester Reg. (Huddersfield)
- Sgt. G. Feast, South Wales Borderers (Eastney, Portsmouth)
- Sgt. W. R. Feaver, Middlesex Reg. (Marden, Kent)
- Spr. W. J. Feman, Royal Engineers (Liverpool)
- C.S. Maj. A. Ferrier, Royal Highlanders (Perth)
- Cpl. F. S. Fisher, Royal Field Arty. (Netley, Hamps.)
- Sgt. J. Fletcher, Royal Garrison Arty. (Oxford)
- C.S. Maj. R. Fletcher, Northumberland Fusiliers (Walker-on-Tyne)
- Sgt. J. Flett, Argyll and Sutherland Highlanders (Greenock)
- Sgt. W. Flynn, Lancashire Fusiliers (Salford)
- R.S. Maj. J. H. Foley, Royal Warwickshire Reg. (Barmingham)
- Cpl. C. Ford, Scottish Rifles (Hamilton)
- Act. Cpl. F. Forster, Middlesex Reg. (Heaton Bark, Manchester)
- Battery Sergeant Major J. W. Foster, Royal Field Arty. (Hull)
- Sgt. G. Fowler, North Lancashire Reg. (Dartford, Kent)
- Sgt. W. Fraser, Highland Light Inf. (Glasgow)
- Pte. E. P. Freeman, Coldstream Guards (Goswell-road, London, EC)
- Cpl. C. J. French, Royal Flying Corps (Watford, Herts.)
- L. Cpl. R. H. Froude, Royal Engineers (Curraghmore, County Waterford)
- Sgt. W. H. Fryer, Machine Gun Corps (Paddington)
- Sgt. E. W. Fulford, Royal Engineers (Bedford)
- L. Cpl. E. Gaddes, Lancashire Fusiliers (Longtown)
- Sgt. J. Galvin, Royal Garrison Arty. (Cork)
- Sgt. L. Galvin, West Riding Reg. (Marlborough)
- Cpl. G. C. Gane, Somerset Light Inf. (Shepton Mallet)
- Cpl. A. Gardner, Royal Scots (Irlam o' th' Heights, Lancaster)
- Siapr W. T. Garner, Royal Engineers (Blefaohley)
- Sgt. P. Garrod, Royal Fusiliers (Stevenage)
- Pte. J. Geoghan, Lancashire Fusiliers (E. West Hartlepool)
- Sgt. F. Gibbs, Royal Welsh Fusiliers (Birmingham)
- Sgt. C. E. Gillott, Royal Engineers (Sheffield)
- Sgt. W. Gilmore, Northumberland Fusiliers (Hull)
- 2nd Cpl. G. A. Glover, Royal Engineers (Paddington)
- Sgt. F. Godley, King's Royal Rifle Corps (Whitwell, Derby)
- Battery Sergeant Major P. F. Golding, Royal Garrison Arty. (Kensington)
- Sgt. A. T. Goodey, South Staffordshire Reg. (Clapham Common, London)
- Sgt. M. Goodwin, Lancashire Fusiliers (Winton Pairieroft)
- Sgt. W. J. Goodwin, Rifle Brigade (Brightlingsea)
- Sgt. E. Gordon, Royal Engineers (S.R) (Newton-le-Willows, Lancaster)
- Cpl. J. Gorman, Royal Engineers (Liverpool)
- Sgt. H. Gouldthorpe, Lincolnshire Reg. (Barton-on-Humber)
- Pte. J. H. Govan, Scots Guards (Prestonkirk, E. Lothian)
- Dvr. C. S. Gowing, Royal Garrison Arty. (Close, near Bristol)
- Sgt. W. M. Graham, Royal Garrison Arty. (Peckham)
- C.S. Maj. G. R. Graves, Machine Gun Company (Ashted, Birmingham)
- Battery Sergeant Major P. E. Gray, Royal Field Arty. (Leicester)
- Lance Seaman D. H. Green, Royal Naval Volunteer Reserve (Falkirk)
- Cpl. G. H. Green, Royal Field Arty. (Tideswell)
- L. Sgt. E. Grey, Welsh Reg. (Swansea)
- Sgt. R. A. B. Griffiths, Royal Garrison Arty. (Blackburn)
- Sgt. S. Grover, Welsh Reg. (Poitslade)
- C.S. Maj. H. R. Groves, East Lancashire Reg. (Poplar, London)
- C.Q.M.S. H. Haigh, West Riding Reg. (Greetland, Yorkshire)
- Pte. H. Haigh, West Riding Reg. (Lindley, Haddersfield)
- Sadd. Staff Sergeant A. Hall, Royal Field Arty. (Brighton)
- Sgt. A. E. Hall, Royal Garrison Arty. (Old Walsoken)
- Sgt. E. Hall, Middlesex Reg. (Preston, Lancaster)
- C.S. Maj. E. W. Hall, Machine Gun Corps (Norwich)
- Cpl. L. Hall, West Riding Reg. Stalybridge)
- Sgt. S. E. Hall, King's Own Scottish Borderers (Cockerham)
- Ftr Cpl. P. Hampson, Royal Garrison Arty. (Birmingham)
- C.S. Maj. R. Hanley, Rifle Brigade (Virginia Water)
- Spr. J. Hannah, Royal Engineers (Clydeburgh)
- C.Q.M.S. G. Hardie, Royal Engineers (Glasgow)
- Gnr. C. Harding, Royal Field Arty. (Cardiff)
- Gnr. E. Hardman, Royal Garrison Arty. (Waterfoot)
- Sgt. P. Hardy, Royal Engineers (Durham)
- Cpl. W. H. Harris, Royal Garrison Arty. (Grosvenorroad, London)
- Spr. R. G. Harrison, Royal Engineers (Notting Hill)
- Sgt. J. R. Harrop, Nottinghamshire and Derbyshire Reg. (Worksop)
- Battery Sergeant Major J. Hart, Royal Field Arty. (Hebburn)
- C.Q.M.S. C. Hartley, West Yorkshire Reg. (Keighley)
- Gnr. M. Hartley, Royal Garrison Arty. (Burnley)
- Sgt. A. R. Hervey-Bathurst, Royal Flying Corps (London)
- C.Q.M.S. S. M. Haydon, Royal West Kent Reg. (Sandwich)
- Sgt. F. J. Haynes, Lancashire Fusiliers (Openshaw, Manchester)
- Sgt. J. H. Heath, Middlesex Reg. (Hove, Brighton)
- Battery Sergeant Major W. Heath Royal Garrison Arty. (Woodford, Essex)
- C.S. Maj. J. Helhwell, Yorkshire Light Inf. (Pontefract)
- Dvr. H. Henthorne, Royal Field Arty. (Oldham)
- L. Cpl. W. J. Herring, King's Royal Rifle Corps (King's Cross, London)
- Sgt. H. E. Hibbard, Honourable Arty. Company (Stoke Newington)
- Pte. C. H. Hill, East Lancashire Reg. (Barlowford, Nelson)
- Sgt. W. Hill, North Staffordshire Reg. (Wooton, Staffs.)
- C.S. Maj. F. Hillier, South Wales Borderers (Newport)
- Act. Cpl. G. Hnidle (Preston)
- C.S. Maj. A. G. Hiron, London Reg. (Limehouse, London)
- Sgt. H. Hirst, West Riding Reg. (Batley)
- Dvr. A. G. Hobbs, Royal Field Arty. (Birmingham)
- B.Q.M. Sgt. A. Hodgson, Northumberland Fusiliers (Annfield Plain, County Durham)
- Sgt. W. W. Hogben, Royal Welsh Fusiliers (Portsmouth)
- Sgt. J. Holbrook, Manchester Reg. (Manchester)
- Sgt. F. Holliday, Royal Garrison Arty. (Cottingliam)
- Act. Battery Sergeant Major Major E. Hollidge, Royal Field Arty. (Upper Tooting)
- Sgt. A. E. Holmes, Royal Irish Rifles (Carrickfergus)
- L. Cpl. B. Holmes, Royal Warwickshire Reg. (Rugby)
- Sgt. F. G. Holmes, Hussars (Candahar Barracks, Tidworth)
- C.Q.M.S. F. Holt, Royal Engineers (Wmnick, Northants)
- Sgt. J. Holton, Royal Irish Fusiliers (Clonaslea, Queens County)
- Sgt. J. Hook, Durham Light Inf. (Durham)
- Spr. J. W. Howarth, Royal Engineers (Bolton)
- Battery Sergeant Major G. Howell, Royal Field Arty. (Blakeley)
- C.S. Maj. W. Howes, Durham Light Inf. (Stockton, Durham)
- Dvr. F. T. Howitt, Royal Field Arty. (Aberdeen)
- Tmp R.S. Maj. R. A. Hoyle, Lancashire Fusiliers (Bury)
- Pte. A. H. Hudson, Royal Warwickshire Reg. (Coventry)
- C.S. Maj. R. Hudson, Yorkshire Light Inf. (Normanton)
- Pte. J. Hughes, RAMC (Manchester)
- Sgt. T. Hughes, Royal Garrison Arty. (Sheerness, Kent)
- Sgt. J. E. Humphreys, Royal Field Arty. (Tunstall, Staffs.)
- Act. Sgt. G. W. Hunt, Nottinghamshire and Derbyshire Reg. (Nottingham)
- Battery Sergeant Major J. Hunt, Royal Garrison Arty. (Higher Broughton, Manchester)
- Spr. J. Hunt, Royal Engineers (High Wycombe)
- L. Cpl. D. Hunter, Yorkshire Reg. (Bradford)
- C.S. Maj. B. H. D. Hurst, Royal Engineers (Bath)
- Sgt. E. Hutchms, Machine Gun Corps (Manchester)
- Battery Sergeant Major J. C. Ihffe, Royal Garrison Arty. (Wakefield)
- Act. C.S. Maj. E. Irving, Coldstream Guards (Walworth, London)
- C.Q.M.S. G. Irving, Border Reg. (Waberthwaite)
- C.Q.M.S. J. Jacks, Royal Munster Fusiliers (Leeds)
- Sgt. J. J. Jackson, Yorkshire Reg. (Stockton-on-Tees)
- C.S. Maj. T. Jackson, Machine Gun Corps (Birmingham)
- L. Cpl. W. C. Jacobs, Royal Warwickshire Reg. (Stow-on-the-Wold)
- Pte. E. Jaoobson, Monmouthshire Reg. (Bristol)
- C.S. Maj. G. Jaggs, Essex Reg. (Boxted, near Colchester)
- C.S. Maj. A. Jenkins, Worcestershire Reg. (Worcester)
- C.S. Maj. E. H. Johns, Royal Engineers (Norwich)
- Sgt. E. A. Johnson, Royal Garrison Arty. (Walthamstow)
- Cpl. F. W. Johnson, Royal Engineers (Mildmay Park, London)
- Pte. T. Johnson, Rifle Brigade (Stockton)
- Sgt. S. Johnstone, Scottish Rifles (Whiteinch)
- Sgt. A. Jones, Royal Welsh Fusiliers (Wrexham)
- Sgt. A. Jones, Machine Gun Corps (Stoke-under-Ham)
- L. Cpl. . G. Jones, Duke of Cornwall's Light Inf. (Plaistow)
- L. Cpl. J. Jones, Manchester Reg. (Henfeod, S. Wales)
- Cpl. J. P. Jones, Royal Garrison Arty. (Birmingham)
- R.S. Maj. J. R. Jones MC Royal Welsh Fusiliers (Straff ord)
- Spr. R. Jones, Royal Engineers (Merioneth)
- Act. Staff Sergeant S. Jones, Army Ordnance Corps (Birmingham)
- Cpl. T. Jones, West Yorkshire Reg. (Bradford)
- Sgt. W. Jones, Machine Gun Corps (Bermondsey, London)
- Sqn. S. M. H. Jordison (Northampton)
- C.S. Maj. J. Joshua, Welsh Reg. (Maesteg
- Sgt. J. W. Judd, Middlesex Reg. (Kingston upon Thames)
- C.S. Maj. H. Julsing, Northumberland Fusiliers (Newcastle upon Tyne)
- C.S. Maj. J. Kellock, Highland Light Inf. (Glasgow)
- Pte. A. Kelly, Manchester Reg. (Manchester)
- Pte. E. Kelly, Royal Dublin Fusiliers (Fencehouses, Durham)
- Sgt. J. Kelly, Royal Garrison Arty. (Cork)
- Sgt. J. S. Kelly, Seaforth Highlanders (Springburn, Glasgow)
- Sgt. H. Kendal, Royal Engineers (Bradford)
- Sgt. A. Kendall, Royal Garrison Arty. (Brixton)
- Battery Sergeant Major C. A. Kendall, Royal Field Arty. (Ilford)
- Battery Sergeant Major J. Kennelly, Royal Garrison Arty. (Edinburgh)
- Sgt. H. Kent, Royal Garrison Arty. (Malmesbury, Wiltshire)
- Pte. A. Kerr, Royal Scots Fusiliers (E. Dumbarton)
- Dvr. H. Kirby, Royal Field Arty. (Woodville Derby)
- Cpl. H. S. Kirk, Highland Light Inf. (Whiteinch, Glasgow)
- Battery Sergeant Major F. A. J. Knight, Royal Field Arty. (Bristol)
- L. Cpl. J. W. Knight, Royal Engineers (Southampton)
- Cpl. C. Knowles, Duke of Cornwall's Light Inf. (Victoria Park)
- L. Cpl. W. Knowlson, West Yorkshire Reg. (Leeds)
- Q.M.S. W. Lamkin, RAMC (Ventnor, Isle of Wight)
- Fitter Sergeant T. Lancaster, Royal Field Arty. (Workington, Cumberland)
- Sgt. J. R. Lang, Shropshire Light Inf. (Edgwareroad, London)
- C.S. Maj. E. Langley, Lancashire Fusiliers (Chadderton)
- C.Q.M.S. W. T. Large, Cheshire Reg. (Northwich)
- C.S. Maj. H. Larkman (Norwich)
- C.S. Maj. A. Laurence, Nottinghamshire and Derbyshire Reg. (E. Derby)
- L. Cpl. L. C. G. T. Lawford, Mil. Police (Keyhaven, near Lymington, Hampshire)
- Spr. R. Lawson, Royal Engineers (Glasgow)
- R.S. Maj. O. Lead, North Staffordshire Reg. (Wolstanton, Staffs.)
- Sgt. J. W. Leamon, Hampshire Reg. (Woolwich)
- Sgt. E. Ledgard, West Yorkshire Reg. (York)
- Sgt. S. G. Lee, West Riding Reg. (Marsh, Huddersfield)
- Q.M.S. R. G. Leggett, RAMC (Aldershot)
- L. Cpl. M. Lennard, Northumberland Fusiliers (Burnhope Co Durham)
- Pte. W. Lennon, Lancashire Fusiliers (Piestwick)
- Pte. J. Leverton, Duke of Cornwall's Light Inf. (St. Columb, Cornwall)
- Pte. J. Lifford, Liverpool Reg. (Fulham)
- Sgt. E. Lilley, King's Royal Rifle Corps (New Nuttall, Nottinghamshire)
- Sgt. J. S. Lindsay, Army Cyclist Corps (Auchenairn, Bishopbriggs)
- Sgt. A. P. Lincoln, Royal Field Arty. (Greater Yarmouth)
- Pte. W. C. T. Lloyd, Royal Welsh Fusiliers (Holywell)
- R.S. Maj. G. Lockie, South Wales Borderers (Farringdon Rd., London)
- Sgt. E. E. Loosemore, Royal Engineers (Bournemouth)
- Sgt. J. F. Love, Royal Field Arty. (Parkstone, Dorset)
- Cpl. C. E. Lowe, Royal West Surrey Reg. (Barkingside, London)
- Cpl. A. G. Ludlow, Royal Fusiliers (Tottenham)
- Bombr. W. G. Mabbutt, Headquarters, Royal Field Arty. (Shipston-on-Stour)
- Act. Sgt. A. Macaulay, Machine Gun Company (Peith)
- Pte. C. E. V. Macdonald, Cav. S.R. (Fort Rose, Ross-shire)
- C.S. Maj. B. Maddock, Nottinghamshire and Derbyshire Reg. (Repton, Derby.)
- Sgt. A. Macdonald, Seaforth Highlanders (Alness)
- C.S. Maj. W. Hackerell, Royal Engineers (Norwich)
- Sgt. W. R. MacQueen, Machine Gun Corps (E. London)
- Sgt. G. W. Marriott, Royal Field Arty. (Homerton, London)
- Sgt. E. Marritt, East Yorkshire Reg. (Hull)
- Sgt. H. G. Marsh, Royal West Kent Reg. (Deal)
- Act. B.Q.M. Sgt. D. Marshall, Royal Field Arty. (Blackpool)
- Sgt. L. T. Marson, Military Mounted Police (Biggleswade, Bedford)
- Sgt. J. Martin, Royal Field Arty. (Streatham Hill)
- C.S. Maj. J. Martin, Lancashire Fusiliers (Manchester)
- Cpl. T. Martin, Royal Engineers (West Hartlepool)
- R.S. Maj. B. H. Mathews, Cambridgeshire Reg. (Cambridge)
- Gnr. T. C. Matthews, Royal Horse Arty.
- Sgt. J. H. Mason, Royal Garrison Arty. (Birkenhead)
- Sgt. W. E. Mawbey, Machine Gun Corps (Pimlico, London)
- Cpl. R. May, Manchester Reg.
- Fitter Sergeant R. Maynard, Royal Field Arty. (Camborne, Cornwall)
- C.S. Maj. S. Mayers, Machine Gun Corps (Newport, Isle of Wight)
- Sgt. P. McAleavey, Royal Field Arty. (Cleator Moor, Whitehaven)
- Cpl. J. McAllister, Royal Engineers (Stirlingshire)
- Sgt. D. McAlpine, Highland Light Inf. (Partick/Glasgow)
- Pte. F. McCann, Royal West Surrey Reg. (Hammersmith)
- Sgt. J. McCarthy, Leinster Reg. (Cork)
- Sgt. T. McClure, Royal Garrison Arty. (Thornastown, County Kilkenny)
- C.S. Maj. A. A. McDonald, Royal Engineers (Highams Park)
- C.S. Maj. J. McDonald, Argyll and Sutherland Highlanders (Argyllshire)
- L. Cpl. H. McCann, Royal Engineers (Glasgow)
- Pte. J. McEwan, Gordon Highlanders (Dumfries)
- Sgt. D. A. McFarlane, Welsh Reg. (Canada)
- R.S. Maj. E. McGarry, Lancashire Fusiliers (Oldham)
- Act. Bdr E. McGinms, Royal Field Arty. (Springburn, Glasgow)
- Sgt. O. McGuinness, Irish Guards (Edgwareroad, London)
- Sgt. S. McInnes, Royal Engineers (Thomaby)
- C.S. Maj. J. McIntosh, Highland Light Inf. (Newton Grange)
- Sgt. S. McIntyre, Royal Garrison Arty. (Millport)
- Sgt. W. McKeown, Machine Gun Corps (Glasgow)
- Sgt. J. McKintosh, Gordon Highlanders (Aberdeen)
- R.S. Maj. J. McLean, Royal Scots Fusiliers (Aberdeen)
- Sgt. T. McLeod, Northumberland Fusiliers (Achington)
- Sgt. E. McNary, Royal Field Arty. (Wexford)
- Staff Sergeant T. McNicol, RAMC (Derby)
- Battery Sergeant Major H. Meathrel, Royal Horse Arty. (Devon)
- Battery Sergeant Major G. Menzies, Royal Garrison Arty. (Dumbarton)
- B.Q.M. Sgt. F. J. Mersh, Hatnps. R. Anerley, London)
- Sgt. E. Miles, Royal Engineers (Pontyffym)
- C.S. Maj. S. Mills, Worcestershire Reg. (Dudley)
- Sgt. C. R. Milton, Scottish Rifles (Ramsgate)
- C.S. Maj. R. M. Mitchell, Royal Highlanders (Perth)
- Sgt. W. Mitchell, Cameron Highlanders (Taynuilt, Argyll)
- Sgt. F. Moles, Machine Gun Corps (New Southgate, London)
- Sgt. J. Moody, Machine Gun Corps (Newcastle)
- Sgt. J. H. Moody, Rifle Brigade (Rochdale)
- Sgt. J. Mooney, King's Own Scottish Borderers (Johnstone)
- Sgt. A. T. Moore, Essex Reg. (Leyton)
- Pte. F. Moore, Royal Dublin Fusiliers
- Cpl. J. Moran, RAMC (Longsight, Manchester)
- Cpl. J. F. Morgan, Liverpool Reg. (Liverpool)
- Sgt. E. Morris, Lancashire Fusiliers (Higher Ince, Wigan)
- Sgt. S. Morris, Royal Engineers (Stafford)
- C.S. Maj. G. Moss, Manchester Reg. (Leigh)
- Sgt. J. E. Moss, Liverpool Reg. (Liverpool)
- Cpl. W. G. Mould, Lancers (Aberaman)
- Sgt. W. J. Mulrooney, Royal Engineers (Stoke-on-Trent)
- Gnr. F. Munday, Royal Garrison Arty. (Woking)
- Battery Sergeant Major J. Munn, Royal Garrison Arty. (Southend)
- B.Q.M. Sgt. Major P. S. Munro, Seaforth Highlanders (Edinburgh)
- C.S. Maj. F. G. Murphy, Lancashire Fusiliers (Bury)
- C.S. Maj. G. Murphy, Labour Corps (Birmingham)
- Spr. A. J. Murray, Royal Engineers (Bristol)
- Sgt. J. L. Murray, Royal Engineers (Chelsea)
- C.S. Maj. H. J. S. Neate, Royal Engineers (Southsea)
- Sgt. E. G. Newman, Royal Field Arty. (Boio Green, Kent)
- C.S. Maj. T. P. Newman, Royal West Surrey Reg.
- C.S. Maj. M. Newton, Royal Lancaster Reg. (Broughton-in-Furness)
- C.S. Maj. J. Nicholson, Royal Irish Rifles (Carrickfergus)
- Sgt. A. Nickson, North Lancashire Reg. (Preston, Lancaster)
- C.S. Maj. J. Norns, Hampshire Reg. (Martyr Worthy, near Winchester)
- C.S. Maj. J. O'Brien, Royal Fusiliers (Moirtlake)
- Pte. J. Odell, Seaforth Highlanders (Amptjnll)
- C.S. Maj. A. O'Nious, South Lancashire Reg. (Douglas, Isle of Man)
- Sgt. B. St. C. Owen, Royal Engineers (Bristol)
- C.S. Maj. G. Owens, Royal Welsh Fusiliers (Wrexham)
- Act. Staff Sergeant H. Owen, Army Ordnance Corps (Bolton)
- C.S. Maj. C. E. W. Parish, Machine Gun Corps (Brecon)
- Battery Sergeant Major A. Parker, Royal Field Arty. (Clonmel)
- C.S. Maj. W. B. Parker, Durham Light Inf. (Bishopwearmouth)
- Sgt. W. W. Pass, East Kent Reg. (Darlaston, Staffs.)
- C.S. Maj. J. B. Pearce, Royal Engineers (Ilford)
- Pte. P. Pearson, Royal Dublin Fusiliers (Dublin)
- Sgt. E. Pegg, North Staffordshire Reg. (Fenton, Staffs.)
- C.Q.M.S. L. Pegg, Lancashire Fusiliers (Salford)
- Pte. H. R. Penan, Machine Gun Corps (Romford, London)
- Sgt. W. G. Perkins, Royal Field Arty. (Bristol)
- Tmp Staff Sergeant Major J. Peiks, Army Service Corps (Henley-n-Arden)
- Cpl. S. Petty, Royal Engineers (Hanogale)
- Sgt. J. Phillips, Northumberland Fusiliers (Seaton DeLaval)
- Bombr. P. W. Phillips, Royal Garrison Arty. (Walton, Radnorshire)
- Cpl. H. O. Pike, Nottinghamshire and Derbyshire Reg. (Manchester)
- Sgt. W. Pilkington, East Lancashire Reg. (Accrington)
- Sgt. H. Pinder, Royal Engineers (Darwen)
- C.S. Maj. E. Pink, Essex Reg. (Enfield)
- C.S. Maj. C. B. Plenderleith, Royal Warwickshire Reg. (Birmingham)
- L. Cpl. P. Pocock, Military Mounted Police (Edenbridge, Kent)
- B.Q.M. Sgt. J. H. Poste, Royal Warwickshire Reg. (Birmingham)
- Sgt. H. W. Potter, Manchester Reg. (Fliston)
- L. Sgt. J. TPotter, South Lancashire Reg. (St. Helens)
- R.S. Maj. W. J. Potter, Manchester Reg. (E. Woolwich)
- Sgt. A. Price, Royal Garrison Arty. (Caversham, Oxon.)
- Sgt. J. Price, South Lancashire Reg. (Warrington)
- Sgt. W. Price, RAMC (Brookend, Glouc.)
- Cpl. E. Proctor, Liverpool Reg. (Milnthorpe)
- C.S. Maj. Puchas, South Staffordshire Reg. (Brownhills, near Walsall)
- C.S. Maj. H. Pugh, Liverpool Reg. (Sandhurst, Cheshire)
- R.S. Maj. G. Pullan, Northumberland Fusiliers (Farnley)
- 2nd Cpl. C. Purdy, Royal Engineers (Langley Hill, Derby)
- Battery Sergeant Major W. J. Pye, Royal Field Arty. (Colchester)
- Sgt. J. Rands, Royal Field Arty. (Sheffield)
- Gnr. A. H. Rankin, Royal Garrison Arty. (Thornhill)
- Sgt. W. Banner, Essex Reg. (Southend)
- B.Q.M. Sgt. C. Ratcliffe, Royal Field Arty. (Leek, Staffs.)
- Pte. W. J. Rawlings, Duke of Cornwall's Light Inf. (St. Austell)
- Cpl. F. Read, Royal Engineers (Chippenham)
- B.Q.M. Sgt. A. H. Reed, Royal Field Arty. (Lowe-Clapton, London)
- Sgt. J. Reeves, Royal Garrison Arty. (Brixton, London)
- Sgt. W. Revell, Leicestershire Reg. (Bavenstone, Leics.)
- C.S. Maj. W. H. Ricketts, South Wales Borderers (Pontypool)
- Bin. A. Richards, King's Royal Rifle Corps (Southampton)
- Sgt. D. Richards, Labour Corps (Egremont)
- Sgt. W. J. Richards, North Staffordshire Reg. (Rugeley)
- Sgt. A. Richardson, Coldstream Guards (Birmingham)
- C.S. Maj. C. W. Richardson, Northumberland Fusiliers (Newcastle)
- Sgt. G. Richardson, Machine Gun Corps (Ipswich)
- Sgt. H. Rider, Royal Field Arty. (Sheffield)
- Sgt. S. L. Ridgway, West Riding Reg. (Hadfield, Glossop)
- Sgt. G. W. Ridyard, Lancashire Fusiliers (Hightown)
- Battery Sergeant Major A. Rimmer, Royal Field Arty. (St. Helens)
- Sgt. A. Roberts, Yorkshire Light Inf. (Sheffield)
- Sgt. J. Roberts, Monmouthshire Reg. (Talywain, Poratypool, Mon.)
- C.S. Maj. W. J. Roberts, Manchester Reg. (Manchester)
- Sgt. D. Robertson, Tank Corps (Aberfeldy)
- Sgt. W. E. Robertson, Royal Marine Field Arty. (Carlisle)
- Act. C.S. Maj. F. Robinson Tank Corps (Bridlington)
- Sgt. T. Robinson, Durham Light Inf. (Durham)
- Rfn. A. Roe, King's Royal Rifle Corps (Balderton, Newark)
- 2nd Cpl. J. Rogers, Royal Engineers (Todmorden)
- Cpl. S. Rogers, Royal Field Arty. (Wealdstone)
- Sgt. H. Rollinson, South Staffordshire Reg. (Bilston, Staffs.)
- Sgt. E. A. Rose, Royal Engineers (Thornton Heath)
- C.S. Maj. R. Rowan, Highland Light Inf. (Glasgow)
- Cpl. W. Rowe, Mil Mounted Police (Castleford, Yorkshire)
- Gnr. F. H. Rundle, Royal Garrison Arty. (Plymouth)
- Sgt. S. Russell, East Yorkshire Reg. (Elloughton, near Brough, Yorkshire)
- C.Q.M.S. S. Salmon, Monmouthshire Reg. (Hammersmith)
- Gnr. J. J. Salkeld, Royal Garrison Arty. (Cockermouth)
- B.Q.M. Sgt. G. Samson, Worcestershire Reg. (Worcester)
- C.S. Maj. F. Sanditson, Royal Fusiliers (Twickenham)
- C.S. Maj. A. H. Sands, Royal Marine Light Inf. (Storehouse, Plymouth)
- Cpl. J. W. Savage, Royal Engineers (Birmingham)
- Cpl. J. W. Savin, Royal Field Arty. (Sedgley, near Dudley)
- L. Cpl. J. Scott, Royal Engineers (Liverpool)
- C.S. Maj. R. Scott, Middlesex Reg. (Stroud Green, London)
- Sgt. H. Scrimshaw, Nottinghamshire and Derbyshire Reg. (Mansfield)
- C.Q.M.S. M. A. Searle, Highland Light Inf. (Worrnit, Fifeshire)
- C.S. Maj., S. Searle, South Wales Borderers (Peckham, London)
- Cpl. E. Seed, Lancashire Fusiliers (Blackburn)
- Sgt. J. Seton, Argyll and Sutherland Highlanders (Glasgow)
- Sgt. C. J. Shale, Duke of Cornwall's Light Inf. (Coventry)
- Cpl. Shoeing-Smith J. Sharp, Royal Field Arty. (Kilmarnock)
- Sgt. H. Shaw, Royal Engineers (Musselburgh)
- Fitter J. A. Shearer, Royal Field Arty. (Glasgow)
- Sgt. F. J. Sheldon, Royal Garrison Arty. (Croydon)
- Sgt. J. Shimmings, Coldstream Guards (Holsworthy, Devon.)
- Petty Ofc. H. J. Simon, Royal Naval Volunteer Reserve (Hurst, Bixley)
- Pte. W. Simpson, Northumberland Fusiliers (West Sleekburn, Bedlington)
- B.Q.M. Sgt. R. Sinclair, Royal Garrison Arty. (Leith)
- Cpl. H. Singleton, Royal Horse Arty. (Manchester)
- Gnr. J. J. R. Singleton, Royal Garrison Arty. (Manchester)
- Cpl. S. C. Sircombe, Royal Engineers (Bristol)
- Pte. G. Slater, Dragoon Guards (Wmsford)
- C.S. Maj. T. W. Slater, Nottinghamshire and Derbyshire Reg. (Matlock, Bath)
- Spr. P. A. Sly, Royal Engineers (Sheale)
- Sgt. Major H. Smart, Yorkshire Light Inf. (Worcestershire)
- Cpl. A. G. Smith, Royal Warwickshire Reg. (Birmingham)
- Sgt. A. S. Smith, Royal Field Arty. (Notting Hill Gate)
- R.S. Maj. G. F. W. Smith, Dragoon Guards (Battersea)
- Cpl. J. H. Smith, Royal Engineers (Peterborough)
- Bombr. L. E. Smith, Royal Garrison Arty. (Hanworth)
- Act. Cpl. R. Smith, Royal Scots (Armadale)
- C.S. Maj. W. Smith, Gordon Highlanders (Clydebank, Glasgow)
- Cpl. W. Smith, Royal Engineers (Newport, Mon.)
- Sgt. J. V. Solari, Nottinghamshire and Derbyshire Reg., attd. Machine Gun Corps
- Sgt. A. Speake, Welsh Reg. (Trealaw)
- C.S. Maj. C. Spence, West Yorkshire Reg. (Leeds)
- Cpl. C. Spivey, Yorkshire Reg. (Pocklington)
- Sgt. E. J. Spriggs, Royal Engineers (Burnham, Somerset)
- C.S. Maj. S. Sole, Leicestershire Reg. (Leicester)
- Battery Sergeant Major N. F. Spratley, Royal Garrison Arty. (Paddington, London)
- Battery Sergeant Major A. Sprott, Royal Field Arty. (Glasgow)
- Bombr. W. E. Stay, Royal Garrison Arty. (Rugby)
- Sgt. L. Stewart, Royal Field Arty. (Stony Stratford)
- Gnr. D. B. Stirling, Machine Gun Corps (Arclgour Wish aw)
- 2nd Cpl. C. M. Stone, Royal Engineers (Seaford)
- C.Q.M.S. R. V. Stone, Royal Engineers (Birmingham)
- C.S. Maj. T. A. Stuart, Lincolnshire Reg. (Ashton-under-Lyne)
- Cpl. J. Swift, Machine Gun Corps (Wimbledon, Liondon)
- L. Cpl. H. Sykes, Yorkshire Light Inf. (Batley)
- C.S. Maj. T. Sykes, Yorkshire Light Inf. (Leeds)
- Sgt. C. R. Taylor, Royal Garrison Arty. (Highgate Road)
- C.Q.M.S. T. Templeton, Royal Engineers (Glengarnock, Ayr)
- C.S. Maj. F. A. Terrill, Royal Engineers (Wealds)
- Sgt. H. W. Terry, Royal West Kent Reg. (Sevenoaks)
- C.S. Maj. W. R. Thomas, Scottish Rifles (Battersea)
- Cpl. H. Thompson, Royal Garrison Arty. (Liverpool)
- B.Q.M. Sgt.A. C. Thorpe, Royal Field Arty. (Petersfield)
- Cpl. C. V. Tighe, Middlesex Reg. (Walthamstow, Essex)
- Sgt. W. Timility, Lancashire Fusiliers (Seedley Manchester)
- Pte. C. E. Torr, West Yorkshire Reg. (Rotherham)
- C.S. Maj. J. R. Tose, West Yorkshire Reg. (York)
- B.Q.M. Sgt. P. W. Tranter, Royal Field Arty. (Carlow)
- Cpl. A. Travi, Middlesex Reg. (Islington)
- Sgt. P. W. Treacher, Royal Garrison Arty. (New-Maiden)
- Pte. T. H. Tregunna, Welsh Reg. (Swansea)
- Sgt. W. H. Trim, Royal Garrison Arty. (Lambeth)
- Sgt. W. G. Trindef, Royal Berkshire Reg. (Windsor)
- Sgt. H. Troke, Royal Engineers (Bournemouth)
- Sgt. J. W. Trotter, Durham Light Inf. (Durham)
- Sgt. F. H. TVyman, North Staffordshire Reg. (Abergavenny)
- R.S. Maj. T. G. Upton, Hussars (Preston, Lancaster)
- Sgt. A. Utton, East Yorkshire Reg. (Hull)
- Sgt. G. Veitch, Machine Gun Corps (Edinburgh)
- Sgt. H. C. Vmer, Somerset Light Inf. (London)
- Act. Colour Sergeant G. Vyse, East Yorkshire Reg.
- Cpl. -Sergeant A. Waddell, Argyll and Sutherland Highlanders (Bothkennar, Stirlingshire)
- Gnr. M. J. Wagner, Royal Field Arty. (Liverpool)
- C.S. Maj. C. F. Walker, Bedfordshire Reg. (Hitchin)
- C.S. Maj. J. Wallis, Lincolnshire Reg. (Grimsby)
- Sgt. G. Walmesley, Machine Gun Corps (Bradford)
- Sgt. J. Wareing, North Lancashire Reg. (Bolton)
- Cpl. E. J.Warwick, Royal Engineers (Pontycymmer)
- Sgt. J. A. Wassell, Royal Engineers (Fareham, Hampshire)
- Sgt. J. Waters, Northumberland Fusiliers (Gosforth)
- Pte. G. Watson, Scots Guards (Kirkonhill-by-Montrose)
- Sgt. W. Watson, Highland Light Inf. (Dundee)
- Sgt. F. W. Watt, Tank Corps (Aberdeen)
- L. Cpl. H. Watts, Traffic Control Squadron (Dovercourt, Essex)
- L. Cpl. P. Wearn, Wiltshire Reg. (Brockenhurst, Hampshire)
- Cpl. G. Webster, South Lancashire Reg. (St. Helens)
- Sgt. W. Webster, Royal Engineers (Ashby-de-la-Zouch)
- C.S. Maj. H. Weedon, Royal Fusiliers (Homerton)
- Cpl. H. F. Welfare, Northumberland Fusiliers (Newcastle)
- L. Cpl. W. J. Welham, East Lancashire Reg. (Willesden, London)
- 2nd Cpl. W. Wells, Royal Engineers (Alford, Surrey)
- Sgt. A. G. Wenden, Royal Garrison Arty. (Kingston, Portsmouth)
- Sgt. G. White, Royal Field Arty. (Liverpool)
- Sgt. H. Whitmore, Royal Garrison Arty. (W. Hampstead)
- Sgt. H. A. White, Tank Corps (Reading)
- Sgt. H. Whitfield, Yorkshire Reg. (Sledmere)
- Air Mechanic Sergeant Major F. Whittaker, Tank Corps (Manchester)
- Sgt. F. Whittaker, Royal Field Arty. (Sowerby Bridge, Yorkshire)
- Sgt. T. Whitton, Machine Gun Corps (Edinburgh)
- C.S. Maj. J. Wicken, Royal West Kent Reg. (North Woolwich)
- Sgt. H. G. Wickington, East Kent Reg. (Haggerston, London)
- Sgt. P. Wicks, Royal Horse Arty. (Wellhall, London)
- Cpl. A. Widdowson, Royal Field Arty. (E. Wakefield)
- Sgt. L. C. Wildig, Royal Field Arty. (Bethnal Green, London)
- R.S. Maj. A. Wileman, North Lancashire Reg.
- Sgt. J. Wilkinson, East Lancashire Reg. (Burnley)
- C.S. Maj. W. S. Wilkinson, West Riding Reg. (Holmfirth, Huddersfield)
- C.S. Maj. E. G.Williams, Duke of Cornwall's Light Inf. (Brixton)
- Cpl. F. Williams, North Lancashire Reg. (Horwich)
- L. Cpl. F. Williams, Royal Engineers (Manchester)
- L. Sgt. I. Williams, Welsh Reg. (Bridgend)
- C.Q.M.S. P. Williams, Royal Munster Fusiliers (Abertndwr)
- Cpl. S. A. Williams, Royal Engineers (Smethwick)
- Sgt. W. T. Williams, Middlesex Reg. (Hornsey, London)
- L. Cpl. H. Willicombe, Rifle Brigade (Camberwell)
- Dvr. A. A. Willis, Royal Garrison Arty. (Apperley, near Tewkesbury)
- B.Q.M. Sgt. J. Willis, Royal Garrison Arty. (Kensington)
- Sgt. H. Willmer, Royal Garrison Arty. (Homerton, London)
- Sgt. W. Willows, West Riding Reg. (Colne)
- L. Sgt. H. Wilshaw, Nottinghamshire and Derbyshire Reg. (Chapel-en-le-Frith)
- Sgt. A. P. Wilson, Bedfordshire Reg. (Luton)
- R.S. Maj. J. W. Windmill, Royal Warwickshire Reg. (Brierley Hill)
- Cpl. H. Withers, Royal Field Arty. (Muswell Hill, London)
- Sgt. A. Wood, Essex Reg. (Warley)
- Cpl. H. Wood, Royal Field Arty.
- C.S. Maj. H. C. Woodger, East Lancashire Reg. (Banning, Kent)
- Sgt. H. Woodhams, East Kent Reg. (Northampton)
- Battery Sergeant Major E. Woodruff, Royal Field Arty. (Blackburn)
- Cpl. F. Woode, Royal Engineers (Maidenhead, Bucks)
- Battery Sergeant Major J. H. Woods, Royal Field Arty. (Battersea)
- Sgt. C. E. K. Wordingham, Suffolk Reg. (Railway, Cambs)
- Fitter Q.M.S. J. W.Worth, Royal Field Arty. (Newcastle upon Tyne)
- Sgt. F. E. Wright, Royal Engineers (Darlington)
- Cpl. F. W. Wright, Royal Scots (Edinburgh)
- Sgt. W. J. Wright, Royal Field Arty. (Pembroke)
- C.S. Maj. T. G. Yearsley, Monmouthshire Reg. (Aberearn, Mon.)
- Sgt. W. H. Zanazi, Royal Engineers (Plymouth)
- Sgt. J. R. Adamson, Yorkshire Reg. (East Rainton)
- Petty Ofc. J. Allan, Royal Naval Volunteer Reserve (Annitsford)
- Act. Bombr. S. A. Blyth, Royal Garrison Arty. (Melton, Norfolk)
- 2nd Cpl. F. Bownas, Royal Engineers (E. Bradford)
- L. Cpl. L. J. Burden, Tank Corps (Bridgtown)
- Sgt. A. Cole, South Wales Borderers (Withington Station, near Hereford)
- L. Cpl. M. Dixon, Shropshire Light Inf. (Gelli, Rhondda)
- Battery Sergeant Major F. W. H. Eastley, Royal Garrison Arty. (Southampton)
- Spr. W. J. Feeman, Royal Engineers (Liverpool)
- R.S. Maj. A. Ferrier, Royal Highlanders (Perth)
- Cpl. F. Fisher, Royal Field Arty. (Wetley, Hampshire)
- Cpl. G. C. Gane, Somerset Light Inf. (Shepton Mallet)
- Spr. W. I. Garner, Royal Engineers (Bletchley)
- C.S. Maj. E. Hall, Middlesex Reg. (Preston, Lancaster)
- L. Cpl. G. Hardie, Royal Engineers (Glasgow)
- Spr. R. Harrison, Royal Engineers (Notting Hill)
- Sgt. R. Harrop, Nottinghamshire and Derbyshire Reg. (Worksop)
- Dvr. H. Henthorn, Royal Field Arty. (Oldham)
- Cpl. G. Hindle, East Lancashire Reg. (Preston)
- L. Sgt. W. W. Hogben, Royal Welsh Fusiliers (Portsmouth)
- C.S. Maj. E. Irving, Coldstream Guards (Walworth, London)
- C.Q.M.S. I. Jacks, Royal Munster Fusiliers (Leeds)
- Act. Cpl. F. G. Jones, Duke of Cornwall's Light Inf. (Plaistow)
- C.S. Maj. H. Larkman, Essex Reg. (Norwich)
- Sgt. L. T. Marsom, Military Mounted Police (Biggleswade, Bedford)
- Sgt. J. McIntosh, Gordon Highlanders (Aberdeen)
- Sgt. S. S. Morris, Royal Engineers (Stafford)
- Pte. H. R. Periam, Machine Gun Corps (Romford, London)
- Sgt. A. Roberts, Yorkshire Light Inf. (Talywain, Pontypool, Mon.)
- L. Cpl. I. Scott, Royal Engineers (Liverpool)
- Sgt. J. V. Solari, Nottinghamshire and Derbyshire Reg., attd. Machine Gun Corps
- Battery Sergeant Major H. F. Spratley, Royal Garrison Arty. (Paddington, London)
- R.S. Maj. A. Utton, East Yorkshire Reg. (Hull)
- Clr.Sergeant G. Vyse, East Yorkshire Reg.
- C.S. Maj. C. F. Walker, Bedfordshire Reg. (Hitchin)
- C.Q.M.S. H. G. Wickington, East Kent Reg. (Haggerston, London)
- Sgt. P. J. Wicks, Royal Horse Arty. (Wellhall, London)
- L. Cpl. F. E. Wright, Royal Engineers (Darlington)

==== Australian Imperial Force ====
- Pte. A. J. Breen, Inf.
- Tmp Cpl. B. W. Rickwo, Inf.
- E. H. Wiber, T.M. Brigade
- Sgt. E. A. W. Adams, Inf.
- C.S. Maj. A. E. Adams, Inf.
- Sgt. V. J. Barkell, Inf.
- Spr. E. L. Barrett, Engineers
- Pte. T. Bayne, Inf.
- Pte. H. Beaird, Inf.
- Sgt. D. F. Berman, Inf.
- V. Berriman, Arty.
- Cpl. L. Berry, Inf.
- Sgt. J. R. Birthisel, Inf.
- Pte. S. H. Brazil, Inf.
- Pte. J. A. Breen, Inf.
- Gnr. D. G. Brough, Field Arty.
- Sgt. J. R. Butler, Inf.
- Sgt. R. A. F. Campbell, Inf.
- C.S. Maj. H. M. Cook, Inf.
- Cpl. H. F. Eagle, Field Arty.
- Sgt. A. W. Farmer, Inf.
- Sgt. R. P. Farris, Inf.
- Cpl. A. Flavell, Inf.
- Sgt. S. Fountain, Engineers
- Sgt. C. E. Free, Inf.
- R.S. Maj. R. Gray, Inf.
- Sgt. L. G. Howe, Engineers
- Sgt. L. G. Jarvis, Inf.
- Sgt. J. H. Leach, Inf.
- 2nd Cpl. L. T. J. Marshall, Engineers
- Sgt. Major A. E. McDonald, Field Arty.
- Staff Sergeant A. V. D. Moody, Engineers
- 2nd Cpl. J. L. Mounsey, Eng
- Sgt. B. F. Murphy, Inf.
- Sgt. D. T. W. Neville, Inf.
- L. Cpl. F. J. Perry, Inf.
- Cpl. J. Printer, Salvage Company
- Cpl. T. G. Purdue, Gar. Arty.
- L. Cpl. J. Reilly, Inf.
- Bombr. W. H. Ramsden, Field Arty.
- Tmp Cpl. W. B. Rickwood, Inf.
- Sgt. H. Shatwell, Inf.
- Pte. T. Smith, Inf.
- Sgt. G. Taylor, Pioneer Battalion
- Spr. R. G. Thomas, Engineers
- Sgt. F. T. Trevaskis, Pioneer Battalion
- R.S. Maj. A. J. Vallis, Inf.
- C.Q.M.S. F. Walker, Machine Gun Corps
- Cpl. C. G. Watson, Inf.
- L. Sgt. F. A. Wheaton, Inf.
- Cpl. H. E. Wiber, T. M. Brigade
- Pte. J. D. Walks, Army Medical Corps
- C.S. Maj. S. Wilson, Inf.

==== Canadian Force ====
- Sgt. P. H. Law, Field Arty.
- C.S. Maj. H. Adam, Inf.
- Cpl. J. D. Aird, Mounted Rifles
- C.S. Maj. C. Baker, Inf.
- Sgt. W. J. Bassey, Inf.
- Sgt. H. M. Bennett, Engineers
- C.S. Maj. R. Blair, Inf.
- C.S. Maj. F. J. Bonner, Inf.
- Sgt. E. J. Bridgwater, Engineers
- Cpl. J. Bullock, Inf.
- Sgt. J. Burns, Inf.
- C.S. Maj. H. T. Carter, Inf.
- Sgt. C. L. Cooling, Engineers
- Sgt. J. Craig, Engineers
- R.S. Maj. R. Dalrymple, Inf.
- Bombr. F. Donald, Gar. Arty.
- Sgt. T. A. Dunseath, Inf.
- Act. C.S. Maj. G. W. Durran, Inf.
- Sgt. E. Ensor, Inf.
- C.S. Maj. E. Evans, Inf.
- Battery Sergeant Major S. C. Evans, Arty.
- Sgt. E. J. Field, Inf.
- Sgt. A. H. Frame, Field Arty.
- Sgt. J. Goulding, Railway Troops
- Pte. J. H. Gulliver, Inf.
- Sgt. J. M. Hay, Machine Gun Corps
- Spr. J. W. Holmes, Engineers
- C.S. Maj. G. L. Howard, Mounted Rifles
- R.S. Maj. W. T. Johnson, Inf.
- B.Q.M. Sgt. D. McN. Johnstone, Inf.
- Sgt. A. J. Kirouac, Inf.
- Act. Sgt. H. W. Langdon, Inf.
- Sgt. P. H. Law, Field Arty.
- Sgt. J. N. Lyons, Gar. Arty.
- C.S. Maj. A. MacAlay, Inf.
- Battalion Scout Sergeant J. L. MacCoubrey, Mounted Rifles
- L. Cpl. J. Mackay, Inf.
- Battery Sergeant Major A. K. McDonald, Field Arty.
- Sgt. W. L. McLean, Mounted Rifles
- Sgt. D. McLellan, Pioneer Battalion
- L. Cpl. W. J. Mead, Mounted Rifles
- T. P. Melvin, Field Arty.
- Sgt. W. A. Millen, Inf.
- Cpl. H. L. Montgomery, Cyclist Battalion
- Sgt. T. W. Morgan, Inf.
- Pte. W. R. Mowll, Inf.
- C.S. Maj. J. Mutimer, Inf.
- Sgt. C. H. Olson, Railway Troops
- C.S. Maj. J. H. Patton, Machine Gun Corps
- Sgt. W. L. Paul, Inf.
- Cpl. C. E. Penrod, Field Arty.
- Sgt. A. Powell, Engineers
- C.S. Maj. D. M. Robinson, Inf.
- C.S. Maj. J. Shefly, Inf
- Sgt. Warrant Ofc. Simpson, Engineers
- Sgt. W. D. Street, Inf.
- Pte. R. Taylor, Machine Gun Corps
- Sgt. Major J. Turner, Army Medical Corps
- Sgt. J. A. Ware, Gar. Arty.
- Sgt. J. Watson, Army Medical Corps
- C.S. Maj. J. H. Wyatt, Inf.
- Sgt. G. M. Young, Inf.

==== New Zealand Force ====
- Pte. N. D. Bowman, Inf.
- Cpl. W. W. Bullock, Inf.
- Pte. V. Cruickshank, Inf.
- L. Sgt. J. Densem, Rifle Brigade
- Gnr. A. S. Driver, Field Arty.
- Sgt. F. Greig, Field Arty.
- R.S. Maj. W. A. Gustafson, Pioneers
- L. Sgt. S. N. Managh, Rifle Brigade
- Sgt. J. McCreanor, Inf.
- Cpl. K. McKenzie, Inf.
- Sgt. A. W. M. Ohlson, Rifle Brigade
- Sgt. H. W. Price, Machine Gun Corps
- L. Cpl. L. R. Ritchie, Inf.
- Dvr. S. Wade, Field Arty.

==== Newfoundland Contingent ====
- C.S. Maj. A. Taylor, Newfoundland Reg.

==== South African Force ====
- Bombr. E. C. Tys, Royal Marine Arty.

=== Indian Order of Merit (IOM) ===
Second Class

- Lance Dafadar Anokh Singh, Cav.
- Dafadar Puran Singh, Cav.

=== Indian Distinguished Service Medal (IDSM) ===
- Dvr. Alia Dad, Royal Horse Arty.
- Dvr. Lehna Singh, Royal Horse Arty.
- Sowar Man Singh Cav.
- Sowar Mool Singh, Cav.
- Dafadar Bhoor Singh, Cav.
- Lance Dafadar Ali Hassan, Cav.
- Dafadar Atta Muhammad Khan, Cav.
- Act. Lee Dafadar Sobha Singh, Cav.
- Sowar Rati Ram, Cav.
- Risaldar Khurshed Muhammad Khan, Cav.
- Act. Dafadar Parbhu Dayal, Cav.
- Sowar Jaimal Singh, Cav.
- Lance Dafadar Niadar Singh, Cav.
- Jemadar Kale Khan, Cav.
- Risaldar Tek Singh, Cav.
- Jemadar Habib Gul, Cav.
- Jemadar Sardar Khan, Cav.
- Dafadar Abdul Satar Khan, Cav.
- Lance Dafadar Nawab All Khan, Cav.
- Sowar Sarain Singh, Cav.
- Dafadar Sangar Khan, Cav.
- Sowar Fauja Singh, Cav.
- Jemadar Alam Sher, Cav.
- Jemadar Adalat Khan, Cav.
- Jemadar Khuda Baksh Khan, Cav.
- Dafadar Alia Ditta Khan, Cav.
- Sowar Muhammad Jan, Cav.
- Act. Lance Dafadar Bur Singh, Cav.
- Act. Lance Dafadar Musali Khan, Cav.
- Dafadar Ram Sarup, Cav.
- Sowar Mir Ronak All, Cav.
- Sowar Autar Singh, Cav. Ward Ordly
- Mahmud Ali Khan, Cav.
- Sowar Asta Buddin, Cav. Ressalder Balwant Singh, Cav.
- Dafadar Abdur Rahim Khan, Cav.
- Dafadar Dale Ram, Cav.
- Dafadar Pirthi Singh, Cav. Jemadar Anno Khan, Cav.
- Jemadar Taj Muhammad Khan, Cav.
- Dafadar Sher Bahadur Khan, Cav.
- Dafadar Jehan Khan, Cav.
- Lance Dafadar Akram Khan, Cav.
- Dafadar Khandara Singh, Cav.
- Dafadar Labh Singh, Cav.
- Act. Lee. Dafadar Arjan Singh, Cav.
- Sowar Nand Singh, Cav.
- Havildar Kala Singh, Royal Garrison Arty., Indian Army
- Ward Ordly. Umrao Singh, Inf.
- 1st Grade Hospital Store Keeper Rup Chand Khana, Supply and Transport Corps
- Sub. Asst Surg Parmanand Misra, Indian Sub. Medical Service
- 1st Class Sub. Asst Surg George Julian Ferris, Indian Sub. Medical Service
- 1st Class Sub Asst Surgeon Ram Lai Abrole, Indian Sub. Medical Service
- Lance Havildar Budhoo, Army Bearer Corps
- Bearer Binda, Army Bearer Corps

=== King's Police Medal (KPM) ===
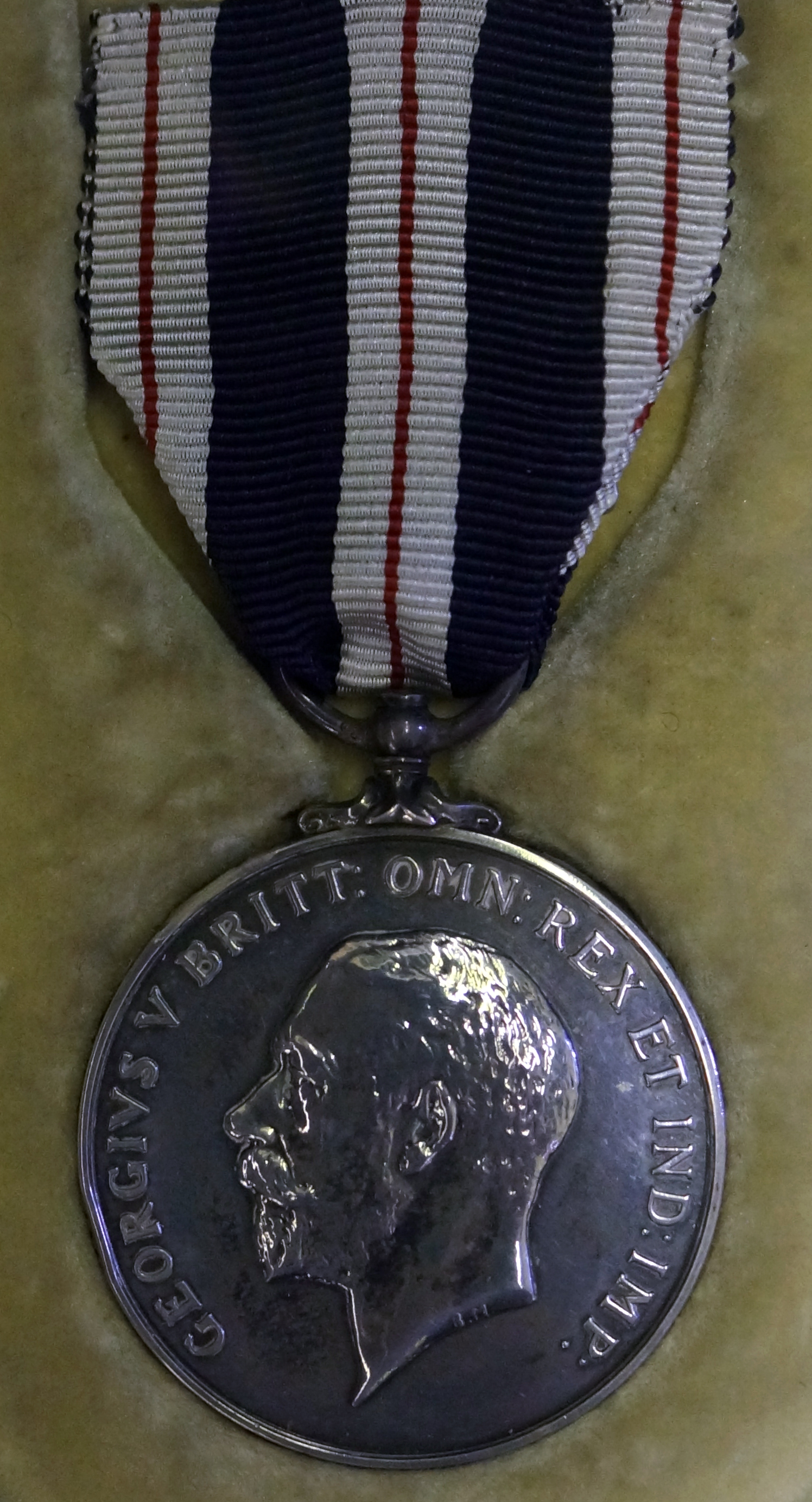
King's Police Medal with the riband for gallantry

==== England and Wales ====
===== Police Forces =====
- Lt.-Col. The Hon. George Augustus Anson MVO Chief Constable of Staffordshire
- George Morley, Chief Constable of Hull
- James Anniwell, Superintendent and Deputy Chief Constable of the Bedfordshire Constabulary
- Henry Hand, Superintendent and Deputy Chief Constable of the Breconshire Police
- Superintendent John H. Gillbanks, of the Somersetshire Police
- Superintendent Patrick Quinn MVO of the Metropolitan Police Force
- Sgt. Staple, of the Somersetshire Police Force
- Constable Alfred Bence, of the Metropolitan Police Force
- Constable Herbert Bradbury, of the Lancashire Constabulary
- Constable Charles Dednum, of the Metropolitan Police Force
- Constable James Hardacre, of the Lancashire Constabulary
- Constable James Hardy, of the Metropolitan Police Force
- Constable John Nelson Kent, of the Blackpool Police Force
- Constable Ambrose Jolleys, of the Lancashire Constabulary
- Constable Matthew Landy, of the Metropolitan Police Force
- Constable George Legrove, of the City of London Police Force
- Constable Charles Penn, of the Metropolitan Police Force
- Constable Augustus Ralph, of the Metropolitan Police Force
- Constable Robert George Wilson, of the Metropolitan Police Force

===== Fire Brigades =====
- Chief Ofc. Edward James Abbott, of the Barking Fire Brigade
- Fireman James Joseph Betts, West Ham Fire Brigade
- Station Ofc. Samuel Scott Betts, West Ham Fire Brigade
- Fireman Henry Chappie, West Ham Fire Brigade
- Sub-Ofc. Landias Mathunn, West Ham Fire Brigade
- First-Class Fireman Ernest Milsted, West Ham Fire Brigade
- Fireman Frederick Charles Sell, West Ham Fire Brigade
- Fireman James Henry Rich Yabsley, West Ham Fire Brigade
- Sub-Ofc. Henry Vickers, West Ham Fire Brigade

==== Scotland ====
===== Police Forces =====
- Constable William Tair Brown, of the Glasgow City Police Force
- Charles George, Chief Constable of Kincardine

===== Fire Brigades =====
- Firemaster William Inkster, of the City of Aberdeen

==== Ireland ====
===== Police Forces =====
- Robert John O'Sullivan, Acting Sergeant of the Royal Irish Constabulary
- John Fitzhugh Gelston, County Inspector of the Royal Irish Constabulary
- Fergus Quinn, Assistant Comm., Dublin Metropolitan Police
- William P. Bannon, Superintendent of the Dublin Metropolitan Police
- Sgt. James Gunn, of the Royal Irish Constabulary
- Constable Michael Barry, of the Royal Irish Constabulary
- Constable Daniel Brennan, of the Dublin Metropolitan Police
- Constable Patrick Downing, of the Dublin Metropolitan Police
- Constable Alexander McDonald, of the Royal Irish Constabulary

===== Awarded a Bar to the King's Police Medal =====
- Sgt. John Barton, of the Dublin Metropolitan Police

==== British India ====
===== Police Forces =====
- Walter Henry Wright, Assistant Superintendent of Police, Madras Police
- Golla Simhachellam, Sub-Inspector of Police, Godavari district, Madras Police
- Abdul Aziz Sahib, Inspector of Police, Godavari district, Madras Police
- Nandi Kishora Padhi, Inspector of Police, Vizagapatam district, Madras Police
- Roy Havelock Haslam, Assistant Superintendent, Agency Police, Kathiawar, Bombay Police
- Rajabkhan Daudkhan, Fourth Grade Head Constable in the Kaira District Police, Bombay Police
- Peter Sullivan, Superintendent of the Criminal Investigation Dept., Bombay City Police
- Abdul Satar Khan walad Sobdar Khan, Inspector of Police, Fourth Grade, Karachi District (acting Third Grade), Bombay Police
- MalayActing Ganpat, Acting Second Grade Inspector of Police in the Poona District, Bombay Police
- Khan Saheb Imam Muhammad, a Third Grade Inspector of Police, Criminal Investigation Dept., Bombay Presidency
- Gerald Sidney Wilson, Deputy Comm. of Police for the part of Bombay
- Ganu Dhansrng, a Second Grade Head Constable, District East Khandesh (retired)
- Nalini Nath Mazumdar, Inspector, Calcutta Police, Bengial Police
- Sashi Bhusan Bhattacharji, Inspector of Police, Bengal
- Rajemdra Nath Basu, Inspector of Police, Bengal
- Narendra Nath Mukharji, Sub-Inspector of Police, Bengal
- Jamir Khan, Constable, Bengal Police
- Robert Martin Wright, Superintendent of Police, Bengal
- Amrita Lai Singh, Head Constable, Calcutta Police
- Azam Khan, Head Constable, Bengal Police
- Ram Sakal Gosain, Head Constable, Bengal Police
- Jogendra Chandra Gupta, Sub-Inspector of Police, Intelligence Branch, Criminal Investigation Dept., Bengal Police
- Ala Ahmad, Constable of the Budaun district, United Provinces Police
- Bhagwant Singh, Sub-Inspector, Station Ofc. of Islamnagarthana, Budaun District, United Provinces Police
- Muhammad Khan, Constable of the Kheri district, United Provinces Police
- George Grosvenor Bruce Iver, Superintendent of Police, Jheilum district, Punjab Police
- Mohammad Rashid, Head Constable, Ferozepore district, Punjab Police
- Haider Ali, Sub-Inspector, Ludhiana district, Punjab Police
- Faiz-ul-Hassan, Sub-Inspector, Punjab Police
- Mirza Muraj-ud-Din, Inspector, Punjab Police
- Malcolm James Chisholm, Deputy Inspector-General of Police for Railways and Criminal Investigation, Burma Civil Police
- Charles Arthur Reynell, District Superintendent of Police Henzada, Burma Civil Police
- Sita Ram, Deputy Superintendent of Police, Burma Civil Police
- Maung Kyaung Ba Inspector of Police (retired), Burma Civil Police
- Pahalman Chettri, 1st Grade Jemadar, Arakan Hill Tracts Military Police Battalion, Burma Military Police
- Arratoon Catchick, Deputy Superintendent of Police, Officiating District Superintendent of Police, Kathia, Burma Civil Police
- Henry St. John Morrison, Deputy Superintendent of Police, Bihar and Orissa, Civil Police
- Swarup Narayan Singh, Jamadar, Military Police Company, Bhagalpur, Bihar and Orissa Military Police
- Khwaja Muhammad Akram Khan, Deputy Superintendent, Central Provinces Police
- Singfair Gharti, Subadar Lushai Hills Military Police Battalion, Assam Military Police
- Khan Sahib Helimulla, Officiating Deputy Superintendent of Police, Sylhet district, Assam Civil Police
- Jangbir Lama, Subadar, Lakhimpur Military Police Battalion, Assam Military Police
- Eric Charles Handyside, Superintendent of Police, 4th Grade, North-West Frontier Province Police
- Zabhir Gul Khan, Inspector, 4th grade, North-West Frontier Province Police
- Malik Mazaffar Khan, Inspector, 3rd grade, North-West Frontier Province Police
- Thomas Henry Morony, District Superintendent of Police, 4th grade, Indian Police (Indore State Police)
- Samuel Thomas Hollins, Superintendent of Police, 5th grade, Inspector-General of Tonk State Police
- Adalat Khan, Head Constable, Baluchistan Police
- Ernest Woodburn Trotter, District Superintendent, Burma Civil Police
- Reginald Charles Whiting, District Superintendent, Burma Civil Police

==== Overseas Dominions ====
===== Police Forces =====
- James Frendo Azopardi MVO Senior Assistant Superintendent of Police, Malta
- William Kilmuster Notley, Comm. of Police, East Africa Protectorate
- Lt.-Col. Charles Riddick, Comm. of Police and Prisons, Uganda Protectorate
- Robert Evans Lett, Staff Instructor, Gold Coast Police
- Col. William Eden Clark, Inspector-General of Police and Commandant of local forces, British Guiana

=== Imperial Service Medal (ISM) ===
==== Home Civil Service ====
- William Addis, Overseer, London Postal Service
- Walter Alfred Barnes, First Class Messenger, Treasury
- Frederick John Bayfield, Detail Plotter, Publication Division, Ordnance Survey, Southampton
- George Bennett, Postman, Mitcham
- Alfred Biffen, Overseer, London Postal Service
- John Blackwood, Postman, Kinross
- William Thomas Blake, Foreman, Army Ordnance Dept., Woolwich
- Samuel Francis Boden, Postman, Birmingham
- Owen Sylvester Bond, Shipwright, Portsmouth Dockyard
- Frederick William Bucknell, Overseer (Telegraphs), London Postal Service
- Valentine Pike Burbidge, Assistant Head Postman, London Postal Service
- Alma Ephraim Austin Burden, Second Class Draughtsman (Overseer), Portsmouth Dockyard
- James Burke, Preventive Ofc., Liverpool
- Francis Burns, Postman, Portadown
- Thomas Butland, Assistant Inspector of Postmen, Torquay
- John Butler, Leading Man of Wharf, Royal Clarence Yard, Gosport
- William Woodward Butler, Postman, Ganstead, S.O. Hull
- Duncan Urquhart Brown, First Engineer (Yardcraft), Portsmouth Dockyard
- Alfred John Carter, Assistant Inspector of Postmen, Exeter
- John Caryl, Postman, Cowley SO., Exeter
- George Chadwick, Assistant London Postal Service Head Postman
- Benjamin Walter Samuel Chambers, Telegraphist, Central Telegraph Office
- Richard William Chapman, Sorting Clerk and Telegraphist, Leeds
- Christopher Byatt Comben, Warder, Portland Prison
- Ellen Cooke, Matron, Class IV, Shrewsbury Prison
- Richard John Cooper, Principal Warder, Portland Prison
- Thomas John Cooper, Patternmaker, Chatham Dockyard
- James Crone, Chief Worktaker, Central Office, Ministry of Munitions
- Stephen Richard Davey, Shipwright, Devon-port Dockyard
- Emily Rosa Davies, Assistant Supervisor, Class II, Central Telegraph Office
- Ernest John Edward Davis, Postman, Portsmouth
- John Dixon, Postman, Preston
- Frederick William Drew, Examiner of Drawings, Control Division, Ordnance Survey, Southampton
- Joseph Drinkwater, Postman, Gloucester
- William Berry Dyson, Assistant Inspector of Postmen, Huddersfield
- James Farrar, Assistant Inspector, Post Office, Blackburn
- Arthur Fewell, Assistant Inspector, Post Office, Sutton
- William Gamwell, Postman, Northallerton
- William Garwood, Stamper, Office of Inspector of Stamping, Inland Revenue
- James Richard Ernest Gaston, Postman, London Postal Service
- Giovanni Gatt, Foreman of Stores, Naval Store Dept., Admiralty
- Andrew Gibson, Postman, Belfast
- William Grave, Overseer (Postal), Liverpool
- Richard Horatio Green, Assistant Inspector of Tracing, Accountant-General's Dept., General Post Office
- George Edward Harris, Postman, Harlow
- George Harvey, Postman, Gloucester
- William John Head, Second Class Storerman, Stores Dept., General Post Office
- James Heard, Shipwright, Chatham Dockyard
- Thomas Hennessy, Postman, Kildare, Newbridge, Ireland
- Charles Samuel Hill, Mate in charge of War Dept. Vessels, War Office
- William Sycamore Hill, Postman, Sutton
- Jessie Eliza Housden, Sorting Clerk and Telegraphist, Wimborne
- Joseph Hudson, Postman, Warwick
- Gabriel Hughes, Inspector of Messengers, Central Telegraph Office
- Edward Jones, Postman, Liverpool
- Robert Jones, Shipwright, Pembroke Dockyard
- Edwin James Lake, Skilled Labourer, Portsmouth Dockyard
- Robert Lawson, Postman, Glasgow
- William Thomas Leonard, Postman, Rochdale
- Mary Elizabeth Liddle, Assistant Supervisor, Post Office, Carlisle
- George William Lock, Telegraphist, Central Telegraph Office
- Mary Lomax, Sorting Clerk and Telegraphist, Manchester
- George William Long, Sorting Clerk and Telegraphist, Boston
- Henry Lord, Preventive Ofc., Sunderland
- Edward Lovell, Postman, Eastbourne
- Andrew Low, Inspector of Storehousemen, Chatham Dockyard
- Patrick M'Donnell, Postman, Slane, Drogheda
- James M'Geoch, Inspector, Engineering Dept., General Post Office
- Daniel M'llgorm, Customs and Excise Ofc., Holyhead, Carnarvon
- Arthur Samuel Madge, Sorter, London Postal Service
- William Mash, Rigger (Chargeman), Sheerness Dockyard
- Walter Mason, Paper-Keeper, Money Order Dept., General Post Office
- David Millar, Postman, Coatbridge
- James Nelson, Postman, Crossgar, Belfast
- William Newburn, Shipwright, Chatham Dockyard
- William Noot, Shipwright, Pembroke Dockyard
- William Parsons, Warder, Grade I, Brixton Prison
- Charles Henry Penrose, Ship Fitter, Devonport Dockyard
- Harry Perks, Assistant Inspector of Postmen, Buxton
- Thomas Reekie, Postman, Auchtermuchty, Ladybank
- Arthur James Richards, Fitter, Chatham Dockyard
- Ralph Robinson, Overseer, Post Office, Stockton-on-Tees
- Alfred Robert Rose, Sorter, London Postal Service
- John Sandham, Postman, Fleetwood
- Elizabeth Scowcroft, Telegraphist, Central Telegraph Office
- William Kinnear Shannon, Postman, Dundee
- Edna Jane Sharpe, Matron, Class I, Leeds Prison
- William Shearman, Postman, York
- Margaret Sheret, Counter Clerk and Telegraphist, London Postal Service
- George Sinclair, Head Office Keeper and House Keeper, Foreign Office
- Charles Smith, Postman, London Postal Service
- George Henry Smith, Shipwright, Devonport Dockyard
- William Stewart, Skilled Labourer, Devonport Dockyard
- Robert Scott Taylor, Labourer, Leeds Prison
- Robert Tillett, Shipwright, Portsmouth Dockyard
- John Thomas Tozer, Skilled Labourer, Devonport Dockyard
- William Richard Upjohn, Postman, Lyme Regis, S.O. Axminster
- William Wardrop, Foreman, Engineering Dept., General Post Office
- Frances Mary Isabella Webber, Assistant Supervisor (Telegraphs), Bath
- Charles Arthur Wells, Examiner of Tracings, Control Division, Ordnance Survey, Southampton
- Alfred George White, Sorter, London Postal Service
- Henry James Whittle, Telegraphist, Central Telegraph Office
- Edward Whitwell, Postman, Kendal
- Joseph William Wickenden, Skilled Labourer, Sheerness Dockyard
- Alfred John Wilkins, Photographic Writer, Publication Division, Ordnance Survey, Southampton
- Edwin Williams, Ship Fitter, Chargeman, Devonport Dockyard
