= Woodroffe =

Woodroffe is a surname. Notable people with the name include:

- Woodroffe (Surrey cricketer), English cricket player (first name unknown)
- Alison Broinowski (née Woodroffe), Australian academic, journalist, writer and former diplomat
- Colin Woodroffe, Australian geographer and geomorphologist
- John Woodroffe, British Orientalist
- Kenneth Woodroffe (1892–1915), English cricketer and soldier
- Martyn Woodroffe, Welsh swimmer who won a Silver medal at the 1968 Olympic Games
- Sir Nicholas Woodroffe, Lord Mayor of London in the Elizabethan period
- Patricia Woodroffe, New Zealand fencer
- Patrick Woodroffe, English artist, specialising in fantasy & science-fiction artwork
- Paul Woodroffe, British illustrator and stained glass artist
- Sidney Clayton Woodroffe, British V.C. awardee (World War I)

== See also ==
- Mount Woodroffe, a mountain in South Australia
- Woodroffe, Northern Territory, a suburb of Darwin, Australia
- Woodroffe Avenue, a road in Ottawa, Ontario, Canada
- Woodroffe North, a neighbourhood in Ottawa
- Woodroofe (surname), a similarly spelled surname
- Woodruff (surname), a similarly spelled surname
