= Woodrooffe =

Woodrooffe is a surname. Notable people with the surname include:

- Anne Woodrooffe (1766–?), 19th-century British author
- Thomas Woodrooffe (1899–1978), British naval officer, broadcaster, and writer

== See also ==
- Woodroffe
- Woodroofe (surname)
