= Swansea Pals =

14th (Service) Battalion, Welsh Regiment (Swansea)
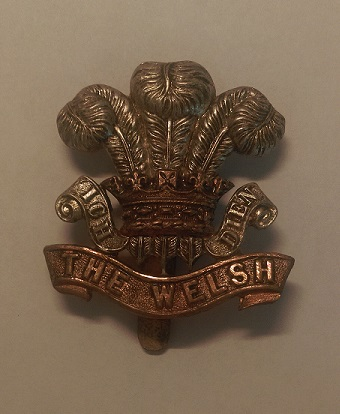
- Cap badge of the Welsh Regiment
- Active: 17 September 1914–30 May 1919
- Allegiance: United Kingdom
- Branch: New Army
- Type: Pals battalion
- Role: Infantry
- Size: One Battalion
- Part of: 38th (Welsh) Division
- Garrison/HQ: Swansea
- Nickname: Swansea Pals
- Patron: Mayor and Corporation of Swansea
- Engagements: Battle of the Somme; Third Battle of Ypres; Hundred Days Offensive

The Swansea Pals, later the 14th (Service) Battalion, Welsh Regiment (Swansea) ('14th Welsh') was a Welsh infantry unit recruited from Swansea in World War I as part of 'Kitchener's Army'. It served in 38th (Welsh) Division and took part in the division's costly attack on Mametz Wood during the Battle of the Somme. The battalion continued serving on the Western Front for the rest of the war, including the Third Battle of Ypres and the final Hundred Days Offensive.

== Recruitment ==
Alfred Leete's recruitment poster for Kitchener's Army.

On 6 August 1914, less than 48 hours after Britain's declaration of war, Parliament sanctioned an increase of 500,000 men for the Regular British Army, and the newly appointed Secretary of State for War, Earl Kitchener of Khartoum issued his famous call to arms: 'Your King and Country Need You', urging the first 100,000 volunteers to come forward. This group of six divisions with supporting arms became known as Kitchener's First New Army, or 'K1'. K2, K3 and K4 followed shortly afterwards. However, these were soon joined by groups of men from particular localities or backgrounds who wished to serve together. Starting in London and Liverpool, the phenomenon of 'Pals battalions' quickly spread across the country, as local recruiting committees offered complete units to the War Office (WO), which constituted the Fifth New Army (K5).

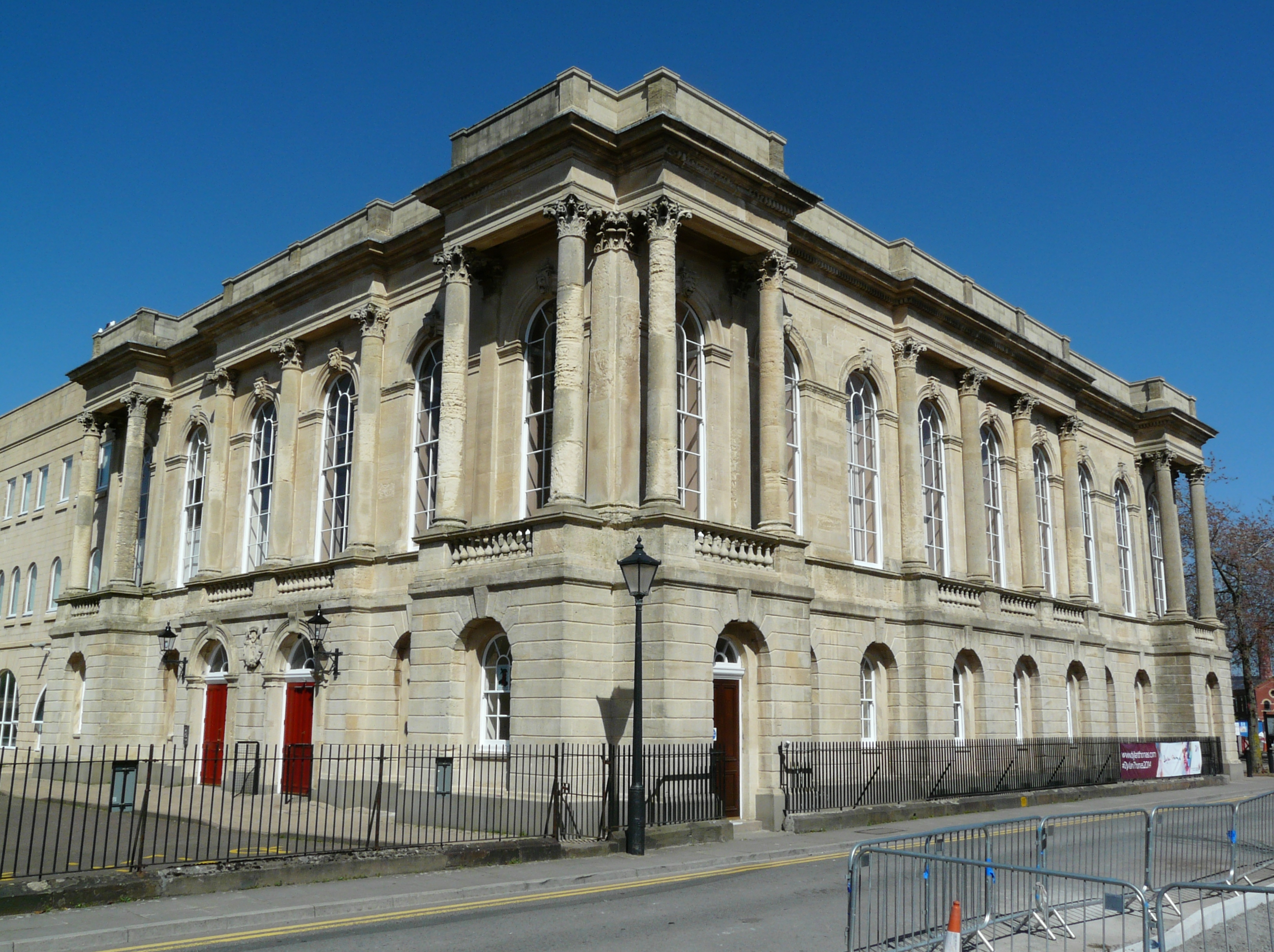
The old Swansea Guildhall (now the Dylan Thomas Centre) where the first Swansea Pals were enlisted.

Immediately after the outbreak of war, Alderman T.T. Corker, the Mayor of Swansea in South Wales, proposed to form a home defence force or 'Civic Guard' to protect local industry and infrastructure such as railways and docks when the local Territorial Force battalion, the 6th Welsh Regiment, left the town for active service. One such volunteer unit began to be organised as early as 13 August by the Swansea Football and Cricket Club, which formed a Club Training Corps and established a rifle range under the grandstand of St Helen's Rugby and Cricket Ground. It soon numbered over 100 men. However, the mayor was advised that the creation of home based units was not a priority for the WO (although the Volunteer Training Corps was organised nationally as the war progressed). The mayor and corporation then turned their attention to assisting 'Kitchener's Army'. Two prominent local businessmen, Sir Alfred Mond of the Mond Nickel Refinery, and F. Cory Yeo of the Graigola Colliery, both based at Clydach, independently offered funds to raise a battalion in Swansea, and on 16 September the mayor held a public meeting at the town's Albert Hall. This meeting enthusiastically agreed to form a Swansea battalion of the Welsh Regiment. (Note: Although the regiment preferred the spelling 'Welch', this was not officially accepted until 1921.) The WO promptly accepted the offer and advertisements and further public meetings publicised the new unit, whose recruits were invited to enlist at Swansea Guildhall. By 25 September over 274 volunteers had signed up including the nucleus from the Swansea Training Corps. They were being drilled at St Helen's cricket ground, while the recruiting office had moved to the better suited Mond Buildings in Union Street. Major Henry Benson, DSO, a retired officer of the East Surrey Regiment who had family connections with Swansea, was appointed as the battalion's first commanding officer (CO) with the rank of Lieutenant-Colonel. Dyson Brock Williams, a prominent Swansea resident and member of the cricket club, who had been involved in recruiting the battalion, became Captain and adjutant, and was promoted to Temporary Major in May 1915. Another early officer was the Mayor's son, Llewellyn Corker, who had initially enlisted as a Trooper in the Glamorgan Yeomanry but was now commissioned as a 2nd Lieutenant in the Swansea Battalion.

Another meeting, held at Cardiff under the chairmanship of David Lloyd George on 28 September, led to the formation of the 'Welsh National Executive Committee' (WNEC), which proposed to raise a complete Welsh Army Corps of two divisions. This proposal was authorised by the WO on 10 October, and the Swansea Pals became part of this larger effort. However, the initial surge of volunteers was already receding: by mid-October the Swansea battalion had reached a strength of 436 but further recruitment efforts would be needed to bring it up to the required strength of 1381 other ranks (ORs) (four service companies and depot companies). Meetings and fund-raising concerts were held across Swansea and the new battalion held a joint parade with the 6th Welsh even though the Swansea Pals were still wearing their civilian clothes. Eventually the WNEC obtained uniforms in the grey Welsh cloth known as Brethyn Llwyd until sufficient khaki could be obtained. The battalion became the 14th (Service) Battalion of the Welsh Regiment and on 2 December it went by two special trains to Rhyl in North Wales to join 2nd Welsh Brigade of 1st Division, Welsh Army Corps (which were redesignated 129th (2nd Welsh) Brigade and 43rd Division shortly afterwards). The other three units in the brigade were the 10th (1st Rhondda), 13th (2nd Rhondda) and 15th (Carmarthen) Battalions of the Welsh Regiment.

== Training ==
On arrival at Rhyl the battalion was still only partially uniformed and equipped, but shortages were slowly filled and training advanced (the battalion brought in two civilian physical training instructors from Swansea). In April 1915 129th Bde and 43rd Division were renumbered as 114th Brigade and 38th (Welsh) Division respectively. By then the WNEC's over-ambitious plan to raise a complete Welsh Army Corps had been abandoned, and the 38th was the only Welsh 'Kitchener' division formed. In May 1915 Lt-Col Benson reported to Swansea Council that the strength of the 14th Welsh was 39 officers and 1144 ORs, still 200 short of its establishment, and urged them to continue their recruitment efforts. By the summer of 1915 battalion training and selection of specialists such as signallers was proceeding well, but with units scattered across North Wales there was no opportunity for divisional training. However, in August 1915 38th (W) Division began to concentrate around Winchester where it trained for open warfare on the Hampshire downland, leaving trench warfare to be learned when the troops reached the theatre of war. 14th Welsh were accommodated in tents at Morn Hill Camp on Magdalen Hill Down. Training with modern service rifles began for 14th Welsh in mid-September and men of the battalion carried out their musketry courses at Chilcomb Range and Rollestone Camp from 21 October. On 6 November 38 (W) Division was warned for service with the British Expeditionary Force (BEF) on the Western Front. Two days later 14th Welsh moved to Hamilton Camp, Salisbury, in order to complete the musketry courses, and mobilisation was completed.

Lieutenant-Col Benson was one of nine battalion COs in 38th (W) Division (all previously retired officers – 'dug-outs') who were replaced by younger men before the division went overseas. He was succeeded on 1 December by Maj Leonard King, from the 7th Middlesex Regiment, a pre-war Territorial Force (TF) unit, who was promoted to Lt-Col. Major John Hayes (formerly of the 3rd Dragoon Guards and later of the Shropshire Yeomanry (TF)) arrived to serve as second-in-command.

=== 21st (Reserve) Battalion ===
21st (Reserve) Battalion, Welsh Regiment, was formed at Colwyn Bay in July 1915 from the depot companies (E Companies) of the 14th (Swansea), 15th (Carmarthen), 16th (Cardiff City) and 19th (Glamorgan Pioneers) battalions of the regiment that were training in the area. As a Local Reserve battalion its role was to provide reinforcement drafts to the parent battalions when they went on active service. Lieutenant-Col Richard Vyvyan commanded the battalion from 19 July 1915 until he was replaced by Lt-Col Charles Young on 13 February 1916. By September 1915 it had moved to Kinmel Camp as part of 13th Reserve Brigade. On 1 September 1916 the Local Reserve battalions were transferred to the Training Reserve (TR) and 21st (R) Bn Welsh became 61st Training Reserve Battalion, though the training staff retained their Welsh Regiment cap badges. On 1 July 1917 it was redesignated 221st (Infantry) Battalion, TR, and on 23 July it joined 196th (2/1st Highland Light Infantry) Brigade of 65th (2nd Lowland) Division at Curragh Camp in Ireland. On 1 November it was transferred to become 52nd (Graduated) Battalion, Cheshire Regiment. It remained at the Curragh when 65th Division was disbanded in March 1918. After the Armistice with Germany it was converted into a service battalion on 6 February 1919, and in April it went to Germany to join 1st Brigade in Western Division of the British Army of the Rhine. The division was disbanded in August and 52nd Cheshires returned to Kinmel where it was finally disbanded on 22 September 1919.

== Service ==
On 2 December 14 Welsh marched from Winchester to Southampton Docks and embarked for France, landing at Le Havre the following morning. It then went by train to join the divisional concentration at Aire on 5 December, with 14th Welsh billeted at Creques, where it resumed training. From 20 to 27 December the battalion was attached to the experienced 57th Bde of 19th (Western) Division for its introduction to trench warfare in the line at Richebourg-Saint-Vaast. Each company was attached to a different battalion of 57th Bde. Afterwards the battalion went to rest billets at Robecq. On 7 January the battalion went up to the reserve billets and next day relieved 15th Welsh for a three-day tour of duty in the front line in front of 'Winchester Street'. The line was quiet, but the battalion lost its first men killed and wounded. It did another spell in the Winchester Street trenches 12–14 January, then 38th (W) Division moved to the Neuve-Chapelle sector, where 14th Welsh held the front line 26–31 January. It then began a period of regular rotation, alternating with 15th Welsh between the front line trenches or brigade reserve at Richebourg, then moved to the trenches at Givenchy in March. There was a steady toll of casualties in the line or from accidents on the bombing range, and that battalion received 68 reinforcement drafts. In April the division took over the line at Festubert, with 14th and 15th Welsh alternating in the front line. The area was so waterlogged that the defences took the form of a series of 'islands'. At night working parties helped the Royal Engineers (RE) to build up the crumbling parapets, a dangerous task when the opposing lines were only 40 yards (37 m) away. Intermittent shellfire and sniping caused a steady trickle of casualties when in the line, and further drafts of reinforcements were received. Lieutenant-Col King had gone on sick leave in January and was temporarily replaced by his second-in-command, Maj Hayes. King returned during March but was invalided on 4 April and Hayes was promoted to succeed him in command of 14th Welsh.

At the end of April the division moved to Laventie, with 14th Welsh moving from reserve into the front line trenches in the 'Moated Grange' sector on 28 April. Here it continued to alternate with 15th Welsh, going into rest billets at La Gorgue when not in the line. On the night of 4 June 14 and 10 Welsh launched separate bombing raids on the German line opposite. Earlier, trench mortars had bombarded the enemy barbed wire, but had only partially cut it. This had also alerted the defenders, and the 10th Welsh raid was quickly called off. For 14th Welsh's first raid 3 officers and 39 ORs of C Company were chosen, with two parties leading the attack and one in support. The right party under Lieutenant J.A. Wilson got into the empty enemy front trench undetected and then found and attacked some Germans. Lieutenant Llewellyn Corker (son of the late Mayor of Swansea) led the left party, which immediately came into contact with the defenders. A confused exchange of bombs ensued, the German retaliatory barrage opened up, and since any further advance seemed too risky the parties withdrew and rejoined the support party in No man's land before returning to their own trench. Here it was discovered that Lt Corker was missing. Later that night and again the following night patrols went out but failed to find him, suffering further casualties in so doing. Corker was later presumed killed (he is commemorated on the Loos Memorial). Total casualties for the raid and its aftermath were 1 officer and 1 OR missing, 1 OR killed and 2 died of wounds, 7 ORs wounded. Lieutenant John Strange, who had carried out the initial reconnaissance for the raid with Lt Wilson, commanded the support party, and afterwards led the search parties for Corker (and brought in two wounded men), was awarded the Military Cross (MC) for conspicuous gallantry, as was Wilson. 14th Welsh went into brigade reserve at La Gorgue on 5 June and then on 10 June 38th (W) Division was ordered south to join Fourth Army and prepare for the summer's 'Big Push', the Battle of the Somme. By the time 14th Welsh left for the Somme it had lost 3 officers and 44 ORs killed, 3 officers and 89 ORs wounded in the trenches, in raids or in accidents. The battalion moved to Savy, where it took part in two weeks of divisional training, practising wave attacks, before moving into the Somme sector. It arrived at Hérissart on 1 July as 38th (W) Division waited to join in the offensive.

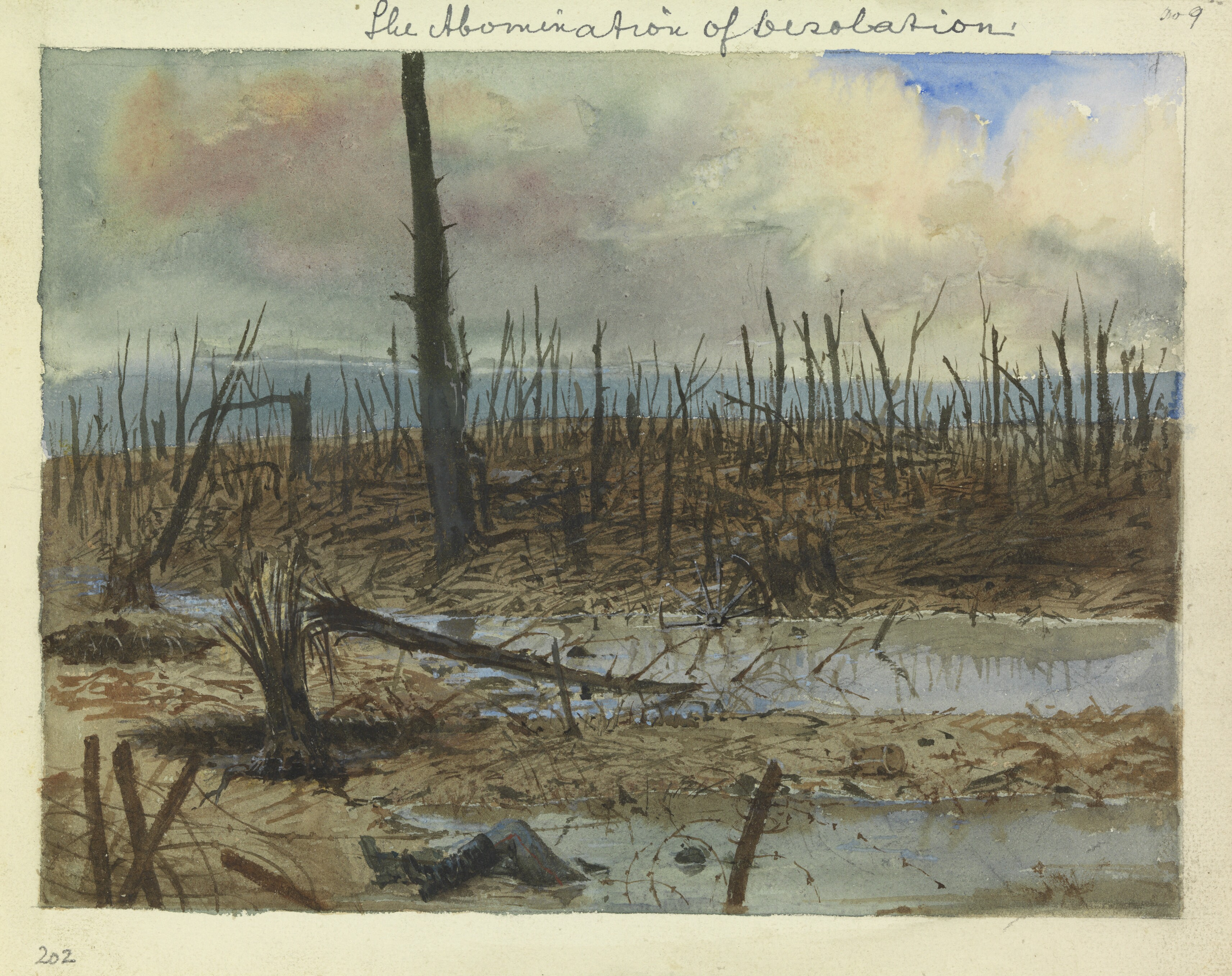
The Abomination of Desolation, sketch by J.B. Morrall of Mametz Wood after the 1916 fighting.

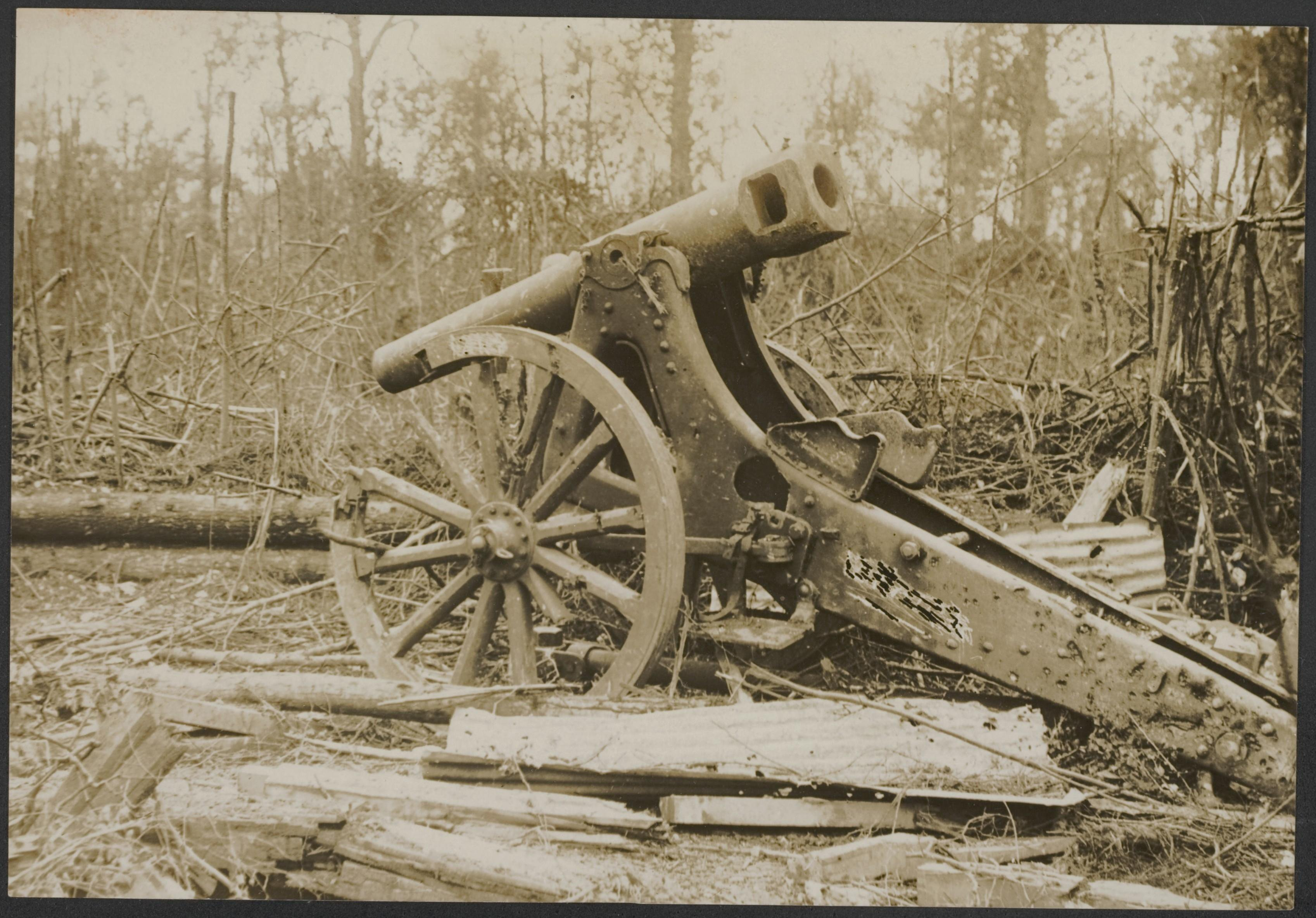
Abandoned German heavy gun (probably a 15 cm Ring Kanone C/92) overrun by 14th Welsh in Mametz Wood.

=== Mametz Wood ===
The Somme Offensive had begun on 1 July with a disastrous attack across a wide front. 38th (W) Division had been warned to accompany the cavalry in exploiting a breakthrough towards Bapaume. There was no breakthrough: instead the division was switched to the Mametz sector, where there had been some success. On the afternoon of 5 July it took over the front line and prepared to capture Mametz Wood. The initial attack on the south-east corner, the 'Hammerhead', was assigned to 115th Bde, which advanced on 7 July across the valley. This attack failed with heavy casualties and early on 10 July the division tried again, using its full weight, 113th and 114th Bdes leading. 114th Brigade (right) was to advance with 14th Welsh (left) and 13th Welsh (right) leading, 10th Welsh in support and 15th Welsh in reserve. Lieutenant-Col Hayes did not like the prospect: when he briefed his officers and platoon sergeants he told them 'Tomorrow at five minutes past four our battalion is going to take that wood, but' (then after a pause) 'we shall lose our battalion'.

The assaulting troops assembled on 'Fusilier Ridge' in front of 'White Trench' by 03.00 and the artillery and mortar bombardment began at 03.30, then a smoke barrage started at 03.50. The Germans began laying their defensive bombardment onto their own wire. At 04.05 the leading battalions (each in eight waves of two platoons at 80–100 yards (73–91 m) intervals) scrambled down the steep bluff into 'Caterpillar Valley' and then climbed steadily up the gentle slope towards the wood. 13th Welsh approaching the Hammerhead suffered heavy casualties from machine gun and rifle fire as well as the shells, but 14th Welsh escaped relatively unscathed by closely following their Creeping barrage into the edge of the wood before the defenders were ready. There they were clear of the German barrage, but shells of both sides passing over their heads frequently burst among the upper branches of the trees, causing further casualties. One section of 151st Field Company, RE, and three pioneer platoons of 19th Welsh followed 14th Welsh with orders to construct a strongpoint at the first objective (the first cross ride running east-west through the wood). By 04.50 14th Welsh were reported to be on their second objective (the second cross ride), although progress through the tangled undergrowth was slow, and direction-keeping was difficult in the restricted visibility (Lt-Col Hayes found some troops following a German barrage, mistaking it for their own, while others were firing in the wrong direction). At this point 14th Welsh captured an abandoned German heavy gun. By 05.10 detached parties of 14th Welsh had pushed up the central north–south ride and were almost through the wood, though 10th Welsh had been drawn into the fighting because of the heavy casualties, especially to 13th Welsh. At 05.50 the COs of 13th and 14th Welsh requested the artillery to lift onto the German second line, but the programme could not be changed, and they had to wait until 06.15. 14th Welsh then followed the barrage, but 113th Bde and 13th Welsh on the battalion's flanks were still held up, and 15th Welsh was being committed to the bitter fighting; the stretcher-bearers were struggling to cope with the numbers of wounded. Hayes visited his detached posts at the front and found little remaining opposition, though others reported stubborn pockets of enemy troops among the trees. Their fire was causing casualties to the Sappers and pioneers digging the strongpoint and communication trenches. At 09.35 the artillery observers saw fresh Germans entering the wood from the north to mount a counter-attack. However, the gunners dared not open fire on these targets for fear of hitting their own men. The counter-attack put pressure on 15th Welsh, who began to fall back. Brigadier-General Thomas Marden of 114th Bde placed Lt-Col Hayes in command of all the troops in the wood with a view to organising a new attack. As the second-in-command, Maj Brock Williams, and three company commanders had already been wounded the effective command of 14th Welsh devolved on Lt Strange. Brigadier-Gen Marden then got permission to enter the wood himself, and arranged for a concerted attack to drive the enemy out, timed for 16.30. This carried the troops to within 100 yards (91 m) of the far edge of the wood, where they were halted by a machine gun firing from a trench beyond the wood. A fresh attempt by 14th Welsh, reinforced by 17th Royal Welsh Fusiliers (113th Bde), failed to overcome this resistance, held up by fallen trees and undergrowth. They withdrew a little to allow the artillery to bombard the north edge of the wood, but still failed in another attack, exchanging bombing attacks with defenders clinging on in the woods. That evening 114th Bde's line settled down between the second cross ride and the northern edge, with 14th Welsh withdrawn into support. The enemy were shelling the rides, making the work of the runners very dangerous. 114th Brigade was relieved by 115th Bde at 05.00 the following morning and 14th Welsh withdrew to 'The Citadel' in divisional reserve. The battalion had sent 17 officers and 676 ORs into the wood and had lost 1 officer and 90 ORs killed, 11 officers and 286 ORs wounded. Lieutenant-Col Hayes was awarded a Distinguished Service Order (DSO) in the 1917 New Year Honours for his efforts at Mametz Wood.

Two days after being relieved, 38th (W) Division was back in the line in the Somme sector, albeit at Hébuterne in front of Serre where the fighting had died down after 1 July. As the Somme battles continued to the south, the division thinly held this quiet sector. 14th Welsh remained in billets and reserve bivouacs until 19 July when it took over the front line for a short tour of duty. It was in reserve from 23 until 31 July when it entrained at Doullens as 38th (W) Division moved north to join Second Army in the Ypres Salient.

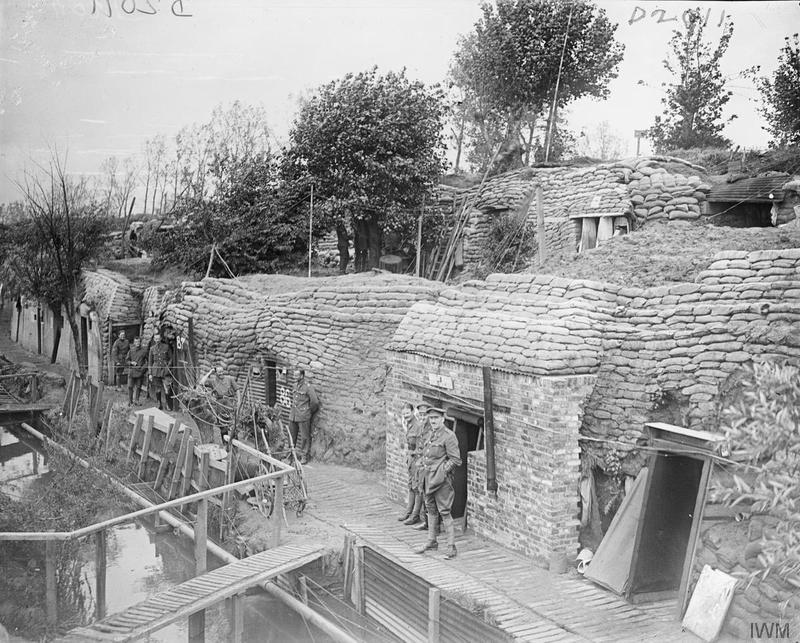
Dugouts at 'Canal Bank' along the Yser Canal.

=== High Command Redoubt ===
14th Welsh trained at Volckerinckhove and Wormhout until 10 August, and then was attached to 29th Division for night-time labour duties, burying communication cables. On 5 September the battalion rejoined 38th (W) Division and went into the front line the next day. It began a routine of alternating with 15th or 16th Welsh between the front line and the support positions at 'Canal Bank' (along the Yser Canal) and 'Machine Gun Farm', suffering a steady trickle of casualties, or resting in divisional reserve at 'D Camp' at Brandhoek. The division spent most of the next year holding this line facing Pilckem Ridge, spending the time improving the trenches and carrying out raids. Work on the trenches and strongpoints such as 'Turco Farm', 'Fusilier Farm' and 'Hill Top Farm' was frequently interrupted by enemy bombardments directed from an observation post on the higher ground in front, which was protected by the formidable 'High Command Redoubt'. 14th Welsh was ordered to carry out a raid on this troublesome spot and Lt-Col Hayes carefully planned a surprise attack by a strong party, comprising six officers and 146 ORs, together with an officer and 12 sappers from the REs. This group spent six weeks practising on a replica dug in the reserve area, and every night members of the party patrolled No man's land to familiarise themselves with the ground and locate the flanking machine gun posts protecting the redoubt. The divisional artillery fired to cut the enemy wire across a wide front, to disguise the actual point of the attack, and trench mortars were brought up to deal with the machine gun posts. The neighbouring divisions assisted with diversionary bombardments and the corps artillery was positioned for counter-battery fire to keep down retaliatory fire during the raid. Other precautions included special duckboarded communication trenches for the raiders to move forward, the provision of mats to cross any barbed wire not cut by the artillery, and 'battle police' stationed in No man's land to escort prisoners back. Just before Zero the front trench was evacuated to avoid casualties from German retaliatory fire. Zero was set for 23.10 on. the night of 17 November, and the raiding party with blackened faces assembled quietly in No man's land 20 minutes before that. At Zero there was a 3 minute hurricane bombardment of the Germans positions before the attackers went in, the retaliatory fire falling harmlessly on the empty trenches behind them. The raiders were in two waves, the first to make for the German support trenches, while the second dealt with the redoubt itself. This was found to be a concrete fortress with steel doors to the dugouts. However, it had been heavily damaged by months of British artillery fire, and the RE demolition party did further damage. The Germans trapped in the dugouts either surrendered or were bombed. On the right flank of the attack there was some hand-to-hand fighting. The raiders spent 40 minutes in the enemy trenches, an unusually long time, and came back with 20 prisoners, one machine gun and a hundredweight (50 kg) of equipment and documents for the intelligence staff. The battalion's losses were very light: 2 ORs killed by a trench mortar bomb in the British lines and 8 wounded (the party suffered heavier casualties – 2 officers and 10 ORs injured – in a rail crash on the way back to Canal Bank). It received numerous messages of congratulation from Second Army's commander, Sir Herbert Plumer, downwards.

On 11 December the division went into corps reserve, with 14th Welsh at 'Y Camp' near Poperinge, where it underwent a month's training. The battalion returned to the line on 13 January and resumed trench routine in the Canal Bank sector, at Hill Top or 'Lancashire Farm'. It carried out another period of training at Wormhout in late April, moving to the Boesinghe sector when it returned. During the winter months at Ypres 38th (W) Division's casualties were comparatively light, but 14th Welsh still lost 3 officers and 28 ORs killed, 2 officers and 72 ORs wounded. During much of April and May Lt-Col Hayes was in hospital or on sick leave, and the command devolved on Capt John Chamberlain from 15th Welsh, who was killed on 13 May. He was succeeded by Maj J.E.C. Partridge (10th Welsh), then by Capt Wilson and Maj Brock Williams, each for short periods.

In May 1917 38th (W) Division was warned that the British would launch an offensive (the Third Battle of Ypres) on the division 's front during the summer, and raiding was intensified in order to gain information on the opposing forces. In June the division was given its role in the forthcoming operation, and in the middle of the month was taken out of the line and went to the St Hilaire area to train for the attack over replica trenches and strongpoints. On 16 July the return march to the front began, and by 20 July 38th (W) Division was back in the line. The battalions were constantly called on for working parties to complete preparations for the much-delayed Ypres Offensive, and German artillery was active over both the front and rear areas attempting to disrupt the preparations with high explosive and the new Mustard gas. 14th Welsh had 50 men gassed between 21 and 31 July.

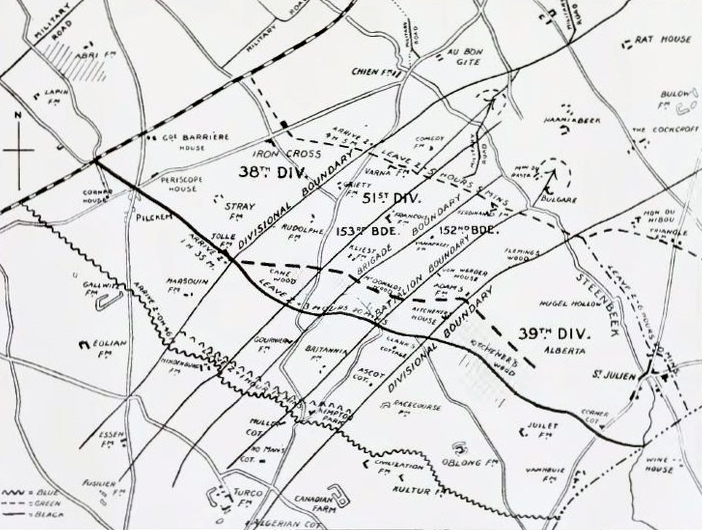
38th (W) Division's attack at Pilckem Ridge, 31 July 1917.

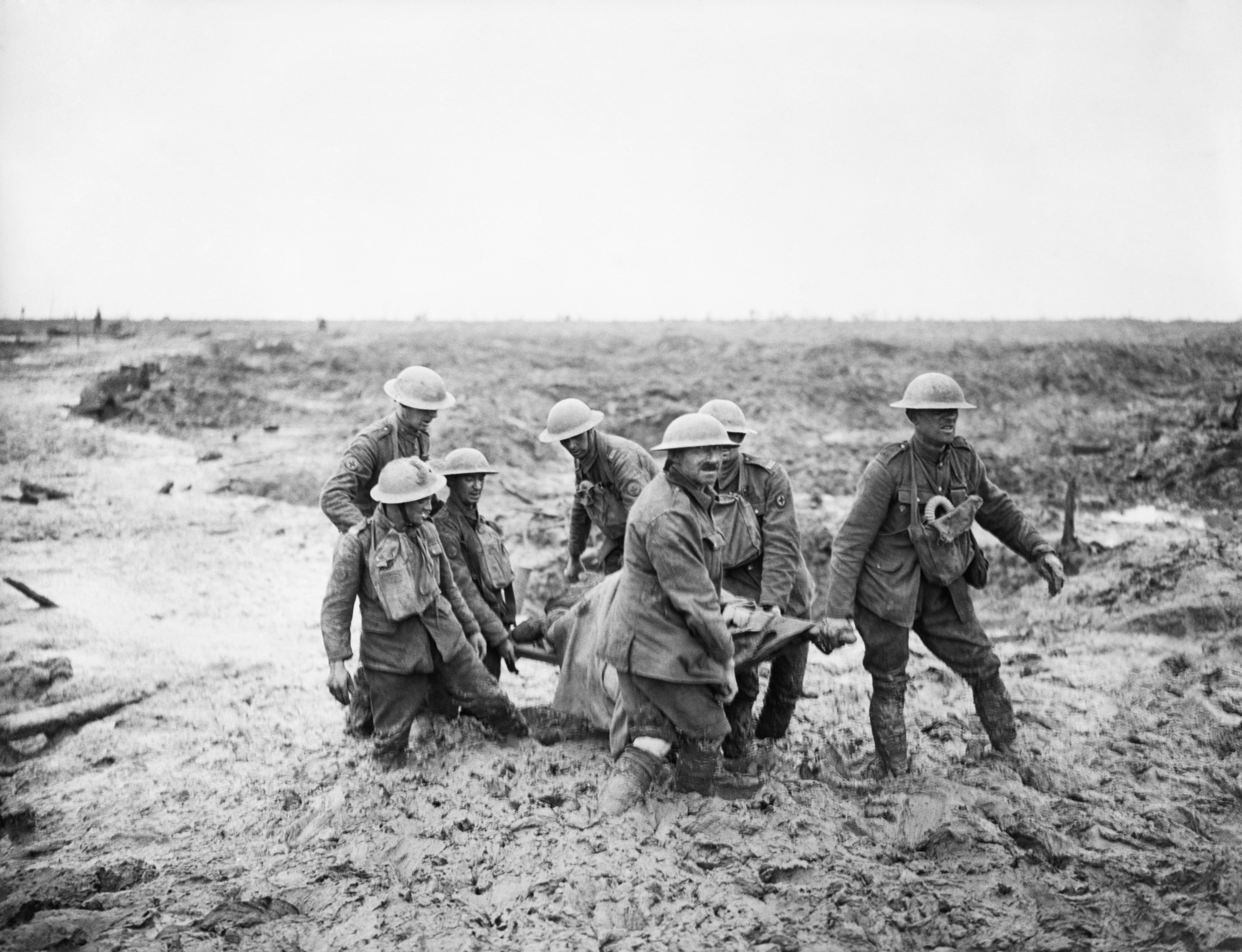
Stretcher-bearers struggle through the mud after the Battle of Pilckem Ridge, 1 August 1917 (Photograph by John Warwick Brooke).

=== Pilckem Ridge ===
The opening of the offensive was finally fixed for 31 July. 14th Welsh moved up to its assembly positions the night before without casualties, which its war diary attributed to its careful preparations and the fact that the Germans were simultaneously carrying out a relief of their front line garrison after days of bombardment. The plan for 38th (W) Division's attack was that 113th (left) and 114th Bdes (right) would advance up the slope of Pilckem Ridge and capture three successive objectives (the Blue, Black and Green Lines), including the pillbox and defended shell craters at 'Iron Cross' crossroads, a total advance of about 1.75 miles (2.82 km). In 114th Bde 13th (left) and 10th Welsh (right) would cover the first 1,000 yards (910 m) and take the Blue Line, then 14th (left) and 15th Welsh (right) would pass through to capture the Black and Green lines. Finally, 115th Bde would pass through to establish bridgeheads over the Steenbeek stream (the 'Green Dotted Line'). 14th Welsh sent 19 officers and 470 ORs into action under the command of Maj Brock Williams. Zero was at 03.50, and five minutes later the German counter-barrage came down on the assembly trenches where 14th Welsh were waiting. Apart from one company commander being killed, the casualties were light. 14th Welsh set off at 04.10 to follow 13th Welsh as far as the Blue Line. It then advanced towards the Black Line, B and C Companies leading and keeping very close to their creeping barrage. They met no opposition but took a number of prisoners, and having reached the objective they began to consolidate the position. At 07.15 D Company supported by A Company began their advance towards the Green Line. Some opposition was encountered from two machine guns at Iron Cross, which caused numerous casualties, but these were outflanked and then rushed with the bayonet, and 40 Germans were taken prisoner. 14th Welsh reached the Green Line on time, where a German dressing station was captured, with 16 wounded and 22 unwounded prisoners. Here the battalion began consolidating the position. Later 115th Bde passed through, but having crossed the Steenbeek it was hit by heavy counter-attacks starting about 14.30 and the bridgeheads were lost by 17.00. Instead of being relieved, 114th Brigade remained in support on the Iron Cross ridge for two more days, and when it was relieved by 113th Bde 14th Welsh remained on the ridge for a further two days under the command of that formation. During the afternoon of the attack it had begun to rain and this continued for days, the positions in the Steenbeek valley and on the ridge becoming very muddy, hindering all further movement. Duckboard tracks had to be laid to enable men and pack animals to get from Canal Bank up to the positions on the ridge, and these were mercilessly shelled and strafed by aircraft. Frontline positions consisted of a series of connected shellholes, and rifles and machine guns were constantly jamming with mud (Divisional HQ regularly sent up clean Lewis guns from stores). By the time it was relieved on the night of 3/4 August, 14th Welsh's casualties had risen to 5 officers and 80 ORs killed or died of wounds, 4 officers and 141 ORs wounded. The whole division went back to Proven on 6 August, where it got two weeks' rest. Captain Strange was awarded an 'immediate' DSO for his work.

38th (W) Division returned to the line on the night of 17/18 August after the Battle of Langemarck, 114th Bde taking over the ground that had been captured by 20th (Light) Division. During 17 August Brig-Gen Marden and officers of 14th and 15th Welsh who were to take over the ground that night met their opposite numbers of the brigade they were relieving. The meeting was held in 'Periscope House', a captured fortified cottage, but as the 114th Bde group left they were caught by a Shrapnel shell. Apart from Brig-Gen Marden, who was still inside, the only unwounded officer was Lt-Col Hayes. That night 15th Welsh took over the line with 14th Welsh in support. The line was no more than a string of disconnected shellholes, frequently half full of water and under constant shellfire; movement in daylight was impossible. 114th Brigade held the line until 23 August, with each battalion spending three days in the front line. 14th Welsh lost 7 ORs killed and 3 officers and 19 ORs wounded during its short tour at Langemarck. 115th Brigade then took over before 38th (W) Division was relieved on 11 September and left the Salient two days later.

=== Winter 1917–18 ===
In the middle of September 38 (W) Division took over the Fleurbaix sector just south of Armentières. Although Armentières and the Lys Valley was considered a quiet sector, the division had a wide front to hold with weak battalions. Much of the time was spent trying to drain and improve the chain of defensive positions in the low-lying and waterlogged country, which were mainly breastworks rather than trenches. During its tours of duty in the front line 14th Welsh was active in night patrolling among the ditches and abandoned farms of No man's land. From 17 November the 4th Battalion of the Portuguese Expeditionary Corps was attached to 14th Welsh for its introduction to trench warfare; when it took over its own section of line it had 14th Welsh alongside. In late November Lt-Col Hayes took over temporary command of 114th Bde and Maj Brock Williams (who was awarded a DSO in the 1918 New Year Honours) deputised in command of 14th Welsh. From 10 to 19 December a Portuguese brigade relieved 114th Bde, which had a few days' rest and training while billeted at Estaires. 114th Brigade then replaced the Portuguese in the line just south of Fleurbaix. It carried out tours of duty in this sector until 15 January 1918 when 38th (W) Division was relieved from the line and returned to Estaires for training. Casualties for the Welsh during the four months in the Lys sector had been unusually light, apart from some caused by gas shelling.

However, by early 1918 the BEF was suffering a manpower crisis. Brigades had to be reduced from four to three battalions, and the surplus war-formed battalions were broken up to provide reinforcements for others. On 7 February 14 Welsh received a draft of 8 officers and 150 men from B Company, 10th Welsh, which was among the battalions being disbanded. Lieutenant-Col Hayes had been injured in an accident during January; he was invalided on 15 February and Lt-Col Frank Brooke (Connaught Rangers) was transferred from 10th Welsh to take command of 14th Welsh.

The Allies were expecting a major German offensive, and rest and training for 38th (W) Division was interfered with by the need for large working parties to construct new defence works in the rear. In mid-February the division returned to the line at Houplines, near Armentières. During March the enemy became more aggressive, with frequent bombardments and raids.

=== Aveluy Wood ===
The long-anticipated German spring offensive opened on 21 March 1918 against Third and Fifth Armies, but the Armentières sector under First Army was not attacked, though enemy shelling grew heavier. However, as the situation deteriorated, the infantry of 38th (W) Division were rushed south by rail to the Albert area to reinforce Third Army. 14th Welsh entrained at Steenbecque on 1 April, arriving at Doullens. 38th (W) Division then moved up to support two divisions of V Corps that had been badly hit in the fighting and were holding an extemporised line along the River Ancre. 14th Welsh was billeted at Talmas at one hour's notice to go into action. However, the crisis had passed and the battalion established its HQ at Contay before going into the hastily constructed trenches of the new front line near Hénencourt on 11 April. It was in brigade reserve from 19 to 25 April while 115th Bde carried out operations to improve the line, returning to the front line for just one day before it was relieved by Australian troops and marched back to Warloy. 38th (W) Division then took over the line in Aveluy Wood from 35th Division on 1/2 May. 35th Division had tried and failed to capture the German-held ridge that dominated this wood, and 114th Bde was ordered to make another attempt from a different direction. This entailed the attackers forming up perpendicular to the enemy outposts and passing close across their front to attack the troops on the ridge. The attackers would, however, be screened by the trees and the attack would be a surprise. 15th Welsh made the main attack, supported by one company of 14th Welsh. The pioneers of 19th Welsh cut lanes through the saplings and undergrowth of the wood to allow the assault troops to form up silently on the night of 9 May. Zero was at 09.00 the following morning, but as the supporting barrage opened up one battery fired short, having miscalculated the range, which caused severe casualties to the assault troops and supports. The attack had to be abandoned, the company of 14th Welsh having lost 12 ORs killed and 30 wounded. Captain Strange who commanded the company was reported missing, but it later emerged that he had been taken prisoner.

After this failure, 14th Welsh continued to hold the line in Aveluy Wood, then went into brigade reserve, and finally rested at Toutencourt Camp until the division was relieved on 20 May and went for training at 'Bivouac Camp'. When it returned on 5 June 38 (W) Division was again holding the line from Aveluy Wood to Hamel, and the battalions of 114th Bde rotated between the front line at Mesnil, the support position in Martinsart Valley, and brigade reserve. From 29 June until 18 July the battalion was in divisional support at Englebelmer. From 19 July the whole division rested and trained at Hérissart, returning to Aveluy Wood on 6 August. 318th US Infantry Regiment was attached to 38th (W) Division for its introduction to the front line, and on 8 August Company B, 1st Bn, joined 14th Welsh, one platoon being attached to each Welsh company.

=== Albert & Bapaume ===
Fourth Army launched the Allied Hundred Days Offensive with the Battle of Amiens on 8 August, causing the Germans to retire along the Ancre on Third Army's front. Third Army immediately began planning its own offensive. This began with the Battle of Albert on 21 August. V Corps gave 38th (W) Division the task of crossing the flooded Ancre: 114th Bde at Hamel, 113th Brigade at Albert, a few miles south, and then they were to converge towards Pozières. The division was to advance by means of battle patrols, pushing on if the enemy showed weakness, but without committing to costly attacks. During the night of 21/22 August 14th Welsh's patrol attempted to ford the river and eventually found a way across where the German defences were unoccupied. The officer brought across six rifle sections of A Company and seized 'Chickweed Trench'. They were attacked with rifle grenades and machine guns, and they struggled to evacuate their casualties back over the river, but they held on. A section of REs was tasked with building a bridge to permit the rest of the battalion to join an attack at 01.00 on 23/24 August, but as they had not arrived by 22.30 the riflemen of the battalion under Maj James Daniel (on loan from 15th Welsh) crossed into this bridgehead, some of the men wading through neck-high water to reach their assembly positions. Next day the leading companies of the battalion pushed forward against light opposition, took Thiepval on the heights, and by 17.00 on 24 August had advanced beyond Pozières. Here Lt-Col Brooke with battalion HQ and the Lewis gun teams finally caught up, having helped to build the bridge to get their equipment across. 38th (W) Division launched another advance at 04.00 on 25 August and 14th Welsh gained 2,000 yards (1,800 m) towards Bazentin-le-Petit before being stopped by machine gun fire. The battalion began establishing a defence line to consolidate the gains, but the enemy voluntarily withdrew at 16.00. With the Germans falling back, 38th (W) Division kept up the pressure. On 27 August 13th and 15th Welsh attacked through High Wood, followed at 04.00 by 14th Welsh. At 06.00 the battalion took over the lead and despite machine gun fire managed to reach its objective, a trench north east of Delville Wood. By now the battalion had outrun its supporting troops and any troops on either flank, but tried to hold the derelict trench despite enfilade machine gun fire and attacks by bombing parties. With casualties mounting, 14th Welsh was ordered by Brigade HQ to withdraw after dark. It then held the captured ground around Bazentin and High Wood.

38th (W) Division paused for two days while the artillery bombarded the German positions, then 113th and 115th Bdes passed through 114th Bde and advanced as far as Morval on 29 August, but were unable to capture the village. At 05.30 next morning 114th Bde attempted to take the ruins of Morval with two battalions without a barrage, but 13th Welsh were late getting onto position, leaving 14th Welsh to attack with an open flank. This resulted in numerous casualties (it ended the day with only four officers left in the front line) and the failure of the attack against stiff German opposition from well-wired machine gun positions. The village was subjected to a day-long bombardment on 31 August and the brigade tried again on 1 September (part of the larger Second Battle of Bapaume), this time with a strong creeping barrage and all three (weak) battalions in line. The attack was successful, 14th Welsh taking all its objectives, and 113th Bde passed through to complete the mopping up. The field artillery barrage then supported 113th and 115th Bdes in a further advance over open ground, but they were later forced back almost to Morval. 14th Welsh was in supporting positions when 115th Bde attacked next day, but 38th (W) Division had to wait for a neighbouring division to catch up before launching its attack at 17.00, which failed. However, other British attacks had been successful, forcing the Germans to retreat to the line of the Canal du Nord. The following afternoon the battalion with the rest of 114th Bde formed the advance guard as 38th (W) Division and V Corps' cavalry (the Carabiniers) swept forward meeting no opposition until it reached slopes overlooking the canal. The canal line was heavily shelled with mustard gas by the Germans but just before midday on 4 September a company of 14th Welsh under Maj Daniel forced its way across the canal at Manancourt and covered the sappers of 123rd Field Company, RE. as they threw a bridge across. The battalion then advanced up the slope from the canal, screened by the lie of the land from Équancourt. However after they emerged from the dead ground they were stopped by fire from the defenders in Équancourt. The Germans suffered heavy casualties from the British shellfire but continued to resist as the battalion continued pushing forward on 5 September. At 22.00 14th Welsh were relieved and marched back to huts at Le Transloy to rest and clean up for six days. Although the two weeks of almost continuous operations were highly successful, casualties had still been heavy, 14th Welsh losing 6 officers and 74 ORs killed, 11 officers and 335 ORs wounded, with 22 ORs missing.

=== Hindenburg & Beaurevoir Lines ===
38th (W) Division went back into the line on 11 September. Third Army was now preparing for a series of major attacks to close up to the Hindenburg Line. 114th Bde was in reserve at Équancourt during the Battle of Havrincourt, but on the night of 17/18 it was brought up to attack the following morning (the Battle of Épehy). The objectives were 'African' and 'Heather' trenches (the Brown Line), then the trenches south west of Gouzeaucourt (the Green Line), all outpost positions of the Hindenburg Line. A heavy thunderstorm drenched the men at 03.00 and direction-keeping was difficult in the rain and darkness. There was also a good deal of gas shelling and the men had to wear their respirators for the last 1 mile (1.6 km) of the march to their assembly positions in 'Heather Support' trench. Zero was at 05.20: advancing in the centre of the brigade behind three lines of creeping barrage and a smokescreen, 14th Welsh only met 'indifferent' resistance at the Brown Line, where D Company was left to mop up and consolidate. From there to the Green Line machine gun fire was heavy and the enemy put up a stout fight. 113th Brigade made less progress on the left, so 114th Bde came under intense machine gun fire from Gouzeaucourt while consolidating. Next day 114th Bde held off several counter-attacks while 113th Bde struggled to come up into line. 114th Bde was relieved on the night of 19/20 September and went back to Équancourt for a week's rest and training. 14th Welsh had lost 1 officer and 14 ORs killed, 4 officers and 97 ORs wounded.

The Allies launched a concerted series of offensives all along the Western Front at the end of September, including Fourth Army's crossing of the St Quentin Canal on 28 September. For this operation 38th (W) Division was brought forward and occupied old trenches at 2 hours' notice to support the attacks, although it was not called upon. 14th Welsh waited on Fins Ridge, where gas shelling caused 4 officers and 18 ORs to be evacuated. By 3 October Fourth Army had made such good progress that the division had to change position to remain in supporting distance. This entailed a flank march over open ground, part of which was under enemy observation and under continuous bombardment with high explosive and mustard gas. From 4 October the division followed the advance of Third Army, 14th Welsh occupying captured trenches, and then part of the Hindenburg Line itself on 5–7 October. During 7 October it moved up, staging in the Le Catelet–Nauroy Line before going into assembly positions for next day's attack on the Masnières–Beaurevoir Line (the Battle of Cambrai). 38th (W) Division was to carry out an attack on Malincourt, then 114th Bde (13th and 15th Welsh leading, 14th Welsh in support) would pass through to take the high ground east of the village and exploit eastwards. Zero for 114th Bde was set for 08.00, but the rest of the division was held up and Divisional HQ attempted to delay 114th Bde's attack until 11.30, but at 08.00 the orders had only reached 13th Welsh. 15th Welsh followed by 14th Welsh went forward, marching in column expecting to reach their assembly position without difficulty. Instead they became caught up in 113th Bde's fight with machine guns and outposts at Mortho Wood in the Beaurevoir Line itself. Lieutenant-Col Brooke found his leading platoons unable to clear the wood, which was strongly wired, but unknown to him two Mark V* tanks of 11th Battalion, Tank Corps, had been detailed to assist 14th Welsh: 'they soon made short work of the wire and machine guns, thus enabling us to continue our advance'. Shortly afterwards the tanks were both knocked out by a hidden German field gun as they crossed the ridge, but 14th Welsh accounted for the gun. 114th Brigade was now in position to begin its planned attack on Malincourt. The barrage began at 11.30 and began to creep forward at 11.50, followed by the infantry. Leading battalions had been ordered to bypass the villages, leaving them to the support battalions – 14th Welsh in the case of 114th Bde. 14th Welsh entered the village at about 15.00, and in the course of the action it not only captured prisoners and machine guns, but also three 5.9-inch guns and two heavy trench mortars (Minenwerfers). The battalion lost 2 officers and 36 ORs killed, 1 officer and 99 ORs wounded. After the battle 114th Bde was ordered to billet in Bertry, but that place was still under shellfire, so it was moved to Clary, where it stayed from 9 to 12 October. From 13 October it was billeted in Troisvilles in support as the rest of V Corps pursued the enemy to the River Selle. By now, 38th (W) and 33rd Divisions were operating as a pair, leapfrogging each other forwards on V Corps' right.

=== Selle & Sambre ===
38th (W) Division returned to the line on 17 October to prepare for the assault crossing of the Selle. The attack was made on the night of 19/20 October, 38th (W) Division using 113th and 114th Bdes. 114th Brigade had 13th Welsh on the right and 14th Welsh on the left, with 15th Welsh in close support and B Company, 19th Welsh, attached to help consolidate the final objective. The attack was a surprise, with no preliminary bombardment, the barrage coming down at Zero (02.00). The river was not much of an obstacle, the sappers having already laid footbridges, and most of the troops were able to cross in battle formation. 14th Welsh had more difficulty: earlier it had sent two patrols across to seize German outposts on the far bank in. order to cover the crossing. One captured and occupied a house, but a German-held quarry resisted attack on two successive nights. 14th Welsh therefore had to form up 300–400 yards (270–370 m) west of the river. They managed to get across and up the slope beyond just in time to catch up with the barrage which fell for 4 minutes on the railway embankment behind. Luckily, the German machine guns were badly sited at the top of the embankment and their fire went over the battalion's heads as it struggled through the wire in the dark. The 40–50 feet (12–15 m) railway embankment was slippery and difficult to climb, with plenty of wire and machine guns, but the pioneers of 19th Welsh joined in to help rush the position, 14th Welsh taking 60 prisoners as well as three trench mortars in the quarry. The first two companies and two from 15th Welsh then stopped to mop up and consolidate the line of the embankment. At 02.34 the barrage moved on and the second wave of two companies followed, with the 19th Welsh. There was now only scattered opposition, though the pioneers mopped up an artillery battery that was firing at the infantry. The second wave was on the second objective by 03.15 behind a protective barrage. An hour later the barrage moved on to the ridge that was the final objective. As dawn broke the leading parties fell back to the cover of the reverse slope of this ridge, leaving Lewis gun posts on the forward slope. In all, 14th Welsh had taken about 75 prisoners for losses of 3 officers and 7 ORs killed, 2 officers and 104 ORs wounded. They and the pioneers then dug in and held the line until they were relieved next day, when 14th Welsh went into billets at Bertry. 33rd Division passed through on 22 October.

From 23 to 29 October 14th Welsh was in divisional reserve with 114th Bde, first at Troisvilles, then at Croix, while the troops rested and supplies were brought up. The brigade then took over the front line from 115th Bde and held it until 2 November, when 115th Bde returned to lead the attack on the Forest of Mormal planned for 4 November as part of the Battle of the Sambre. The plan was for 115th Bde to take the Blue Line, a ride crossing the wood about 500 yards (460 m) from the edge, then for 113th to pass through and take the Red Line about 2,000 yards (1,800 m) further on. Finally, 114th Bde would leapfrog through to take the Brown and then Green lines 3,000 yards (2,700 m) away, a total advance of some 4 miles (6.4 km) through thick woods, which would have to be accomplished by small columns led by officers with compasses. The creeping barrage, consisting of several different belts including smoke, would be fired 300 yards (270 m) ahead of the infantry, to avoid the airbursts in the trees suffered in Mametz Wood. 115th Bde successfully stormed the edge of the wood, then 113th Bde after being caught by the German counter-barrage reached the second objective on time. 114th Bde moved off from Croix at 07.00 and at 08.30 reached the British start line vacated by 113th Bde, where it also suffered from the counter-barrage. It then advanced through the forest spread in 'artillery formation', 14th Welsh on the left, 15th Welsh on the right and 13th Welsh supporting the 15th. 14th Welsh sent 17 officers and 558 ORs into the attack under Maj Brock Williams (out of a full strength of 27 officers and 775 ORs), on a two-company frontage, supported by two Vickers gun sections of 38th Machine Gun Company and two Stokes mortars from 114th Light Trench Mortar Battery (which had already helped 115th Bde with the initial 'crash' barrage). 14th and 15th Welsh set off from the Red line at 12.20 behind the creeping barrage. The troops of 114th Bde were able to make more use of rides through the tree rather than relying so much on compasses, though the rides were diagonal to the line of advance. When they reached the third (Brown) objective, 14th Welsh stood fast and became brigade reserve while the other two battalions went on to secure the final (Green) objective. Opposition had been light apart from machine guns covering clearings in the trees, which were dealt with. 14th Welsh's losses amounted to 1 officer and 62 ORs wounded, with none reported killed. Patrols having found no sign of the enemy in front, the brigade pushed on the following morning, ending 4 miles (6.4 km) ahead of the flanking divisions and having already outrun that day's objectives. 33rd Division then leapfrogged through to the River Sambre where the enemy made a stand that only delayed the advance for a day. Meanwhile, 114th Bde bivouacked on its captured ground without any shelter. When 38th (W) Division took over the lead again beyond the Sambre on 7 November, it used 113th Bde as its advance guard, 114th Bde following in support, 14th Welsh acting as flank guard. 113th Brigade followed the retreating enemy for the next three days, capturing stragglers but meeting no opposition. By then 14th Welsh had gone into billets at Écuélin, east of Aulnoye, on 9 November. The battalion was still there when the Armistice came into effect at 11.00 on 11 November 1918.

=== Post-Armistice ===
38th (W) Division concentrated round Aulnoye and continued training. Lieutenant-Col Brooke was awarded a second Bar to his DSO for his work in the final weeks of the campaign. demobilisation began in December, with critical workers (many miners in the case of 38th (W) Division) being released first. The division began withdrawing from the Aulnoye area on 27 December and by 4 January 1919 it had settled into billets to the east of Amiens, with 14th Welsh at Molliens-au-Bois, visiting Allonville for the presentation of colours on 16 January. Demobilisation continued, and on 27 February 14th Welsh sent a draft of 2 officers and 100 ORs to 2nd Welsh serving in the British Army of the Rhine. 14th Welsh moved into Allonviolle on 4 March. It had been reduced to a cadre before the end of March when it moved to Blangy-Tronville. On 23 May the cadre sailed from Le Havre to Southampton to be disbanded in Western Command on 30 May 1919.

== Insignia ==
The divisional insignia of 38th (Welsh) Division.

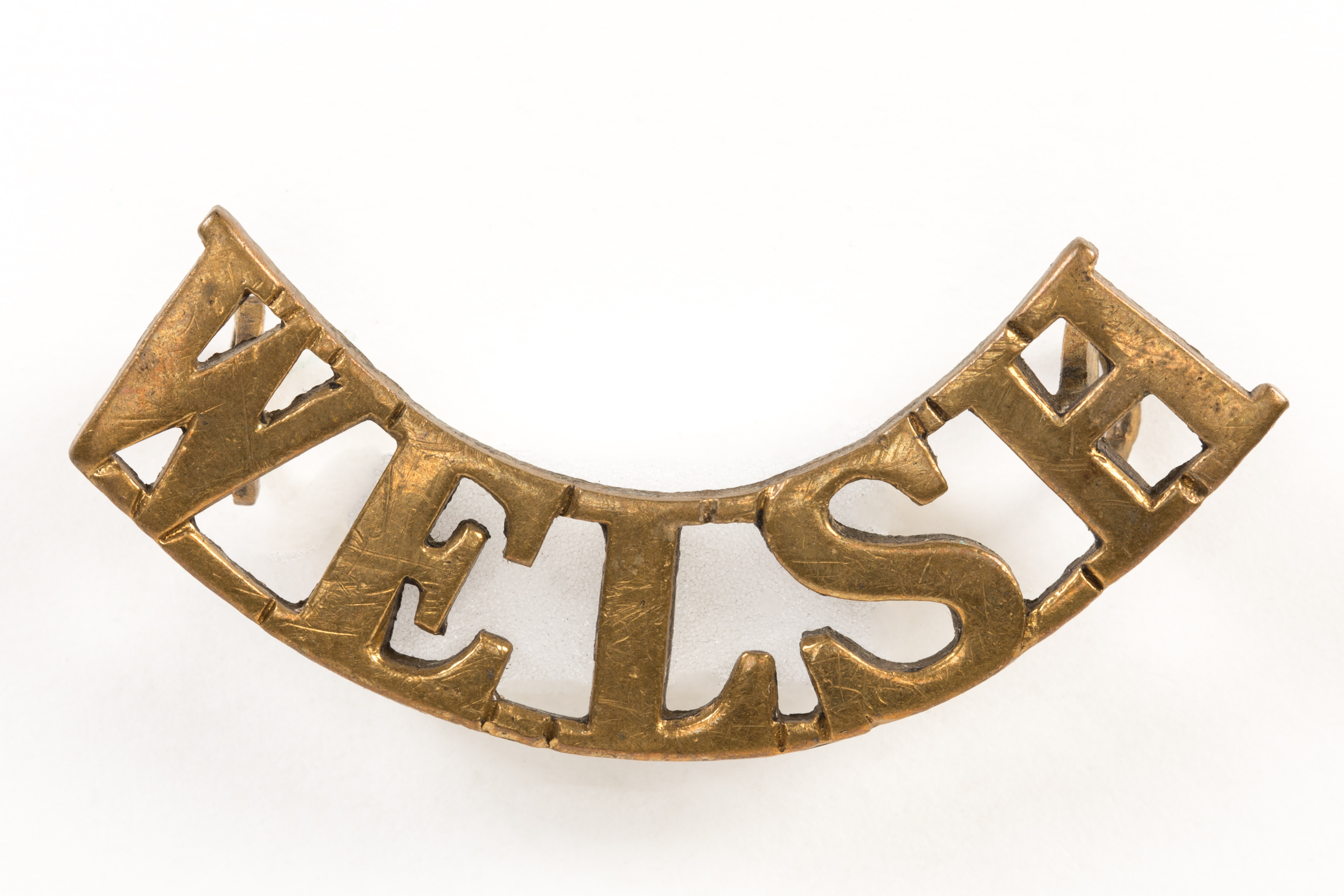
The Welsh Regiment's brass shoulder title.

The battalion wore the standard Welsh Regiment cap badge. During early training it wore a cloth title on the shoulder straps inscribed '1 Swansea Battalion'. Later a unique version of the brass shoulder title inscribed '14/WELSH' was authorised but apparently not issued, and the standard title was used. 38th (Welsh) Division adopted a scheme of coloured cloth geometric shapes worn on both upper arms to distinguish its brigades and units. Units of 114th Bde wore a circle, which was yellow in the case of 14th Welsh. After 38th (W) Division adopted the Red dragon of Wales on a black cloth rectangle as its divisional sign in January 1917, this was worn on the right arm and the brigade/battalion flash was worn on the left arm only.

== Memorials ==
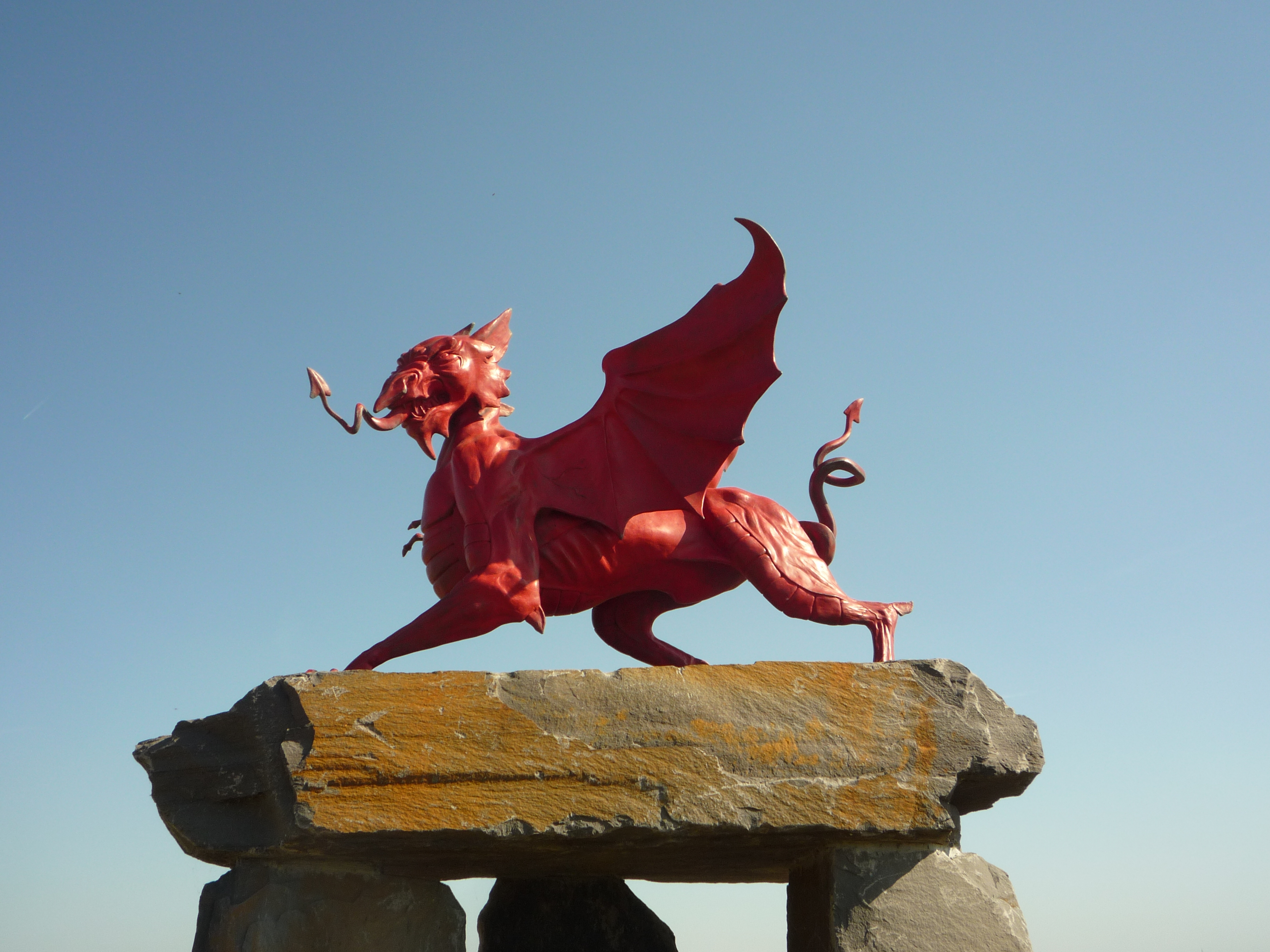
The Red Dragon of Wales atop the Cromlech of stones at the Welsh Memorial Park, Ypres.

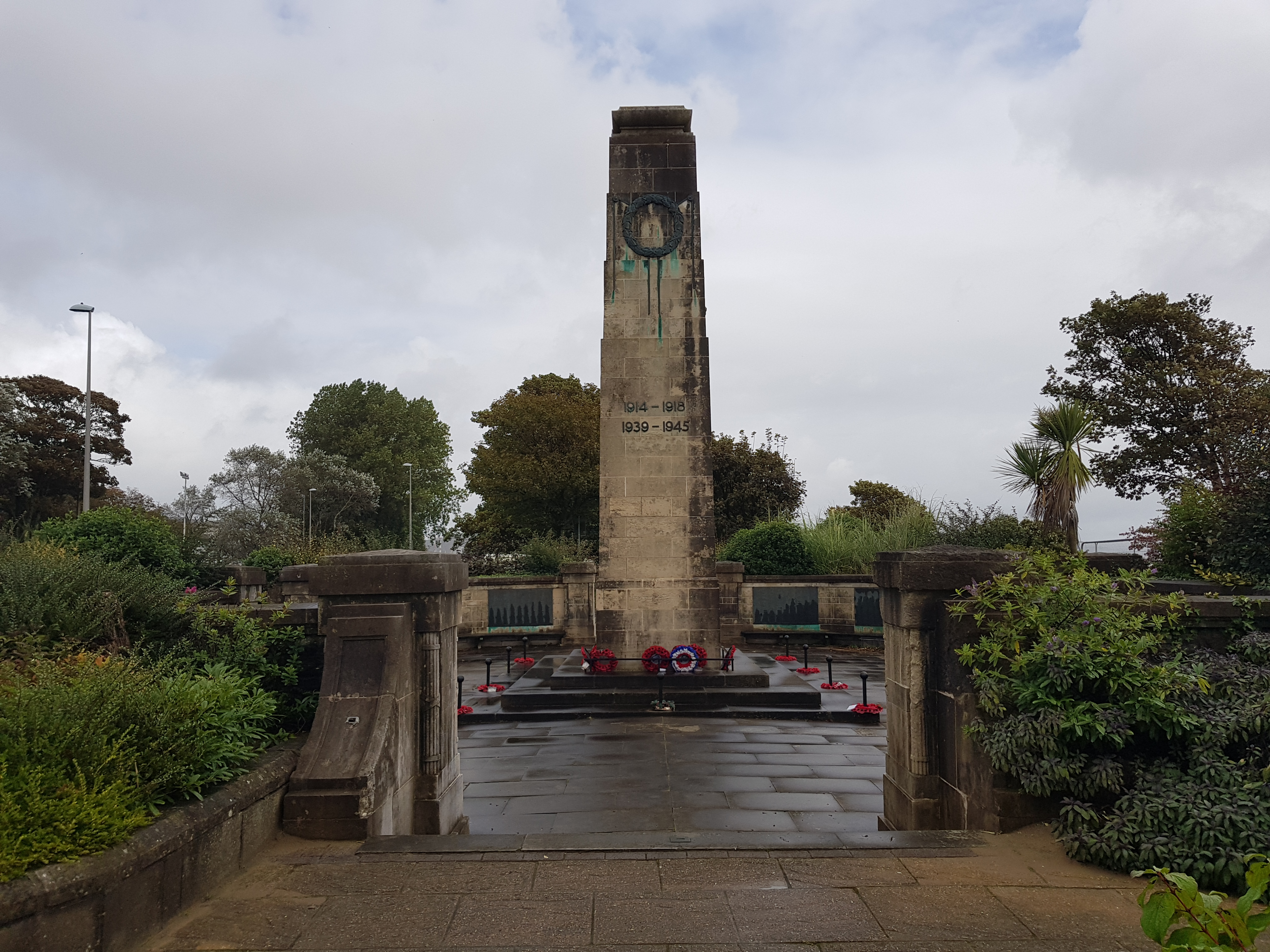
Swansea War Memorial.

The Welch Regiment's World War I memorial is a brass plate in Llandaff Cathedral that lists the number of dead suffered by individual battalions. The Welch Regiment Memorial Chapel, also known as St David's Chapel, was dedicated at Llandaff Cathedral in 1956 to commemorate all of the regiment's fallen since the 18th Century.

The Swansea War Memorial, which stands in a Court of Memory on the town's promenade, was inaugurated on 23 July 1923. Bronze plaques around the court list the names of over 2270 dead from the town, by service and unit. The plaques for the 14th Welsh bear 187 names, but these are only those from Swansea; the battalion had over 600 fatal casualties, the others coming from Neath, Port Talbot, Llanelli, and further afield. The Swansea Cricket and Football Club has its own memorial plaque, including the names of a number of members of 14th Welsh, who were among its earliest volunteers.

After the Armistice, war-formed battalions were granted a King's Colour. The 14th Welsh was presented with one of these at Allonville on 16 January 1919. On 2 June 1919 the colour was presented by Lt-Col Brock Williams to the Mayor to be hung in Swansea Guildhall. After a campaign by Lt-Col Hayes it was ceremonially transferred to veterans of the battalion in 1930 to be laid up in St Mary's Church, Swansea, where it would be on public display.

Red dragon sculptures commemorating the service of the 38th (Welsh) Division have been erected at the Mametz Wood Memorial (1987) and at Welsh Memorial Park, Ypres, on Pilckem Ridge (2014).
