= Alexander Bruce Tulloch =

British Army officer (1838–1920)

Major-General Sir Alexander Bruce Tulloch KCB CMG
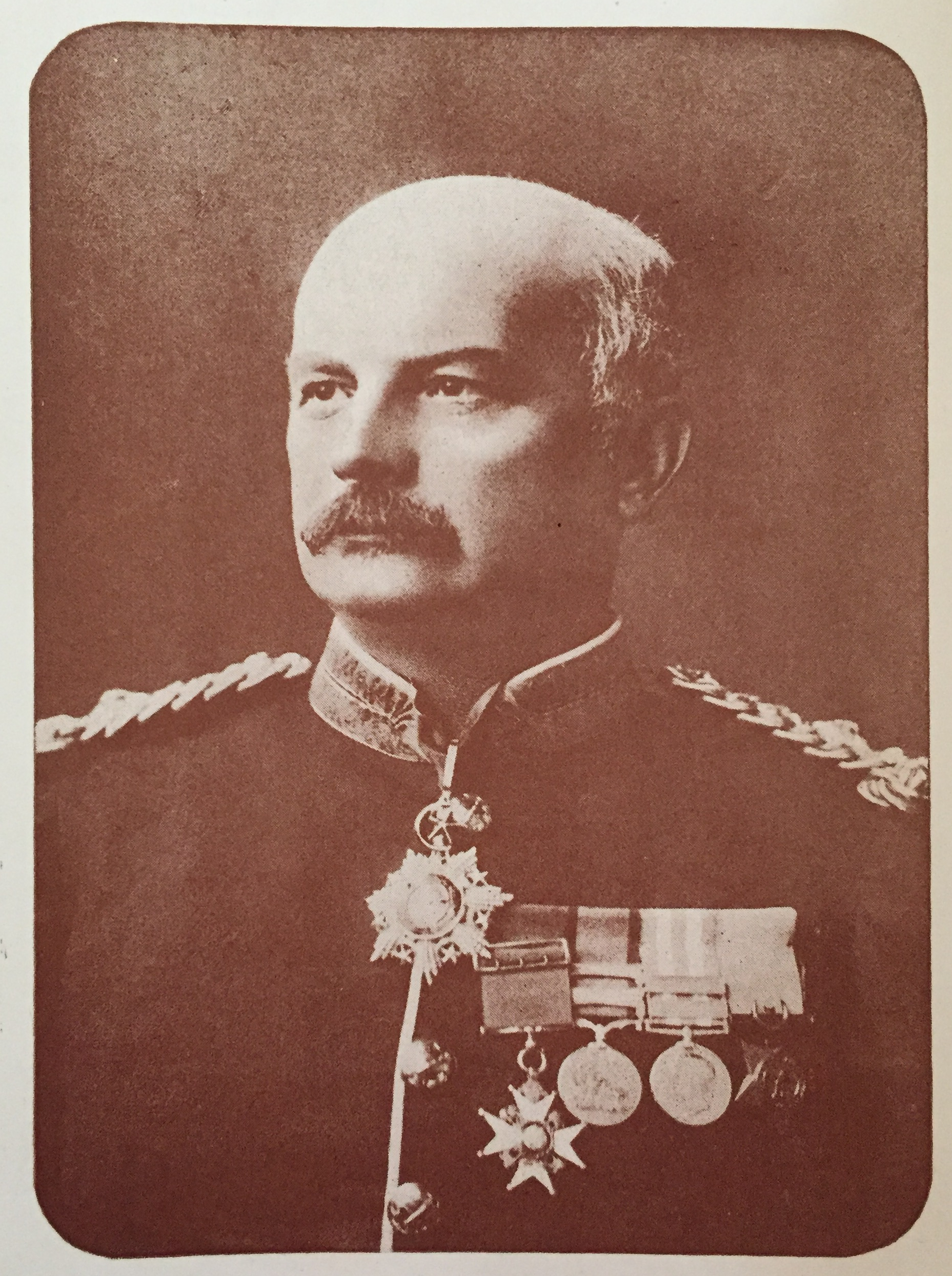
- Tulloch in 1892
- Born: 2 September 1838; Edinburgh, Scotland
- Died: 26 May 1920 (aged 81); Crickhowell, Wales
- Relatives: Brigadier General James Bruce Gregorie Tulloch (son)
- Military career
- Allegiance: United Kingdom
- Branch: British Army
- Rank: Major-General
- Commands: Commandant of the Victorian Military Forces
- Conflicts: Second Opium War; Mahdist War
- Awards: Knight Commander of the Order of the Bath; Companion of the Order of St Michael and St George

Major-General Sir Alexander Bruce Tulloch, KCB, CMG (2 September 1838 – 26 May 1920) was a British Army officer who served as military commandant for the Colony of Victoria, a war correspondent and an author.

== Military career ==
Tulloch was born in Edinburgh, the son of Lieutenant-Colonel Tulloch. He was educated at Royal Military College, Sandhurst, and entered the army as an ensign in the 1st Foot, in May 1855. He became lieutenant of that regiment in 1857; captain 96th Regiment of Foot in 1864; captain 69th (South Lincolnshire) Regiment of Foot in 1866; brevet major in 1877; major Welsh Regiment in 1881; brevet lieutenant colonel in 1882; lieutenant colonel Welsh Regiment in 1883; colonel in the army in 1886, and was placed on half-pay in 1888. He was appointed Commandant of the Victorian Military Forces with the local rank of major general, on 20 September 1889.

In 1890, Tulloch founded the Royal United Services Institute (RUSI) of Victoria, a security and defense think tank. He based it on the RUSI in London, of which he was a member.

In 1892, he presided over the commission appointed by the New South Wales Government to inquire into the military condition of that colony. He was appointed a Knight Commander of the Order of the Bath in the 1902 Coronation Honours list published on 26 June 1902, and invested as such by King Edward VII at Buckingham Palace on 24 October 1902. Due to economic conditions in the 1890s, Tulloch chose to resign as commandant to make way for a less costly commandant. He left Melbourne in 1894.

From July 1918 until his death, Tulloch was the colonel of the Welsh Regiment.

Tulloch was a Times war correspondent in Manchuria in 1904 and wrote several books including Forty Years' Service, The Highland Rising of the '45, A Soldier's Sailoring, and Possible Battlefields in the next European War.

After retirement Major General Tulloch lived quietly at Glaslyn Court, Crickhowell, Brecknockshire, Wales, where he died in 1920.

== Family ==
Tulloch was married twice, first in 1865 to Arabella Healis, daughter of Stephen Healis. He had five sons, including Sylvester Stephen Gregorie Tulloch, who lived in India.

Honorary titles
Preceded by William Allan	Colonel of the Welsh Regiment; 1918–1920	Succeeded by Sir Thomas Marden
