= Kenneth Woodroffe =

English cricketer and British Army officer

Personal information
- Full name: Kenneth Herbert Clayton Woodroffe
- Born: 9 December 1892; Lewes, Sussex, England
- Died: 13 May 1915 (aged 22); Neuve-Chapelle, Pas-de-Calais, France
- Batting: Right-handed
- Bowling: Right-arm fast

Domestic team information
- Years: Team
- 1912–1913: Hampshire
- 1913–1914: Cambridge University
- 1914: Sussex

Career statistics
Competition	First-class
Matches	18
Runs scored	172
Batting average	8.19
100s/50s	–/–
Top score	22*
Balls bowled	2,586
Wickets	55
Bowling average	27.27
5 wickets in innings	2
10 wickets in match	–
Best bowling	6/43
Catches/stumpings	5/–
- Source: Cricinfo, 27 June 2023

Kenneth Herbert Clayton Woodroffe (9 December 1892 − 13 May 1915) was an English first-class cricketer and British Army officer. He predominantly played his first-class cricket for Cambridge University Cricket Club as a fast bowler. He later saw action in the First World War with the Rifle Brigade and was killed in action on the Western Front in May 1915.

== Early life and cricket ==
The son of Henry Long Woodroffe and his wife, Clara, he was born at Lewes in December 1892. He was educated firstly at Rose Hill School in Kent, before attending Marlborough College, where he played for the college cricket team. From there, he matriculated to Pembroke College, Cambridge. Toward the end of the 1912 season, Woodroffe made his debut in first-class cricket for Hampshire against the touring South Africans at Bournemouth. His debut was a success with the ball, taking figures of 5 for 33 in the South Africans first innings with his right-arm Fast bowling. As a freshman at Cambridge in 1913, he played first-class cricket for Cambridge University Cricket Club on six occasions as a bowler, gaining his blue in that seasons University Match at Lord's. He also played for Hampshire against Cambridge in that season. The following season, Woodroffe made a further eight first-class appearances for Cambridge and appeared once again in The University Match. In the 1914 season, he appeared in two final first-class matches for Sussex in the County Championship. Described by Frederic Wilson in the 1912 Wisden Cricketers' Almanack as a "really fast [bowler]" who "can make the ball turn from the off on nearly any wicket". His bowling action was described by Wilson as "a high and easy one, and, being tall, [h]e often makes the ball [g]et up very quickly". His first-class career lasted 18 matches, with Woodroofe taking 55 wickets at an average of 27.27. For Cambridge, he took 41 wickets, but never took a five wicket haul for the university. His best innings bowling figures of 6 for 43 came for Sussex against Surrey.

== First World War service ==
With the onset of the First World War, Woodroffe was commissioned into the 6th Battalion, Rifle Brigade as a second lieutenant in August 1914. He went to Western Front with the 6th Battalion, which was attached to the 2nd Battalion, Welsh Regiment. He was promoted to lieutenant in April 1915, and had been mentioned in dispatches. Woodroffe was killed in action on 13 May 1915, during an assault on a German trench near Neuve-Chapelle. He was commemorated at the Le Touret Memorial. His 19-year-old brother, second lieutenant Sidney Woodroffe (8th Rifle Brigade), was killed two months after him in 1915 while showing such bravery that he was awarded the Victoria Cross. Another brother, Leslie, was also killed in action during the war.
