= Dyson Williams =

Welsh cricketer

Dyson Bransby Williams DSO MC, later Dyson Brock Williams (13 October 1877 – 18 April 1922) was a Welsh cricketer. He was a right-handed batsman who played first-class cricket for Glamorgan during the 1921 season.

Williams was educated at Malvern School, and played cricket during the school holidays for Swansea Football and Cricket Club. Thanks to his many connections, and in spite of running a solicitors' practice alongside his cricketing career, he still managed to play occasionally until the outbreak of World War I in 1914.

Early in the war he helped to raise the 'Swansea Pals' (the 14th (Service) Battalion, Welsh Regiment (Swansea)), rising to second-in-command and leading the battalion in several actions, winning a Military Cross and a Distinguished Service Order. He ended the war with the rank of Lieutenant-Colonel.

Following his experiences during the war, which left him mentally and physically scarred, he took up gambling and losing a vast amount of his accrued money in the process. He killed himself with gas in 1922.

He played his first and only County Championship game during the 1921 season, against Hampshire, later becoming friends with Georges Carpentier and going to work in London for a boxing promoter. However, having lived in Swansea nearly all his life, Williams had recently returned to live with his mother and brothers at Killay House, Swansea. He kept on losing money and was found dead in April 1922 in the gas-filled City of London office of his friend Major James Arnold Wilson, a promoter of boxing matches. An inquest was held, and the coroner found that Williams had taken his own life while insane.
