= Thomas Marden =

British Army general (1866–1951)

Major-General Sir Thomas Marden KBE CB CMG
- Born: 15 September 1866; Bath, Somerset, England
- Died: 11 September 1951 (aged 84); Folkestone, Kent, England
- Military career
- Allegiance: United Kingdom
- Branch: British Army
- Service years: 1886–1927
- Rank: Major-General
- Service number: 702
- Units: Cheshire Regiment; Northumberland Fusiliers; Welsh Regiment
- Commands: 1st Battalion, Welsh Regiment; 114th Infantry Brigade; 6th Division; 53rd (Welsh) Infantry Division
- Conflicts: Second Boer War; World War I
- Awards: Knight Commander of the Order of the British Empire; Companion of the Order of the Bath; Companion of the Order of St Michael and St George; Mentioned in dispatches Order of St Vladimir, 4th class
- Other work: Author

Major-General Sir Thomas Owen Marden KBE CB CMG (15 September 1866 – 11 September 1951) was a British Army officer, active during the Second Boer War and World War I, where he commanded a battalion of the Welsh Regiment, a brigade, and finally the 6th Division. Following the war, he commanded a British occupying force in Turkey during the Chanak Crisis in the early 1920s.

== Early military career ==
Born in Bath, Somerset, Marden attended Berkhamsted School and the Royal Military College at Sandhurst, from where he was commissioned as a subaltern, with the rank of lieutenant, into the Cheshire Regiment on 25 August 1886. He saw service with his regiment in Burma from 1887 to 1889, during the colonial campaigns following the Third Anglo-Burmese War, and was promoted to captain on 15 May 1896.

Following the outbreak of the Second Boer War in October 1899, he was posted on special duty as district commandant in South Africa. Leaving London in February 1900, he was senior officer in command of reinforcements on board the SS Cheshire for the journey, and arrived in South Africa the following month. He was mentioned in dispatches for service during the war.

He returned to England to attend the Staff College, Camberley, graduating in 1902 and gaining his psc and being posted to staff duties in India as a deputy assistant adjutant general (DAAG). In 1904 he was posted to the directorate of training at the War Office in London. Whilst on staff duties, in December 1905, he had been promoted to a majority in the Northumberland Fusiliers (later the Royal Northumberland Fusiliers), and was appointed as a GSO2 at the War Office in July 1907. In July 1908 he was transferred into the Welch Regiment (later the Welch Regiment) as a major, supernumerary to establishment. He was soon promoted to the substantive rank.

In April 1910 he succeeded William Heneker as a deputy assistant adjutant and quartermaster general (DAA&QMG). In December 1912 he was promoted to lieutenant colonel and left South Africa in order to take up command of the 1st Battalion, Welsh Regiment.

== First World War ==
At the outbreak of World War I, Marden's battalion was stationed in India; it was brought back to the United Kingdom and allocated to the 84th Infantry Brigade of the 28th Division, which was to be sent to the Mediterranean. Whilst passing through France, units of the division were used to support operations on the Western Front, and Marden was wounded by shrapnel whilst commanding his battalion at the Second Battle of Ypres in April–May 1915.

Later in November 1915, he was promoted to the temporary rank of brigadier general in order to take command of the 114th Infantry Brigade, part of the 38th (Welsh) Division, a Kitchener's Army formation. He was promoted to brevet colonel as a reward, "for Distinguished Service in the Field", in June 1916. He commanded the brigade until mid-1917, during which time it fought at the Battle of the Somme in mid-1916, where it took heavy losses, and on the first day of the Battle of Passchendaele a year later. He was made a substantive colonel in December 1916.

In August 1917 he was again promoted, this time to the temporary rank of major general, to become GOC of the 6th Division in the place of Major General Charles Ross, which he commanded at the Battle of Cambrai in November and in the Hundred Days Offensive in the latter half of 1918.

Following the Armistice with Germany, he commanded a brigade in the occupying British Army of the Rhine (BAOR).

For his services during the war, he was mentioned in despatches eight times, and made a Companion of the Order of the Bath and a Companion of the Order of St Michael and St George, as well as being made an officer of the French Légion d'Honneur and the Russian Order of St. Vladimir (fourth class, swords), and awarded the Croix de Guerre with palm. His rank of major general, only temporary during the war, was made substantive in June 1919.

== Later service ==
In May 1920 Marden was appointed colonel of the Welch Regiment and in July 1921 was given command of the British forces occupying Constantinople. During the Chanak Crisis of 1922 he played a key role in negotiating a peaceful settlement between British and Turkish forces, for which he was appoined a Knight Commander of the Order of the British Empire (KBE) in the 1924 Birthday Honours. He returned home in 1923 to become GOC of the 53rd (Welsh) Infantry Division, a Territorial Army (TA) formation. He took command in June from Major General Archibald Montgomery before retiring from the army in June 1927. He held the ceremonial colonelcy of the Welch Regiment from 1920 to January 1941.

In 1920, he wrote a short history of 6th Division from 1914 to 1918, and in 1932 wrote a history of the Welch Regiment during the same period.

He died at Folkestone, Kent, in 1951 aged eighty-four and was buried St Martin's churchyard at nearby Cheriton.

Military offices
Preceded by Charles Ross	GOC 6th Division; 1917–1919	Succeeded by Peter Strickland
Honorary titles
Preceded by Sir Alexander Tulloch	Colonel of the Welsh Regiment; 1920–1941	Succeeded by Douglas Dickinson
Military offices
Preceded by Archibald Montgomery	GOC 53rd (Welsh) Infantry Division; 1923–1927	Succeeded by Thomas Cubitt
