= Edgar Myles =

English Victoria Cross recipient

Edgar Kinghorn Myles
- Born: 29 July 1894; East Ham, Essex, England
- Died: 31 January 1977 (aged 82); Bishopsteignton, Devon, England
- Military career
- Allegiance: United Kingdom
- Branch: British Army
- Service years: 1914–1928; 1939–1940
- Rank: Captain
- Service number: 9311
- Units: Welsh Regiment; Worcestershire Regiment; King's Regiment (Liverpool)
- Conflicts: First World War; Second World War
- Awards: Victoria Cross; Distinguished Service Order; Mentioned in dispatches

Captain Edgar Kinghorn Myles, VC, DSO (29 July 1894 – 31 January 1977) was a British Army officer and an English recipient of the Victoria Cross (VC), the highest award for gallantry in the face of the enemy that can be awarded to British and Commonwealth forces.

== Military career ==
Myles was deployed with the 8th (Service) Battalion, Welsh Regiment, British Army, attached to 9th (Service) Battalion, Worcestershire Regiment. On 9 April 1916 at Sanna-i-Yat, Mesopotamia, during combat, Second lieutenant Myles went out alone several times in front of British advanced trenches to assist wounded men on the battlefield. While under heavy rifle fire, and at great personal risk, he carried in a wounded officer to safety. For his service he received the Victoria Cross. The citation for his award read:

2nd Lt Edgar Kinghorn Myles, Welsh R. For most conspicuous bravery. He went out alone on several occasions in front of our advance trenches, and, under heavy rifle fire and at great personal risk, assisted wounded men lying in the open. On one occasion he carried in a wounded officer to a place of safety under circumstances of great danger.

Myles transferred to the King's Regiment (Liverpool) as a lieutenant in 1923 and was later promoted to captain.

Myles' Victoria Cross is displayed at Worcester City Art Gallery & Museum in Worcester, England.

== Bibliography ==
- Gliddon, Gerald (2005). The Sideshows. VCs of the First World War. Sutton Publishing. ISBN 978-0-7509-2084-1.
