= Welch Regiment =

British Army formation

Welsh Regiment Welch Regiment
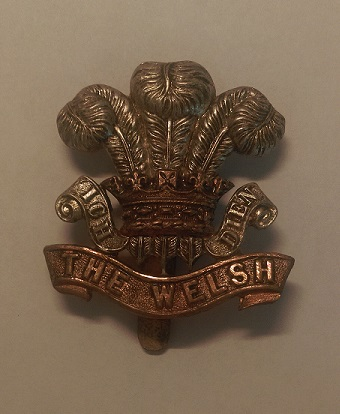
- Cap badge
- Active: 1881–1969
- Country: United Kingdom
- Branch: British Army
- Type: Infantry
- Role: Line infantry
- Size: 1–2 Regular battalions 1 Militia and Special Reserve battalion Up to 4 Territorial and Volunteer battalions Up to 27 Hostilities-only battalions
- Garrison/HQ: Maindy Barracks, Cardiff
- Motto: Gwell angau na Chywilydd (Better Death than Dishonour)
- March: Quick: Ap Siencyn (Son of Jenkin)
- Mascot: Goat
- Anniversaries: Gheluvelt, 31 Oct

Pte Hood in the Welsh Regimental "walking-out" dress worn in hot-climates; stationed in British India c. 1896

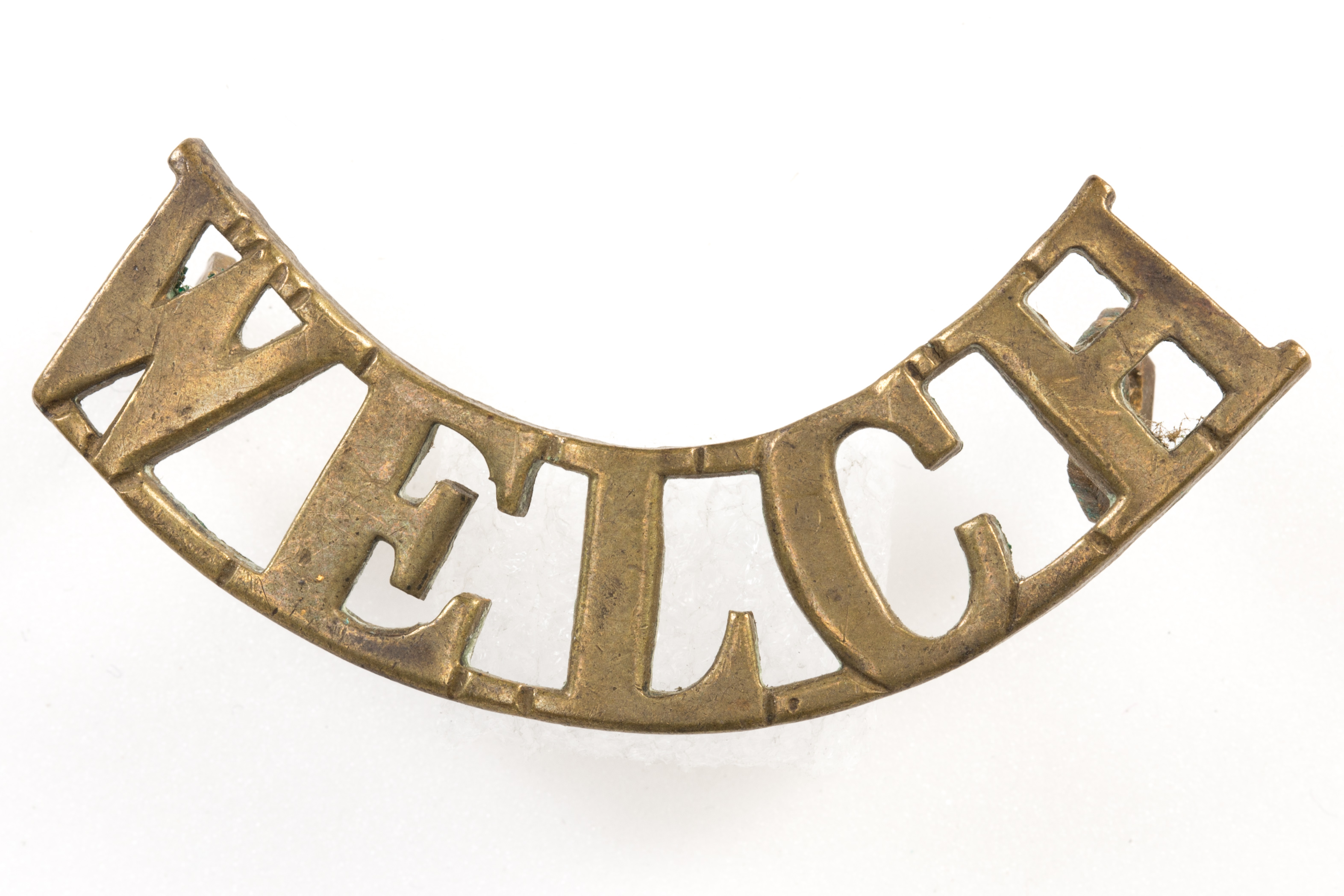
Regimental badge with "Welch" spelling

The Welch Regiment (or "The Welch", an archaic spelling of "Welsh") was an infantry regiment of the line of the British Army in existence from 1881 until 1969. The regiment was created in 1881 under the Childers Reforms by the amalgamation of the 41st (Welch) Regiment of Foot and 69th (South Lincolnshire) Regiment of Foot to form the Welsh Regiment, by which it was known until 1920 when it was renamed the Welch Regiment. In 1969 the regiment was amalgamated with the South Wales Borderers to form the Royal Regiment of Wales.

== History ==
=== Formation ===
The regiment was created in 1881 under the Childers Reforms by the amalgamation of the 41st (Welch) Regiment of Foot and 69th (South Lincolnshire) Regiment of Foot to form the Welsh Regiment.

The 1st Battalion moved to Egypt in 1886. The battalion took part in the Battle of Suakin in December 1888 during the Mahdist War under the leadership of the force commander, Colonel Herbert Kitchener, who wrote in his dispatches:

The half-Battalion of The Welsh Regiment are seasoned soldiers and whatever I asked of them to do they did well. Their marksmen at Gemaizah Fort and the remainder of the half-Battalion on the left fired section volleys driving the Dervishes from their right position and inflicting severe punishment upon them when in the open. Significantly the Battalion did not lose a man.

The 1st Battalion moved to Malta in 1889 while the 2nd Battalion went to India in 1892; the 1st Battalion moved to Pembroke Dock in December 1893 where almost all the regiment's artifacts, plate and silver were lost in a large fire in 1895. The 1st Battalion was dispatched to South Africa in November 1899 for the Second Boer War: it was engaged in Battle of Paardeberg in February 1900, where they suffered heavy losses, and again at the Battle of Driefontein in March 1900.

A 3rd, militia battalion, was embodied in December 1899, and embarked for South Africa in February 1900 to serve in the same war. In 1908, the Volunteers and Militia were reorganised nationally, with the former becoming the Territorial Force and the latter the Special Reserve; the regiment now had one Reserve battalion and four Territorial battalions.

=== First World War ===
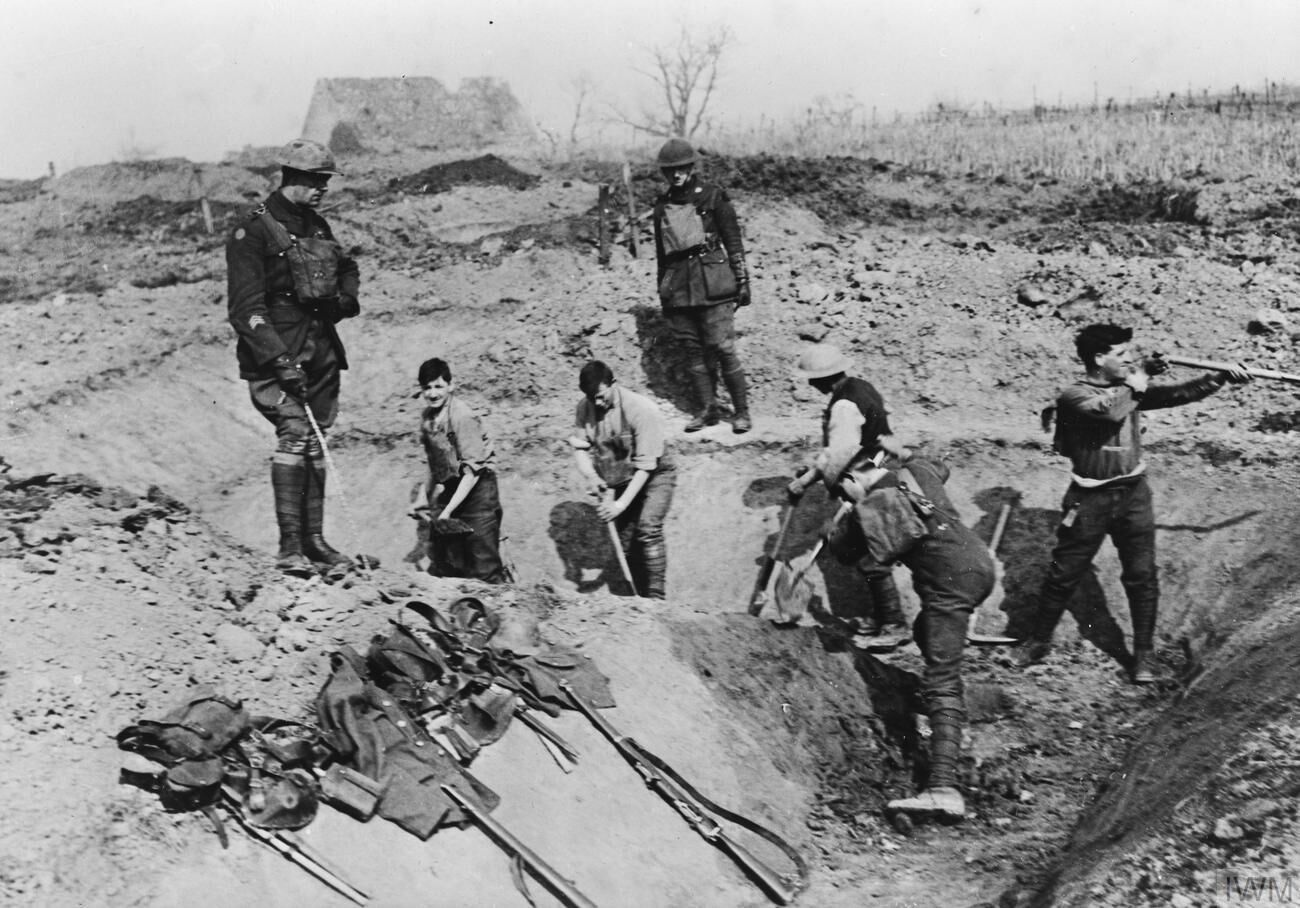
13th Battalion The Welsh Regiment at Houplines in France on 13 March 1918

==== Regular Army ====
The 1st Battalion, after returning from India, landed at Le Havre as part of the 84th Brigade in 28th Division in January 1915 for service on the Western Front but moved to Egypt and then on to Salonika in November 1915. The 2nd Battalion landed at Le Havre as part of the 3rd Brigade in the 1st Division in August 1914 for service on the Western Front. Lance Corporal William Charles Fuller, of the 2nd Battalion, won the Welsh Regiment's first Victoria Cross of the war when, under withering and sustained rifle and machine gun fire, he advanced one hundred yards to rescue Captain Mark Haggard who was mortally wounded on Chézy sur Aisne on 14 September 1914.

==== Territorial Force ====
The 1/4th Battalion and 1/5th Battalion landed at Suvla Bay as part of the 159th Brigade in the 53rd (Welsh) Division in August 1915; after being evacuated from Gallipoli in December 1915 the battalion moved to Egypt. The 1/6th (Glamorgan) Battalion was part of the independent South Wales Brigade allocated to home defence, but volunteered for overseas service. It landed at Le Havre in October 1914 to work on the Lines of Communication on the Western Front. It later fought alongside the 1st Battalion with 28th Division at the Hohenzollern Redoubt and spent the rest of the war as the divisional pioneer battalion for 1st Division

==== New Armies ====
The 8th (Service) Battalion landed at ANZAC Cove as part of the 40th Brigade in the 13th (Western) Division in August 1915; after being evacuated from Gallipoli in December 1915 the battalion moved to Egypt and on to Mesopotamia in February 1916. Captain Edgar Myles, of the 8th (Service) Battalion, was awarded the Victoria Cross for his actions at the Siege of Kut in April 1916 during the Mesopotamian campaign.

The 9th (Service) Battalion landed at Boulogne-sur-Mer as part of the 58th Brigade in the 19th (Western) Division in July 1915 for service on the Western Front. The 10th (Service) Battalion (1st Rhondda) landed at Le Havre as part of the 114th Brigade in 38th (Welsh) Division in December 1915 for service on the Western Front. The 11th (Service) Battalion landed at Boulogne-sur-Mer as part of the 67th Brigade in the 22nd Division in September 1915 for service on the Western Front and then moved to Salonika in late 1915. Private Hubert William Lewis, of the 11th (Service) Battalion, was awarded the Victoria Cross for his actions at Evzonoi in Macedonia in October 1916 during the Macedonian campaign.

The 13th (Service) Battalion (2nd Rhondda), the 14th (Service) Battalion (Swansea) and the 15th (Service) Battalion (Carmarthenshire) landed at Le Havre as part of the 114th Brigade in the 38th (Welsh) Division in December 1915 for service on the Western Front. The 16th (Service) Battalion (Cardiff City) landed at Le Havre as part of the 115th Brigade in the 38th (Welsh) Division in December 1915 for service on the Western Front. The 17th (Service) Battalion (1st Glamorgan) and 18th (Service) Battalion (2nd Glamorgan) (both 'Bantam battalions') landed in France as part of the 119th Brigade in the 40th Division in June 1916 for service on the Western Front. The 19th (Service) Battalion (Glamorgan Pioneers) landed at Le Havre as pioneer battalion to the 38th (Welsh) Division in December 1915 for service on the Western Front. The 23rd (Service) Battalion (Welsh Pioneers) landed in Salonika as pioneer battalion to the 28th Division in July 1916.

==== War memorial ====
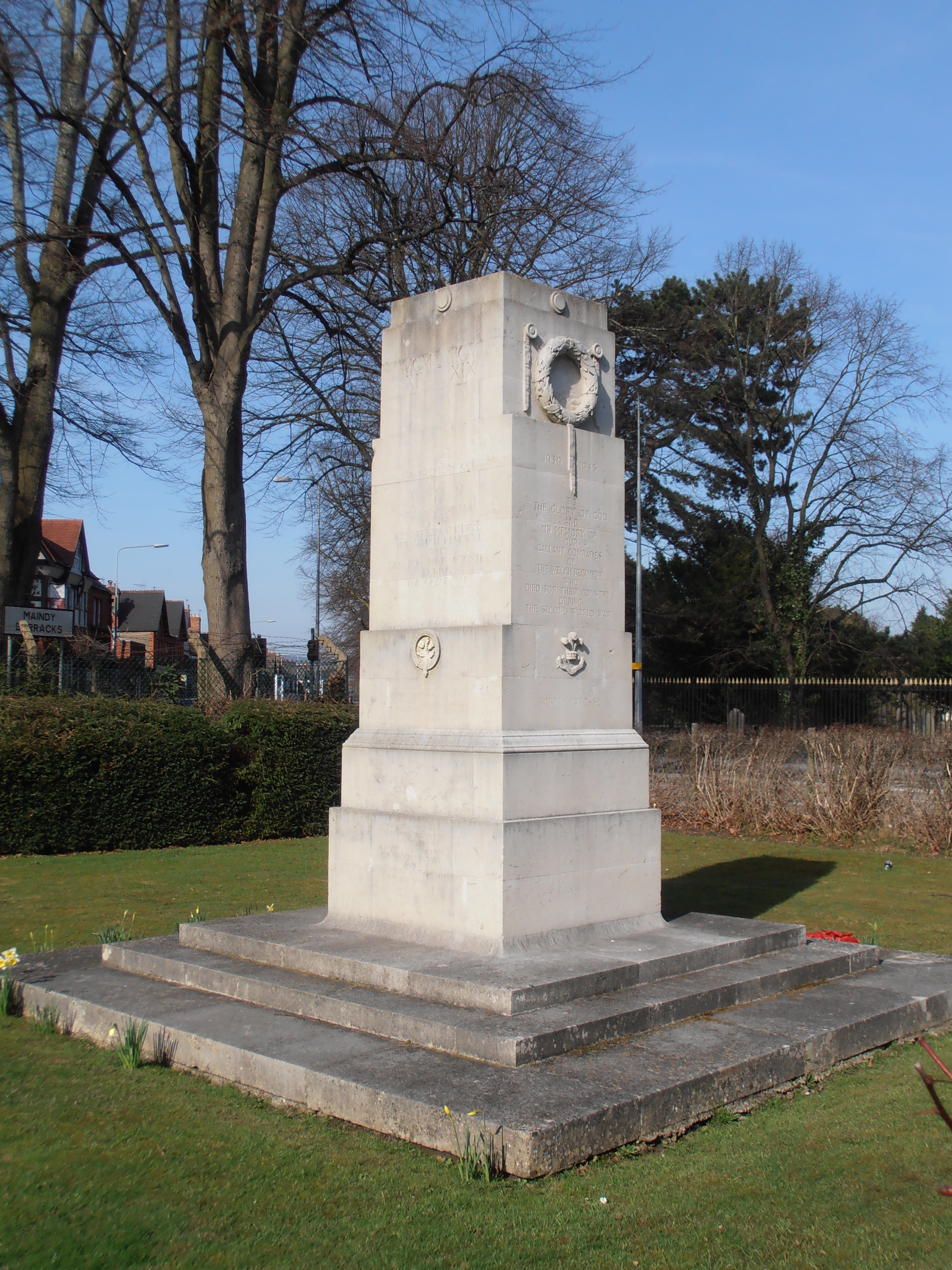
The Welch Regiment War Memorial at Maindy Barracks, Cardiff

After the First World War, the regiment commissioned the architect Sir Edwin Lutyens to design a war memorial as a tribute to their fallen. The memorials was originally planned to be built on the Western Front in Belgium but was instead erected outside the regiment's headquarters at Maindy Barracks in Cardiff. The memorial takes the form of squat cenotaph, following Lutyens' design of the famous Cenotaph on Whitehall in London.

=== Inter-war ===
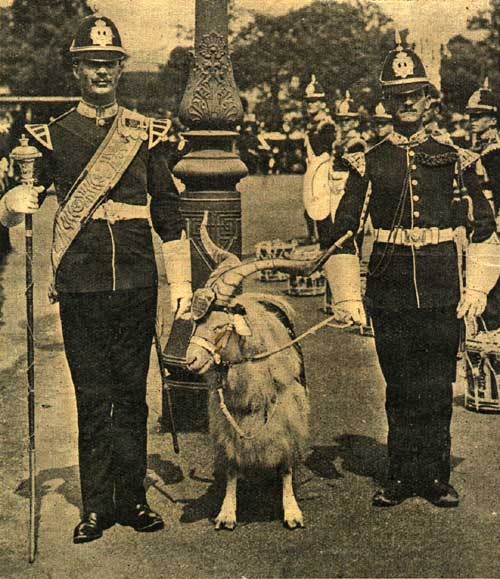
Welch Regiment mascot Taffy IV c. 1921

The 2nd Battalion was deployed to Ireland in 1920 while the 1st Battalion returned to British India and served there until 1924 when it moved to Waziristan. The 2nd Battalion moved to Shanghai in 1927 for service with the Shanghai Defence Force and then on to India in 1935. The 6th (Glamorgan) Battalion of the Territorial Army, which had absorbed the 7th (Cyclist) Battalion in 1921, was converted into a searchlight regiment in 1938 and was transferred to the Royal Artillery as 67th (Welch) Searchlight Regiment in 1940.

=== Second World War ===
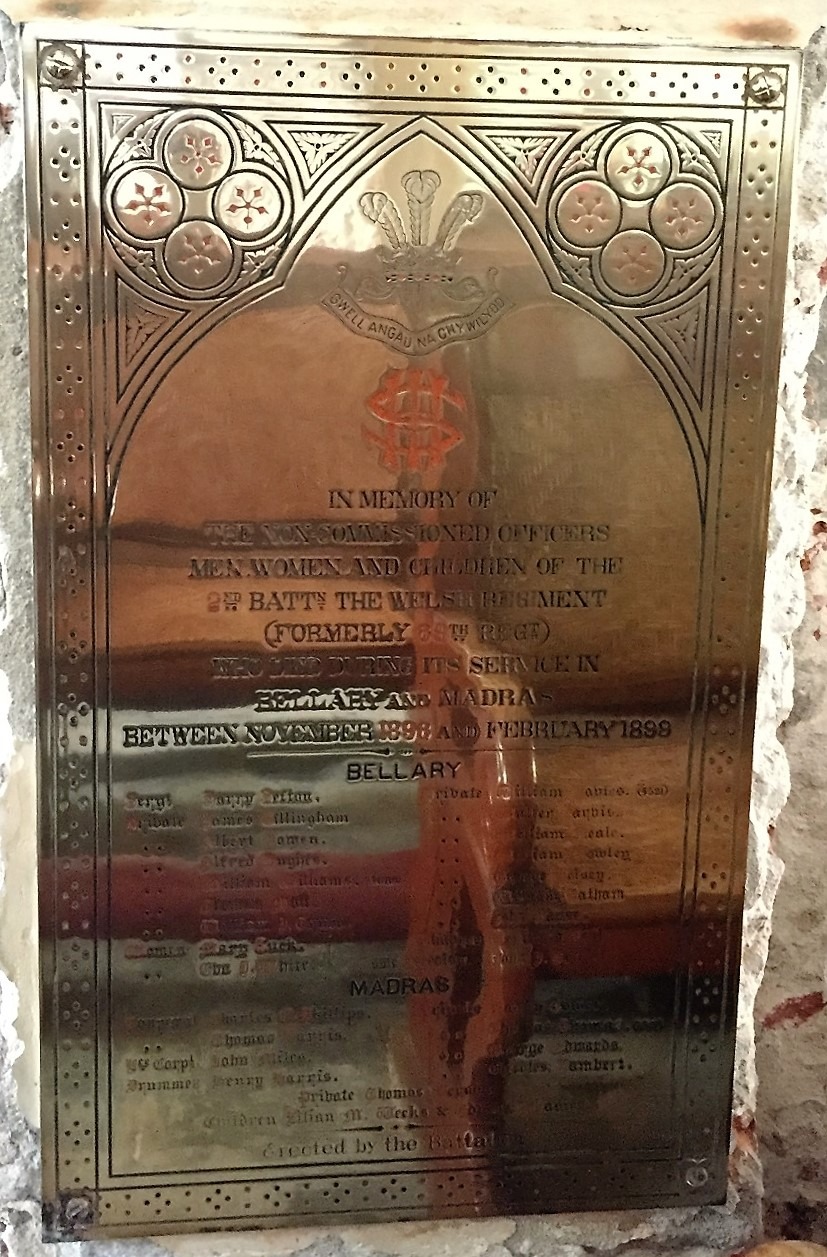
Welch Regiment Memorial, St. Mary's Church, Madras.

The 1st Battalion moved to Palestine in 1939 to play its part in operations connected with the 1936–39 Arab revolt in Palestine. The battalion first saw action in the Western Desert Campaign of 1940. The 1st Battalion landed in Crete in February but was overwhelmed by the enemy in fighting at Souda Bay in Chania and Sphakia Beach and had to be evacuated by the Royal Navy. Eventually the 1st Battalion was reformed in Egypt and joined the 5th Indian Infantry Brigade, part of the 4th Indian Infantry Division and moved back again to the Western Desert. In Crete alone the battalion had lost nearly 250 dead, with 400 being captured and the battalion was reduced to a mere 7 officers and 161 other ranks. They received a large draft of 700 officers and men. After heavy fighting in the area of Benghazi the 1st Battalion was again overrun in mid-1942 and again suffered heavy casualties when Erwin Rommel's Afrika Korps swept through Cyrenaica and Libya in the First Battle of El Alamein. Following a period of rest and training in Egypt and the Sudan the 1st Battalion was re-organized in early 1943 as 34th (Welch) Beach Brick and in July landed with the 50th (Northumbrian) Infantry Division, part of General Bernard Montgomery's British Eighth Army, during the invasion of Sicily in July.

In May 1944 the 1st Battalion received large numbers of replacements from retrained anti-aircraft gunners of the Royal Artillery and became an effective infantry battalion again. The battalion was now assigned to 168th (London) Infantry Brigade, replacing the now disbanded 10th Royal Berkshire Regiment and serving alongside 1st London Irish Rifles and 1st London Scottish, making the brigade a mixture of Irish, Scottish and Welsh. The 168th Brigade was part of the 56th (London) Division, which had just been severely mauled fighting at Anzio. In July the battalion landed in Italy and fought in the Italian Campaign and would remain there for the rest of the war. They took part in heavy fighting on the Gothic Line, one of many German defensive lines in Italy, and in the Croce area where the battalion, and the rest of the 56th Division, suffered heavy casualties. As a result of the casualties sustained, and a severe shortage of British infantry replacements in the Mediterranean theatre, 168th Brigade was disbanded and the 1st Battalion was reduced to a small cadre of 5 officers and 60 other ranks. In March 1945 the 1st Battalion was transferred to the 1st Guards Brigade, serving alongside the 3rd Grenadier Guards and 3rd Welsh Guards and replacing the disbanded 3rd Coldstream Guards, part of 6th Armoured Division, and remained with it until the end of the war. In April they took part in Operation Grapeshot which ended with the capture of thousands of prisoners of war and the surrender of the German Army in Italy on 2 May.

The 2nd Battalion had been retained in India but in October 1944 the battalion moved to Burma as part of the 62nd Indian Infantry Brigade attached to the 19th Indian Infantry Division where it joined the British Fourteenth Army, led by Bill Slim. The Battalion saw its bitterest fighting along the Taungoo-Mawchi Road where for a hundred miles, with deep jungle on either side, the Japanese defended vigorously all the way. In November the battalion crossed the Chindwin River at Sittang, captured Pinlebu and saw some very hard fighting on the Swebo Plain.

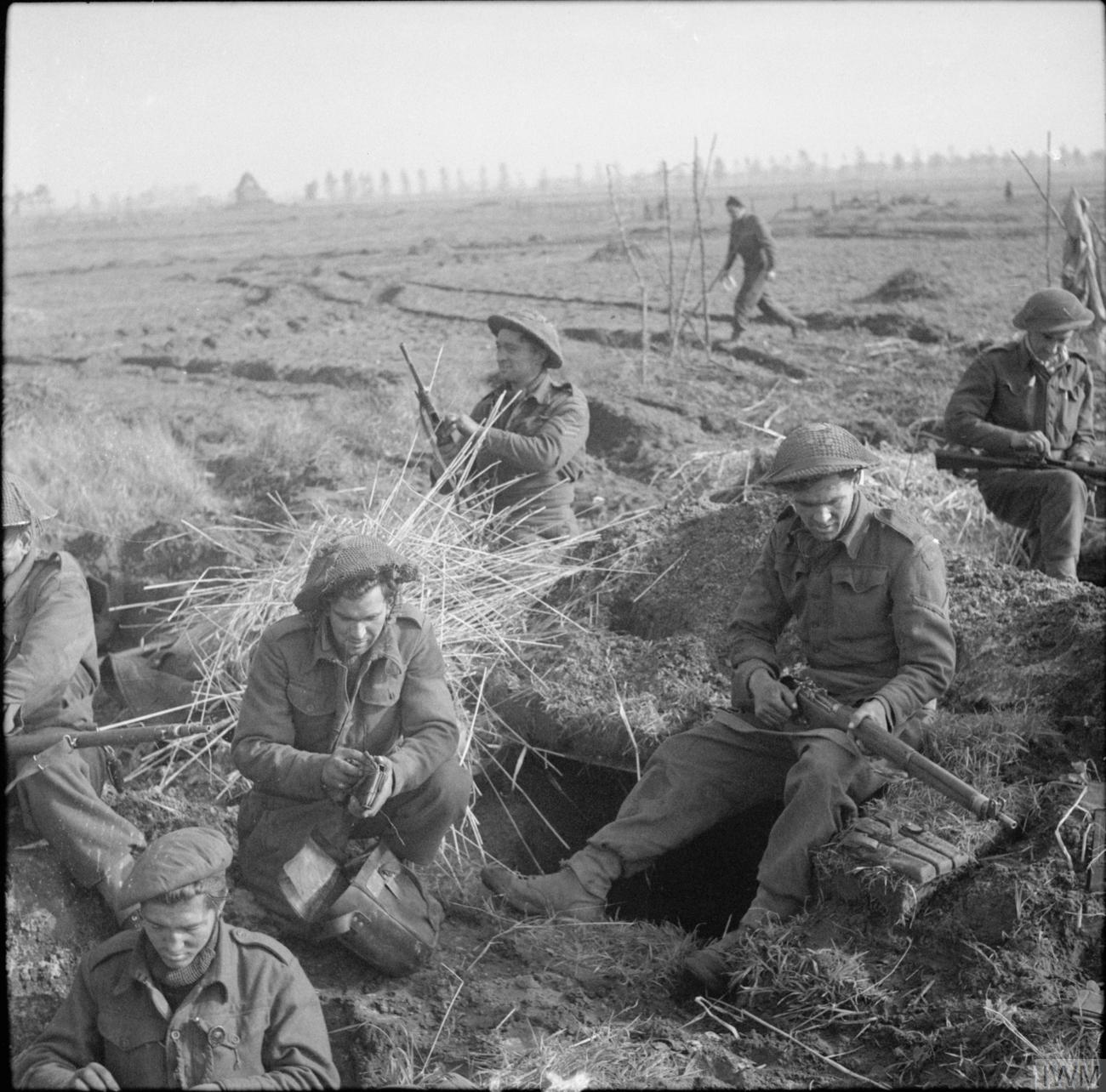
Men of the 4th Battalion, Welch Regiment clean their weapons outside 's-Hertogenbosch, the Netherlands, 25 October 1944.

The 4th Battalion was in Northern Ireland in the 160th Infantry Brigade attached to the 53rd (Welsh) Infantry Division. In June 1944 the battalion, under Lieutenant Colonel Charles Coleman, was, after many years of training, ordered to France to join the British Second Army in the Normandy Campaign. From the start of the campaign the 4th Battalion was involved in fierce fighting during the Battle for Caen, and around the Falaise Pocket, the Battle of the Bulge and the Battle of the Reichwald where it sustained very heavy casualties and involved some of the fiercest fighting in the North West Europe Campaign for British soldiers as they were up against determined German paratroopers.

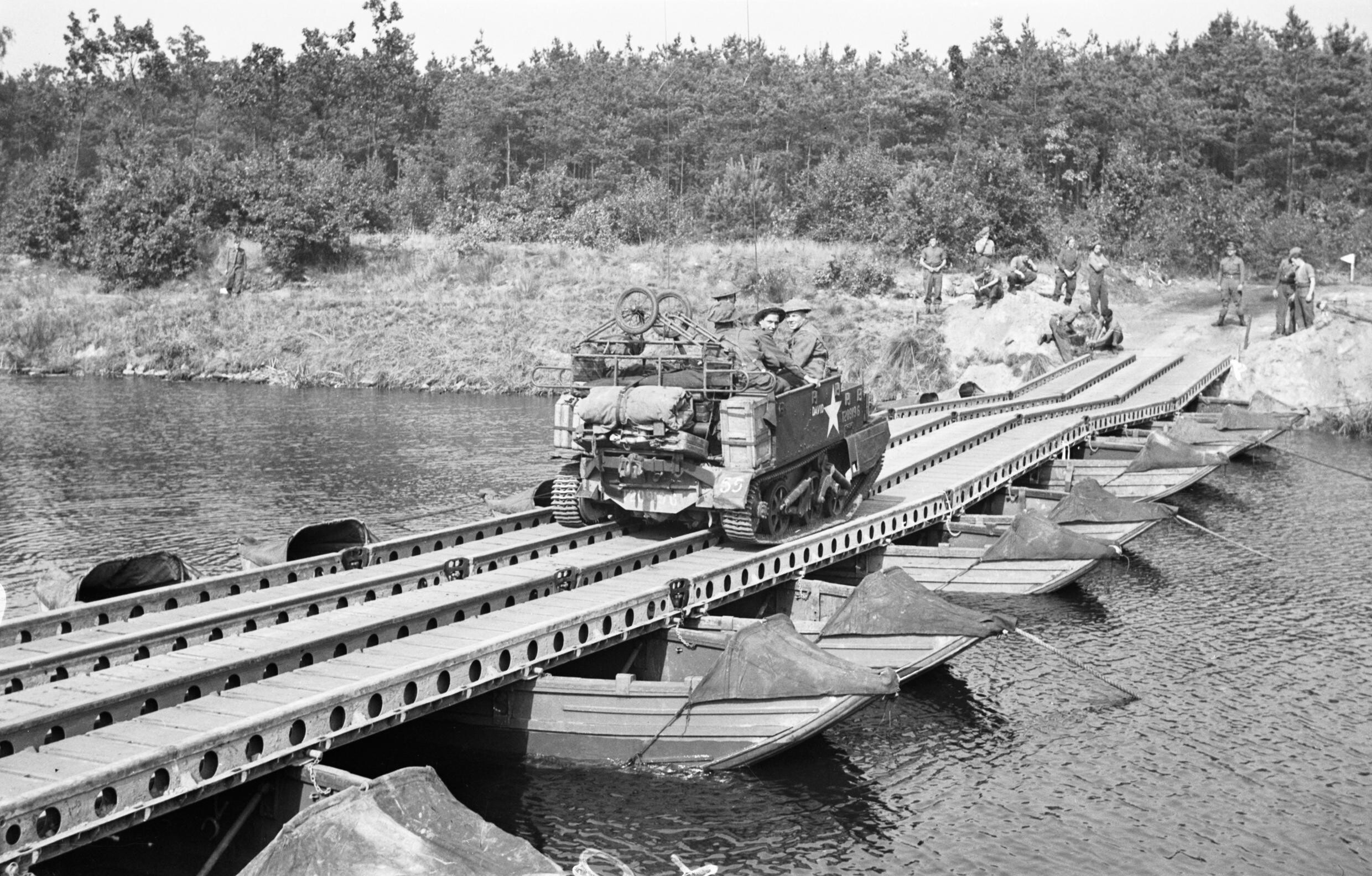
Universal Carriers of the 1/5th Battalion, Welch Regiment crossing the Meuse into the Netherlands, 20 September 1944.

Meanwhile, the 1/5th and 2/5th Battalions, mobilized at the same time as the 4th Battalion, were retained at home where the 2/5th also trained and prepared drafts for overseas although it remained at home throughout the whole war as a Home Defence battalion. The 1/5th Battalion, originally with the 160th Infantry Brigade, moved to Normandy in late June 1944 and fought alongside the 4th Battalion in the 53rd (Welsh) Division in the North West Europe Campaign distinguishing itself at 's-Hertogenbosch, the Falaise Gap, the Ardennes and the Reichwald Forest. In August 1944 the 1/5th Battalion was transferred from 160th Brigade to the 158th Infantry Brigade, still with 53rd (Welsh) Division. Some of the hardest fighting took place around the Falaise Gap where on 16 August 1944, near Balfour, Lieutenant Tasker Watkins of the 1/5th Battalion was awarded the Victoria Cross for supreme personal bravery and inspired leadership.

Around 1,100 officers and other ranks of the Welch Regiment were killed or died from wounds or sickness during the Second World War, with many more wounded.

=== Post-war ===
The 1st Battalion returned home in 1947 and was garrisoned at Malvern, Worcester, with the 2nd Battalion, which had returned from Burma. The 1st Battalion moved to Dering Lines in Brecon in February 1948 and amalgamated with the 2nd Battalion in June 1948. The Battalion moved to Sobraon Barracks in Colchester in October 1950 and was then deployed to Korea as part of the 29th British Infantry Brigade in the 1st Commonwealth Division in November 1951 for service in the Korean War.

The battalion moved to Hong Kong as part of the 27th Infantry Brigade in November 1952 and then returned home to Llanion Barracks in Pembroke Dock in 1954. It moved to Lüneburg in Germany as part of 10th Infantry Brigade in June 1956 before being deployed to Cyprus in October 1957. The battalion moved to North Africa in December 1958 and established its headquarters in Benghazi with company detachments at Derna, Marj and Al Adm and then returned to the United Kingdom the following year. The battalion was stationed at Brooke Barracks in Spandau from April 1961 where duties included guarding Rudolf Hess. The battalion returned to the United Kingdom and became the Demonstration Battalion of The School of Infantry, stationed first at Knook Camp in Heytesbury and then at the newly built Battlesbury Barracks in Warminster in 1965. For its final overseas posting the battalion moved to Stanley Fort on Hong Kong Island in June 1966. It then amalgamated with the South Wales Borderers to form the 1st Battalion the Royal Regiment of Wales in June 1969.

== Regimental holders of The Victoria Cross ==
(Prior to 1881)

- Lieutenant Ambrose Madden VC (Sergeant-Major in 41st (the Welsh) Regiment of Foot)
- General Sir Hugh Rowlands VC KCB (Captain in 41st (the Welsh) Regiment of Foot)

(Post 1881)

- Sergeant William Charles Fuller VC (Lance-Corporal in 2nd Bn)
- Private Hubert William Lewis VC (Private in 11th Bn)
- Captain Edgar Myles VC DSO (Second Lieutenant in 8th Bn)
- Major Sir Tasker Watkins VC GBE PC (Lieutenant in 1/5th Battalion)

== Battle honours ==
The regiment was awarded the following battle honours:

- From the 41st Regiment of Foot: Detroit, Queenstown, Miami, Niagara, Ava, Candahar 1842, Ghuznee 1842, Cabool 1842, Alma, Inkerman, Sevastopol
- From the 69th Regiment of Foot: Bourbon, Java, Waterloo, India
- Belleisle^{1}, Martinique 1762^{1}, The Saints^{2}, St Vincent 1797 ^{1}, Relief of Kimberley, Paardeberg, South Africa 1899–1902
- The Great War: Mons, Retreat from Mons, Marne 1914, Aisne 1914 '18, Ypres 1914 '15 '17, Langemarck 1914 '17, Gheluvelt, Nonne Bosschen, Givenchy 1914, Gravenstafel, Saint-Julien, Frezenberg, Bellewaarde, Aubers, Loos, Somme 1916 '18, Albert 1916 '18, Bazentin, Pozières, Flers-Courcelette, Morval, Ancre Heights, Ancre 1916 '18, Messines 1917 '18, Pilckem, Menin Road, Polygon Wood, Broodseinde, Poelcappelle, Passchendaele, Cambrai 1917 '18, Saint-Quentin, Bapaume 1918, Lys, Estaires, Hazebrouck, Bailleul, Kemmel, Béthune, Scherpenberg, Arras 1918, Drocourt-Quéant, Hindenburg Line, Épéhy, St. Quentin Canal, Beaurevoir, Selle, Valenciennes, Sambre, France and Flanders 1914–18, Struma, Doiran 1917 '18, Macedonia 1915–18, Suvla, Sari Bair, Landing at Suvla, Scimitar Hill, Gallipoli 1915, Egypt 1915–17, Gaza, El Mughar, Jerusalem, Jericho, Tell 'Asur, Megiddo, Nablus, Palestine 1917–18, Tigris 1916, Kut al Amara 1917, Baghdad, Mesopotamia 1916–18
- The Second World War: Falaise, Lower Maas, Reichswald, North-West Europe 1944-45, Benghazi, North Africa 1940–42, Sicily 1943, Coriano, Croce, Rimini Line, Ceriano Ridge, Argenta Gap, Italy 1943–45, Crete, Canea, Withdrawal to Sphakia, Middle East 1941, Kyaukmyaung Bridgehead, Maymyo, Rangoon Road, Sittang 1945, Burma 1944-45
- Post-War: Korean War 1951–52

From the above battle honours the following were actually borne on the Regimental and Queen's Colour:

- The Regimental Colour:

Belleisle, Martinique 1762, St. Vincent 1797, India, Bourbon, Java, Detroit, Queenstown, Miami, Niagara, Waterloo, Ava, Candahar 1842, Ghuznee 1842, Cabool 1842, Alma, Inkerman, Sevastopol, Relief of Kimberley, Paardeburg, South Africa 1899–1902, Korea 1951–52.

- The Queen's Colour:

Aisne 1914–18, Ypres 1914-15-17, Gheluvelt, Loos, Somme 1916–18, Pilkem, Cambrai 1917–18, Macedonia 1915–18, Gallipoli 1915, Gaza, Falaise, Lower Mass, Reichswald, Croce, Italy 1943–45, Crete, Canae, Kyaukmyaung Bridgehead, Sittang 1945, Burma 1944–45.

¹ Awarded for the services of the 69th Foot.

² Awarded in 1909 for the services of the 69th Foot, with the badge of a Naval Crown superscribed 12th April 1782.

== Regimental Colonels ==
Colonels of the regiment were:

The Welsh Regiment

- 1881–1883 (1st Battalion): Gen. Sir Richard England, GCB, KH (ex 41st Foot)
- 1881–1894 (2nd Battalion): Gen. David Elliott Mackirdy (ex 69th Foot)
- 1883–1894: Gen. Julius Edmund Goodwyn, CB
- 1894–1904: Gen. Francis Peyton, CB
- 1904–1918: Maj-Gen. William Allan
- 1918–1920: Maj-Gen. Sir Alexander Bruce Tulloch, KCB, CMG
- 1920–1941: Maj-Gen. Sir Thomas Owen Marden, KBE, CB, CMG

The Welch Regiment (1921)

- 1941–1949: Maj-Gen. Douglas Povah Dickinson, CB, DSO, OBE, MC
- 1949–1958: Maj-Gen. Cyril Ernest Napier Lomax, CB, CBE, DSO, MC
- 1958–1965: Lt-Gen. Sir Cyril Frederick Charles Coleman, KCB, CMG, DSO, OBE
- 1965–1969: Maj-Gen. Frank Hastings Brooke, CB, CBE, DSO
- 1969: Regiment amalgamated with The South Wales Borderers to form The Royal Regiment of Wales (24th/41st Foot)

== Sources ==
- Joslen, H. F. (2003) [1960]. Orders of Battle: Second World War, 1939–1945. Uckfield, East Sussex: Naval and Military Press. ISBN 978-1-84342-474-1.

| Preceded by 41st (Welch) Regiment of Foot | The Welch Regiment; 1881–1969 | Succeeded by Royal Regiment of Wales |
