= Woodroofe (surname) =

Woodroofe is a surname. Notable people with the surname include:

- Ernest Woodroofe (1912–2002), British businessman and former chairman of Unilever
- Grace Woodroofe, Australian guitarist
- Louise Woodroofe (1892–1996), American Fauvist painter
- Michael Woodroofe (1940–2022), American statistician

== See also ==
- Woodrooffe
