= William Allan (British Army officer) =

British general

Major-General William Allan CIE FRSE
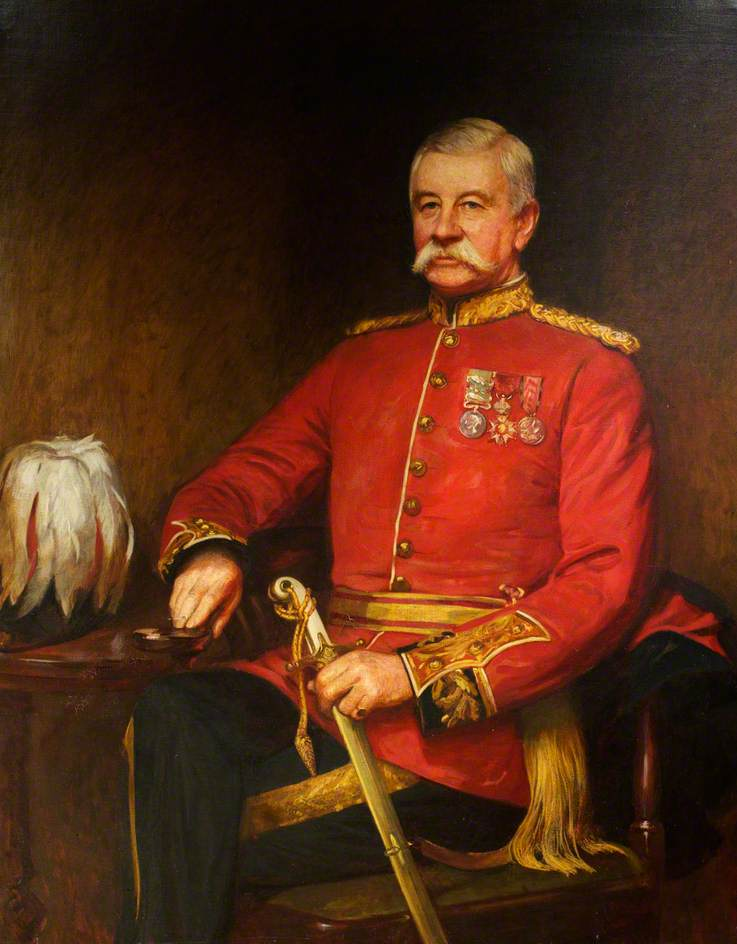
- Born: 22 June 1832
- Died: 12 July 1918 (aged 86)

Major-General William Allan CIE FRSE (22 June 1832 – 12 July 1918) was a British general who served in the Crimean War. He was regimental Colonel of the Welsh Regiment.

== Life ==
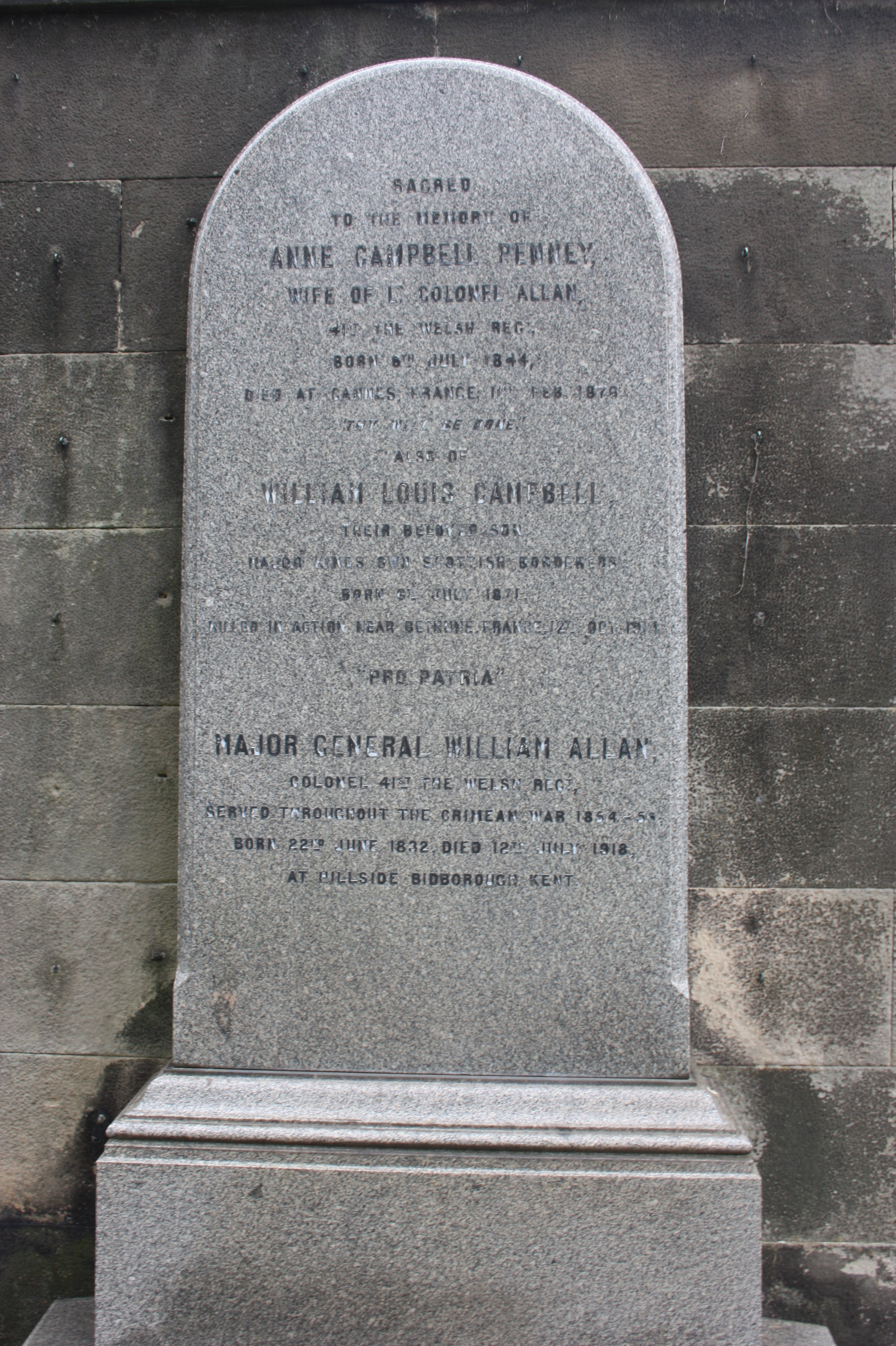
The grave of Major General William Allan, Dean Cemetery

He was born on 22 June 1832.

From 1854 he served as a Lieutenant in the 41st Battalion Welsh Regiment in the Crimean War. Serving in the entire war he was at the Battle of Alma, Siege of Sebastopol and the Battle of Inkerman.

Promoted to major general in December 1889, he retired to 43 Manor Place in Edinburgh's West End.

He died on 12 July 1918 in Bidborough in Kent. He is buried with his wife in Dean Cemetery in Edinburgh. The grave lies against the north wall of the Victorian north extension.

== Family ==
He was married to Anne Campbell Penney (1844–1876).

Their son Major William Louis Campbell Allan (1871–1914) was killed near Bethune in the opening months of the First World War.

== Artistic recognition ==
He was portrayed in uniform by Daniel A. Wehrschmidt. The portrait is held by the Welsh Regiment Museum at Brecon Beacons.

== Publications ==
- Crimean Letters
