= 114th Brigade (United Kingdom) =

Military unit

The 114th Brigade was an infantry brigade formation of the British Army during the First World War. It was raised as part of the new army also known as Kitchener's Army and assigned to the 38th (Welsh) Division.

The brigade re-formed in the Second World War as the 114th Infantry Brigade, formed as a 2nd Line duplicate of 160th Infantry Brigade.

== First World War formation ==
The infantry battalions did not all serve at once, but all were assigned to the brigade during the war.

- 10th (Service) Battalion, Welsh Regiment (1st Rhondda)
- 13th (Service) Battalion, Welsh Regiment (2nd Rhondda)
- 14th (Service) Battalion, Welsh Regiment (Swansea)
- 15th (Service) Battalion, Welsh Regiment (Carmarthen)
- 114th Machine Gun Company
- 114th Trench Mortar Battery

== Second World War ==
- 5th Battalion, King's Shropshire Light Infantry
- 1st Brecknockshire Battalion, South Wales Borderers
- 2nd Battalion, Herefordshire Regiment
- 114th Infantry Brigade Anti-Tank Company (formed 10 July 1940, disbanded 9 January 1942)

== Sources ==
- Joslen, H. F. (2003) [1960]. Orders of Battle: Second World War, 1939–1945. Uckfield, East Sussex: Naval and Military Press. ISBN 978-1-84342-474-1.
