= Sidney Woodroffe =

Sidney Clayton Woodroffe
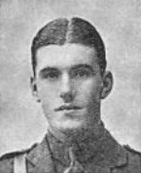
- Born: 17 December 1895; Lewes, Sussex, England
- Died: 30 July 1915 (aged 19); Hooge, Flanders, Belgium
- Relatives: Kenneth Woodroffe (brother)
- Military career
- Allegiance: United Kingdom
- Branch: British Army
- Service years: 1914–1915
- Rank: Second Lieutenant
- Units: Rifle Brigade (The Prince Consort's Own)
- Conflicts: World War I †
- Awards: Victoria Cross

Second Lieutenant Sidney Clayton Woodroffe VC (17 December 1895 − 30 July 1915) was a British Army officer and an English recipient of the Victoria Cross (VC), the highest and most prestigious award for gallantry in the face of the enemy that can be awarded to British and Commonwealth forces.

== Details ==
Woodroffe was born in Lewes, East Sussex and was educated at Marlborough College.

He was 19 years old, and a second lieutenant in the 8th Battalion, The Rifle Brigade (Prince Consort's Own), British Army during the First World War when the following deed took place for which he was awarded the VC.

On 30 July 1915 at Hooge, Belgium, when the enemy had broken through the centre of our front trenches, Second Lieutenant Woodroffe's position was heavily attacked with bombs from the flank and subsequently from the rear, but he managed to defend his post until all his bombs were exhausted. He then skillfully withdrew his remaining men and immediately led them forward in a counter-attack under intense rifle and machine-gun fire, and was killed whilst in the act of cutting the wire obstacles in the open.

2nd Lt. Woodroffe has no known grave and is commemorated at the Menin Gate in Ypres. His entry is possibly unique, in that the postnomial VC appears before his name, and was most likely added at a later date. He is also listed on the Lewes War Memorial.

== The medal ==
This medal is in the Lord Ashcroft V.C. Trust Collection in the Imperial War Museum.

== Further information ==
War poet Charles Sorley, a contemporary of Woodroffe at Marlborough, dedicated a poem to Woodroffe entitled "In Memoriam SCW VC".

He was the brother of Kenneth Woodroffe, a cricketer who played for Hampshire and Sussex. Kenneth was also killed in 1915 whilst serving with the Rifle Brigade.

== Bibliography ==
- The Register of the Victoria Cross (This England, 1997)
- Monuments to Courage (David Harvey, 1999)
- VCs of the First World War (Peter F. Batchelor & Christopher Matson, 1999)
