= John Grimshaw (VC) =

English Victoria Cross recipient (1893-1980)

John Elisha Grimshaw
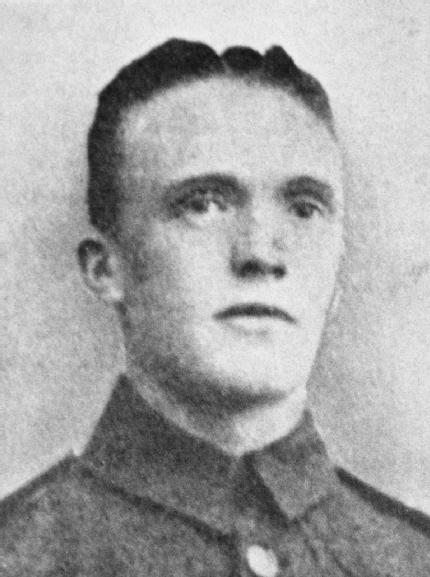
- Born: 20 January 1893; Abram, Lancashire, England
- Died: 20 July 1980 (age 87); Isleworth, Middlesex, England
- Military career
- Allegiance: United Kingdom
- Branch: British Army; British Indian Army
- Service years: 1912 – 1934
- Rank: Lieutenant-Colonel
- Units: The Lancashire Fusiliers
- Conflicts: World War I
- Awards: Victoria Cross

Lieutenant-Colonel John Elisha Grimshaw VC (20 January 1893 – 20 July 1980) was an English recipient of the Victoria Cross, the highest and most prestigious award for gallantry in the face of the enemy that can be awarded to British and Commonwealth forces.

== Early life ==
John Elisha Grimshaw was descended from one of the lines of Grimshaws at Abram, Lancashire, He was born in 1893 and was employed as a carpenter at Cross & Tetley's Collieries in the Wigan coalfield before enlisting in the Lancashire Fusiliers, British Army, in August 1912. He served with his battalion in India before the outbreak of the First World War.

== Military service ==
Grimshaw was 22 years old, and a lance-corporal signaller in C Company of the 1st Battalion, when he took part in the landing on W Beach on 25 April 1915 west of Cape Helles, Gallipoli, Turkey, at the opening of the Battle of Gallipoli. His job was to maintain communications between the units which had landed and the headquarters for the landing on HMS Euryalus. During the landing, the three companies and the Headquarters of the 1st Battalion, Lancashire Fusiliers, were met by a very heavy and effective fire from the company of Ottoman Empire troops defending the beach. This caused 533 casualties out of the 950 men who attempted to land. The survivors, however, rushed up and cut the wire entanglements notwithstanding the terrific fire from the enemy and after overcoming supreme difficulties, the cliffs were gained and the position maintained.

Grimshaw's own account said that

In boats we got within 200 or 300 yards from the shore when the Turks opened a terrible fire. Sailors were shot dead at their oars. With rifles held over our heads we struggled through the barbed wire in the water to the beach and fought a way to the foot of the cliffs leaving the biggest part of our men dead and wounded.

Grimshaw was awarded a Distinguished Conduct Medal for his actions during the landing.

Grimshaw, along with Cuthbert Bromley, William Kenealy, Alfred Joseph Richards, Frank Edward Stubbs and Richard Raymond Willis, had originally been nominated for a Victoria Cross by Major Bishop, the battalion's commanding officer, after consulting "the officers who happened to be with him at the time and who did not include either of the officers awarded the Cross". The recommendation endorsed by Hunter-Weston and Hamilton but was not proceeded with by the War Office.

In August, Hunter-Weston made a second recommendation for three of the men; under the original 1856 warrant establishing the award up to 4 VCs could be awarded as a result of balloting the units involved; and Keneally, Richards and Willis, were awarded the medal having been selected by the surviving privates, NCOs and officers respectively.

However, Brigadier Owen Wolley-Dod, who was a member of Hunter-Weston's general staff and a Lancashire Fusilier himself, and who had landed on the beach shortly after noon continued pressing for more awards to be made. Eventually the other three men, including Grimshaw, were finally awarded the medal. The awards were published in the London Gazette on 13 March 1917, with an identical citation to the original three men. Grimshaw had his DCM cancelled and replaced with a Victoria Cross. The courage of the six men awarded the medal as a result of the landing was hailed in the Press as "6 VCs before breakfast".

Meanwhile, Grimshaw had been evacuated from Gallipoli suffering from frostbite and, in 1916, posted to Hull as a rifle instructor. Whilst at Hull, he married Margaret Stout, with whom he later had two children. He was subsequently sent with his battalion to France where, as a sergeant, he was commissioned in 1917. In 1918 he was posted to the First Battalion of the 75th Carnatic Infantry in India, and promoted to lieutenant, before rejoining the Lancashire Fusiliers in 1920 and retiring in 1921. In 1934 he was appointed the Army's Chief Recruiting Officer in the Northumbrian Area and promoted to lieutenant-colonel; he later held the same appointment in East Anglia. He died on 20 July 1980 at Isleworth, London, and was cremated at the South West London Crematorium in Hanwell, Middlesex.

== Bibliography ==
- Snelling, Stephen (2012) [1995]. Gallipoli. VCs of the First World War. The History Press. ISBN 978-0752456539.
