= Cuthbert Lucas =

British Army general (1879–1958)

Major-General Cuthbert Lucas CB CMG DSO DL
- Born: 1 March 1879
- Died: 7 April 1956 (age 77)
- Military career
- Allegiance: United Kingdom
- Branch: British Army
- Service years: 1898–1932
- Rank: Major-General
- Unit: Royal Berkshire Regiment
- Commands: 87th Brigade; Machine Gun Corps Training Centre; 4th Division; 17th Brigade
- Conflicts: Second Boer War; World War I; Gallipoli campaign; Battle of the Somme; Irish War of Independence
- Awards: Companion of the Order of the Bath; Companion of the Order of St Michael and St George; Distinguished Service Order

Major-General Cuthbert Henry Tindall Lucas, CB, CMG, DSO, DL (1 March 1879 – 7 April 1956) was a British Army officer who commanded the 4th Division during the final months of World War I, and also served in the Second Boer War and the Irish War of Independence, during which he was captured by the Irish Republican Army (IRA).

== Early life ==
Lucas was born in Hitchin, Hertfordshire, on 1 March 1879. He later attended Marlborough College and the Royal Military College, Sandhurst.

== Military career ==
Lucas was commissioned as a second lieutenant into 2nd Battalion, the Royal Berkshire Regiment, on 7 May 1898.

He served with the battalion in South Africa during the Second Boer War from 1899 to 1902, taking part in operations in the Orange Free State from February to July 1900, in Transvaal from July to November 1900, and later in Cape Colony south of Orange River. He was promoted to lieutenant, on augmentation, on 1 August 1900, while in South Africa.

After the end of the war in June 1902, Lucas and the rest of the 2nd battalion was sent to Egypt, where they arrived on the SS Dominion in November 1902. He later served in the Egyptian Army and Sudan Civil Service. He was seconded from his regiment in order to attend the Staff College, Camberley from January 1913 onwards and was still there upon the outbreak of World War I in the summer of 1914.

He served in the war, initially with the British Expeditionary Force on the Western Front. Promoted to brevet major in February 1915, he later fought in the Gallipoli campaign in 1915 where he was promoted to temporary brigadier general in August and succeeded W. R. Marshall in command of the 87th Infantry Brigade of the 29th Division. He was promoted once again to temporary brigadier general in October and to brevet lieutenant colonel and led the brigade during the Battle of the Somme in 1916 and into 1917 before becoming commandant of the Machine Gun Corps Training Centre in 1918. He was promoted to temporary major general and appointed general officer commanding (GOC) of the 4th Division in October 1918, during the closing stages of the war.

On 30 June 1919, Lucas, promoted on 1 January 1919 to brevet colonel, was appointed a deputy lieutenant of the county of Hertfordshire. He was made commander of the 17th Infantry Brigade in Ireland, and of Fermoy Barracks, on 30 October 1919, the same date he was promoted to substantive colonel, and on 26 June 1920, during the Irish War of Independence, he was captured by the Irish Republican Army (IRA) while he was fishing on the Munster Blackwater near Fermoy along with Colonels Tyrell and Danford. After Danford was wounded during an unsuccessful attempt to escape from a moving car the same day, the volunteers freed Tyrell to attend to Danford's wounds. Both Colonels were subsequently taken to a military hospital at Fermoy.

General Lucas was subsequently held in West Limerick and East Clare.

A letter from his wife, announcing the birth of their child, and addressed simply "to the IRA", was delivered to him and his captors allowed a subsequent exchange of letters between the couple. His letters home remain in the possession of his descendants and were shown on an episode of the BBC Television programme Antiques Roadshow.

The IRA moved him to East Limerick from where Lucas escaped four weeks later. It is believed his captors purposely relaxed the guard to allow him to escape rather than be faced with the possibility of executing him. While being transferred from Pallas RIC barracks to Tipperary military barracks in a routine army patrol they were ambushed and Lucas received a slight injury.

In 2014 Barbara Scully, a granddaughter of one of the IRA volunteers involved, George Power, published his recollections to his family of the kidnap in the Irish Times. This brought a friendly reply from General Lucas' granddaughter, Ruth Wheeler, in which she stated that General Lucas risked a court martial for stating that during his kidnap and time in captivity he was treated as “a gentleman by gentlemen” and was held by “delightful people".

Ireland's Defence Forces have published online Bureau of Military History witness statements by the IRA volunteers involved in the kidnap, as well as those who guarded General Lucas while he was held as a prisoner of war.

In 2020 Lucas' granddaughter, Ruth Wheeler, and other members of the Lucas family published the letters he wrote and received while in captivity online. Limerick Councillor Emmett O'Brien and other local people in March 2019 announced an intent to re-enact the capture, imprisonment, and release of General Lucas on the anniversary in 2020.

Lucas became Assistant Adjutant General at Aldershot Command in 1924 and served with the staff at General Headquarters, British Army of the Rhine from 1927 before he retired to Stevenage in 1932. He died on 7 April 1956 and is buried in Graveley, Hertfordshire.

== Family ==
He married Joan Holdsworth in October 1917, who died on 6 September 1979 and is also buried in Graveley, Hertfordshire.

Military offices
Preceded by Louis Lipsett	GOC 4th Division; 1918–1919	Succeeded by Cameron Shute
