= William Kenealy =

Recipient of the Victoria Cross

William Stephen Kenealy
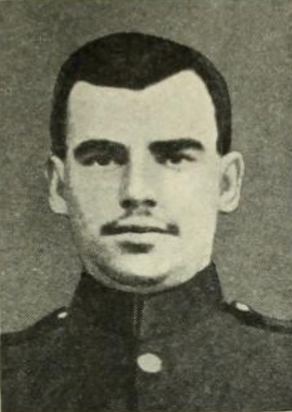
- Born: 26 December 1886; Wexford, County Wexford, Ireland
- Died: 29 June 1915 (aged 28) near Cape Helles, Gallipoli, Ottoman Turkey
- Burial place: Lancashire Landing Cemetery, Gallipoli Peninsula
- Military career
- Allegiance: United Kingdom
- Branch: British Army
- Service years: 1909–1915
- Rank: Lance Sergeant
- Service number: 1809
- Units: Lancashire Fusiliers
- Conflicts: World War I: Gallipoli campaign; Landing at Cape Helles †
- Awards: Victoria Cross
- Other work: Coal miner

Lance Sergeant William Stephen Kenealy VC, (26 December 1886 – 29 June 1915) was an Irish recipient of the Victoria Cross, the highest and most prestigious award for gallantry in the face of the enemy that can be awarded to British and Commonwealth forces.

== Biography ==
Born in Wexford, his father John was a colour sergeant in the Royal Irish Regiment. When his father retired from the army, the family moved to the district of Ashton-in-Makerfield, Lancashire where his father worked as a check-weigher at Bryn Hall Colliery. Kenealy became a coal miner at age 13. Ten years later, he enlisted into the army, signing up for 7 years. He joined the 1st Battalion, Lancashire Fusiliers, British Army as a private in during the First World War.

=== Citation ===
On 25 April 1915 west of Cape Helles, Gallipoli, Ottoman Turkey, Kenealy was 28 years old when he performed an act of bravery for which he was awarded the Victoria Cross.

On 25th April, 1915, three companies, and the Headquarters of the 1st Bn. Lancashire Fusiliers, in effecting a landing on the Gallipoli Peninsula to the West of Cape Helles, were met by a very deadly fire from hidden machine guns which caused a great number of casualties. The survivors, however, rushed up to and cut the wire entanglements, notwithstanding the terrific fire from the enemy, and after overcoming supreme difficulties, the cliffs were gained and the position maintained. Amongst the many very gallant officers and men engaged in this most hazardous undertaking, Capt. Willis, Serjt. Richards, and Pte. Kenealy have been selected by their comrades as having performed the most signal acts of bravery and devotion to duty.

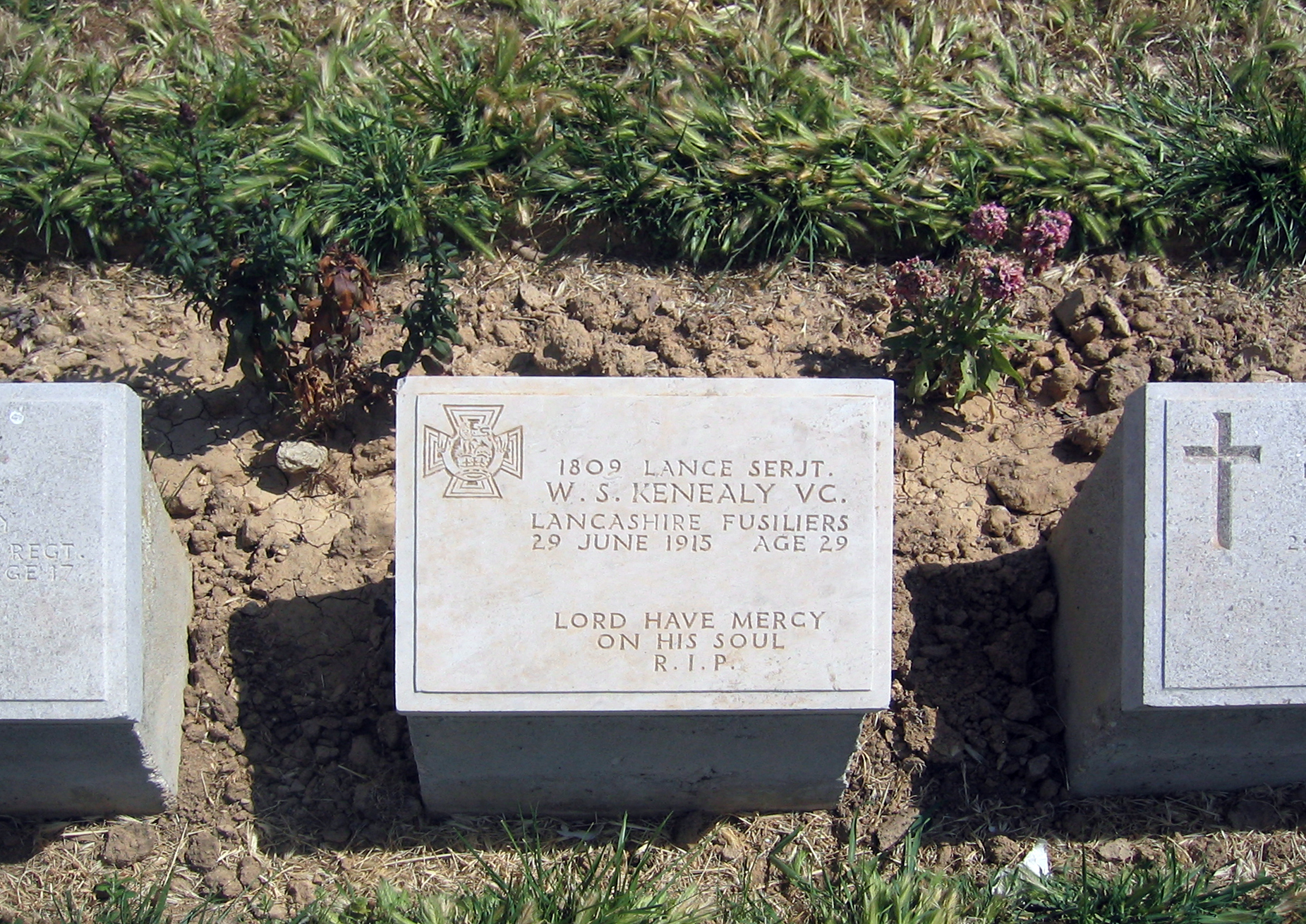
William Kenealy's grave at Lancashire Landing Cemetery, Gallipoli Peninsula

Kenealy was one of the six members of the regiment elected by their colleagues in the regiment for the award, and described in the press as "six VC's before breakfast". Lieutenant-General Sir Ian Hamilton, the overall Allied army commander at Gallipoli ordered that the beach be renamed Lancashire Landing because of his conviction that "no finer feat of arms has ever been achieved by the British Soldier – or any other soldier – than the storming of these beaches".

The other five members of the regiment who received the award as a result of the landing were Cuthbert Bromley, John Elisha Grimshaw, Alfred Joseph Richards, Frank Edward Stubbs and Richard Raymond Willis.

Shortly afterwards he was promoted to corporal and then lance-sergeant. He was seriously wounded in the Battle of Gully Ravine on 28 June 1915 and died the next day. Kenealy is buried at Lancashire Landing Cemetery on the Gallipoli Peninsula.
