= James Sutcliffe =

English cricketer and Royal Marines officer

Personal information
- Full name: James Frederick Sutcliffe
- Born: 14 December 1876; Chatham, Kent, England
- Died: 14 July 1915 (aged 38); Cape Helles, Gallipoli, Ottoman Empire
- Batting: Right-handed

Domestic team information
- Years: Team
- 1911: Hampshire

Career statistics
Competition	First-class
Matches	1
Runs scored	24
Batting average	12.00
100s/50s	–/–
Top score	16
Catches/stumpings	–/–
- Source: Cricinfo, 9 January 2010

James Frederick Sutcliffe (14 December 1876 — 14 July 1915) was an English first-class cricketer and Royal Marines officer.

The son of James Sutcliffe and his wife, Alice, he was born in December 1876 at Chatham, Kent. He followed his father into the Portsmouth Battalion Royal Marines, initially serving as a non-commissioned officer. Sutcliffe was a well known cricketer in Gosport, and later made a single appearance in first-class cricket for Hampshire against Worcestershire at Worcester in the 1911 County Championship. Playing as a middle order batsman, he was dismissed for 16 runs by George Simpson-Hayward in Hampshire's first innings, while in their second innings he was dismissed for 8 runs by John Cuffe.

Sutcliffe served in the Royal Marines in the First World War. He was wounded in action in May 1915, at which point he held the warrant officer rank of sergeant major, with a commission to lieutenant coming in the same month. Shortly after he travelled with his battalion to take part in the Gallipoli campaign, where he was killed in action in on or around 14 July 1915, with his body never being discovered or identified. His death was described as a "great loss" to the Portsmouth Cathedral choir. He was survived by his wife, Gladys Rosine Mary nee Mills, whom he married in 1912, and their son, James Denis. Sutcliffe was commemorated at the Helles Memorial and on the war memorial outside St Thomas's Church in Old Portsmouth, which in 1923 became Portsmouth Cathedral.
