= Richard Raymond Willis =

English Victoria Cross recipient (1876–1966)

Richard Raymond Willis VC
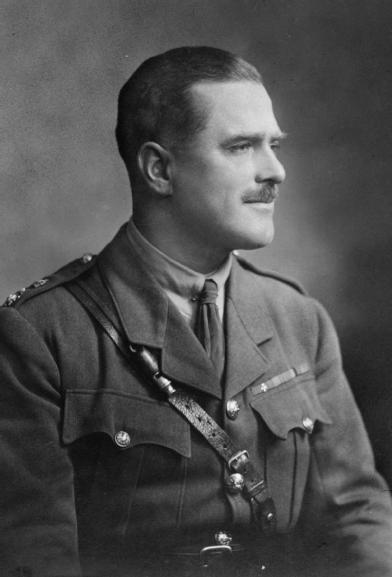
- Born: 13 October 1876; Woking, Surrey, England
- Died: 9 February 1966 (aged 89); Cheltenham, Gloucestershire, England
- Burial place: Cheltenham Crematorium
- Military career
- Allegiance: UK
- Branch: British Army
- Service years: 1897–1920
- Rank: Major
- Units: The Lancashire Fusiliers
- Conflicts: Mahdist War; First World War; Battle of Gallipoli
- Awards: Victoria Cross

Major Richard Raymond Willis VC (13 October 1876 – 9 February 1966) was an English recipient of the Victoria Cross, the highest and most prestigious award for gallantry in the face of the enemy that can be awarded to British and Commonwealth forces.

== Early career ==
Willis from Woking, Surrey, was educated at Harrow School and the Royal Military College, Sandhurst. He was commissioned in 1897, joined the 2nd Battalion of the Lancashire Fusiliers in India, then was posted with them to the Sudan for the Mahdist War.

He was an active freemason, and member of several lodges.

== First World War ==
Willis was 38 years old and a captain in the 1st Battalion the Lancashire Fusiliers, during the First World War, when the following deed took place for which he was awarded the Victoria Cross.

On 25 April 1915 west of Cape Helles, Gallipoli, Turkey, three companies and the Headquarters of the 1st Battalion, Lancashire Fusiliers, when landing on W Beach, were met by a very deadly fire from hidden machine-guns which caused a large number of casualties. The survivors, however, rushed up and cut the wire entanglements notwithstanding the terrific fire from the enemy and after overcoming supreme difficulties, the cliffs were gained and the position maintained.

Willis was one of the six members of the regiment elected for the award, the others being Cuthbert Bromley, John Elisha Grimshaw, William Kenealy, Alfred Joseph Richards and Frank Edward Stubbs. Willis later achieved the rank of major in September 1915.

His VC is displayed at the Fusilier Museum in Bury, Greater Manchester, and, under the auspices of This England magazine, a bronze memorial plaque was unveiled by his daughter at Cheltenham Crematorium in September 2002.

== Bibliography ==
- Snelling, Stephen (2012) [1995]. Gallipoli. VCs of the First World War. The History Press. ISBN 978-0752456539.
