= Cecil Palmer =

English cricketer and soldier

Personal information
- Full name: Cecil Howard Palmer
- Born: 14 July 1873; Eastbourne, Sussex, England
- Died: 26 July 1915 (aged 42); Gallipoli, Ottoman Empire
- Batting: Right-handed

Domestic team information
- Years: Team
- 1899-1907: Hampshire
- 1904: Worcestershire

Career statistics
Competition	First-class
Matches	9
Runs scored	380
Batting average	23.75
100s/50s	–/1
Top score	75*
Catches/stumpings	2/–
- Source: Cricinfo, 8 November 2022

Cecil Howard Palmer (14 July 1873 — 26 July 1915) was an English first-class cricketer and British Army officer.

The son of The Reverend James Howard Palmer and his wife, Marian, he was born at Eastbourne in July 1873. Palmer was educated at Radley College, where he played for the college cricket team. From there, he was commissioned into the York and Lancaster Regiment and as a second lieutenant in May 1892, before transferring to the Worcestershire Regiment in June 1894. He was promoted to lieutenant in February 1897 and captain in June 1900. While garrisoned at Aldershot, Palmer made his debut in first-class cricket for Hampshire against Sussex at Hove in the 1899 County Championship, with him playing a further match that season against Yorkshire.

Soon after he went to South Africa with the Worcestershire Regiment to take part in the Second Boer War, during which he was mentioned in dispatches and was decorated with the Queen's South Africa Medal. He returned to England in 1901 and was appointed aide-de-camp to Temporary Major-General R. H. Murray at Aldershot. He returned to play for Hampshire in 1901, making two appearances in the County Championship. His next appearances in first-class cricket came in 1904, when unusually he played for more than one county. He made one appearance for Worcestershire against Oxford University, making his highest first-class score of 75 not out in the match. Later that season he made three appearances in the County Championship for Hampshire, before making a final appearance in the 1907 County Championship against Warwickshire. In nine first-class matches, Palmer scored 380 runs at an average of 23.75.

In the Worcestershire Regiment, he was appointed an adjutant for the 1st Volunteer Battalion, Worcestershire Regiment. Following the Haldane Reforms the 1st Volunteer Battalion became the 7th Battalion, with his adjutancy carrying across to the 7th and his appointment as an adjutant lasted until November 1909. Palmer was promoted to major in January 1912.

He served in the First World War, being placed in command of the 9th (Service) Battalion of the Royal Warwickshire Regiment, a recently raised unit of Kitchener's Army, in August 1914, simultaneously being appointed an acting lieutenant colonel. He saw action in the Gallipoli campaign, taking part in the landing at Cape Helles on 13 July 1915. Just under a fortnight later, he was killed by an Ottoman sniper on 26 July 1915 close to Hill Q. He is commemorated at the Helles Memorial.
