= 86th Brigade (United Kingdom) =

Military unit

The 86th Brigade was a formation of the British Army. It was originally formed from regular army battalions serving away from home in the British Empire. It was assigned to the 29th Division and served on the Western Front and the Gallipoli Campaign and in Egypt during the First World War.

== Order of Battle ==
The following units served with the brigade at various time during the war:

- 2nd Battalion, Royal Fusiliers
- 1st Battalion, Lancashire Fusiliers
- 1st Battalion, Royal Munster Fusiliers
- 1st Battalion, Royal Dublin Fusiliers
- 2/3rd Battalion, London Regiment – attached 24 September 1915 to January 1916
- 16th (Service) Battalion, Middlesex Regiment (Public Schools)
- 1st Battalion, Royal Guernsey Light Infantry
- 86th Machine Gun Company
- 86th Trench Mortar Battery

== Commanders ==
Commanding officers
Rank	Name	Date appointed	Notes
Lieutenant-Colonel	H. V. S. Ormond	11 January 1915	Acting
Brigadier-General	S. W. Hare	1 February 1915	Wounded 25 March 1915
Colonel	O. C. Wolley-Dod	25 April 1915	Temporary
Lieutenant-Colonel	D. E. Cayley	27 April 1915	Acting
Lieutenant-Colonel	H. G. Casson	30 April 1915	Acting
Brigade split up 4 May 1915, reformed 6 June 1915
Brigadier-General	O. C. Wolley-Dod	6 June 1915	Invalided 13 August 1915
Brigadier-General	D. E. Cayley	13 August 1915	Temporary
Brigadier-General	C. J. Perceval	14 August 1915	
Brigadier-General	W. de L. Williams	20 December 1915	
Brigadier-General	R. G. Jelf	29 April 1917	Invalided 16 August 1917
Lieutenant-Colonel	H. Nelson	16 August 1917	Acting
Brigadier-General	G. R. H. Cheape	24 August 1917	
