= Lancashire Landing Cemetery =

War cemetery in Cape Helles, Turkey

- Commonwealth War Graves Commission
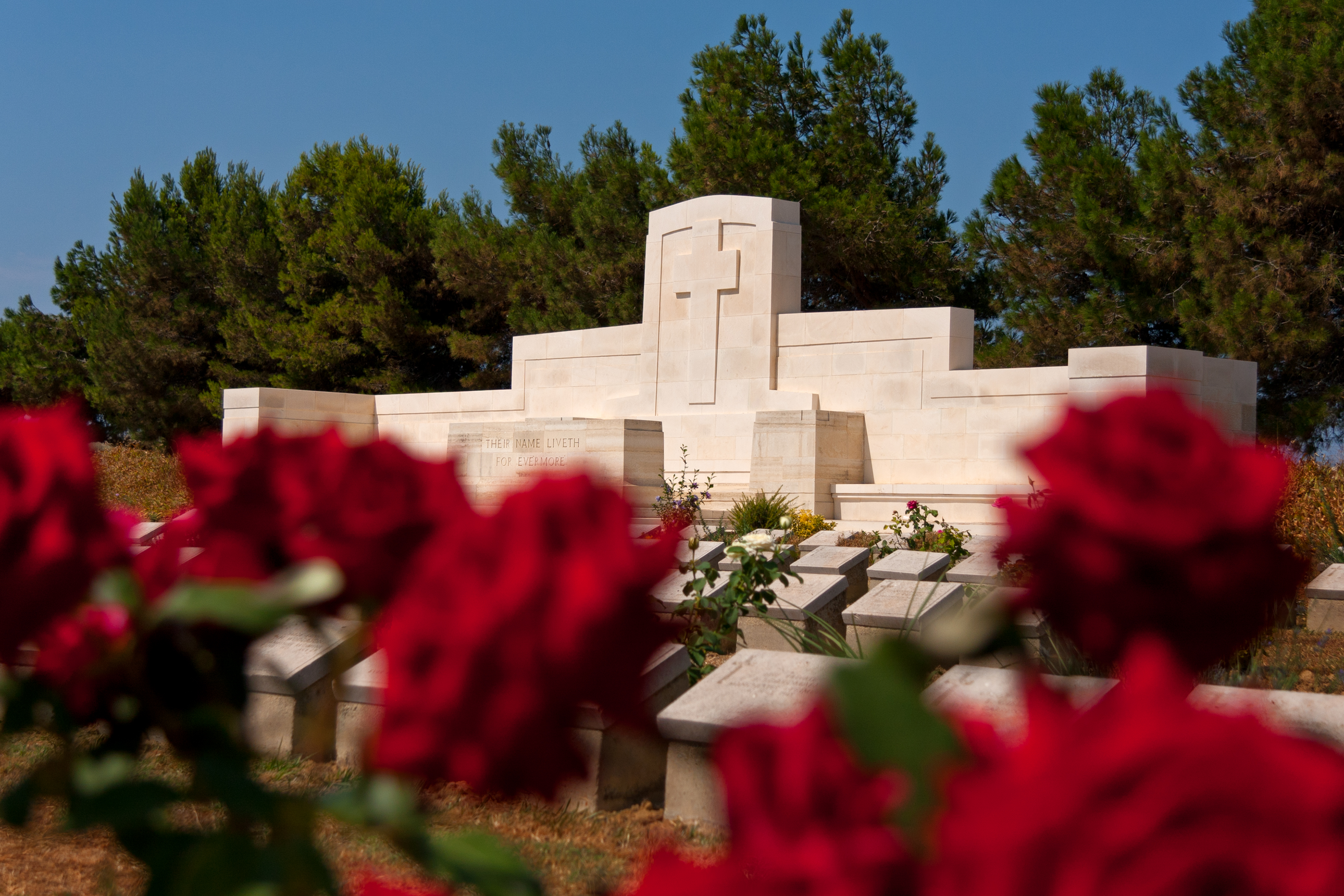
- Used for those deceased 1915–1916
- Established: 1915
- Location: 40°03′14″N 26°10′23″E near Seddülbahir, Cape Helles, Turkey
- Designed by: John James Burnet
- Total burials: 1,388
- Unknowns: 135

Burials by nation
- Allied Powers: British 1,163; Australian 25; New Zealand 13; Newfoundland 2; Zion Mule Corps 2; Greece 17

Burials by war
- World War I: 1,388

Lancashire Landing Cemetery is a Commonwealth War Graves Commission cemetery located on the Gallipoli peninsula in Turkey. It contains the graves of some of the Allied troops killed during the Battle of Gallipoli.

It is located 500 metres inland from W Beach on Karaja Oghul Tepe (which the invading troops called Hill 114) just west of Cape Helles. Most of the cemetery was laid out between the landing in April 1915 and the evacuation in January 1916. Additional graves were moved into it from the Aegean islands after the Armistice.

Buried at the cemetery are Victoria Cross recipient, William Kenealy, two graves from the Zion Mule Corps, and 17 Greek graves. 135 of the burials are unidentified, but memorials commemorate ten of people known to be buried among them.
