= Helles Memorial =

CWGC cemetery in Turkey

- Commonwealth War Graves Commission
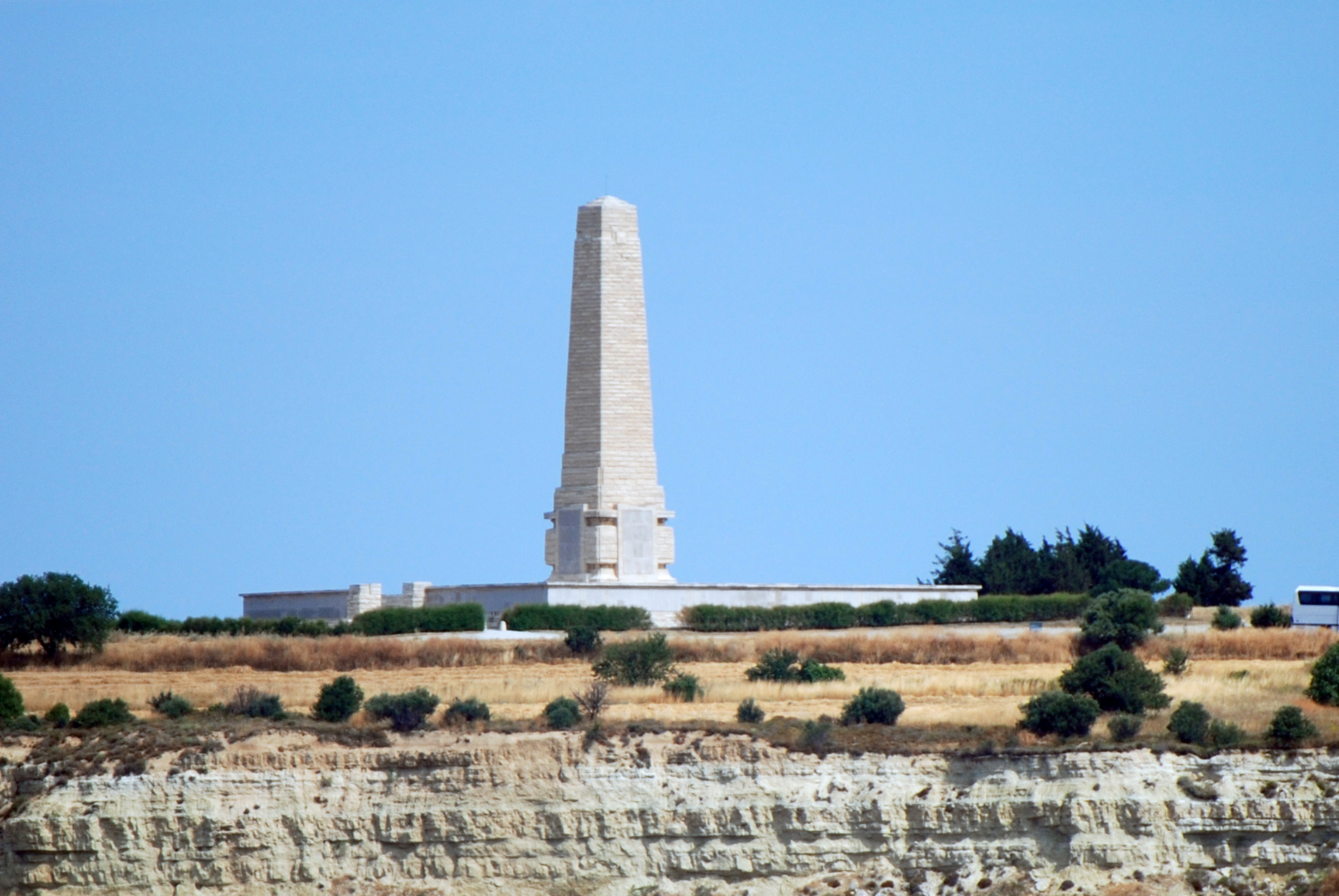
- The Helles Memorial from afar.
- For First World War missing, presumed dead from the Gallipoli campaign who have no known grave.
- Unveiled: 1924
- Location: 40°2′45″N 26°10′45″E near Sedd el Bahr, Turkey
- Designed by: John James Burnet
- Commemorated: 20885

The Helles Memorial is a Commonwealth War Graves Commission war memorial near Sedd el Bahr, in Turkey, on the headland at the tip of the Gallipoli peninsula overlooking the Dardanelles. It includes an obelisk which is over 30 metres (98 ft) high.

The memorial is the main Commonwealth battle memorial for the whole Gallipoli campaign, and also commemorates the 20,956 Commonwealth servicemen with no known grave who died in the campaign in 1915–1916, during the First World War.

The United Kingdom and Indian forces named on the memorial died in operations throughout the peninsula, with main landings at Cape Helles and Suvla Bay, and the Australian and New Zealand Army Corps fought mainly at ANZAC Cove. There are also panels for those who died or were buried at sea in Gallipoli waters.

Other Commonwealth memorials to missing servicemen from the Gallipoli campaign include the Lone Pine Memorial, Hill 60 Memorial, Chunuk Bair Memorial, and Twelve Tree Copse Memorial. Naval casualties who were buried at sea are also commemorated on the Portsmouth Naval Memorial, Plymouth Naval Memorial and Chatham Naval Memorial in the UK.

French casualties are commemorated at the Morto Bay French Cemetery. The main Turkish memorial is the Çanakkale Martyrs' Memorial.

== Notable people commemorated ==
Among those commemorated at the Helles Memorial are five Victoria Cross recipients:

- Major Cuthbert Bromley
- Lieutenant-Colonel Sir John Milbanke, 10th Baronet
- Captain Gerald Robert O'Sullivan
- Sergeant Frank Edward Stubbs
- Sub-Lieutenant Arthur Walderne St Clair Tisdall

Also four rugby union internationals:

- Captain William Campbell Church (Scotland)
- Captain Arthur James Dingle (England)
- Sergeant William Nanson (England)
- Captain Eric Templeton Young (Scotland)

Two first-class cricketers:

- Lieutenant James Sutcliffe
- Acting Lieutenant Colonel Cecil Palmer

Also from football

Private James (Jimmy) Chalmers

And a composer:

- William Denis Browne

== See also ==
- List of war cemeteries and memorials on the Gallipoli Peninsula
