= Alfred Joseph Richards =

English Victoria Cross recipient (1879-1953)

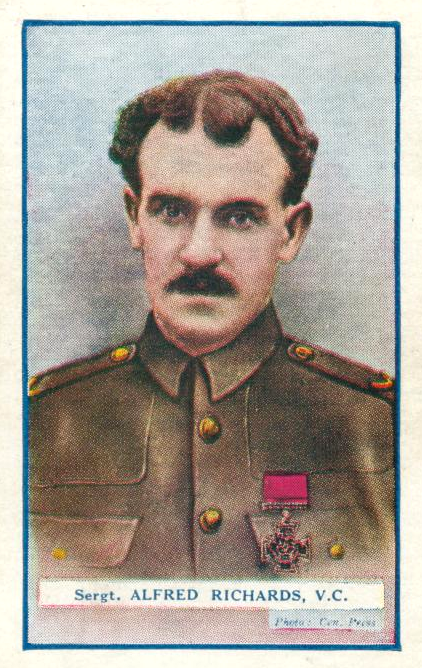
- Richards depicted on a cigarette card
- Born: 21 June 1879; Plymouth, Devon, England
- Died: 21 May 1953 (aged 73); Southfields, London, England
- Burial place: Putney Vale Cemetery
- Military career
- Allegiance: United Kingdom
- Branch: British Army
- Service years: 1895−1915
- Rank: Sergeant
- Service number: 1293
- Units: Lancashire Fusiliers; Home Guard
- Conflicts: World War I World War II
- Awards: Victoria Cross

Sergeant Alfred Joseph Richards VC (21 June 1879 – 21 May 1953) was an English recipient of the Victoria Cross, the highest and most prestigious award for gallantry in the face of the enemy that can be awarded to British and Commonwealth forces.

Richards was born in Plymouth, Devon, the son of a former colour sergeant in the Lancashire Fusiliers. In 1895 Richards himself joined the Lancashire Fusiliers as a bandboy, rising to sergeant by 1914. After war broke out in 1914, he travelled with his battalion to Gallipoli in Turkey.

Richards was 35 years old, and a sergeant in the 1st Battalion, The Lancashire Fusiliers, British Army during the First World War when the following deed took place for which he was awarded the VC.

On 25 April 1915 west of Cape Helles, Gallipoli, three companies and the Headquarters of the 1st Battalion, Lancashire Fusiliers, when landing on W Beach, were met by deadly fire from hidden machine-guns which caused many casualties. The survivors, however, rushed up and cut the wire entanglements, notwithstanding the terrific fire from the enemy and, after overcoming supreme difficulties, the cliffs were gained and the position maintained.

Sergeant Richards was one of six members of the regiment elected for the award, the others being Cuthbert Bromley, John Elisha Grimshaw, William Kenealy, Frank Edward Stubbs, and Richard Raymond Willis. The courage of the six men was described in the Press as "6 VCs before breakfast".

As a result of a wound sustained in the action, Richards had to have his leg amputated and was discharged from the army as unfit for further service. Despite this he served in the Home Guard during World War II as a provost sergeant.

Richards is buried in Putney Vale Cemetery.

== The Medal ==
His medals were purchased by Lord Ashcroft at auction in 2005 and are held by the Imperial War Museum, London.

== Bibliography ==
- VCs of the First World War - Gallipoli (Stephen Snelling, 1995)
- Harvey, David (2000). Monuments to Courage. Naval & Military Press Ltd. ISBN 1-84342-356-1.
- Buzzell, Nora, ed. (1997). The Register of the Victoria Cross. Cheltenham, Gloucestershire: This England Alma House. ISBN 0-906324-27-0.
