= Frank Jefferson =

English Victoria Cross recipient (1921-1982)

Francis Arthur Jefferson VC
- Frank Jefferson with his parents after receiving his medal.
- Born: 18 August 1921; Ulverston, Lancashire, England
- Died: 4 September 1982 (aged 61); Bolton, Greater Manchester, England
- Military career
- Allegiance: United Kingdom
- Branch: British Army
- Service years: 1942−1946; 1950−1951
- Rank: Lance Corporal
- Nickname: "Frank"
- Service number: 3663590
- Units: Lancashire Fusiliers; Northamptonshire Regiment
- Conflicts: Second World War
- Awards: Victoria Cross

Lance Corporal Francis Arthur Jefferson VC (18 August 1921 – 4 September 1982) was a British Army soldier and an English recipient of the Victoria Cross (VC), the highest award for gallantry in the face of the enemy that can be awarded to British and Commonwealth forces. It was awarded for his actions at the Battle of Monte Cassino in mid-1944 during the gruelling Italian campaign of the Second World War.

== Details ==
Jefferson was 22 years old, and a fusilier in the 2nd Battalion, Lancashire Fusiliers, British Army during the Second World War when the following deed took place for which he was awarded the VC.

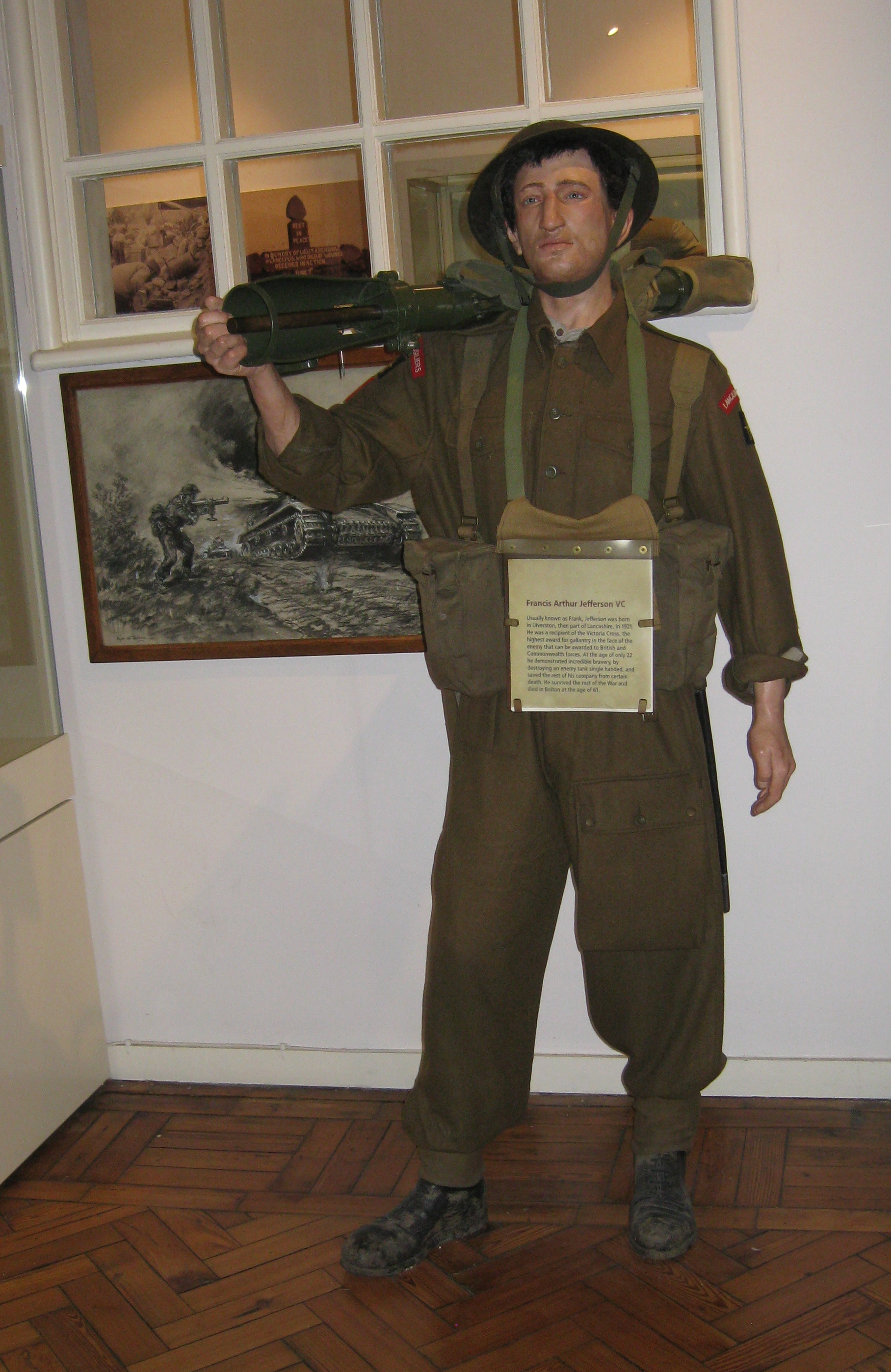
Depiction of Jefferson and the PIAT at the Fusilier Museum

On 16 May 1944, during an attack on the Gustav Line, Monte Cassino, Italy, the leading company of Fusilier Jefferson's battalion had to dig in without protection. The enemy counter-attacked opening fire at short range, and Fusilier Jefferson on his own initiative seized a PIAT and, running forward under a hail of bullets, fired on the leading tank. It burst into flames and its crew were killed. The fusilier then reloaded and went towards the second tank which withdrew before he could get within range. By this time, British tanks had arrived and the enemy counter-attack was smashed.

Francis Jefferson's Victoria Cross was stolen in January 1982 during a burglary at his mother's home at Luton Street, Bolton, Lancashire. The VC has never been recovered.

== Bibliography ==
- Whitworth, Alan (2015). VCs of the North: Cumbria, Durham & Northumberland. Pen and Sword Books. ISBN 978-1473848221.
