= Cuthbert Bromley =

Recipient of the Victoria Cross

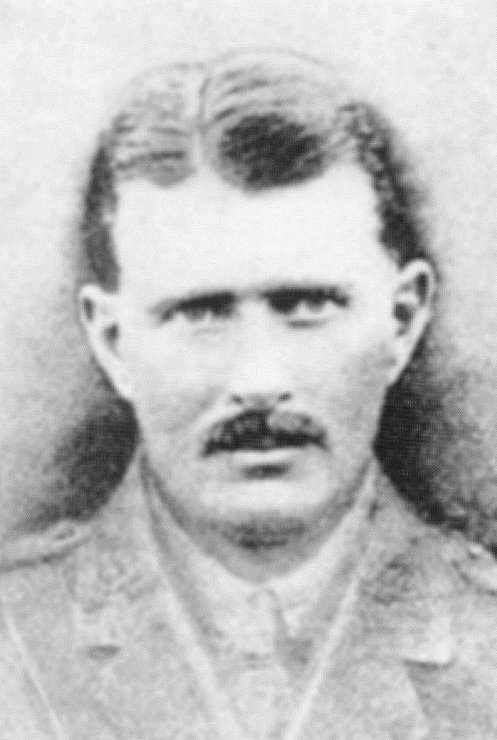
- Cuthbert Bromley VC
- Born: 19 September 1878; Hammersmith, London, England
- Died: 13 August 1915 (aged 36); HMT Royal Edward, Mediterranean Sea
- Burial place: Remembered on the Helles Memorial
- Military career
- Allegiance: United Kingdom
- Branch: British Army
- Service years: 1898 – 1915
- Rank: Major
- Units: King's Regiment (Liverpool); The Lancashire Fusiliers
- Conflicts: World War I: Gallipoli campaign (WIA); Landing at Cape Helles; Landing at W Beach (WIA); Battle of Gully Ravine (WIA); Sinking of HMT Royal Edward †
- Awards: Victoria Cross

Major Cuthbert Bromley VC (19 September 1878 – 13 August 1915) was an English recipient of the Victoria Cross, the highest and most prestigious award for gallantry in the face of the enemy that can be awarded to British and Commonwealth forces.

Bromley was a son of John Bromley. He was commissioned as a second lieutenant into the 3rd (Militia) Battalion, King's Regiment (Liverpool), on 14 February 1896. He transferred to the Lancashire Fusiliers on 4 May 1898.

He was promoted from supernumerary lieutenant captain to captain on 24 June 1908.

Bromley was a captain in the 1st Battalion, Lancashire Fusiliers, British Army, at the time of being awarded the VC for his actions on 25 April 1915, during the landings at W Beach, Gallipoli, Turkey, and during which he was wounded three times.

He was promoted to major in September 1915.

== Citation ==
On the 25th April, 1915, headquarters and three companies of the 1st Battalion, Lancashire Fusiliers in effecting a landing on the Gallipoli Peninsula to the West of Cape Helles, were met by very deadly fire from hidden machine guns, which caused a great number of casualties. The survivors, however, rushed up to and cut the wire entanglements, notwithstanding the terrific fire from the enemy, and after overcoming supreme difficulties, the cliffs were gained and the position maintained. Amongst the many very gallant officers and men engaged in this most hazardous undertaking, Captain Bromley, Serjeant Stubbs, and Corporal Grimshaw have been selected by their comrades as having performed the most signal acts of bravery and devotion to duty.

Bromley was wounded during the W Beach landing, and sustained a bullet injury to the knee on 28 April. He was wounded again during the Battle of Gully Ravine on 28 June, and was evacuated to Egypt to recover. On 13 August 1915, returning to the Gallipoli peninsula aboard the troopship Royal Edward, he was killed when the ship was torpedoed in the Mediterranean between Alexandria and Gallipoli, by the UB-14.

Bromley was promoted to acting Major on 13 June. Due to the illness of his commanding officer, taking command of the regiment in the Battle of Gully Ravine. Major Bromley was one of the six members of the regiment elected for the award, one of the famous "six VC's before breakfast". Bromley is remembered in his home town of Seaford on the War Memorial, and on a brass memorial in St. Leonard's Church. A road in the town is also named after him.

== Medals ==
Bromley's medals were last mentioned at an auction in the 1980s.

== See also ==
- William Kenealy
- Alfred Joseph Richards
- Richard Raymond Willis

== Bibliography ==
- Snelling, Stephen (2012) [1995]. Gallipoli. VCs of the First World War. The History Press. ISBN 978-0752456539.
