= William Marshall (British Army officer, born 1865) =

British Army general (1865–1939)

Lieutenant-General Sir William Marshall GCMG KCB KCSI
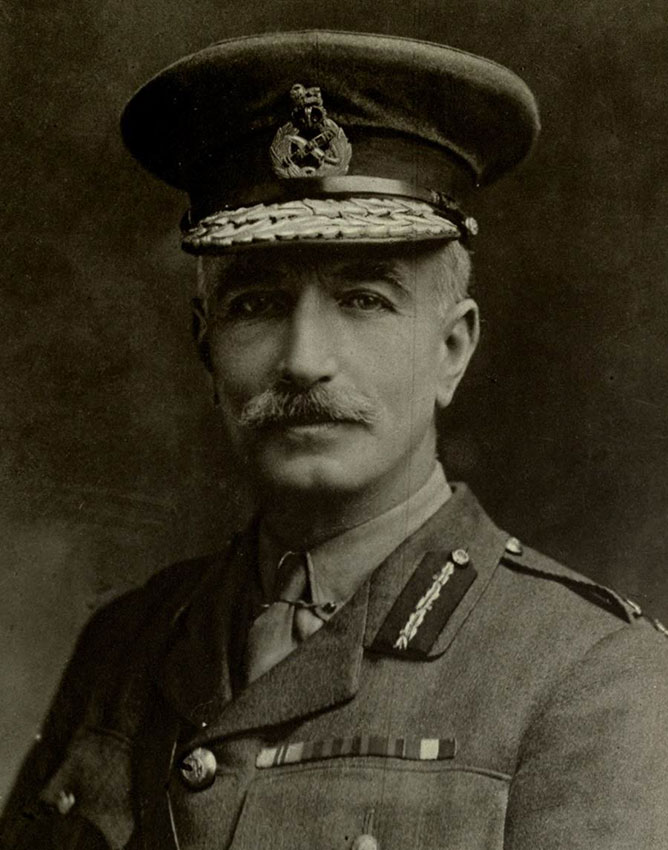
- Born: 29 October 1865; Stranton, near Hartlepool, County Durham, England
- Died: 29 May 1939 (aged 73); Bagnoles-de-l'Orne, France
- Military career
- Allegiance: United Kingdom
- Branch: British Army
- Service years: 1886--1925
- Rank: Lieutenant-General
- Unit: Sherwood Foresters
- Commands: 1st Battalion, Sherwood Foresters; 87th Brigade; 42nd (East Lancashire) Division; 29th Division; 53rd (Welsh) Division; 27th Division; Southern Army, India
- Conflicts: Second Boer War; First World War
- Awards: Knight Grand Cross of the Order of St Michael and St George; Knight Commander of the Order of the Bath; Knight Commander of the Order of the Star of India; Order of the White Eagle, 2nd Class (Serbia)

Lieutenant-General Sir William Raine Marshall GCMG KCB KCSI (29 October 1865 – 29 May 1939) was a British Army officer who in November 1917 succeeded Sir Stanley Maude (upon the latter's death from cholera) as commander-in-chief of the British forces in Mesopotamia. He kept that position until the end of the First World War.

== Early military career ==
William Raines Marshall was born on 29 October 1865 in the village of Stranton, near Hartlepool, County Durham, England. He was "the younger son of William Marshall, solicitor, of Foggy Furs, Stranton, and his wife, Elizabeth Raine".

He was first educated at Repton School and then the Royal Military College at Sandhurst. He received a commission as a subaltern, with the rank of lieutenant, into the Sherwood Foresters, a line infantry regiment of the British Army, on 30 January 1886. He spent the first few years of his long military career with the 1st Battalion of his regiment, largely in Ireland. It was while here that "he made a reputation as a horseman".

He carried this reputation after being transferred to the 2nd Battalion, then serving in British India. He returned to Britain in May 1892, and was promoted to captain in January 1893. He returned to India in May 1894, after which he served on the Malakand expedition in the late 1890s, where he was attached to the 1st Battalion, Queen's Own Royal West Kent Regiment, on the North West Frontier of India, "where he was at the action of Landaika" on 16 August. He also served in the Tirah expedition. He "was present at the storming of the Daghai Heights and the capture of the Samphaga and Arhanga Passes, earning the Indian Frontier Medal of 1895 with two clasps". He returned to Britain in October 1898 and was posted to Malta, where he helped in the creation of a school for mounted infantry.

In May 1900, several months after the beginning of the Second Boer War, he was sent to South Africa where he assumed command of a company of mounted infantry. He did this until January 1901 when he was promoted to the local rank of major in order to take command of a battalion of mounted infantry. In July of that year he was promoted once again, this time to the brevet rank of major, and, in December, he took over the command of a mounted column, consisting of several thousand men. He remained in this position until hostilities were brought to an end due to the Treaty of Vereeniging in May 1902. He was slightly wounded during the war but was twice mentioned in dispatches, and received the Queen's Medal with three clasps as well as the King's Medal with two clasps. He also received a brevet promotion to lieutenant colonel in the South African Honours list, published on 26 June.

Having returned to Britain with his battalion in October "and for the next eight years served as a company commander". He returned to his regiment in January 1903, was promoted to the substantial rank of major in December 1904, and to brevet colonel in June 1908.

In January 1911, he was appointed as an assistant commandant of the School of Instruction for Mounted Infantry at Longmoor, Hampshire. He was only there until September when he returned to regimental duty, and then served for two years as second-in-command of the 1st Battalion, Sherwood Foresters before being promoted to the substantive rank of lieutenant colonel in February 1912, when he became the battalion's new commanding officer (CO) in succession to Colonel Owen Wolley-Dod. At the end of the year, Marshall and his battalion were sent to India, "and had then become coast and internal defence troops" in Bombay.

== First World War ==
Still in this post upon the outbreak of the First World War in the summer of 1914, Marshall served on the Western Front during 1914–15.

He was then promoted to the temporary wartime rank of brigadier general in February 1915 and assigned to command the 87th Infantry Brigade-"I am more proud of having commanded this Brigade than of any higher command to which I succeeded during the war", he later described,-of the 29th Division, which he led in the ill-fated expedition to Gallipoli, during which he received a promotion to major-general in June 1915 "for distinguished service in the Field", although he later wrote that, "it did not give me the satisfaction it ought to have done". On 25 April that year he was wounded during the "X" Beach landings, having received a slight flesh wound in the leg above the knee.

A series of divisional commands then followed: 42nd, 29th, and 53rd, before he was posted to Salonika with the 27th Division, and then, promoted to temporary lieutenant general in September 1916, with III (Indian) Corps on the Mesopotamian Front. It was while commanding III Corps that Marshall participated in the capture of Kut-al-Amara in February 1917, and in the capture of Baghdad the following month.

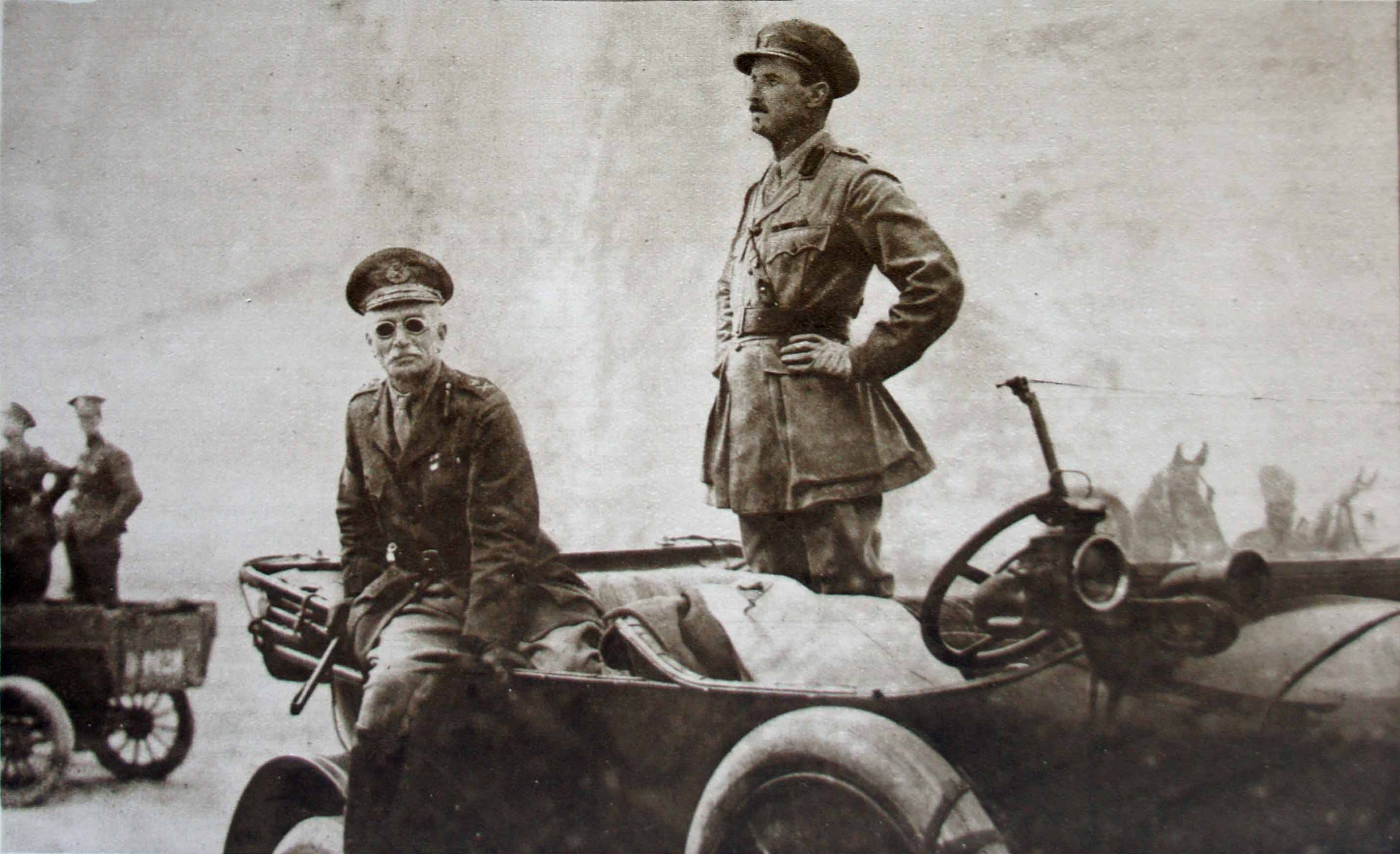
Lieutenant-General Marshall (left) in Baghdad, 1917/1918.

With Lieutenant General Sir Frederick Maude's death as commander-in-chief from cholera (most probably from contaminated milk), the popular commander was replaced by the careful and meticulous Marshall, appointed by General Sir William Robertson, the chief of the imperial general staff (CIGS) at the War Office in London, the latter determined to scale back operations in Mesopotamia. It was in this capacity that Marshall accepted the surrender of the Ottoman army at Mosul on 30 October 1918, with the signing of the armistice of Mudros.

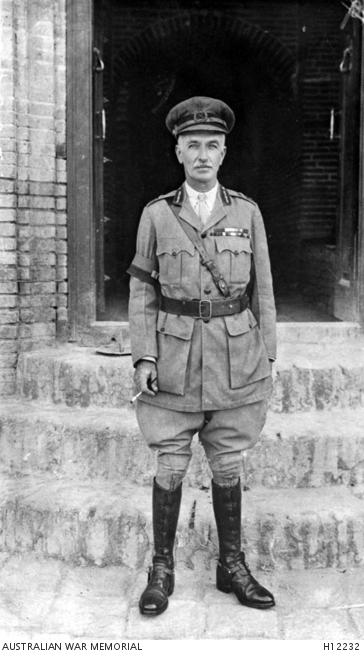
Marshall in Mesopotamia, 1918.

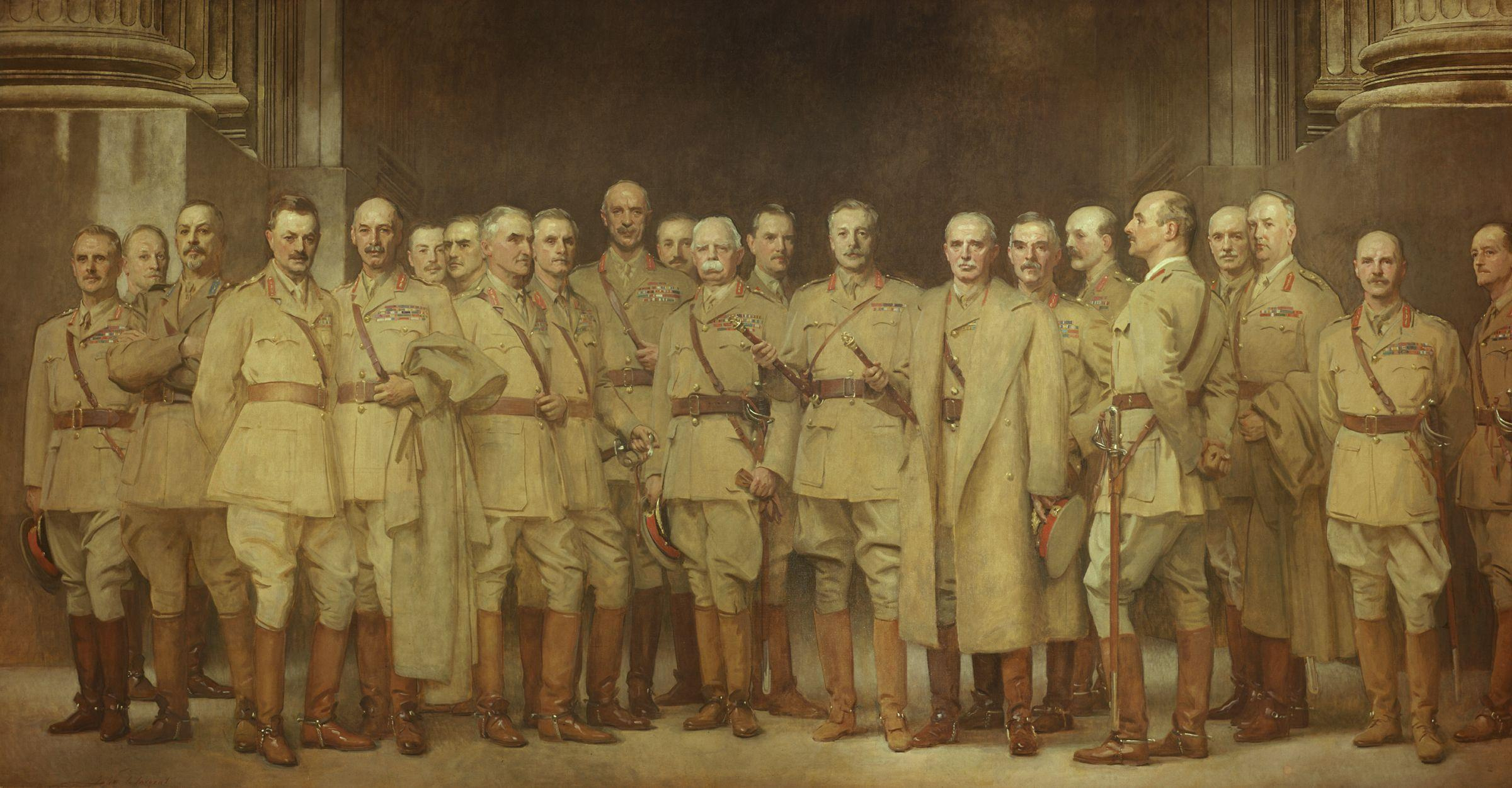
Some General Officers of the Great War. Lieutenant General Sir William Marshall is fourth from the right.

His decision to seize Ottoman territory around Mosul after the ceasefire is controversial, the Official History makes no mention of this action and is explained in a 2017 article.

== Post-war and final years ==
His post-war career saw him promoted to substantive lieutenant general in January 1919 and took him back to India, commanding the Southern Army from November 1920 and remaining there until November 1923; he retired the following year.

Marshall was appointed a Companion of the Order of the Bath in 1916. He was knighted three times – as a Knight Commander of the Order of the Bath (1917), Knight Commander of the Order of the Star of India (1918) and Knight Grand Cross of the Order of St Michael and St George (1919).

He served as colonel of the Sherwood Foresters from August 1930, upon the death of General Sir Horace Smith-Dorrien, until 1935.

He died of heart failure at Le Grand Hôtel, Bagnoles-de-l'Orne, France, at the age of 73, on 29 May 1939. He was survived by his wife, Emma Cundell, whom he married in 1902.

== Bibliography ==
- Davies, Frank (1997). Bloody Red Tabs: General Officer Casualties of the Great War 1914–1918. London: Pen & Sword Books. ISBN 978-0-85052-463-5.
- Marshall, Lieutenant General Sir William R. (1929). Memories of Four Fronts. Ernest Benn Limited. OCLC 878194561.
- Riley, Alec (2021). Gallipoli Diary 1915. Little Gully Publishing. ISBN 978-0645235913.

Military offices
Preceded by John Lindley	GOC 53rd (Welsh) Infantry Division; August–December 1915	Succeeded by Alister Dallas
Preceded by Sir Charles Anderson	GOC-in-C, Southern Army, India; 1919–1923	Succeeded by Sir Andrew Skeen
