= Baron Street drill hall =

Former military installation in Rochdale, England

- Rochdale
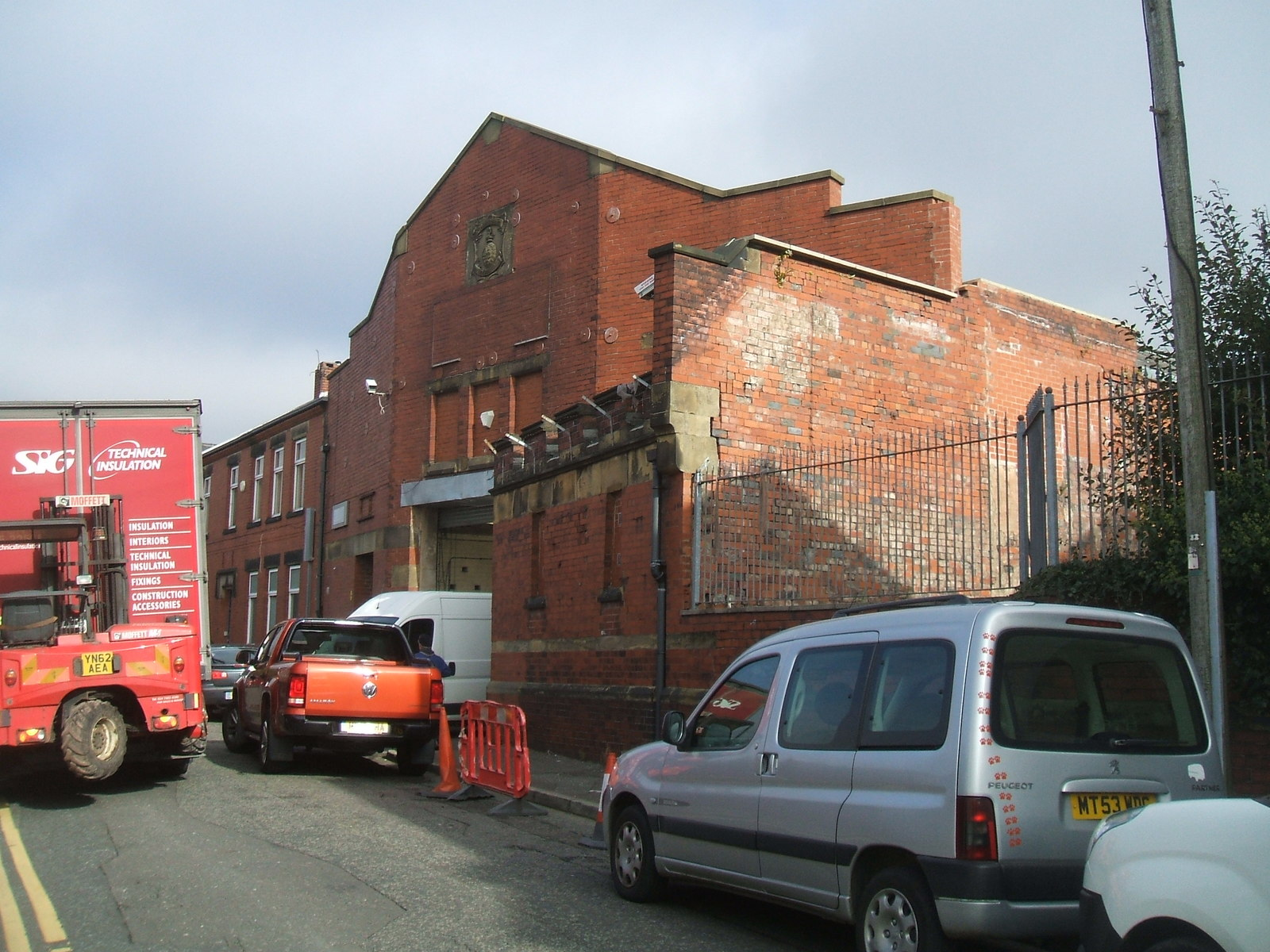
- Baron Street drill hall

Site information
- Type: Drill hall

Location
- Location within Greater Manchester
- Coordinates: 53.61458°N 2.15241°W

Site history
- Built: c. 1865
- Built for: War Office
- In use: c. 1865–1980s

The Baron Street drill hall is a former military installation in Rochdale, Greater Manchester, England.

== History ==
The building was designed as the headquarters of the 12th Lancashire Rifle Volunteers in around 1865. This unit evolved to become the 2nd Volunteer Battalion the Lancashire Fusiliers in 1883 and the 6th Battalion, the Lancashire Fusiliers in 1908. The battalion was mobilised at the drill hall in August 1914 before being deployed to Gallipoli and ultimately to the Western Front. The drill hall continued to be used by the battalion until the Second World War and, although the 6th Battalion was disbanded after the war, elements of the 5th (Volunteer) Battalion continued to use it until the 1980s when it was decommissioned and sold for industrial use.
