= 87th Brigade (United Kingdom) =

Military unit

The 87th Brigade was an infantry brigade formation of the British Army that saw service in World War I. It was originally formed in 1915 from four Regular Army battalions serving away from home in numerous parts of the British Empire. Its first commander was General W.R. Marshall, with C.H.T.Lucas taking command in August 1915. The brigade was assigned to the 29th Division and served in the Gallipoli Campaign from 1915 - 1916, preceding a short time in the Middle Eastern theatre, later being sent to the Western Front in time to attack at Beaumont Hamel on July 1, 1916, and remaining on that front for the rest of the war.

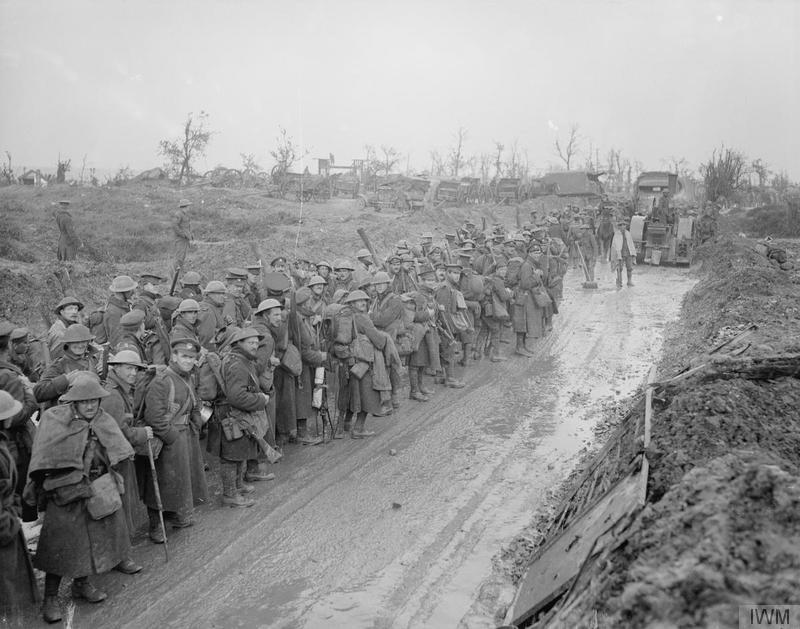
Men of the 2nd Battalion, South Wales Borderers on the road to the trenches in the rain at Montauban, France, October 1916.

== Formation ==
- 2nd Battalion, South Wales Borderers
- 1st Battalion, King's Own Scottish Borderers
- 1st Battalion, Royal Inniskilling Fusiliers
- 1st Battalion, Border Regiment
- 87th Machine Gun Company
- 87th Trench Mortar Battery

== Commanders ==
The following officers commanded 87th Brigade during the First World War:

- Brigadier-General W. R. Marshall (24 January 1915)

- Acting: Lieutenant-Colonel R. O. C. Hume (27 April 1915)
- Acting: Lieutenant-Colonel H. G. Casson (28 April 1915)

- Brigadier-General W. R. Marshall (29 April 1915)

- Acting: Lieutenant-Colonel Q. G. K. Agnew (24 July 1915)

- Brigadier-General W. R. Marshall (8 August 1915)

- Acting: Lieutenant-Colonel C. H. T. Lucas (15 August 1915)

- Brigadier-General C. H. T. Lucas (24 August 1915)
- Brigadier-General R. N. Bray (7 December 1916)

- Acting: Lieutenant-Colonel A. J. Welch (14 February 1917)

- Brigadier-General C. H. T. Lucas (3 April 1917)

- Acting: Lieutenant-Colonel A. J. Ellis (20 October 1917)

- Brigadier-General C. H. T. Lucas (12 November 1917)

- Acting: Lieutenant-Colonel G. T. Raikes (16 January 1918)

- Brigadier-General G. H. N. Jackson (20 January 1918)
