= Frank Edward Stubbs =

English Victoria Cross recipient (1888–1915)

Frank Edward Stubbs VC
- Born: 12 March 1888; Walworth, Surrey, England
- Died: 25 April 1915 (aged 27); W Beach, Cape Helles, Gallipoli Peninsula, Ottoman Turkey
- Military career
- Allegiance: United Kingdom
- Branch: British Army
- Rank: Sergeant
- Units: Lancashire Fusiliers
- Conflicts: World War I: Gallipoli campaign; Landing at Cape Helles; Landing at W Beach †
- Awards: Victoria Cross

Frank Edward Stubbs VC (12 March 1888 – 25 April 1915) was an English recipient of the Victoria Cross, the highest and most prestigious award for gallantry in the face of the enemy that can be awarded to British and Commonwealth forces.

Stubbs was 27 years old, and a sergeant in the 1st Battalion, Lancashire Fusiliers, British Army during the First World War. He was killed in action on 25 April 1915 while landing on W Beach in Cape Helles, Gallipoli, Turkey.

Stubbs was one of the six members of the regiment elected for the award by the survivors. These were hailed in the press as 'six VC's before breakfast', and the commander of the Allied troops at Gallipoli, General Ian Hamilton ordered that the beach be renamed 'Lancashire Landing'.

The other five of the '6 VCs before breakfast' were awarded to Cuthbert Bromley, John Elisha Grimshaw, William Kenealy, Alfred Joseph Richards and Richard Raymond Willis.

== Citation ==
On the 25th April, 1915, headquarters and three companies of the 1st Battalion, Lancashire Fusiliers, in effecting a landing on the Gallipoli Peninsula to the West of Cape Helles, were met by very deadly fire from hidden machine guns, which caused a great number of casualties. The survivors, however, rushed up to and cut the wire entanglements, notwithstanding the terrific fire from the enemy, and after overcoming supreme difficulties, the cliffs were gained and the position maintained. Amongst the many very gallant officers and men engaged in this most hazardous undertaking, Captain Bromley, Serjeant Stubbs, and Corporal Grimshaw have been selected by their comrades as having performed the most signal acts of bravery and devotion to duty.

— The London Gazette, No. 29985, 15 March 1917

He is commemorated on the Helles Memorial. His Victoria Cross was purchased at auction on 18 April 2024 by an unnamed buyer and is displayed at the Fusilier Museum in Bury, Lancashire.

== Bibliography ==
- Snelling, Stephen (2012) [1995]. Gallipoli. VCs of the First World War. The History Press. ISBN 978-0752456539.
