= Owen Wolley-Dod =

British Army officer (1863–1942)

Owen Cadogan Wolley-Dod
- Born: 2 May 1863
- Died: February 1942 (aged 78)
- Military career
- Allegiance: United Kingdom
- Branch: British Army
- Service years: 1892–1920
- Rank: Brigadier-General
- Conflicts: Sudan Campaign; Occupation of Crete; Second Boer War; World War I

Brigadier-General Owen Cadogan Wolley-Dod CB DSO (2 May 1863 – February 1942) was a British Army officer who served in the Sudan Campaign, the Second Boer War, and World War I.

== Early life and military career ==
Owen Cadogan Wolley-Dod was born on 2 May 1863, the sixth son of Reverend Charles Wolley-Dod of Edge Hall, Malpas, Cheshire. He was educated at Eton and the Royal Military College, Sandhurst, passing out from the latter in August 1883. He joined the Lancashire Fusiliers as a lieutenant and went on to attend the Staff College, Camberley, from 1898 to 1899.

== Military service ==
In March 1892 he was made an adjutant and in December he was promoted to captain.

Wolley-Dod served in the Sudan Campaign (1898) and the occupation of Crete (1898). He fought in the Second Boer War (1899-1902) with the 2nd Lancashire Fusiliers and was wounded at Venter's Spruit (1900). He was later awarded the Distinguished Service Order (DSO)for his actions and in September 1901 was promoted to major. In May 1902 he became a brigade major.

He was made a lieutenant colonel in February 1908 when he took command of the 2nd Battalion of the Sherwood Foresters.

He was promoted to colone l in February 1912 although the promotion was backdated to October 1911. He was placed on half-pay after serving as CO of a battalion the same month. In May, however, he was appointed second-in-command, or assistant commandant, of the RMC, Sandhurst. In February 1914 he succeeded Lieutenant Colonel Stanley Maude as general staff officer, grade 1 of the 5th Division, then stationed in Ireland.

A few months after the British entry into World War I, in August 1914, he became GSO1 of the 29th Division in January 1915 which later saw action in the Gallipoli campaign. In June he was given command of the 29th Division's 86th Infantry Brigade at Gallipoli and was promoted to the temporary rank of brigadier general whilst holding this position. He was wounded and made a Companion of the Order of the Bath (1915) and appointed inspector of Territorial Forces in December 1915, for which he was allowed to retain his temporary brigadier's rank.

He retired from the army on 1 January 1920, although this was later amended to 30 December 1919, and was granted the honorary rank of brigadier general.

== Later life ==
Wolley-Dod retired from the army and died in February 1942, aged 78.
