= Lancashire Fusiliers =

Line infantry regiment of the British Army 1688–1968

Peyton's Regiment of Foot 20th Regiment of Foot 20th (East Devonshire) Regiment of Foot Lancashire Fusiliers
- Cap badge of the Lancashire Fusiliers.
- Active: 1688–1968
- Country: Kingdom of England (1688–1707); Kingdom of Great Britain (1707–1800); United Kingdom (1801–1968)
- Branch: British Army
- Type: Line infantry
- Role: Fusilier
- Size: 1–2 Regular battalions 2 Militia and Special Reserve battalions 1–4 Territorial and Volunteer battalions Up to 24 Hostilities-only battalions
- Garrison/HQ: Wellington Barracks, Bury
- Nicknames: The Two Tens; The Minden Boys; Kingsley's Stand; The Young Fusiliers
- Motto: Omnia audax
- Anniversaries: Gallipoli (25 April); Minden (1 August); Inkerman (5 November)

Insignia
- Hackle: Primrose

The Lancashire Fusiliers was a line infantry regiment of the British Army that saw distinguished service through many years and wars, including the Second Boer War, and the First and Second World Wars. It had many different titles throughout its 280 years of existence.

In 1968 the regiment was amalgamated with the other regiments of the Fusilier Brigade – the Royal Northumberland Fusiliers, Royal Warwickshire Fusiliers and the Royal Fusiliers (City of London Regiment) – to form the current Royal Regiment of Fusiliers.

== History ==
=== 17th–19th century ===
==== Peyton's Regiment of Foot (1688–1740) ====
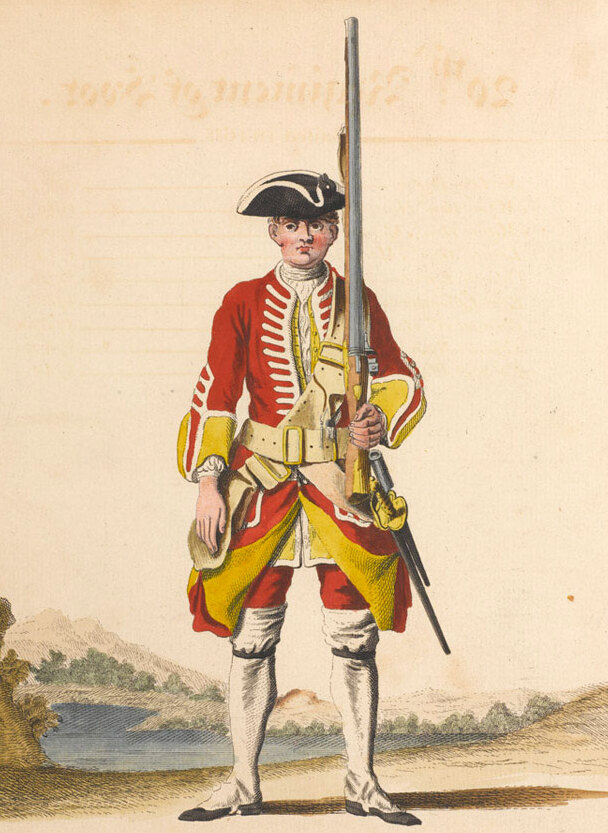
c. 1742 engraving of a regimental private

By a commission dated 20 November 1688, the regiment was formed in Torbay, Devon under Sir Richard Peyton as Peyton's Regiment of Foot. (Until 1751 the regiment's name changed according to the name of the colonel commanding.) The regiment served in the Glorious Revolution under King William III, and at the Battle of the Boyne in July 1690 and the Battle of Aughrim in 1691. During the War of the Spanish Succession (1701–1714), it aided in the capture of Spanish galleons at Battle of Vigo Bay in 1702.

==== Bligh's Regiment of Foot (1740–1746) ====
Under the command of Thomas Bligh, the regiment distinguished itself at the Battle of Dettingen in June 1743 and at the Battle of Fontenoy in May 1745. Under the command of Edward Cornwallis, the regiment also served at the Battle of Culloden in April 1746 during the Jacobite rising of 1745. In December 1748, Cornwallis established a Freemason's Lodge for the regiment, on the registry of the Grand Lodge of Ireland.

==== 20th Regiment of Foot (1751–1782) ====
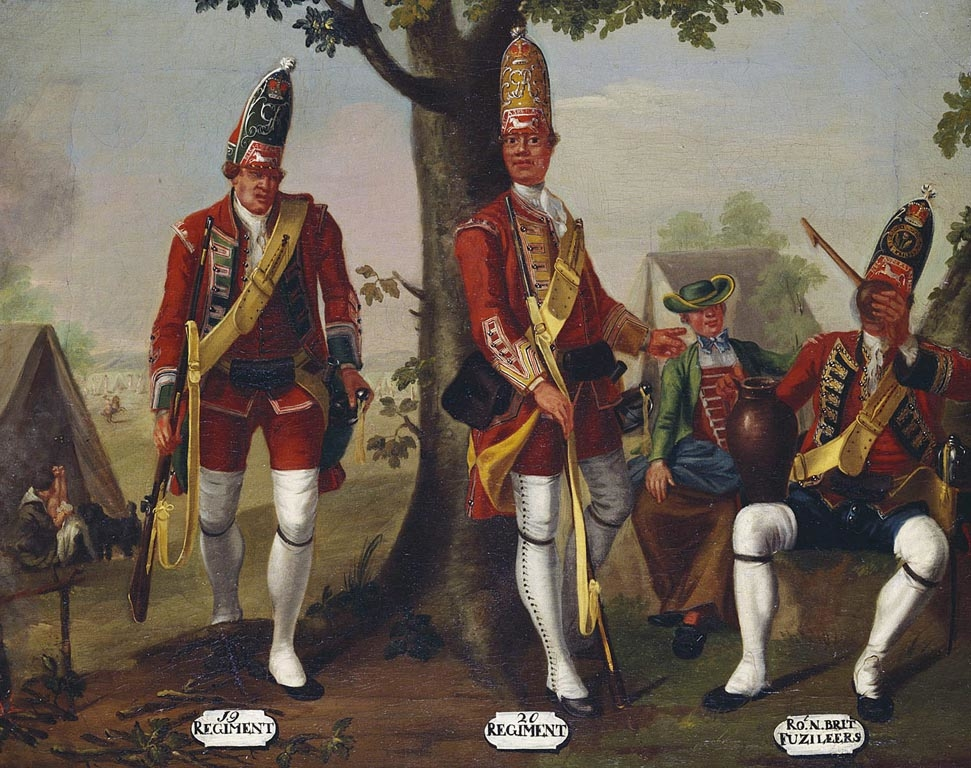
c. 1751 painting of a regimental grenadier (centre)

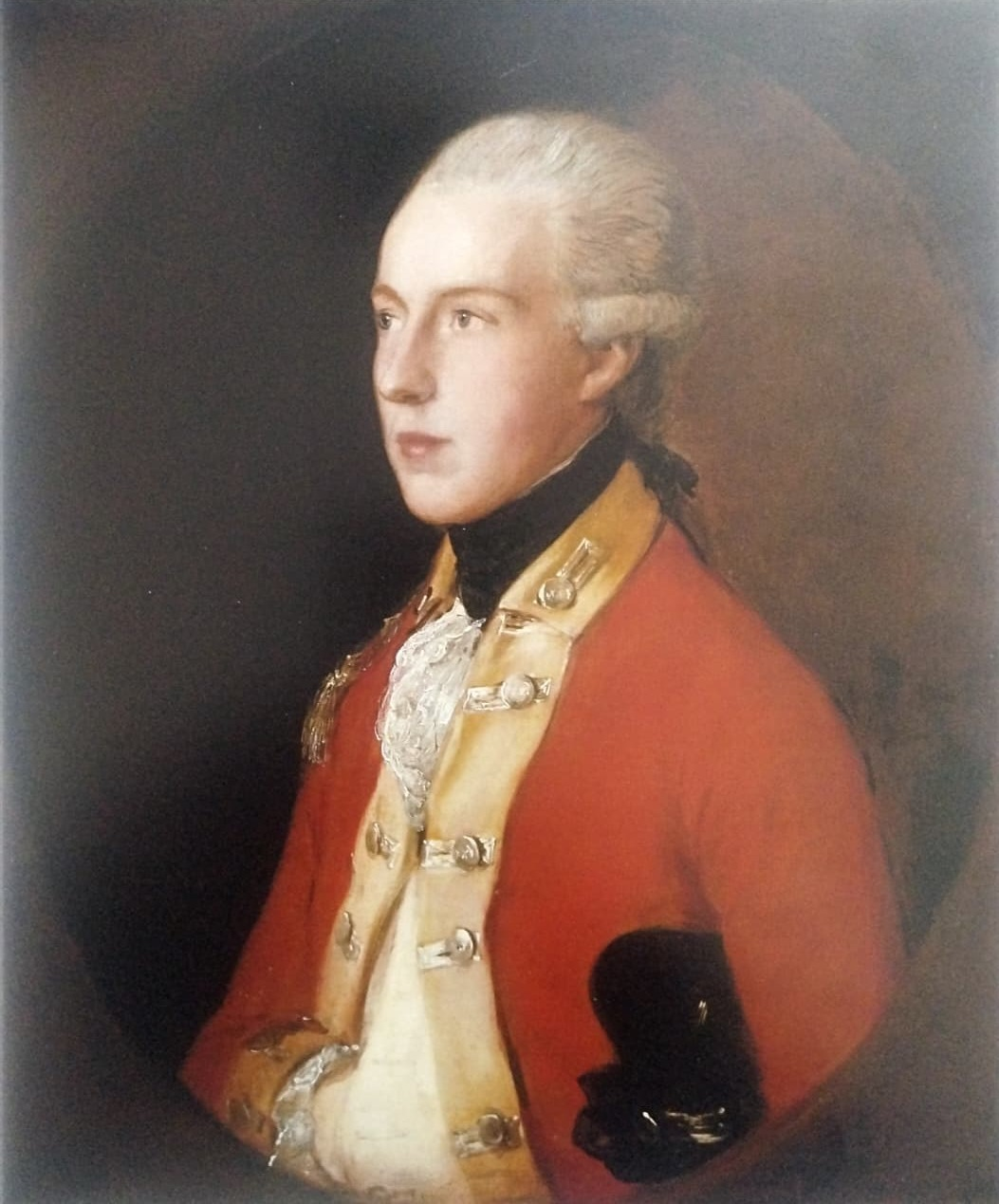
c. 1776 portrait of a regimental captain

In 1751, the regiment became the 20th Regiment of Foot, often written in Roman numerals 'XX Foot', (hence the nickname The Two Tens). During the Seven Years' War the regiment earned honour at the Battle of Minden on 1 August 1759, when, as an infantry formation, they stood fast and broke a French cavalry charge. During the American Revolutionary War, the regiment was sent to Quebec in April 1776 and assisted in the relief of Quebec in May 1776. Serving under General John Burgoyne for the remainder of the Canadian campaign, they later surrendered along with General Burgoyne at Saratoga.

==== 20th (East Devonshire) Regiment of Foot (1782–1881) ====
The 20th Regiment of Foot was designated the 20th (East Devonshire) Regiment of Foot in 1782. The regiment embarked for Holland in August 1799 to take part in the Anglo-Russian invasion of Holland. It fought at the Battle of Krabbendam in September 1799 and the Battle of Alkmaar in October 1799. It departed for Egypt in spring 1801 and saw action at the Battle of Alexandria in March 1801, during the French Revolutionary Wars. After moving to Calabria, it took part in the Battle of Maida in July 1806 during the War of the Third Coalition.

The regiment embarked for Portugal in 1808 for service in the Peninsular War. It saw action at the Battle of Vimeiro in August 1808 and the Battle of Corunna in January 1809 before being evacuated home later that month. The regiment returned to the Peninsula and fought at the Battle of Vitoria in June 1813, where it formed part of the "backbone" of the Duke of Wellington's forces. It then pursued the French Army into France and took part in the Battle of the Pyrenees in July 1813, the Battle of Nivelle in November 1813, and the Battle of Orthez in February 1814, as well the Battle of Toulouse in April 1814.

During the Crimean War, the regiment took part in the Battle of Alma in September 1854 and the Battle of Inkerman in November 1854. The 2nd Battalion was raised in 1858.

==== Lancashire Fusiliers (1881–1908) ====
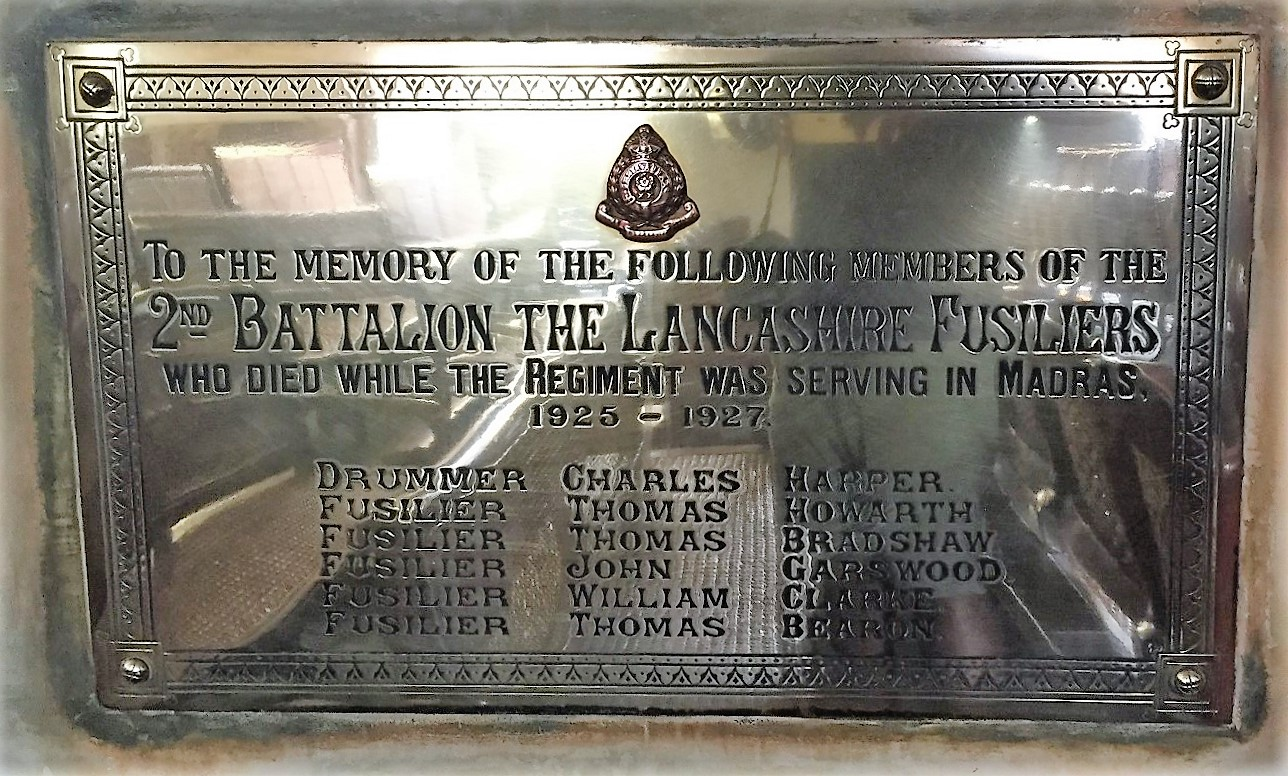
Lancashire Fusiliers Memorial, St. Mary's Church, Madras

The regiment was not superficially affected by the Cardwell Reforms of the 1870s – as it already possessed two battalions, there was no need for it to amalgamate with another regiment. However, in setting its depot at Wellington Barracks in Bury from 1873, it lost its West Country affiliations. This was exacerbated by the Childers reforms of 1881. Under the reforms the regiment became The Lancashire Fusiliers on 1 July 1881.

Under the new arrangements, each county regiment had two Militia battalions attached to it: these were found by the 7th Royal Lancashire Militia (Rifles), raised in 1855 and recruited from Bury, Manchester and Salford. This formed the 3rd and 4th Battalions of the Lancashire Fusiliers. In addition, Rifle Volunteer Corps were attached to their local regiments. In 1883 the 8th Lancashire Rifle Volunteers (raised at Bury on 22 August 1859) became the 1st Volunteer Battalion, Lancashire Fusiliers, and the 12th Lancashire Rifle Volunteers (originally the 24th, raised at Rochdale in February 1860) became the 2nd Volunteer Battalion. In 1886 the 56th Lancashire Rifle Volunteers (raised at Salford on 5 March 1860) was transferred from the Manchester Regiment to become the 3rd Volunteer Battalion.

In common with other regiments recruited from populous urban areas, the Lancashire Fusiliers raised two further regular battalions, the 3rd in 1898, and the 4th in March 1900. This necessitated adjustments to the numbers of the Militia battalions, which became the 5th and 6th battalions. However, the 3rd and 4th Regular battalions were disbanded in 1906.

The 1st Battalion was stationed in Ireland from 1881 to September 1885, and again from April 1891 to 1897. In 1899 it was posted to Crete, and from 1901 at Malta.

The 2nd Battalion was stationed in British India from 1881 to 1898. It was sent to Africa to take part in Kitchener's campaign to reconquer the Sudan and fought at the Battle of Omdurman.

After a year at Malta, the battalion was posted to South Africa in December 1899, following the outbreak of the Second Boer War two months earlier.

During the Second Boer War, the 2nd Battalion saw action at the Battle of Spion Kop in January 1900 and took part in the Relief of Ladysmith in February 1900. The battalion served in South Africa throughout the war, which ended with the Peace of Vereeniging in June 1902.

About 570 officers and men left Cape Town on the SS Britannic in October that year. They were stationed at Aldershot after their return to the United Kingdom. The 5th and 6th (Militia) Battalions also served in South Africa, the 6th leaving with 650 men on 10 February 1900, and later being involved in a sharp action at Luckhoff. The 5th battalion served in the last year of the war. The battalions were awarded the battle honours South Africa 1900–01 (for the 6th) and South Africa 1901–02 (for the 5th). All three Volunteer Battalions also found 'service companies' of volunteers who served alongside the Regulars, and gained the battle honour South Africa 1900–1902 for their battalions.

==== Haldane Reforms ====
Under the Haldane Reforms of 1908, the Militia were redesignated Special Reserve, with the dual wartime role of Home Defence and providing drafts for the Regular Battalions. The Lancashire Fusiliers' militia became 3rd (Reserve) Battalion and 4th (Extra Reserve) Battalion, both based at Bury. The volunteers now became the Territorial Force (TF), with battalions numbered in sequence after the militia. Thus the 1st Volunteer Battalion at Castle Armoury in Bury became 5th Battalion, 2nd Volunteer Battalion at Baron Street in Rochdale became the 6th Battalion, and the 3rd Volunteer Battalion formed the 7th and 8th battalions both based at Cross Lane in Salford. These four battalions formed the Lancashire Fusiliers Brigade, in the East Lancashire Division of the TF, on the eve of the First World War.

=== First World War ===
==== Regular Army ====
The 1st Battalion, which was based in Karachi in the early months of the war, returned to the United Kingdom in January 1915. It was prominent at the landing at Cape Helles on 25 April 1915 during the Gallipoli Campaign as part of the 86th Brigade in the 29th Division. The shore had been silent but as the first boat landed, Ottoman small-arms fire swept the British and caused many casualties. Six Victoria Crosses were awarded to the 1st Battalion, Lancashire Fusiliers – 'the six VCs before breakfast'. The landing spot (W Beach) was later known as 'Lancashire Landing'. The battalion were evacuated in January 1916 and landed at Marseille in March 1916. It saw action on the Western Front.

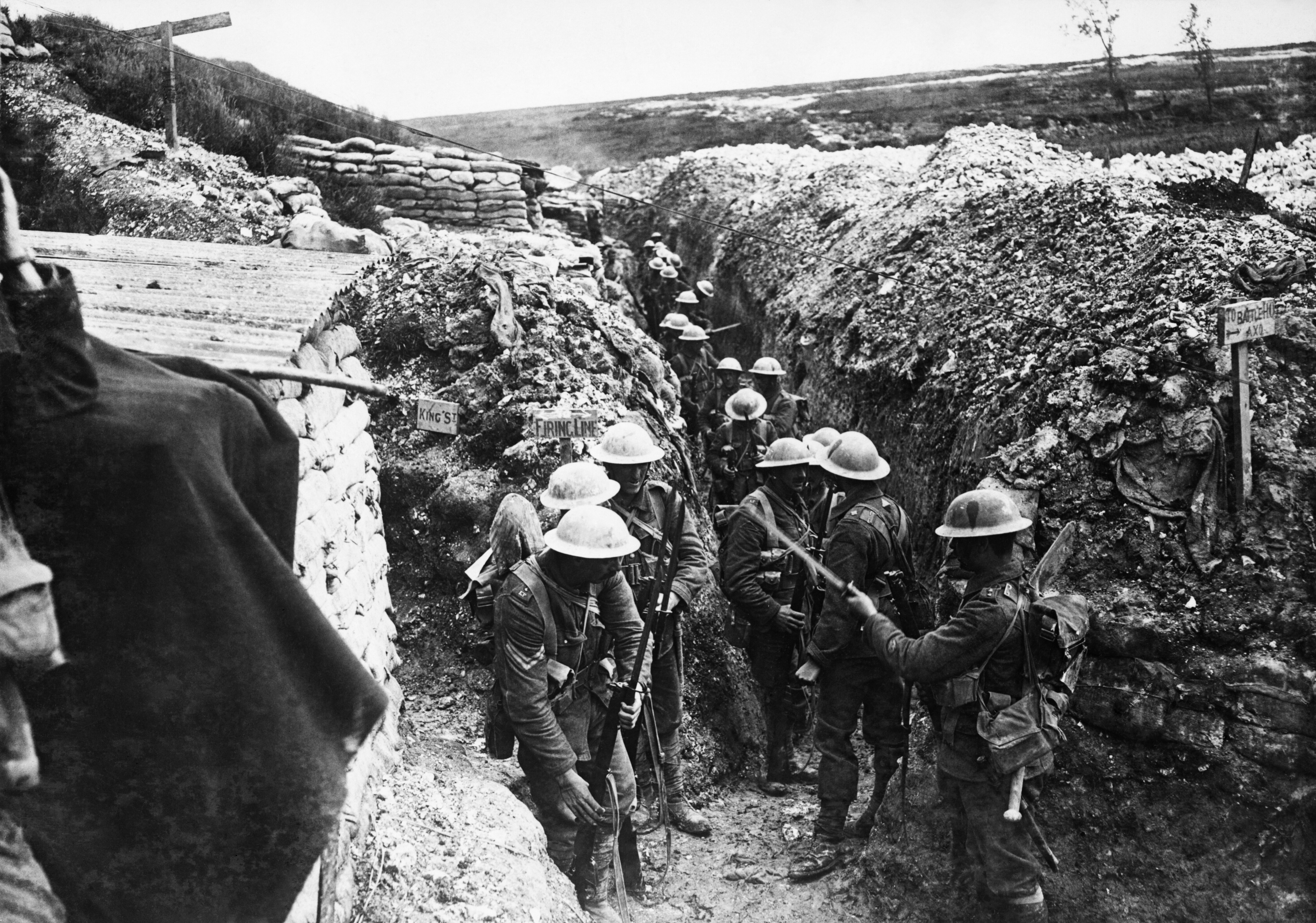
Men of the 1st Battalion, Lancashire Fusiliers in a communication trench near Beaumont Hamel, in 1916. Photo by Ernest Brooks.

The 2nd Battalion landed at Boulogne as part of the 12th Brigade in the 4th Division in August 1914 and also saw action on the Western Front. Between November 1915 and February 1916, the brigade was part of 36th (Ulster) Division before returning to the 4th Division.

==== Special Reserve ====
The 3rd (Reserve) and 4th (Extra Reserve) Battalions spent the whole war in England, the 3rd Bn in the Humber Garrison and the 4th initially at Barrow-in-Furness and later in the Severn Garrison. They fulfilled their dual role of coast defence and preparing reinforcement drafts of regular reservists, special reservists, recruits and returning wounded for the regular battalions serving overseas. Thousands of men would have passed through their ranks during the war. While at Hull, the 3rd Battalion assisted in the formation of 13th (Reserve) Battalion, Lancashire Fusiliers, from Kitchener's Army volunteers.

==== Territorial Force ====
Soon after the outbreak of war, the formation of Reserve or 2nd Line units for each existing TF unit was authorised. These units took the 'prefix '2/' while the parent battalions took '1/'. Eventually, both 1st and 2nd Line battalions went overseas and 3rd Line battalions were raised to supply recruits.

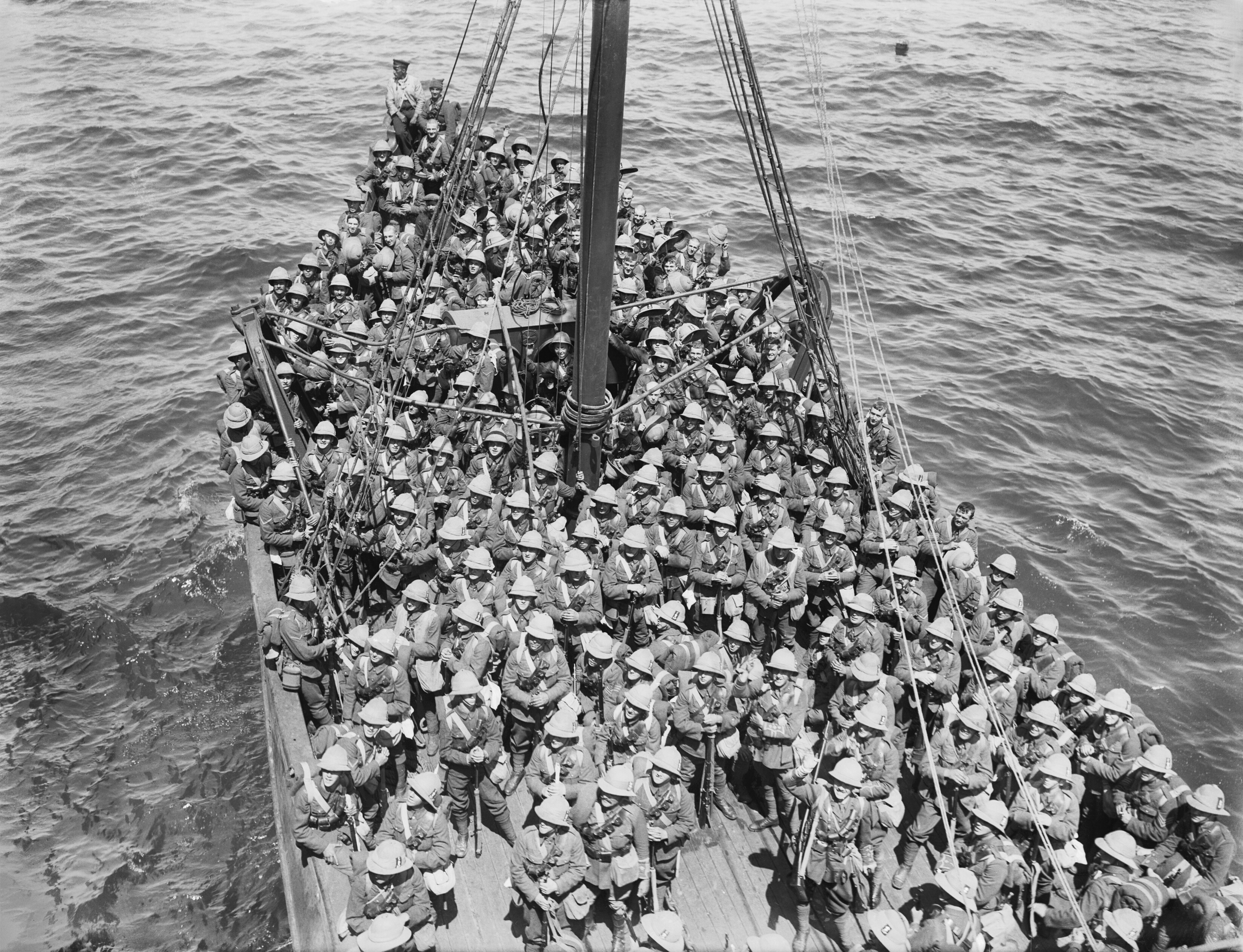
A boat carrying men of the Lancashire Fusiliers, bound for Gallipoli. Photo by Ernest Brooks.

The 1/5th Battalion, 1/6th Battalion, 1/7th Battalion and 1/8th Battalion all landed at Cape Helles, as part of the 125th (Lancashire Fusiliers) Brigade, in early May 1915. They took part in the Second Battle of Krithia (6–8 May) under command of the 29th Division. The brigade later rejoined the 42nd (East Lancashire) Division for the Third Battle of Krithia and Battle of Krithia Vineyard.

Evacuated from Gallipoli in December 1915, these four battalions landed on Moudros and proceeded to Egypt. From there they were transferred to Marseille in February 1917 for service on the Western Front.

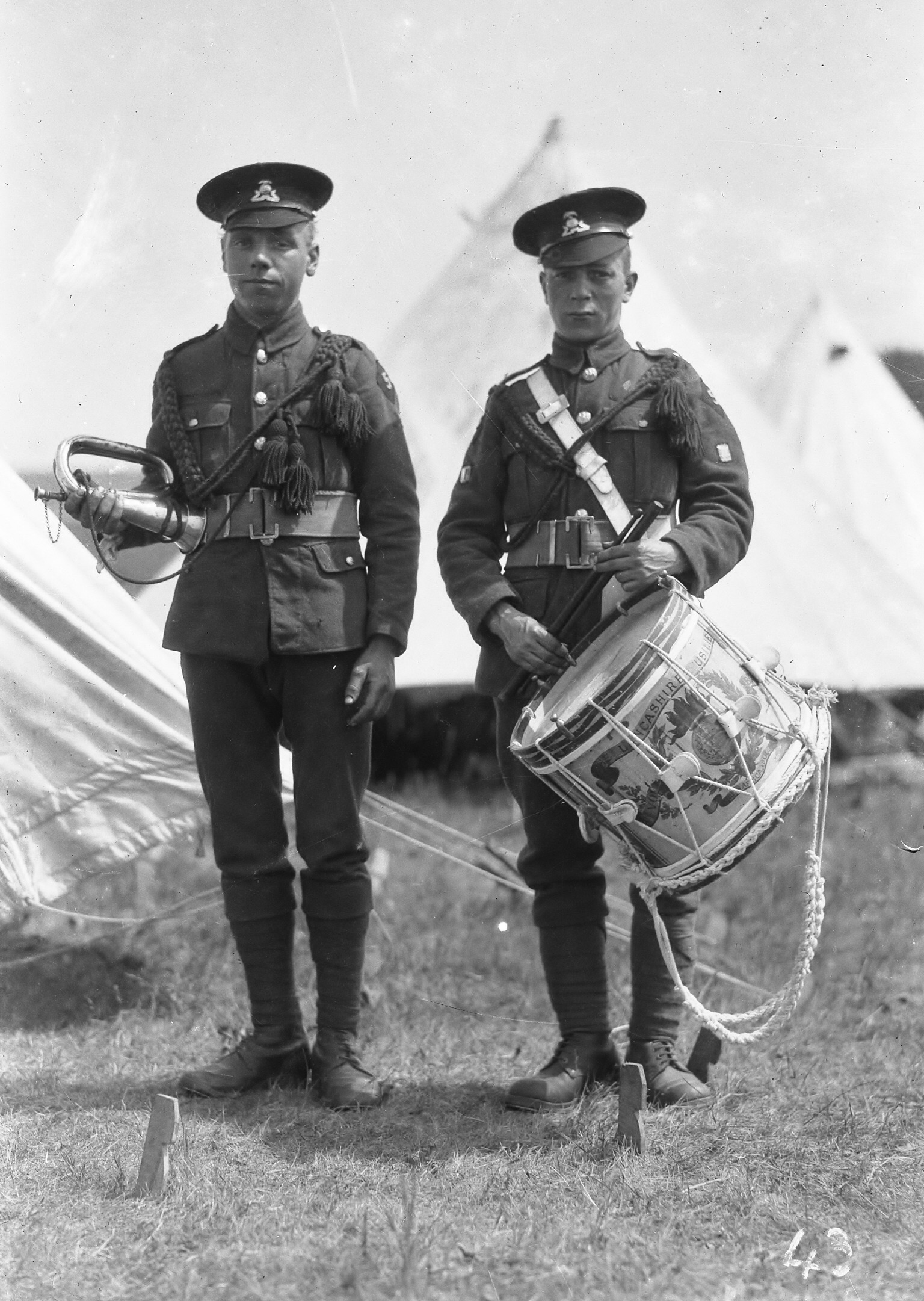
5th Battalion drummer and bugler.

The 2/5th Battalion landed at Boulogne as part of the 3rd Highland Brigade in the Highland Division in May 1915 for service on the Western Front.

The 2/6th Battalion, 2/7th Battalion and 2/8th Battalion all landed at Le Havre as part of the 197th Brigade in the 66th (2nd East Lancashire) Division in February 1917 also for service on the Western Front.

The 3/5th Battalion landed at Le Havre as part of same brigade in March 1917 also for service on the Western Front.

After the losses incurred during the German spring offensive in March 1918, the remains of the 2/7th Bn were reduced to a cadre and used to train newly arrived US Army units for trench warfare. The cadre returned to England and was reconstituted as 24th Battalion. This was a training unit based at Cromer until the end of the war.

==== New Army Battalions ====
The 9th (Service) Battalion waded ashore in deep water and darkness at Suvla Bay on the night of 6/7 August 1915, as part of 34th Brigade of 11th (Northern) Division, and were pinned down on the beach losing their commanding officer, Lieutenant-Colonel H. M. Welstead, and a number of officers. Evacuated from Gallipoli in December 1915, it moved to Egypt and was then transferred to France in July 1916 for service on the Western Front.

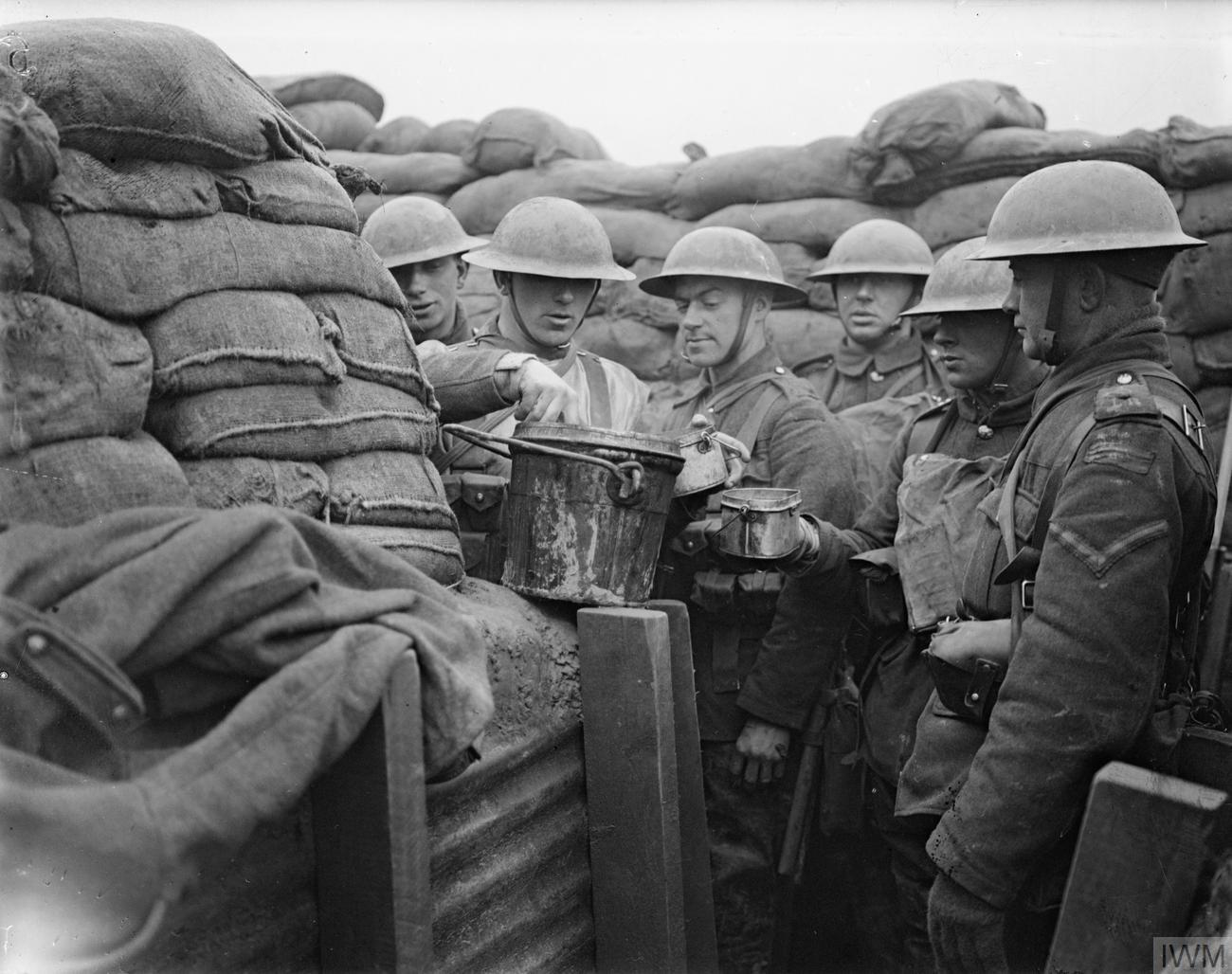
Serving hot stew to the troops of the Lancashire Fusiliers in the front line trench from a container. Opposite Messines, near Ploegsteert Wood, March 1917.

The 10th (Service) Battalion landed at Boulogne as part of the 52nd Brigade in the 17th (Northern) Division in July 1915 for service on the Western Front.

The 11th (Service) Battalion landed at Boulogne in September 1915 as part of the 74th Brigade of the 25th Division; The well known writer of The Hobbit and The Lord of the Rings, J. R. R. Tolkien served with this battalion until contracting trench fever and being sent home during the Battle of the Somme in October 1916.

The 12th (Service) Battalion landed at Boulogne as part of the 65th Brigade in the 22nd Division in September 1915 but moved with the division to Salonika, arriving in November 1915 before moving to France for service on the Western Front in July 1918.

The 15th (Service) Battalion (1st Salford) and 16th (Service) Battalion (2nd Salford) landed at Boulogne as part of the 96th Brigade in the 32nd Division in November 1915 also for service on the Western Front.

The 17th (Service) Battalion (1st South East Lancashire) and 18th (Service) Battalion (2nd South East Lancashire) landed at Le Havre as part of the 104th Brigade in the 35th Division in January 1916 also for service on the Western Front.

The 19th (Service) Battalion (3rd Salford) (Pioneers) landed at Le Havre as part of the 96th Brigade in the 32nd Division in November 1915 also for service on the Western Front.

The 20th (Service) Battalion (4th Salford) landed at Le Havre as part of the 104th Brigade in the 35th Division in January 1916 also for service on the Western Front.

==== War memorial ====
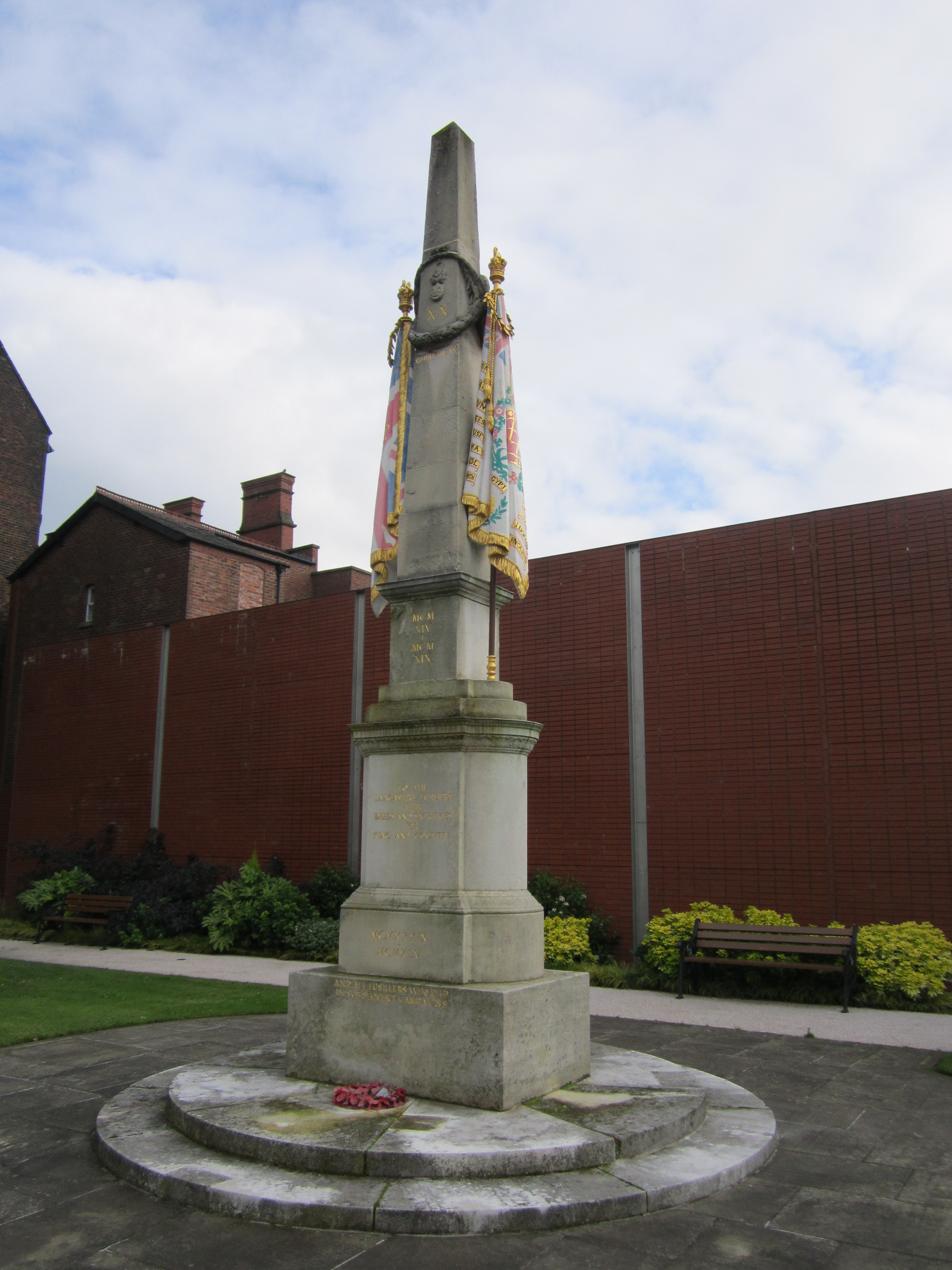
The Lancashire Fusiliers War Memorial in Bury.

A war memorial to the regiment, commissioned in honour of its First World War casualties, was erected outside Wellington Barracks in Bury, opposite the regimental headquarters. With the demolition of the barracks, the memorial was relocated to Gallipoli Garden in the town. It was designed by Sir Edwin Lutyens, famous for the Cenotaph in London, whose father and great uncle served in the Lancashire Fusiliers. After the amalgamation into the Royal Regiment of Fusiliers, the memorial was re-dedicated to all fusiliers killed in service.

=== Second World War ===
==== Regular Army battalions ====
After recovering its numbers from the First World War, the 1st Battalion, Lancashire Fusiliers spent the interwar period based in various garrisons around the British Empire. In 1939, upon the outbreak of the Second World War, the battalion was based in British India. During the Burma Campaign, the 1st Battalion fought with various units until 1943 when it became a Chindits formation with the 77th Indian Infantry Brigade, which was commanded by Brigadier Orde Wingate. The battalion was involved in both major Chindit operations, suffering many casualties before the war ended.

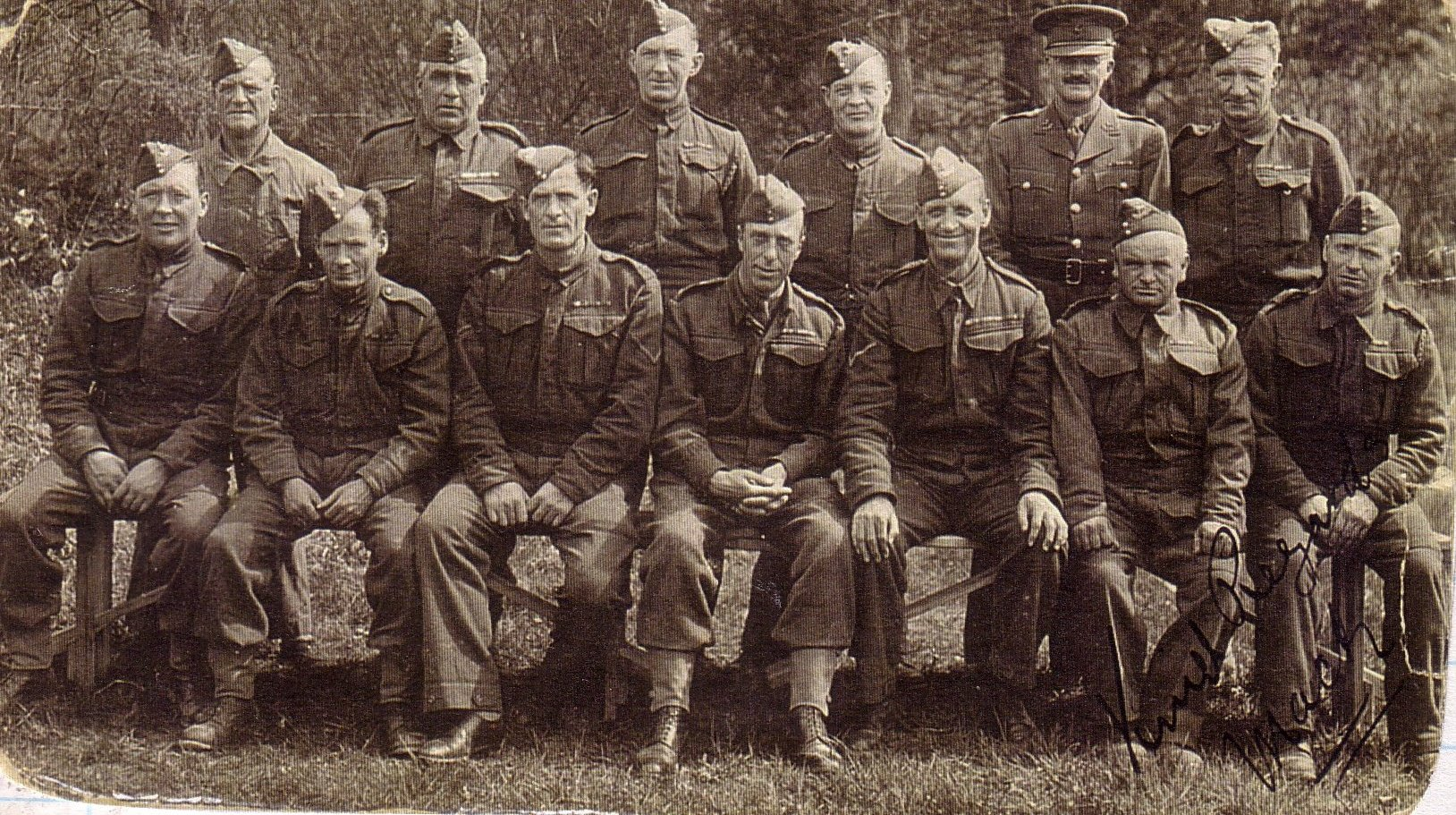
Group of Tommies from the 2nd Battalion, Lancashire Fusiliers during the Second World War

From the outbreak of war in 1939 to 1940, the 2nd Battalion, Lancashire Fusiliers was deployed with the 11th Infantry Brigade, alongside the 1st East Surreys and 1st Oxford and Bucks Light Infantry (later replaced by the 5th Northants). The brigade was part of the 4th Infantry Division and was sent overseas in October 1939 to join the British Expeditionary Force (BEF). The 2nd Battalion fought against the German Army in the battles of Belgium and France, until being forced to retreat to Dunkirk and were evacuated back to the United Kingdom, where they stayed until late 1942, anticipating a German invasion. In June 1942, the 11th Brigade, of whom the 2nd Lancashire Fusiliers were a part, was transferred to the newly created 78th Infantry Division. They then served in the final stages of the North African Campaign, the Tunisian Campaign, where the 78th Battleaxe Division gained an excellent reputation, Medjez El Bab, Sicily, and the Italian Campaign (as part of the Gothic Line). During the fighting in Italy, Fusilier Frank Jefferson was awarded the Victoria Cross.

A former member of the battalion, Wallace Jackson, died on Thursday, 12 November 2009 aged 89 years.

==== Territorial Army battalions ====
The 1/5th Battalion was a 1st-Line Territorial Army (TA) unit serving in the 42nd (East Lancashire) Infantry Division with the 1/6th and 1/8th battalions in the 125th Infantry brigade. They were sent to France in April 1940 to join the rest of the British Expeditionary Force (BEF) and fought in the Battle of Dunkirk and were evacuated to Britain. In 1941, the battalion was converted to armour as the 108th Regiment Royal Armoured Corps (Lancashire Fusiliers). Units converted in this way continued to wear their infantry cap badge on the black beret of the Royal Armoured Corps.

The 1/6th Battalion served alongside the 1/5th Battalion in France in April–June 1940 and were driven back to Dunkirk. In 1941, this 1st-Line TA Battalion was converted, like the 1/5th Battalion, to armour as 109th Regiment Royal Armoured Corps.

In 1936, the 7th Battalion was converted into 39th (The Lancashire Fusiliers) Anti-Aircraft Battalion, Royal Engineers, based in Salford. After mobilising in August 1939 to defend potential targets such as the Manchester Ship Canal and Barton Power Station during the Phoney War, it served in the Orkney Islands, guarding the Scapa Flow naval base. It returned to Lancashire in early 1941 to defend Liverpool during the May Blitz. In the summer of 1940, while serving in 53 Anti-Aircraft Brigade, covering the North Midlands, it was transferred as a Searchlight Regiment to the Royal Artillery (the day of the actual transfer, 1 August (Minden Day), was considered auspicious by the battalion). In May 1943, the regiment was reduced to a cadre under its old title of 7th Bn LF and took no further part in the war, but several of its batteries continued an independent existence, continuing to wear the Lancashire Fusiliers badge and to celebrate Minden Day. 354th and 357th Searchlight Batteries (the latter converted into 414th Light Anti-Aircraft Battery) defended Southern England against V-1 flying bomb attacks in the summer of 1944 ('Operation Diver'). 356th Searchlight Battery took part in D-Day and was later converted into a 'Moonlight Battery' to provide 'movement light' or 'Monty's moonlight' to assist 21st Army Group's night operations during the campaign in North West Europe.

The 1/8th Battalion began the war in 125th Brigade with the 1/5th and 1/6th Battalions, but while in France with the British Expeditionary Force (BEF) it exchanged with the 1st Battalion, Border Regiment into the 4th Infantry Brigade part of the 2nd Infantry Division, as part of official BEF policy to mix the Regular and Territorial armies. During the Battle of France, the 1/8th Lancashire Fusiliers, along with the 1st Battalion, Royal Scots and the 2nd Battalion Royal Norfolk Regiment, were overrun on 26–27 May 1940 around the village of Locon, 2 kilometres north of Bethune, by advancing German troops. Several massacres of Allied prisoners took place shortly thereafter, such as the Le Paradis massacre, primarily by the German SS Totenkopf Division. Later, the battalion fought in the Burma Campaign and participated in many famous battles, such as the Battle of Kohima, serving in the British Fourteenth Army under Bill Slim.

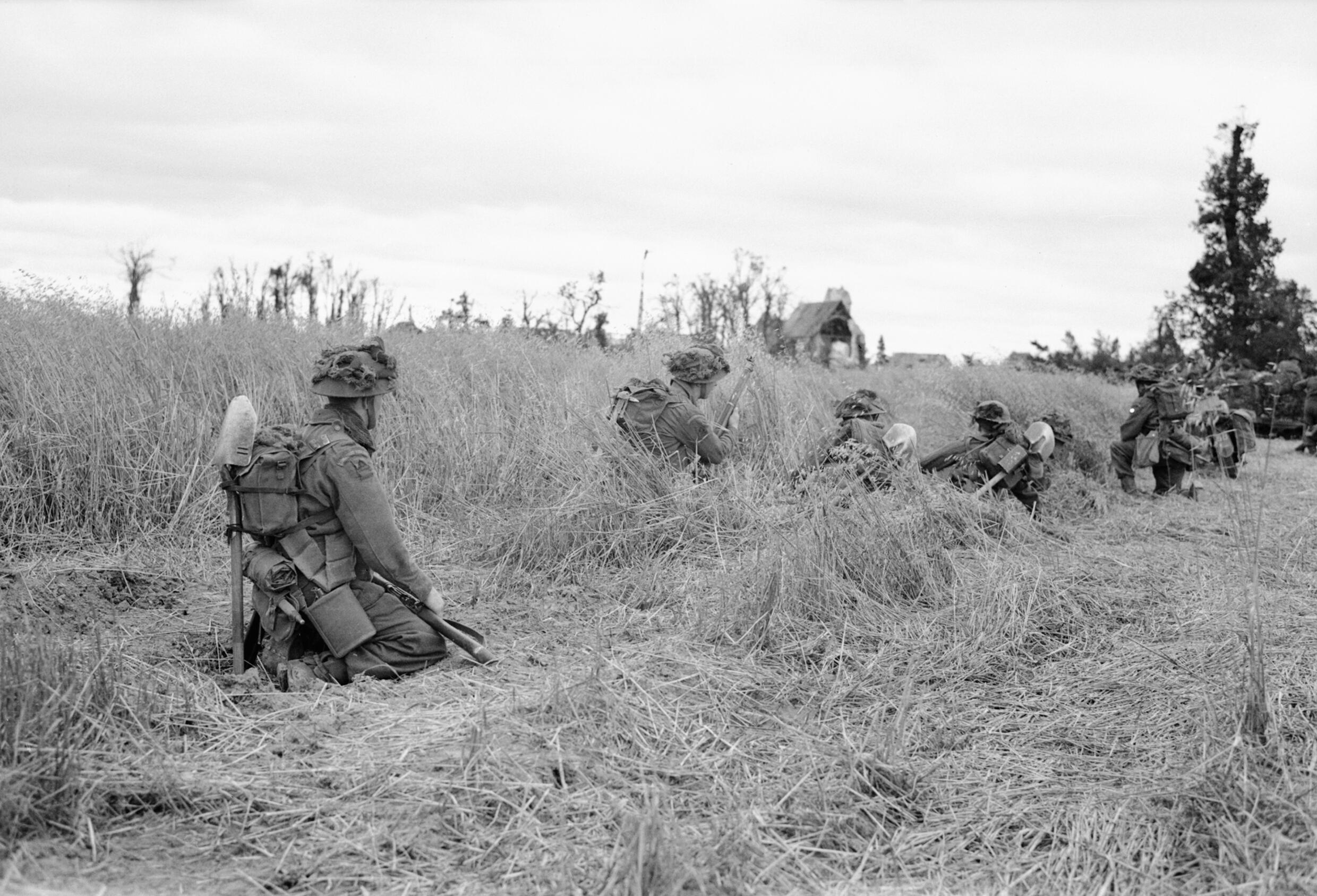
Men of the 2/5th Battalion, Lancashire Fusiliers crawl cautiously through a cornfield near St Contest, Normandy, 9 July 1944.

The 2/5th Battalion, Lancashire Fusiliers was formed in 1939 as a duplicate of the 1/5th. It was part of the 197th Infantry Brigade, the 2nd-Line duplicate of the 1st-Line 125th Infantry Brigade. It served with the 66th Infantry Division until 23 June 1940, when the division disbanded. The brigade was then transferred to the 59th (Staffordshire) Infantry Division. They landed in Normandy as part of Operation Overlord on 29 June 1944 and first saw action in early July at Malon on the North West outskirts of Caen as part of Operation Charnwood, where they suffered 121 casualties. They also took part in Operation Pomegranate and the battles on the Orne River. Of all the companies in this battalion, B Company stood out for the highest number of officers killed (in just two months, B Company lost three commanding officers, and all officers on a company attack just outside Vendes). On 21 August 1944, the divisional commander, Major-General Lewis Lyne, late of the regiment, visited the battalion and informed them that the 59th Division was to be disbanded, due to a severe shortage of infantryman at the time, in order to provide replacements for other infantry units, and most had been battered during the recent heavy fighting. As a result, on 26 August, the battalion was officially disbanded and the companies were dispatched to different British battalions and divisions in the 21st Army Group. A Company was sent to 7th Royal Welch Fusiliers (53rd (Welsh) Division), B Company to 2nd Gordon Highlanders (15th (Scottish) Division), C Company to 2nd Glasgow Highlanders (15th (Scottish) Division) and D Company to 1st East Lancashire Regiment (53rd (Welsh) Division). The 59th Division was considered by General Sir Bernard Montgomery to be one of the best and most reliable divisions in his 21st Army Group; it was only chosen for disbandment because it was the youngest British division in France. The Battalion War Diary claimed it to be "A sad day. 5 years of training for 8 weeks fighting, and unfortunately the break up of the battalion leaves the Regiment without representative in this Theatre of War".

The 2/6th Battalion, Lancashire Fusiliers came into being as a 2nd Line duplicate of the 1/6th Battalion. Like the 2/5th Battalion, the 2/6th Battalion was also part of 197th Infantry Brigade in the 66th Infantry Division and was also transferred to 59th (Staffordshire) Infantry Division after 66th Division disbanded. However, in October 1942, the battalion was transferred elsewhere when it was replaced in the 197th Brigade by the 1/7th Battalion, Royal Warwickshire Regiment. The 2/6th Battalion remained in the United Kingdom throughout the war, serving with many different brigades, including the 211th infantry Brigade (part of the 80th Infantry (Reserve) Division) from October 1942 to October 1943. From July 1944, the battalion served with the 203rd Infantry Brigade, part of the 77th Holding Division, and acted in a training role for the rest of the war. This 2/8th Battalion was formed as a duplicate of the 1/8th Battalion and began the war in the 199th Infantry Brigade, alongside the 6th and 7th Manchester Regiment, part of the 66th Infantry Division and later was transferred to the 55th (West Lancashire) Infantry Division when the 66th Division was disbanded in July 1940. It did not leave the United Kingdom and was disbanded in October 1944.

==== Hostilities-only battalions ====
The 9th (Service) Battalion, Lancashire Fusiliers was a hostilities-only battalion raised in June 1940 The battalion, commanded initially by Lieutenant Colonel Lewis Lyne, was very briefly assigned to the 208th Independent Infantry Brigade (Home) until December, when it was reassigned to the 125th Infantry Brigade, part of 42nd (East Lancashire) Infantry Division, alongside the 1/5th and 1/6th Lancashire Fusiliers. Both the brigade and division had seen active service earlier in the year in Belgium, France and Dunkirk. In late 1941, the 9th Battalion was converted to armour as 143rd Regiment Royal Armoured Corps. However, the regiment was disbanded in 1943.

The 10th (Service) Battalion was also raised in 1940 and served for a year in 208th Independent Infantry Brigade (Home), alongside the 9th Battalion, 13th King's Regiment (Liverpool) and 22nd Royal Fusiliers. In 1942, it was shipped to India and fought in the Arakan Campaign 1942–1943 as part of 7th Indian Infantry Division, with 23rd Indian Infantry Brigade. The battalion was disbanded on 31 October 1945.

The 11th (Service) Battalion was a hostilities-only battalion raised in 1940, originally as the 50th (Holding) Battalion, whose role was to temporarily 'hold' men who were medically unfit, awaiting orders, on courses or returning from abroad. In October 1940, the battalion was redesignated the 11th Battalion. The 11th Battalion served in the garrison of Malta during the Siege with the 233rd Infantry Brigade. In July 1944, it was to be disbanded but instead it was transferred to the 66th Infantry Brigade, serving alongside the 2nd Battalion, Royal Scots, a Regular unit, and 1st Battalion, Hertfordshire Regiment, a Territorial. The brigade became part of 1st Infantry Division, which was serving in the Italian Campaign, where it took part in the fighting on the Gothic Line, suffering severe casualties. Early in 1945, the 11th Battalion was transferred to Palestine with the rest of the 1st Infantry Division and remained there for the rest of the war.

=== Post-1945 ===
==== Regular Battalions ====
In 1948, all infantry regiments of the British Army were reduced to only a single regular battalion and the 2nd Battalion was disbanded and merged with the 1st Battalion.

The battalion served in East Africa in 1952 during the Mau Mau rebellion.

In 1968, the regiment was amalgamated with the other regiments of the Fusilier Brigade – the Royal Northumberland Fusiliers, Royal Warwickshire Fusiliers and the Royal Fusiliers (City of London Regiment) – to form the Royal Regiment of Fusiliers.

==== Territorial Battalions ====
The 5th Battalion was reformed but disbanded when the TA was reduced into the TAVR in 1967. The battalion's lineage was continued by retaining a company in the 4th Battalion Queen's Lancashire Regiment and subsequently the Lancastrian and Cumbrian Volunteers on its formation in 1999. The other TA battalions were all reconstituted as anti-aircraft (AA) units in Anti-Aircraft Command:

- 633 (6th Bn Lancashire Fusiliers) Light AA Regiment, Royal Artillery
- 574th (7th Bn Lancashire Fusiliers) (Mixed) Heavy AA Regiment, RA, ('mixed' indicating that members of the Women's Royal Army Corps were integrated into the unit)
- 634 (8th Bn Lancashire Fusiliers) Heavy AA Regiment, RA, later renumbered 310 HAA Rgt

AA Command was disbanded in 1955, and a number of disbandments and mergers took place among TA air defence units: 633 LAA Regiment was disbanded, while four HAA regiments in the Manchester area, including 574 and 310, formed a new 314 HAA Regiment. By this merger, the 7th and 8th Bns Lancashire Fusiliers, both descended from the 56th Lancashire RVC, were brought back together. They formed Q (Salford) Battery in the new regiment.

On 1 May 1961, Q Battery transferred to 253 Field Regiment (The Bolton Artillery). Since the reduction of the TA in 1967, the Bolton Artillery has existed as a battery of 103 (Lancashire Artillery Volunteers) Regiment RA, but it no longer has a presence in Salford.

== Regimental museum ==
A collection of military memorabilia and educational displays are in the Fusilier Museum in Bury.

== Battle honours ==
The regiment's battle honours were as follows:

- Dettingen, Minden, Egmont-op-Zee, Egypt, Maida, Vimiera, Corunna, Vittoria, Pyrenees, Orthes, Toulouse, Peninsula, Alma, Inkerman, Sevastopol, Lucknow, Khartoum, Relief of Ladysmith, South Africa 1899–1902
- Great War (30 Battalions): Le Cateau, Retreat from Mons, Marne 1914, Aisne 1914 '18, Armentières 1914, Ypres 1915 '17 '18, St. Julien, Bellewaarde, Somme 1916 '18, Albert 1916 '18, Bazentin, Delville Wood, Pozières, Ginchy, Flers-Courcelette, Morval, Thiepval, Le Transloy, Ancre Heights, Ancre 1916 '18, Arras 1917 '18, Scarpe 1917 '18, Arleux, Messines 1917, Pilckem, Langemarck 1917, Menin Road, Polygon Wood, Broodseinde, Poelcappelle, Passchendaele, Cambrai 1917 '18, St. Quentin, Bapaume 1918, Rosières, Lys, Estaires, Hazebrouck, Bailleul, Kemmel, Béthune, Scherpenberg, Amiens, Drocourt-Quéant, Hindenburg Line, Épéhy, Canal du Nord, St. Quentin Canal, Courtrai, Selle, Sambre, France and Flanders 1914–18, Doiran 1917, Macedonia 1915–18, Helles, Landing at Helles, Krithia, Suvla, Landing at Suvla, Scimitar Hill, Gallipoli 1915, Rumani, Egypt 1915–17
- Second World War (12 Battalions): Defence of Escaut, St. Omer-La Bassée, Caen, North-West Europe 1940 '44, Medjez el Bab, Oued Zarga, North Africa 1942–43, Adrano, Sicily 1943, Termoli, Trigno, Sangro, Cassino II, Trasimene Line, Monte Ceco, Monte Spaduro, Senio, Argenta Gap, Italy 1943–45, Malta 1941–42, Rathedaung, Htizwe, Kohima, Naga Village, Chindits 1944, Burma 1943–45

== Victoria Cross recipients ==
The following members of the regiment were awarded the Victoria Cross:

- Captain (Temporary Major) Cuthbert Bromley, Great War
- Sergeant Frank Edward Stubbs, Great War
- Lance-Corporal (later Lieutenant-Colonel) John Elisha Grimshaw, Great War
- Captain (later Major) Richard Raymond Willis, Great War
- Sergeant Alfred Joseph Richards, Great War
- Private (later Lance-Sergeant) William Stephen Kenealy, Great War
- Private John Lynn, Great War
- Private (later Corporal) James Hutchinson, Great War
- Captain (Temporary Lieutenant-Colonel) Bertram Best-Dunkley, Great War
- Sergeant Joseph Lister, Great War
- Second Lieutenant Bernard Matthew Cassidy, Great War
- Temporary Second Lieutenant John Schofield, Great War
- Lance-Corporal Joel Halliwell, Great War
- Lance-Sergeant (later Lieutenant) Edward Benn Smith, Great War
- Acting Sergeant Harold John Colley, Great War
- Private Frank Lester, Great War
- Sergeant (later Regimental Sergeant-Major) James Clarke, Great War
- Acting Lieutenant-Colonel James Neville Marshall, Great War
- Fusilier (later Lance-Corporal) Francis Arthur Jefferson, Second World War

== Colonels of the Regiment ==
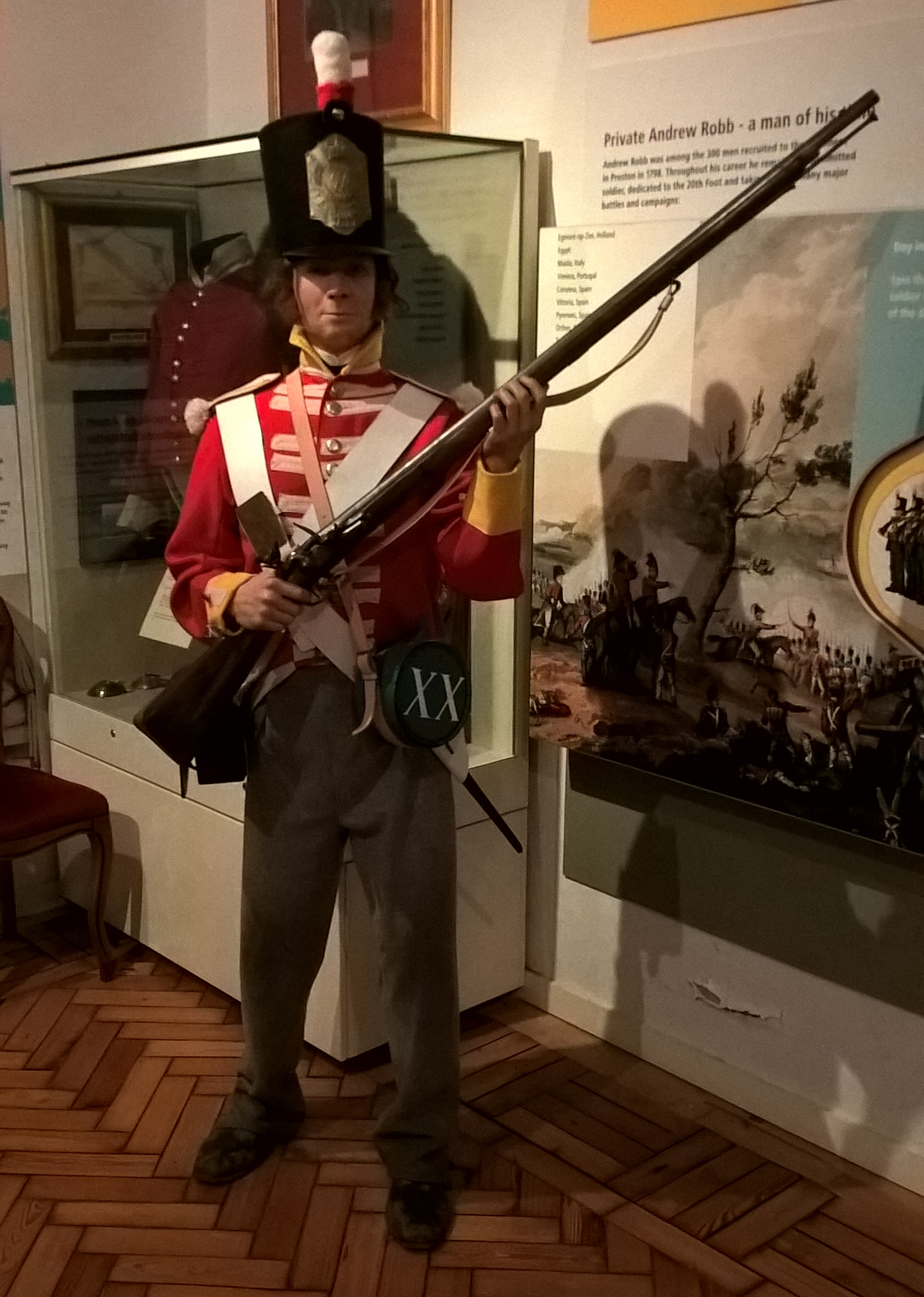
Part of the display at the Fusilier Museum

Colonels of the regiment were:

- 1688–1689: Col. Sir Robert Peyton
- 1689–1706: Maj-Gen. Gustavus Hamilton, 1st Viscount Boyne
- 1706–1714: Maj-Gen. John Newton
- 1714–1719: Lt-Gen. Thomas Meredyth
- 1719–1732: Col. Hon. William Egerton
- 1732–1737: Brig-Gen. Francis Howard, 1st Earl of Effingham
- 1737–1740: Lt-Gen. Richard St. George
- 1740: Col. Alexander Rose
- 1740–1746: Lt-Gen. Thomas Bligh
- 1746–1749: Lt-Gen. George Germain, 1st Viscount Sackville
- 1749–1755: Lt-Gen. George Keppel, 3rd Earl of Albemarle, KG (Viscount Bury)

=== The 20th Regiment of Foot ===
- 1755–1756: Gen. Philip Honeywood
- 1756–1769: Lt-Gen. William Kingsley
- 1769–1773: Gen. Bernard Hale
- 1773–1782: Lt-Gen. Hon. George Lane Parker

=== The 20th (East Devon) Regiment of Foot ===
- 1782–1789: Lt-Gen. William Wynyard
- 1789–1797: Lt-Gen. West Hyde
- 1797–1809: Gen. Charles Leigh
- 1809–1815: Lt-Gen Sir John Stuart, Count of Maida GCB
- 1815–1842: Gen Sir William Houston, 1st Baronet GCB GCH
- 1842–1850: Lt-Gen. Sir James Stevenson Burns KCB
- 1850–1853: Lt-Gen. Sir Andrew Pilkington, KCB
- 1853: Lt-Gen. Sir William Chalmers, CB, KCH
- 1853: Maj-Gen. Henry Godwin, CB
- 1853–1854: Lt-Gen. Sir Nathaniel Thorn, KCB, KH
- 1854–1858: Lt-Gen. Henry Thomas, CB
- 1858–1876: Gen. Marcus Beresford
- 1876–1894: Gen. Sir Frederick Horn, GCB

=== The Lancashire Fusiliers ===
- 1894–1897: Gen. Sir William Pollexfen Radcliffe, KCB
- 1897–1909: Gen. Sir Edward Alan Holdich, GCB
- 1909–1914: Maj-Gen. Sir William Drummond Scrase-Dickins, KCB
- 1914–1926: Maj-Gen. Charles James Blomfield, CB, DSO
- 1926–1945: Maj-Gen. George Henry Basil Freeth, CB, CMG, DSO
- 1945–1955: Maj-Gen. George Surtees, CB, CBE, MC
- 1955–1965: Brig. Percy Geoffrey Bamford, CBE, DSO
- 1965–1968: Lt-Gen. Sir George Harris Lea, KCB, DSO, MBE
- 1968: Regiment amalgamated with The Royal Northumberland Fusiliers, The Royal Warwickshire Fusiliers, and The Royal Fusiliers (City of London Regiment), to form The Royal Regiment of Fusiliers

== Football ==
The football team of the 1st Battalion was a member of the Irish Football League for the 1891-92 season, while deployed in Victoria Barracks, Belfast, and won the Army Cup in 1896-97 while deployed to Custume Barracks, Athlone.

== In popular culture ==
In the television series Downton Abbey, the character Beryl Patmore has a nephew who serves with the Lancashire Fusiliers during the First World War.
