= Royal Berkshire Regiment War Memorial =

First World War memorial in Brock Barracks in Reading, Berkshire, England

- United Kingdom
- For men of the Royal Berkshire Regiment killed in the First World War
- Unveiled: 13 September 1921
- Location: 51.458274°N 1.004418°W; Brock Barracks, Reading, Berkshire
- Designed by: Sir Edwin Lutyens

Listed Building – Grade II*
- Official name: The Royal Berkshire Regiment Cenotaph
- Designated: 22 December 1975
- Reference no.: 1321912

The Royal Berkshire Regiment War Memorial or Royal Berkshire Regiment Cenotaph is a First World War memorial dedicated to members of the Royal Berkshire Regiment and located in Brock Barracks in Reading, Berkshire, in south-east England. Unveiled in 1921, the memorial was designed by Sir Edwin Lutyens, based on his design for the Cenotaph on Whitehall in London, and is today a Grade II* listed building.

== Background ==
In the aftermath of the First World War and its unprecedented casualties, thousands of war memorials were built across Britain. Amongst the most prominent designers of memorials was the architect Sir Edwin Lutyens, described by Historic England as "the leading English architect of his generation". Lutyens designed the Cenotaph on Whitehall in London, which became the focus for the national Remembrance Sunday commemorations, as well as the Thiepval Memorial to the Missing—the largest British war memorial anywhere in the world—and the Stone of Remembrance which appears in all large Commonwealth War Graves Commission cemeteries and in several of Lutyens' civic war memorials. The Royal Berkshire Regiment memorial is one of seven cenotaphs in England designed by Lutyens besides the one on Whitehall, and one of two to serve as a memorial for a regiment (the other being the Queen's Own Royal West Kent Regiment Cenotaph in Maidstone, though the Welch Regiment War Memorial in Cardiff, Wales, is also a regimental memorial in the form of a cenotaph).

The Royal Berkshire Regiment quickly decided that it wanted a copy of Whitehall's cenotaph for its own war memorial and duly commissioned Lutyens, who appears to have been happy to design reduced-scale versions of the cenotaph to accommodate for smaller budgets, unlike the Stone of Remembrance, which he insisted must never be reduced in size. The Royal West Kent memorial was built to two-thirds scale, while the Royal Berkshire's version is half size.

== History and design ==
The memorial was built by GE Wallis and Sons Ltd of Maidstone, who also built the Royal West Kent Regiment's memorial, at a cost of £3,000 (1921). Major General Edward Thompson Dickson, the colonel of the Royal Berkshire Regiment, unveiled the cenotaph on 13 September 1921. The regiment's roll of honour was placed inside the cenotaph during the unveiling ceremony.

Customary for a Lutyens memorial, the cenotaph stands on a base of three steps and is in Portland stone; it is situated on a lawned area within Brock Barracks, formerly the headquarters of the Royal Berkshire Regiment. At the very top of the structure is an urn—a feature Lutyens originally proposed for the cenotaph on Whitehall and which features on the Arch of Remembrance in Leicester. The urn sits on top of a chest tomb, and a three-staged base connects it to the main shaft, which is set back slightly towards the top; the shaft itself is moulded onto a base of two rectangular blocks. Although richer than other memorials, the cenotaph is still sparsely decorated. Attached to it are two painted stone flags carved by Eric Broadbent—the King's Colour on the west side and the regiment's colour on the east—which are joined to moulded wreaths on the ends by laurel swags. Painted flags featured in Lutyens' original proposal for the Whitehall cenotaph (Lutyens proposed six, though the Royal Berkshire Regiment's memorial only features two), but were rejected in favour of fabric, though they feature on several of his other memorials.

On the north face, the memorial is inscribed: "TO THE MEMORY OF OFFICERS, WARRANT OFFICERS, NON-COMMISSIONED OFFICERS, AND MEN OF THE ROYAL BERKSHIRE REGIMENT", while the south side reads: "THIS MEMORIAL WAS ERECTED BY PAST AND PRESENT OFFICERS AND MEN OF THE ROYAL BERKSHIRE REGIMENT AND THEIR RELATIVES IN MEMORY OF THE 353 OFFICERS AND 6375 OTHER RANKS OF THE REGIMENT WHO FELL IN THE GREAT WAR 1914 – 1918 / RE-DEDICATED TO THE MEMORY OF THE 93 OFFICERS AND 974 OTHER RANKS OF THE REGIMENT WHO FELL IN THE SECOND WORLD WAR 1939 – 1945". The names of the dead are inscribed on a wall to the north of the cenotaph.

The memorial was designated a Grade II listed building on 22 December 1975. In October 2015, as part of commemorations for the centenary of the First World War, Lutyens' war memorials were recognised as a "national collection" and all of his free-standing memorials in England were listed or had their listing status reviewed and their National Heritage List for England list entries were updated and expanded. As part of this process, the Royal Berkshire Regiment memorial was upgraded to Grade II* listed building status, as was the Royal West Kent's memorial in Maidstone.

== See also ==
- Grade II* listed buildings in Berkshire
- Grade II* listed war memorials in England
