= The Cenotaph =

War memorial in Whitehall, London

- United Kingdom
- For the British and Commonwealth dead of both world wars and British dead from later wars
- Unveiled: 11 November 1920; 106 years ago
- Location: 51°30′09.6″N 0°07′34.1″W; Whitehall, London
- Designed by: Edwin Lutyens
- THE GLORIOUS DEAD

Listed Building – Grade I
- Official name: The Cenotaph
- Designated: 5 February 1970
- Reference no.: 1357354

The Cenotaph is a war memorial on Whitehall in London, England. Designed by Sir Edwin Lutyens, it was unveiled in 1920 as the United Kingdom's national memorial to the dead of Britain and the British Empire of the First World War. It was rededicated in 1946 to include those of the Second World War, and has since come to represent the Commonwealth casualties from those and later conflicts. The word cenotaph is derived from Greek, meaning 'empty tomb'. Most of the dead were buried close to where they fell; thus, the Cenotaph symbolises their absence and is a focal point for public mourning. The original temporary Cenotaph was erected in 1919 for a parade celebrating the end of the First World War, at which more than 15,000 servicemen, including French and American soldiers, saluted the monument. More than a million people visited the site within a week of the parade.

Calls for the Cenotaph to be rebuilt in permanent form began almost immediately. After some debate, the government agreed and construction work began in May 1920. Lutyens added entasis (curvature) but otherwise made minimal design alterations. The Cenotaph is built from Portland stone. It takes the form of a tomb chest atop a rectangular pylon, which diminishes as it rises. Three flags hang from each of the long sides. The memorial is austere, containing almost no decoration. The permanent Cenotaph was unveiled by King George V on 11 November 1920 in a ceremony combined with the repatriation of the Unknown Warrior, an unidentified British serviceman to be interred in Westminster Abbey. After the unveiling, millions more people visited the Cenotaph and the Unknown Warrior. The memorial met with public acclaim and has largely been praised by academics, though some Christian organisations disapproved of its lack of overt religious symbolism.

The Cenotaph has been revered since its unveiling, and while nationally important has been the scene of several political protests and vandalised with spray paint twice in the 21st century. The National Service of Remembrance is held annually at the site on Remembrance Sunday; it is also the scene of other remembrance services. The Cenotaph is a Grade I listed building and forms part of a national collection of Lutyens's war memorials. Dozens of replicas were built in Britain and other Commonwealth countries. While there was no set or agreed standard for First World War memorials, the Cenotaph proved to be one of the most influential models for such structures. Lutyens designed several other cenotaphs, which all shared common features with that at Whitehall. The Cenotaph has been the subject of several artworks and has featured in multiple works of literature, including a novel and several poems. The public acclaim for the monument was responsible for Lutyens becoming a national figure, and the Royal Institute of British Architects awarded him its Royal Gold Medal in 1921. For several years afterwards much of his time was taken up with war memorial commissions.

== Background ==
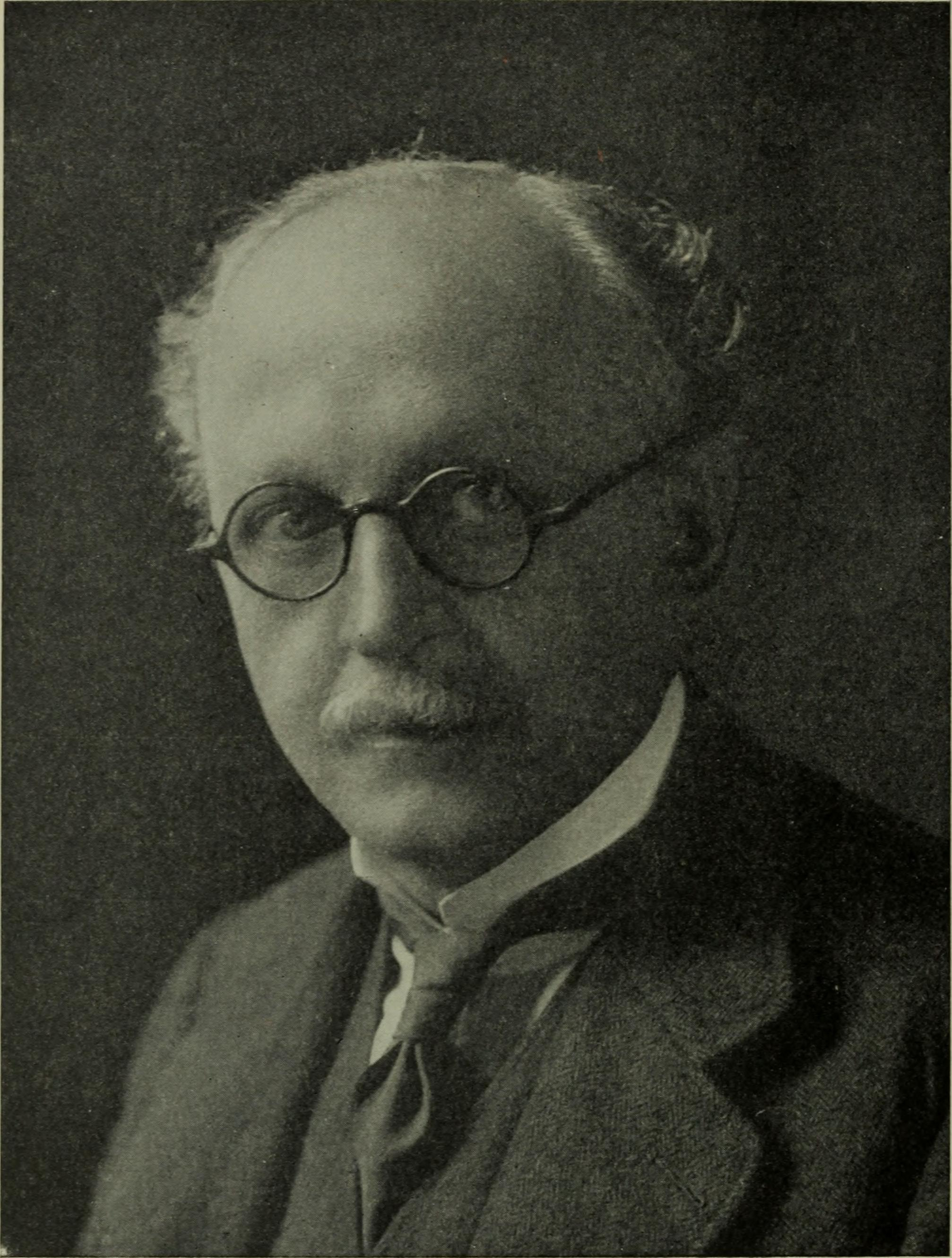
Sir Edwin Lutyens, designer of the Cenotaph

The First World War produced casualties on a scale previously unseen by developed nations. More than 1.1 million men from the British Empire were killed. In the war's aftermath, thousands of war memorials were erected across Britain and its empire, and on the former battlefields. Amongst the most prominent designers of war memorials was Sir Edwin Lutyens, described by Historic England as "the foremost architect of his day". Lutyens established his reputation designing country houses for wealthy clients around the turn of the 20th century; his first major public commission was the design of much of New Delhi, the new capital of British India. The war had a profound effect on Lutyens and following it he devoted much of his time to the commemoration of its casualties. By the time he was commissioned for the Cenotaph, he was already acting as an adviser to the Imperial War Graves Commission (IWGC). (Note: The IWGC is now known as the Commonwealth War Graves Commission (CWGC).) In 1917, he travelled to France under the auspices of the IWGC and was horrified by the scale of destruction. The experience influenced his later designs for war memorials and led him to the conclusion that a different form of architecture was required to properly memorialise the dead. He felt that neither realism nor expressionism could adequately capture the atmosphere at the end of the war.

Lutyens's first war memorial was the Rand Regiments Memorial (1911) in Johannesburg, South Africa, dedicated to casualties of the Second Boer War (1899–1902). His first commission for a memorial to the First World War was for Southampton Cenotaph. The word cenotaph derives from the Greek word kenotaphion, meaning 'empty tomb'. Lutyens first encountered the term in connection with Munstead Wood, in Busbridge, Surrey. There he designed a house for Gertrude Jekyll in the 1890s—one of his earliest major commissions. In the garden was a seat in the form of a rectangular block of elm set on stone, which Charles Liddell—a friend of Lutyens and Jekyll and a librarian at the British Museum—christened the "Cenotaph of Sigismunda". (Note: Lutyens went on to design Busbridge War Memorial and several memorials to the Jekyll family in the same churchyard.)

From 1915, the British government prohibited the repatriation of the bodies of men killed overseas, meaning that most bereaved families did not have a nearby grave to visit and thus war memorials became a focal point for their grief. Cenotaphs originated in Ancient Greek tradition, where they were built when it was impossible to recover a body after the battle, as the Greeks placed great cultural importance on the proper burial of their war dead. Lutyens remembered the term when working on Southampton's memorial in early 1919. He broke with the Ancient Greek convention in that his designs for London's and Southampton's cenotaphs contained no explicit reference to battle. The result at Southampton (unveiled a week before London's permanent Cenotaph) lacks the subtlety of London's monument, but introduces several design elements common in Lutyens's subsequent memorials.

== Origins: the temporary Cenotaph ==
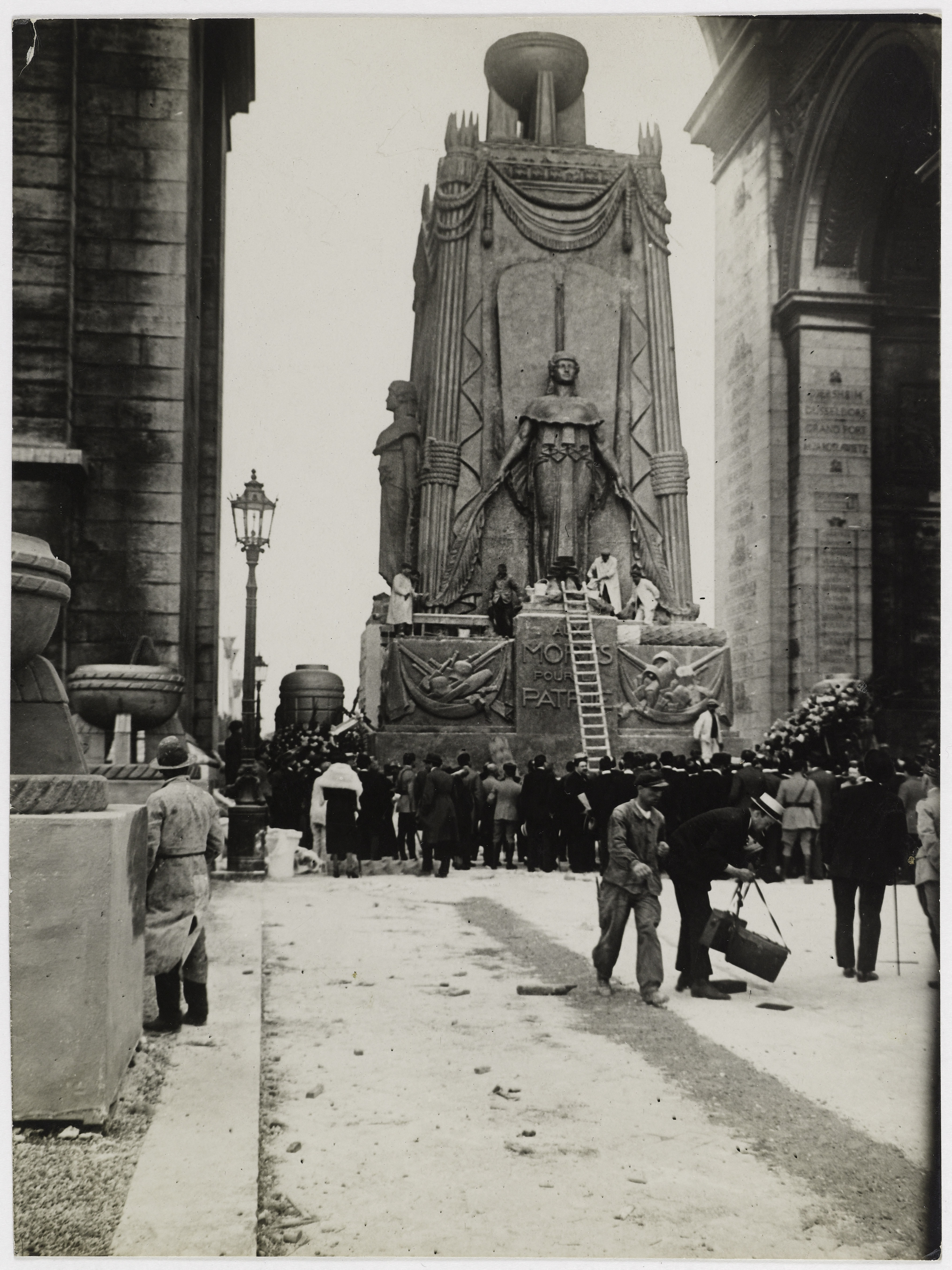
The temporary monument by Antoine Sartorio at the Arc de Triomphe for the 1919 Bastille Day military parade, the origin of Lloyd George's concept.

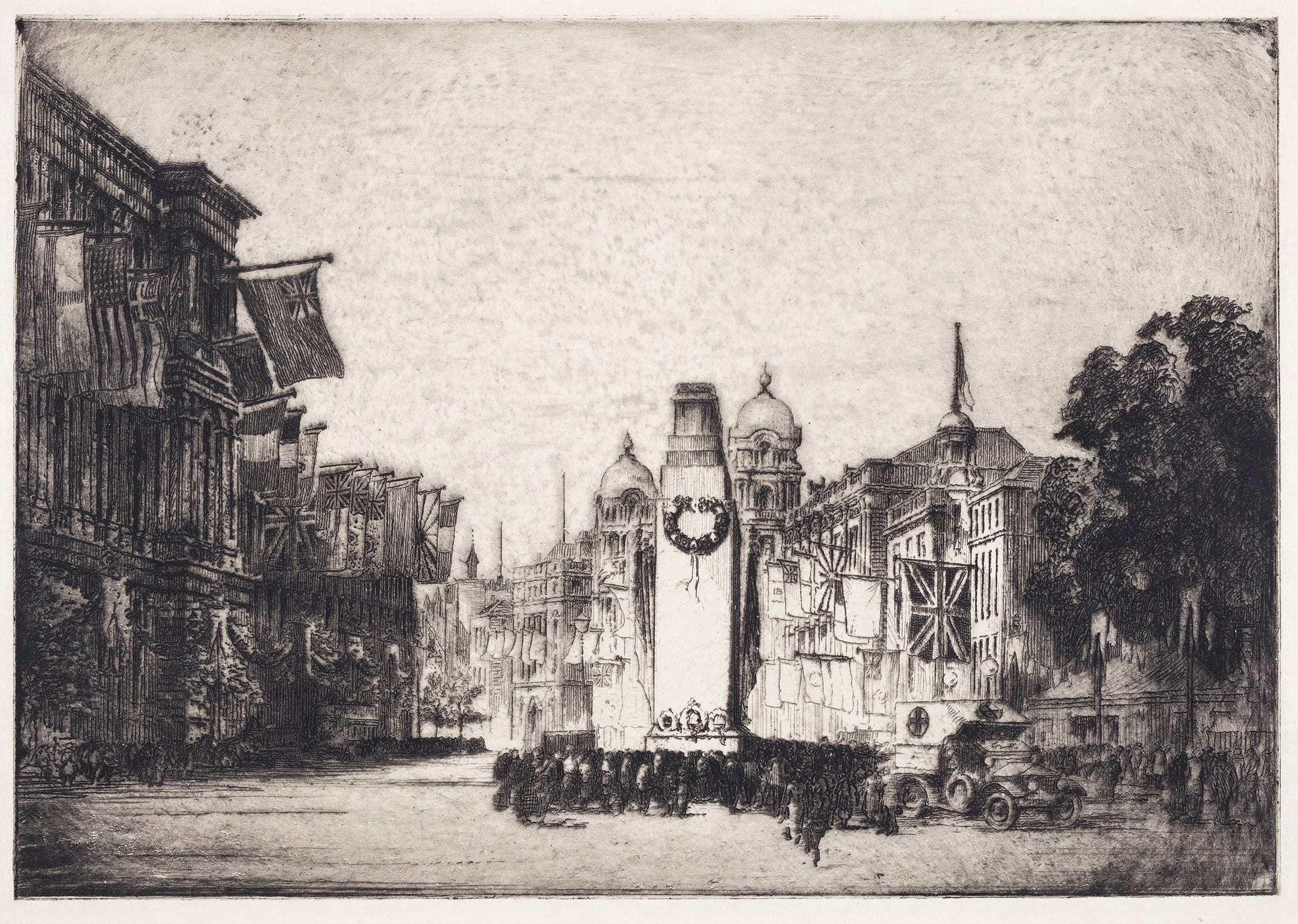
The temporary Cenotaph, in an etching by William Monk, published in 1920

The First World War ended with the Armistice of 11 November 1918, although it was not officially declared over until the signing of the Treaty of Versailles on 28 June 1919. The British government planned to hold a victory parade in London on Peace Day, 19 July, including soldiers marching to Whitehall, the centre of the British government. The initial design for what would become the Cenotaph was one of a number of temporary structures erected along the parade's route. The prime minister, David Lloyd George, learnt that the French plans for a similar parade in Paris included a saluting point for the marching troops and was keen to replicate the idea for the British parade. How Lutyens became involved is unclear, but he was close friends with Sir Alfred Mond and Sir Lionel Earle (respectively the government minister and senior civil servant at the Office of Works, which was responsible for public building projects) and it seems likely that one or both men discussed the idea with Lutyens. Lloyd George summoned Lutyens (Note: The exact date of the meeting between Lutyens and Lloyd George was not recorded. Lutyens's biographer, Christopher Hussey, puts it at 19 July, which cannot be correct as this was the date of the parade—by which time the temporary Cenotaph had already been built. The architectural historian Allan Greenberg and Tim Skelton, author of Lutyens and the Great War, both speculated that the meeting must have taken place in early July.) and asked him to design a "catafalque" as the centre point for the parade. Lloyd George emphasised that the structure was to be non-denominational. Lutyens met with Sir Frank Baines, chief architect at the Office of Works, the same day to sketch his idea for the Cenotaph and sketched it again for his friend Lady Sackville over dinner that night. Both sketches show the Cenotaph almost as-built.

At the end of the war, there was considerable social upheaval and civil unrest in Britain and Ireland, and industrial relations were tense. The government, fearful that revolutionary ideologies such as Bolshevism might start to take hold, hoped the parade and a central saluting point would unite the nation in celebrating the victorious conclusion to the war and commemorating the sacrifice of the dead.

Although Lutyens apparently produced the design very quickly, he had had the concept in mind for some time, as evidenced by his design for Southampton Cenotaph and his work for the IWGC. Lutyens and Mond had previously worked together on a design for a war shrine in Hyde Park, intended to replace a temporary structure erected during the war. Though the shrine was never built, the design started Lutyens thinking about commemorative architecture, and the architectural historian Allan Greenberg speculates that Mond may have discussed the concept of a memorial with Lutyens prior to the meeting with the prime minister. According to Tim Skelton, author of Lutyens and the Great War, "If it was not to be on Whitehall then the Cenotaph as we know it would have appeared somewhere else in due course." Several of Lutyens's sketches survive, which show that he experimented with multiple minor changes to the design, including a flaming urn at the top of the Cenotaph and sculptures of soldiers or lions at the base (similar to the lion heads on Southampton Cenotaph). (Note: Lutyens and his wife were prolific letter writers. On 7 July 1919 he wrote to Lady Emily: "Curzon wants it less catafalque so I am putting a great urn on it.")

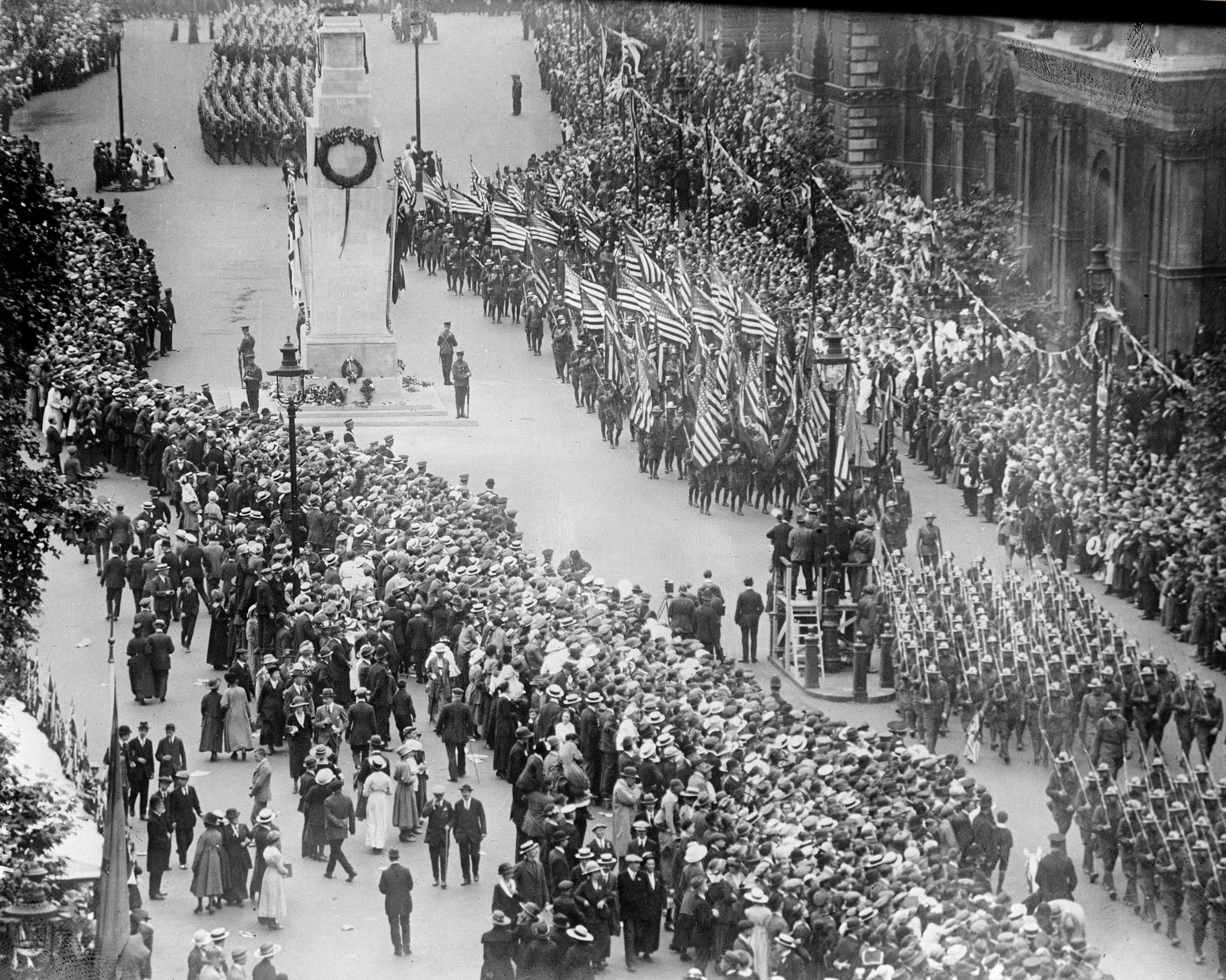
Victory Parade of 19 July 1919: American troops march past the original Cenotaph.

Lutyens submitted his final design to the Office of Works in early July, and on 7 July received confirmation that the design had been approved by the foreign secretary, Lord Curzon, who was organising the parade. The unveiling of the monument, built in wood and plaster by the Office of Works, was described in The Times as a quiet and unofficial ceremony. It took place on 18 July 1919, the day before the Victory Parade. Lutyens was not invited. During the parade, 15,000 soldiers and 1,500 officers marched past and saluted the Cenotaph—among them were American General John J. Pershing and French Marshal Ferdinand Foch, as well as the British commanders Field Marshal Sir Douglas Haig and Admiral of the Fleet Sir David Beatty. The Cenotaph quickly captured the public imagination. Repatriation of the dead had been forbidden since the early days of the war, so the Cenotaph came to represent the absent dead and serve as a substitute for a tomb. Beginning almost immediately after the Victory Parade and continuing for days afterwards, members of the public began laying flowers and wreaths around the memorial. Within a week, an estimated 1.2 million people came to the Cenotaph to pay their respects to the dead, and the base was covered in flowers and other tributes. According to The Times, "no feature of the victory march in London made a deeper impression than the Cenotaph."

After the Victory Parade, the temporary Cenotaph became a point of pilgrimage for many people, including grieving relatives. Deputations arrived from as far away as Dundee, and schools organised excursions to take children to see it. The crowds were particularly large on 11 November 1919, the first anniversary of the armistice. An estimated 6,000 people were crowded round the memorial and it took the intervention of the police to create space for Lloyd George to lay a wreath. The French president, Raymond Poincaré, also laid a wreath; King George V and Queen Mary sent a wreath but were not present at the Cenotaph. A two-minute silence was observed, after which veterans' groups marched past. The government, caught by surprise by the strength of feeling, resolved to lay on an organised event for 1920.

== Reconstruction in stone ==
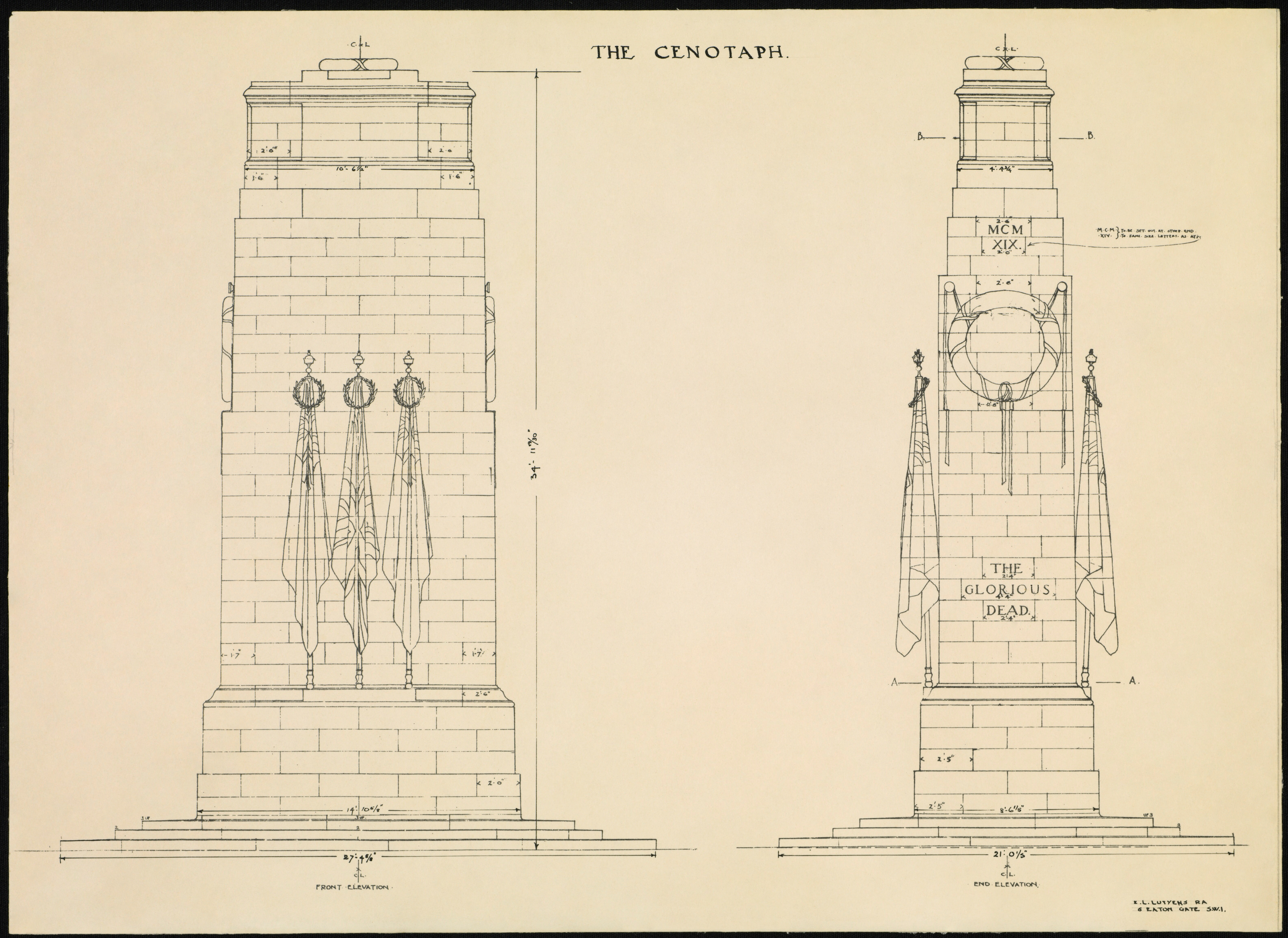
One of Lutyens's designs for the Cenotaph, in the collection of the Imperial War Museum

Suggestions that the temporary cenotaph should be re-built as a permanent structure began almost immediately, coming from members of the public and national newspapers. Four days after the parade, William Ormsby-Gore, Member of Parliament for Stafford—an army officer who fought in the war and was part of the British delegation at Versailles—questioned Mond about the Cenotaph in the House of Commons, and asked whether a permanent replacement was planned. Ormsby-Gore was supported by multiple other members. Mond announced that the decision rested with the cabinet, but promised to pass on the support of the House. The following week, The Times published an editorial calling for a permanent replacement (though the writer suggested that there was a risk of vehicles crashing into the Cenotaph in its original location and that it be built on nearby Horse Guards Parade); many letters to London and national newspapers followed. The cabinet sought Lutyens's opinion, which was that the original site had been "qualified by the salutes of Foch and the allied armies [and] no other site would give this pertinence." Mond agreed, telling the cabinet that "no other site would have the same historical or sentimental association." The cabinet bowed to public pressure, approving the re-building in stone, and in the original location, at its meeting on 30 July 1919.

Concerns remained about the Cenotaph's location. Another editorial in The Times suggested siting it in Parliament Square, away from traffic, a location that was supported by the local authorities. The issue was again raised in the House of Commons, and Ormsby-Gore led the calls for the Cenotaph to be rebuilt on its original spot, stating, to acclaim, that he was certain that this option was the most popular with the public. Opposition to the site eventually quietened and the construction contract was awarded to Holland, Hannen & Cubitts. Construction began in May 1920.

Lutyens waived his fee, and Mond gave Lutyens the opportunity to make any amendments to the design before work began. The architect submitted his proposed modifications on 1 November, which were approved the same day. He replaced the real laurel wreaths with stone sculptures and added entasis—subtle curvature, reminiscent of the Parthenon, so that the vertical surfaces taper inwards and the horizontals form arcs of a circle. He wrote to Mond:

I have made slight alterations to meet the conditions demanded by the setting out of its lines on subtle curvatures, the difference is almost imperceptible but sufficient to give it a sculpturesque quality and a life, that cannot pertain to rectangular blocks of stone.

Lutyens had earlier used entasis for his Stone of Remembrance, which appears in most large IWGC cemeteries. Some religious groups objected to the lack of Christian symbolism on the Cenotaph and suggested the inclusion of a cross or a more overtly Christian inscription. Lutyens objected to the proposal, and it was rejected by the government on the grounds that the Cenotaph was for people "from all parts of the empire, irrespective of their religious creeds". The only other significant alteration Lutyens proposed was the replacement of the silk flags on the temporary Cenotaph with painted stone, fearing that the fabric would quickly become worn and look untidy. He was supported on this by Mond and engaged the sculptor Francis Derwent Wood for assistance, but the change was rejected by the cabinet. A diary entry by Lady Sackville from August 1920 records Lutyens complaining bitterly about the change, though documents in The National Archives suggest that he had been aware of it six months previously.

The temporary Cenotaph, originally intended to remain in place only a week, was dismantled in January 1920, its condition having deteriorated severely. The work was carried out behind a screen to shield the partially dismantled monument from public view. The top section, along with the flags, was preserved for the fledgling Imperial War Museum (founded in 1917), as part of its exhibition on the war. The acquisition was the idea of Charles ffoulkes, the museum's inaugural curator. It was displayed prominently, and was used for the museum's own remembrance services in the interwar period until it was destroyed by a bomb during the Second World War. The Imperial War Museum collections also include a wooden money-collection box in the shape of the Cenotaph, made from part of the temporary Cenotaph by St Dunstan's.

== Design ==
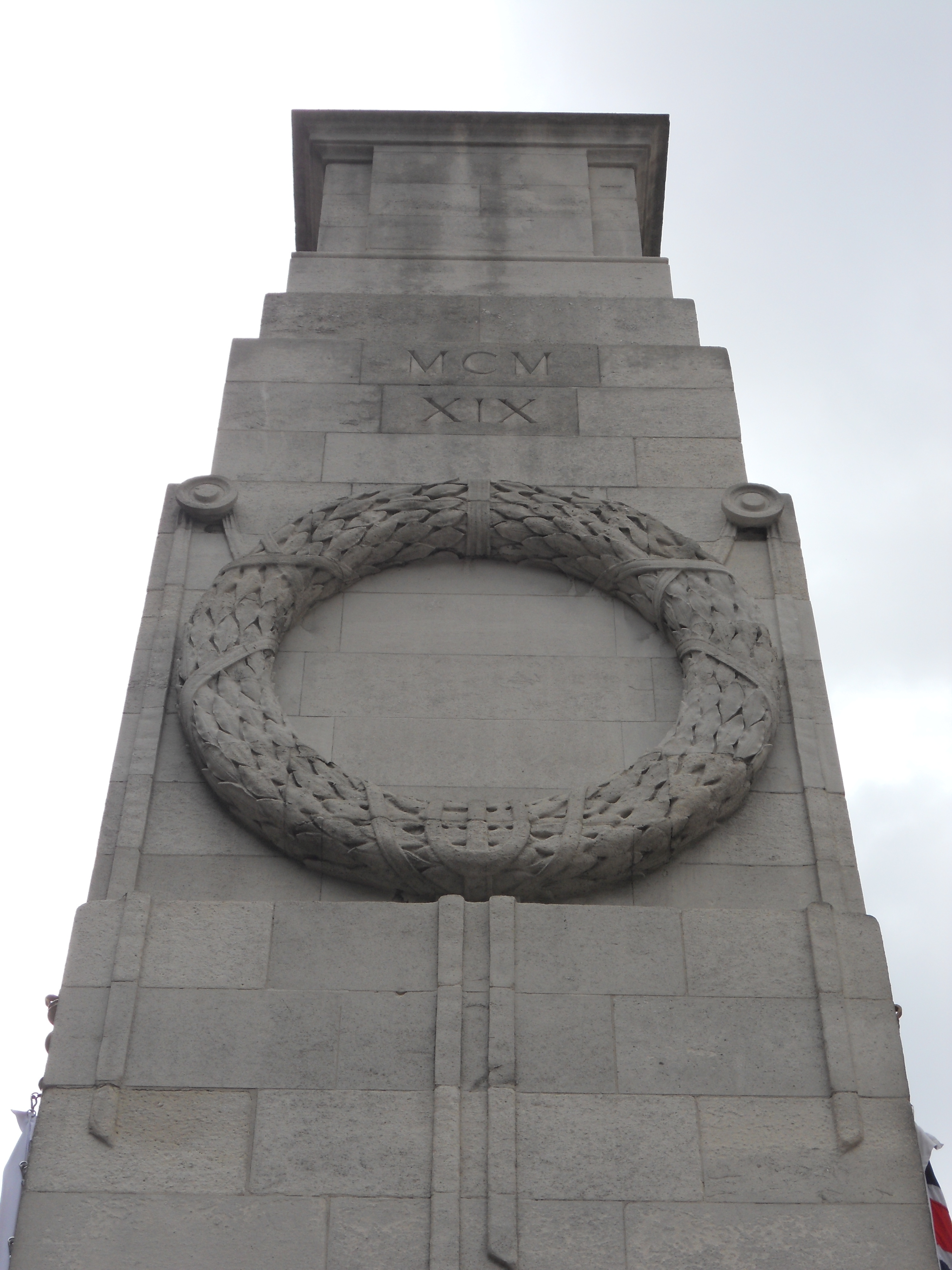
The laurel wreath on one face of the Cenotaph

The Cenotaph is made from Portland stone formed as a pylon on a rectangular plan (two long sides and two short ones), with gradually diminishing tiers, culminating in a sculpted tomb chest (the empty tomb suggested by the name cenotaph) on which is carved laurel wreath. The structure rises to a height of just over 35 feet (11 metres) and is about 15 by 9 feet (4.5 by 2.7 metres) at the base. Lutyens described it as "an empty tomb uplifted on a high pedestal".

The pylon's mass decreases with its height; the sides becoming narrower towards the bottom of the coffin. The base is in four stages from the top of the steps starting with the plinth, which connects to the base block. The plinth projects 3 inches (7.6 centimetres) from the base block on all four sides. Above it is the transition moulding which is in three stages—torus (semi-circular), cyma reversa, and cavetto—taking the lower part of the structure just over 6 feet (1.8 metres) above the ground. Greenberg describes this section as "quietly establish[ing] the memorial's overall character: an outward appearance of simple repose which, on close observation, shows itself to be dependent on the more complex forms of its masses".

At the top, the coffin is connected to the main structure by its own base of two steps, the transition smoothed by a torus moulding between the bottom step and the pylon. The coffin lid finishes with a cornice, appearing to be supported by an ovolo (a curved decorative moulding beneath the edge), which casts a shadow over the coffin; it is crowned by a laurel wreath. The bottom of the structure is mounted onto three diminishing steps on an island in the centre of Whitehall surrounded by government buildings. The monument is austere, containing very little decoration. At each end, on the second tier below the tomb, is a laurel wreath, echoing the one at the top, and on the sides is the inscription "THE GLORIOUS DEAD". The only other inscription is the dates of the world wars in Roman numerals—the first on the ends, above the wreath, and the second on the sides. The sculptural work was carried out by Derwent Wood.

None of the lines on the pylon are straight. The sides are not parallel but are subtly curved using precise geometry so as to be barely visible to the naked eye (entasis). If extended, the apparently vertical surfaces would meet 1,000 feet (300 m) above the ground and the apparently horizontal surfaces are sections of a sphere whose centre would be 900 feet (270 m) below ground. (Note: Lutyens later stated that his calculations for the entasis filled 33 pages of a manuscript book.) The use of curvature and diminishing tiers is intended to draw the eye upwards in a spiralling direction, first to the inscription, then to the top of the flags, to the wreath, and finally to the coffin at the top. Many of these elements were not present in Lutyens's early design, and the progression can be seen in several of the architect's sketches. In his sketch for Lady Sackville, he omitted most of the setbacks, and had the wreaths on the sides hanging from pegs. In another drawing he included an urn on top of the coffin and sculptures of lions flanking the base (similar to the pine cones on Southampton Cenotaph). Other experimental designs omit the flags, and one included a recumbent effigy atop the coffin (in place of an urn). (Note: Recumbent effigies later featured on several of Lutyens's memorials including Southampton Cenotaph, Rochdale Cenotaph, and the Midland Railway War Memorial in Derby.) A wooden model from an early stage in the design process is in the collection of the Imperial War Museum, as are several of Lutyens's original drawings; others are in the Royal Institute of British Architects' drawing library.

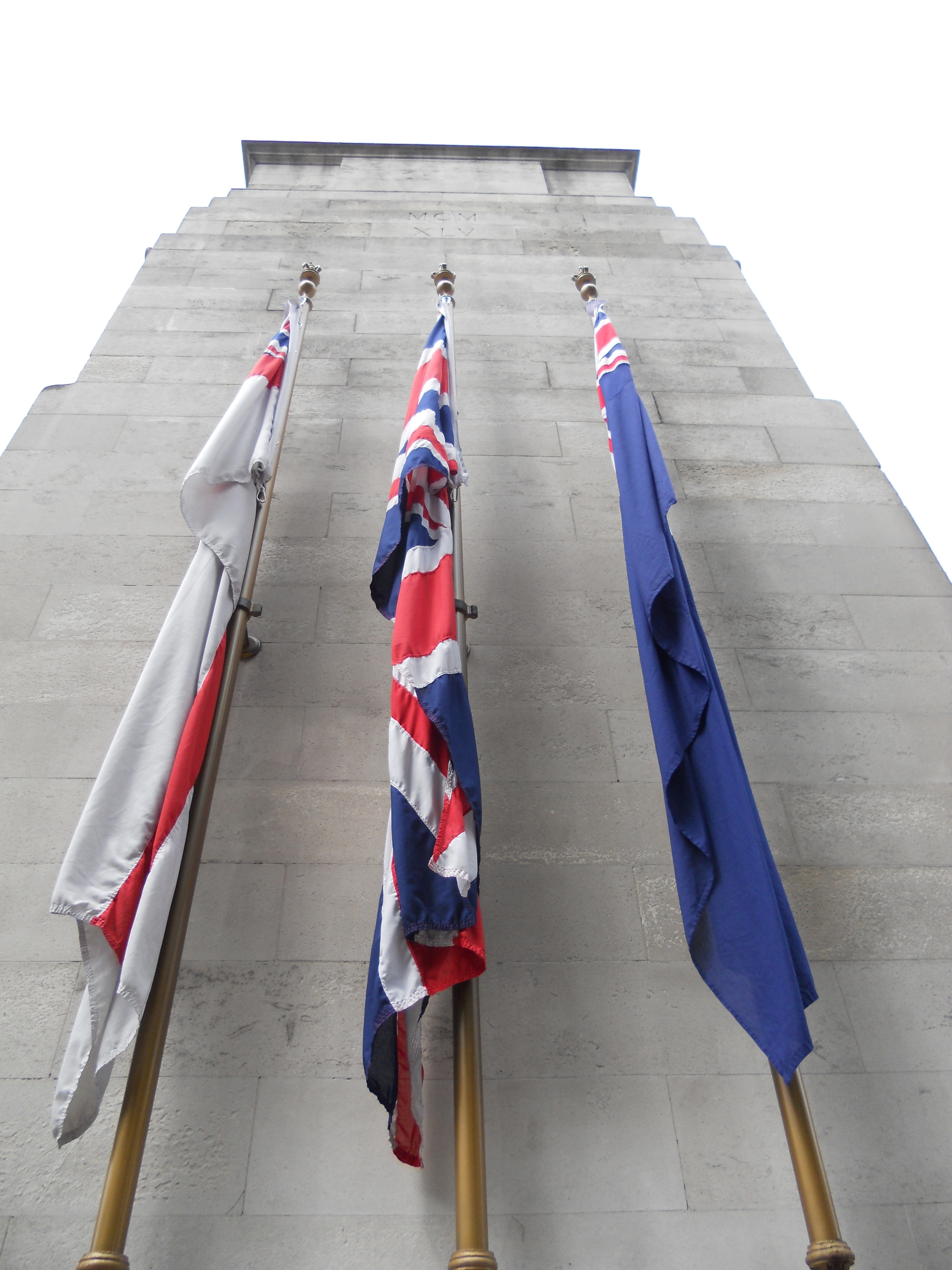
The White Ensign, Union Flag, and Blue Ensign on the Cenotaph

The Cenotaph is flanked on the long sides by flags of the United Kingdom—the Royal Air Force Ensign, Union Flag, and Red Ensign on one side, and the Blue Ensign, Union Flag, and White Ensign on the other. Lutyens intended the flags to be carved in stone like the rest of the monument. He was overruled and cloth flags were used, though Lutyens went on to use stone flags on several of his other war memorials, painted on Rochdale Cenotaph and Northampton War Memorial (among others), and unpainted at Étaples and Villers-Bretonneux IWGC cemeteries.

== Appreciation ==
On the day of its unveiling, The Times praised the Cenotaph as "simple, massive, unadorned". Catherine Moriarty, of the Imperial War Museum's National Inventory of War Memorials project, observed in 1995 that the Cenotaph met with widespread public acclaim, and that the public adopted the unfamiliar name with enthusiasm. She described an empty tomb as a highly appropriate monument for the experience of the British public, considering that the vast majority of the British dead were buried overseas. Nonetheless, Moriarty believed that the Cenotaph, "... although popular, was too abstract in form and generalised in its commemorative allusion to fully satisfy the need for a focus of grief." This, Moriarty felt, was the reason that many local memorials, including some by Lutyens, adopted some form of figurative sculpture, such as a statue of a soldier.

According to the historian Alex King, the Cenotaph fitted the convention of a shrine, such as the temporary memorials to the dead established across London during the war, including the Hyde Park shrine. King believed that the public response, particularly the laying of flowers, treated the Cenotaph as a shrine—a place for paying respects to the dead. Nonetheless, the austerity and apparent simplicity of the Cenotaph leaves its meaning open to a wide variety of interpretations, not all of which have been in keeping with Lutyens's intentions. Some ascribed imperialistic or nationalistic meanings to the monument, including Haig, who called it "a symbol of the empire's unity". The Catholic Herald called it a "pagan monument" and felt that it was insulting to Christianity, and other traditional Christian groups were displeased by the lack of religious symbolism. Lutyens was a pantheist, heavily influenced by his wife's involvement with Theosophy. He opposed overt religious symbolism on the Cenotaph and in his work with the IWGC, a position which did not endear him to the church.

Roderick Gradidge, an architect and author of a biography of Lutyens, commented on Lutyens's use of geometry—"He [Lutyens] recognised that in this careful proportioning system he had hit on something that people could recognise though never understand; a sort of music of the spheres which expressed what they felt about the horrifying destruction [...] both of human life and the shape of society itself."

The American historian Jay Winter described the Cenotaph as displaying a "striking minimalism". According to Winter, the Cenotaph "managed to transform a victory parade [...] into a time when millions could contemplate the [...] inexorable reality of death in war," and was "a work of genius because of its simplicity. It says so much because it says nothing at all. It is a form on which anyone could inscribe his or her own thoughts, reveries, sadness." He believed that, in designing an empty tomb, "the tomb of no one [...] became the tomb of all who had died in the war." He compared it favourably to another of Lutyens's major commemorative works, the Thiepval Memorial, built for the IWGC in France, and to Maya Lin's Vietnam Veterans Memorial in Washington, DC. Jenny Edkins, a British political scientist, also draws a parallel between the Cenotaph and the Vietnam Memorial and the unexpected public acclaim that both received immediately after their unveiling. Edkins believed that the apparent simplicity of, and lack of decoration on, the two memorials provided for a "collective act of mourning". Another architect, Andrew Crompton, of the University of Liverpool, re-evaluated the Cenotaph at the turn of the 21st century. He compared the diminishing tiers (when viewed from the ground up) to the hilt of a sheathed sword, its blade buried beneath the ground, which he felt resembled the mythical sword Excalibur.

The Cenotaph has been contrasted with the Royal Artillery Memorial by Charles Sargeant Jagger. Lutyens submitted a proposed design for that memorial, but the Royal Artillery rejected it on the grounds that it was too similar to the Cenotaph, and that they wanted a more realist monument, rather than Lutyens's abstract classicism. Whereas Lutyens placed the empty coffin high above the ground, distancing the observer from it, Jagger sculpted a dead soldier and placed it at eye level, confronting the observer with the reality of war. The Tomb of the Unknown Warrior in Westminster Abbey, inaugurated on the same day as the Cenotaph and another of London's most famous war memorials, has also been contrasted with the Cenotaph. Edkins observes that the Tomb was intended to "provide a grave for those who had none" and to become a focal point for the mourning of those buried overseas, but that the Cenotaph became much more popular as a site for both individual commemoration and public ceremonies.

The German-American historian George Mosse noted that most countries involved in the First World War eventually adopted the concept of burying an unidentified soldier, but in London the Cenotaph fulfilled the same purpose, despite the tomb in the abbey. Unlike elsewhere, it was the Cenotaph and not an unknown warrior that became the centre of national ceremonies, which Mosse considered was because the abbey was "too cluttered with memorials and tombs of famous Englishmen to provide the appropriate place for pilgrimages or celebrations" compared to the Cenotaph's location in the middle of a broad avenue. Ken Inglis, an Australian historian, and Gavin Stamp, a British architectural historian, both suggested that the Unknown Warrior was the Church of England's attempt to create a rival to the Cenotaph, which had no explicitly Christian symbolism, though another historian, David Lloyd, suggests that this was largely unsuccessful—the Church even petitioned for its own ceremonies to be the focus of attention on Armistice Day 1923, rather than those at the Cenotaph, but the proposal was rejected after it met with widespread public opposition. Instead, Lloyd noted that the two monuments became closely linked, and that "Together, the memorials reflect the complexity and ambiguity of the British response to the Great War".

== Unveiling ==
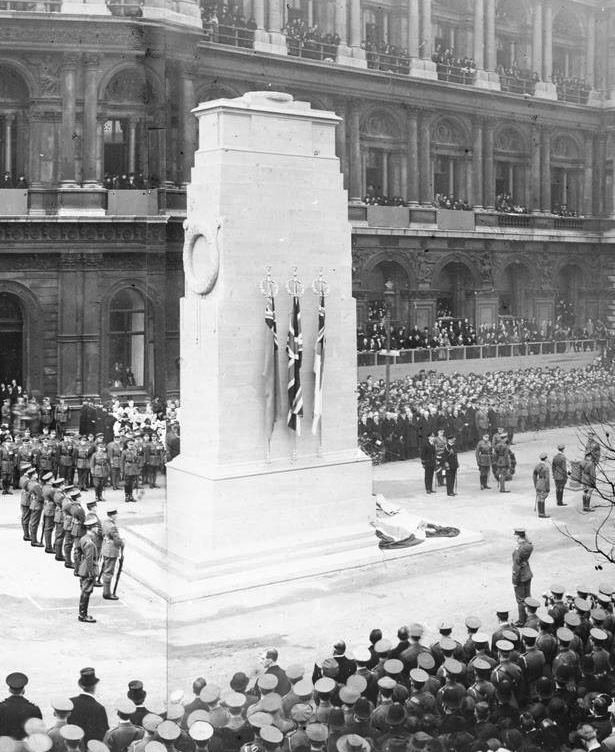
The unveiling ceremony on 11 November 1920

No date was announced for the completion of the Cenotaph at first, but the British government was keen to have it in place for Remembrance Day (11 November). In September 1920, the announcement came that the Cenotaph would be unveiled on 11 November, the second anniversary of the armistice, and that the unveiling would be performed by King George V. For the occasion, the government designated the Cenotaph the official memorial to all British and empire dead lost during the First World War. It subsequently became the official memorial to British casualties from later conflicts.

Late into the planning, the government decided to exhume an unidentified serviceman—thenceforth to be known as the Unknown Warrior—from a grave in France, and inter him in Westminster Abbey. The last leg of the Unknown Warrior's journey to the abbey took place in coordination with events at the Cenotaph. The king was to unveil the Cenotaph, this time with Lutyens in attendance, along with other members of the royal family, the prime minister, and Randall Davidson, the Archbishop of Canterbury (the Church of England's most senior cleric). The Unknown Warrior was brought to Whitehall, his coffin resting on a gun carriage pulled by military horses, for the unveiling. The Cenotaph was shrouded in Union Flags until the king performed the unveiling at the stroke of 11 o'clock. This ceremonial act was followed by two minutes' silence, ending with the sounding of the "Last Post". The king placed a wreath of roses on the Unknown Warrior's coffin, and the cortege continued its journey—His Majesty, the other royals, Lloyd George, and the archbishop following the gun carriage to the abbey.

The public response exceeded even that to the temporary Cenotaph in the aftermath of the armistice. Whitehall was closed to traffic for several days after the ceremony and wounded soldiers, other veterans, and members of the public began to file past the Cenotaph and lay flowers at its base. The volume of people wishing to lay tributes was such that there were delays of up to four hours to pass the Cenotaph; the procession continued through the night and into the next day. Within a week, the Cenotaph was 10 feet (3 metres) deep in flowers and an estimated 1.25 million people had visited it so far, while 500,000 had visited the Tomb of the Unknown Warrior. Lloyd George wrote to Lutyens, "The Cenotaph is the token of our mourning as a nation; the Grave of the Unknown Warrior is the token of our mourning as individuals."

== Later history ==
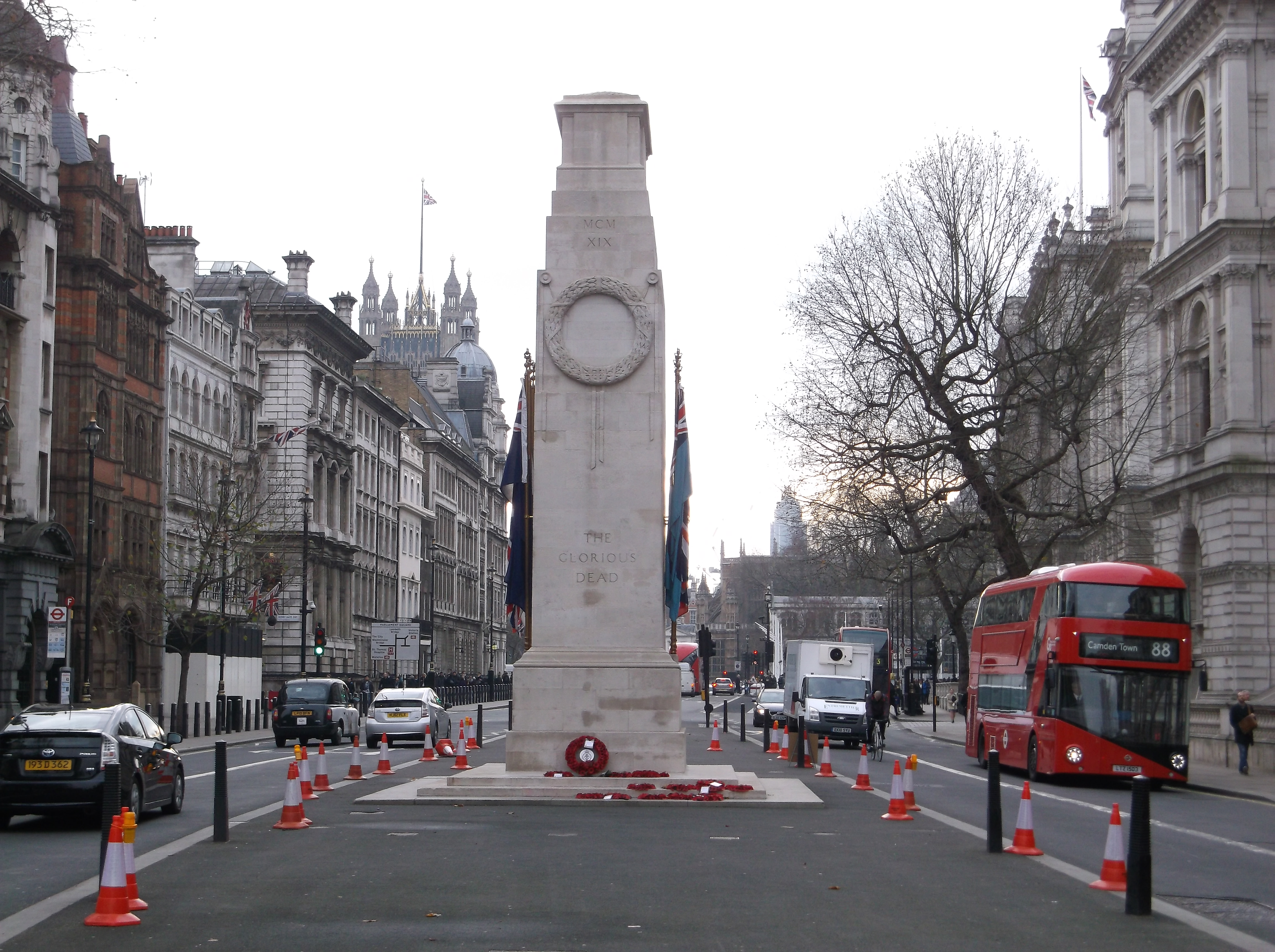
The Cenotaph (pictured in 2015) with the buildings of Whitehall in the background

Throughout the 1920s and 1930s, it was customary for men to doff their hats when passing the Cenotaph, even on a bus. The pilgrimage which began with the Cenotaph's unveiling continued on a smaller scale for the rest of the 1920s and into the 1930s. Pilgrimages continued until the outbreak of the Second World War. A particularly large crowd gathered on 11 November 1946, the year after that war ended, but attendance largely fell away thereafter. In the later 1920s, several proposals emerged for modifications to the Cenotaph, including the addition of life-size bronze statues at its corners, and installing a light inside the wreath at the top to emit a vertical beam, but all were rejected by the Office of Works on Lutyens's advice. The statues in particular would have added a literal element to the memorial which Greenberg (writing in 1989) believed would have been at odds with its "open symbolism and abstract character".

After the unveiling of the permanent memorial, members of the public continued to lay floral tributes as well as hand-written messages and personal memorials such as photographs, wreaths, and glass domes. The Office of Works struggled to decide what to do with the tributes and how to maintain an appropriate tone. It began preserving the messages so that they could be compiled into albums and given to the Imperial War Museum. By March 1921, officials had catalogued more than 30,000 items; the volume was such that they were forced to abandon their efforts at preservation. The office was keen to avoid being seen as a censor but also to preserve the character of the Cenotaph; officials thus removed some tributes which contained overtly political messages. In 1933, Alfred Rosenberg, representing Nazi Germany, controversially laid a wreath at the Cenotaph. The accompanying card was removed overnight and the swastika on the wreath was scratched off. The following day, Captain James Sears, a First World War veteran and prospective Labour Party parliamentary candidate, removed the entire wreath and threw it in the river. He described his actions as "a deliberate protest against the desecration of our national war memorial" and against the views of the Nazi Party, which he believed were the same as those Britain had fought against. Sears was arrested, charged with malicious damage, and fined. Some newspaper columnists and letter writers sympathised with Sears's actions, though others felt that his actions themselves desecrated the Cenotaph by using it to make a political statement.

Following the Second World War, the Cenotaph was rededicated to include the British and empire dead from that war, and its dates in Roman numerals (MCMXXXIX and MCMXLV) were added to the inscription. King George VI unveiled the additions at a ceremony on 10 November 1946. No separate national memorial was built for the casualties of the second war; instead, remembrance services were expanded to commemorate the new dead, and veterans of that war and later conflicts joined an annual march-past.

Several political protests have taken place in the vicinity of the Cenotaph. In 2000, anti-capitalist protesters spray-painted slogans on it and on a statue of Winston Churchill. In a 2010 student protest, a man climbed the base and swung from one of the flags. In June 2020, the base was vandalised with spray paint during Black Lives Matter protests, and the following day a protester attempted to set fire to one of the Union Flags on the Cenotaph. The Cenotaph and several other monuments were covered up temporarily to prevent any further vandalism, and counter-protesters (including some far-right activists) congregated around it a few days later. On 11 November 2020, the environmental group Extinction Rebellion held a protest at the Cenotaph at a time when no official ceremony could take place due to COVID-19 restrictions; the protest was condemned by politicians and the Royal British Legion. A group of football supporters and far-right protesters clashed with police at the Cenotaph on Armistice Day 2023, the day before Remembrance Sunday commemorations, claiming to defend the Cenotaph in response to a pro-Palestinian march through London the same day which was itself a response to the Gaza war.

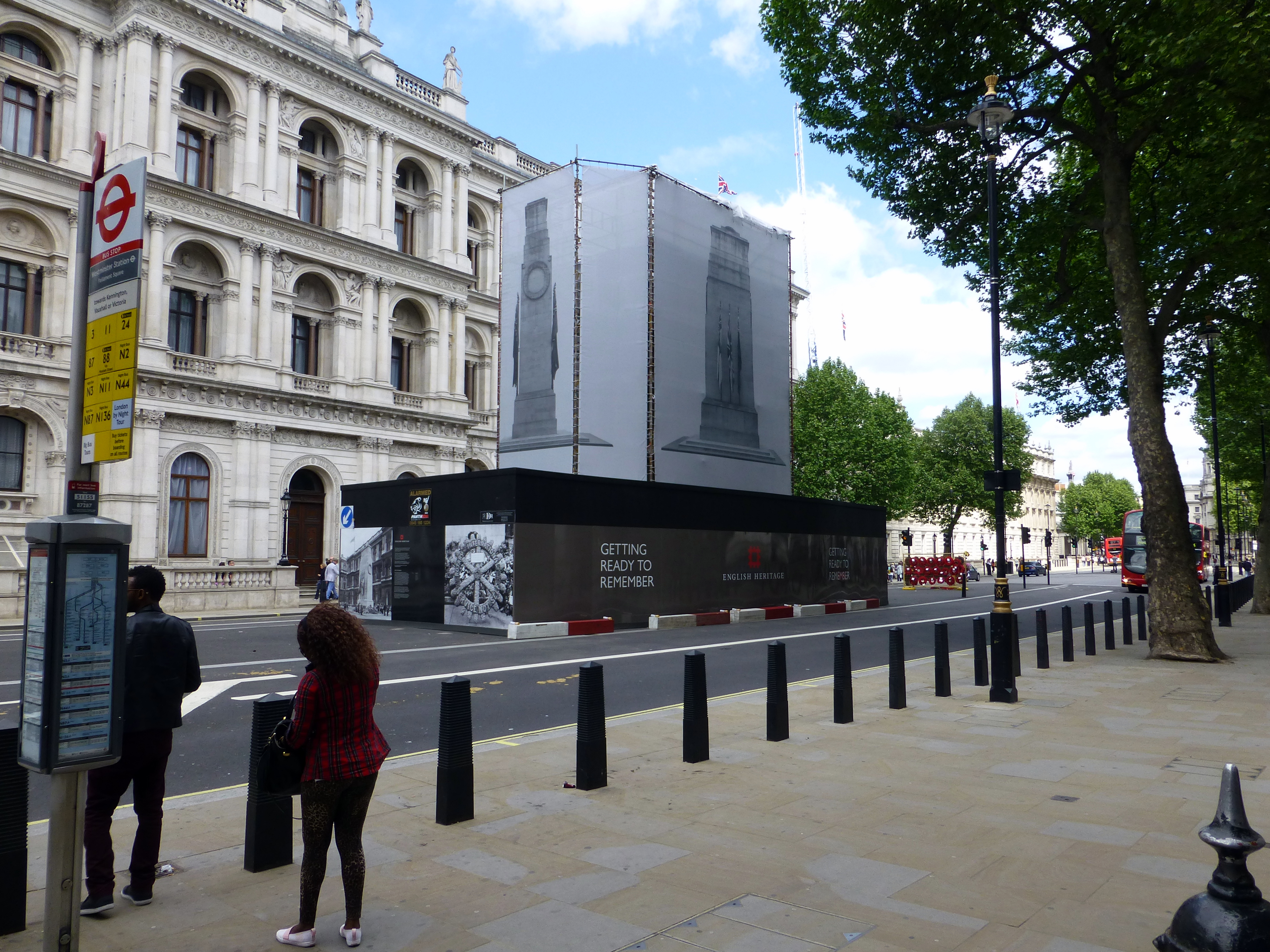
The Cenotaph concealed by screens during the 2013 restoration.

In 2013, just before the centenary of the First World War, English Heritage carried out £60,000 of restoration work on the Cenotaph. Contractors cleaned the stonework using steam and a poultice to remove dirt and algae and counter the effects of weathering and pollution. Somewhat controversially, the German president, Frank-Walter Steinmeier, was invited to lay a wreath at the Cenotaph on Remembrance Sunday 2018 to mark the centenary of the armistice, the first time a German representative had been present at the commemorations.

The funeral of Queen Elizabeth II on 19 September 2022 included a procession through Central London. Military personnel, including members of the royal family who were in uniform, saluted the Cenotaph as the procession passed. King Charles III led commemorations on Remembrance Sunday 2022 for the first time as monarch, though he had represented his mother at the Cenotaph since 2017 because of her growing frailty.

=== Remembrance services ===
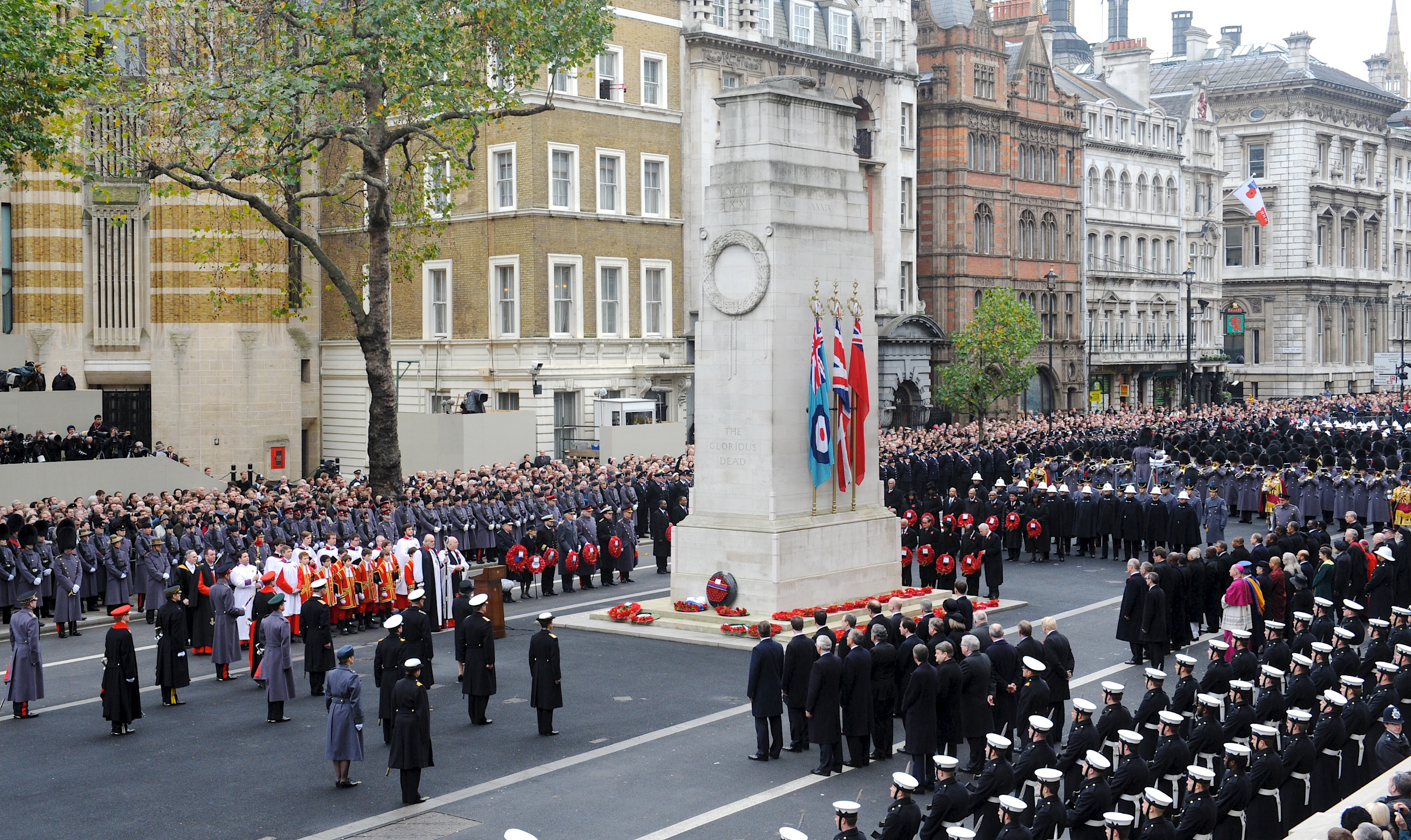
Wreaths being laid at the Cenotaph during the Remembrance Sunday service in 2010

The Cenotaph is the focal point for the National Service of Remembrance held annually on Remembrance Sunday, the Second Sunday in November. In the Cenotaph's early years, the service was informal and crowds gathered round the memorial to pay their respects and lay tributes, but the ceremony gradually became more formal, and has changed little since the 1930s. Whitehall is closed to vehicle traffic and a two-minute silence is observed at 11:00 am. After the silence, the crowd sings traditional hymns, accompanied by military musicians. The monarch and the prime minister (or their representatives) then lay wreaths at the Cenotaph, followed by other members of the royal family, politicians, and Commonwealth high commissioners. Afterwards, serving military personnel, veterans' associations, and other organisations march past and lay their own wreaths. Until the Second World War, the service was held on 11 November. It was moved to a Sunday to avoid interrupting wartime production, and has been held on a Sunday ever since. According to Paul Fussell, an American literary historian specialising in the cultural effects of the world wars, "to sense the British obsession with the Great War, all that is necessary is to stand at the Cenotaph [...] on any Remembrance Sunday and listen to the two minutes of silence", which he describes as "appropriately shocking in the context of the customary hum of traffic."

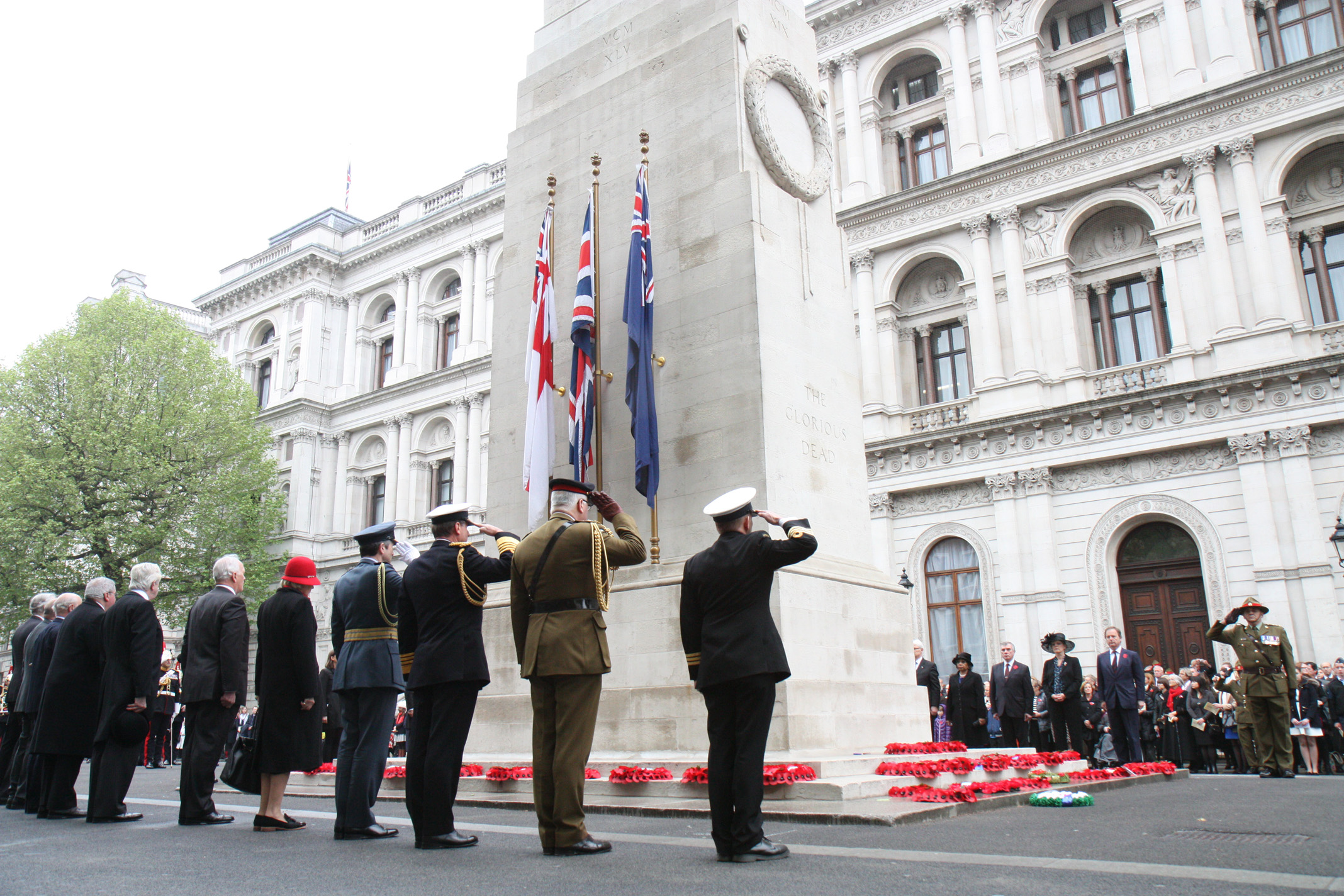
Anzac Day at the Cenotaph, on 25 April 2014.

Other annual ceremonies are also held at the Cenotaph, such as commemorations by individual regiments, veterans' associations, the commemoration service organised by the Western Front Association, the Belgian Cenotaph Parade, the Association of Jewish Ex-Servicemen and Women or anniversaries such as Anzac Day (25 April). In 2000, relatives of soldiers executed for desertion or cowardice during the First World War joined the Remembrance Sunday parade for the first time, and in 2014 a representative of the Irish government laid a wreath on Remembrance Sunday for the first time, in memory of Irishmen who fought in the British armed forces in the First World War.

The BBC began broadcasting special radio programming for Armistice Day in 1923, and began broadcasting the events at the Cenotaph live from 1928. Radio broadcasting enabled the silence to be observed simultaneously across the country, and allowed millions of listeners to feel part of the ceremony. The BBC began broadcasting television pictures of the ceremony from 1937. The broadcast has run almost continually since its inception, interrupted only for the Second World War, making it one of the longest-running annual broadcasts in the world.

=== Heritage status ===
The Cenotaph was designated a Grade I listed building on 5 February 1970. Listing provides legal protection from unauthorised demolition or modification. Grade I is the highest possible grade, reserved for buildings of "exceptional" historical or architectural interest and applied to 2.5 per cent of listings. The Cenotaph is in the care of English Heritage, which manages historic buildings for the nation. To mark the centenary of the First World War, Historic England conducted research into war memorials with the aim of listing 2,500. As part of the project, they identified 44 freestanding war memorials in England designed by Lutyens, which they declared to be a national collection. All 44 are listed buildings and had their list entries enhanced with new research; five (including Southampton) were upgraded to Grade I on Remembrance Sunday 2014, joining the Cenotaph and the Arch of Remembrance in Leicester.

== Impact ==
=== On Lutyens ===
The renowned architectural historian Nikolaus Pevsner described the Cenotaph as "the chief national war memorial". Gavin Stamp, a British architectural historian and the author of Lutyens's entry in the Oxford Dictionary of National Biography, wrote that Lutyens's work commemorating the British war dead (the Cenotaph, his work with the IWGC and his memorial commissions elsewhere) was responsible for Lutyens's elevation to the status of a national figure. A few days after the unveiling, Lloyd George wrote to Lutyens: "the Cenotaph, by its very simplicity, fittingly expresses the memory in which the people hold all those who so bravely fought and died" in the war. In 1921, Lutyens was awarded the Royal Institute of British Architects' highest award, the Royal Gold Medal, for his body of work. Presenting the medal, the institute's president, John Simpson, described the Cenotaph as "the most remarkable of all [Lutyens's] creations [...] austere yet gracious, technically perfect, it is the very expression of repressed emotion, of massive simplicity of purpose, of the qualities which mark those whom it commemorates and those who raised it."

According to Jane Brown, in her biography of the architect, Lutyens was faced with a "constant stream" of war memorial commissions from the unveiling of the temporary Cenotaph until at least 1924. He went on to design more than 130 war memorials and cemeteries, many influenced by his work on the Cenotaph. His Southampton Cenotaph was unveiled in 1920, while the permanent monument on Whitehall was still under construction. His later cenotaphs include Rochdale, Manchester, and the Midland Railway War Memorial in Derby. Lutyens also used the design for monuments in several of his cemeteries in Belgium and France for the IWGC, most famously at Étaples.

=== On art and literature ===
Examples of artworks featuring the Cenotaph include Immortal Shrine (1928) by Will Longstaff (held at the Australian War Memorial) and The Cenotaph (Morning of the Peace Procession) (1919) by Sir William Nicholson. The latter work by Nicholson sold at auction at Christie's in London in 2018 for £62,500. The Cenotaph also featured on the reverse of the 1928 Armistice Day memorial medal by Charles Doman. Examples of the Cenotaph featuring in artworks commemorating national events include the ceremonial paintings commissioned in 1920 by the government and the king from Frank Owen Salisbury to mark the unveiling of the Cenotaph, titled The Passing of the Unknown Warrior, 11 November 1920. A study for the work hangs in Buckingham Palace; the main work is in the Ministry of Defence Main Building off Whitehall.

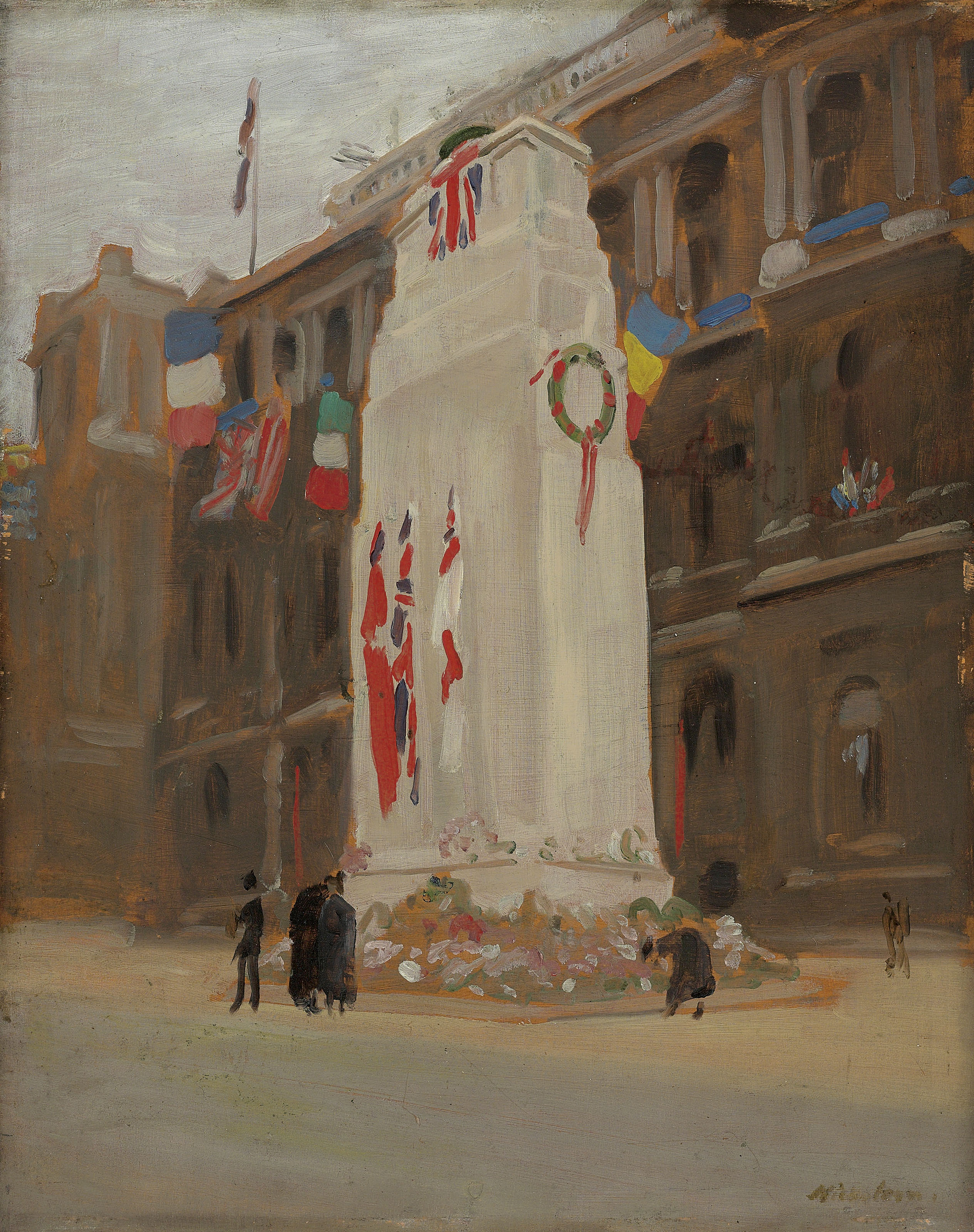
The temporary cenotaph on the morning of the Peace Procession in 1919 by Sir William Nicholson

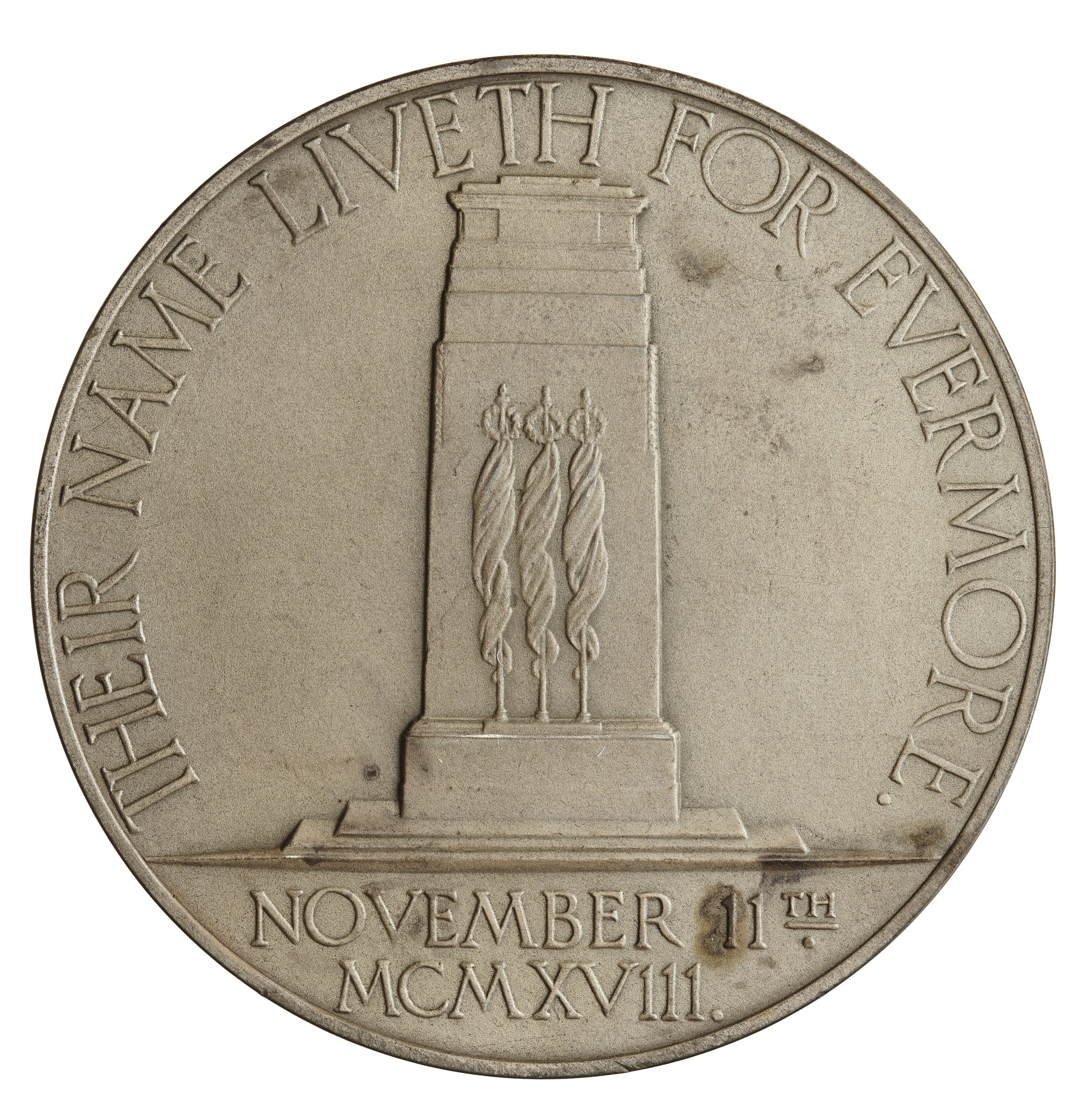
The Cenotaph featured on the reverse of the 1928 Armistice Day memorial medal by Charles Doman

A 1936 novel by Irene Rathbone with an anti-war theme, They Call it Peace, concluded with a scene set at the Cenotaph in which two women complete pilgrimages to the monument, one to honour the dead and one feeling that the deaths were in vain. The cultural response to the Cenotaph also includes poetry such as "The Cenotaph" (1919) by Charlotte Mew, "The Cenotaph in Whitehall" (1920) by Max Plowman, "The Cenotaph" (1922) by Ursula Roberts, "London Stone" (1923) by Rudyard Kipling, "At the Cenotaph" (1933) by Siegfried Sassoon, and "At the Cenotaph" (1935) by Hugh MacDiarmid. Laurence Binyon's "For the Fallen" (1914) is closely associated with the Cenotaph, having been recited at its unveiling, and commonly features in remembrance services, particularly the fourth stanza, which concludes:

At the going down of the sun, and in the morning, we will remember them.

According to the literary historian Alex Moffett, the poems about the Cenotaph convey the different narratives of the First World War and the way in which it should be remembered, in much the same way that the monument itself is open to interpretation. The poetry also expresses the conflict between sombre commemoration of the dead and celebration of victory, "a tension that many have read within the Cenotaph itself".

=== On other war memorials ===
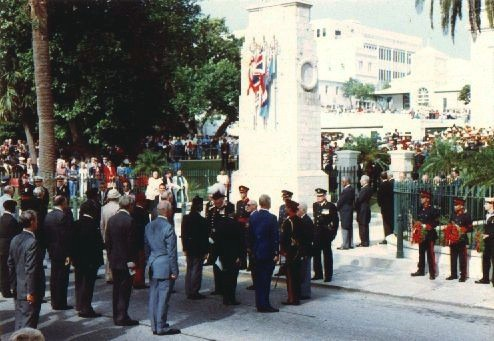
Remembrance Day parade, at the Cenotaph in Hamilton, Bermuda, 1990

According to one study of British war memorials, the Cenotaph's "deceptively simple design and deliberately non-sectarian message ensured that its form would be adopted widely, with local variations". From its unveiling, the Cenotaph proved highly influential on other war memorials in Britain. The art historian Alan Borg wrote that the Cenotaph was the "one memorial that proved to be more influential than any other". Several towns and cities erected war memorials based to some extent on Lutyens's design for Whitehall, though the term "cenotaph" came to be applied to almost any war memorial that was not itself a tomb. Lutyens designed several other cenotaphs in England and one in Wales, while replicas, of varying quality and accuracy, were built across Britain, along with many other monuments inspired to some extent by Lutyens's design. Examples include Leeds War Memorial and Glasgow Cenotaph.

Replicas were also built in other countries of the British Empire, usually by local architects with input from Lutyens. The government of Bermuda opted for a two-thirds scale replica, unveiled in 1925, having paid Lutyens a fee for his plans and for advice on the site. A wooden replica was erected in London, Ontario, until a permanent version, a three-quarters scale replica of Whitehall's, could be erected in 1934. Hong Kong's Cenotaph, unveiled in 1928, was built by a local architectural practice with input from Lutyens. The cenotaph at the Auckland War Memorial Museum in New Zealand is a copy of Whitehall's, though Lutyens was not involved in its inception—purchasing the designs from Lutyens was deemed too expensive so a local architect, Keith Draffin, sketched it from cinema newsreels. At least four other copies exist in New Zealand. Several temporary replicas were built as placeholders until permanent memorials could be built, including one in Toronto, Canada, replaced with the Old City Hall Cenotaph, and one in Melbourne, Australia, which stood until 1937, three years after the completion of the Shrine of Remembrance.

Borg observed that there was no agreed standard for war memorials, with wide variations in design, though Lutyens's Cenotaph and Sir Reginald Blomfield's Cross of Sacrifice came closest. Such was the impact of the Cenotaph that even Blomfield, a great rival of Lutyens, drew on it for his Royal Air Force Memorial a short distance away on the bank of the River Thames. According to King, the Cenotaph's popularity with the public and its widespread use and adaptation by other artists, including professional rivals, showed the extent to which it became common property rather than a concept exclusive to Lutyens. The Imperial War Museum's War Memorials Register identified at least 55 replica or similar cenotaphs in Britain alone.

Other cenotaphs by Lutyens in the UK

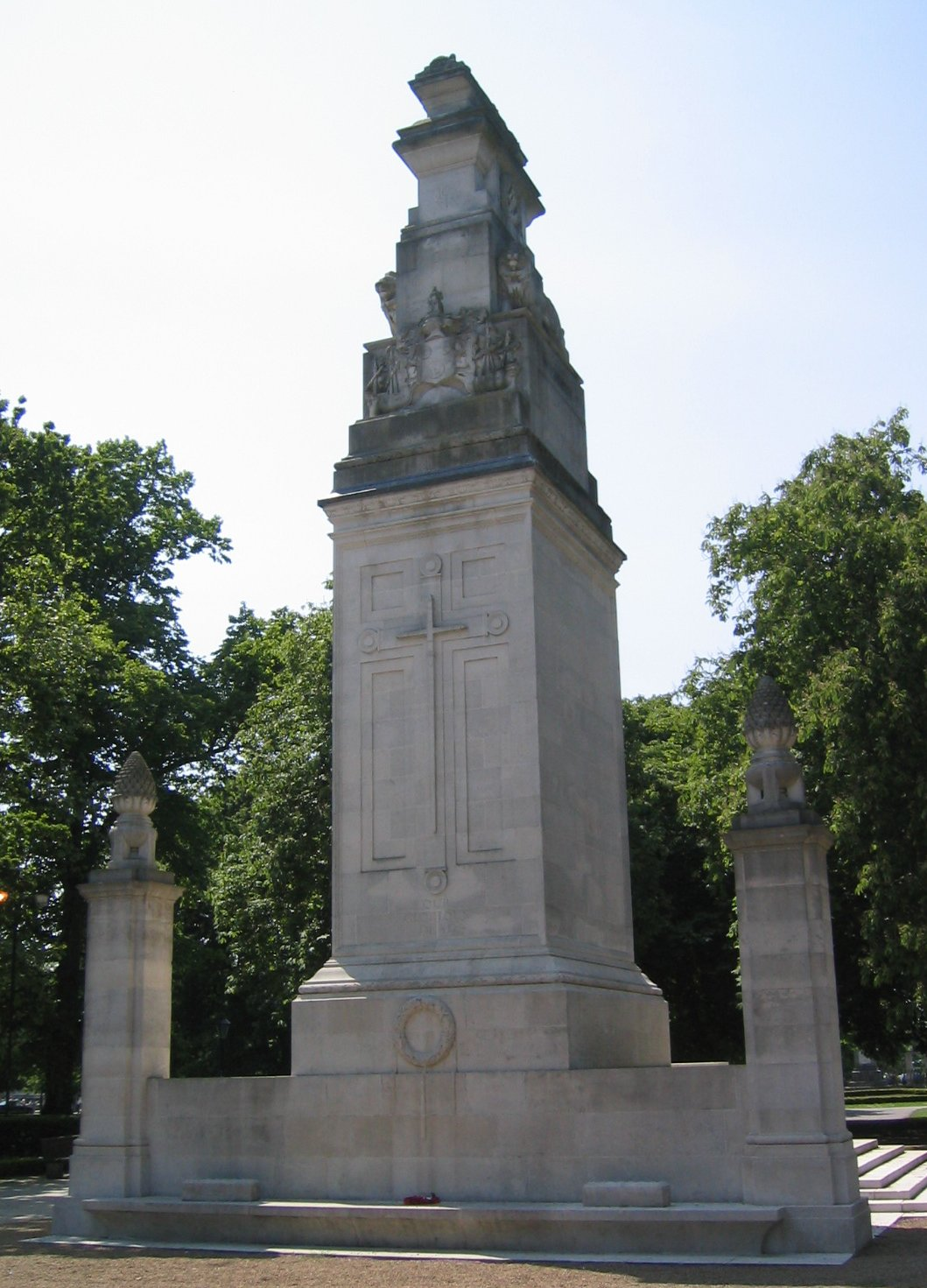
Southampton Cenotaph

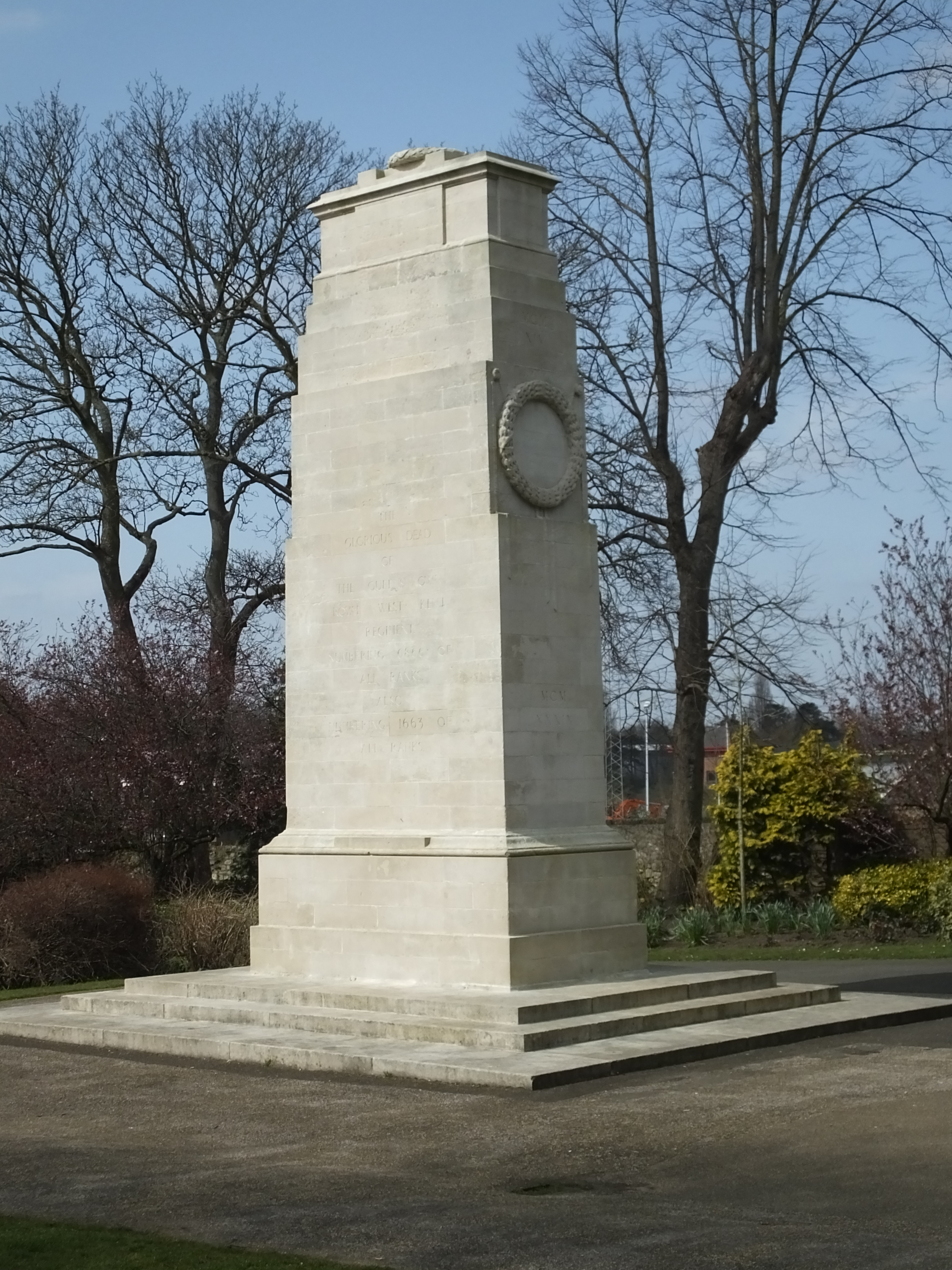
Queen's Own Royal West Kent Regiment Cenotaph, Maidstone

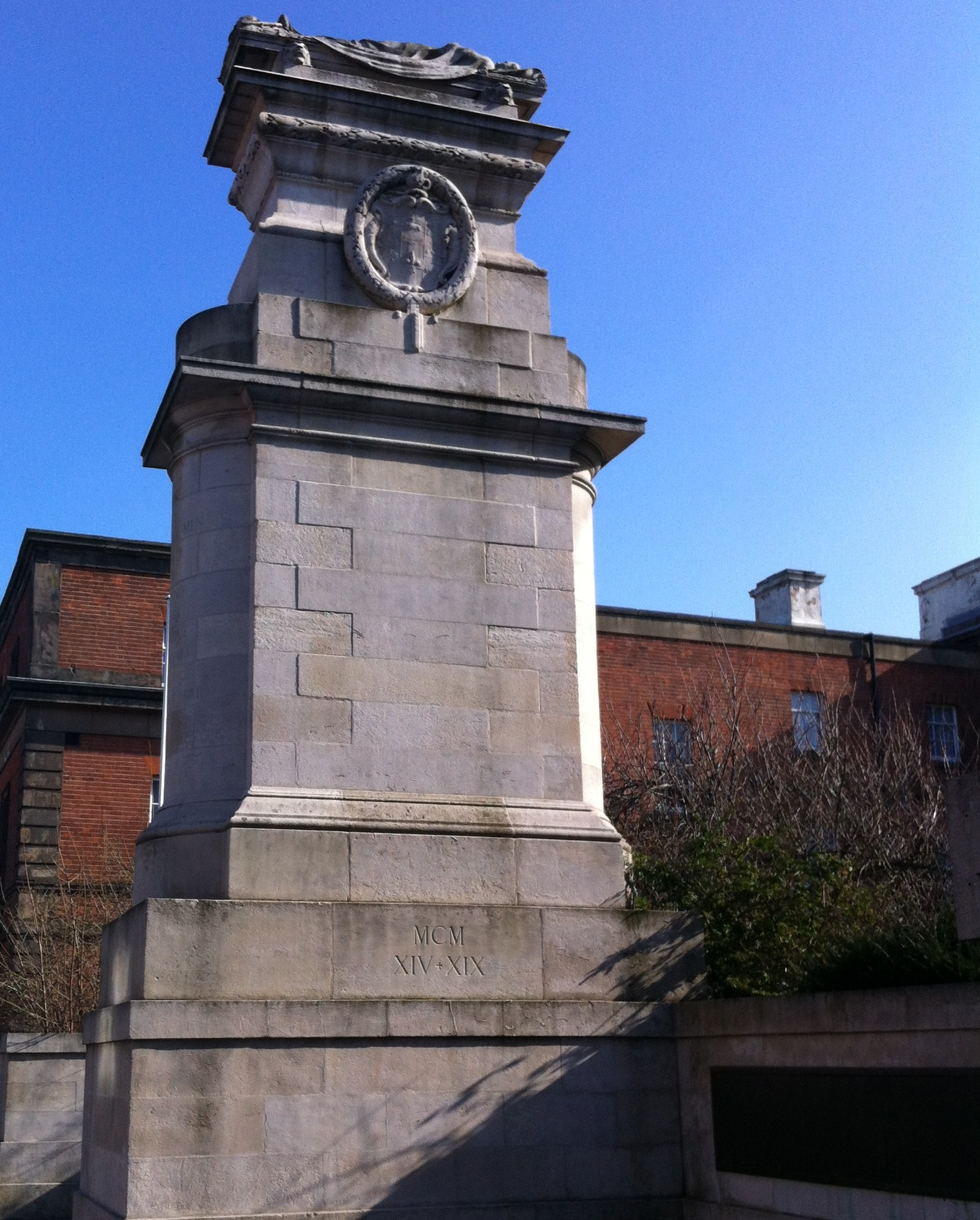
Midland Railway War Memorial, Derby

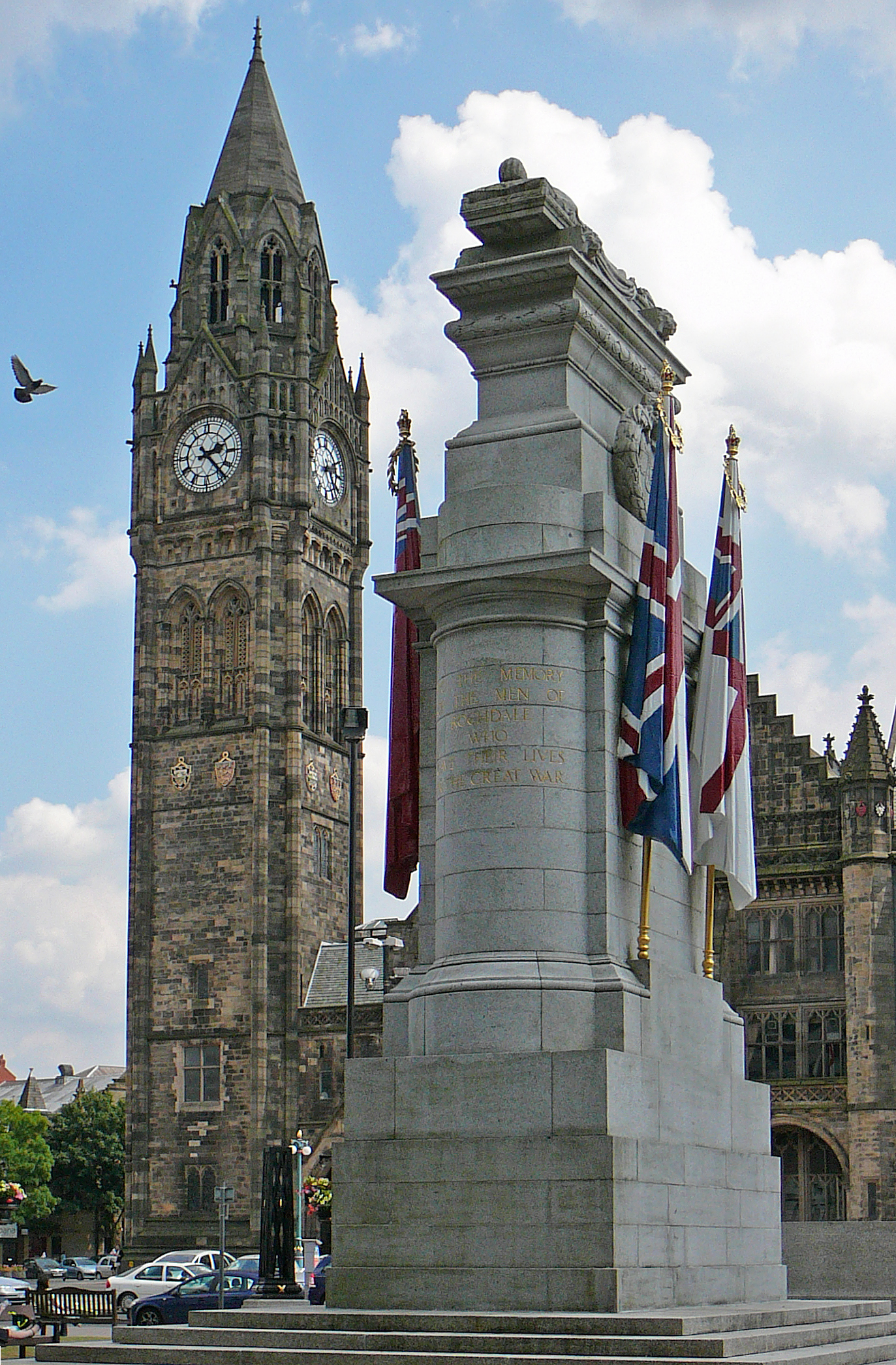
Rochdale Cenotaph

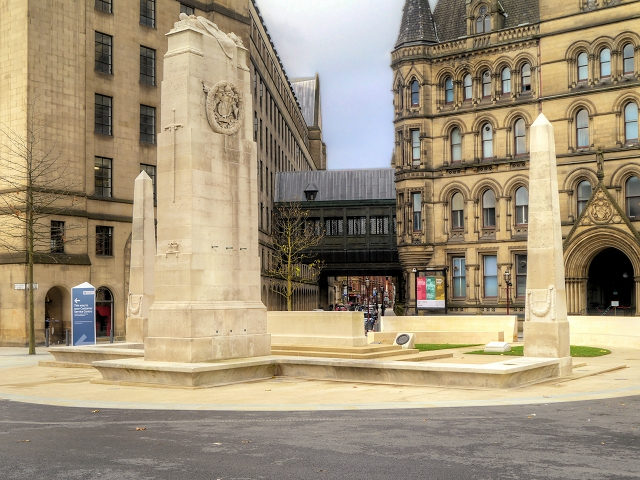
Manchester Cenotaph

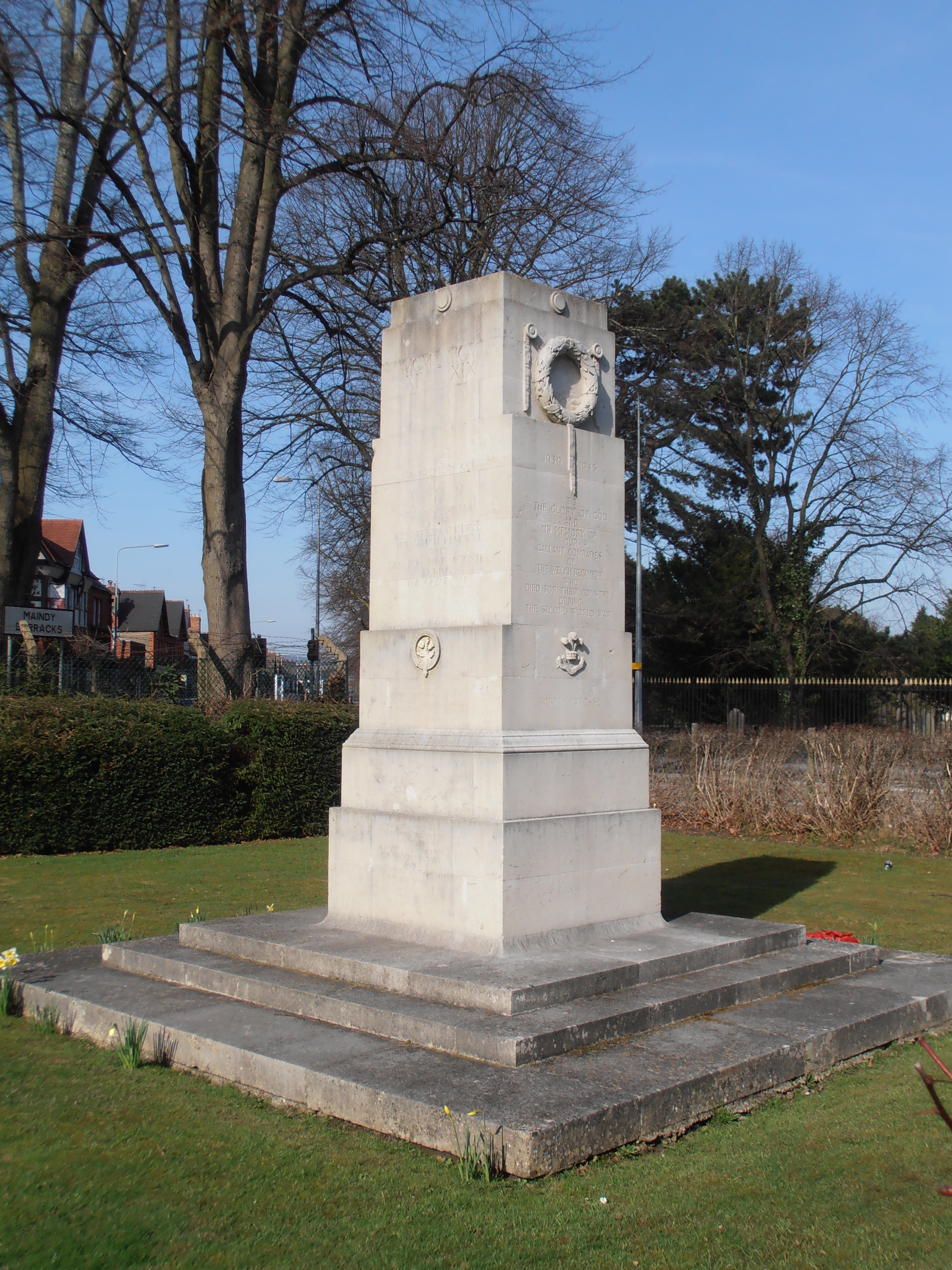
Welch Regimental War Memorial at Maindy Barracks, Cardiff

== See also ==
- World War I memorials
- Grade I listed buildings in the City of Westminster
- Grade I listed war memorials in England
- List of public art in Whitehall
- List of works by Edwin Lutyens
