= Edkins =

Edkins is a surname. The surname has patronymic origins, meaning Edkin's son. Edkin is a diminutive or pet name form of Ed or Eddie, which are shortenings of personal names such as Edward or Edmund. Mark Antony Lower calls Edkins a diminutive of Edward. In some instances, Edkins may have also emerged as a variant or altered form of Atkins or Adkins.

Notable people with the surname include:

- Alex Edkins, Canadian musician
- Barry Edkins (born 1956), New Zealand rugby player
- Don Edkins (born 1953), South African filmmaker and producer
- Jenny Edkins, British political scientist
- Joseph Edkins (1823–1905), British Protestant missionary, linguist, translator, and philologist
- Teboho Edkins (born 1980), American-born South African film director
