= Belgian Cenotaph Parade =

Annual military parade in London, England

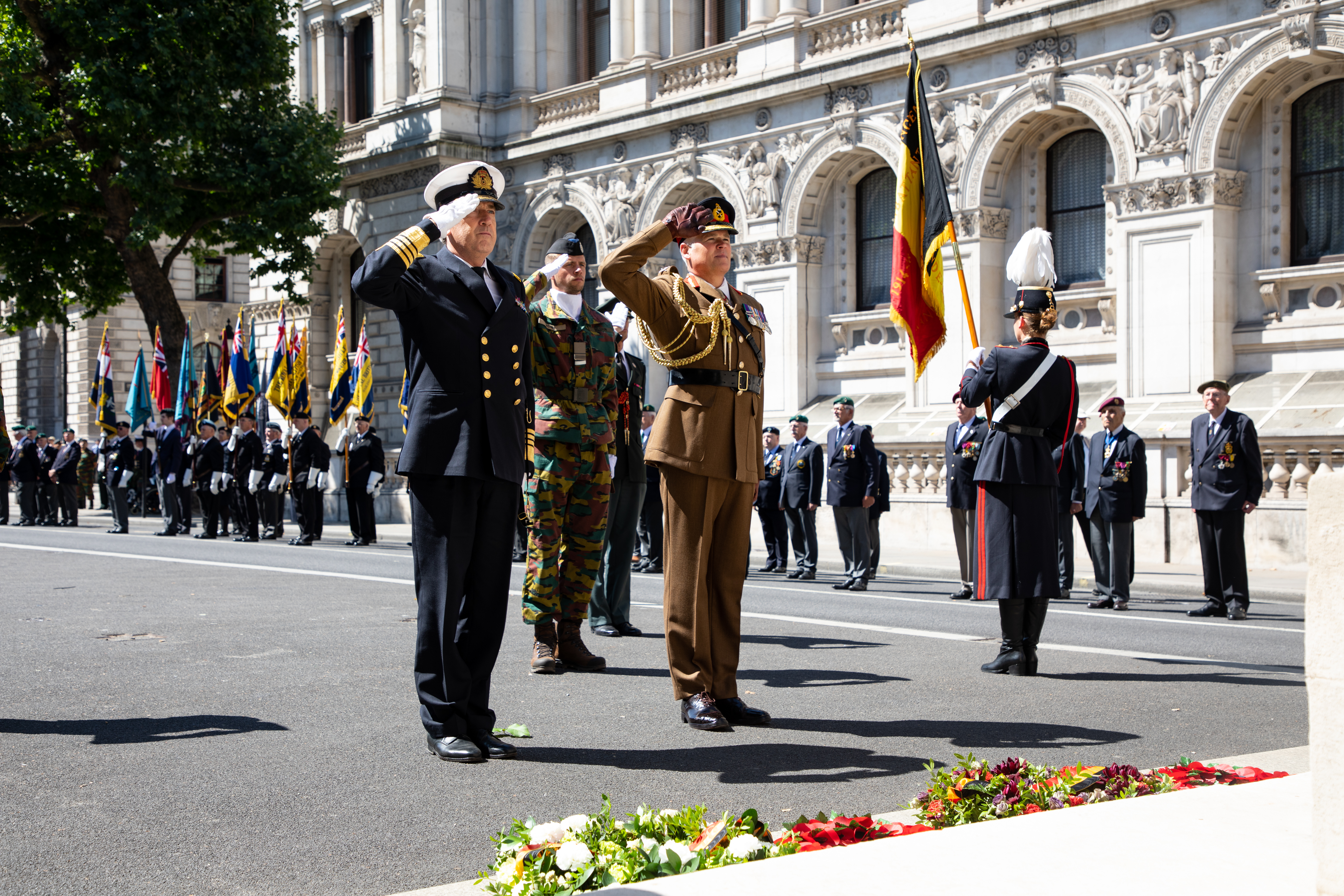
- Belgian and British military officers lay a wreath at the Cenotaph during the 2022 parade
- Begins: 1934
- Date: Saturday before Belgian National Day
- Frequency: Annual
- Related to: World War I and Anglo-Belgian relations

The Belgian Cenotaph Parade is an annual event which takes place in London, England in July. Elements of the Belgian Armed Forces participate in an armed parade from the Cenotaph, through Whitehall and Horse Guards Parade, to the Guards Memorial. Belgium is the only country outside the Commonwealth of Nations which is able to parade its soldiers, armed and in uniform, through London. The event generally takes place on the Saturday preceding Belgian National Day on 21 July.

== History ==
The annual parade was instituted in the wake of the accidental death of the Belgian monarch Albert I in February 1934 and recognises the valour of the Belgian military commanded by Albert during World War I (1914-18). It was approved by the British monarch George V who was also a relative.

The event is attended by government ministers, dignitaries, soldiers, cadets, and military veterans from both countries. After gathering at the Cenotaph at which wreaths are laid and silence observance at 11:00, the participants typically parade down Whitehall and through Horse Guards Parade to the Guards Memorial. Another observance is separately marked at Flanders Fields Memorial Garden nearby at the Guards' Chapel, Wellington Barracks.

Around 300 soldiers from the Belgian Land and Marine Components participated in the 2023 event which was also attended by the Belgian Foreign Minister Hadja Lahbib.
