= Queen's Own Royal West Kent Regiment Cenotaph =

First World War memorial in Maidstone in Kent, England

- United Kingdom
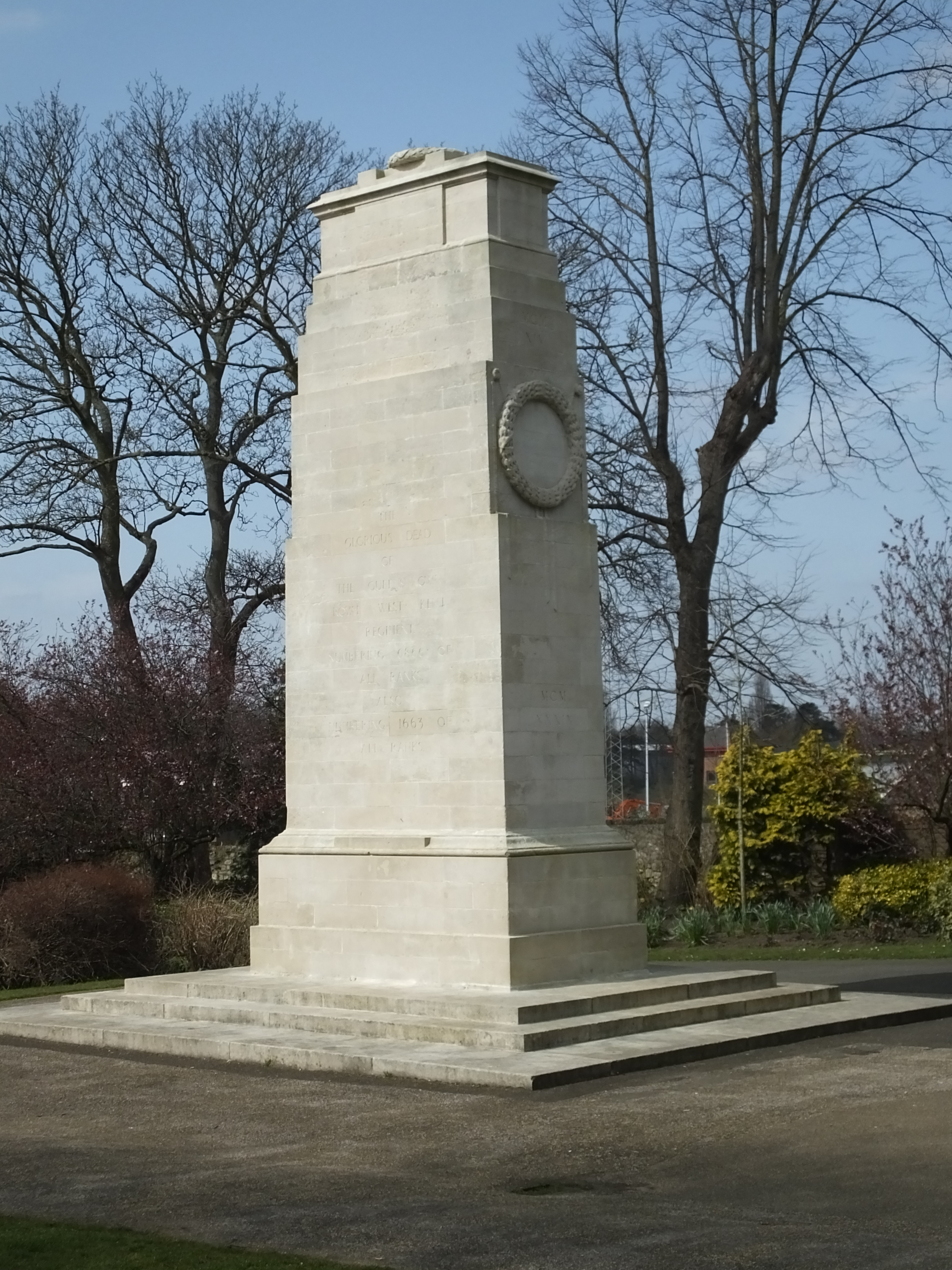
- For men of the Queen's Own Royal West Kent Regiment killed in the First World War
- Unveiled: 30 July 1921
- Location: 51.277147°N 0.520369°E; Brenchley Gardens, Maidstone, Kent
- Designed by: Sir Edwin Lutyens

Listed Building – Grade II*
- Official name: The Queen's Own Royal West Kent Regiment Cenotaph
- Designated: 2 August 1974
- Reference no.: 1086395

The Queen's Own Royal West Kent Regiment Cenotaph is a First World War memorial dedicated to members of the Queen's Own Royal West Kent Regiment and located in Maidstone in Kent, south-eastern England. Unveiled in 1921, the memorial was designed by Sir Edwin Lutyens following his design for the Cenotaph on Whitehall in London and is today a grade II* listed building.

== Background ==
In the aftermath of the First World War and its unprecedented casualties, thousands of war memorials were built across Britain. Amongst the most prominent designers of memorials was the architect Sir Edwin Lutyens, described by Historic England as "the leading English architect of his generation". Lutyens designed the Cenotaph on Whitehall in London, which became the focus for the national Remembrance Sunday commemorations, as well as the Thiepval Memorial to the Missing—the largest British war memorial anywhere in the world—and the Stone of Remembrance which appears in all large Commonwealth War Graves Commission cemeteries and in several of Lutyens' civic war memorials. The Queen's Own Royal West Kent memorial is one of seven cenotaphs in England designed by Lutyens besides the one on Whitehall, and one of two to serve as a memorial for a regiment (the other being the Royal Berkshire Regiment War Memorial in Reading, though the Welch Regiment War Memorial in Cardiff, Wales, is also a regimental memorial in the form of a cenotaph).

A committee was formed in December 1918 with a view to commissioning a war memorial for the Queen's Own Royal West Kent Regiment, who lost 6,866 men in the First World War. After settling on a reduced-scale version of the Whitehall Cenotaph, the committee commissioned Lutyens to design it. Whereas Lutyens had insisted that his Stone of Remembrance should never be reduced in size, it appears he was happy to design a two-thirds-scale cenotaph.

== History and design ==
The memorial, situated in Brenchley Gardens, was built by local construction firm GE Wallis and Sons. It was unveiled by Major General Sir Edmund Leach, colonel of the Queen's Own Royal West Kent Regiment at a ceremony on 30 July 1921. The dedication was performed by Randall Davidson, the Archbishop of Canterbury, and Lieutenant General Sir Edwin Alderson gave an address to the crowds. At the conclusion of the ceremony, the colours of the regiment's territorial battalion (reserves) and service battalion (volunteers who enlisted for the war) were laid up in All Saints Church.

The cenotaph ("empty tomb") is almost identical to that on Whitehall, except that it is reduced to two-thirds scale and is not adorned by flags. Built from Portland stone, it consists of a chest tomb, covered by a moulded laurel wreath, at the top of a three-staged rectangular base. The base sits on top of the large rectangular shaft, set back slightly towards the top, which itself rests on a two-stage base of rectangular blocks. The whole structure stands on a base of three shallow steps, typical of Lutyens' war memorials. Decorations on the memorial are sparse, consisting solely of a moulded laurel wreath on the two sides, below which are inscribed the dates of the two world wars (inscriptions for the Second World War were added later). The two faces contain the only inscriptions: "THE GLORIOUS DEAD / OF THE QUEEN'S OWN ROYAL WEST KENT REGIMENT / NUMBERING 6866 OF ALL RANKS / ALSO NUMBERING 1663 OF ALL RANKS".

The memorial was designated a grade II listed building on 2 August 1974. In October 2015, as part of commemorations for the centenary of the First World War, Lutyens' war memorials were recognised as a "national collection" and all of his free-standing memorials in England were listed or had their listing status reviewed and their National Heritage List for England list entries were updated and expanded. As part of this process, the Queen's Own Royal West Kent Regiment Cenotaph was upgraded to grade II* listed building status, as was the Royal Berkshire's memorial in Reading.

== See also ==
- Grade II* listed buildings in Maidstone (borough)
- Grade II* listed war memorials in England
