= Welch Regiment War Memorial =

War memorial in Cardiff, Wales

- United Kingdom
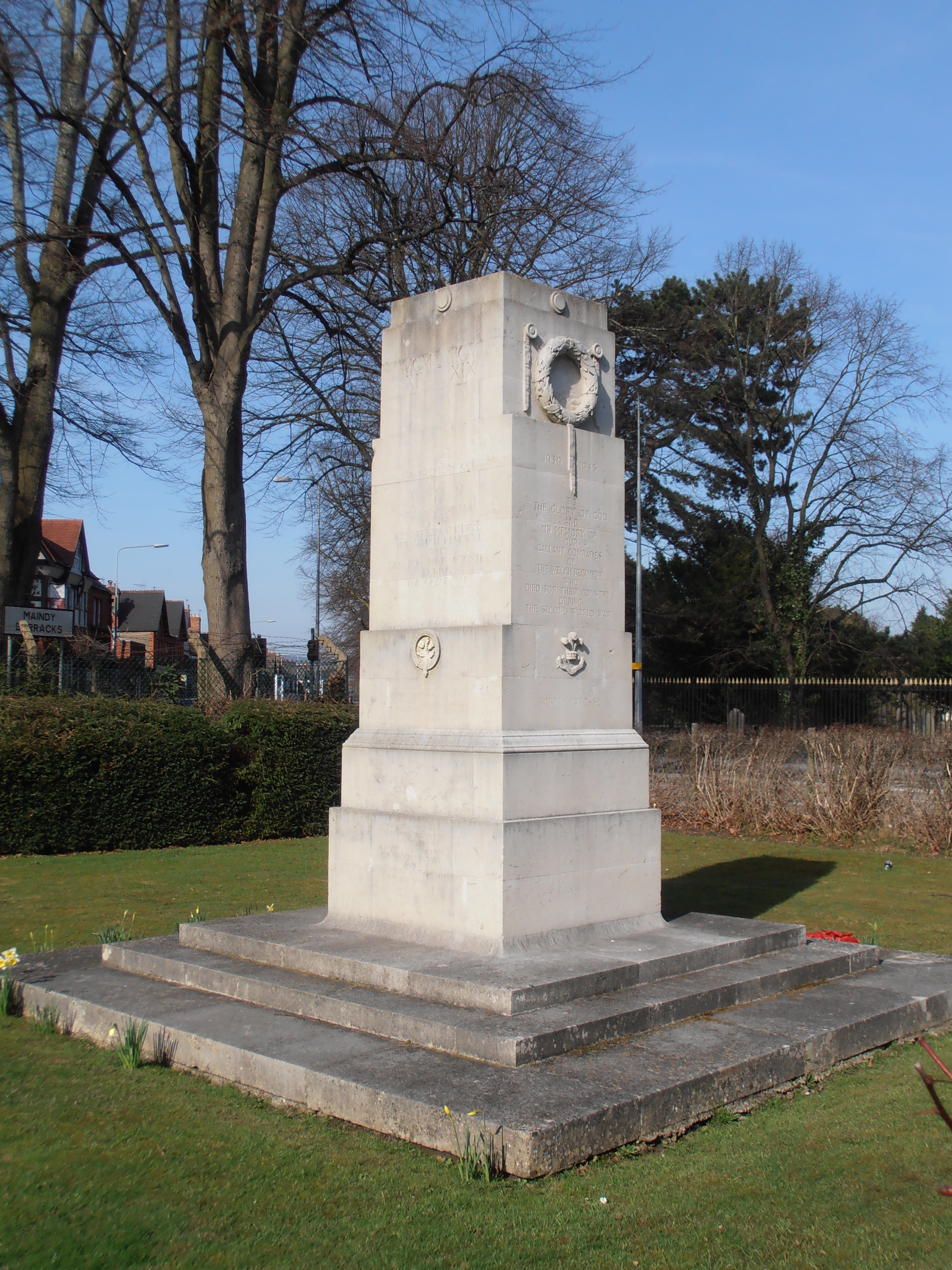
- For men of the Welch Regiment killed in the First World War
- Unveiled: 11 November 1924
- Location: 51.49831°N 3.18419°W; Maindy Barracks, Cathays, Cardiff
- Designed by: Sir Edwin Lutyens

Listed Building – Grade II
- Official name: Welch Regimental War Memorial at Maindy Barracks, Cathays
- Designated: 19 May 1975
- Reference no.: 13828

The Welch Regiment War Memorial, also known as the Maindy Monument, is a First World War memorial at Maindy Barracks in the Cathays area of Cardiff in Wales. The memorial was designed by Sir Edwin Lutyens and follows his design for the Cenotaph on Whitehall in London. Unveiled in 1924, it commemorates men of the Welch Regiment who fell in the First World War, and is today a grade II listed building.

== Background ==
In the aftermath of the First World War and its unprecedented casualties, thousands of war memorials were built across Britain. Amongst the most prominent designers of memorials was the architect Sir Edwin Lutyens, described by Historic England as "the leading English architect of his generation". Lutyens designed the Cenotaph on Whitehall in London, which became the focus for the national Remembrance Sunday commemorations, as well as the Thiepval Memorial to the Missing—the largest British war memorial anywhere in the world—and the Stone of Remembrance which appears in all large Commonwealth War Graves Commission cemeteries and in several of Lutyens' civic war memorials. The Welch Regiment is one of eight cenotaphs by Lutyens in Britain besides the one on Whitehall, one of three to serve as a memorial for a regiment (the other two being the Royal Berkshire Regiment War Memorial in Reading and the Queen's Own Royal West Kent Regiment Cenotaph in Maidstone), and the only one of his war memorials in Wales (the other eight are all in England).

The squat design of the cenotaph is reminiscent of several memorials for individuals designed by Lutyens, including American actor James Keteltas Hackett and Australian businessman Sidney Myer.

The Welch Regiment originally commissioned Lutyens to design a memorial to be sited near Gheluvelt on the Western Front in Belgium, where the regiment had been involved in fighting. The principle was approved by the Battlefield Exploits Committee in October 1922, but six months later Lutyens wrote to the War Office to inform them that the memorial would instead be erected outside Maindy Barracks, the regiment's headquarters, in Cardiff.

== History and design ==
The memorial consists of a cenotaph in Portland stone which stands on a stepped plinth and a square base, all standing on a base of three shallow steps. Then north and south faces bear inscriptions in English and Welsh (respectively), while the east and west faces contain the regiment's role of honour from the First and Second World Wars (respectively). Inscriptions relating to the Second World War and the Korean War (1950–1953) were added later. The upper sections of the east and west faces bear carvings of a laurel wreath in high relief, while regimental cap badges are carved on the lower stages of each face.

The memorial was unveiled on 11 November 1924 by Major-General Sir Thomas Marden, with the dedication carried out by the Reverend Ernest Thorold. (Note: Sources differ on the dates and details of the unveiling of the regimental cenotaph memorial. Skelton and Gliddon (2008) state that the regimental cenotaph memorial was unveiled by Field Marshal Lord Plumer on 19 July 1924. Lomax and De Courcy (1952) state that Lord Plumer unveiled a regimental memorial at Llandaff Cathedral on 19 July 1924; and the report in The Times states that Marden was also present at that unveiling. Lomax and De Courcy further state that the regimental cenotaph designed by Lutyens and erected at Maindy Barracks was unveiled on 11 November 1924 by Marden, with the original intention being to have the unveiling done by Lieutenant-General Sir R. H. K. Butler.)
