= Maindy Barracks =

- Cardiff
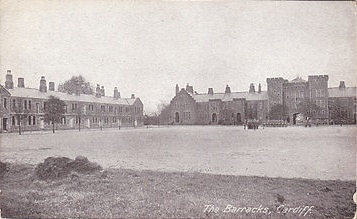
- Maindy Barracks

Site information
- Type: Barracks
- Owner: Ministry of Defence
- Operator: British Army

Location
- Location within Cardiff
- Coordinates: 51°29′55″N 03°11′13″W

Site history
- Built: 1877
- Built for: War Office
- In use: 1877–present

Garrison information
- Occupants: 3rd Battalion, The Royal Welsh

Maindy Barracks is a military installation in the Cathays district of Cardiff in Wales.

== History ==
Maindy Barracks opened in 1877. Their creation took place as part of the Cardwell Reforms which encouraged the localisation of British military forces. The barracks became the depot for the 41st (Welch) Regiment of Foot and the 69th (South Lincolnshire) Regiment of Foot. Following the Childers Reforms, the 41st and 69th regiments amalgamated to form the Welch Regiment with its depot in the barracks in 1881.

It was home to the United States Army during the First World War; the Welch Regiment War Memorial unveiled there in 1924 was designed by Sir Edwin Lutyens. The barracks were again used by the United States Army during Second World War. In the latter war it was bombed by German aircraft.

The barracks became occupied by the newly formed Royal Regiment of Wales from 1969 and by its successor regiment, the Royal Welsh, from 2006.

== Based units ==
The barracks are currently home to the following:

British Army

- Home Headquarters, Queen's Dragoon Guards
- Regimental Headquarters, Royal Welsh
- 3rd Battalion, Royal Welsh (Army Reserve)
  - Battalion Headquarters
  - Headquarters Company
- 157th (Welsh) Regiment, Royal Logistic Corps
  - Regimental Headquarters
  - 249 Headquarters Squadron
  - 580 Transport Squadron
- Wales University Officers' Training Corps
  - Headquarters
  - Cardiff Detachment

Community Cadet Forces

- A Company, Welsh Army Cadets
  - Gabalfa Detachment
- 1344 (Cardiff) Squadron, No.1 Welsh Wing Air Training Corps

== Sources ==
- Newman, John (1995). Glamorgan. The Buildings of Wales. London: Penguin.
