= Jenny Edkins =

British political scientist

Jenny Edkins is a British political scientist, Professor of Politics at the University of Manchester.

== Life ==
Edkins gained degrees from University of Oxford, City, University of London and the Open University. She gained her PhD, on theories of ideology and international politics in relation to discourses of famine, from the University of Wales, Aberystwyth in 1997. She was a cofounder of the Aberystwyth PostInternational Group (APIG). She was appointed Professor of International Politics at Aberystwyth University in 2004 and Professor of Politics at the University of Manchester in 2019.

== Works ==
- Poststructuralism & international relations: bringing the political back in. Boulder, Colorado: Lynne Rienner Publishers, 1999.
- (ed. with Nalini Persram and Véronique Pin-Fat) Sovereignty and subjectivity. Boulder, Colorado: Lynne Rienner Publishers, 1999.
- Whose hunger?: concepts of famine, practices of aid . Minneapolis: University of Minnesota Press, 2000.
- Trauma and the memory of politics. Cambridge: Cambridge University Press, 2003.
- (ed. with Véronique Pin-Fat and Michael J. Shapiro) Sovereign Lives: power in global politics. New York: Routledge, 2004.
- (ed. with Maja Zehfuss) Global politics: a new introduction. London, New York: Routledge, 2009.
- (ed with Nick Vaughan-Williams) Critical theorists and international relations. London, New York: Routledge, 2009.
- Missing: persons and politics. Ithaca: Cornell University Press, 2011.
- (ed. with Adrian Kear) International politics and performance: critical aesthetics and creative practice. New York: Routledge/Taylor & Francis Group, 2013.
- (ed.) Critical concepts in international relations. 4 vols. London, New York: Routledge, 2014.
- Face politics. London, New York: Routledge, Taylor & Francis Group, 2015.
- Change and the politics of certainty. Manchester: Manchester University Press, 2019.
- (ed.) Routledge handbook of critical international relations. New York: Routledge, 2019.
- (with Dan Bulley and Nadine El-Enany) After Grenfell: violence, resistance and response. London: Pluto Press, 2019.
