= Leeds Rifles War Memorial =

First World War memorial outside Leeds Minster in Leeds, West Yorkshire in England

- United Kingdom
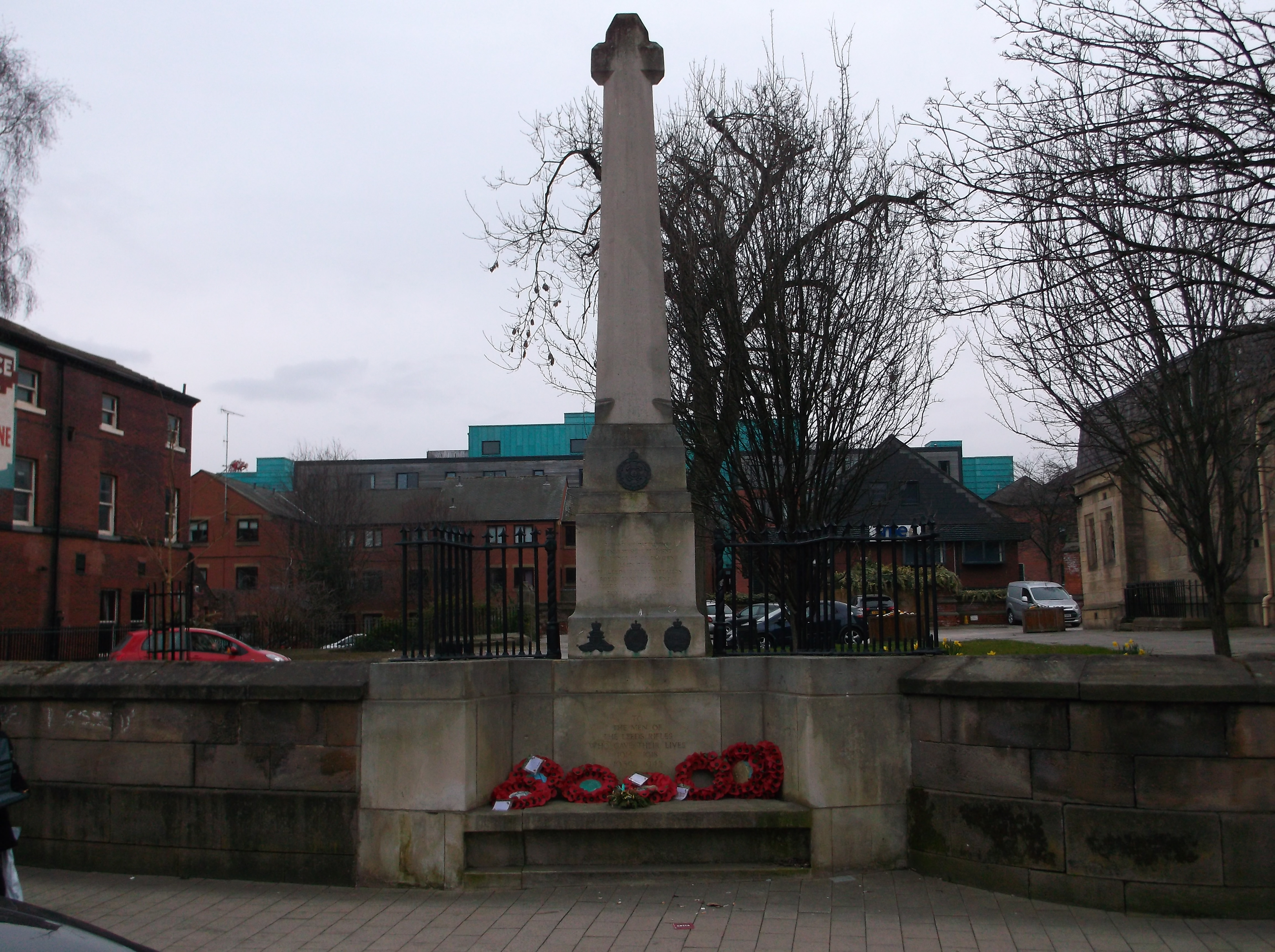
- For men of the Leeds Rifles killed in the First World War
- Unveiled: 13 November 1921
- Location: 53.79532°N 1.53543°W; Leeds Minster, Leeds, West Yorkshire
- Designed by: Sir Edwin Lutyens

Listed Building – Grade II
- Official name: North Boundary Wall and Steps, North West Gate and Piers, War Memorial and East Bar Stone
- Designated: 8 May 1974
- Reference no.: 1375049

The Leeds Rifles War Memorial is a First World War memorial outside Leeds Minster on Kirkgate in Leeds, West Yorkshire in northern England. The memorial was designed by Sir Edwin Lutyens, one of 15 instances of his War Cross and the only one commissioned by a regiment. The memorial, dedicated to members of the Leeds Rifles who fell in the First World War (with later additions for the Second World War), was unveiled on Remembrance Sunday, 13 November 1921, and is today a grade II listed building.

== Background ==
In the aftermath of the First World War and its unprecedented casualties, thousands of war memorials were built across Britain. Amongst the most prominent designers of memorials was the architect Sir Edwin Lutyens, described by Historic England as "the leading English architect of his generation". Lutyens designed the Cenotaph on Whitehall in London, which became the focus for the national Remembrance Sunday commemorations, as well as the Thiepval Memorial to the Missing—the largest British war memorial anywhere in the world—and the Stone of Remembrance which appears in all large Commonwealth War Graves Commission cemeteries and in several of Lutyens' civic war memorials. As well as civic memorials, Lutyens designed multiple war memorials for private companies and individual regiments.

The Leeds Rifles was the only regiment to choose Lutyens' War Cross design for its memorial, a design used mostly for civic memorials in towns and villages.

== History and design ==
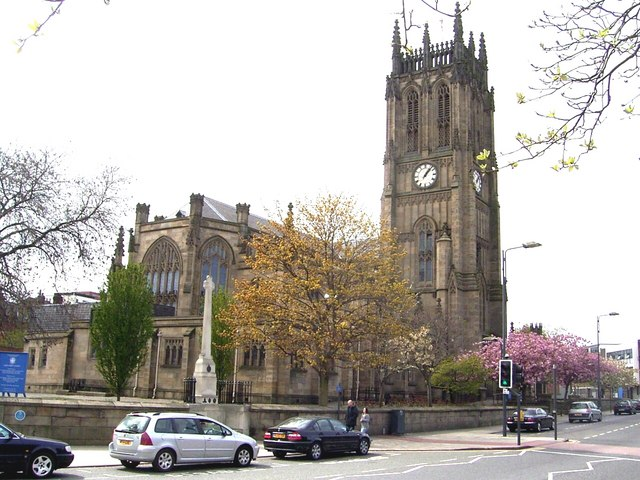
Leeds Minster, with the Leeds Rifles memorial visible in the foreground to the left

The memorial is a comparatively small version of the War Cross, set into the church wall of Leeds Minster and facing out onto Kirkgate. The Portland stone of the war memorial creates a contrast with the sandstone of the church wall. Because of the difference in level between the churchyard and the street, the memorial incorporates a stone bench which doubles as a platform for wreaths. At the height of the wall, the cross is surrounded on three sides by decorative iron railings with arrowhead finials.

The base of the cross in inscribed "7TH AND 8TH BATTALIONS / WEST YORKSHIRE REGIMENT / THE PRINCE OF WALES'S OWN / LEEDS RIFLES / 45TH (LEEDS RIFLES) BATTALION / ROYAL TANK REGIMENT / 66TH (LEEDS RIFLES) HAA REGIMENT / ROYAL ARTILLERY"; at the level of the churchyard wall is the further inscription "TO THE MEN OF THE LEEDS RIFLES WHO GAVE THEIR LIVES / 1914-1918 / 1939-1945" (the dates of the Second World War were added later). In bronze above the inscription is the cap badge of the Leeds Rifles, and below it are the regimental cap badges of the Royal Artillery, the Prince of Wales's Own (West Yorkshire Regiment), and the Royal Tank Regiment, in which volunteers of the Leeds Rifles served.

Just to the east of the memorial is the East Bar stone, marking the former location of a bar (gate) in the town walls; the wall and bar stone are part of the same listing as the war memorial.

The memorial was unveiled on Remembrance Sunday, 13 November 1921, by Captain George Sanders, an officer of the Leeds Rifles who had earned a Victoria Cross in the war.

The Leeds Rifles War Memorial was designated a grade II listed building on 8 May 1974. In March 2015, as part of commemorations for the centenary of the First World War, Lutyens' war memorials were recognised as a "national collection" and all of his free-standing memorials in England were listed or had their listing status reviewed and their National Heritage List for England list entries were updated and expanded.

== See also ==
Other Lutyens memorials dedicated to individual regiments or units:

- Civil Service Rifles War Memorial, Somerset House, London
- Lancashire Fusiliers War Memorial, Bury, Lancashire
- Oxfordshire and Buckinghamshire Light Infantry War Memorial, Cowley, Oxfordshire
- Queen's Own Royal West Kent Regiment Cenotaph, Maidstone, Kent
- Royal Naval Division War Memorial, Horseguards Parade, London
- Royal Berkshire Regiment War Memorial, Reading, Berkshire
- Welch Regiment War Memorial, Cardiff
