= Oxfordshire and Buckinghamshire Light Infantry War Memorial =

First World War memorial in the Cowley area of Oxford in southern England

- United Kingdom
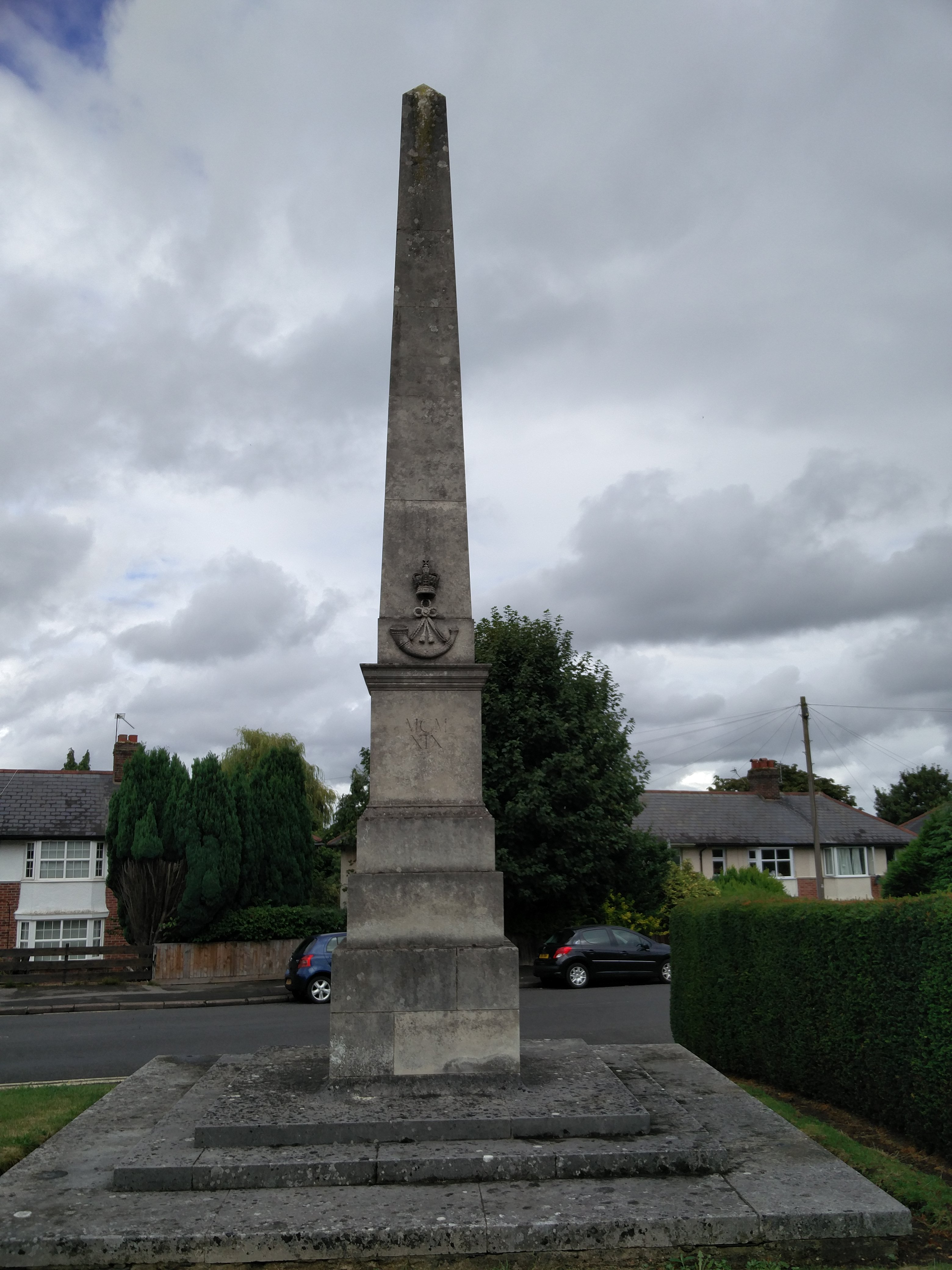
- For men of the Oxfordshire and Buckinghamshire Light Infantry killed in the First World War
- Unveiled: 11 November 1923
- Location: 51.73233°N 1.22830°W; Cowley, Oxford, England
- Designed by: Sir Edwin Lutyens

Listed Building – Grade II
- Official name: Oxfordshire and Buckinghamshire Light Infantry War Memorial
- Designated: 28 June 1972
- Reference no.: 1369419

The Oxfordshire and Buckinghamshire Light Infantry War Memorial is a First World War memorial in the Cowley area of Oxford in southern England. Designed by Sir Edwin Lutyens, it commemorates men of the Oxfordshire and Buckinghamshire Light Infantry killed in the conflict; it was unveiled on Armistice Day, 11 November 1923, and has been a grade II listed building since 1972.

== Background ==
In the aftermath of the First World War and its unprecedented casualties, thousands of war memorials were built across Britain. Amongst the most prominent designers of memorials was the architect Sir Edwin Lutyens, described by Historic England as "the leading English architect of his generation". Lutyens designed the Cenotaph on Whitehall in London, which became the focus for the national Remembrance Sunday commemorations, as well as the Thiepval Memorial to the Missing—the largest British war memorial anywhere in the world—and the Stone of Remembrance which appears in all large Commonwealth War Graves Commission cemeteries and in several of Lutyens' civic war memorials. As well as civic memorials, Lutyens designed multiple war memorials for private companies and individual regiments.

The regiment originally planned a memorial outside its headquarters at Cowley Barracks but was unable to find a suitable site for it. Instead, the memorial was built on a site on Rose Hill in Cowley on land donated by Christ Church College (one of the constituent colleges of the University of Oxford), the location having been chosen so that the memorial would be visible against the sky.

== History and design ==
The memorial consists of a single obelisk sat on a moulded pedestal and a plain square base and, typically for Lutyens' war memorials, it rises centrally from three shallow steps. The only relief on the obelisk is a carving of the regimental cap badge—described by Historic England as "immediately announcing the identity of those commemorated"—on two of the faces. The west face of the base bears the inscription "TO THE GLORIOUS MEMORY OF 5878 OF ALL RANKS OF THE OXFORDSHIRE AND BUCKINGHAMSHIRE LIGHT INFANTRY WHO FELL IN THE GREAT WAR"; this was supplemented later by an inscription on the east face: "TO THE GLORIOUS MEMORY OF 1408 ALL RANKS OF THE OXFORDSHIRE AND BUCKINGHAMSHIRE LIGHT INFANTRY WHO GAVE THEIR LIVES IN THE SECOND WORLD WAR 1939 – 1945". The dates of the First World War are inscribed on the other two faces in Roman numerals: MCMXIV on the north and MCMXIX on the south. The obelisk is similar to the Lancashire Fusiliers War Memorial, also an obelisk dedicated to an individual regiment located in Bury in the north-west of England, but is described by author Tim Skelton as being a "much plainer" design.

The unveiling was performed by the colonel of the regiment, Major-General Sir John Hanbury-Williams, on Armistice Day, 11 November 1923.

The Oxfordshire and Buckinghamshire Light Infantry War Memorial was designated a grade II listed building on 28 June 1972. In March 2015, as part of commemorations for the centenary of the First World War, Lutyens' war memorials were recognised as a "national collection" and all of his free-standing memorials in England were listed or had their listing status reviewed and their National Heritage List for England list entries were updated and expanded.

== See also ==
Other Lutyens memorials dedicated to individual regiments or units:

- Civil Service Rifles War Memorial, Somerset House, London
- Leeds Rifles War Memorial, Leeds Minster, West Yorkshire
- Royal Naval Division War Memorial, Horseguards Parade, London
- Royal Berkshire Regiment War Memorial, Reading, Berkshire
- Queen's Own Royal West Kent Regiment Cenotaph, Maidstone, Kent
