= Wellington Barracks, Bury =

Military installation on Bolton Road in Bury

Wellington Barracks
- Bury
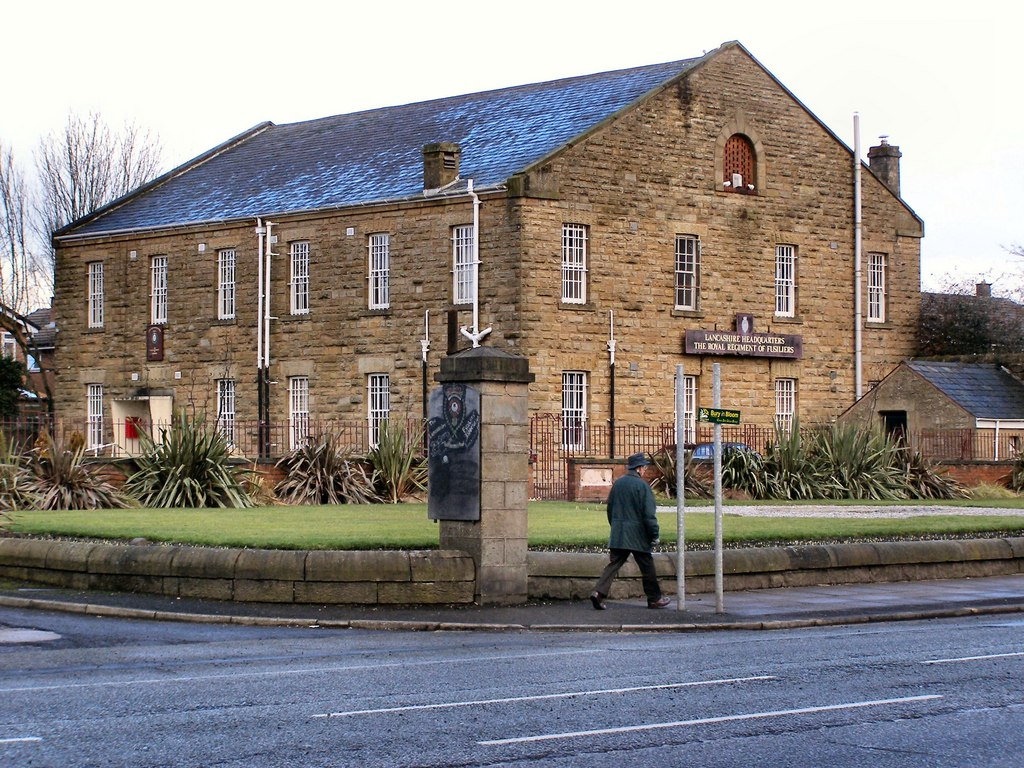
- The Regimental Headquarters at Wellington Barracks

Site information
- Type: Barracks
- Owner: Ministry of Defence
- Operator: British Army

Location
- Location within Greater Manchester
- Coordinates: 53.58811°N 2.32167°W

Site history
- Built: 1845
- Built for: War Office
- In use: 1845-1968

Garrison information
- Occupants: Lancashire Fusiliers

Wellington Barracks was a military installation on Bolton Road in Bury, Greater Manchester.

== History ==
The barracks were completed as part of the response to the Chartist riots in 1845. In 1873 a system of recruiting areas based on counties was instituted under the Cardwell Reforms and the barracks became the depot for the two battalions of the 20th (East Devonshire) Regiment with the Bury-based 7th Royal Lancashire Militia (Rifles). Following the Childers Reforms, these regiments merged (with the addition of local Volunteer battalions) to become the Lancashire Fusiliers in 1881, with its depot in the barracks.

The Regiment amalgamated with several other regiments to form the Royal Regiment of Fusiliers in 1968 and the barracks were demolished in 1969. The Regimental Headquarters were retained and used as the Fusilier Regimental Museum until 2009 when the collection moved to Moss Street in Bury. The Regimental Headquarters was then converted into a business complex in 2013.

The Lancashire Fusiliers War Memorial stood outside the entrance to the barracks until 2009, when it was moved to Gallipoli Gardens, next to the relocated regimental museum.
