= List of museums in Greater Manchester =

This list of museums in Greater Manchester, England contains museums which are defined for this context as institutions (including nonprofit organizations, government entities, and private businesses) that collect and care for objects of cultural, artistic, scientific, or historical interest and make their collections or related exhibits available for public viewing. Also included are non-profit art galleries and university art galleries. Museums that exist only in cyberspace (i.e., virtual museums) are not included.

Name	Image	Town/city	Region	Type	Summary
Astley Cheetham Art Gallery		Stalybridge	Tameside	Art	collections include 15th-century Italian paintings, British art of the 19th and 20th centuries, situated in Stalybridge town centre, above Stalybridge Library
Astley Green Colliery Museum		Astley	Wigan	Mining	Former coal mine with headgear, engine house, and collection of colliery locomotives
Bolton Museum		Bolton	Bolton	Multiple	Local history, natural history, archaeology, art, aquarium, ancient Egypt
Bolton Steam Museum		Bolton	Bolton	Technology	Preserved steam engines
Bramall Hall		Bramhall	Stockport	Historic house	Timber-framed Tudor manor house, parklands
British Muslim Heritage Centre		Manchester	Whalley Range	Historic building	A Grade II* building used to be a college for Nonconformists. Now, it features British Muslims involvement in WW II, and the House of Wisdom (an exhibition dedicated to civilization contributions by Muslims. The centre offers other cultural and community services. Open day is also available.
Bury Art Museum		Bury	Bury	Multiple	Victorian paintings, contemporary art, photography and craft, local history and culture
Bury Transport Museum		Bury	Bury	Transportation	located in the former goods warehouse for the East Lancashire Railway, development of transport in the North West, railway cars and equipment, historic road vehicles and buses, steam rollers
Castlefield Gallery		Manchester	Manchester	Art	Artist-led gallery for contemporary visual art
Central Art Gallery		Ashton-under-Lyne	Tameside	Art	exhibits include paintings, sculpture, installation and textiles, also Rutherford Gallery with work by local artist Harry Rutherford
Centre for Chinese Contemporary Art		Manchester	Manchester	Art	Contemporary art from Chinese artists from around the world
Clayton Hall Living History Museum		Manchester	Manchester		Once owned by the Byron family and Sir Humphrey Chetham. The hall is located on a mound (designated as an Ancient Monument) and reached by a stone bridge over the now dry moat.
Dunham Massey Hall		Dunham Massey	Trafford	Historic house	Operated by the National Trust, Georgian house, deer park, gardens
Elizabeth Gaskell's House		Manchester	Manchester	Historic house	Mid-19th-century home of author Elizabeth Gaskell and ties to other authors
Ellenroad Engine House		Newhey	Rochdale	Technology	Fully working 3000-horsepower cotton mill engine with its original steam plant, other steam engines
Fusilier Museum		Bury	Bury	Military	History and memorabilia of the Lancashire Fusiliers and the Royal Regiment of Fusiliers
Gallery of Costume		Fallowfield	Manchester	Fashion	Clothing and accessories from the 17th century to the present, located in Platt Fields Park and operated by Manchester Art Gallery
Gallery Oldham		Oldham	Oldham	Multiple	Art, social and natural history collections alongside touring work, newly commissioned and contemporary art, international art and work produced with local communities
Greater Manchester Fire Service Museum		Rochdale	Rochdale	Firefighting	full-size fire appliances, equipment, uniforms, models, photographs, medals and insignia, memorabilia
Greater Manchester Police Museum		Manchester	Manchester	Law enforcement	Victorian police station and cells, magistrate's court, historic police equipment and uniforms, vehicles, forgery and forensic science
Haigh Hall		Wigan	Wigan	Historic house	Mid-19th-century country house open for tours
Hall i' th' Wood		Bolton	Bolton	Historic house	Early 16th-century timber-framed manor house, open by appointment and on special days
Hat Works		Stockport	Stockport	Industry	Hat-making industry, hats and headgear
Heaton Hall		Manchester	Manchester	Historic house	18th-century period country house, located in Heaton Park and operated by Manchester Art Gallery
Heaton Park Tramway		Manchester	Manchester	Railway	Restored trams, located in Heaton Park
HOME		Manchester	Manchester	Art	International centre for contemporary visual arts and film
Horwich Heritage Centre		Horwich	Bolton	Local	local history, culture, industry, transportation
Imperial War Museum North		Trafford Park	Trafford	Military	20th- and 21st-century conflicts involving British and Commonwealth citizens
John Rylands Library		Manchester	Manchester	Library	Exhibits of art, history, literature from its collections
The Lowry		Salford Quays	Salford	Art	Arts centre with exhibit galleries for modern and contemporary art, photography and design, and works by LS Lowry
Manchester Art Gallery		Manchester	Manchester	Art	Collection includes English, Dutch, French and Italian historic paintings, modern and contemporary art, works relating to Manchester, textiles, metalwork, toys, silverware and furniture
Manchester Jewish Museum		Cheetham Hill	Manchester	Ethnic	Located in a former late 19th-century Spanish and Portuguese synagogue, history and culture of Manchester's Jewish community
Manchester Museum		Manchester	Manchester	Multiple	Operated by the University of Manchester, natural history including dinosaurs and geology, Ancient Egypt, money, archery, archaeology, anthropology, city's history and culture, and vivarium
Manchester United Museum		Old Trafford	Trafford	Sports	History and memorabilia of Manchester United F.C., located at Old Trafford stadium
Mossley Industrial Heritage Centre		Mossley	Tameside	Industry	local cotton industry, houses in a former cotton-spinning mill
Museum of Science and Industry		Manchester	Manchester	Multiple	Science, technology, industry, transportation and the city's contributions
Museum of the Manchester Regiment		Ashton-under-Lyne	Tameside	Military	history and artifacts of the Manchester Regiment
Museum of Transport		Cheetham Hill	Manchester	Transportation	Buses and public transportation history
Museum of Wigan Life		Wigan	Wigan	Local	Formerly the History Shop and Wigan Public Library. Includes exhibits on local history, culture, archaeology and industry.
National Football Museum		Manchester	Manchester	Sports	Located in the Urbis building, association football history and memorabilia
Ordsall Hall		Ordsall	Salford	Historic house	Former stately home dating back to the 15th century, includes stained and painted glass, local history exhibits
Pankhurst Centre		Chorlton-on-Medlock	Manchester	Historic house	Home of suffragette leader Emmeline Pankhurst and family, history of the movement
Park Bridge Heritage Centre		Park Bridge	Tameside	Local	Local history, ironworks, natural history
People's History Museum		Spinningfields	Manchester	History	History of working people in the United Kingdom and labour relations
Portland Basin Museum		Ashton-under-Lyne	Tameside	Local	Local history, industry, trades, 1920s street with shops, period rooms, historic machines
Rochdale Pioneers Museum		Rochdale	Rochdale	History	Historic store and history of the early consumers' cooperative
Saddleworth Museum		Saddleworth	Oldham	Local	Local history, trades, textile industry, canals, railroads, transportation, culture, exhibits of local and regional contemporary art
Salford Museum and Art Gallery		Salford	Salford	Multiple	Local history, Victorian art, replica Victorian street with shops, contemporary art and photography exhibits
Smithills Hall		Bolton	Bolton	Historic house	Family home dating back to the 14th century, reflects medieval, Tudor and Victorian periods
Staircase House		Stockport	Stockport	Historic house	15th-century medieval house with rooms from different centuries
Stockport Art Gallery		Stockport	Stockport	Art	
Stockport Air Raid Shelters		Stockport	Stockport	Military	Almost 1 mile of underground air-raid shelters used during World War II
Stockport Museum		Stockport	Stockport	Local	local history, archaeology, industry, transportation, culture
Touchstones Rochdale		Rochdale	Rochdale	Multiple	Art, local history, culture
Trencherfield Mill Steam Engine		Wigan	Wigan	Technology	Massive 2,500 horse power working steam engine for the textile mill, open on Sundays
Whitworth Art Gallery		Moss Side	Manchester	Art	Collections include modern art, watercolours, sculpture, wallpaper and textiles, part of the University of Manchester
Wythenshawe Hall		Northenden	Manchester	Historic house	16th-century Tudor house reflecting four centuries of use

== Defunct museums ==
- Cube Gallery, Manchester, closed in 2013
- Setantii Museum, Ashton-under-Lyne, closed in 2012
- Urbis, former independent exhibition space, now home to the National Football Museum
- Vernon Park Museum, Offerton, closed in 2012
- Manchester Art Museum, also known as the Horsfall Museum or Ancoats Museum. It closed in 1953 and its contents were absorbed into the collection of Manchester City Art Gallery.
- The Cornerhouse was a centre for cinema and the contemporary visual arts. It merged with the Library Theatre Company, becoming HOME and relocating to a purpose-built site.

== See also ==
- Category:Tourist attractions in Greater Manchester
