= Cowley Barracks =

Military installation in Oxfordshire, England

- Oxford
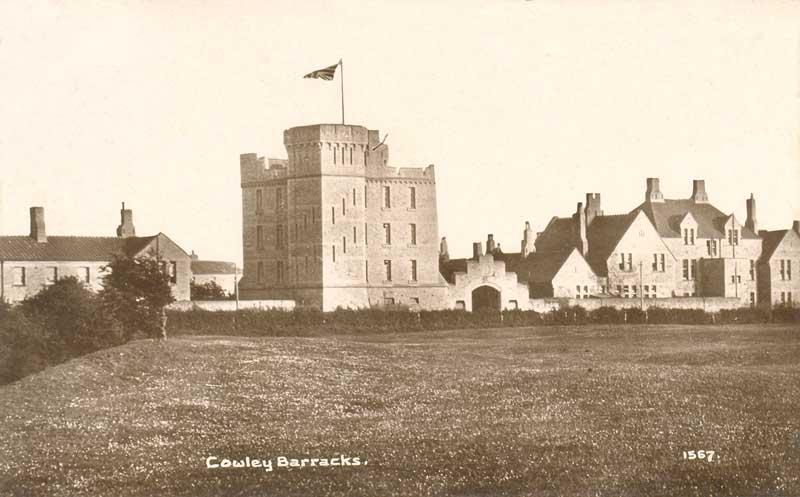
- Cowley Barracks showing the original keep

Site information
- Type: Barracks
- Owner: Ministry of Defence
- Operator: British Army

Location
- Location within Oxfordshire
- Coordinates: 51.74184°N 1.20243°W

Site history
- Built: 1876
- Built for: War Office
- In use: 1876–1959

Garrison information
- Occupants: Oxfordshire and Buckinghamshire Light Infantry

Cowley Barracks (originally Bullingdon Barracks) was a military installation in Cowley, Oxfordshire, England.

== History ==
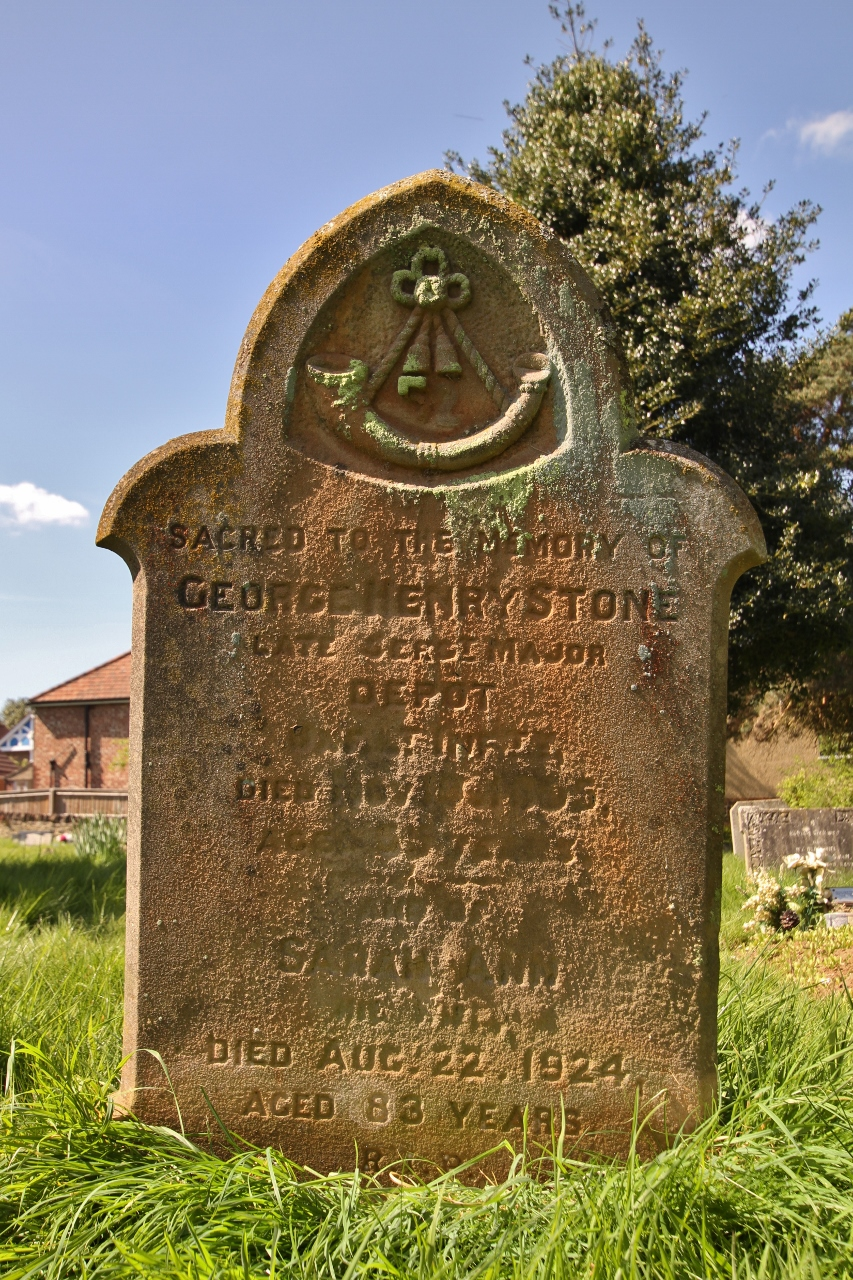
Headstone in St James' parish churchyard, Cowley, Oxfordshire of George and Sarah Stone. George had been Depot Sergeant Major in the Oxfordshire Light Infantry, presumably at Cowley Barracks. An eroded trace of the number "52" is visible in the regimental badge carved at the top of the stone.

The barracks were built in a Fortress Gothic Revival style at Bullingdon Green using Charlbury stone and completed in spring 1876. Their creation took place as part of the Cardwell Reforms which encouraged the localisation of British military forces. The barracks became the depot for the 52nd (Oxfordshire) Regiment of Foot and the 85th Regiment of Foot (Bucks Volunteers). Following the Childers Reforms, the 43rd (Monmouthshire) Regiment of Foot (Light Infantry) and the 52nd (Oxfordshire) Regiment of Foot amalgamated to form the Oxfordshire Light Infantry with its depot at the barracks in 1881.

Following the Haldane Reforms, the Oxfordshire Light Infantry became the Oxfordshire and Buckinghamshire Light Infantry in 1908. Many recruits enlisted at the barracks during the early stages of the First World War.

The original proposal for the Oxfordshire and Buckinghamshire Light Infantry War Memorial was to site it outside the barracks. No suitable site could be found there, so instead it was built on Rose Hill at the junction with Church Cowley Road.

The Oxfordshire & Buckinghamshire Light Infantry Museum was established at the barracks in 1925. During the Second World War, the barracks were used as a base for the Home Guard.

The Oxfordshire & Buckinghamshire Light Infantry left the barracks in 1959. Although the men's quarters were retained, the keep was subsequently demolished. The museum collection moved from Cowley Barracks to the Slade Park Territorial Army base at that time.

Between 1980 and 1992, the national headquarters of the United Kingdom Warning and Monitoring Organisation was located on the site. Co-located with this organisation was the Headquarters of No 3 Oxford Group Royal Observer Corps. The site now belongs to Oxford Brookes University, which has built student accommodation on the site.

On 15 August 2019, a plinth was unveiled at the Parade Green student accommodation in James Wolfe Road in memory of the barracks.
