= George Sanders (VC) =

English Victoria Cross recipient (1894-1950)

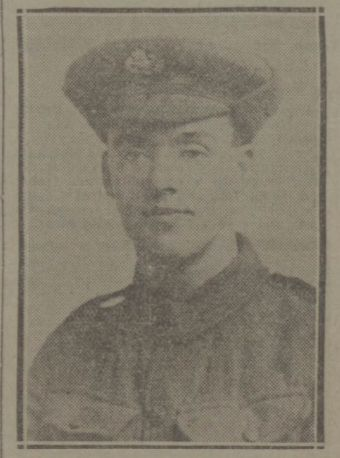
- Sanders pictured in the Leeds Mercury on the announcement of his Victoria Cross award
- Born: 8 July 1894; Leeds, West Yorkshire, England
- Died: 4 April 1950 (aged 55); Leeds, West Yorkshire, England
- Military career
- Allegiance: United Kingdom
- Branch: British Army
- Service years: 1914-1919
- Rank: Captain
- Units: West Yorkshire Regiment
- Conflicts: First World War
- Awards: Victoria Cross; Military Cross

George Sanders VC MC (8 July 1894 – 4 April 1950) was an English recipient of the Victoria Cross, the highest and most prestigious award for gallantry in the face of the enemy that can be awarded to British and Commonwealth forces.

== Early life ==
George Sanders was the son of Thomas and Amy Sanders. He received his education at Little Holbeck School and after completing his time there was indentured as an apprentice fitter at the nearby Airedale Foundry.

== Military service ==
George enlisted for service on 9 November 1914 and was drafted as a private and later promoted to corporal to the 1/7th (Leeds Rifles) Battalion, West Yorkshire Regiment (The Prince of Wales's Own), British Army during the First World War. The Battalion went to France in April 1915 and in 1916 were to take part in the Battle of the Somme

=== VC action ===
On 1 July 1916 near Thiepval, France, Sanders' battalion were in reserve but late the afternoon the battalion was ordered to advance into the Schwaben Redoubt which had been captured earlier in the day and was being counter-attacked. After an advance into the enemy's trenches, 21-year old Corporal Sanders found himself isolated with a party of 30 men. For 36 hours Sanders' small force held off German attacks before being relieved and leading the 19 survivors back to the British lines.

Sanders' actions were recognised with the award of the Victoria Cross which was published in the London Gazette on 9 September 1916. The citation read:

For most conspicuous bravery. After an advance into the enemy's trenches, he found himself isolated with a party of thirty men. He organised his defences, detailed a bombing party, and impressed on his men that his and their duty was to hold the position at all costs.

Next morning he drove off an attack by the enemy and rescued some prisoners who had fallen into their hands. Later two strong bombing attacks were beaten off. On the following day he was relieved after showing the greatest courage, determination and good leadership during 36 hours under very trying conditions.

All this time his party was without food and water, having given all their water to the wounded during the first night. After the relieving force was firmly established, he brought his party, nineteen strong, back to our trenches.

After receiving his Victoria Cross on 18 November 1916 at Buckingham Palace, from the King, he returned to the front.

=== Later service ===
In July 1917 Sanders was commissioned as a temporary Second Lieutenant in the 2nd Battalion West Yorkshire Regiment. By December 1917 Sanders was a company commander and was made an acting Captain.

In April 1918 the German Army launched the Spring Offensive. Sanders was now attached to the 1/6th Battalion, West Yorkshire Regiment who were positioned at Mount Kemmel. Heavy fighting ensued and acting Captain Sanders was awarded the Military Cross, the award of which was posted in the London Gazette on 13 September 1918. The citation stated:

For conspicuous gallantry and devotion to duty. After the enemy had penetrated the front line, he promptly organised his men in support and effectually held up the enemy for some time, inflicting heavy casualties. He stood on top of a "pill-box" firing his revolver into the enemy at 20 yards. His splendid example of courage did much to inspire his men at a critical time.

He was taken prisoner of war (POW) on 25 April and listed as wounded and missing with injuries to both his right arm and leg, last seen carrying his revolver in his left hand. Sanders was interned at the Limburg POW camp. In July he managed to get a letter to his father telling of his capture and captivity. On 26 December Captain Sanders was sent back to England, and he was discharged in March 1919.

== Later life ==
After the war in June 1920 he attended a victory party and a Victory Cross reunion dinner on the tenth anniversary of the end of the war in November 1929, both at Buckingham Palace.

Sanders unveiled the Leeds Rifles War Memorial at Leeds Minster on Remembrance Sunday 1921.

George Sanders VC MC died in Leeds on 4 April 1950 aged 55. His funeral was held at the Cottingley Crematorium in the city.

== Medals ==
His medal group, including his VC and MC, were sold at auction in 2017 for £240,000. It is reported that they were bought by Lord Ashcroft and will be placed on display at the Imperial War Museum.
