= The Dead (poem) =

Two poems by Rupert Brooke

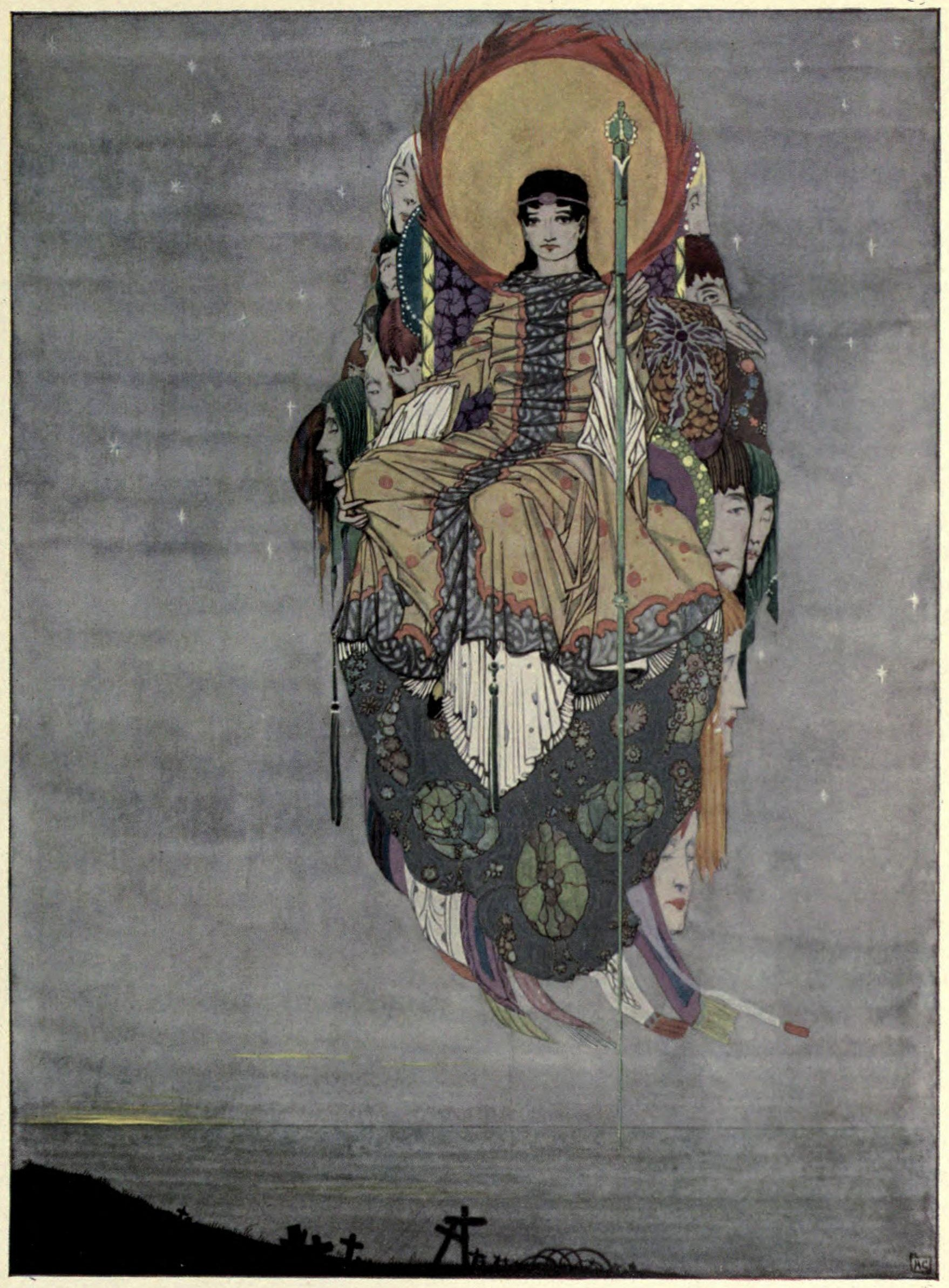
"Honour has come back, as a king, to earth," illustration by Harry Clarke in The Year's at the Spring, 1920.

The Dead is the name of two poems by the English poet Rupert Brooke, sonnets III and IV of the "1914" section of his posthumous collection 1914 and Other Poems (1915).

== 1914 and Other Poems ==
The section titled "1914" in 1914 and Other Poems contains five numbered sonnets, "I. Peace", "II. Safety", "III. The Dead", "IV. The Dead", "V. The Soldier", plus an unnumbered sonnet, "The Treasure". Brooke began working on these poems in the autumn of 1914, after returning from Tahiti to the UK and after the outbreak of the First World War. He finished them in early 1915. The poems were first published in the January 1915 edition of New Numbers and sonnets IV and V were published in The TLS in March 1915, with a review of all five by Walter de la Mare, before 1914 and Other Poems was published in May 1915. "The Soldier" is one of his most famous poems, but "IV. The Dead" was one of his personal favourites.

== III: The Dead ==
Blow out, you bugles, over the rich Dead!
There's none of these so lonely and poor of old,
But, dying, has made us rarer gifts than gold.
These laid the world away; poured out the red
Sweet wine of youth; gave up the years to be
Of work and joy, and that unhoped serene,
That men call age; and those who would have been.
Their sons, they gave, their immortality.

Blow, bugles, blow! They brought us, for our dearth.
Holiness, lacked so long, and Love, and Pain.
Honour has come back, as a king, to earth,
And paid his subjects with a royal wage;
And Nobleness walks in our ways again;
And we have come into our heritage.

== IV: The Dead ==
These hearts were woven of human joys and cares,
Washed marvellously with sorrow, swift to mirth.
The years had given them kindness. Dawn was theirs,
And sunset, and the colours of the earth.
These had seen movement, and heard music; known
Slumber and waking; loved; gone proudly friended;
Felt the quick stir of wonder; sat alone;
Touched flowers and furs and cheeks. All this is ended.

There are waters blown by changing winds to laughter
And lit by the rich skies, all day. And after,
Frost, with a gesture, stays the waves that dance
And wandering loveliness. He leaves a white
Unbroken glory, a gathered radiance,
A width, a shining peace, under the night.

== Usage ==
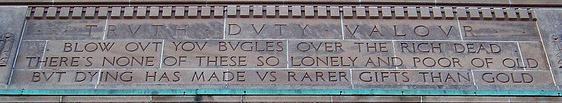
Inscription on the memorial arch at the Royal Military College of Canada.

The first three lines of the third poem appear engraved on the Memorial arch located at the entrance to the Royal Military College of Canada which commemorated the fallen ex-cadets from World War I onwards. The first eight lines of the third poem appear on Royal Naval Division War Memorial.

Lines 4-8 of the third poem appear on the Cenotaph in Wellington, New Zealand.

Lines 5-6 of the fourth poem appear on the inside walls of the 12-sided shrine, in the Memorial Garden of City Hall, Hong Kong. The shrine and garden were built in memory of the soldiers and citizens who died in defence of Hong Kong in the Second World War.
