= John Schofield (VC) =

English Victoria Cross recipient (1892-1918)

- Born: 4 March 1892; Blackburn, Lancashire, England
- Died: 9 April 1918 (aged 26); Givenchy, France
- Burial place: Vieille-Chapelle New Military Cemetery, Lacouture, France
- Military career
- Allegiance: United Kingdom
- Branch: British Army
- Rank: Second Lieutenant
- Units: Army Service Corps; Lancashire Fusiliers
- Conflicts: World War I †
- Awards: Victoria Cross

Second Lieutenant John Schofield VC (4 March 1892 – 9 April 1918) was an English recipient of the Victoria Cross, the highest and most prestigious award for gallantry in the face of the enemy that can be awarded to British and Commonwealth forces.

Before joining up, he attended Arnold School in Blackpool. Numerous memorials to his actions during the war can be found in the school's foyer and a plaque commemorating his VC can be found outside the school's memorial hall, inside of which the names of all the fallen old boys can be found.

He was 26 years old, and a temporary second lieutenant in the 2/5th Battalion, Lancashire Fusiliers, British Army during the First World War when the following deed took place for which he was awarded the VC.

On 9 April 1918 at Givenchy, France, Second Lieutenant Schofield led a party of nine men against a strong-point and was attacked by about 100 of the enemy, but his skillful use of men and weapons resulted in the taking of 20 prisoners. This officer, having made his party up to ten, then proceeded towards the front line, where he met large numbers of the enemy, on whom his party opened fire. He climbed on the parapet under point-blank machine-gun fire and by his fearless demeanor forced the enemy to surrender. As a result 123 of them, including several officers, were captured. He himself was killed a few minutes later.

His Victoria Cross is displayed at the Fusilier Museum, Bury, England.
