= Fusilier Museum =

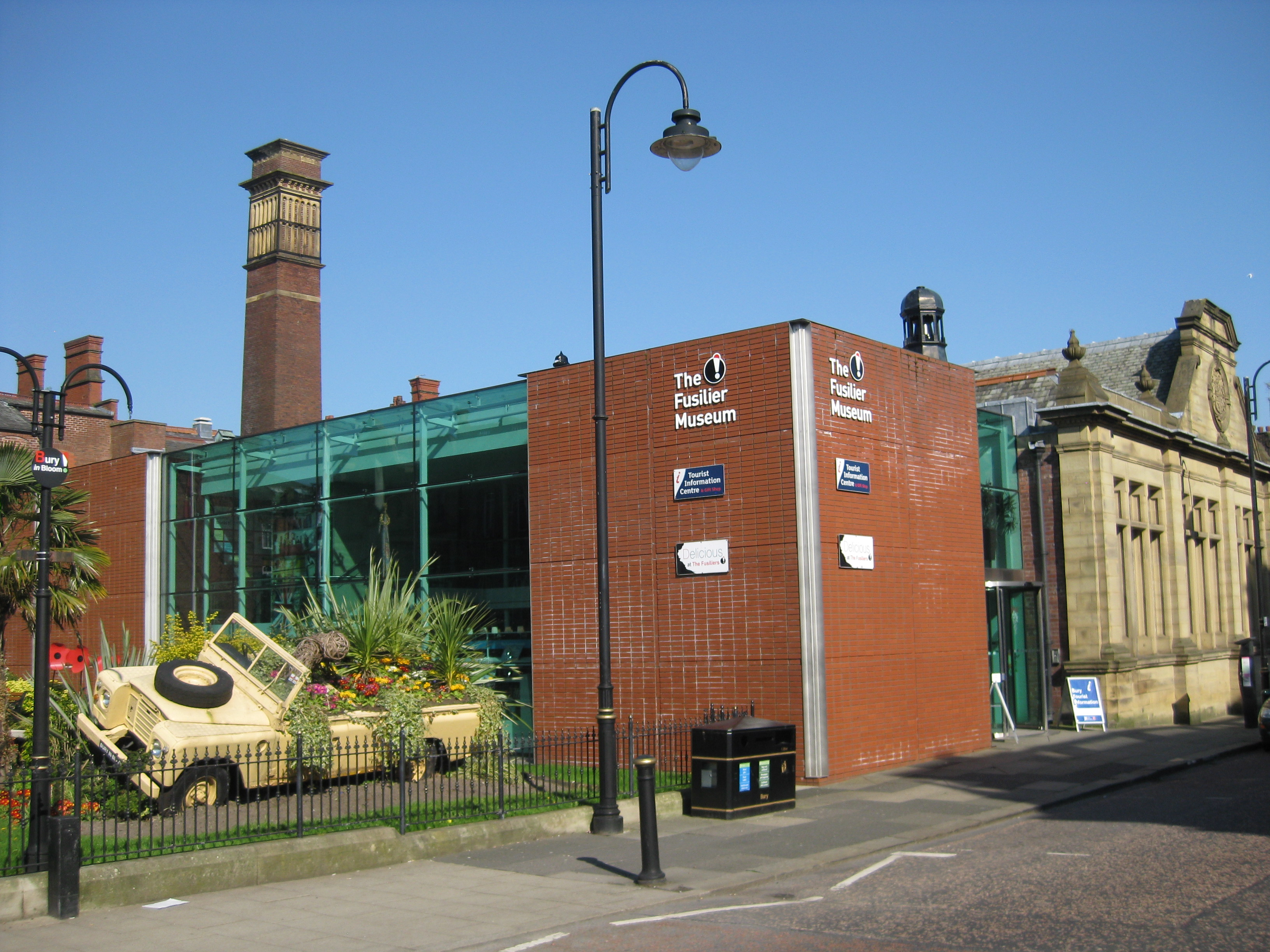
- The Fusilier Museum main entrance

- Location of the Fusilier Museum within Greater Manchester
- Established: 2009
- Location: Moss Street, Bury
- Coordinates: 53.591982°N 2.298412°W
- Type: War museum
- Public transit access: Bury Interchange
- Website: www.fusiliermuseum.com

The Fusilier Museum is a museum in Bury, Greater Manchester, England. Its collection includes the uniforms, medal and artefacts of the Lancashire Fusiliers.

== History ==
The Fusilier Museum was originally housed in the Wellington Barracks on Bolton Road. In 2009, the museum moved into the former Bury Arts and Crafts Centre building on Broad Street, which had closed in December 2004 after 110 years on the site.

The new museum was officially opened by the Duke of Kent on 25 September 2009.

The Lancashire Fusiliers Regiment ceased to exist in 1968 after it was amalgamated into the Royal Regiment of Fusiliers along with three other Regiments. Thus the museum is part of a family of other Fusilier museums: the Fusiliers Museum of Northumberland in Alnwick Castle, the Royal Regiment of Fusiliers Museum (Royal Warwickshire) in Warwick and the Fusiliers Museum (London) at the Tower of London.

== Architecture ==
The building was originally designed as a Technical School for Bury Borough Council by local architect Joshua Cartwright in the Neo-Renaissance style, and completed in 1893. It was built on land acquired from Frederick Stanley, 16th Earl of Derby. The frontage bears the inscription "Technical School" and is decorated with a frieze of five panels, each containing five sculpted relief figures representing the crafts and skills that were taught at the school, including mathematics, science, engineering, printing, pottery, literature and music. The figures were sculpted by John Jarvis Millson and J.R. Whittick.

In the 1940s, the Technical School was reorganised as the School of Arts and Crafts, and later the Arts and Crafts Centre. It is now a Grade II listed building.

== Collection ==
The museum houses the collection of the Lancashire Fusiliers, commemorating over three hundred years of the regiment's history. Beside the museum stands the Gallipoli Garden and the Grade II*-listed Lancashire Fusiliers War Memorial.

=== Victoria Crosses held by the museum ===
The museum holds the Victoria Crosses awarded to the following members of the regiment:

- Sergeant Harold John Colley, 10th Battalion, Lancashire Fusiliers (First World War)
- Lance Sergeant William Kenealy, 1st Battalion, Lancashire Fusiliers (First World War)
- Private John Lynn, 2nd Battalion, Lancashire Fusiliers (First World War)
- Second Lieutenant John Schofield, 5th Battalion, Lancashire Fusiliers (First World War)
- Sergeant Frank Edward Stubbs, 1st Battalion, Lancashire Fusiliers (First World War)

== Gallery ==
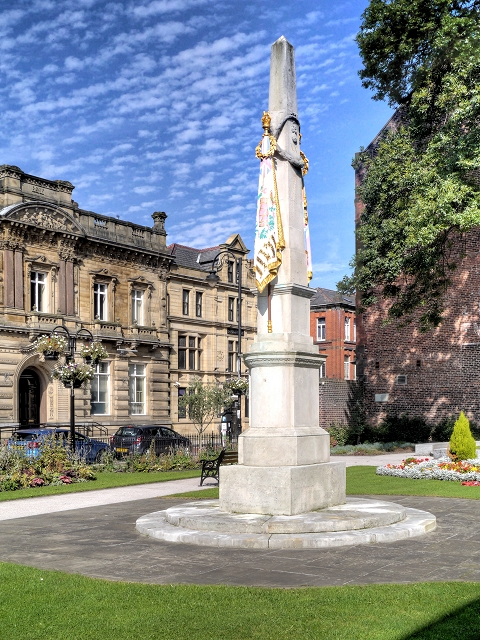
Lancashire Fusiliers Memorial

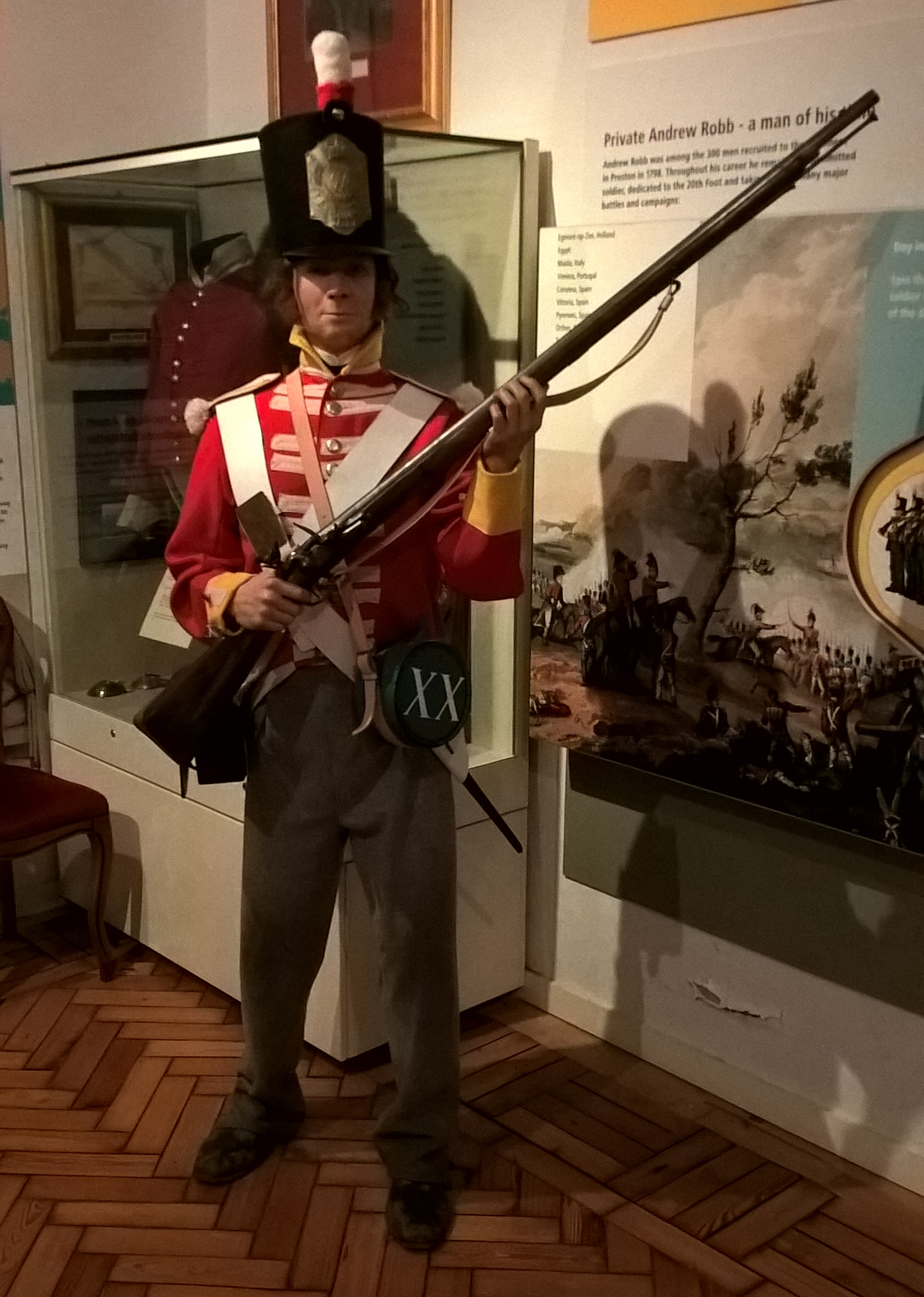
Pte Andrew Robb of the XXth Foot

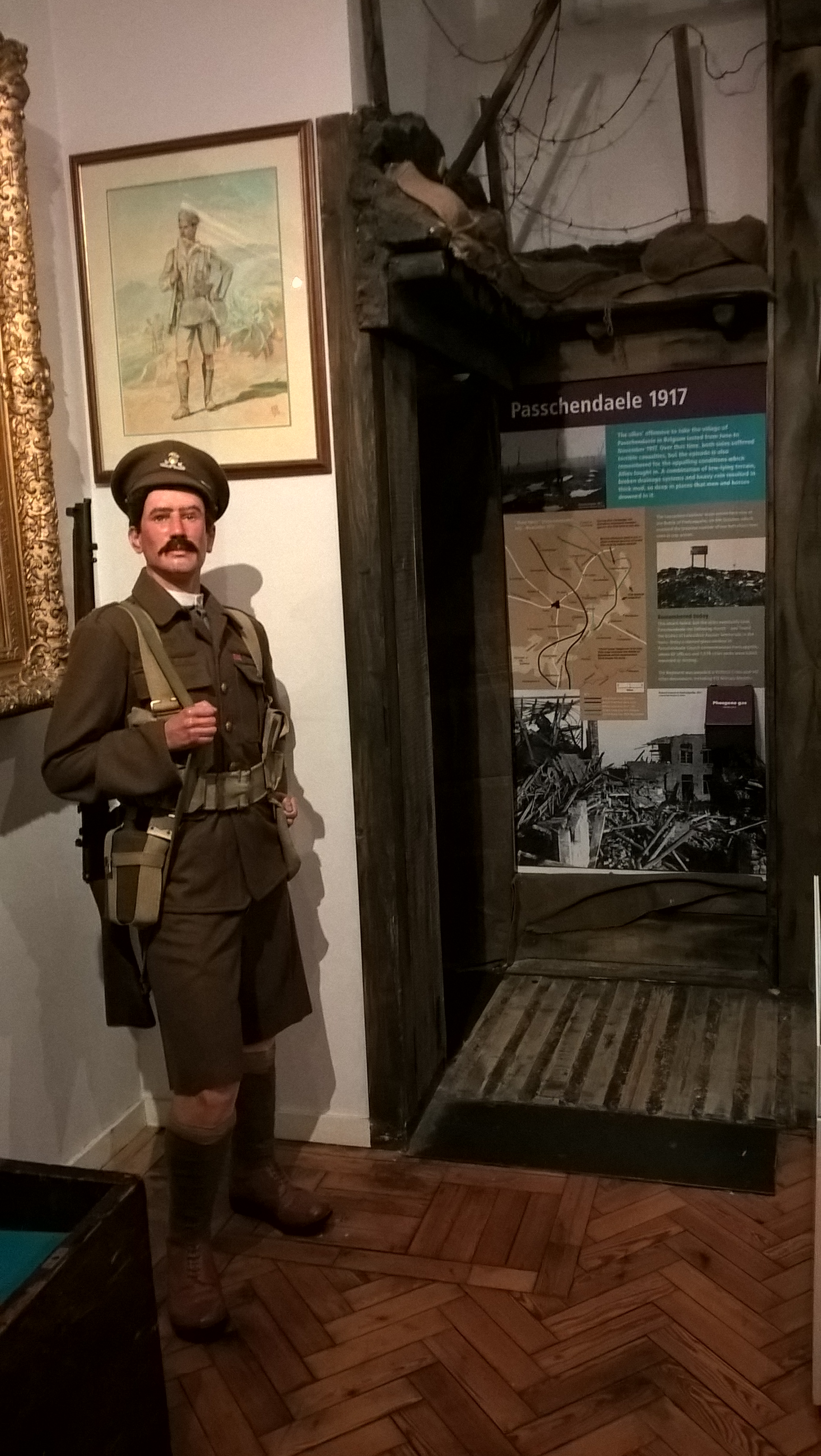
Part of WW1 display

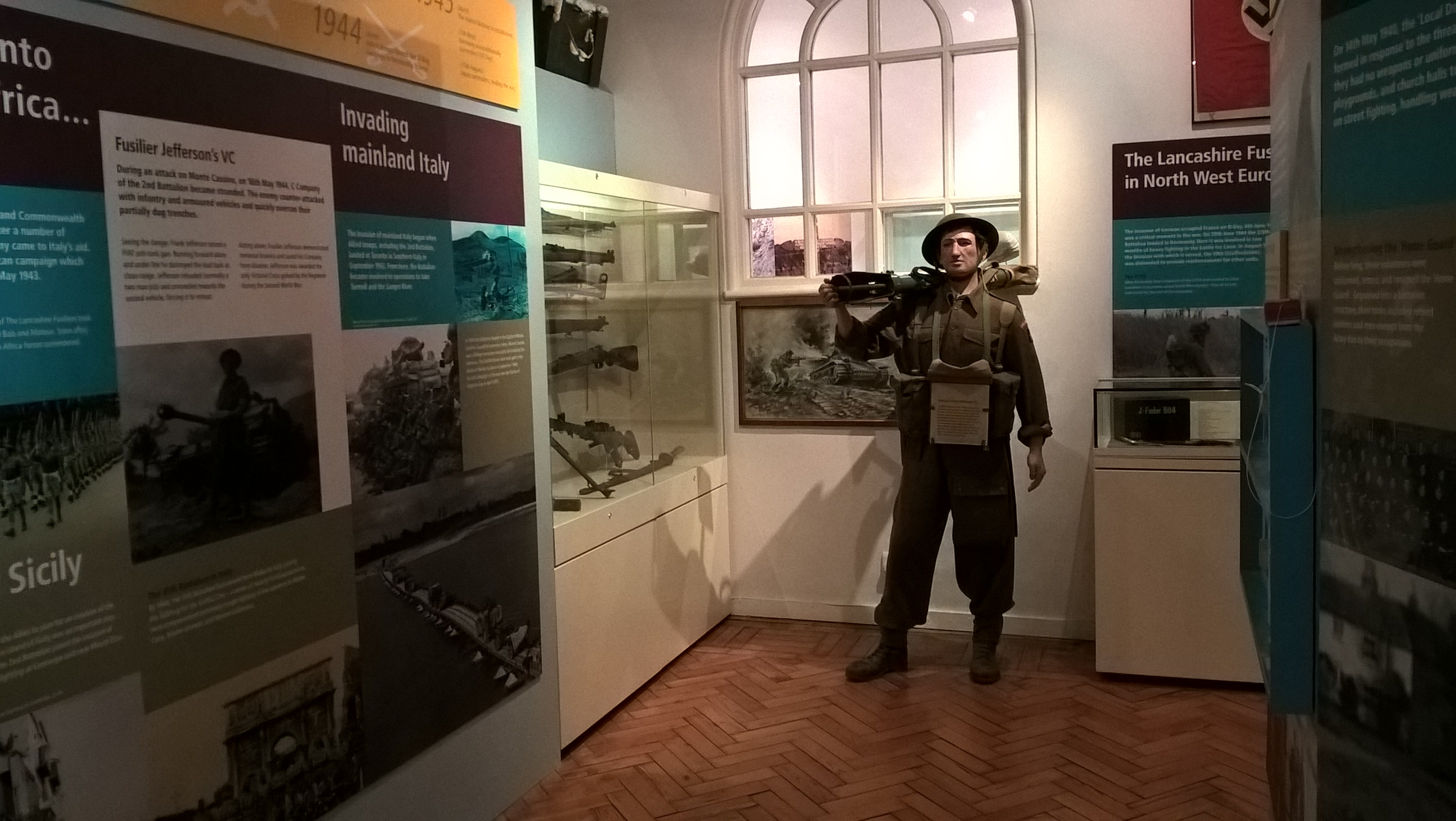
Part of WW2 Display: Arthur Jefferson, VC

== See also ==
- List of museums in Greater Manchester
