= Bullingdon Green =

Former cricket ground in Oxford, England

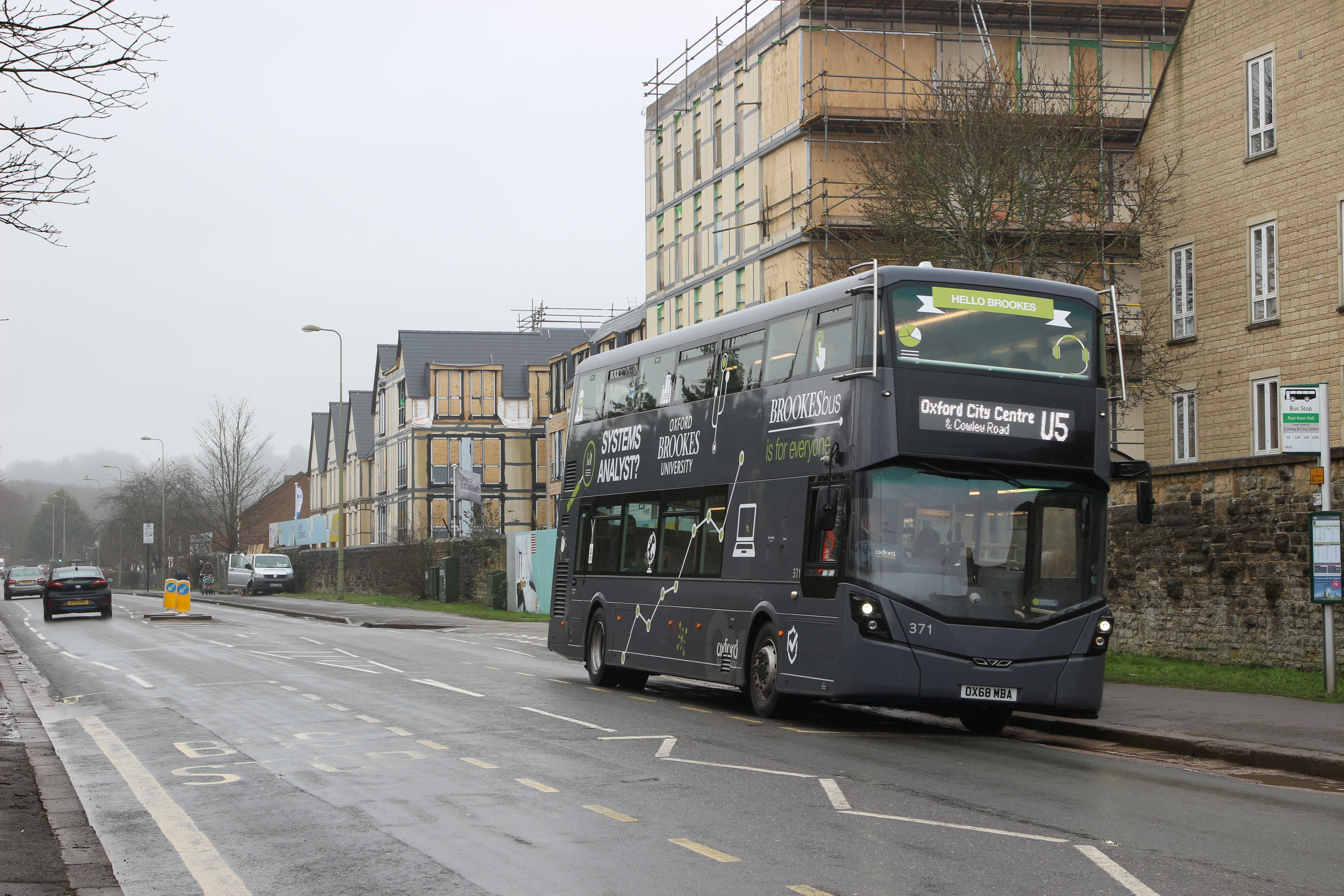
- A modern day view of where the ground was located
- Interactive map of Bullingdon Green

Ground information
- Location: Oxford, Oxfordshire
- Country: England
- Coordinates: 51.7417°N 1.2024°W
- Establishment: c. 1764

Team information
Oxford University	(1843)
- As of 17 August 2010; Source: Ground profile

Bullingdon Green was a cricket ground south of Oxford, England. It was associated with the Bullingdon Club and was an important site in the early history of cricket in Oxford. The ground operated as a first-class cricket venue in 1843, hosting two first-class matches. It was subsequently built on in 1876 with the Cowley Barracks.

== History ==
The "large open space" of Bullingdon Green formerly stood between Horspath and Cowley. Cricket is recorded as being played at Bullingdon Green as early as 1764. The ground was located 2 miles (3.2 km) from the centre of Oxford, with players and spectators alike reaching it by horseback, which was described by Thomas Case in Ranjitsinhji's 1897 Jubilee Book of Cricket. The Bullingdon Club played minor matches at the ground at the beginning of the 19th century, however cricket at the ground was often secondary to dinners and equestrian pursuits. By the 1820s, it had developed a reputation for hosting unsupervised social gatherings, with R. W. Browne commenting that "the Magdalen [Club] was the only real University Cricket Club, as the Bullingdon was more of a fashionable lounge for those who could keep horses." The distance from Oxford and a serious need to focus on cricket necessitated the requirement for a cricket ground closer to the city, with the establishment of the Magdalen Ground in 1829, which was leased to the Oxford University Cricket Club.

Bullingdon Green would go on to host first-class cricket for Oxford University in 1843, due to flooding at the Magdalen Ground. The first fixture which was moved to the ground was that seasons 'grand match' against the Marylebone Cricket Club, while the second was The University Match against Cambridge University. Frederick Lillywhite was of the opinion that the turf at Bullingdon Green was the finest he had ever played on, even finer than the turf at his own ground in Brighton. The ground remained in use until the 1870s, at which point the Cardwell Reforms which encouraged the localisation of British military forces were set in motion. In 1873, early inspections took place for the creation of a military centre on Bullingdon Green. The location of the cricket ground was subsequently chosen for the construction of the Cowley Barracks, which were completed in 1876.

== Records ==
=== First-class ===
- Highest team total: 141 all out by Cambridge University v Oxford University, 1843
- Lowest team total: 44 all out by Oxford University v Marylebone Cricket Club, 1843
- Highest individual innings: 44 by Francis Grimston for Cambridge University v Oxford University, 1843
- Best bowling in an innings: 7-? by Henry Moberly for Oxford University v Marylebone Cricket Club, 1843
- Best bowling in a match: 14-? by Henry Moberly, as above
