= Royal Naval Division War Memorial =

War memorial in London

Royal Naval Division Memorial
- United Kingdom
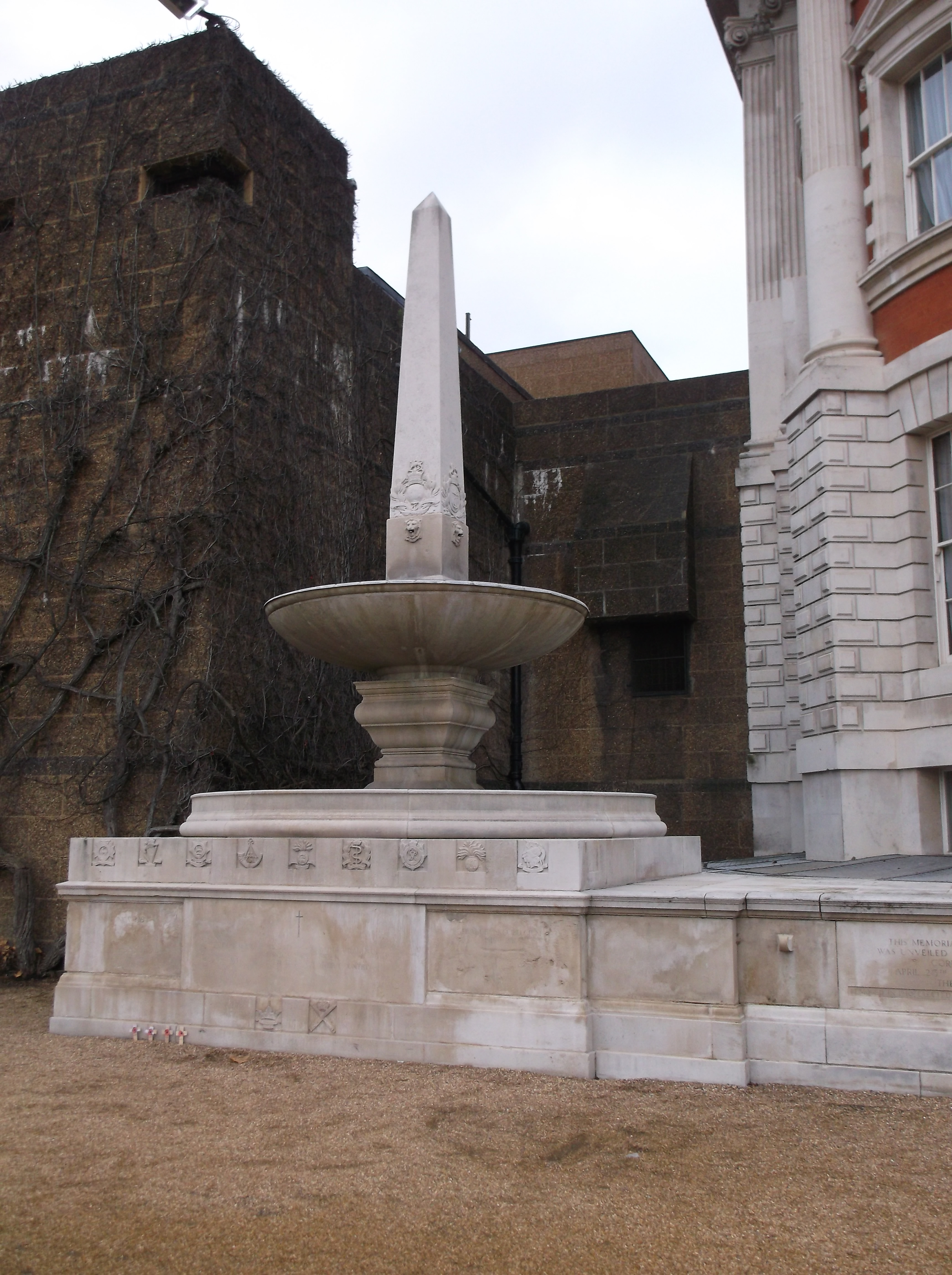
- For members of the 63rd (Royal Naval) Division killed in the First World War
- Unveiled: 25 April 1925
- Location: 51.505348°N 0.129056°W; Horse Guards Parade, London
- Designed by: Sir Edwin Lutyens
- IN MEMORY OF THE OFFICERS AND OTHER RANKS OF THE ROYAL NAVAL DIVISION WHO GAVE THEIR LIVES FOR THEIR COUNTRY

Listed Building – Grade II*
- Official name: The Royal Naval Division Memorial
- Designated: 6 March 2008
- Reference no.: 1392454

The Royal Naval Division Memorial is a First World War memorial located on Horse Guards Parade in central London, and dedicated to members of the 63rd (Royal Naval) Division (RND) killed in that conflict. Sir Edwin Lutyens designed the memorial, which was unveiled on 25 April 1925—ten years to the day after the Gallipoli landings, in which the division suffered heavy casualties. Shortly after the war, former members of the division established a committee, chaired by one of their leading officers, Brigadier-General Arthur Asquith, to raise funds for a memorial. Progress was initially slow. The committee planned to incorporate its memorial into a larger monument proposed by the Royal Navy for Trafalgar Square. When the navy abandoned that project, the RND's committee decided to proceed independently. They engaged Lutyens, who, after negotiation with the Office of Works, produced a design for a fountain connected to the balustrade of the Admiralty Extension building.

Lutyens' obelisk rises from a bowl, with water spouts projecting from sculpted lion heads at its base. The bowl is connected to a second, shallower basin by a decorative plinth. The base contains relief carvings of the insignia of units attached to the RND. As well as various dedicatory inscriptions, the base contains the division's battle honours and an excerpt from the poem III: The Dead by Rupert Brooke, who died of disease while serving in the division in 1915. The memorial was unveiled on 25 April 1925 by Major-General Sir Archibald Paris, the division's first commanding officer. Winston Churchill, the division's creator, gave a rousing speech praising Lutyens' design and the RND's record of distinguished service.

The memorial was dismantled and placed in storage in 1939 to allow the construction of the Admiralty Citadel in the Second World War. It was re-erected in 1951, in the grounds of the Royal Naval College in Greenwich. When the college closed in the late 1990s, a campaign was established to move the memorial back to its original location, where it was unveiled in 2003; Churchill's grandson read out his grandfather's speech from the original ceremony. The memorial was designated a grade II listed building in 2008 and upgraded to grade II* in 2015, when Historic England declared Lutyens' war memorials a national collection.

== Background ==
In the aftermath of the First World War and its unprecedented casualties, thousands of war memorials were built across Britain. Amongst the most prominent designers of memorials was Sir Edwin Lutyens, described by Historic England as "the leading English architect of his generation". Lutyens established his reputation designing country houses for wealthy clients, but the war had a profound effect on him; following it, he devoted much of his time to memorialising its casualties. He became renowned for his commemorative works through his design for The Cenotaph on Whitehall, which became Britain's national war memorial. This, along with his work for the Imperial War Graves Commission, led to commissions for war memorials across Britain and the empire. As well as memorials for towns and cities, Lutyens was commissioned to design memorials for several private companies and military units. These were among the least controversial of Lutyens' war memorials as sites and funds tended to be readily available.

The Royal Naval Division (RND) was a land-based formation under the command of the Admiralty. It was created by Winston Churchill, the First Lord of the Admiralty (the government minister responsible for the Royal Navy), in 1914 by grouping together sailors, Royal Marines, and naval and marine reservists who were surplus to the Admiralty's sea-faring needs. The division was required to provide almost all of its own officers upon formation, several of whom were drawn from the literary and artistic contacts of Churchill's private secretary, Edward Marsh. Although it fought on land, the division was known for its strong maritime traditions, including the use of naval ranks and terminology. The division's first engagements of the war were in Belgium at the end of 1914, attempting to defend the port cities of Ostend and Antwerp. The following year, the RND, alongside the 29th Division, formed the British contingent of the initial invasion force for the Gallipoli Campaign—an ultimately doomed invasion of Turkey which the Allies hoped would knock the Ottoman Empire out of the war. After suffering heavy casualties at Gallipoli, the division was evacuated in 1916, reorganised, and transferred to the command of the British Army, where it became the 63rd (Royal Naval) Division. As part of the reorganisation, the division's commanding officer, Major-General Archibald Paris (a Royal Marine), was replaced with an army officer, Major-General Cameron Shute, and several army units were attached to compensate for the division's losses at Gallipoli, though it retained its maritime character. It was sent to the Western Front as an infantry division in late 1916, where it remained until the armistice in 1918. The division was disbanded in June 1919 at a ceremony on Horse Guards Parade. It lost 10,737 officers and men during the war; another 30,892 were wounded.

== Commissioning ==
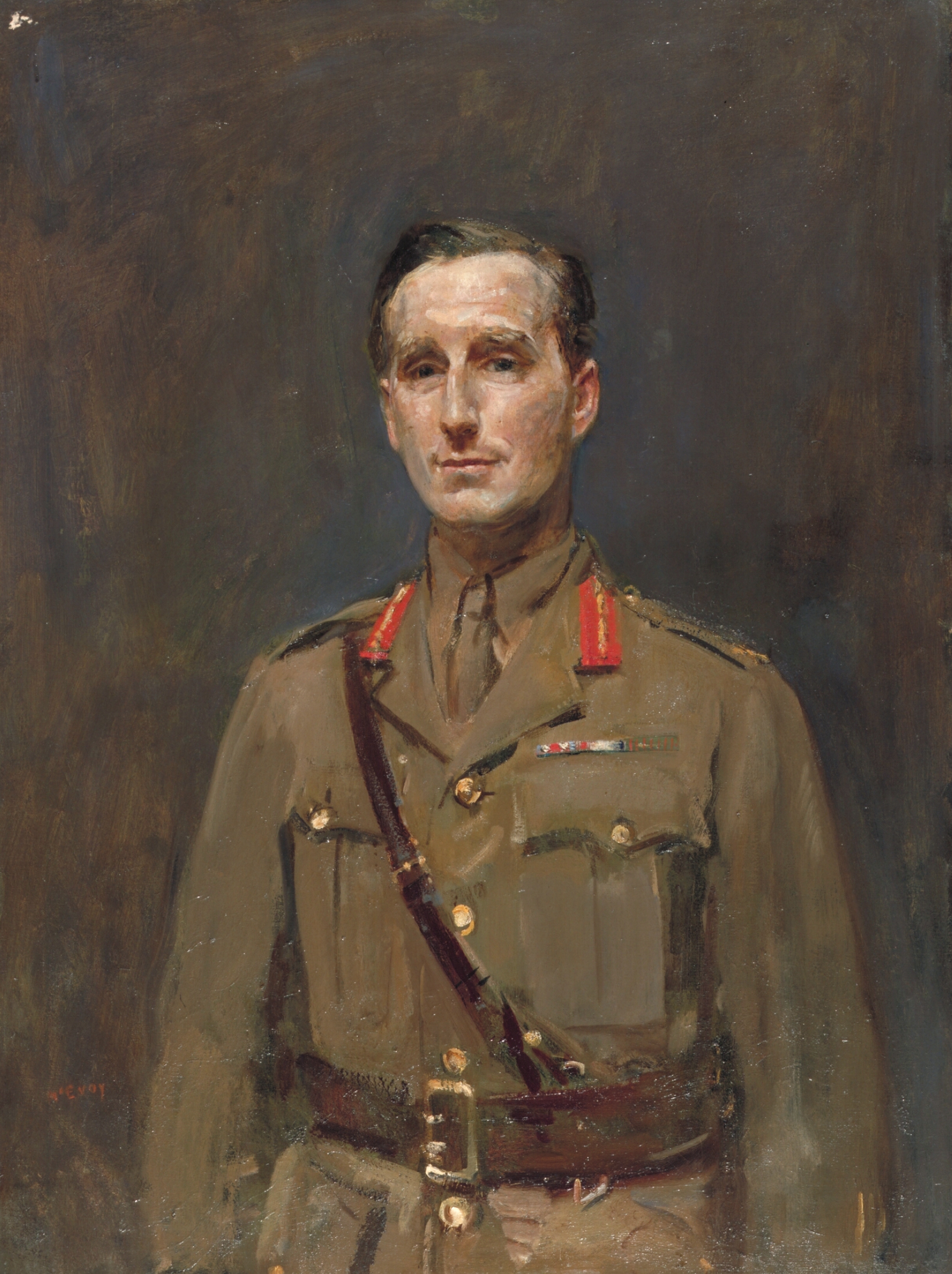
Portrait of Brigadier-General Arthur Asquith, a leading member of the Royal Naval Division and chairman of the war memorial committee

Immediately after the war, former members of the division formed a committee to explore possibilities for a memorial. The committee was chaired by one of the leading members of the RND, Brigadier-General Arthur Asquith, the son of H. H. Asquith, the British prime minister for the first half of the war. At this point, the Admiralty was considering plans for a large memorial to the Royal Navy in London's Trafalgar Square, but opted for three monuments across the south coast of England (the Plymouth, Portsmouth, and Chatham naval memorials). The RND committee was keen to have its memorial in London, and proceeded independently. The committee still hoped to have its memorial in Trafalgar Square, but the Office of Works considered that their budget of £3,000 would not produce a work suitable for such a prominent location. Sir Reginald Blomfield—a government adviser on war memorials and a prominent designer of memorials in his own right—suggested a site on the Victoria Embankment alongside the River Thames, which became home to multiple war memorials, but the committee rejected the idea. The office's permanent secretary, Sir Lionel Earle, suggested that Asquith consult Charles Sargeant Jagger with regards to the design of the memorial, though nothing appears to have resulted from the discussion.

Progress came when Asquith approached Lutyens—an introduction possibly made by Bernard Freyberg, another leading member of the division, whose wife commissioned Lutyens to design Spalding War Memorial. Lutyens began a discussion with the Office of Works about potential sites. In correspondence with Lutyens, Earle suggested a fountain at the rear of the Admiralty Extension building, though this faced St James's Park, and Earle was conscious that the building of war memorials in the royal parks had previously been controversial. Thus, he told Lutyens that the monument would have to be "a purely sylvan piece of architecture" and not obviously a war memorial. To this, Asquith's committee agreed, and Lutyens sent Earle rough drawings for a fountain in May 1924, which Earle forwarded to Sir Vincent Baddeley, the First Principal Assistant Secretary to the Admiralty. Baddeley gave provisional approval for a site on the balustrade at the south-west corner of the Admiralty Extension on 18 July; three days later King George V gave final approval for both the design and the site.

== Design ==
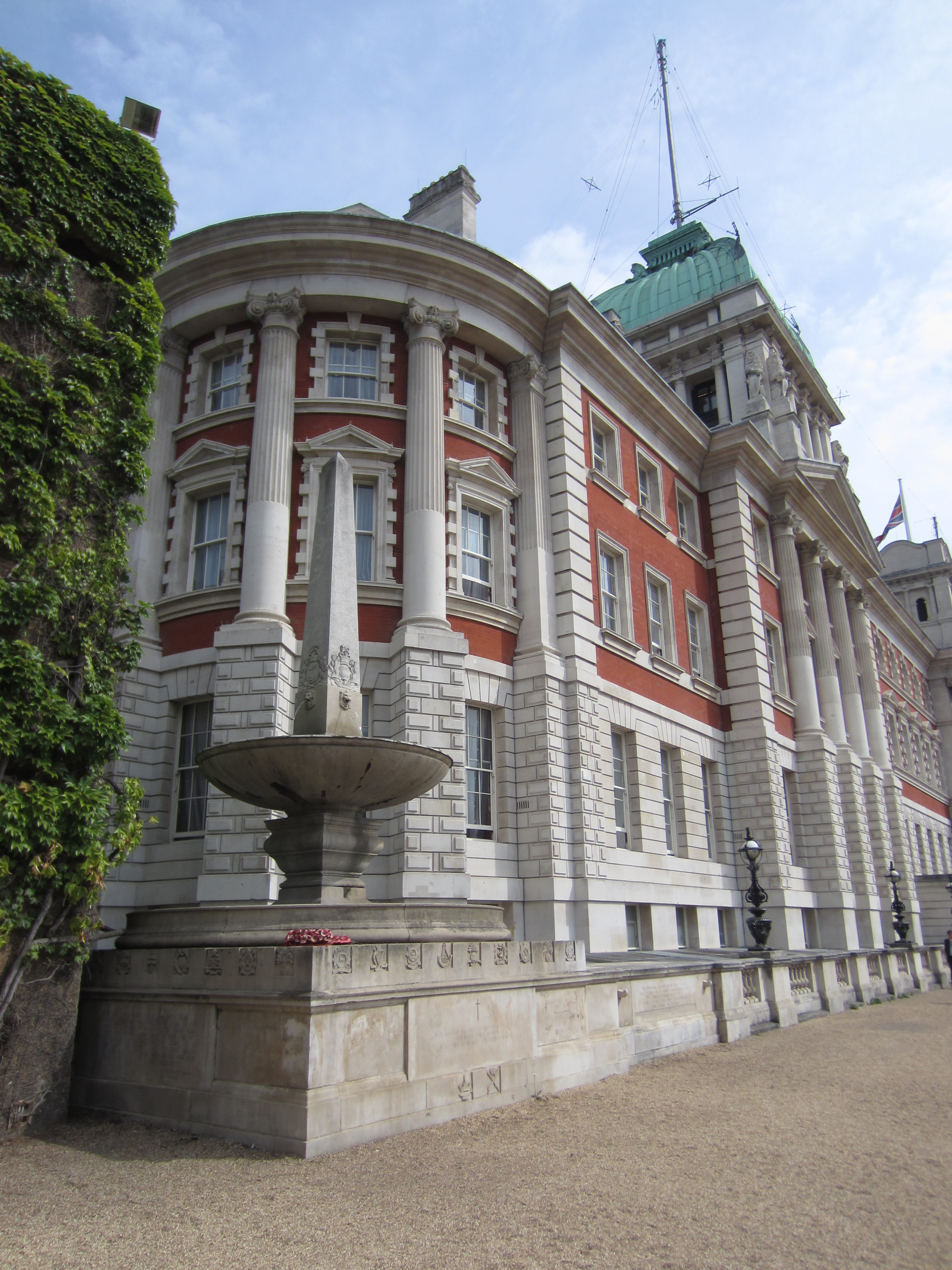
The memorial with the Admiralty Extension in the background; the ivy to the left is growing on the Admiralty Citadel.

The memorial is carved from Portland stone and consists of an obelisk rising from a circular bowl, supported by a moulded square base which connects to a second, shallower bowl and then to a large square plinth. The plinth extends from the balustrade of the former Admiralty Extension building on Horse Guards Parade, a military parade ground off Whitehall, the centre of the British government. To the rear and left of the memorial is the Admiralty Citadel, a bomb-proof command centre built during the Second World War. Relief carvings of the Royal Naval Division's insignia are located on each of the four sides of the obelisk's base. Immediately below the reliefs are sculpted lion heads, the mouths of which contain water spouts, allowing water to spill into the basin. The obelisk rises to 7.5 metres (25 feet) off the ground, while the widest part of the plinth is 4.7 metres (15 feet) across.

At the top of the plinth, on the south and west sides (front and left, respectively, when viewed from the parade ground), are reliefs of 18 cap badges of units which formed part of the division. A moulded cornice separates the top of the plinth from the lower sections. Below this, the central section is divided horizontally into three panels, the central panel projecting slightly forward. On the south side of the memorial, a cross is etched into the central panel, flanked by the start and end dates of the First World War—1914 on the left and 1918 on the right. Below is the main dedication, IN MEMORY OF THE OFFICERS AND OTHER RANKS OF THE ROYAL NAVAL DIVISION WHO GAVE THEIR LIVES FOR THEIR COUNTRY. The side panels contain battle honours: "SALONIKA 1916" on the left and "FRANCE AND BELGIUM 1916–1918" on the right. On the west side, the side panels read ANTWERP 1914 (left) and GALLIPOLI 1915–16 (right); the central panel contains a verse from the 1914 poem "III: The Dead" by Rupert Brooke, a war poet and member of the RND who died of disease while en route with the division to Gallipoli in April 1915:

Blow out, you bugles, over the rich Dead!

There's none of these so lonely and poor of old,

But, dying, has made us rarer gifts than gold.

These laid the world away; poured out the red

Sweet wine of youth; gave up the years to be

Of work and joy, and that unhoped serene,

That men call age; and those who would have been,

Their sons, they gave, their immortality.

Rupert Brooke, 1887–1915, Hood Battalion

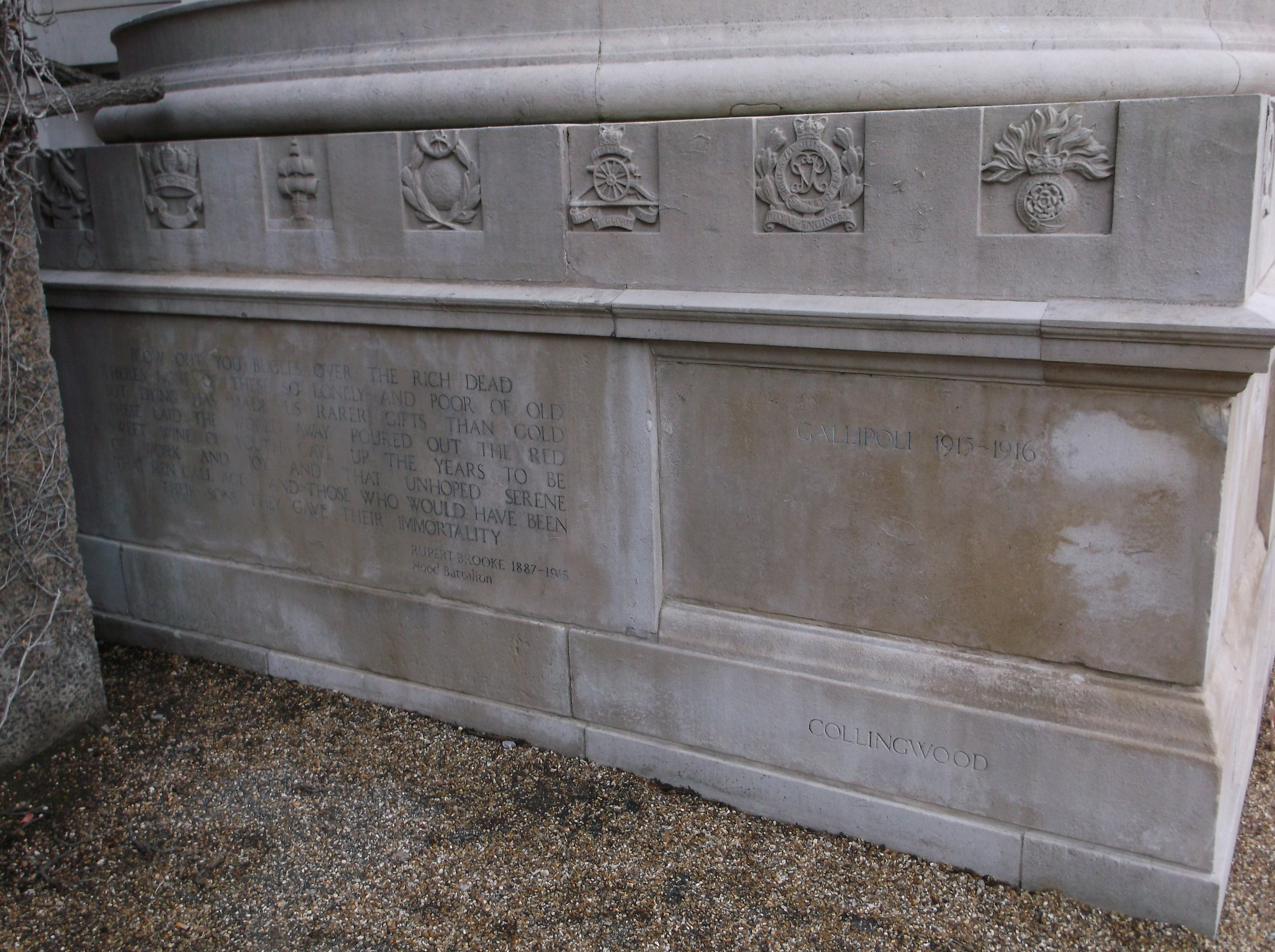
Detail of the plinth, showing the carved unit badges and the poem by Rupert Brooke

The lower section of the plinth is mostly undecorated. The front face contains two more cap badges and on the west face are inscriptions of the names of two battalions from the division: BENBOW and COLLINGWOOD. Where the plinth joins the balustrade of the Admiralty building, an inscription on a stone panel records the history of the memorial: THIS MEMORIAL DESIGNED BY SIR EDWIN LUTYENS WAS UNVEILED ON THE HORSE GUARDS PARADE AT THE CORNER OF THE ADMIRALTY ON APRIL 25TH 1925 THE TENTH ANNIVERSARY OF THE LANDING ON GALLIPOLI. REMOVED IN 1940, ERECTED IN GREENWICH IN 1951 AND REINSTATED ON THIS SITE IN 2003. The original cap badge carvings were the work of Eric Broadbent, a former army officer and previous collaborator of Lutyens', while the two on the bottom section of the front face were added in 1931 by Frederick J. Wilcoxson—recommended by Lutyens to the Office of Works—another former army officer who later worked on several other war memorials. Further additions were made in 1938 by F. G. Relph of the Kingston Masonry Works, who was also recommended by Lutyens. The RND Memorial is one of several of Lutyens' memorials to include an obelisk. Among others is his memorial to the Lancashire Fusiliers, who also fought at Gallipoli, though he used the design of an obelisk in a fountain in only one other memorial, the Irish National War Memorial Gardens in Dublin.

== History ==
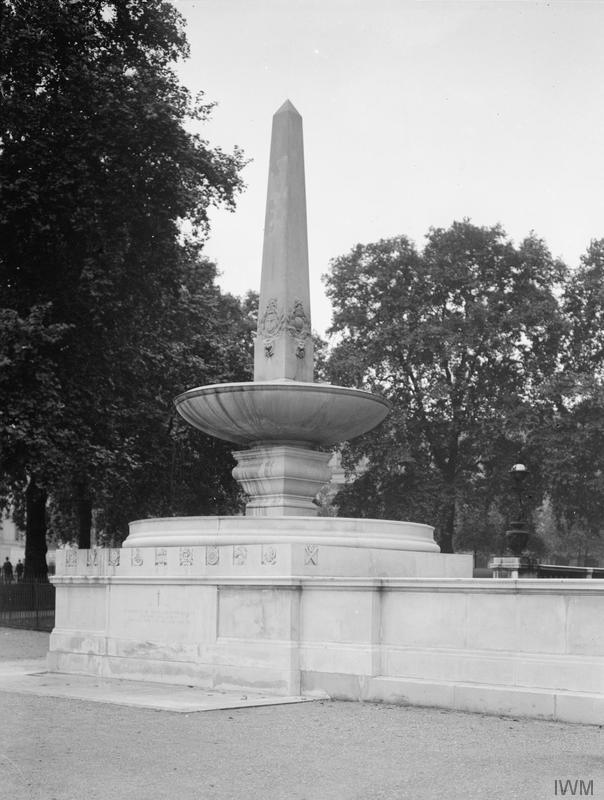
The memorial in its original position between the wars, prior to the construction of the Admiralty Citadel

The memorial was unveiled by Major-General Sir Archibald Paris, the first commander of the division, on 25 April 1925—the tenth anniversary of the Gallipoli landings. In his address, Paris described the memorial as "a permanent record of noble deeds and duty accomplished". It was dedicated by the Reverend Bevill Close, one of the division's chaplains, who was joined by a Catholic chaplain, Father Eric Green. Rupert Brooke's mother attended, along with multiple senior military officers including Asquith, Freyburg, General Sir Ian Hamilton (commander of the Gallipoli campaign), Vice-Admiral Sir Roger Keyes (who was involved in the naval element of the Gallipoli campaign), and Captain Oliver Backhouse (a brigade commander in the RND). Winston Churchill gave a rousing speech in which he referred to the division's distinguished record and its heavy losses at Gallipoli. He told the crowd that "Everyone, I think, must admire the grace and simplicity of this fountain which the genius of Lutyens has designed. The site is also well chosen. Here, under the shadow of the Admiralty Building, eleven years ago, the Royal Naval Division was called into martial service; this monument now records their fame and preserves their memory. Their memory is thus linked forever with the Royal Navy, whose child they were, of whose traditions they were so proud." He described the "high calm peace" of Rupert Brooke's poetry, inscribed on the memorial, rising "confidently above the tumult and carnage, and above all error and confusion" and concluded that "this fountain will give forth not only the waters of honour, but the waters of healing and the waters of hope". The service concluded with the national anthem, God Save the King.

The initial cost of the memorial was met entirely by private subscriptions, largely from former members of the division or the families of those killed while serving in it. By far the largest contributor was Lord Rothermere—owner of the Daily Mail newspaper—whose second son, Vere Harmsworth, was killed in action with the division at the Battle of the Ancre in 1916. HM Treasury authorised the Office of Works to see to the ongoing maintenance of the fountain, to which the RND Association contributed through a trust fund established with surplus donations, chaired by Arthur Asquith and now in the hands of the Commandant General Royal Marines. The fund also covered the construction of a memorial to the RND near Beaucourt-sur-l'Ancre in France, which takes the form of a truncated stone obelisk.

Within a year of the unveiling of the fountain, problems were discovered with the structure; the bowl was not perfectly horizontal, meaning that water cascaded over only one side, spoiling the effect, while the ground beneath became waterlogged. The RND Association paid for repairs, including paving the ground next to the memorial. By 1928 it was apparent that the association's ongoing contribution was insufficient; the Office of Works eventually, though grudgingly, agreed to cover the cost of any further repairs as well as routine maintenance.

The memorial remained in situ until 1939, when work began on the Admiralty Citadel and the memorial was dismantled and put into storage to avoid damage during the Second World War. It was held first in the yard of the stone masonry firm Holloway Brothers in Nine Elms (along with several other central London monuments moved for safekeeping) and later in the grounds of the Royal Hospital Chelsea. Following the end of that war in 1945, the RND Association lobbied heavily for the prompt re-erection of its memorial. The Ministry of Works (successor to the Office of Works) decided that the fountain could not be reinstalled in its original location and began exploring alternative sites. After considering and rejecting multiple sites, and following further pressure from the RND Association, the ministry agreed in 1949 to reassemble the memorial in the grounds of the Royal Naval College in Greenwich, south-east London. It was finally re-erected outside the Queen Anne Building, where it was unveiled by the Second Sea Lord, Vice Admiral Alexander Madden (standing in for the First Sea Lord, Admiral Lord Fraser) on 26 May 1951.

The former members of the division had mixed feelings about the location. It lacked the prominence and visibility of a central London location, but provided a convenient focal point for gatherings of former members, which took place regularly until 1981. When the closure of the college was proposed in the late 1990s, Captain Christopher Page—a retired Royal Navy officer and military historian with a particular interest in the Royal Naval Division—instigated a campaign to have the memorial restored to its original location on Horse Guards Parade. A fund was established to cover the cost of the move, and all funds and permissions were in place in early 2003. After restoration work by the stonemason David Ball, under the direction of Trehearne Architects, it was re-installed there on 13 November 2003, the anniversary of the division's attack at Beaucourt-sur-l'Ancre during the Battle of the Somme in 1916. Prince Charles performed the unveiling in the presence of Prince Michael of Kent (honorary commodore of the Royal Navy Volunteer Reserve), Admiral Sir Alan West (First Sea Lord), and the Reverend Barry Hammett (Chaplain of the Fleet). Churchill's grandson (also called Winston Churchill) read out the speech his grandfather gave at the original ceremony in 1925.

The memorial was designated a grade II listed building in 2008. Listed status provides legal protection from demolition or modification; grade II is applied to buildings of "special interest, warranting every effort to preserve them". It was upgraded to grade II* (reserved for "particularly important buildings of more than special interest" and applied to about 5.5% of listings) in November 2015, when Historic England deemed Lutyens' war memorials a national collection as part of commemorations for the centenary of the First World War.

== See also ==
- Grade II* listed buildings in the City of Westminster (A–Z)
- Grade II* listed war memorials in England
