= Lancashire Fusiliers War Memorial =

War memorial in Greater Manchester, England

- England
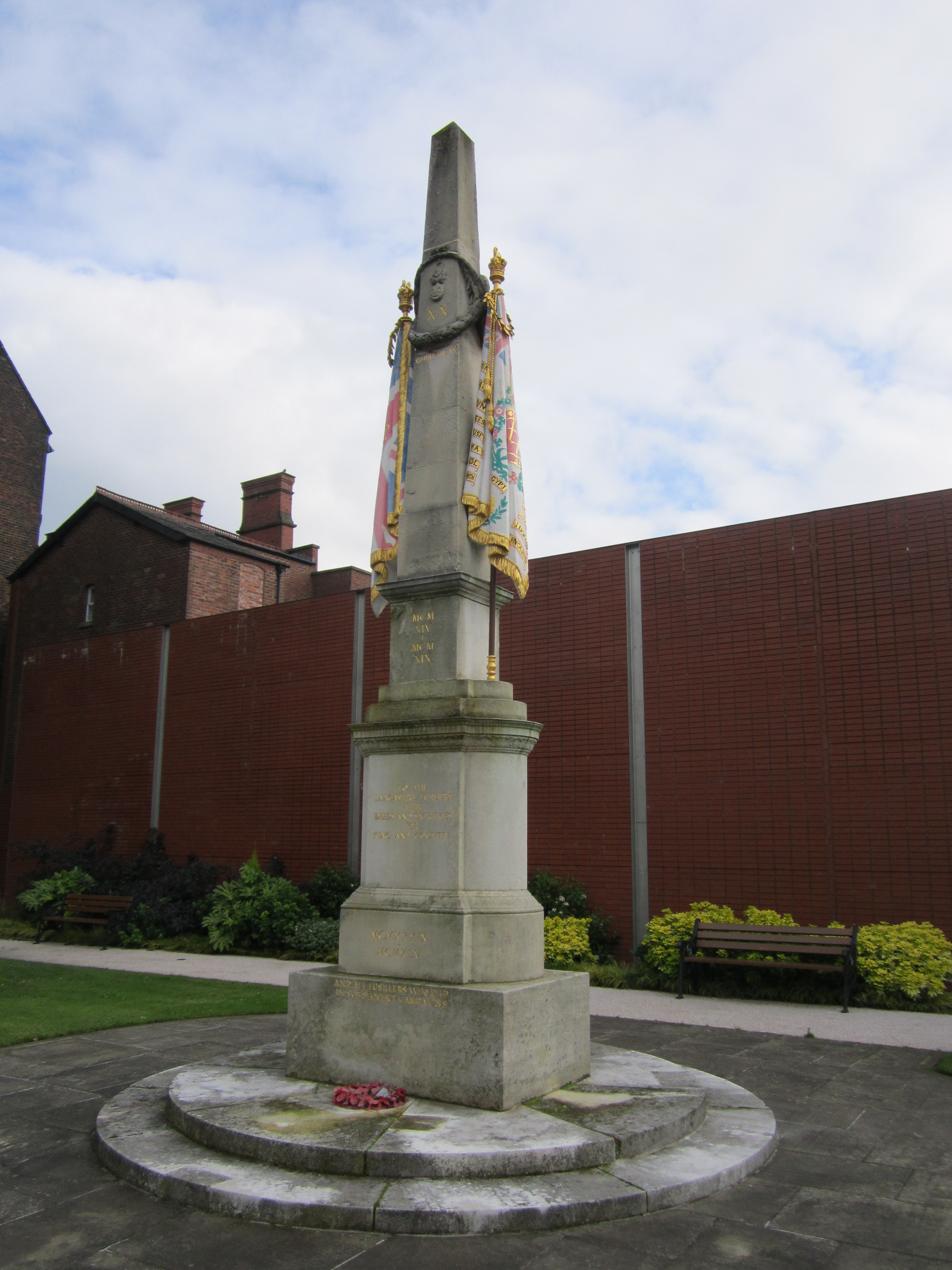
- For men of the Lancashire Fusiliers killed in the First World War
- Unveiled: 25 April 1922
- Location: 53.59226°N 2.29872°W; Gallipoli Gardens, Bury, Greater Manchester, England
- Designed by: Sir Edwin Lutyens

Listed Building – Grade II*
- Official name: War Memorial to the Lancashire Fusiliers, Gallipoli Gardens
- Designated: 2 September 1992
- Reference no.: 1250814

The Lancashire Fusiliers War Memorial is a First World War memorial dedicated to members of the Lancashire Fusiliers killed in that conflict. Outside the Fusilier Museum in Bury, Greater Manchester, England, it was unveiled in 1922—on the seventh anniversary of the landing at Cape Helles, part of the Gallipoli Campaign in which the regiment suffered particularly heavy casualties. The memorial was designed by Sir Edwin Lutyens. He was commissioned in light of a family connection—his father and great uncle were officers in the Lancashire Fusiliers, a fact noted on a plaque nearby. He designed a tall, slender obelisk in Portland stone. The regiment's cap badge is carved near the top on the front and rear, surrounded by a laurel wreath. Further down are inscriptions containing the regiment's motto and a dedication. Two painted stone flags hang from the sides.

The memorial was unveiled by Lieutenant General Sir Henry de Beauvoir De Lisle on 25 April 1922, using the novel method of pressing an electric button. The remaining funds were spent on drums and bugles for the regiment and donated to the Lancashire Fusiliers' compassionate fund. After the Lancashire Fusiliers were amalgamated into the Royal Regiment of Fusiliers in 1968, the memorial was adopted by the new regiment and rededicated to all fusiliers killed in action. It originally sat outside the Lancashire Fusiliers' headquarters in Wellington Barracks but was relocated when the barracks closed in the 1970s. It was moved again in 2009, this time to sit in a public park renamed Gallipoli Gardens, outside the Fusilier Museum, which moved at the same time. The memorial was designated a Grade II listed building in 1992. It was upgraded to Grade II* in 2015 (on the centenary of the Cape Helles landing), along with two other memorials related to the Gallipoli Campaign; later that year it was recognised as part of a national collection of Lutyens' war memorials.

== Background ==
In the aftermath of the First World War and its unprecedented casualties, thousands of war memorials were built across Britain. Amongst the most prominent designers of memorials was the architect Sir Edwin Lutyens, described by Historic England as "the leading English architect of his generation". Lutyens established his reputation designing country houses for wealthy clients. After the war, which had a profound effect on him, he devoted much of his time to memorialising its casualties. He became a public figure through his design for The Cenotaph on Whitehall in London, which became Britain's national memorial. This, along with his work for the Imperial War Graves Commission, led to commissions for war memorials across Britain and the empire. As well as memorials for towns and cities, Lutyens was commissioned to design memorials for several private companies and regimental associations, including the Lancashire Fusiliers. These tended to be the least controversial of Lutyens' war memorials—a site was readily available (in this case the regiment's home barracks) and fundraising was straightforward.

Lutyens' father was Captain Charles Henry Augustus Lutyens (1829–1915), formerly an officer in the Lancashire Fusiliers. Captain Lutyens, himself the son of an army officer, spent most of his military career in Canada; he served during the time of the Crimean War but spent it as a musketry instructor in Hythe, Alberta. The architect's great uncle, Major Engelbert Lutyens, also served in the regiment, which is noted on a plaque by the memorial. Engelbert was an orderly officer to Napoleon Bonaparte while the Lancashire Fusiliers guarded the latter during his exile in Saint Helena earlier in the 19th century. In light of his family connections with the regiment, Lutyens waived his fee for the memorial.

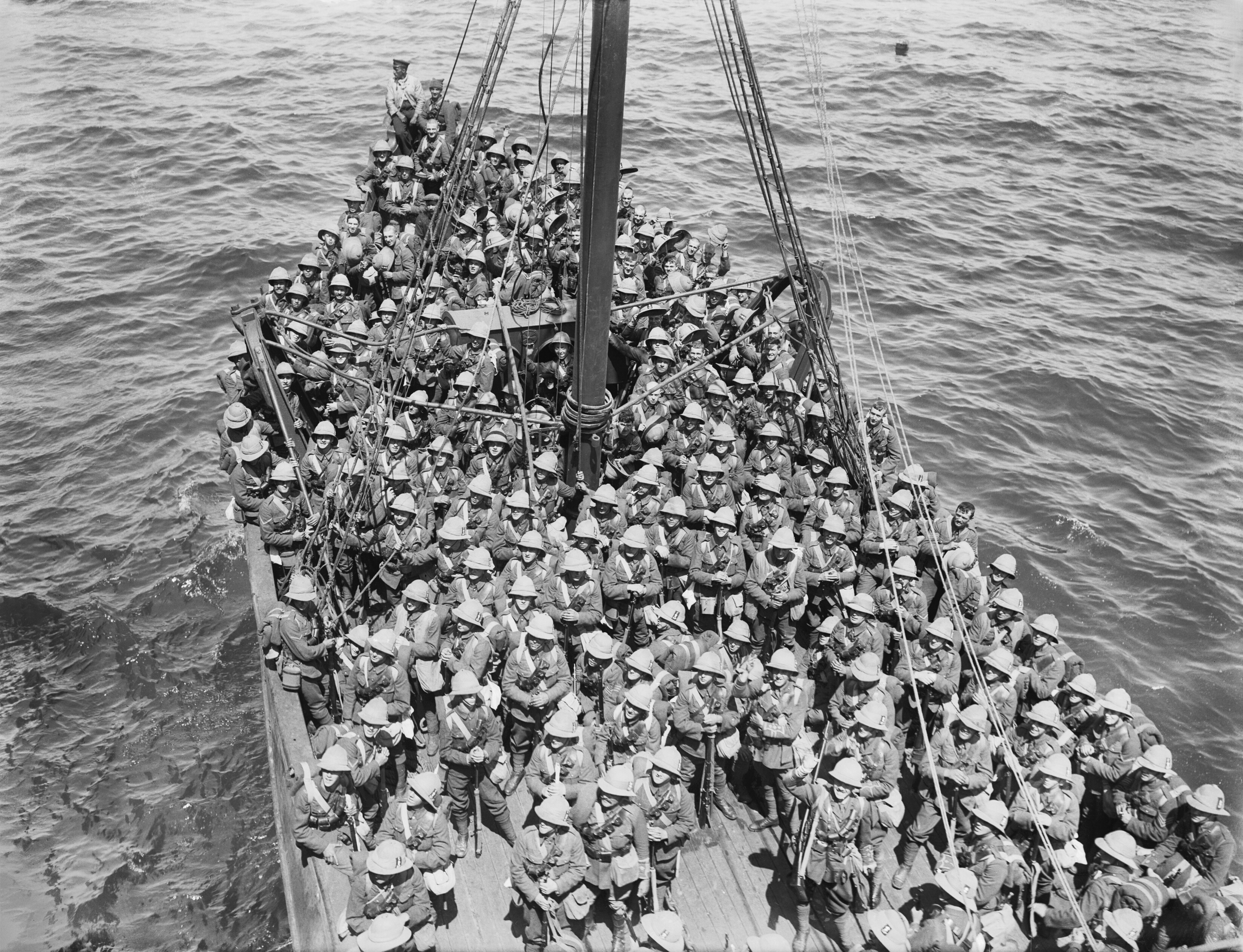
Lancashire Fusiliers en route to Gallipoli

The Lancashire Fusiliers (previously the 20th Regiment of Foot) was swollen by thousands of volunteers during the First World War, predominantly recruited from the towns to the north and west of Manchester (an area which was then in south-eastern Lancashire but became part of Greater Manchester in 1974). Many of the recruits signed up with neighbours, colleagues, social clubs, and other groups following the creation of the pals battalions. By the end of the war, it had grown to 30 battalions, including Territorial Force and New Army units. The 1st Battalion was stationed in Karachi at the outbreak of war in 1914 and was immediately shipped back to England and from there to the Mediterranean. It played a prominent role in the landing at Cape Helles (part of the Gallipoli Campaign, under the control of the 29th Division) on 25 April 1915, during which its members famously earned "six Victoria Crosses before breakfast". The Lancashire Fusiliers' beach was later named "Lancashire Landing". The 1st was transferred to France in March 1916. The 2nd Battalion was immediately posted to France and spent the remainder of its war on the Western Front, where it was involved in intense fighting. Its first engagement was the Battle of Le Cateau. The regular battalions were joined by multiple New Army battalions, some of which joined the fighting in France and Turkey, while others were held in reserve or posted to garrison ports around Britain. Both of the regular battalions and multiple territorial and New Army units participated in some of the largest battles of the war, including (among others) the Somme and Passchendaele (the Third Battle of Ypres).

== Commissioning ==
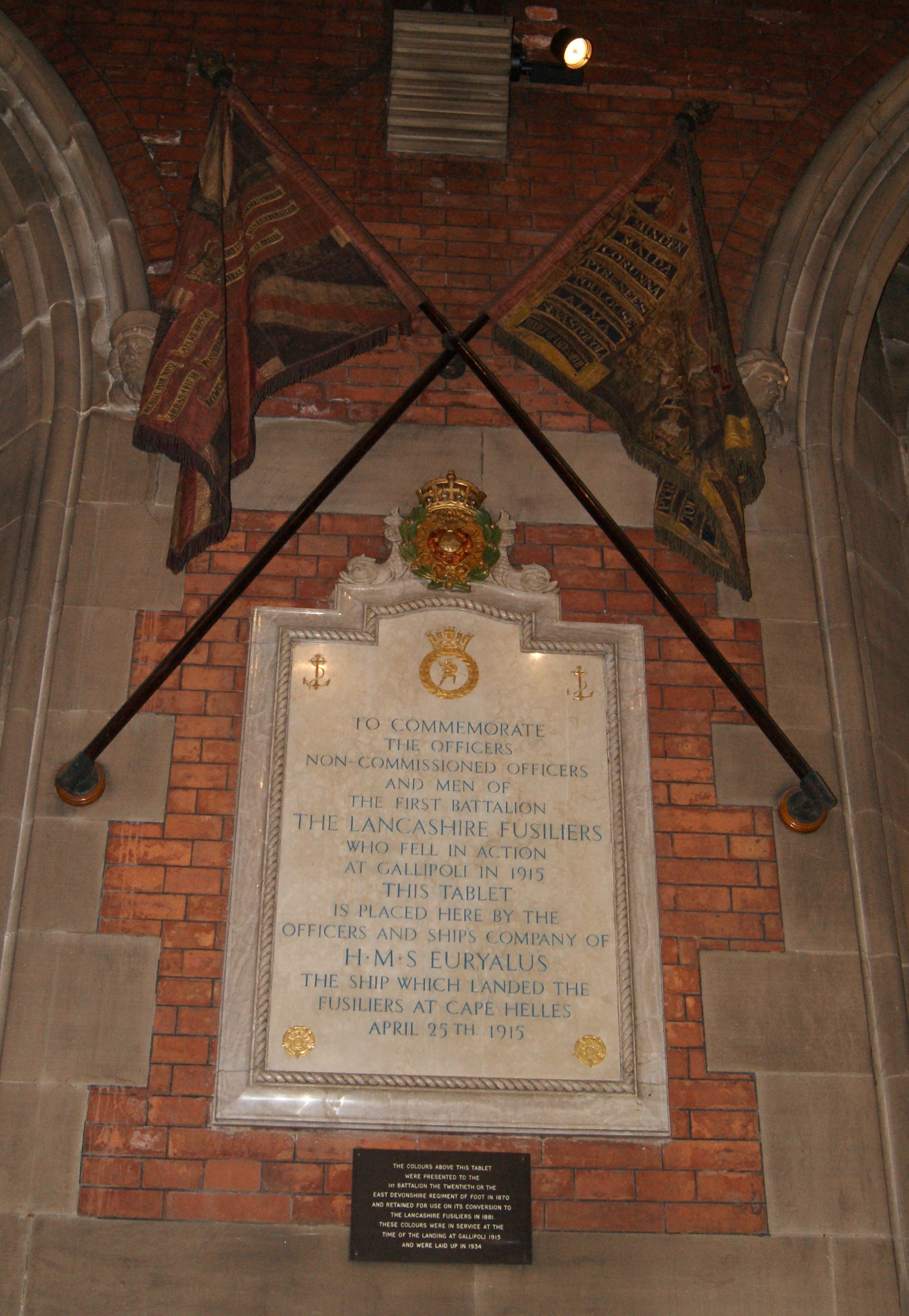
The memorial tablet placed by the crew of HMS Euryalus in St Mary's Church, Bury

By the end of the war, 13,642 Lancashire Fusiliers had been killed, including 600 at Cape Helles alone. The regiment earned 18 Victoria Crosses (including the "six before breakfast"), more than any other infantry regiment. The loss of so many men, and the losses at Gallipoli in particular, deeply affected the local community in Lancashire and especially Bury, where the regiment was headquartered. A ceremony to commemorate the Cape Helles landing has taken place every year since 1916 in the parish church, which contains a memorial to the Lancashire Fusiliers' efforts at Cape Helles, placed by the crew of HMS Euryalus (which carried the bulk of the 1st battalion to Gallipoli).

In light of the regiment's heavy losses, there was a strong feeling that their war efforts should be commemorated. This led Colonel George Wike to convene a meeting in Salford on 9 January 1919, where a committee was established with the mandate to raise £30,000 for a permanent memorial and a compassionate fund for soldiers and their families. Lutyens first travelled to Bury in September 1920 at the invitation of Colonel Wike. In a letter to his wife, Emily, he described the town as a "desolate spot". He was received by Wike and a group of other colonels, and dined with several of the regiment's officers. While touring potential locations for the memorial, he proposed a site outside the regimental headquarters in Wellington Barracks, to which the committee agreed.

== Design ==
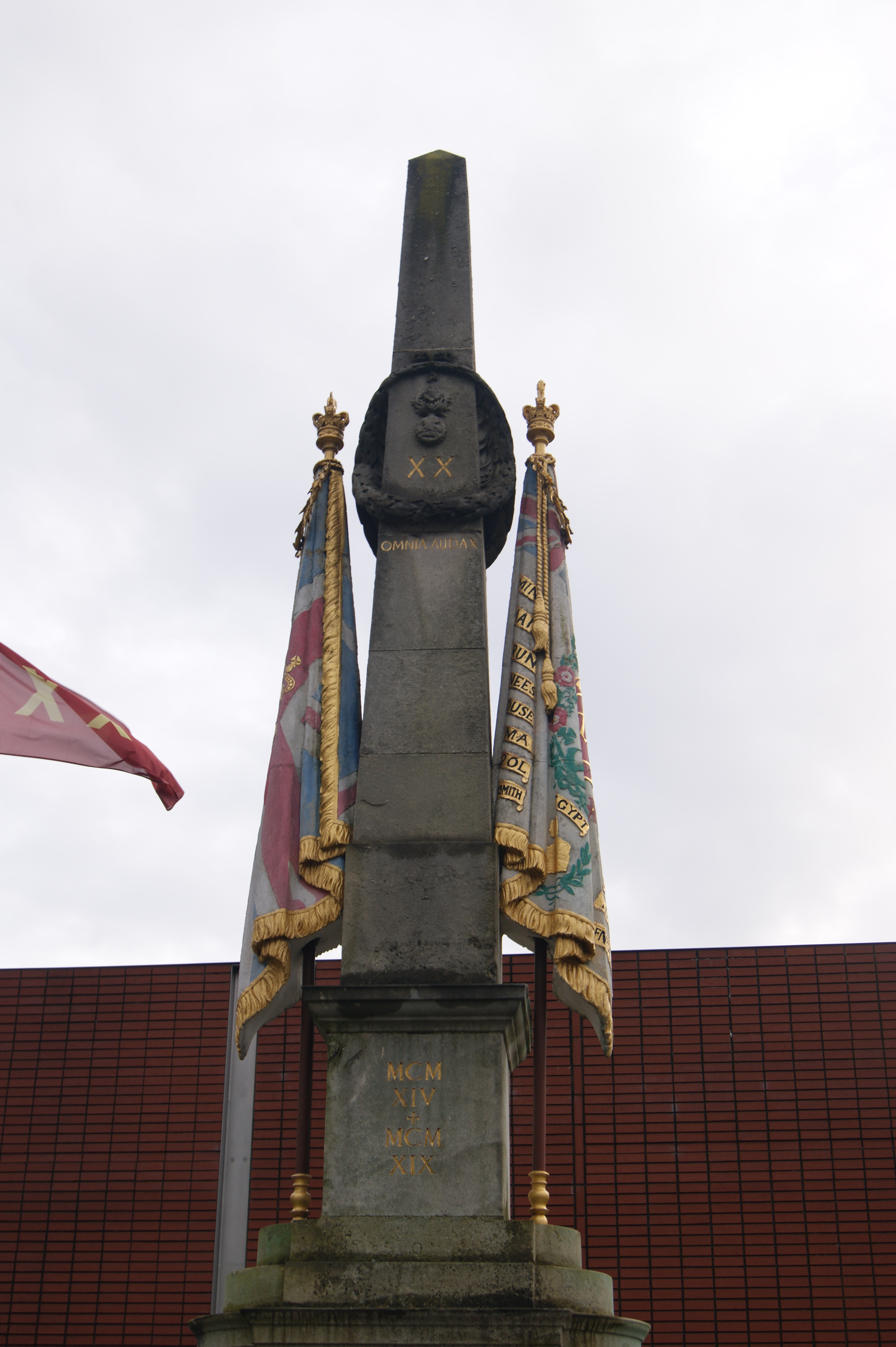
The top of the obelisk showing the painted flags and the sculpted cap badge inside a laurel wreath.

The memorial was built by John Tinline of Bury, a local stonemason. It consists of a single tall, tapering obelisk in Portland stone (similar to the pair on Lutyens' Northampton War Memorial) standing on a square base with a cornice where the two parts meet. Below the base is a carved frieze which sits on a pedestal of two rectangular blocks. The whole structure rests on a rectangular plinth and at the very bottom are two shallow circular steps. On the front and rear of the obelisk are carvings of the Lancashire Fusiliers' cap badge and the inscription "XX" (referring to the 20th Regiment of Foot, from which the Lancashire Fusiliers evolved) in gilded lettering, surrounded by a carved laurel wreath. On the front, below the wreath, the regiment's motto, OMNIA AUDAX ("daring in all things", awarded for the fusiliers' service in the Second Boer War), is inscribed. To either side are carved, painted flags: the King's Colour to the north (left when the memorial is viewed from the front) and the colour of 1st Battalion, the Lancashire Fusiliers to the south (right). The obelisk itself is 4 metres (13 ft) tall and the whole memorial is 6.9 metres (23 ft) tall.

The remaining inscriptions are all to the lower part of the structure. The dates of the First World War are carved just below the obelisk, and the dedication TO THE LANCASHIRE FUSILIERS THEIR DEEDS AND SACRIFICES FOR KING AND COUNTRY on the upper part of the pedestal. Below those, on the lower part of the pedestal and on the plinth, are later inscriptions: the dates of the Second World War and the further dedication AND ALL FUSILIERS WHO DIED IN SUBSEQUENT CAMPAIGNS (the latter added after the Lancashire Fusiliers' amalgamation in the 1960s). The architectural historian Nikolaus Pevsner opined that the memorial is one of the few beautiful public artefacts in an otherwise "drab" group of towns, and "more moving in its modesty" compared to some of Lutyens' grander designs for municipal war memorials.

== History ==
The memorial was unveiled by Lieutenant General Sir Henry de Beauvoir De Lisle—commander of the 29th Division, under which the 1st battalion was organised—on 25 April 1922, specifically chosen as the seventh anniversary of the Cape Helles landing. The general gave a speech in which he referenced the Gallipoli landings and the "six Victoria Crosses (VCs) before breakfast", after which he performed the unveiling by the then-novel method of an electric button. Lutyens was unable to attend the ceremony but sent a cable. Other dignitaries included several local mayors, Captain Richard Willis (recipient of one of the six VCs), three generals, and the Rector of Bury who led prayers. In addition to the memorial itself, spare funds were spent on drums and bugles for the regiment and donated to the fusiliers' compassionate fund out of a desire that the living benefit from the funds. The drums and bugles were formally presented to the regiment at the unveiling ceremony, at the conclusion of which the bugles were used to sound the Last Post. They are now on display in the Fusilier Museum, adjacent to the memorial's site in Bury. Lutyens designed one other obelisk as a regimental memorial, the Oxfordshire and Buckinghamshire Light Infantry War Memorial in Cowley, Oxford, which was unveiled the year after the Lancashire Fusiliers' memorial. The two memorials are similar, though the OBLI's is more modestly decorated.

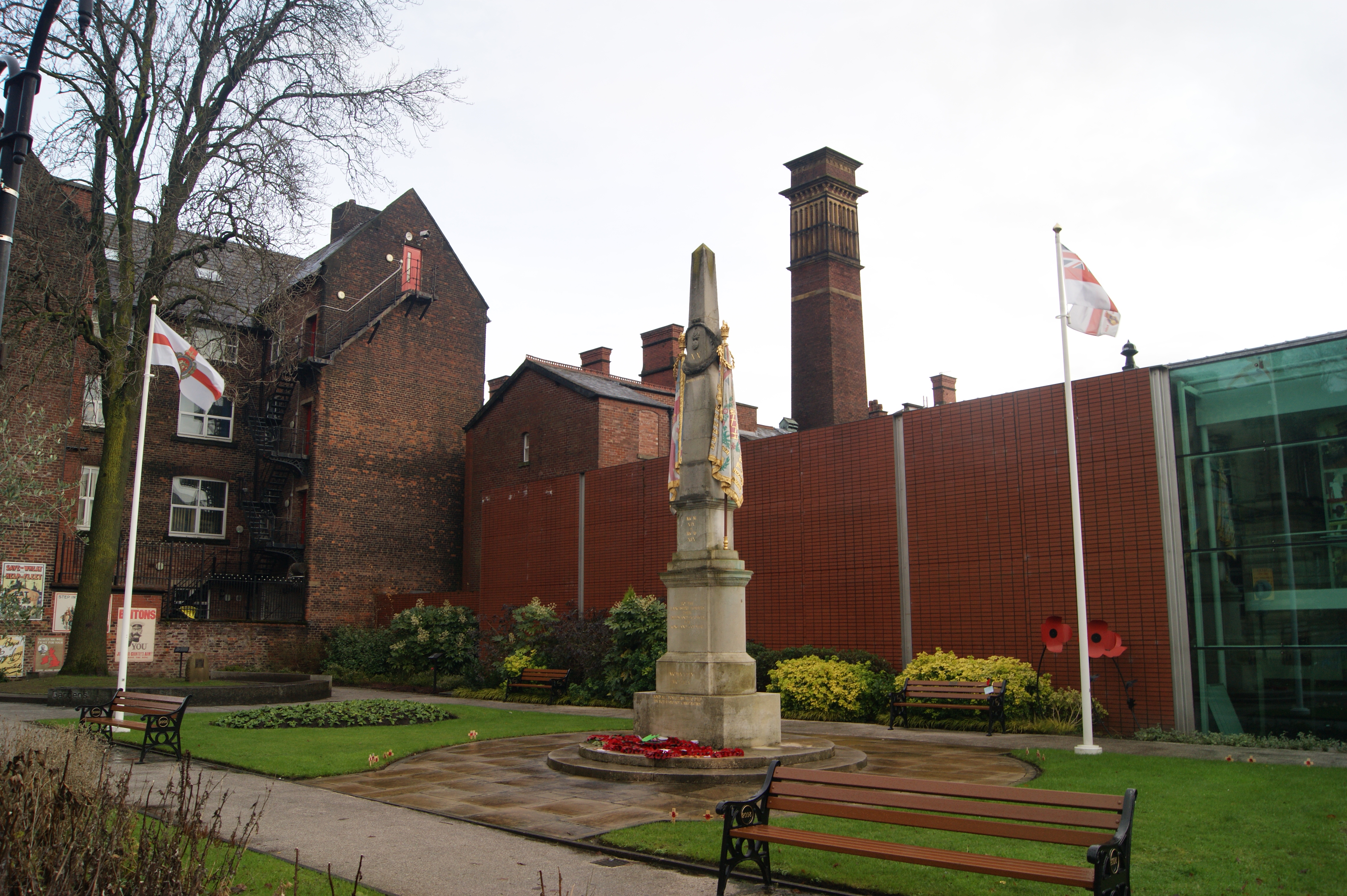
The memorial in its modern setting in Gallipoli Gardens, outside the Fusilier Museum, in Bury town centre

When the Lancashire Fusiliers were amalgamated with other fusilier regiments into the Royal Regiment of Fusiliers in 1968, the new regiment adopted the memorial and rededicated it to commemorate all fusiliers killed in the line of duty. It stood in its original location outside the regimental headquarters at Wellington Barracks for over 40 years, but the barracks closed with the amalgamation and were mostly demolished in the 1970s. As a result, the memorial was moved to the side of Bolton Road, outside the front gate of the former barracks. In 2009, Sparrow Park was redeveloped as Gallipoli Gardens and the Fusilier Museum moved there from the former regimental headquarters. The war memorial was dismantled and repaired before being re-installed next to the museum. Lutyens' grandson, Lord Ridley, unveiled the memorial in its new location on 27 September (the day before the official reopening of the museum), after which the Rector of Bury, the Reverend John Findon, led a dedicatory service.

The Lancashire Fusiliers memorial was designated a Grade II listed building on 2 September 1992. It was upgraded to Grade II* in April 2015, along with Deal War Memorial in Kent and the memorial to the 29th Division (under which the 1st Battalion Lancashire Fusiliers was organised) at Stretton-on-Dunsmore in Warwickshire, to mark the centenary of the Gallipoli landings. Historic England further recognised the Lancashire Fusiliers memorial as part of a "national collection" of Lutyens' war memorials in November 2015. Listed building status offers legal protection from demolition or modification; Grade II* is reserved for "particularly important buildings of more than special interest" and applied to about 5.5% of listings.

== See also ==
- Grade II* listed buildings in Greater Manchester
- Grade II* listed war memorials in England
- Listed buildings in Bury
