= Old City Hall Cenotaph, Toronto =

Canadian war memorial

Toronto Cenotaph
- (Old City Hall Cenotaph)
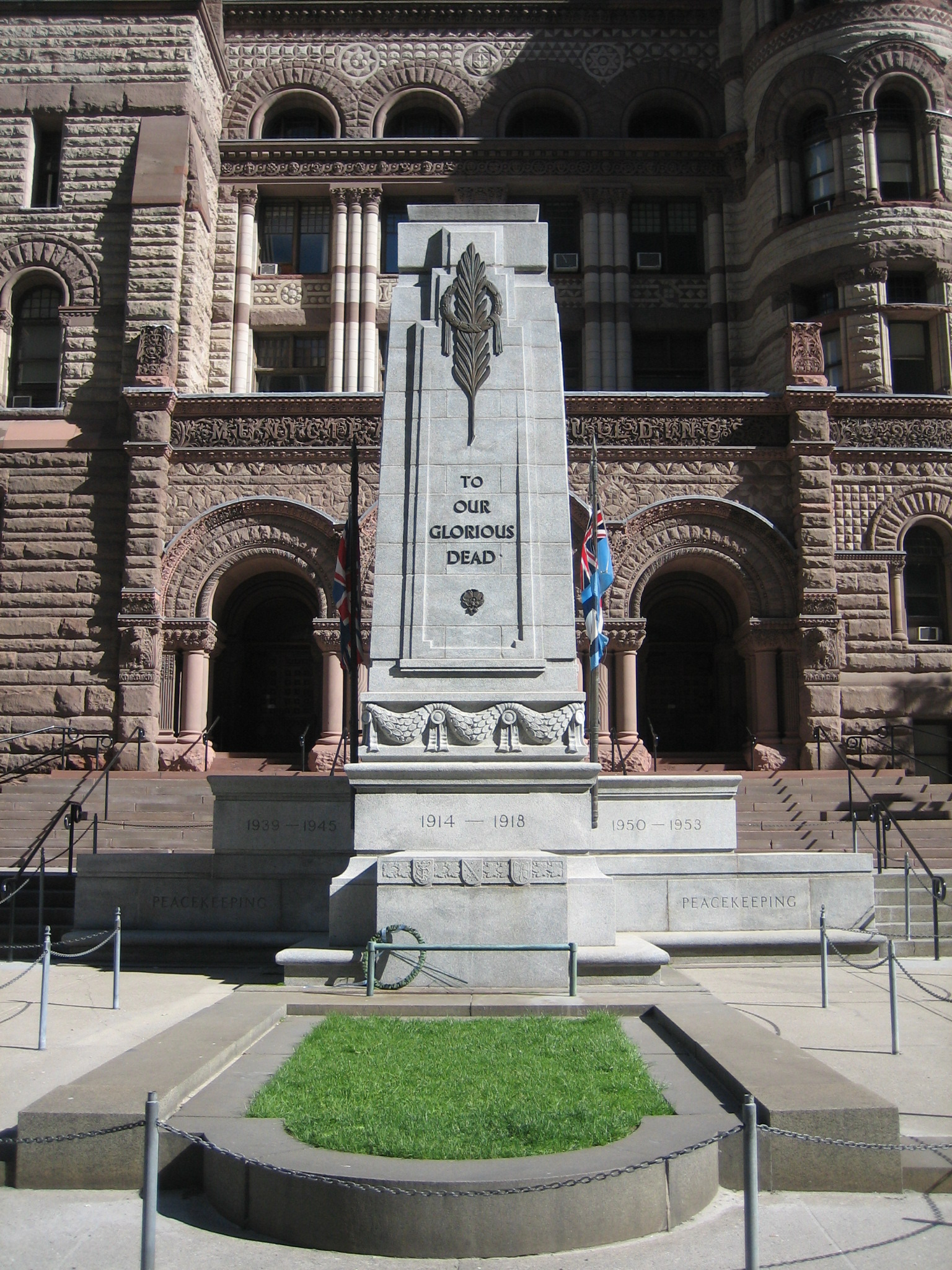
- The cenotaph outside of Old City Hall
- Interactive map of Toronto Cenotaph
- Location: Toronto, Ontario
- Coordinates: 43°39′07.70″N 079°22′54.21″W
- Designer: W.M. Ferguson and T.C. Pomphrey
- Type: War memorial
- Material: Granite
- Beginning date: 1924
- Completion date: 1925
- Opening date: November 11, 1925
- Dedicated to: Those who served in World War I, World War II and the Korean War

The Old City Hall Cenotaph is a cenotaph located at the front steps of Old City Hall in Toronto, Ontario, Canada.

Originally built after World War I to commemorate Torontonians who lost their lives in services for Canada, the memorial also commemorates those who died in World War II and the Korean War. It was modelled on The Cenotaph at Whitehall in London, England, constructed using granite cut from the Canadian Shield, and unveiled on November 11, 1925. The City of Toronto lists the artists as "Ferguson/Pomphrey", which were an architectural firm located at 282 St. Clements Ave. in north Toronto. Their design was selected from among 50 designed submitted after City Council's request to replace a temporary wooden structure that had been used each Remembrance Day since 1919. The two Toronto architects received a fee of $2,500 for the work; this was 10% of the cost of the $25,000 project. The work was completed within budget and on time. There was some controversy before the monument was unveiled; "the only wording on the Cenotaph would be a simple four word statement “TO ALL WHO SERVED.” Then someone realized that this monument was in fact a cenotaph, a structure that by the very definition of that word (from the Greek kenotaphion – kenos, empty + taphos, tomb) signified an “empty tomb.” " As a memorial to those who had died and are buried elsewhere, it was felt that TO ALL WHO SERVED was inappropriate in such a case. After much discussion, the original inscription was removed and replaced with the current TO OUR GLORIOUS DEAD.

The memorial features a stone laid by Field Marshal Haig on July 24, 1925.

The site is one of several locations used for Remembrance Day commemorations in Toronto.

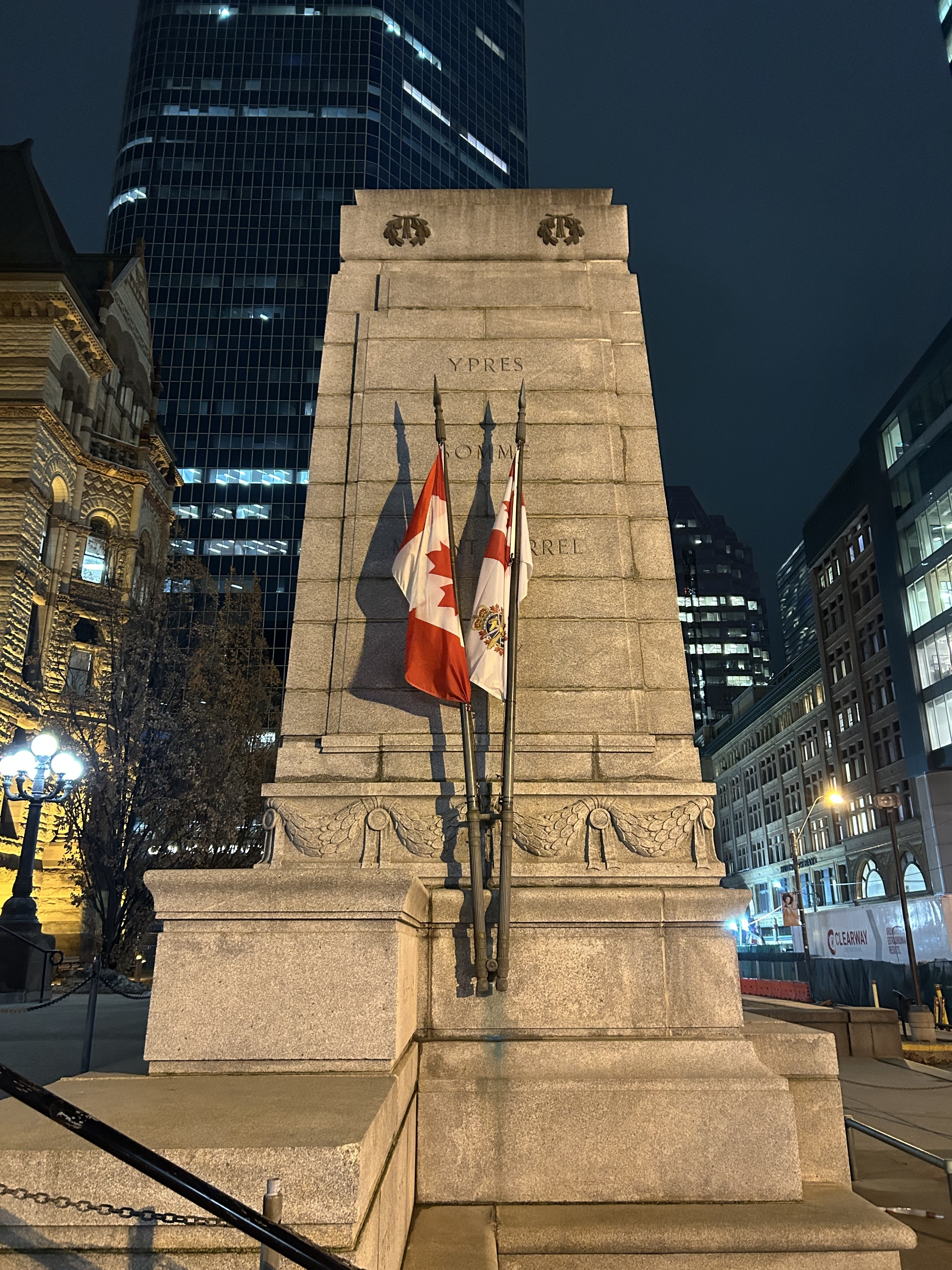

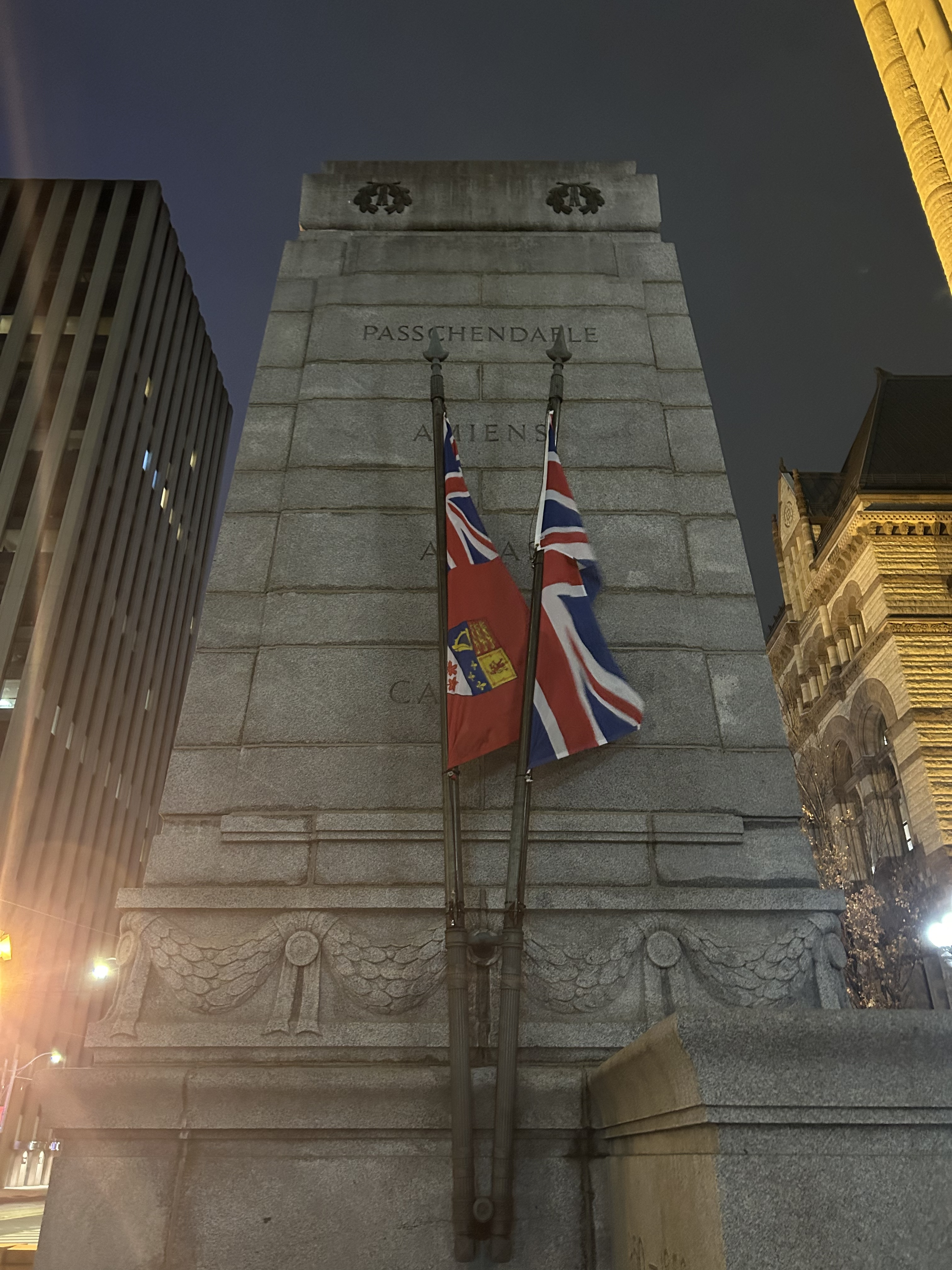

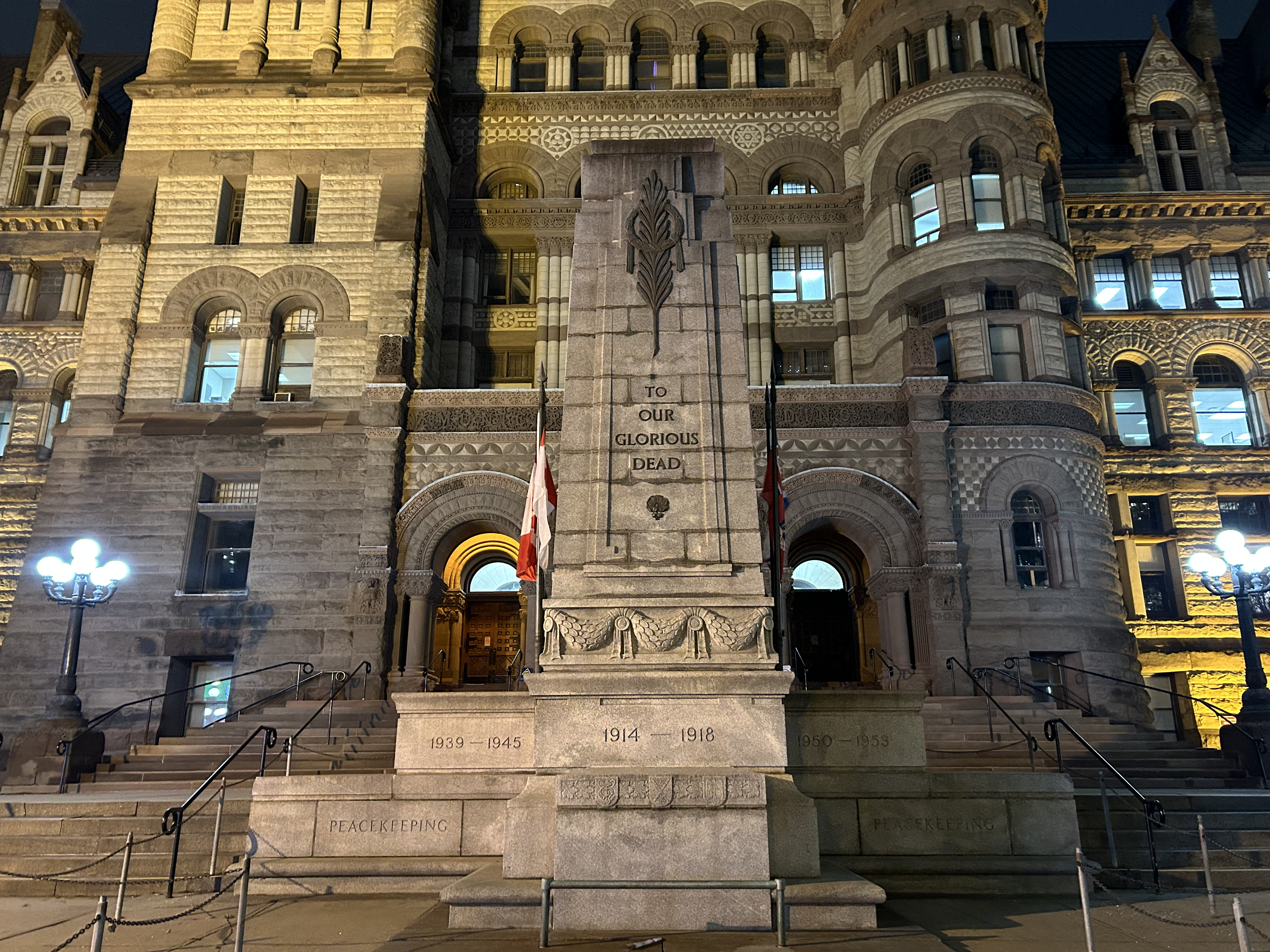

== See also ==
- Canadian war memorials
