= Old City Hall (Toronto) =

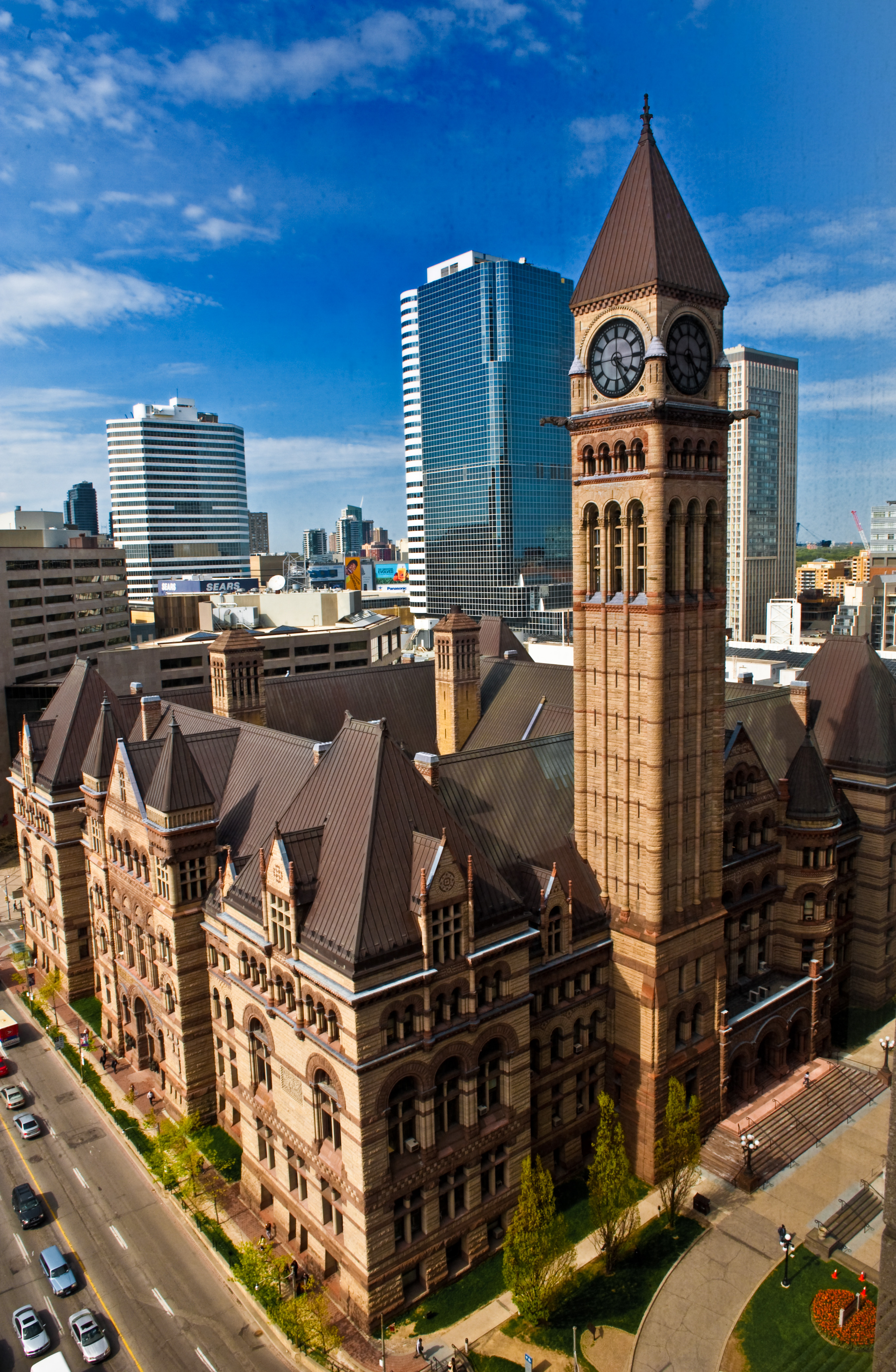
- Toronto's Old City Hall
- Former names: Toronto City Hall and York County Court House

Record height
- Tallest in Canada from 1899 to 1928^{[I]}
- Preceded by: Cathedral Church of St. James (Toronto)
- Surpassed by: Tour de la Banque Royale

General information
- Type: Civic building, court house
- Architectural style: Richardsonian Romanesque
- Location: Toronto, Ontario, Canada, 60 Queen Street West
- Coordinates: 43°39′9″N 79°22′54″W
- Current tenants: vacant
- Construction started: 1889
- Completed: 1899
- Inaugurated: September 18, 1899
- Renovated: 1980s, 2002
- Owner: City of Toronto

Height
- Height: 103.64 m (340.0 ft) (tower)

Technical details
- Floor count: 7

Design and construction
- Architect: Edward James Lennox

National Historic Site of Canada
- Designated: 1984

The Old City Hall is a Romanesque-style civic building and former court house in Toronto, Ontario, Canada. It was the home of the Toronto City Council from 1899 to 1966 and a provincial court house until 2023, and remains one of the city's most prominent structures.

The building is located at the corner of Queen and Bay streets, across Bay Street from Nathan Phillips Square and the present City Hall in Downtown Toronto. The heritage landmark has a distinctive clock tower which heads the length of Bay Street from Front Street to Queen Street as a terminating vista. Old City Hall was designated a National Historic Site in 1984.

== History ==
Toronto's Old City Hall was one of the largest buildings in Toronto and the largest civic building in North America upon completion in 1899. It was the burgeoning city's third city hall. It housed Toronto's municipal government and courts for York County and Toronto, taking over from the Adelaide Street Court House. York County offices were also located in Old City Hall from 1900 to 1953. With the establishment of Metropolitan Toronto, the county seat and court moved to Newmarket, Ontario (and to the Old Newmarket Town Hall and Courthouse).

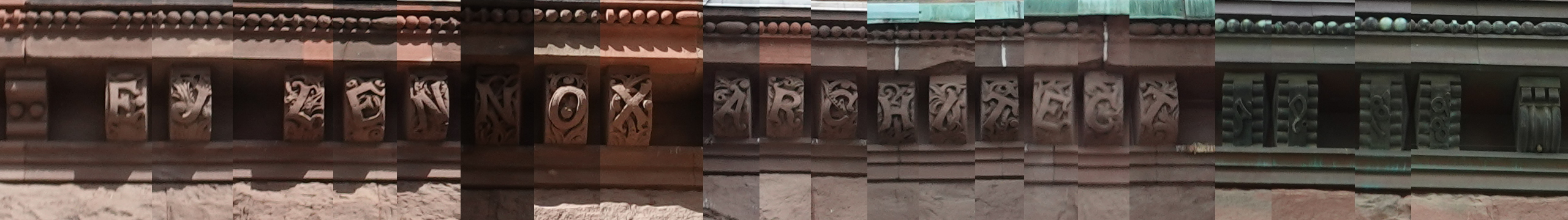
Corbels beneath the upper floor eaves around the entire building spelling "EJ LENNOX ARCHITECT AD 1898".

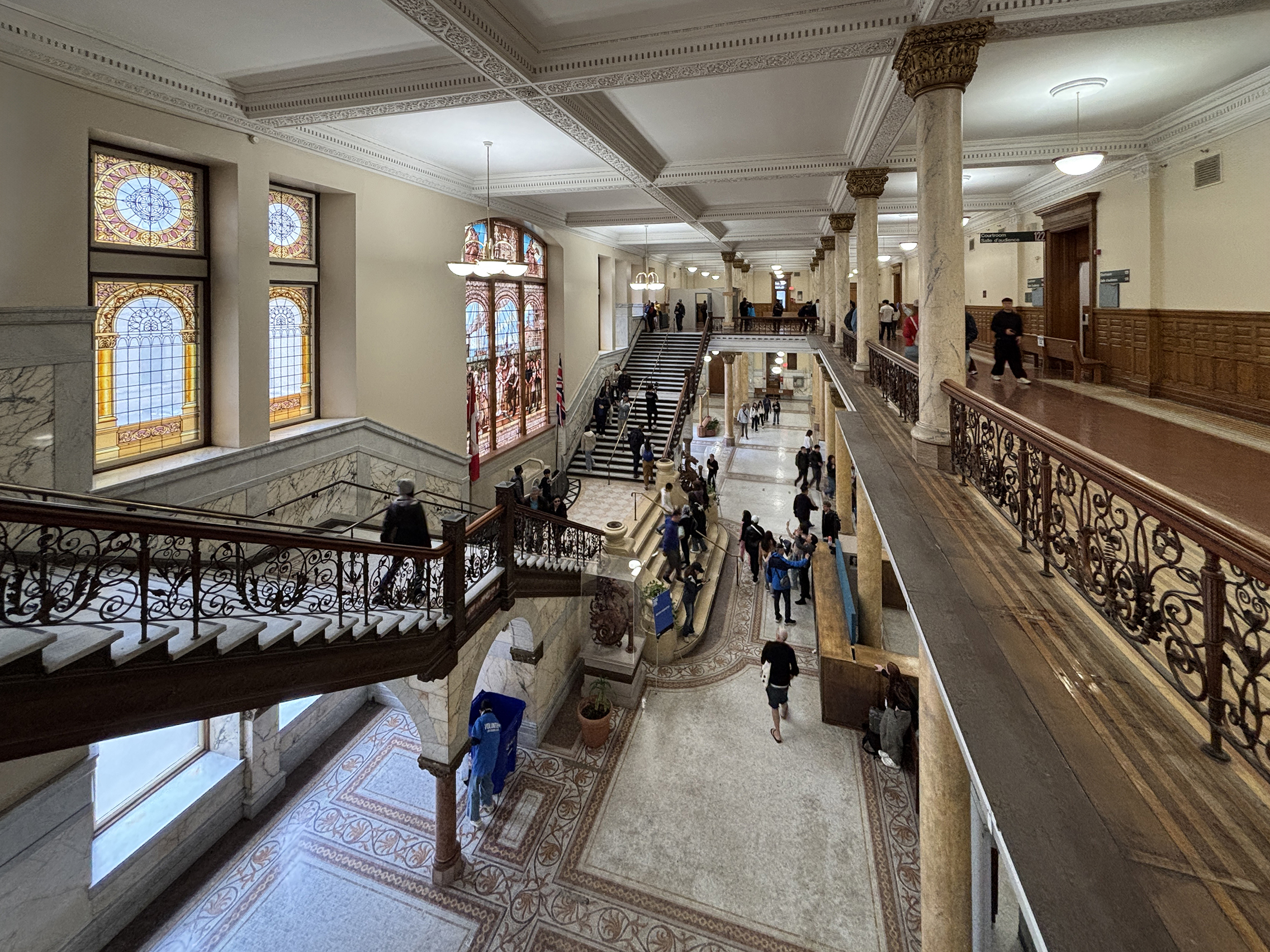
Lobby in Level 2

Designed by prominent Toronto architect Edward James Lennox, the building took more than a decade to build and cost more than $2.5 million (equals close to 53 million today). Construction began in 1889 on the site of old York buildings, including the Lennox hotel. It was constructed of sandstone from the Credit River valley, grey stone from the Orangeville, Ontario, area, and brown stone from New Brunswick. Angry councillors, due to cost overruns and construction delays, refused E. J. Lennox a plaque proclaiming him as architect for the completed building in 1899. Not to be denied, Lennox had stonemasons "sign" his name in corbels beneath the upper floor eaves around the entire building: "EJ LENNOX ARCHITECT AD 1898".

Lennox designed an annex, called Manning Chambers after former mayor Alexander Manning, at the northwest corner of Bay and Queen Street. Completed in 1900, the five-storey building was later demolished to make way for the current Toronto City Hall.

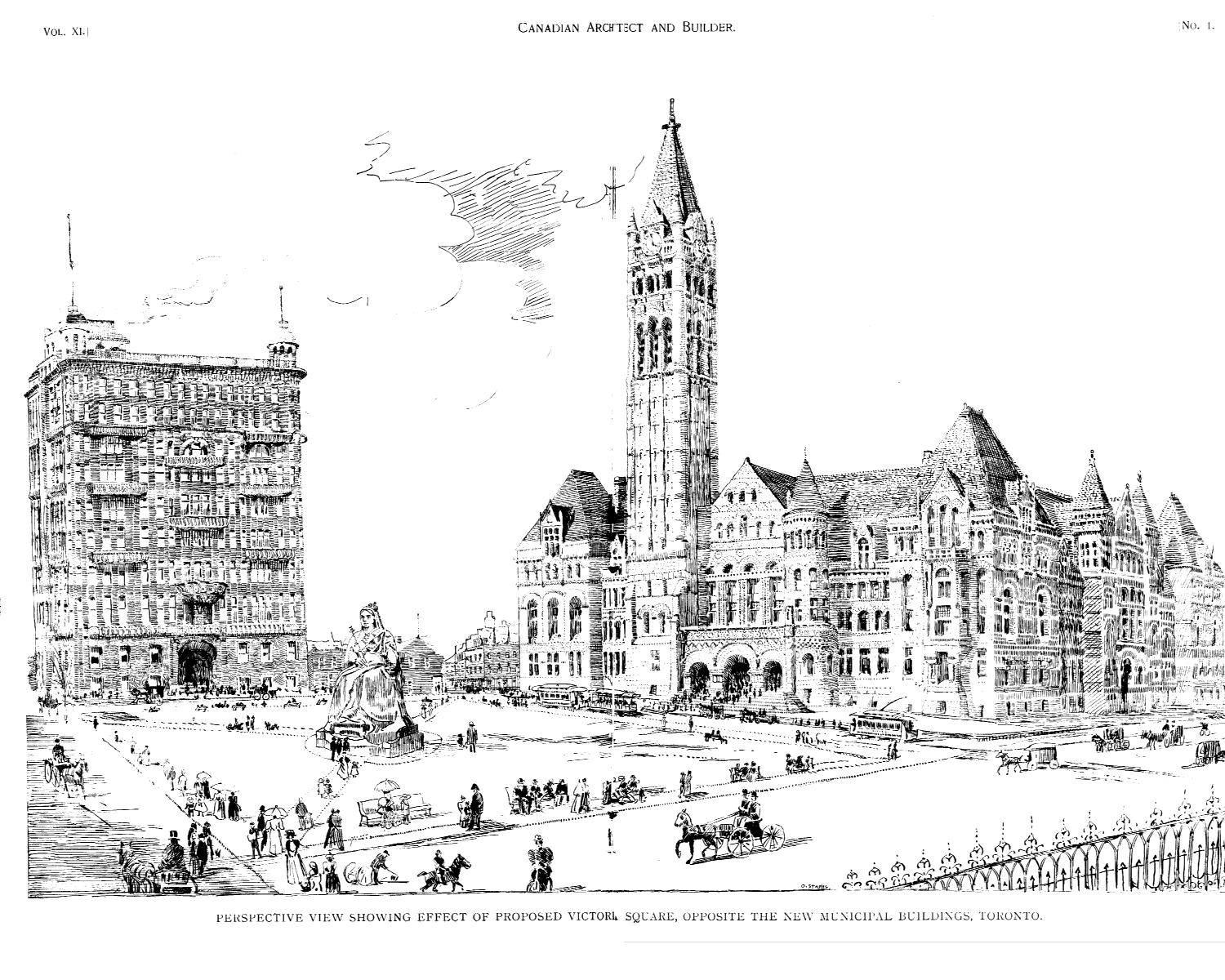
An 1898 drawing of a proposed square in front of Old City Hall. The planners of Old City Hall planned for a public plaza at the south entrance of city hall known as Victoria Square.

Planners proposed a public plaza at the south entrance of the city hall called Victoria Square. The space was to be an urban square with diagonal walkways meeting at a central statue of Queen Victoria, its proposed namesake. The plan was never executed and a smaller space was allocated in front of the building by Queen Street. The City Beautiful movement influenced Toronto planning as well in the early 20th century, and a plan was formulated for a grand thoroughfare from Queen Street at City Hall to Front Street that would have been called Federal Avenue. It, too, was never built, though the City Beautiful movement did influence the urban design principles of nearby University Avenue.

At the foot of the steps on Queen Street is the Cenotaph, erected in 1925 to honour Torontonians who died in World War I fighting for Canada, and later also in honour of Torontonians who died in the Second World War, the Korean War, and Canadian peacekeeping operations during Remembrance Day ceremonies every November 11.

Four gargoyles were part of the Clock Tower during the 1899 construction, but were removed due to the effects of the weather on the sandstone carvings in 1938. In 2002, bronze casts of the gargoyles were reinstalled. The replicas are not duplicates as the original designs were lost. The gargoyles are similar to those on the Peace Tower in Ottawa. Two grotesques and antique lampposts at the base of the grand staircase inside were removed in 1947 and sold. They were reclaimed by the City and reinstalled in the 1980s.

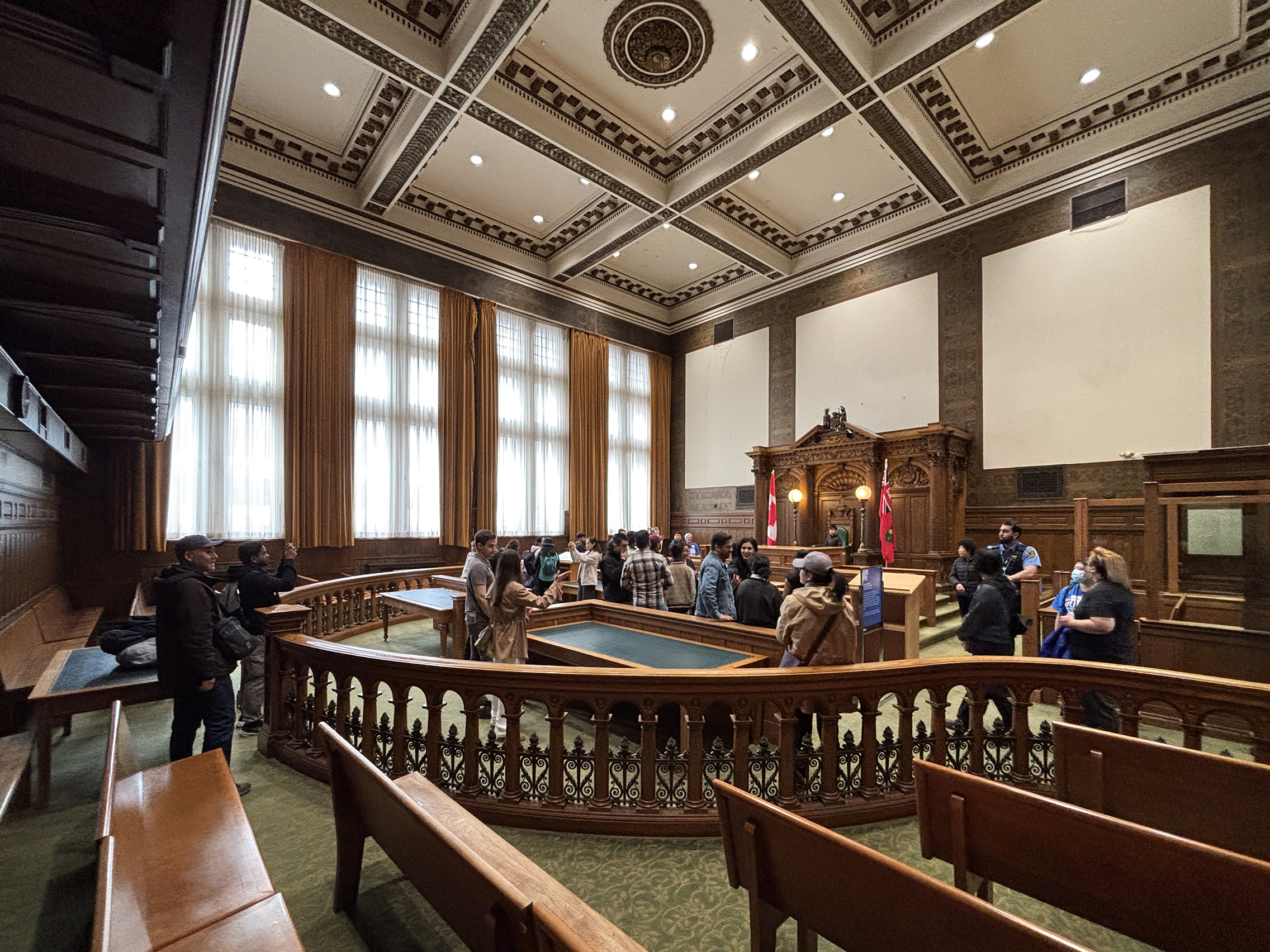
Council Chambers of Old City Hall. The chambers have been used as a courtroom since the building became a dedicated courthouse.

Despite its size, Old City Hall proved inadequate for Toronto's growing municipal government within a couple of decades of completion. Under Mayor Nathan Phillips, Toronto City Council launched an international design competition for a new city hall and public square across Bay Street and completed a striking Modernist city hall and public square in 1965. Soon after in the 1960s, plans were made to start construction of the Toronto Eaton Centre. The original plans called for Old City Hall to be demolished and replaced by a retail complex, and a number of skyscrapers around a large plaza, leaving only the cenotaph (or in one plan, the clock tower) in the front. Public outcry forced authorities to abandon these plans, and the Eaton Centre was constructed around the landmark civic building and the Church of the Holy Trinity (which was also slated for demolition). Old City Hall then became a dedicated courthouse.

=== Courthouse ===
The building was leased for several decades by the provincial government and used as a court house for the Ontario Court of Justice. The City of Toronto served a notice on the province that its lease at Old City Hall would not be renewed past December 31, 2016. The city spent $77 million on renovations completed in 2005 to restore the exterior and the 103.6-metre-high clock tower. Over the next two years, the city spent an additional $7.2-million on interior repairs completed in 2012. There was speculation that the building would house a museum for the city of Toronto.

On September 21, 2015, the City of Toronto released an internal study that recommended leasing parts of the Old City Hall to retail tenants. However, in early October, the city said it would allow courts to remain until December 31, 2021, while the new 10 Armoury Street courthouse was constructed. This was extended until 2023 due to construction delays.

In 2023, most court rooms and services moved to a new purpose-built courthouse at 10 Armoury Street, leaving eight municipally-run provincial offence courts which relocated from Old City Hall to St. Lawrence Market North in March 2025.

=== Future ===
In lieu of converting the structure into retail space, the Government Management Committee voted in 2015 to study housing a city museum in the historic structure.

Toronto City Council voted in 2018 to advance plans for a city museum at the site but little progress has been made as of 2024 and staff estimate $190 million of work will be required before a new occupant can move into the building.

The provincial government is reportedly considering using the building as a temporary home for the Ontario Legislative Assembly once Queen's Park closes in 2026 for extensive renovations.

== Architecture ==
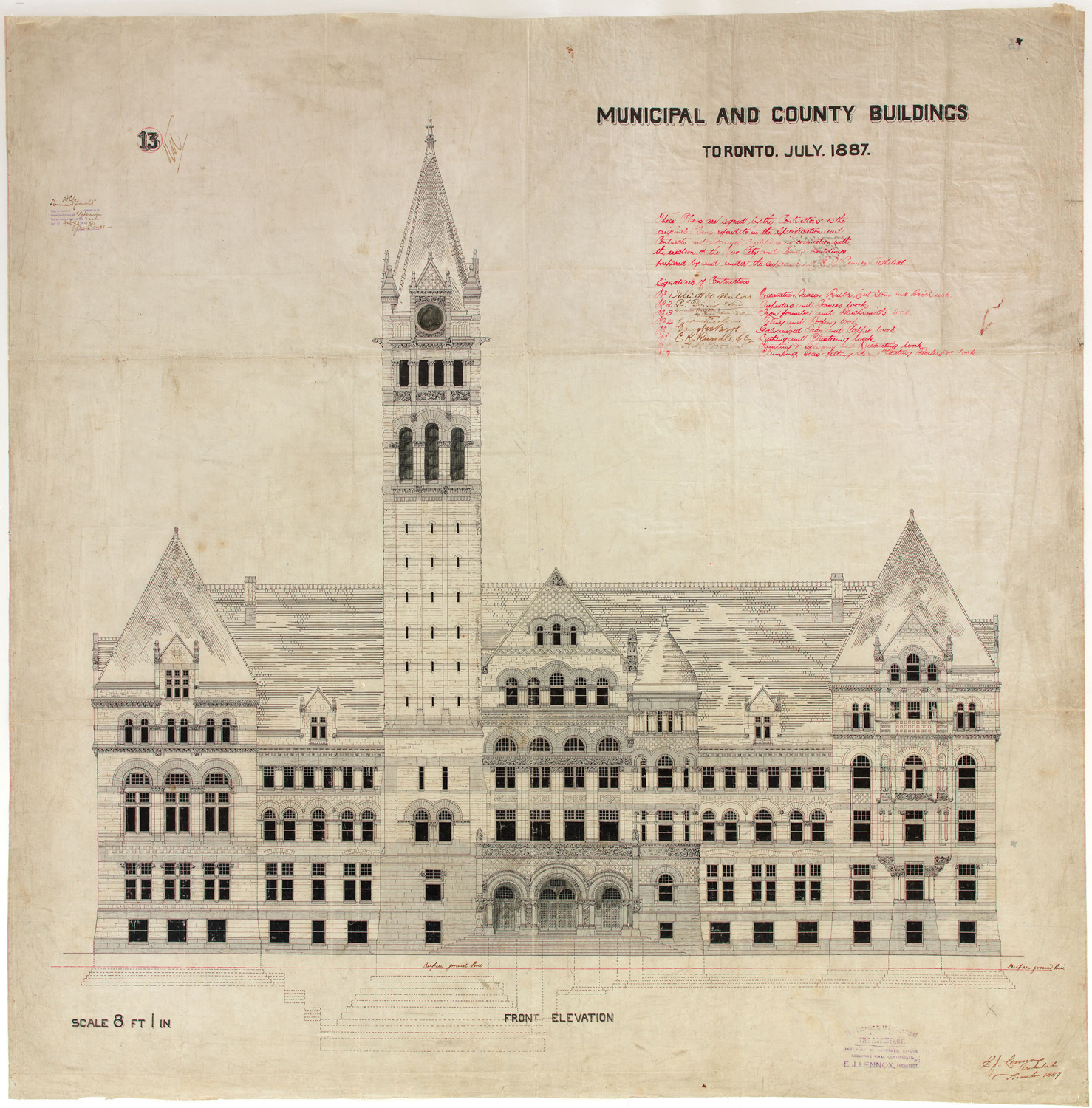
Architectural drawings of Old City Hall from Queen Street West from 1887

Old City Hall can be described as an enormous square quad with a courtyard in the middle. Situated at the front elevation, its clock tower was placed off centre to provide a terminating vista for Bay Street. In spite of this seeming asymmetry, the balance of the design is still existent throughout. Ultimately, even though the clock tower was off centre, balance was achieved through the repetition of the subtle details of measure and pattern. For example, to the right side of the main entrance a narrow circular tower rises 21.4 meters from grade. It is cut precisely in half by the roof line; it extends above the roof line by 10.7 meters and is also 10.7 meters from the roof line to the base of the main tower. Further on, the east and west pavilions, although quite different in their designs, are very similar in shape. The double-storied oriel of the east tower is exaggerated to counter the weight of the double tower of the west pavilion. The subtle balance is able to stand out at the main entrance of the building and prevent it from being overshadowed by the clock tower. The exterior rock-face wall was built in a series of courses, in variable sizes separated by carved bands. Grouped columns are repeatedly used to accent the windows.

=== Romanesque Revival style ===
Old City Hall was designed by architect E. J. Lennox in a variation of Romanesque Revival architecture known as Richardsonian Romanesque. Developed by Henry Hobson Richardson, this variation highlights bulk and massiveness as well as different sculptural features. The Romanesque style originated in Europe during the 11th and 12th centuries and had characteristics such as square towers, asymmetrical massing, stone carvings, round arches, and heavy stonework. During the mid-1800s, this style was revitalized in Western architecture. H. H. Richardson contributed dormers, circular towers with conical roofs, and the use of different-coloured stone for the revival style that bears his name. Carvings of humans and animals were also part of the Richardsonian Romanesque style. Lennox was interested in and was influenced by Richardson's work and travelled to the United States while he was planning his design for Toronto's third city hall in the late 19th century.

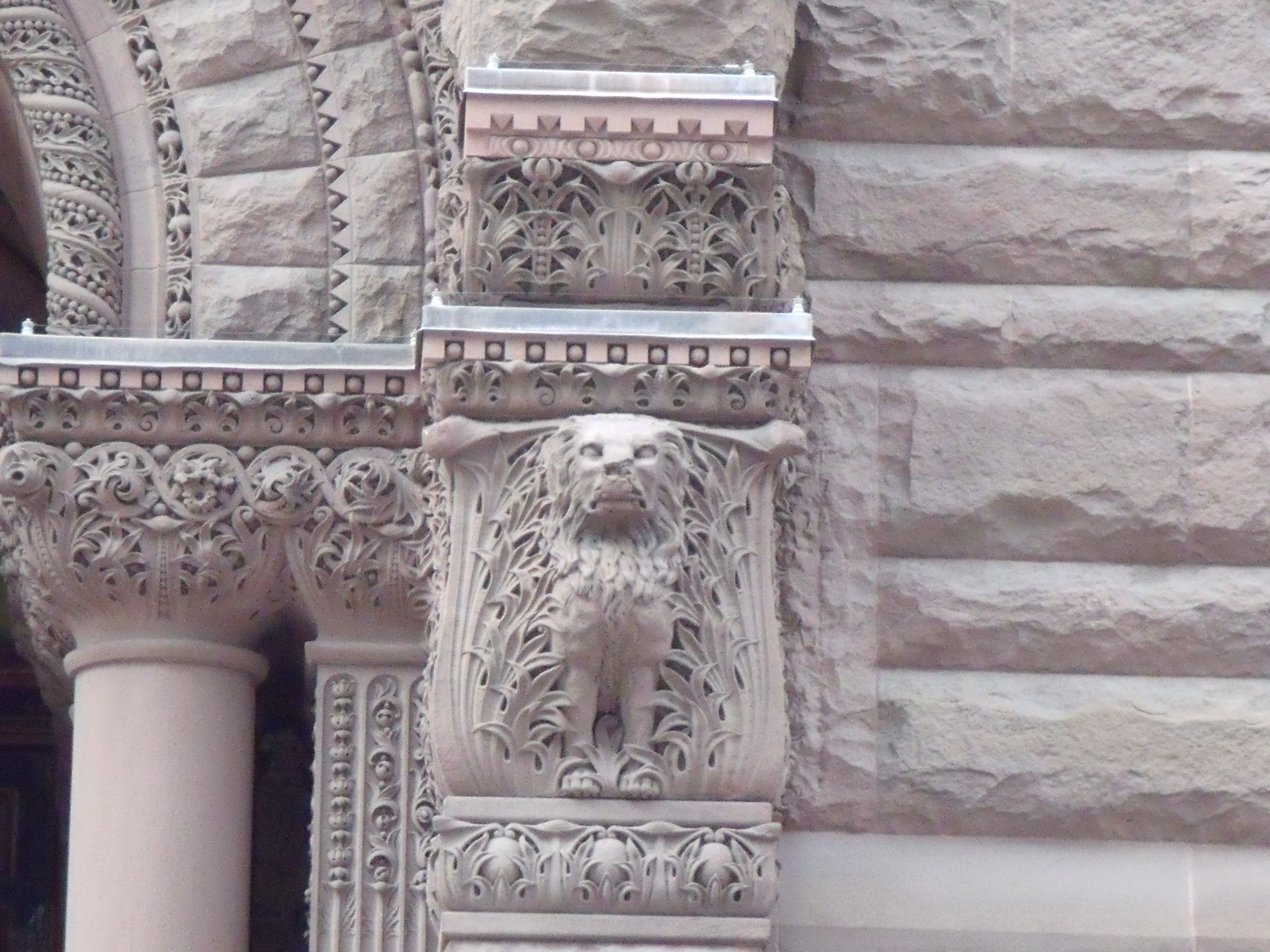
Carvings of animals and humans may be found throughout the exterior of the building.

These influences can be seen at Old City Hall with many of its many arches and towers. Also, the use of different-coloured stone contributes towards the Romanesque style of design. The exterior and interiors of Old City Hall are crafted with great detail. On the clock tower, four stone gargoyles were placed near the top of the tower. Near the building's entrance, there are several grotesque faces carved in stone. Lennox included his own likeness next to the other carved faces which, tradition has it, represent city councillors. Lennox's own face is identified as one of the caricatures by his handlebar moustache.

The entire building has ornamentation derived from ancient Roman art. There are structural decorations used by the different colours of stone. The stone carvers did not complete work until a year after opening day, as there were many decorative pieces. The stonework on the entrance was restored in 1999.

Made primarily of sandstone, Old City Hall features a two-tone façade. One tone is made of light brown-grey sandstone from the former Beaumont Quarries (now known as Dorchester Sandstone Quarries located in Westmorland County, New Brunswick). This tone is accented with darker reddish-brown sandstone known as Sackville Sandstone (also located in the Westmorland County of New Brunswick). The transportation of the stone employed the use of over 1,360 rail-car loads, equivalent to a nine-mile-long (14.5 km) train, to bring the material to the site. In addition to the stone, 8,354 barrels of cement were used to hold everything together.

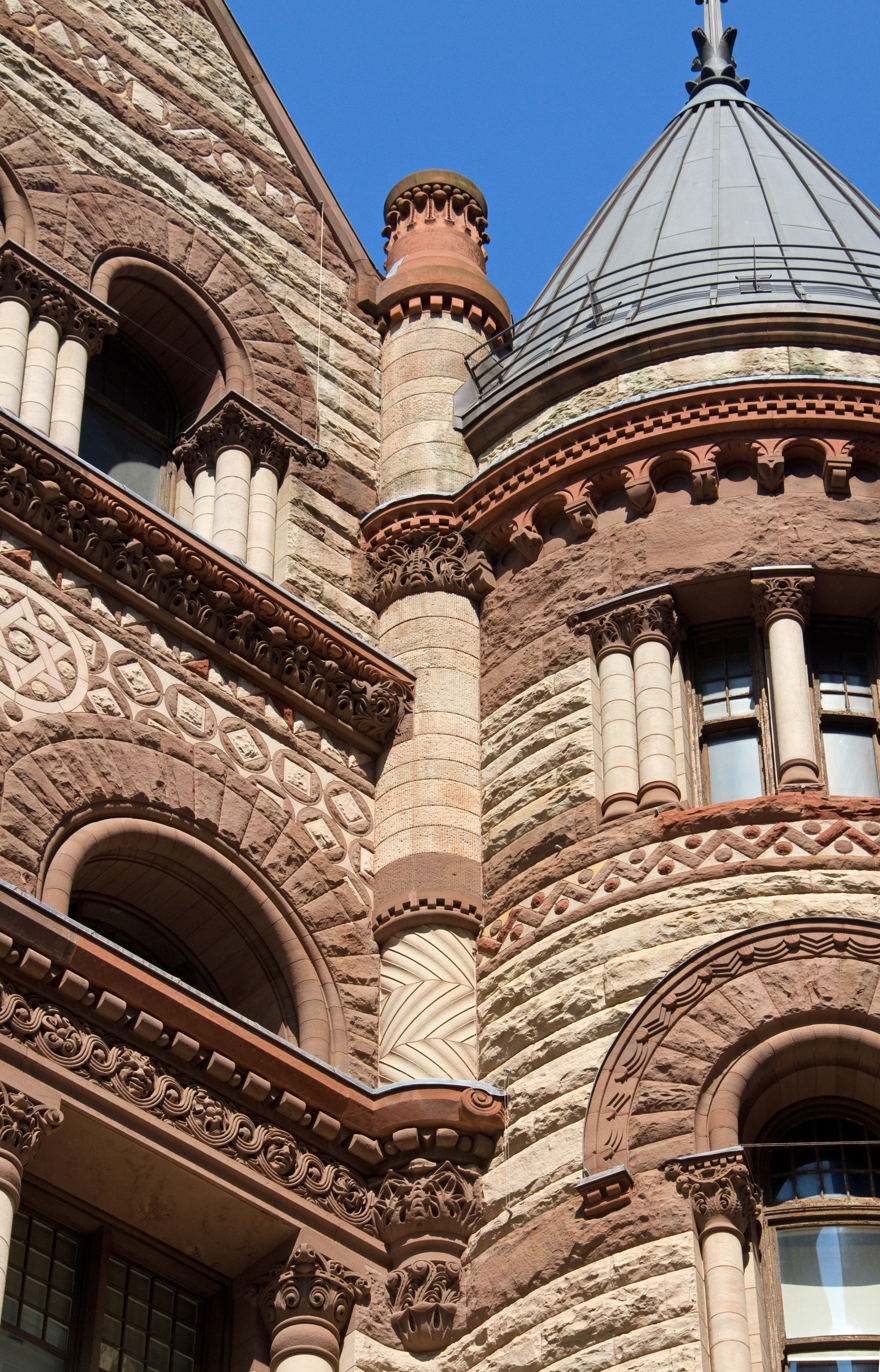
Made primarily of sandstone, Old City Hall features a two-tone façade.

What is interesting about the sandstone is not just the variations in colour, but also the textural characteristics of the stone. Observation of the building's profile shows it is cut stone with a rock-faced texture application. Despite the roughness of the sandstone, it is not perceived to be jagged, but rather heavily weathered. The raw state of the sandstone reinforces the natural state of the material and greatly heightens the overall sense of mass that the building exhibits. The scale of the stone pieces greatly contributes to the sense of mass as well, conveying the sense that the building was literally carved from the rock and placed where it currently resides.

The building bears a resemblance to the city hall buildings in Cincinnati and Minneapolis.

=== Interior ===
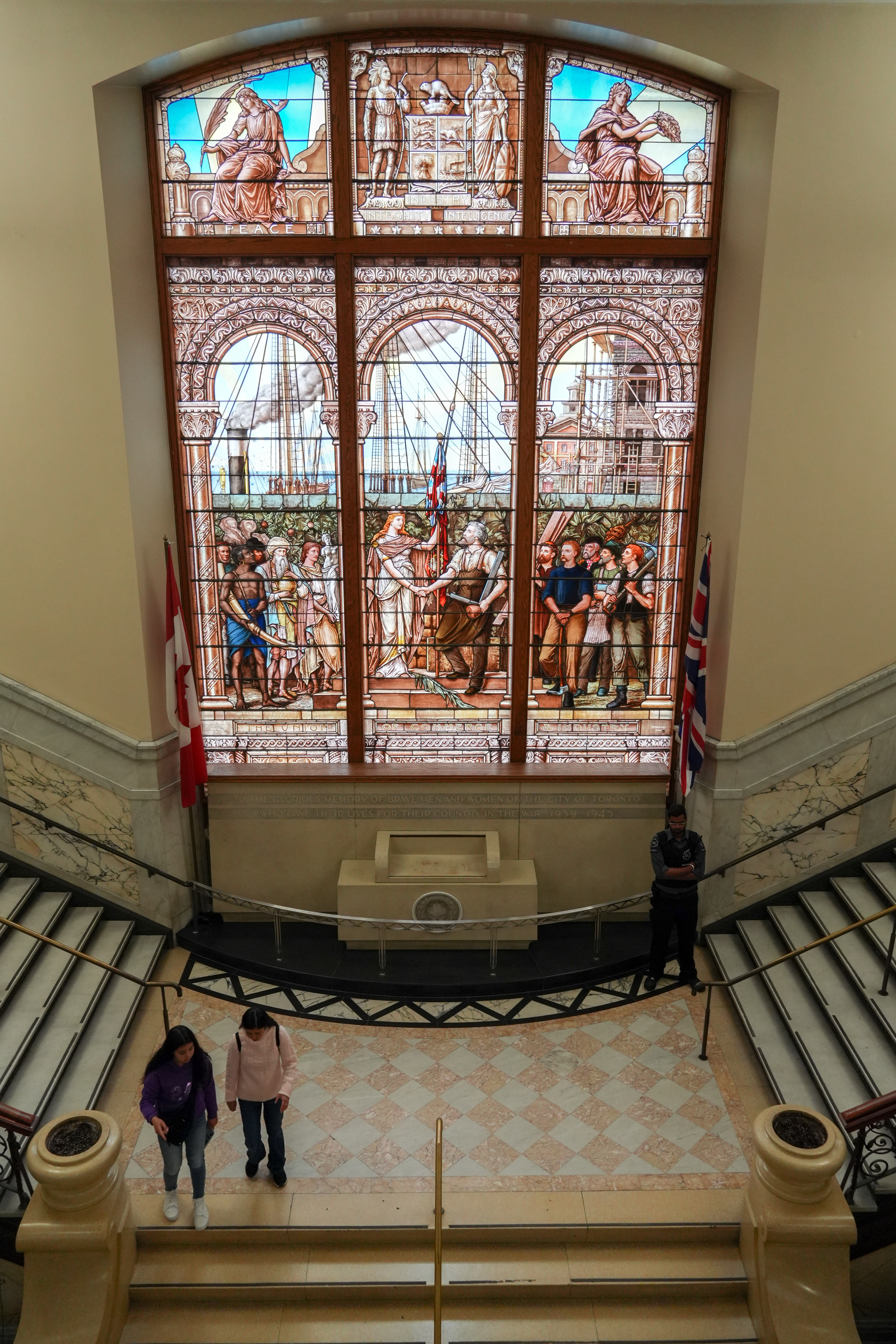
Image of The Union of Commerce and Industry, a stained-glass window directly across the grand staircase of the Old City Hall.

Within the three large oak doorways of the main entrance are steps leading to a two-storey main hall. In the arcade upon entering the building from the main entrance on Queen Street, there are murals designed by George Agnew Reid detailing Toronto's pioneers and angels related to their experiences. On the far left is a mural of Mackenzie, Allan, Macdonnel, Ryerson and Scadding depicting farmers and workers. The spandrel portion of this arcade has four angels painted on it. The first is discovery saying “hail to the pioneers,” the second is fame, saying “to their names and deeds,” the third is fortune which says “remembered and forgotten,” lastly is adventure saying “we honour here.” On the right side of the arcade is another mural depicting Galinee, Simcoe, Tecumseh, Brock, Osgoode, Baldwin, Laura Secord and Strachan depicting pioneers.

Together these murals depict early history of Toronto with the angels representing the four achievements by these pioneers. Directly opposite are a grand staircase and an extraordinary stained-glass window designed by Robert McCausland, the renowned Toronto stained-glass artist. The monumental 16-by-23-foot (4.9 m × 7.0 m) window entitled The Union of Commerce and Industry, depicts civic progress and the "upbuilding" of Toronto. It is organized in three arches and features 12 life-sized figures amidst scenes of the city's waterfront and a depiction of Toronto's second city hall on Front Street East. A marble war memorial is positioned below the window, dedicated to victims of the Second World War. Also in the vicinity is the 4.5 m-wide (15 ft.) divided stairway, leading to a landing branching east and west to what used to be the county and city divisions of the building. Stucco pillars were shaped by Italian craftsmen. Surviving original interior includes detailing in wood, plaster, iron, bronze and marble, including a mosaic floor laid by Jacomo Bespirt and family, columns with plaster capitals, faux-marble finishes, woodwork, wrought-iron grotesques and gas lamp standards, and door knobs bearing the city's old coat of arms.

The main hall in its day was said to be the city's grandest indoor space, amazing visitors. Today, exhibit cabinets that display a collection of photographs and artifacts are found on the main floor of the entrance lobby. Also, when court is not in session, the former Council Chamber, with its spectator gallery above and late 19th-century ambiance, is open to the public.

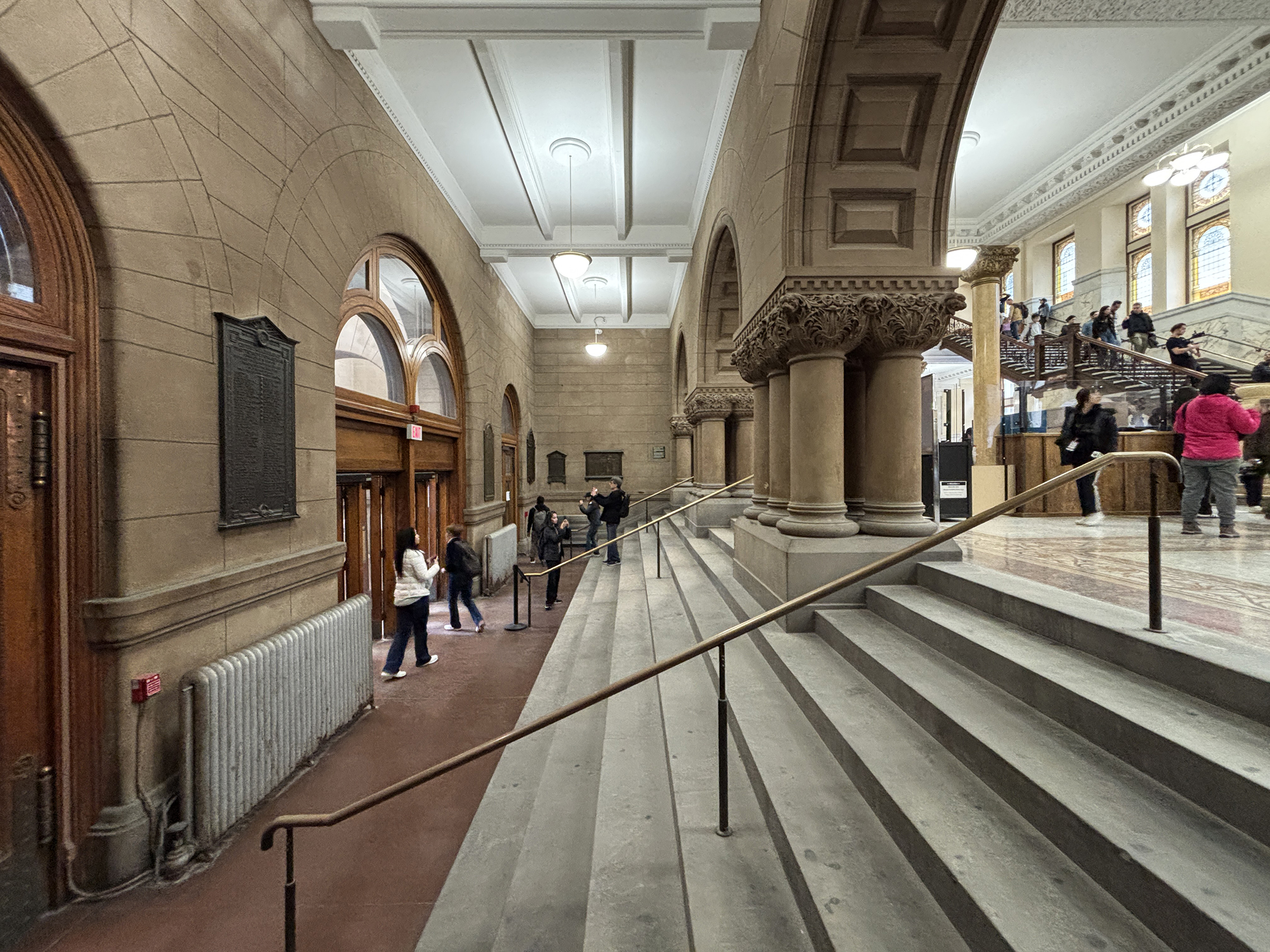
Queen Street entrance stairs

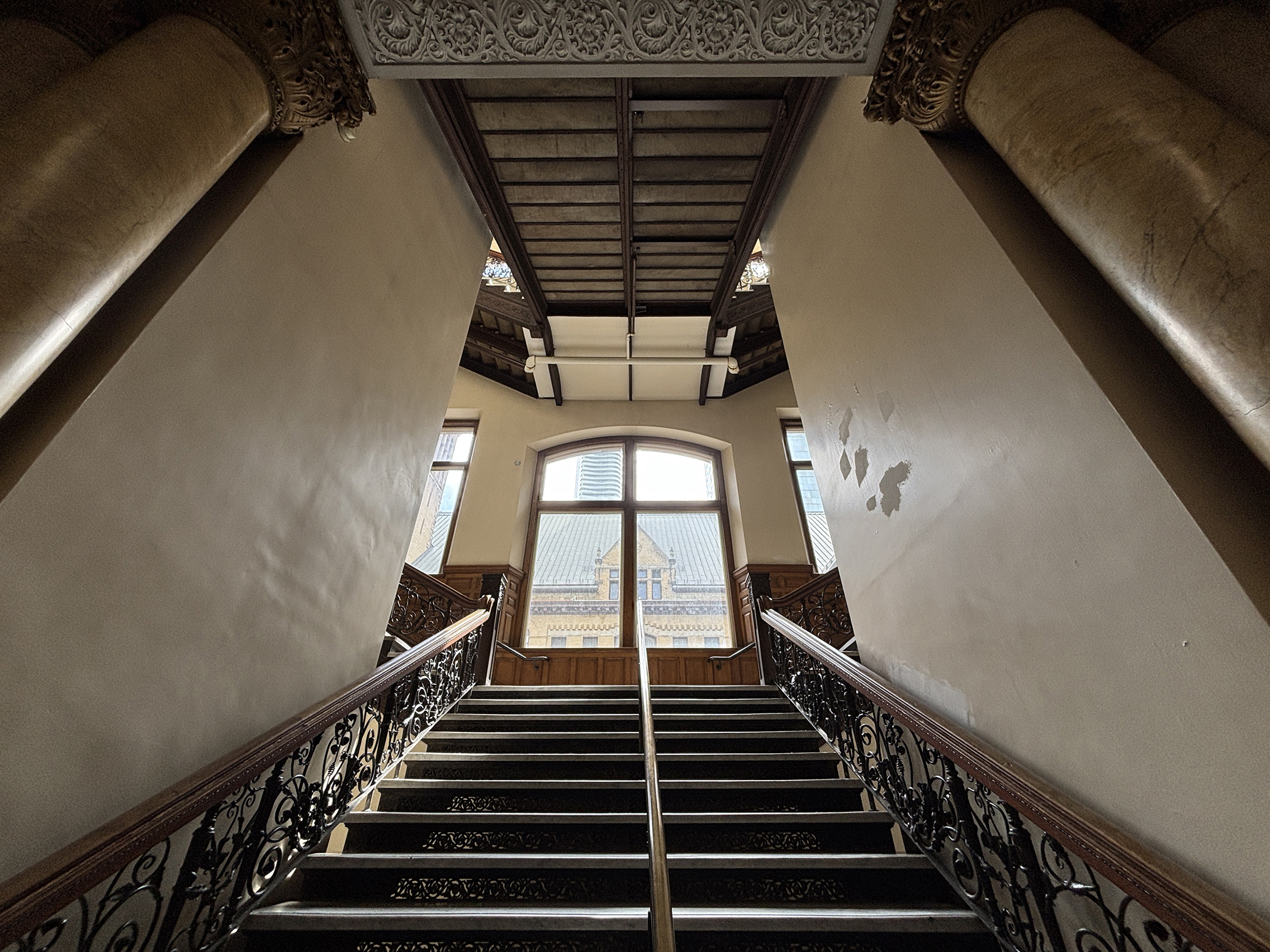
Level 2 stairs to Level 3

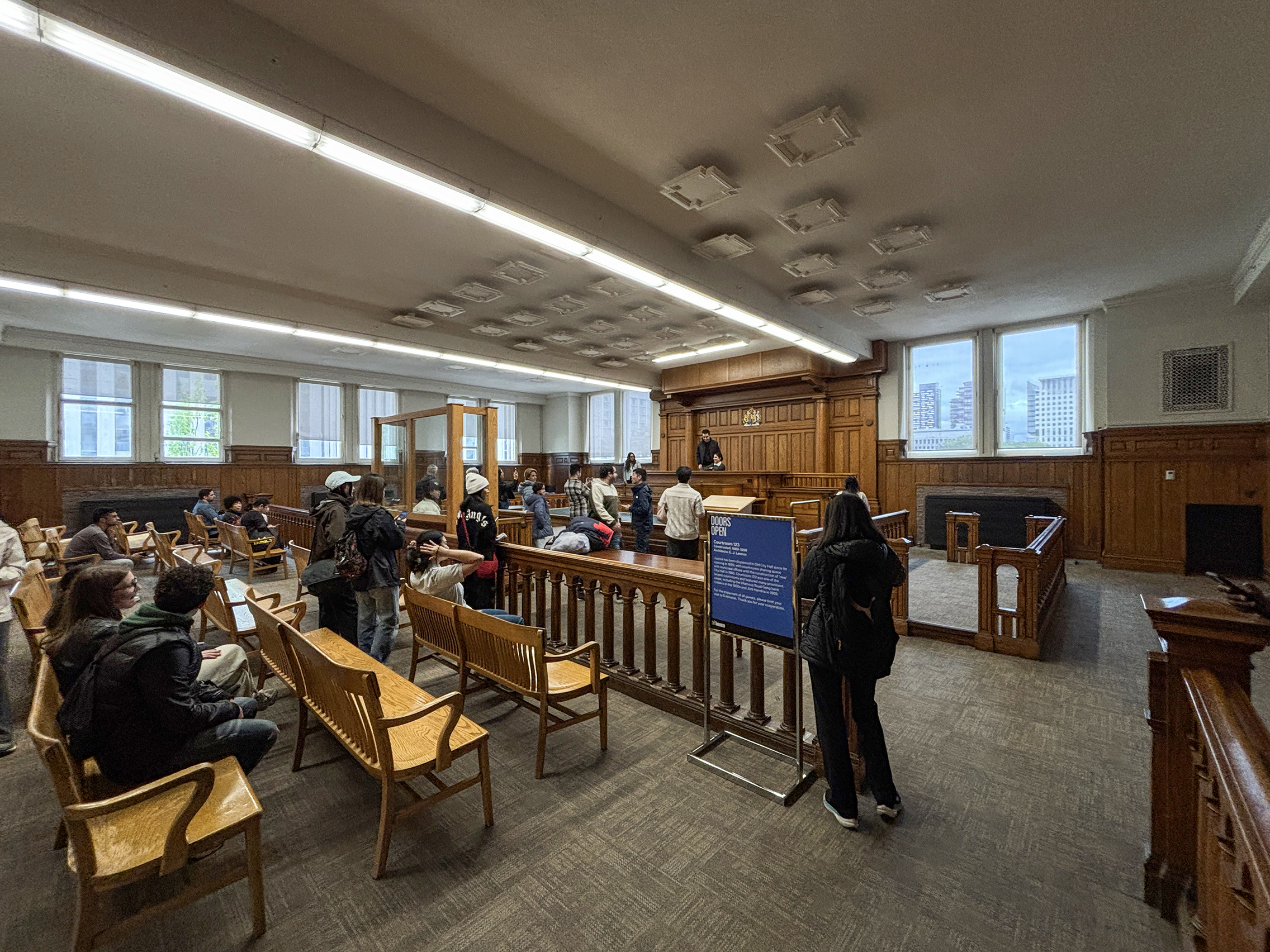
Courtroom 123

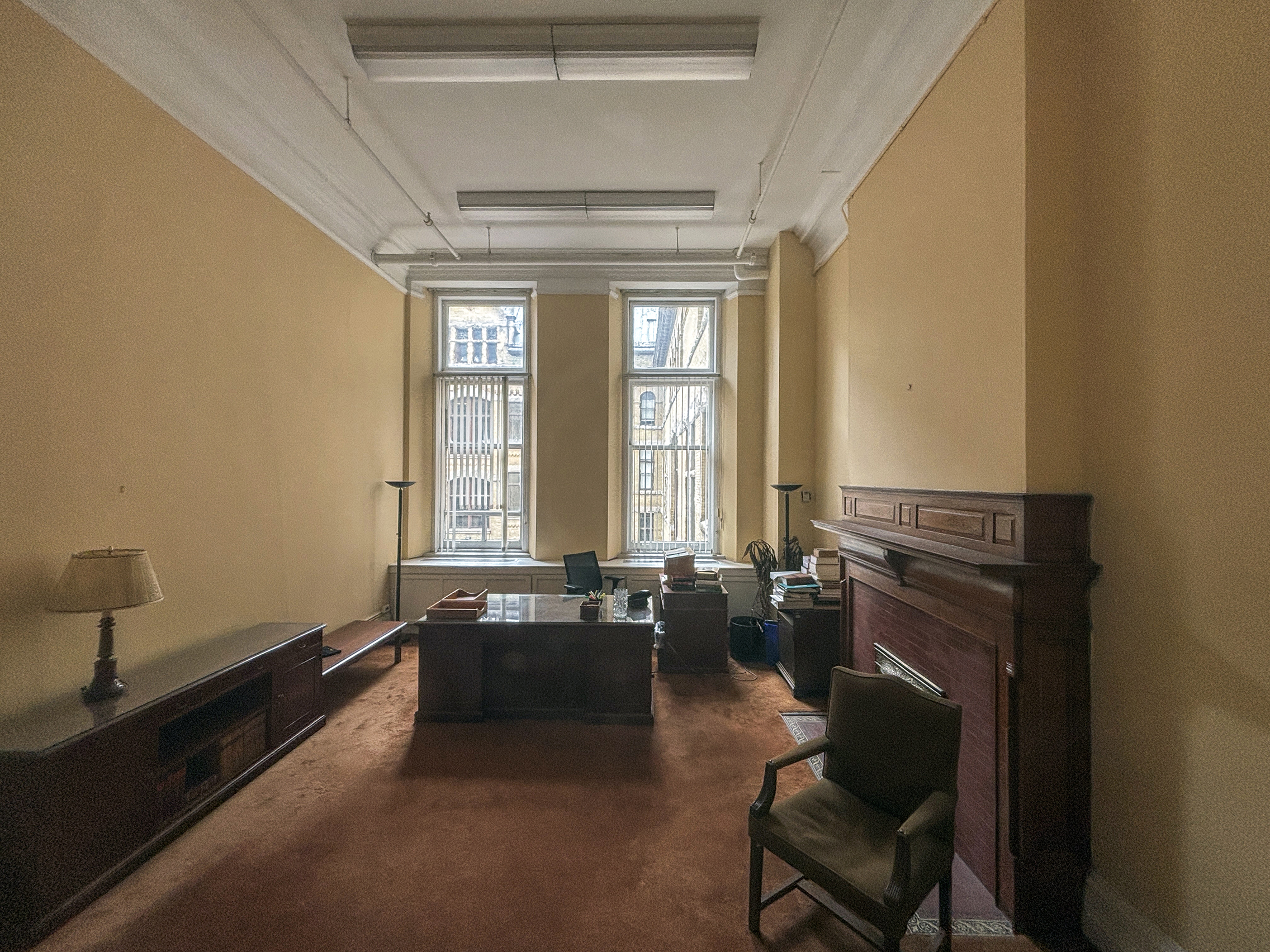
Level 3 office

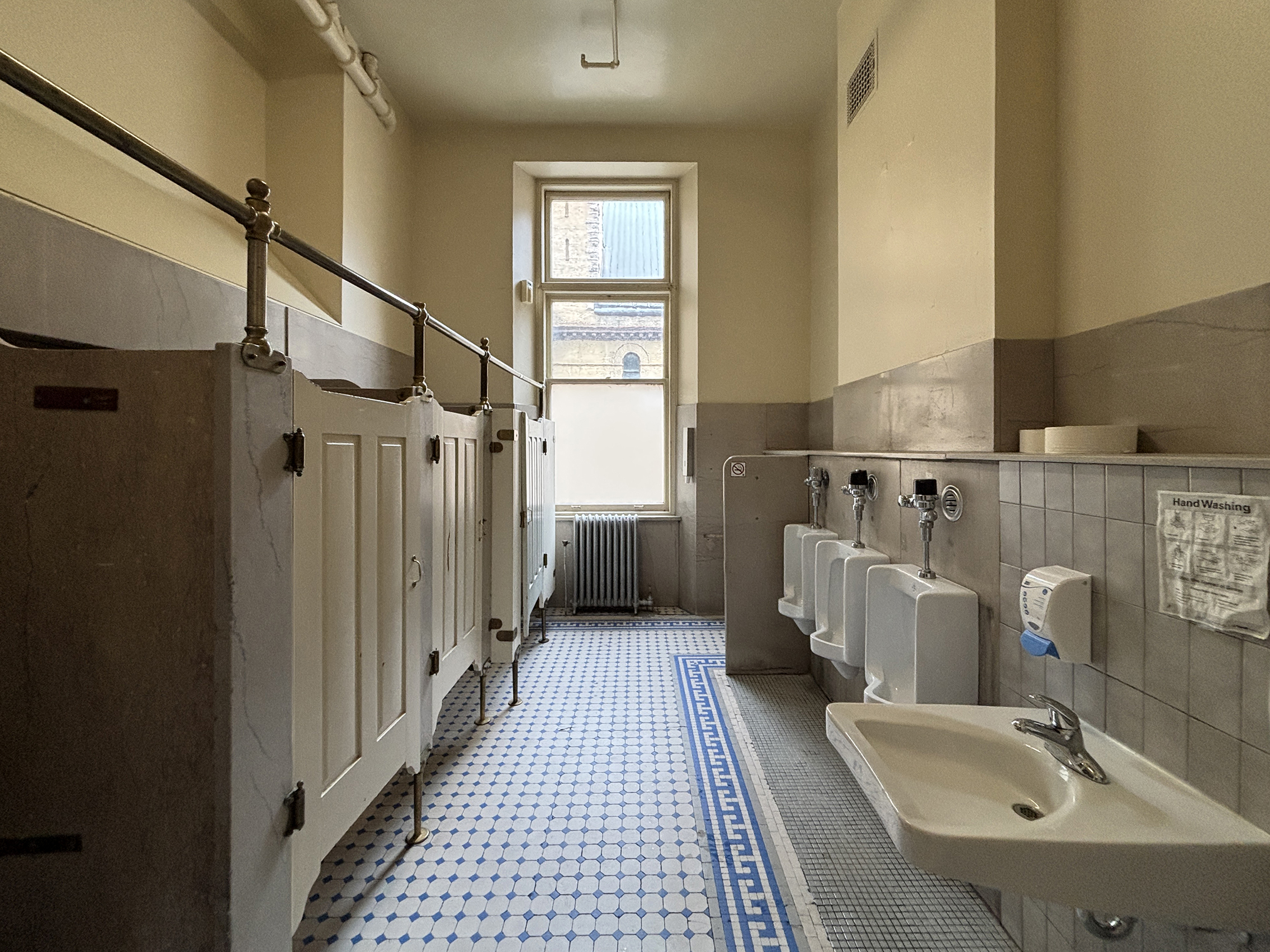
Level 3 washroom

=== Clock tower ===
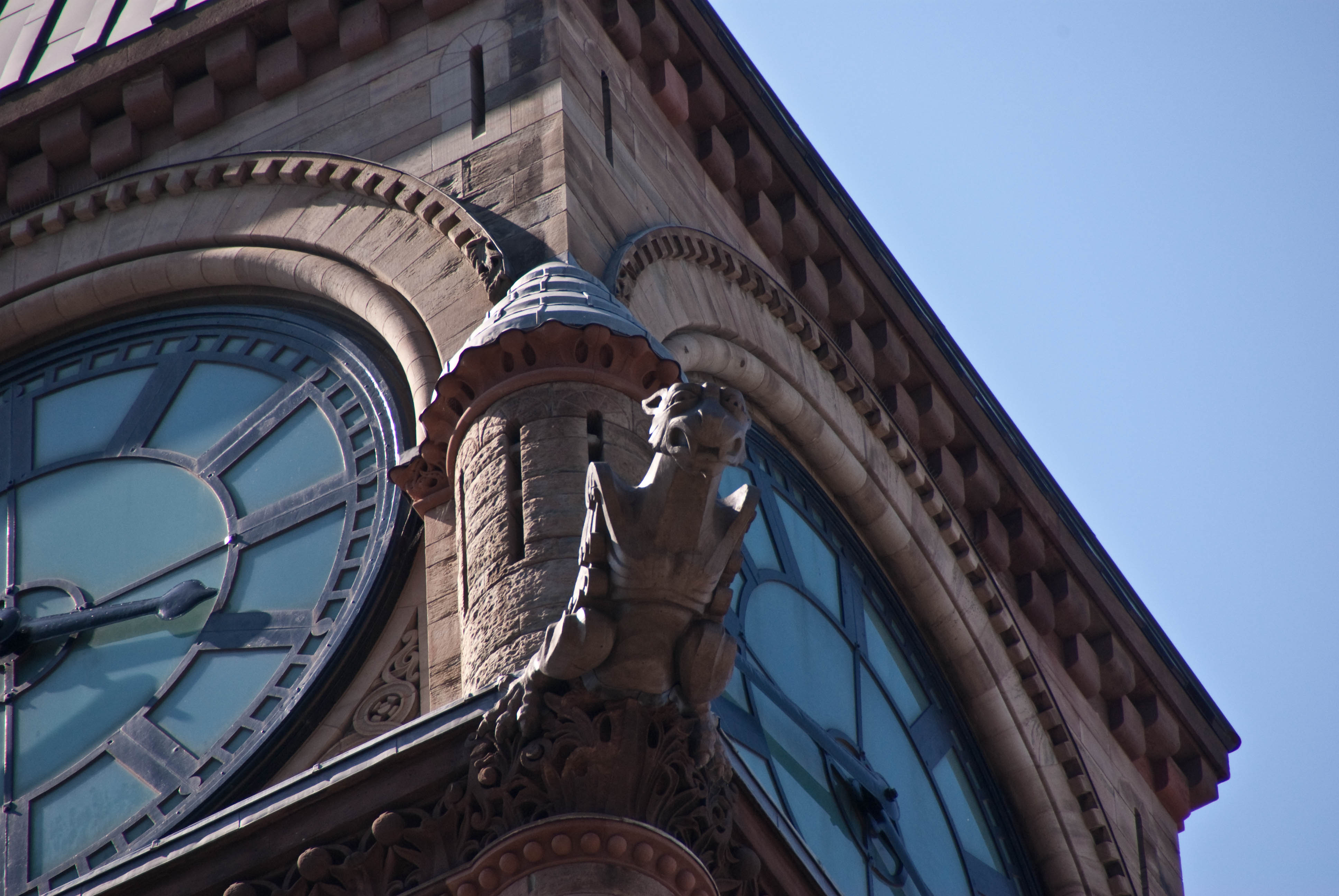
The clock tower at Old City Hall is garnished by four stone gargoyles at the upper corners of the tower.

Old City Hall features a large, 103.6-metre-tall (340 ft) (340 ft) clock tower that is a terminating vista for Bay Street south of Queen Street West and is also prominently visible from Queen Street and Nathan Phillips Square. The clock tower was the tallest structure in Canada for 18 years from 1899 until 1917. The clock was made in Croydon, England, by Gillett & Johnston, for many years, A. G. Abernethy, clockmaker on Yonge Street, was in charge with repairing and maintaining the clock. Four garnished stone gargoyles sat at the upper corners of the clock tower; these ornaments were removed due to the effects of the weather on the sandstone carvings in 1938, but bronze casts of the gargoyles were reinstalled in 2002.

The clock functioned manually until the 1950s when it was automated. In 1992, the clock was stopped for the first time in more than a century to perform maintenance and repairs. The maintenance consisted of painting the metallic components of the clock: its bronze, brass, iron and steel. The room, at the top of the tower, enclosed on four sides by timepieces, houses the glass box in which the clock's mechanism sits. The room is accessible by stairs only; there are 280 steps to climb. The elevator that was built with the structure was taken out in the 1920s. The clock's face measures 6 metres (20 ft) in diameter.

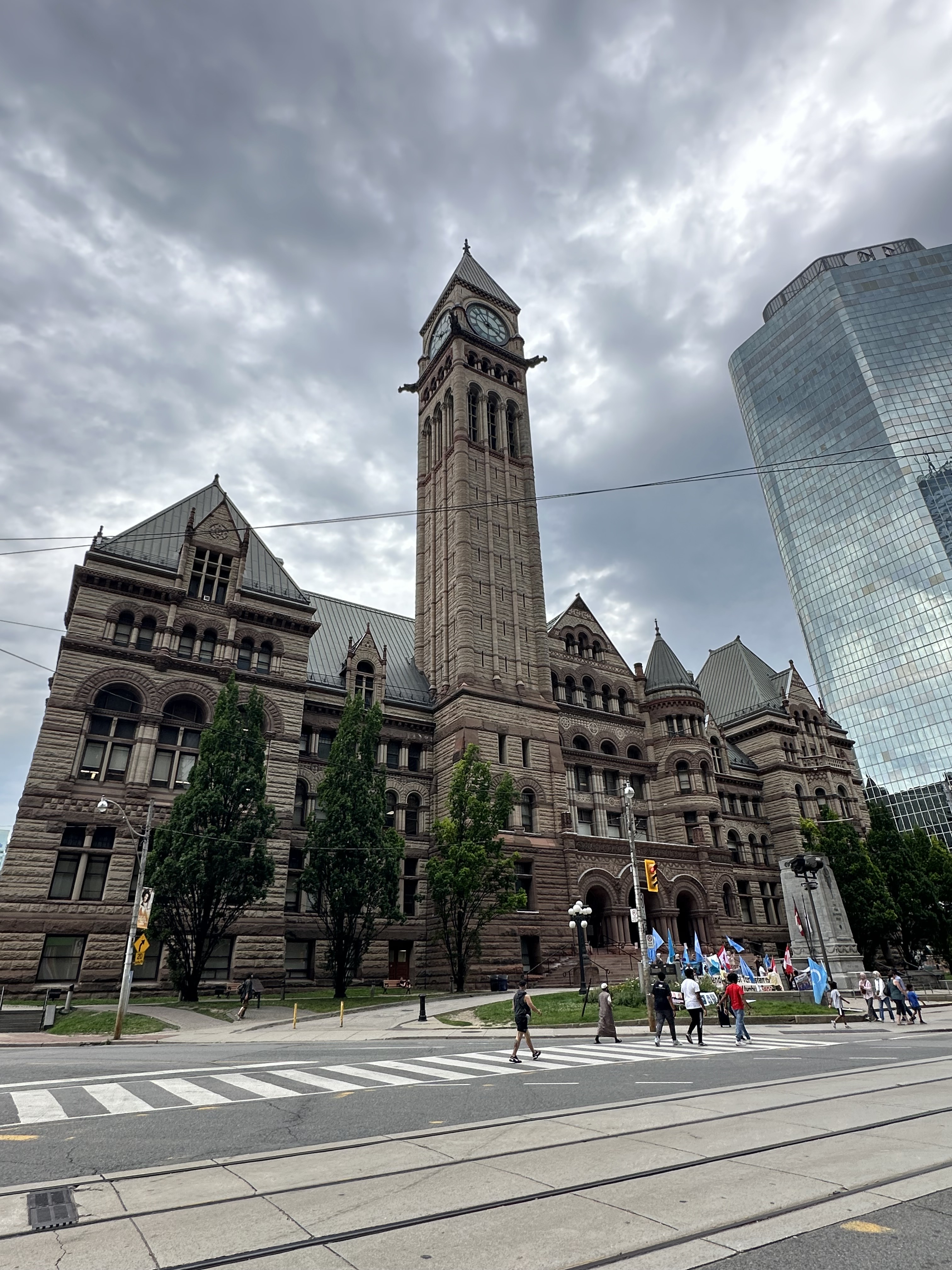
Front of Old City Hall in July 2024

=== Bells ===
The clock room houses three large bells, two small quarter bells that strike every quarter hour and a bourdon bell which strikes every hour, the bourdon alone weighs 5443 kilograms. There is one small and unofficial inscription just below the coat of arms on the bell, which reads “J.K.Oct.18, 1900”. The bourdon also rarely rings for special events like the Bells of Peace program in 2014, which commemorates 100 years since the end of the First World War.

== Appearances in cultural works ==
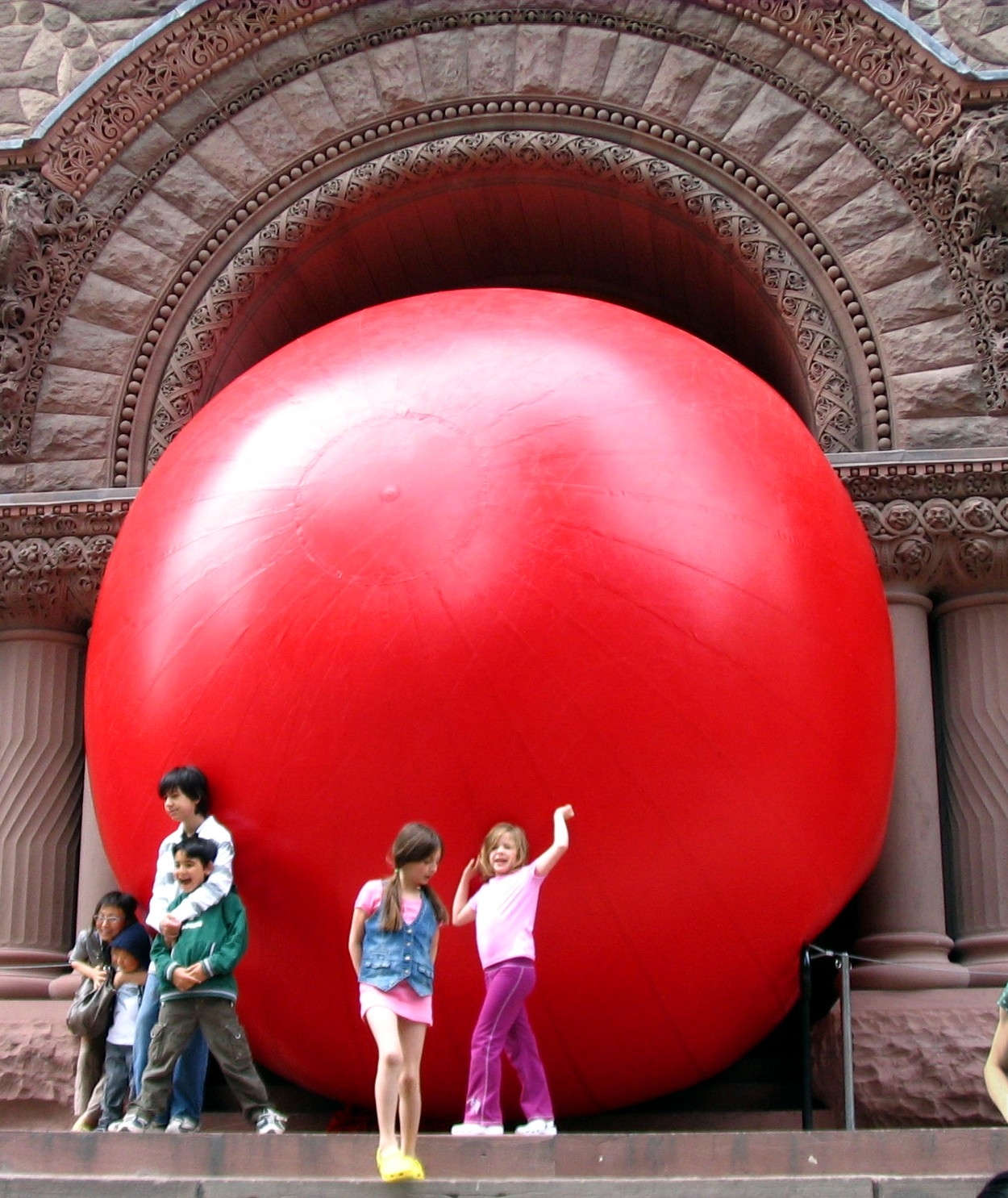
Children pose by one of Kurt Perschke's Redball Project installations in the central arch of the Queen Street main entrance to Old City Hall in 2009.

Artist William Armstrong painted a watercolour painting of Old City Hall prior to its completion. The building features prominently in the novel Old City Hall, by Robert Rotenberg. For the 2009 Luminato arts festival, artist Kurt Perschke brought Redball Project to Toronto and temporarily installed a giant red ball in locations around Toronto's downtown core, including inside the central arch of the main entrance to Old City Hall.

In terms of popular culture, the building is sometimes used to film movies and television shows, such as This is Wonderland, Murdoch Mysteries, Flashpoint, Street Legal, Covert Affairs, and Dirty Pictures. Interiors of the space can be seen in the trial scenes near the end of the 1999 film The Boondock Saints.

Old City Hall appears in the 1981 children's book Jonathan Cleaned Up – Then He Heard a Sound (or Blackberry Subway Jam) by Robert Munsch and illustrated by Michael Martchenko. However in the 1984 animated adaptation produced by the National Film Board, the location is Toronto's new city hall instead.

== See also ==
- Allegheny County Courthouse – influence for Lennox's City Hall design: both buildings have interior courtyards and a similar tower design
- List of tallest structures built before the 20th century

Preceded by St. Lawrence Market South	Toronto City Hall; 1899–1965	Succeeded by Toronto City Hall
