= Old Newmarket Town Hall and Courthouse =

Heritage site in Ontario, Canada

Coordinates: 44.0527°N 79.4578°W

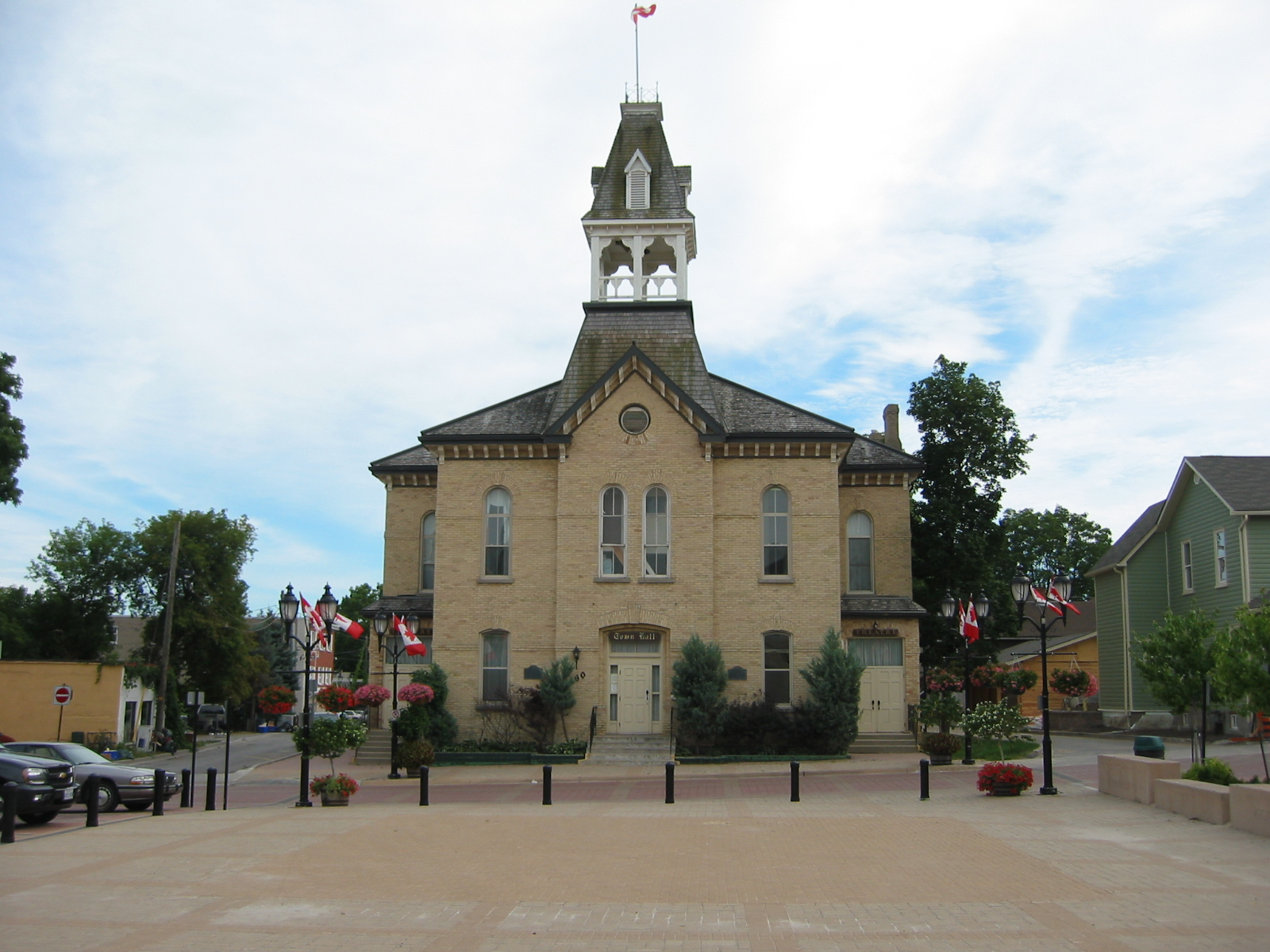
Old Town Hall Newmarket

Old Newmarket Town Hall and Courthouse is a historic structure in Newmarket, Ontario and served as town hall, county offices and courthouse.

== Architecture ==
The structure was designed in the Italianate style by the architectural firm of Mallory & Sons, in accordance with then-Mayor William Cane's desire for a modern building.

== Town hall and county office ==
The building was inaugurated on Dominion Day, July 1, 1883, as town hall for Newmarket, Ontario. It assumed the role as York County offices moved from Toronto City Hall in 1953 when Metropolitan Toronto was formed and until York Region was formed in 1971. Reverting the original role, it was replaced when the town offices moved out in 1975. Some Regional offices relocated to the York Region Administration Centre at 62 Bayview Parkway in 1957.

== Courthouse and community use ==
From 1975 to 1980 it was used as municipal courthouse while a new courthouse was being built at 50 Eagle Street.

After the 1980s the building became a cultural and social venue. The building has undergone renovations in the late 1970s and again in 2011. Scheduled to re-open in the autumn of 2015, the Old Town Hall will function as a cultural hub for theatre, music, dance and other cultural activities; construction includes renovations to the second floor theatre and conversion of the building to make it fully accessible.

The building has been protected as a heritage property since 1999.

== Renovations ==
Since 2012, Newmarket's Old Town Hall had undergone substantial renovations to achieve architectural renaissance. A new atrium extension was added to the south side of the building representing the blending of the old and the new. Renovations and improvements were made throughout the building to make it fully accessible and ensure it functions as a culture hub for theatre, music, dance, arts and cultural activities and numerous opportunities for continued economic

The restoration of Old Town Hall is part of a joint project with the Federal and Provincial government in which the Town of Newmarket received approximately $3.4 million in funding. As a key driver of the Town's Cultural Master Plan, this landmark will act as a hub for arts and culture and will play a key role in the revitalization of Newmarket's Historic Main Street area.
