= List of works by Edwin Lutyens =

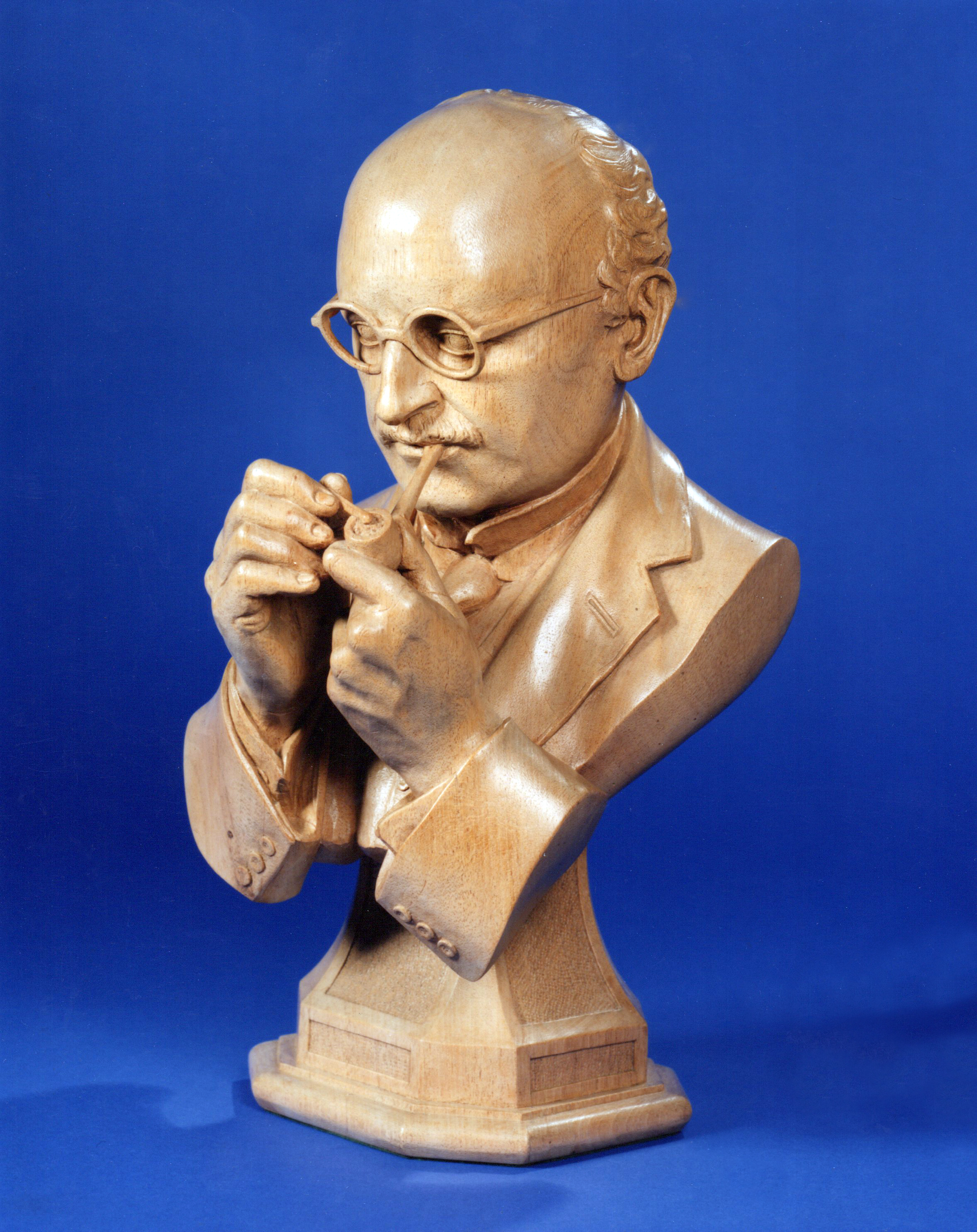
Bust of Sir Edwin Lutyens by Denis Alva Parsons

This list of works by Edwin Lutyens provides brief details of some of the houses, gardens, public buildings and memorials designed by Sir Edwin Landseer Lutyens (1869–1944).

Lutyens was a British architect known for imaginatively adapting traditional architectural styles to the requirements of his era. The architectural historian Gavin Stamp described him as "the greatest British architect of the twentieth (or of any other) century" and English Heritage identify him as "one of the greatest architects the country has ever produced". More than 500 of his creations have been placed on the National Heritage List for England.

== United Kingdom ==
=== Houses and gardens ===
Name	Image	Location	County	Initiated	Completed	Notes
Middleton Park, 51°54′19″N 1°14′18″W		Middleton Stoney	Oxfordshire	1935	1938	Lutyens last country estate. Built for George Child Villiers, 9th Earl of Jersey.
58-59 South Street; 51.5087°N 0.1497°W	58-59 South Street	Mayfair	London	1936		Mid 18th century house remodelled by Lutyens in 1936. Lutyens added a sunken garden to the house.
Abbey House; 54.13869°N 3.20019°W	Abbey House	Barrow-in-Furness	Cumbria	1910	1914	Guest-house built in the Tudor Revival style, of red ashlar and slate, for Vickers Ltd.
Abbotswood; 51.93496°N 1.73796°W	Abbotswood Estate	Lower Swell	Gloucestershire	1901	1901	Alterations to an existing property, and the design of gardens, for Mark Fenwick, a banker and mine owner.
Berrydown Court; 51.2421°N 1.2478°W	Boundary wall at Berrydown Court	Overton	Hampshire	1897	1898	Country house for Archibald Grove. Garden by Gertrude Jekyll with advice from William Robinson.
Castle Drogo; 50.69587°N 3.81115°W	Castle Drogo	Drewsteignton	Devon	1911	1930	English country house borrowing styles of castle-building from the medieval and Tudor periods, along with more minimalist contemporary approaches.
Deanery Garden; 51.47447°N 0.91138°W	Deanery Garden	Sonning	Berkshire	1899	1901	Arts and Crafts style house with garden laid out by Lutyens and planted by garden designer Gertrude Jekyll; one of the several commissions from Edward Hudson, founder of Country Life magazine.
Folly Farm; 51.41574°N 1.09424°W	Folly Farm	Sulhamstead	Berkshire	1906	1912	Built around a 17th-century farmhouse, to which Lutyens made extensions in a neoclassical style around 1906, and then in a vernacular style around 1912, for metals trader Zachary Merton.
Goddards; 51.19676°N 0.39812°W	Goddards	Abinger	Surrey	1898	1900	In a Tudor style, with gardens by Gertrude Jekyll, commissioned for charitable purposes by shipping magnate Frederick Mirrielees.
Heathcote; 53.92456°N 1.83636°W	Heathcote	Ilkley	West Yorkshire	1906	1908	Villa representing Lutyens first comprehensive use of the Neoclassical style, and the precursor of later buildings in Edwardian Baroque style and those of New Delhi. Built for John Thomas Hemingway, wool merchant.
Hestercombe Gardens; 51.05220°N 3.08372°W	Hestercombe Gardens	West Monkton	Somerset	1904	1906	Lutyens and Gertrude Jekyll laid out an Edwardian garden at Hestercombe House between 1904 and 1906 for the Hon E.W.B. Portman,
The Hoo; 50.799167°N 0.253333°W	The Hoo - garden front	Willingdon and Jevington	East Sussex	1901	1902	Earlier house encased and remodelled for a wealthy lawyer. Gardens with contributions by Gertrude Jekyll
Lindisfarne Castle; 55.66902°N 1.78481°W	Lindisfarne Castle	Lindisfarne	Northumberland	1901	1914	16th Century castle remodelled as an Arts and Crafts style family home for Edward Hudson
Little Thakeham; 50.93035°N 0.42322°W	Little Thakeham	Horsham	Sussex	1902	1903	Arts and Crafts style, Grade I listed private house designed for Ernest Blackburn, a pre-school headmaster who inherited a fortune, it is the first in which Lutyens mixed neoclassical architecture into his previously vernacular style.
Marshcourt; 51.10069°N 1.49223°W	Marshcourt	Marsh Court, Stockbridge	Hampshire	1901	1905	Arts and Crafts style in ashlar, with a Tudor exterior employing lines of black flint and red tile. Built for Herbert Johnson, a fortunate London Stock Exchange trader.
Middlefield; 52.1545°N 0.1618°E		Stapleford	Cambridgeshire	1908	1909	Red-brick mansion with prominent chimneystacks and large hipped roofs, designed for Henry Bond, a Cambridge don.
Millmead House; 51.1936°N 0.5601°W		Bramley	Surrey	1904	1907	Small country house built for Gertrude Jekyll
Monkton House; 50.95059°N 0.817601°W		West Dean	West Sussex	1902	1902	For Willie James. Later remodelled by Edward James, utilising the talents of Christopher Nicholson, Hugh Casson and Salvador Dalí to create a rare example of a Surrealist country house.
Munstead Wood; 51.17516°N 0.59648°W		Munstead Heath, Busbridge	Surrey	1889	1897	A very early commission for Gertrude Jekyll, an Arts and Crafts style house inspired by local vernacular architecture.
New Place; 50.9186°N 1.1953°W	New Place	Shirrell Heath	Hampshire	1904	1906	Incorporates the interior of an early 17th century mansion in Bristol. Now a hotel.
Orchards; 51.18002°N 0.58133°W	Orchards, Surrey	Bramley	Surrey	1897	1899	Like Munstead Wood, an Arts and Crafts style house inspired by local vernacular architecture, an early commission for William and Julia Chance.
Overstrand Hall; 52.91863°N 1.33152°E	Overstrand Hall	Overstrand	Norfolk	1899	1901	Pevsner describes it as "one of [Lutyens's] most remarkable buildings" employing a range of materials drawing from diverse architectural styles.
Penheale Manor; 50.6658°N 4.4542°E	Penheale Manor	Egloskerry	Cornwall	1920		Gardens, and extensions with a new wing to the house, for Captain Norman Colville.
Snatchup End Cottages; 51.734064°N 0.464801°E	Snatchup End Cottages	Apsley	Hertfordshire	1898		Irregular grouping of two and three storey cottages in a vernacular style, with tile hung upper floors and gabled, gambrel and hipped tiled roofs.
Tigbourne Court; 51.13255°N 0.63395°W	Tigbourne Court	Wormley	Surrey	1899	1901	In an Arts and Crafts style strongly influenced by local vernacular architecture, built for businessman Edgar Horne. Described by Ian Nairn as "probably [Lutyens's] best" building.

=== Bridges ===
Name	Image	Location	County	Initiated	Completed	Notes
Hampton Court Bridge; 51.40375°N 0.34240°W	Hampton Court Bridge	Hampton and East Molesey	London and Surrey	1928	1933	A three-arch reinforced concrete bridge with brick facings and Portland stone balustraded parapets, abutments and niches, spanning the River Thames near to Hampton Court Palace. Designed with Surrey county engineer W. P. Robinson to reflect the style of Sir Christopher Wren's work at the Palace.
Runnymede Bridge; 51.4375°N 0.534722°W	Runnymede Bridge	Egham and Staines-upon-Thames	Surrey	1939	1961	Encased-steel-arch bridge over the River Thames, designed by 1939 to carry the A30 road; but not constructed for 15-years after Lutyens' death, World War II having intervened. Design details – the use of brick-facing and Portland stone, albeit without niches – follow the style of the Hampton Court Bridge.
Silver Street Bridge; 52.2019°N 0.1154°E	Silver Street Bridge	Cambridge	Cambridgeshire	1932	1959	Over the River Cam in central Cambridge

=== Public buildings ===
Name	Image	Location	County	Initiated	Completed	Notes
100 King Street; 53.48058°N 2.24225°W	100 King Street, Manchester	Manchester	Greater Manchester	1928	1935	A castle-like Art Deco building surrounded on all four sides by roads, and featuring carvings by the local sculptor John Ashton Floyd; built for the Midland Bank.
Benson Court, Magdalene College; 52.20975°N 0.1154°E	Benson Court	Cambridge	Cambridgeshire		1932	Student accommodation.
BMA House; 51.52592°N 0.12893°W	BMA House	Tavistock Square	London	1911	1925	Headquarters building originally designed for the Theosophical Society with construction taken over by the British Medical Association
Country Life Building 51.511387°N 0.121681°W		Westminster	London	1904		Commission by Edward Hudson as the headquarters of Country Life. Now known as Hudson House.
Free Church; 51.5811°N 0.190864°W		Hampstead Garden Suburb	London	1908	1910	Opposite side of Central Square to St Jude's Church. Grade I listed.
Grosvenor Estate; 51.49393°N 0.13019°W	A view of grosvenor estate buildings from Page Street.	Westminster	London	1928	1930	This 600-dwelling estate is the only housing project of Lutyens. It is composed of seven U-shaped five- and six-storey buildings, recognizable by their chess-board like façade. The estate's status was the subject of a 1990 legal case, Westminster City Council v Duke of Westminster.
Henrietta Barnett School; 51.5811°N 0.1892°W	Henrietta Barnett School	Hampstead Garden Suburb	London		1911	Girls' Grammar school founded in 1911 by Dame Henrietta Barnett.
Linden Lodge School; 51.44370°N 0.21320°W	Linden Lodge	Wimbledon	London	1934	1934	Residential school for visually-impaired children
Midland Bank, Poultry; 51.513663°N 0.090169°W	Midland Bank	Poultry	City of London	1924	1929	Bank headquarters, now a hotel
St Mary's Church; 51.23964°N 0.31648°W		Pixham, Dorking	Surrey		1903	Chapel of ease to Dorking parish church, having a barrel-vaulted ceiling. Grade II* listed.
St Jude's Church; 51.5801°N 0.190031°W		Hampstead Garden Suburb	London	1908	1910	Opposite side of Central Square to Free Church. Grade I listed.

=== Memorials ===
Name	Image	Location	County	Initiated	Completed	Notes
Abinger Common War Memorial; 51.20146°N 0.40552°W	Abinger Common War Memorial	Abinger Common	Surrey		1920, 1949	Lutyens' War Cross design; the original 1920 erection was destroyed by bombing in 1944, and a replacement cross erected in 1949.
Arch of Remembrance; 52.62343°N 1.12156°W		Leicester	Leicestershire	1919	1925	A monumental tetrapylon quadrifrons triumphal arch in a railed enclosure; Lutyens was selected as architect by the War memorial Committee.
Ashwell War Memorial; 52.04316°N 0.14595°W		Ashwell	Hertfordshire	1919	1922	Lutyens' War Cross design, the commission offered to a shortlist of three providers, Lutyens being selected.
British Thomson-Houston Company War Memorial; 52.38277°N 1.25509°W		Rugby	Warwickshire	1921	1921	Lutyens' War Cross design, commissioned by the British Thomson-Houston Company to honour its employee war-dead.
Busbridge War Memorial; 51.17751°N 0.60210°W		Busbridge	Surrey		1922	Lutyens connection to Busbridge was with Gertrude Jekyll, for whom he designed Munstead Wood on the outskirts of the village. The memorial is of Lutyens' War Cross design.
The Cenotaph; 51.50267°N 0.12609°W	The Cenotaph, Whitehall, London	Whitehall	London	1919	1920	The site of the British annual National Service of Remembrance. Originally a wood-and-plaster structure designed by Lutyens and erected in 1919, later replaced by a replica in Portland stone and taking the form of a pylon rising in a series of set-backs to an empty tomb (cenotaph) on its summit. The model for cenotaphs around the world.
Civil Service Rifles War Memorial; 51.51039°N 0.11761°W		Central London	London		1926	
Dame Louisa Aldrich-Blake Memorial; 51.524733°N 0.128188°W	Dame Louisa Aldrich-Blake Memorial	Tavistock Square	London		1926	Two identical bronze busts by Arthur George Walker on a stone plinth with semicircular bench and seatback.
Devon County War Memorial; 50.72265°N 3.53151°W		Exeter	Devon		1921	30-foot (9.1-metre) granite cross, quarried from Haytor on Dartmoor, and hewn from a single stone—the largest Lutyens was able to acquire; situated outside and in line with the central axis of Exeter Cathedral. This is one of the 15 Lutyens War Cross designs.
Edward and Tom Thynne headstones 50.8729°N 0.423°W		Findon	West Sussex		1925	Headstone marking Edward Thynne grave at the Muntham Court Estate burial ground. The same design was used for Edward‘s brother Tom.
Fordham War Memorial; 52.31147°N 0.39055°E		Fordham	Cambridgeshire		1921	Doric column in Portland stone surmounted by a bronze statue of Saint George, sculpted by Sir George Frampton, who also contributed the sculpture for Hove War Memorial.
Francis McLaren headboard 51.17693°N 0.60139°W		Busbridge	Surrey			Carved oak headboard marking the grave of Francis McLaren, son-in-law of Agnes Jekyll.
Gerrards Cross Memorial Building; 51.58358°N 0.55169°W		Gerrards Cross	Buckinghamshire		1922	Single story community-centre, with a memorial plaque sheltered beneath a portico supported by four doric columns
Hannen Columbarium; 51.49948°N 0.87339°W	Hannen Columbarium	Wargrave	Berkshire	1905	1907	Columbarium combining Byzantine Revival with Arts and Crafts and with classical architectural lines, in the form of a 12 feet (3.7 m) square building of red-brick, red-tile, glass-tile and stonework. Lutyen's earliest mausoleum design, recognised as an embodyment of the point at which he fully incorporated classical architecture in his designs.
Hartburn War Memorial; 55.16891°N 1.86176°W	Hartburn War memorial	Hartburn	Northumberland		1921	Lutyens' War Cross design, commissioned by Mr and Mrs Straker of nearby Angerton Hall, the gardens of which Lutyens renovated with Gertrude Jekyll in 1904.
Holy Island War Memorial; 55.66828°N 1.80065°W	Holy Island War Memorial	Lindisfarne	Northumberland		1922	A grade II* listed First World War memorial in local pink ashlar stone, recognised as part of a "national collection" of Lutyens memorials. One of 15 War Cross designs by Lutyens.
Hove War Memorial; 50.82683°N 0.16867°W		Hove	Sussex		1921	Bronze statue of Saint George holding a sword by the blade below the hilt, sculpted by Sir George Frampton, standing on a grey granite Doric column. Frampton was also the sculptor for Fordham War Memorial
Jekyll family memorial 51.17694°N 0.60135°W		Busbridge	Surrey			Gravestones and memorial commemorating Gertrude Jekyll, Agnes Jekyll and Herbert Jekyll.
King's Somborne War Memorial; 51.07735°N 1.48727°W		King's Somborne	Hampshire		1922	Lutyens' War Cross design; his connection with the village was Herbert Johnson, for whom he designed Marshcourt
Lancashire Fusiliers War Memorial; 53.59226°N 2.29872°W		Bury	Greater Manchester		1922	Single tall, tapering obelisk in Portland stone (similar to the pair on Lutyens' Northampton War Memorial) standing on a square base with a cornice, below which is a carved frieze on a pedestal of two rectangular blocks, mounted on a rectangular plinth and at the very bottom are two shallow circular steps.
Leeds Rifles War Memorial; 53.79532°N 1.53543°W		Leeds	West Yorkshire		1921	Small version of the Lutyens' War Cross, set into the church wall of Leeds Minster and facing out onto Kirkgate, in Portland stone. The memorial incorporates a stone bench which doubles as a platform for wreaths.
Lower Swell War Memorial; 51.92801°N 1.74871°W	Lower Swell War Memorial	Lower Swell	Gloucestershire		1921	Sculptured urn design. Lutyens' connection with the village was with Mark Fenwick, for whom Lutyens renovated the nearby Abbotswood house.
Manchester Cenotaph; 53.47870°N 2.24295°W		Manchester	Greater Manchester	1922	1924	Cenotaph, flanked by twin obelisks, and a Stone of Remembrance, all in Portland stone on a raised coved platform; reminiscent of his earlier cenotaph in Southampton
Mells War Memorial; 51.24090°N 2.38933°W		Mells	Somerset		1920	Tuscan column of Purbeck Marble on which stands a statue of Saint George slaying a dragon. The memorial is one of many buildings and structures by Lutyens in the village by Lutyens for the Horner and Asquith families.
The Merchant Navy War Memorial, First World War section 51.50957°N 0.07763°W		Tower Hill	London		1928	Lutyens designed a World War I memorial taking the form of a Doric temple, raised on a platform slightly above street level, oriented east to west and situated in Trinity Square Gardens on Tower Hill, within sight of the Tower of London. The memorial's Second World War section designed by Edward Maufe was constructed to adjoin and complement Lutyens design.
Midland Railway War Memorial; 52.91550°N 1.46490°W		Derby	Derbyshire		1921	10-metre (33-foot) high cenotaph in the centre of a 2-metre (6.6-foot) screen wall forming rectangular alcoves on each side. At the top of the cenotaph is a recumbent effigy of an unknown soldier, partially covered by his greatcoat and with his helmet and bayonet at his feet.
Miserden War Memorial; 51.77857°N 2.09385°W		Miserden,	Gloucestershire		1920	Typical Lutyens War Cross with a tapering shaft and short arms, of limestone construction.
Muncaster War Memorial; 54.35760°N 3.40104°W	Muncaster War Memorial	Muncaster	Cumbria		1922	Lutyens' War Cross design; his connection with the village was Sir John Ramsden, for whom he consulted on Muncaster Castle
North Eastern Railway War Memorial; 53.95868°N 1.08979°W		York	North Yorkshire		1924	Single, 30-foot (9-metre) obelisk rising from a three-tiered pedestal set into the rear portion of a three-sided screen wall.
Northampton War Memorial; 52.23729°N 0.89574°W		Northampton	Northamptonshire		1926	A Stone of Remembrance flanked by tall twin obelisks, each adorned with a pair of painted stone flags.
Norwich War Memorial; 52.62858°N 1.29234°E		Norwich	Norfolk		1927	The memorial is of Portland stone construction, and comprises a low screen wall on top of which is a cenotaph topped with a carved wreath; it is the last of eight cenotaphs by Lutyens.
Oxfordshire and Buckinghamshire Light Infantry War Memorial; 51.73233°N 1.22830°W		Oxford	Oxfordshire		1923	The memorial consists of a single obelisk mounted on a moulded pedestal and a plain square base, approached by three shallow steps.
Queen's Own Royal West Kent Regiment Cenotaph; 51.27715°N 0.52037°E		Maidstone	Kent		1921	A two-thirds scale replica of Whitehall's cenotaph and unadorned by flags.
Rolvenden War Memorial; 51.05085°N 0.63060°E	Rolvenden War Memorial	Rolvenden	Kent		1922	Unique amongst Lutyens' cross designs, being slender and sparse compared with his conventional War Cross designs; his connection with the village was Harold Tennant for whom he had designed the nearby Great Maytham Hall
Rochdale Cenotaph; 53.61628°N 2.15971°W		Rochdale	Greater Manchester		1922	Comprising two elements: a 10-metre (33 ft) pylon and a Stone of Remembrance formed from light grey Cornish granite which are raised on a platform (stylobate) of three steps.
Royal Berkshire Regiment War Memorial; 51.45826°N 1.00439°W		Reading	Berkshire		1921	Customary Lutyens' cenotaph memorial, standing on a base of three steps and in Portland stone; at the very top of the structure is an urn.
Royal Naval Division War Memorial; 51.50535°N 0.12908°W		Whitehall	London		1925	An obelisk rising from a circular bowl, supported by a moulded square base which connects to a second, shallower bowl and then to a large square plinth.
Sandhurst War Memorial; 51.02682°N 0.56318°E	Sandhurst War Memorial	Sandhurst	Kent		1923	A Lutyens' War Cross design; Lutyens connection with the village was a local resident, James Wilson
Southampton Cenotaph; 50.90965°N 1.40515°W		Southampton	Hampshire		1920	The design is a pylon surmounted by a sarcophagus bearing a recumbent effigy of a fallen soldier—raised on five stone steps; in front of the cenotaph is a Stone of Remembrance raised on two further steps.
South African War Memorial; 51.45690°N 0.28662°W		Richmond	Surrey		1921	A cenotaph, constructed in coarse granite to a design modelled on the Whitehall cenotaph. Unusually among Lutyens' memorials, it has a triangular top. It has a flared base and sits on a base of two stone steps, in contrast to the three on which most of Lutyens' memorials stand.
Southend-on-Sea War Memorial; 51.53423°N 0.70495°E		Southend-on-Sea	Essex		1921	Lutyens first proposed a cenotaph for Southend-on-Sea, but changed his plans to deliver a tapering Portland stone obelisk rising to approximately 11 metres (36 feet) tall, sitting on a square base with a moulded cornice above a rectangular pedestal of six unequal-sized stones, all similar in form to his contemporaneous North Eastern Railway War Memorial.
Spalding War Memorial; 52.78353°N 0.14927°W		Spalding	Lincolnshire		1922	Spalding's memorial takes the form of a brick pavilion in front of which is a 12 feet (3.7 metres) long Stone of Remembrance; both are situated at the head of a long reflecting pool, which incorporates the remains of an 18th-century canal. Lutyens' commission came from Barbara Freyberg, who lost her husband in the Great War, and who was a niece of Lutyens' garden-designer colleague and client Gertrude Jekyll.
Stockbridge War Memorial; 51.11341°N 1.48763°W	Stockbridge War Memorial	Stockbridge	Hampshire		1922	Lutyens' War Cross design; his connection with the village (as with King's Somborne) was Herbert Johnson, for whom he designed Marshcourt
Wargrave War Memorial; 51.49926°N 0.87210°W	Wargrave War memorial	Wargrave	Berkshire		1922	Lutyens' War Cross design, commissioned by a 1919 public meeting, possibly influenced by Lutyens' connections with the Hannon family for whom he also designed the Hannen Columbarium
Welch Regiment War Memorial; 51.49831°N 3.18419°W		Cardiff	South Glamorgan		1924	Originally planned as a memorial to be erected near Gheluvelt on the Western Front in Belgium, Lutyens' design for a cenotaph in Portland stone standing on a stepped plinth and a square base was instead erected at Maindy Barracks in Cardiff.
York City War Memorial; 53.95993°N 1.08952°W		York	North Yorkshire		1925	Lozenge-shaped shafted cross with short, chamfered arms. One of the fifteen War Cross designs. Lutyens' work extends to the entrance gates and supporting piers. The memorial project proved controversial prior to and throughout Lutyens' involvement: whether the memorial should be utilitarian or monumental; and whether the proposed monument and its situation would be in keeping with York architecture.

== India ==
Lutyens was invited, with others, in 1912 to advise the Government of India on planning for a proposed new centre of government to be built in Delhi and named New Delhi. He became the project's leading architect, giving rise to Lutyens' Delhi, encompassing the street plan and key government buildings, and his name is lent to the Lutyens Bungalow Zone of domestic properties for government officers (albeit Lutyens was directly responsible for the design of only four of the houses). A number of other architects, notably Herbert Baker, were responsible for the city's other key buildings.

Name	Image	Initiated	Completed	Notes
Baroda House; 28.61685°N 77.23047°E	Baroda House	1921	1936	Residence of the Maharaja of Baroda in Delhi
Hyderabad House; 28.61601°N 77.22789°E	Hyderabad House	1926	1928	Residence of Osman Ali Khan, Nizam VII, an amalgam of the Mughal and European architecture
India Gate; 28.61290°N 77.22951°E	India Gate	1917	1931	A memorial to the dead of the British India Army in World War I, in the form of a triumphal arch.
Jaipur Column; 28.614262°N 77.201902°E	name=Jaipur Column	1912	1930	Monumental column celebrating the 1911 Delhi Durbar and the transfer of the capital of India from Calcutta to Delhi.
Janpath; 28.61432°N 77.21854°E	Janpath		1931	Janpath – "people's way" – is the main north–south road through New Delhi, the layout of which was planned by Lutyens.
National Archives of India; 28.61546°N 77.21716°E	National Archive			One of a planned four museum buildings to occupy quadrants around the intersection of Janpath and Rajpath, the National Archives building was the only one constructed.
Patiala House; 28.61536°N 77.23474°E	Patiala House			The former residence of the Maharaja of Patiala, now a district court building.
Rajpath; 28.61352°N 77.21729°E	Rajpath		1931	Rajpath – "King's way" – is an east–west ceremonial boulevard through the centre of New Delhi, linking Rashtrapathi Bhavan with India Gate, and location for the annual Delhi Republic Day parade.
Rashtrapathi Bhavan; 28.61440°N 77.19948°E	Rashtrapathi Bhavan	1912	1929	Designed as the Viceroy's House for the Governor-General of India during the British Raj period, and now the official home of the President of India

== Ireland ==
Name	Image	Location	County	Initiated	Completed	Notes
Howth Castle; 53.3863°N 6.079°W	Howth Castle	Howth	Fingal		1910	Renovation and extension to a fourteenth-century castle
Irish National War Memorial Gardens; 53.344°N 6.317°W	Irish National War Memorial	Islandbridge	County Dublin	1930	1940	The design involved a bridge over the railway at the top of the site, a memorial cross, a flat grassed area with the stone at the centre and an (unbuilt) bridge over the River Liffey at the bottom of the site.
Lambay Castle; 53.3863°N 6.079°W	Lamby Castle	Lambay Island	County Dublin	1905	1912	The works consisted of the renovation of the old castle, erecting residential wing, enclosing wall, war memorial, workers village, family houses, Kings tennis court, reconfiguration of the church etc.
Tranarossan House; 55.2292°N 7.8037°W	Tranarossan House	near Downings	County Donegal	-		Now Trá na Rosann youth hostel
Costelloe Lodge; 53.2787°N 9.5368°W	–	Casla (Costelloe)	County Galway	–	–	Built for J. Bruce Ismay, chairman of the White Star Line, much-criticised survivor of the sinking of the Titanic.
Heywood House Gardens; 52.8843°N 7.3008°W	Heywood House Gardens	Ballinakill	County Laois	–	–	New gardens for an existing house for Sir Hutcheson Poë

== France ==
Name	Image	Location	Department	Initiated	Completed	Notes
Australian National Memorial; 49.8869°N 2.5128°E		Villers-Bretonneux	Somme	1935	1938	Memorial to Australian military personnel killed on the Western Front during World War I, listing names of over 10,000 soldiers of the Australian Imperial Force with no known grave. Lutyens also designed the cemetery.
Bethune Town Cemetery50.538611°N 2.645167°E		Béthune	Pas-de-Calais	1917	1918	Town cemetery maintained by the Commonwealth War Graves Commission.
Bois des Moutiers; 49.91182°N 0.98326°E	Bois des Moutiers	Varengeville-sur-Mer	Normandy	1911	1930	Remodelling of an existing 1850s house in the Arts and Crafts style by Lutyens, with gardens laid out by Lutyens and Gertrude Jekyll.
Thiepval Memorial; 50.05058°N 2.68573°E	Thiepval Memorial	Thiepval	Picardy	1928	1932	Memorial to 72,195 British and South African men who died in the Battles of the Somme of the First World War between 1915 and 1918 and have no known grave.

== Italy ==
Name	Image	Location	Initiated	Completed	Notes
British School at Rome; 41.918772°N 12.481386°E	British School at Rome	Rome	1912	1916	Built on the site of the British Pavilion at the 1911 International Exhibition of Art to provide a permanent residential research institute. The design appears to be an almost complete replica of the upper floor of the front facade of St. Paul's Cathedral in London.

== South Africa ==
Name	Image	Location	Initiated	Completed	Notes
Anglo-Boer War Memorial; 26.164°S 28.041°E	Anglo-Boer War Memorial	Johannesburg	1910	1914	Originally called the Rand Regiments Memorial, this arch was erected in honour of the British soldiers who fell in the second Anglo-Boer War.
Johannesburg Art Gallery; 26.197039°S 28.047104°E	Thiepval Memorial	Johannesburg	1910	1915	An Art Gallery in Johannesburg designed by Edwin Lutyens with Robert Howden working as supervising architect. It is the largest art gallery in South Africa.

== United States ==
Name	Image	Location	State	Initiated	Completed	Notes
British Ambassador's residence 38.92109°N 77.06300°W		Northwest Washington	District of Columbia	1925	1928	An example of Queen Anne architecture, the embassy residence was the only building Lutyens designed in North America.

== Unrealised work ==
Name	Image	Location	Country	Initiated	Completed	Notes
Liverpool Metropolitan Cathedral; 53.40498°N 2.96850°W		Liverpool	UK	1930	1958	Lutyens was commissioned to design a new Cathedral, but rising costs caused the abandonment of the scheme; his design for the crypt was realised and completed in 1958.
Liffey Art Gallery		Dublin	Ireland	Sir Hugh Lane		Intended to house the city Art gallery, but the City Councillors did not want to obstruct the view up the river.
