= Marsh Court =

Hamlet in Hampshire, England

Coordinates: 51.10190°N 1.49387°W

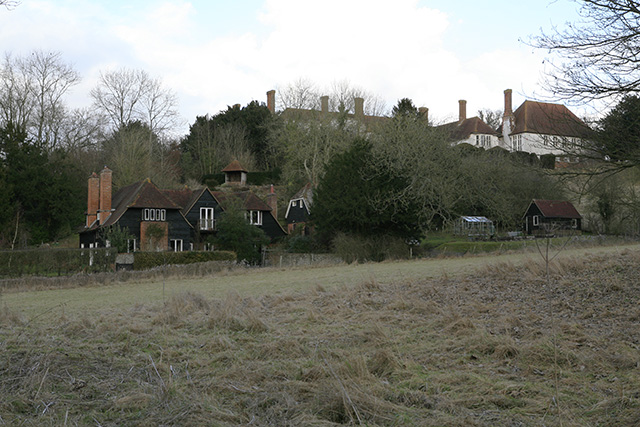

- Location within Hampshire
- OS grid reference: SU355337
- District: Test Valley
- Shire county: Hampshire
- Region: South East
- Country: England
- Sovereign state: United Kingdom
- Post town: STOCKBRIDGE
- Postcode district: SO20
- Dialling code: 01264
- Police: Hampshire and Isle of Wight
- Fire: Hampshire and Isle of Wight
- Ambulance: South Central
- UK Parliament: North West Hampshire

Marsh Court is a hamlet in the civil parish of Stockbridge in the Test Valley district of Hampshire, England. It is in the civil parish of Kings Somborne. Its nearest town is Stockbridge, which lies approximately 0.7 miles (1.4 km) north from the hamlet.

In the hamlet is Marshcourt, an Arts and Crafts style country house designed and built by architect Edwin Lutyens between 1901 and 1905, and for which Lutyens and Gertrude Jekyll created the garden.
