= Tranarossan House =

Building designed by Edwin Lutyens, in County Donegal, Ireland

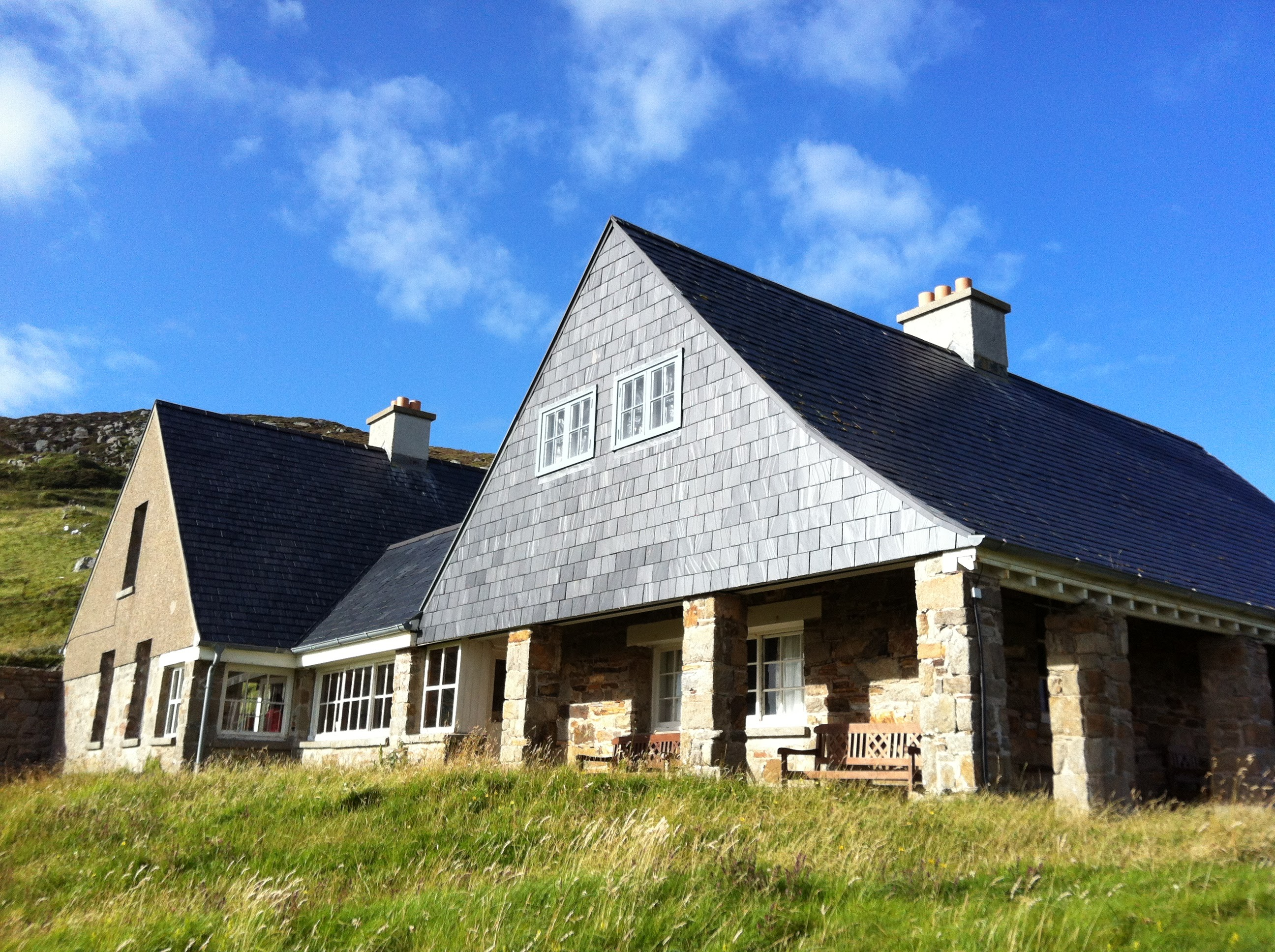
- "A witty holiday home"

- Location within Ireland
- 55.2292°N 7.8037°W
- Type: House
- Location: Carrigart, County Donegal, Ireland

History
- Built: c.1907

Site notes
- Architect: Edwin Lutyens
- Architectural style: Vernacular
- Governing body: An Óige (Irish Youth Hostel Association)

Tranarossan House is an early 20th-century building in Carrigart, County Donegal, Ireland. It was designed by Edwin Lutyens for Lucy Phillimore, wife of Robert Charles Phillimore. The Phillimores had bought the land on the Donegal coast in the 1890s and commissioned Lutyens to build a holiday home. The house is little documented and is not recorded in most studies of Lutyens. After her husband's death, Lucy Phillimore handed the house over to An Óige, the Irish Youth Hostel Association, in 1937. It still operates as An Óige's most northerly hostel and is a protected structure.

== History and architecture ==
Robert Charles Phillimore came from a family of successful and prosperous lawyers and politicians. He and his wife Lucy bought land at Carrigart in the 1890s and later commissioned Edwin Lutyens to design them a holiday home. By 1907, the year Tranarossan was completed, (Note: The exact date of the house’s construction is unclear. The Museum of Ireland ascribes it to 1907, while the Lutyens Trust describes it as “the last house Lutyens designed in Ireland”, which would date Tranarossan later than Costelloe Lodge in Connemara, the house he built for J. Bruce Ismay in around 1922. The record of the building in the Dictionary of Irish Architects does not provide a date. In their entry for the Winter House, Rawros, County Donegal, which it dates to c.1900, the National Inventory of Architectural Heritage (NIAH) notes design similarities between the two buildings and suggests that they were "built around the same time". Another NIAH document describes the house as "Edwardian" and built at the "start of the century".) Lutyens had established himself as one of England's leading architects of country houses. In his study of English domestic buildings, Das englische Haus, published in 1904, Hermann Muthesius had written of him, "He is a young man who has come increasingly to the forefront of domestic architects and who may soon become the accepted leader among English builders of houses".

Robert Phillimore died in 1919. After retaining the house for nearly 20 years, his widow donated it to An Óige in 1937. The house remains a youth hostel, the most northerly in Ireland. The house is little documented and is not referenced in most of the major studies of Lutyens and his work. (Note: Christopher Hussey’s official biography, The Life of Sir Edwin Lutyens, does not include mention of the house. It is recorded, as undated, in the catalogue for the 1982 exhibition at the Hayward Gallery which did much to restore Lutyens’ reputation.)

In his North West Ulster volume of the Buildings of Ireland series, Alistair Rowan describes Tranarossan as “two gabled granite blocks…the roofs huge unbroken slopes of heavy local slate”. The building is of one main storey, with attic bedrooms in the gables. Rowan, noting a “typical Lutyens joke” - a pier rising from the veranda stops just short of the roof beam it purports to support - calls the house a “witty holiday home”. Tranarossan is listed by Donegal County Council on its Record of Protected Structures.

== Sources ==
- Amery, Colin; Richardson, Margaret; Stamp, Gavin (1981). Lutyens: The Work of the English Architect Sir Edwin Lutyens. London: Arts Council of Great Britain. ISBN 9780728703032.
- Hussey, Christopher (1989) [1950]. The Life of Sir Edwin Lutyens. Woodbridge: Antique Collectors Club. ISBN 978-0-907462-59-0.
- Muthesius, H. (1979) [1904]. The English House (Single volume ed.). Frogmore: Granada Publishing. ISBN 978-0-258-97101-7.
- Rowan, Alistair (1979). North West Ulster. The Buildings of Ireland. Harmondsworth, Middlesex: Penguin Books. ISBN 978-0-140-71081-6. OCLC 813644345.
