= Southend-on-Sea War Memorial =

First World War memorial in Essex, England

- United Kingdom
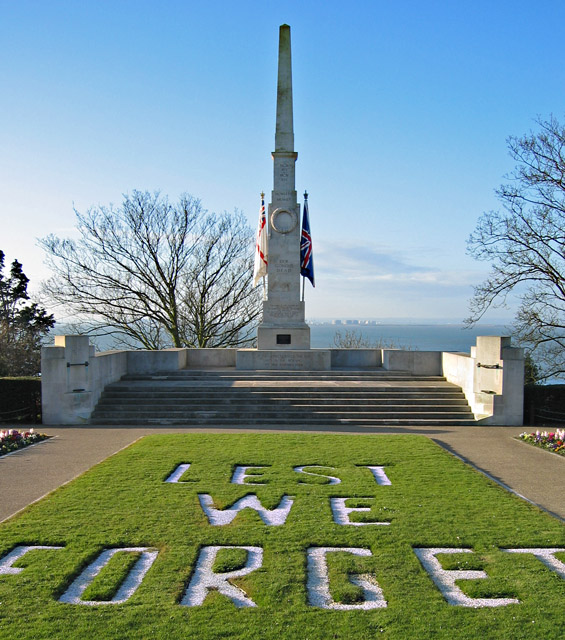
- For men from Southend killed in the First World War
- Unveiled: 27 November 1921
- Location: 51.53423°N 0.70495°E; Clifftown Parade, Southend-on-Sea, Essex
- Designed by: Sir Edwin Lutyens

Listed Building – Grade II*
- Official name: Southend-on-Sea War Memorial
- Designated: 23 August 1974
- Reference no.: 1322329

Southend-on-Sea War Memorial, or Southend War Memorial, is a First World War memorial in Southend-on-Sea, Essex, in south-eastern England. It was designed by Sir Edwin Lutyens and unveiled in 1921. Southend-on-Sea is a seaside resort famous for its pleasure pier, which was used by the military during the First World War. The town was a stopping point for soldiers en route to the front and, as the war drew on, it also became an important disembarkation point for the evacuation of injured troops. This saw the conversion of several buildings in Southend into hospitals.

A committee appointed Lutyens, the architect of The Cenotaph, to design a permanent memorial as a replacement for temporary shrines. He originally proposed a cenotaph but this was rejected in favour of an obelisk rising from a screen wall. In front of the monument is a garden, also designed by Lutyens, and the words "lest we forget" are set in stone on a lawn. Instead of carving them on the memorial, the names of the 1,338 dead from Southend are recorded on plaques fixed to the walls of Prittlewell Priory. The memorial is one of six obelisks Lutyens designed for war memorials in Britain and closely resembles those for Northampton and for the North Eastern Railway. It was largely praised by art historians but one Lutyens biographer felt the lettering in the grass detracted from it.

The memorial was unveiled on 27 November 1921 by the Lord Lieutenant of Essex and dedicated by the Bishop of Chelmsford in front of a large crowd. Invited guests included the mayor, local clergy, veterans from the district, and organisations which had contributed to the war effort in the area. The memorial became a listed building in 1974. Lutyens's memorials were declared a national collection in 2015 to commemorate the centenary of the war and Southend's was upgraded to grade II*. A statue of a soldier was added in 2019.

== Background ==
In the aftermath of the First World War, thousands of war memorials were built across Britain. Among the most prominent designers of memorials was the architect Sir Edwin Lutyens, described by Historic England as "the leading English architect of his generation". Lutyens established his reputation building country houses for wealthy clients around the turn of the twentieth century and later designed much of New Delhi, but the war had a profound effect on him. Thereafter, many of his commissions involved commemorating its casualties. He became renowned for The Cenotaph in London, which became Britain's national memorial, and for his work for the Imperial War Graves Commission.

Southend-on-Sea is a seaside resort on the Thames Estuary, 40 miles (60 kilometres) east of London. The town (which became a city in 2022) is famous for its pleasure pier. Immediately to the east is Shoeburyness, a garrison town and home to a military installation; to the north was an aerodrome (now Southend Airport), which became a naval air station. Shortly after the declaration of war, the British government began the internment of German citizens and several hundred were held on three ships moored off the pier. Many soldiers passed through Southend en route to the Western Front. The pier was frequently used to reach troop ships and Southchurch Park was taken over as an army training ground. As the war drew on, Southend also became an evacuation point for casualties and several hotels were converted to hospitals. The town was bombed by German Zeppelins twice in May 1915. Another bombing raid in 1917 caused more damage and 33 deaths.

== Commissioning ==
The formal end of the war, brought about by the signing of the Treaty of Versailles on 28 June 1919, saw celebrations in Southend and elsewhere. Four days of commemorative events began with a military parade in London on 19 July and on 23 July a fleet review was held in the Thames Estuary and the assembled warships fired a 21-gun salute. Multiple unofficial temporary shrines were made to commemorate Southend's casualties. At the end of the war, the town council agreed that these would be replaced with a permanent monument. A war memorial committee was founded, chaired by the mayor, to consider designs and sites. Among the proposals were a new wing for the local hospital, homes for disabled veterans, and gardens in Prittlewell Square. The committee ultimately decided on a site at the top of the cliffs, previously the location of a flagpole.

The committee commissioned Lutyens, who first suggested a variation of The Cenotaph. A sketch for the proposal is in the archives of the Royal Institute of British Architects. It is broadly similar to the Royal Berkshire Regiment's memorial in Reading in that it features an urn at the top. This was rejected in favour of an obelisk, which Lutyens designed for a fee of £5,500, and which the committee approved in 1921. Once the design was agreed, the project proceeded smoothly. To raise funds, concerts were laid on in the town and a fishing competition was held on the pier. Any surplus funds would be used to provide scholarships for children of the dead. Instead of engraving the names of the dead on the memorial, the committee decided to emboss the 1,338 names on tablets which would be fixed to the walls of Prittlewell Priory, a former religious building which became the town museum in the 1920s.

== Design ==
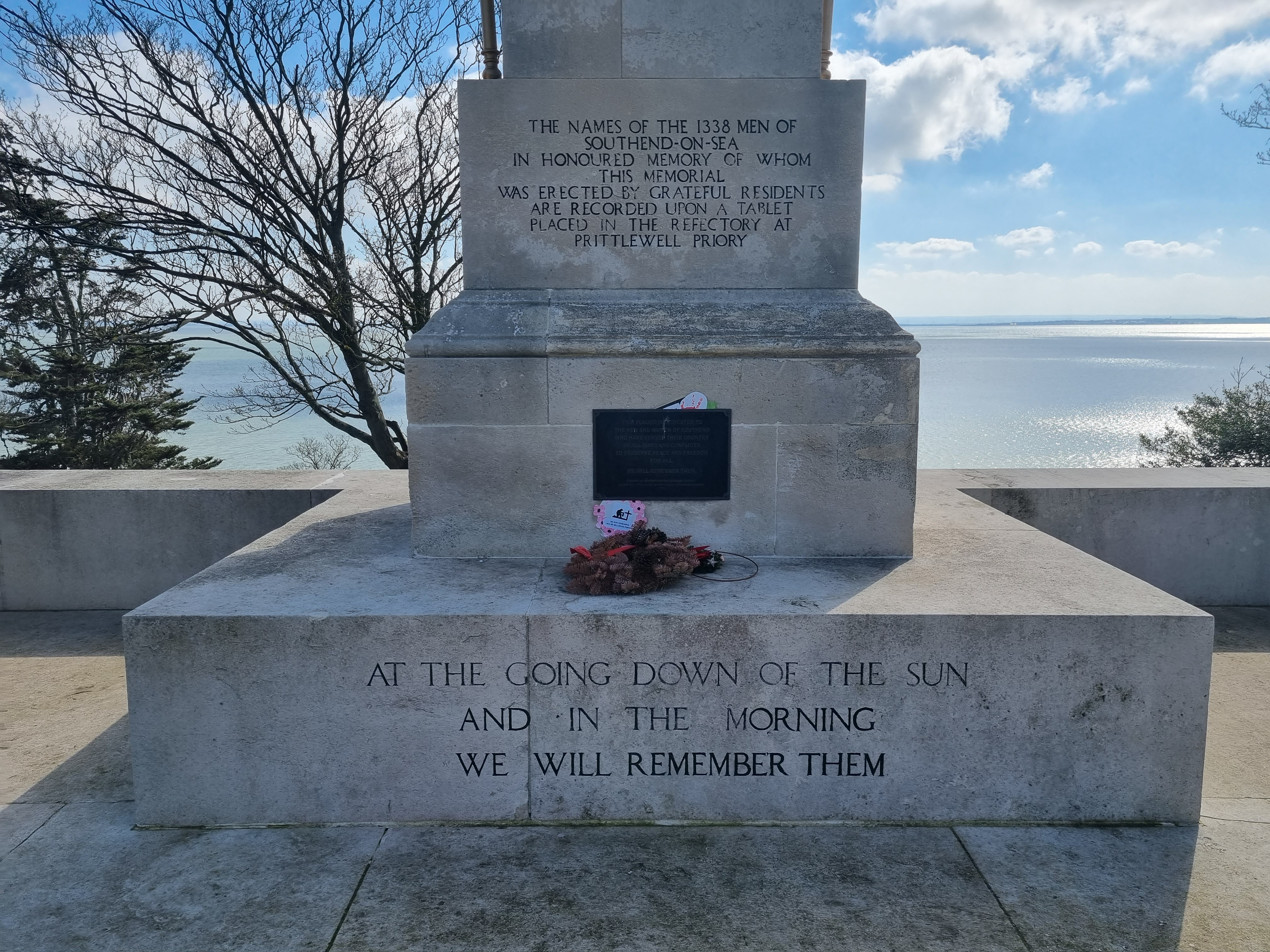
The lower stages of the obelisk bearing the dedicatory inscriptions, with the Thames Estuary in the background

Southend War Memorial consists of an obelisk surrounded on three sides by a screen wall, entirely in Portland stone. The obelisk tapers and rises to a height of approximately 36 feet (11 metres). It sits on a square base, below which is a moulded cornice. The cornice connects the base to a pedestal, which is in six stages of unequal size and shape. The lowest stage is incorporated into the screen wall, which narrows, forming an enclosure. Instead of the screen wall, at the front of the memorial (viewed from the north), is a flight of six shallow steps. The obelisk is approached via another two shallow steps. At the ends of the walls are bronze mounts for flags. The only sculptural features on the obelisk are two laurel wreaths on the north and south faces of the middle stage of the pedestal. The obelisk is flanked by a pair of painted stone flags which rise from the lower stages of the pedestal—the Union Flag on the west side and the White Ensign (the flag of the Royal Navy) on the east.

Above the laurel wreath on the north face are the dates of the two world wars in Roman numerals (the dates of the Second World War were added later). Below the laurel wreath is the dedication OUR GLORIOUS DEAD and at the bottom of the pedestal is the dedication:

THE NAMES OF THE 1338 MEN OF
SOUTHEND-ON-SEA
IN HONOURED MEMORY OF WHOM
THIS MEMORIAL
WAS ERECTED BY GRATEFUL RESIDENTS
ARE RECORDED UPON A TABLET
PLACED IN THE REFECTORY AT
PRITTLEWELL PRIORY

At the very bottom is a quote from Laurence Binyon's poem "For the Fallen": "At the going down of the sun, and in the morning, we will remember them". Later plaques are affixed—one to the base (above the lowest inscription), noting the recording of the names in the priory, and one from the Association of Jewish Ex-Servicemen and Women on the screen wall.

The memorial is sited in a prominent position at the top of a cliff, overlooking the Thames Estuary. A low hedge separates it from a cliff-top footpath. The monument stands in a garden off Clifftown Parade. The garden was also designed by Lutyens as part of the memorial scheme. It consists of a lawn surrounded by paths and flower beds and is enclosed by chains suspended from low bollards. The words "lest we forget" are formed from Portland stone chippings in the grass.

The painted stone flags flanking the obelisk

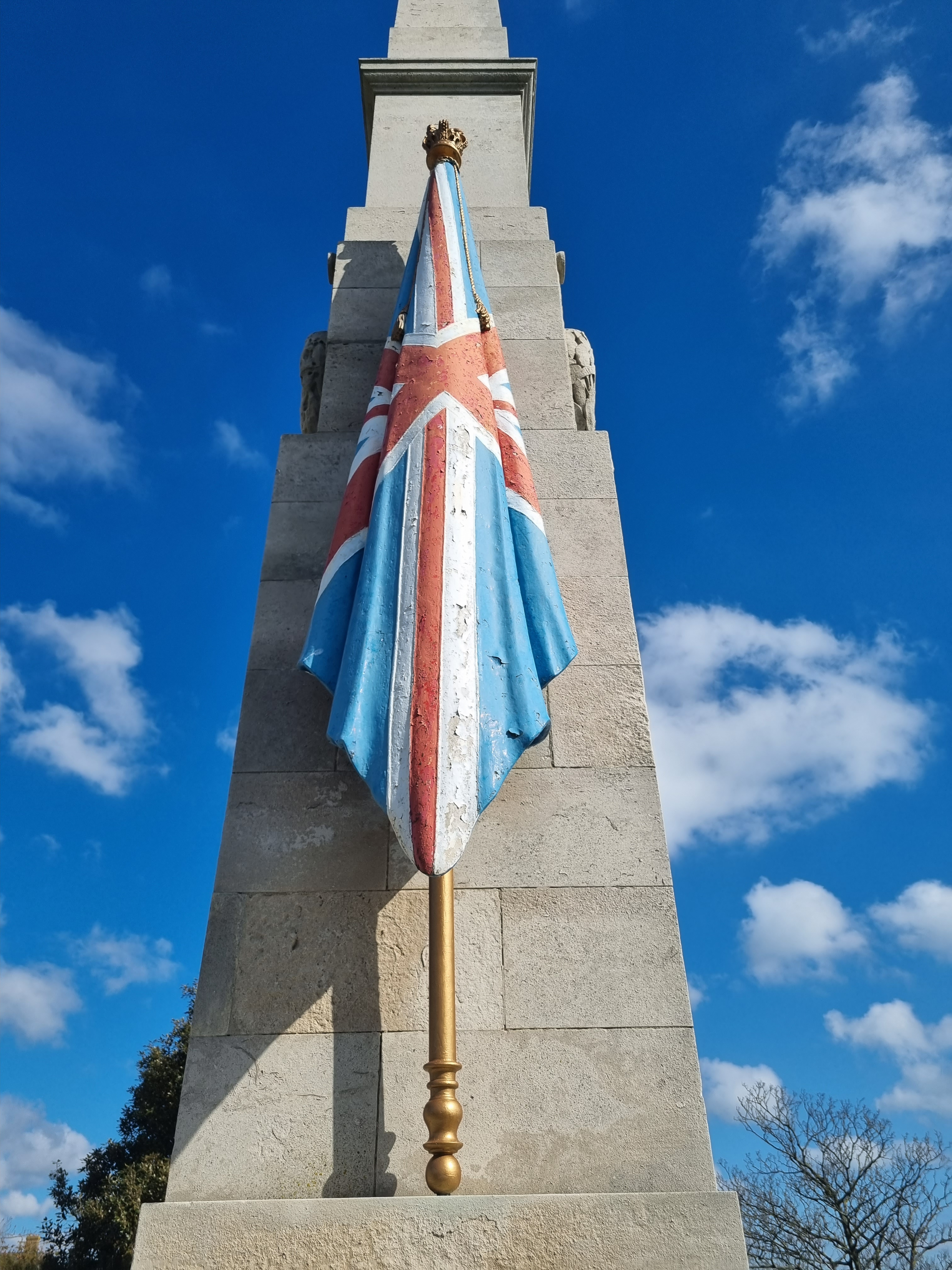
The Union Flag (east side)

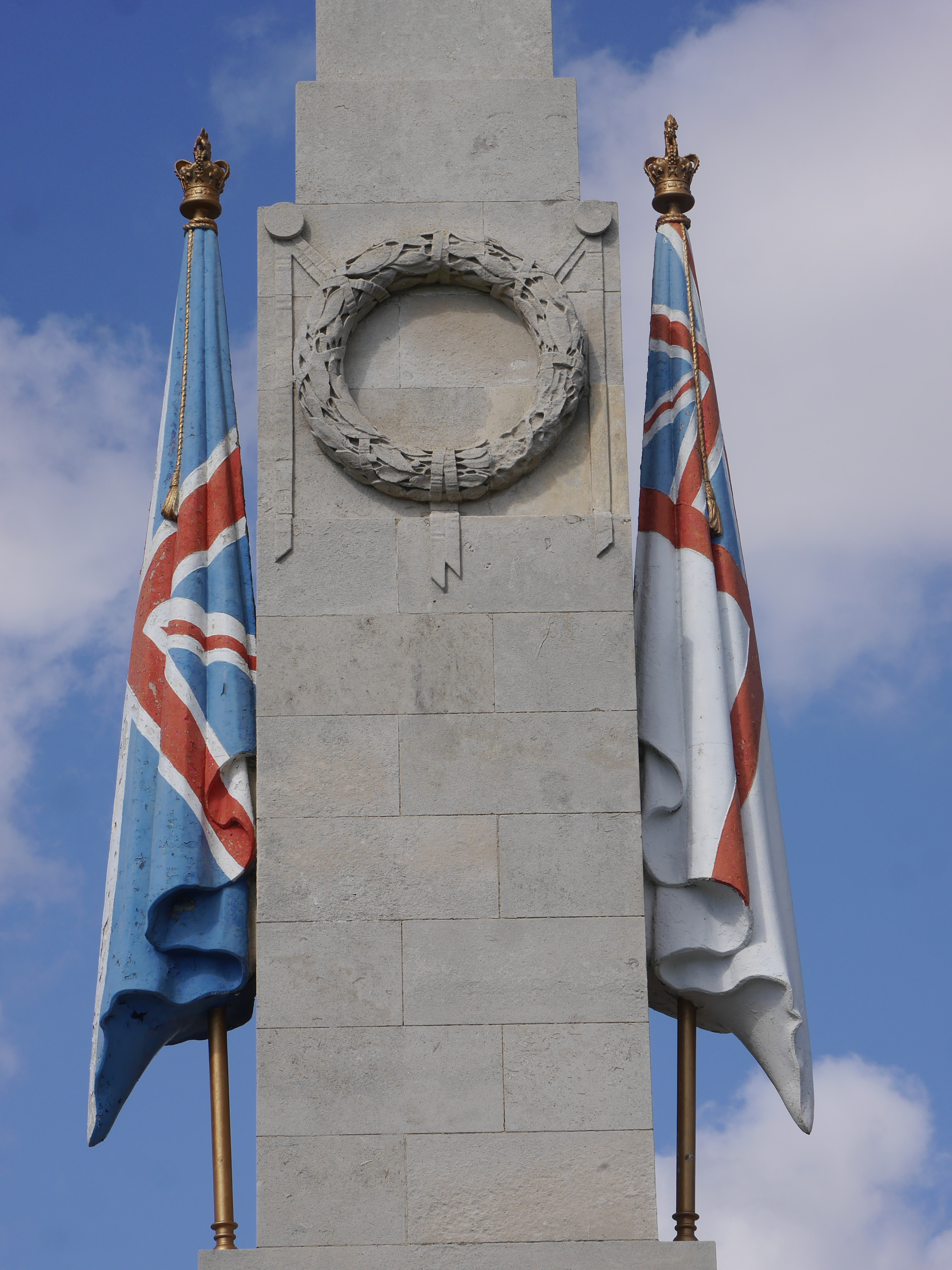
The flags seen from the north

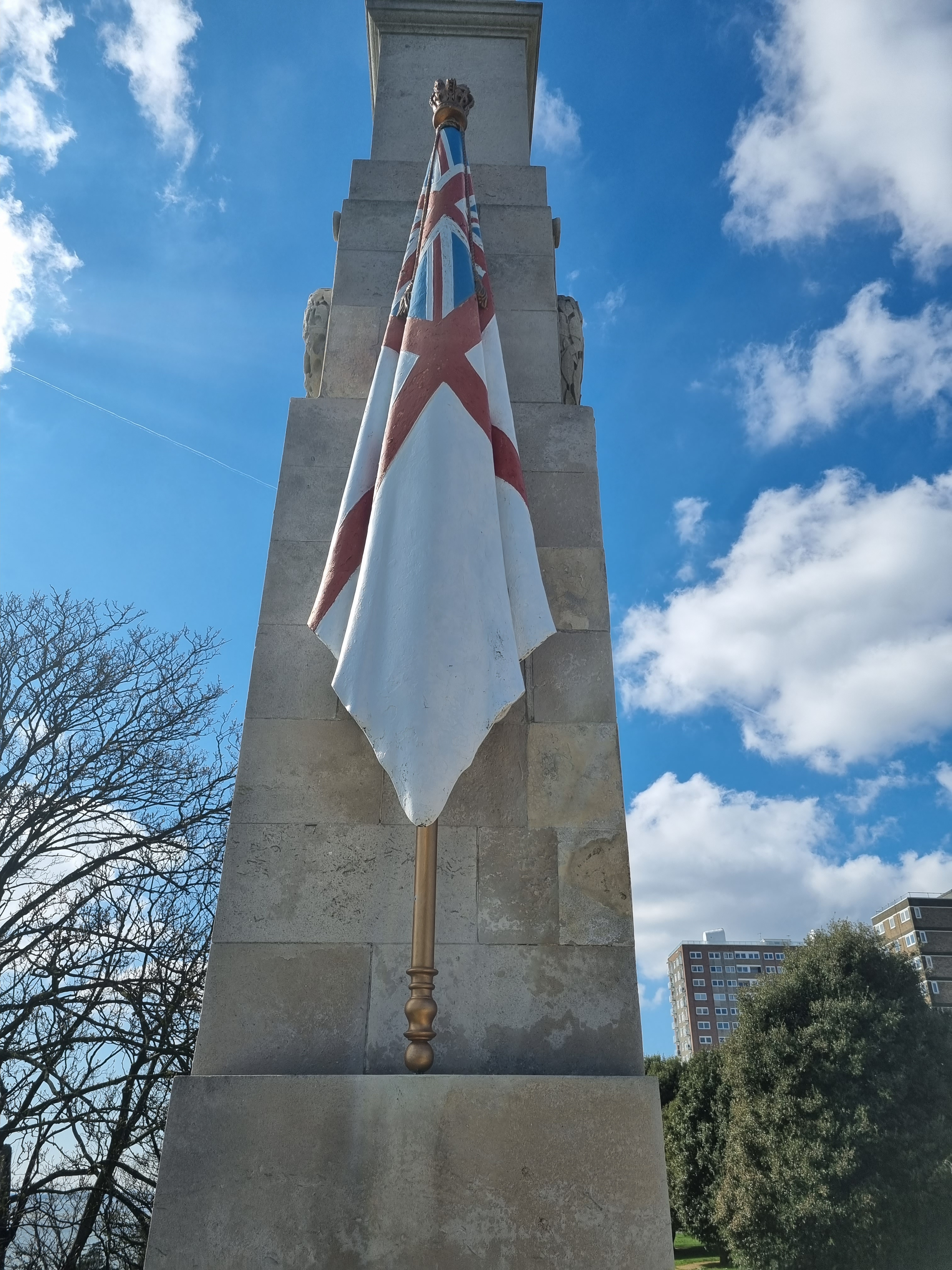
The White Ensign (west side)

== History ==
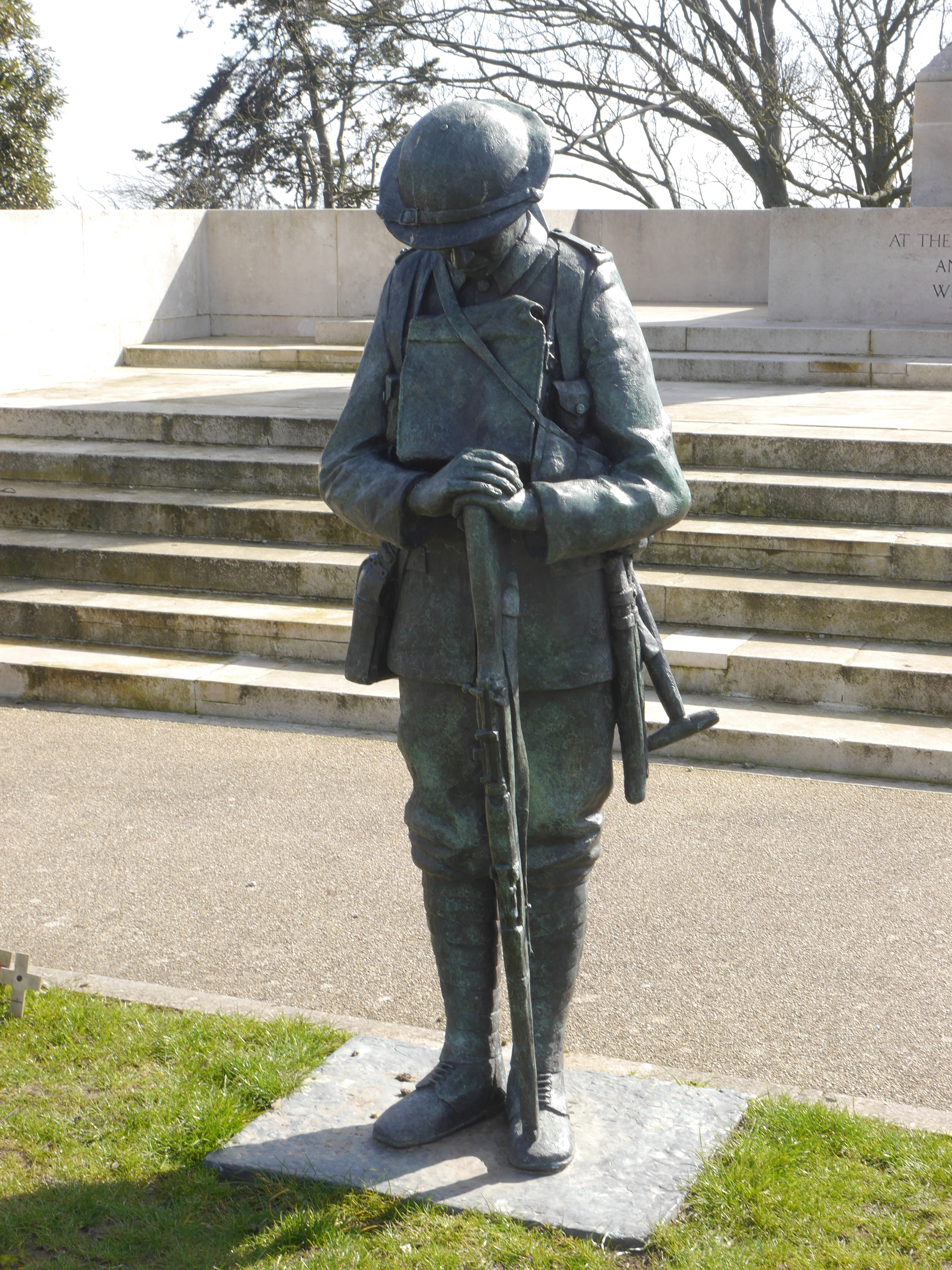
The statue of a First World War-era soldier, installed in 2019

Southend-on-Sea War Memorial was unveiled by Amelius Lockwood, 1st Baron Lambourne, the Lord Lieutenant of Essex, at a ceremony on 27 November 1921. It was dedicated by the Right Reverend Dr John Watts Ditchfield, Bishop of Chelmsford. The assembled crowd was one of the largest public gatherings ever recorded in the town. Soldiers from D Company of the 6th Battalion, Essex Regiment, provided a guard of honour and representatives of local organisations who were involved in the local war effort also attended. Also present were the mayor and all members of the borough corporation and several local clergy, who gave readings. Other invited guests included decorated veterans or (for the deceased) their next of kin, and representatives of the British Legion and the Naval and Military Club. The bishop praised the efforts of the dead and returned servicemen but lamented the widespread unemployment and unrest which followed the end of the war.

The memorial was designated a Grade II listed building on 23 August 1974. In November 2015, as part of commemorations for the centenary of the First World War, Lutyens's war memorials were recognised as a national collection and all of his free-standing memorials in England were listed or had their listing status reviewed and their National Heritage List for England list entries were updated and expanded. As part of this process, Southend's memorial was upgraded to Grade II*.

To commemorate the centenary of the end of the First World War, Southend-on-Sea Council commissioned a bronze statue of a soldier, which was installed in front of the memorial, at the south end of the lawn, in November 2019. The statue was created by a local sculptor, Dave Taylor, who intended it to resemble a soldier on the first day of the Battle of the Somme. Historic England consider that the "contrasting yet appropriate materials will complement the existing composition, adding a further layer of meaning".

== Appreciation ==
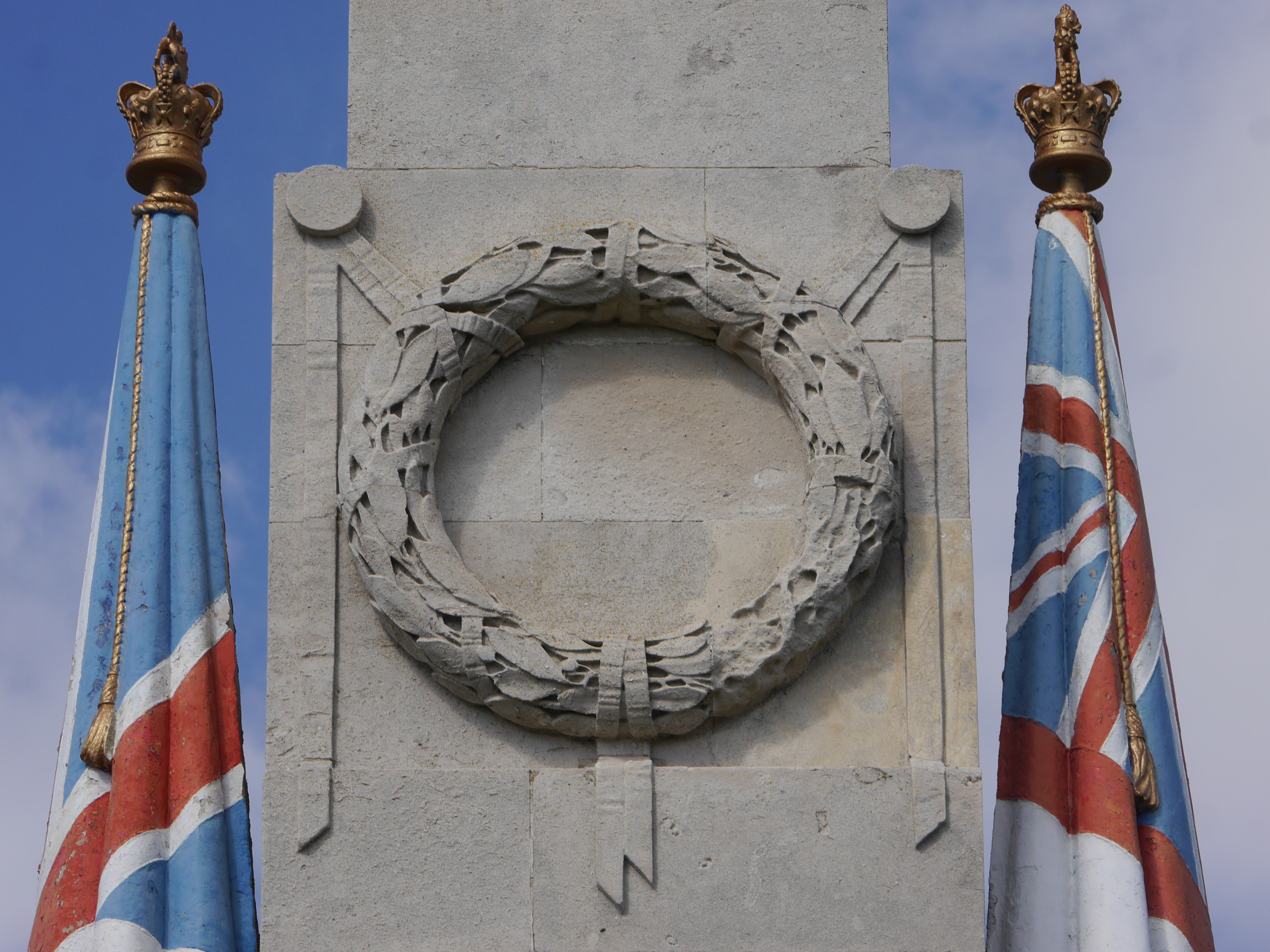
The laurel wreaths on the north and south faces of the memorial

Lutyens used obelisks in six of his war memorials in Britain, of which Southend's was the first to be completed. It closely resembles the obelisks on Northampton War Memorial which also support painted flags. The overall design is similar to Lutyens's North Eastern Railway War Memorial in York, which also includes a screen wall. Lutyens also used painted flags on an obelisk in Bury for the Lancashire Fusiliers War Memorial and at Étaples Military Cemetery, and he used similar obelisks to flank his Manchester Cenotaph. Obelisks were a fairly common form of memorial in larger towns after the First World War, particularly in coastal locations such as Southend, given the historical use of obelisks as navigational aids for shipping.

According to the art historian Alan Borg, the Southend obelisk has "subtle echoes" of The Cenotaph in it that other Lutyens obelisks do not. A local newspaper, the Essex Chronicle, called it a "fine memorial" and "a beautiful obelisk of Portland stone" in 1921, and the architectural historian Nikolaus Pevsner praised the "remarkably subtly proportioned" base and pedestal. Tim Skelton, in Lutyens and the Great War (2008), felt that the lettering in the grass detracted from the memorial's setting. Historic England, in upgrading the memorial's listing, described it as "an eloquent witness to the tragic impacts of world events on this community" and "a simple yet elegant obelisk incorporating carved decoration and two heavily detailed, painted stone flags" and noted its importance as one of 58 memorials designed by Lutyens in the UK and abroad.

== See also ==
- Grade II* listed buildings in Southend-on-Sea
- Grade II* listed war memorials in England
- List of works by Edwin Lutyens
