= Stockbridge War Memorial =

World War I memorial in Stockbridge, Hampshire, England

- United Kingdom
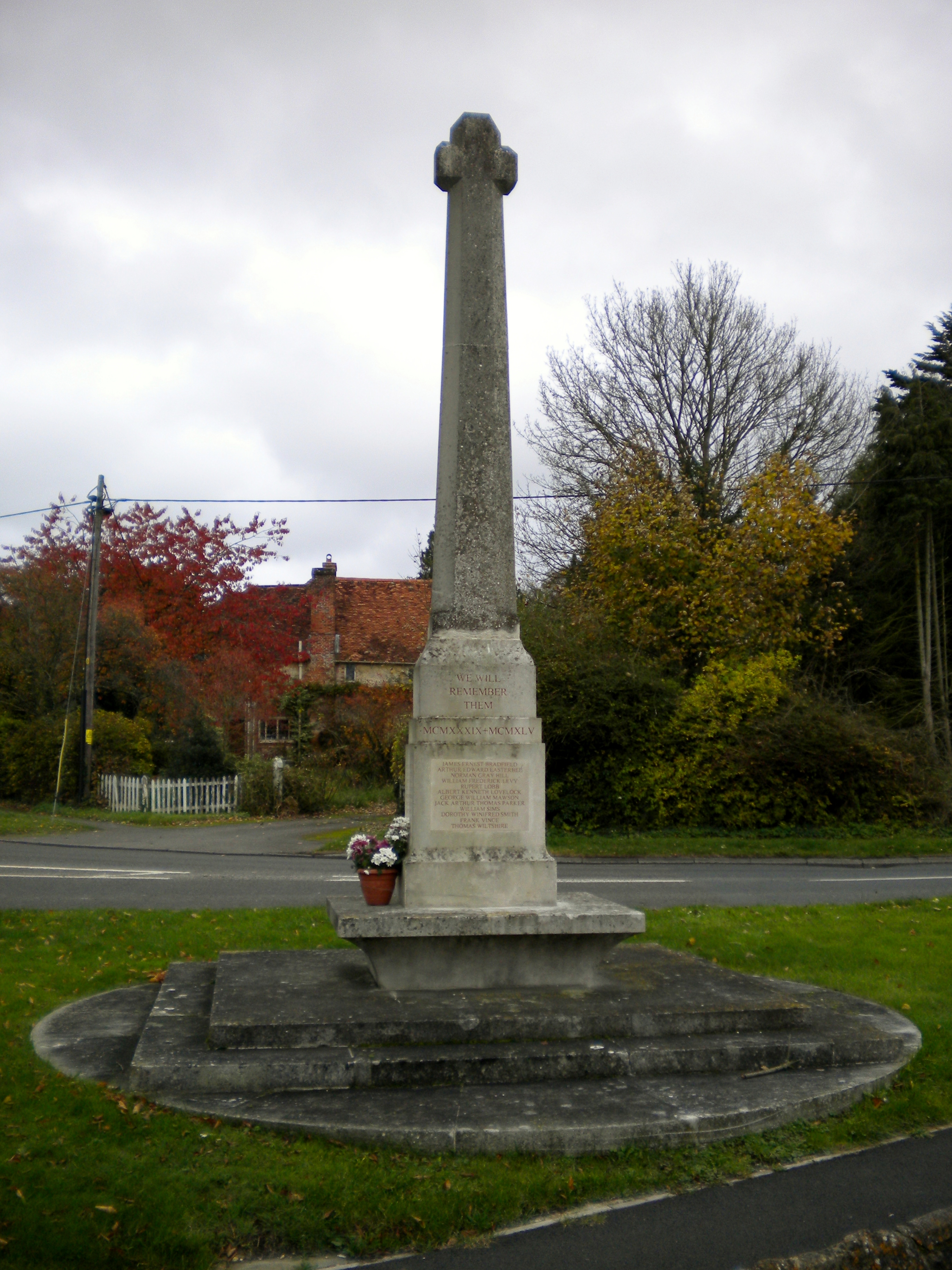
- For men from Stockbridge killed in the First World War
- Unveiled: 3 April 1921
- Location: 51.11341°N 1.48763°W; Stockbridge, Hampshire
- Designed by: Sir Edwin Lutyens

Listed Building – Grade II
- Official name: Stockbridge War Memorial
- Designated: 7 February 1986
- Reference no.: 1093099

Stockbridge War Memorial is a First World War memorial in the town of Stockbridge in Hampshire in southern England. The memorial was designed by Sir Edwin Lutyens and unveiled in 1921; it is a grade II listed building.

== Background ==
In the aftermath of the First World War and its unprecedented casualties, thousands of war memorials were built across Britain. Amongst the most prominent designers of memorials was the architect Sir Edwin Lutyens, described by Historic England as "the leading English architect of his generation". Lutyens designed the Cenotaph on Whitehall in London, which became the focus for the national Remembrance Sunday commemorations, as well as the Thiepval Memorial to the Missing—the largest British war memorial anywhere in the world—and the Stone of Remembrance which appears in all large Commonwealth War Graves Commission cemeteries and in several of Lutyens's civic war memorials. The King's Somborne memorial is one of fifteen War Crosses by Lutyens, all sharing a broadly similar design; another, King's Somborne War Memorial, is situated in the nearby village of King's Somborne.

Prior to the outbreak of war, Lutyens established his reputation designing luxurious country houses for wealthy clients. Like many of his war memorials, the commission for Stockbridge originated with a pre-war client. Lutyens designed Marshcourt, a country house on the edge of the town, for Herbert Johnson at the turn of the twentieth century; during the First World War, Johnson and his wife Violet ran a 60-bed military hospital out of Marshcourt and after the Armistice, Johnson was adamant that Stockbridge and the neighbouring village of King's Somborne should both have a memorial to the war dead. Herbert Johnson chaired the war memorial committees in both Stockbridge and King's Somborne; he also donated the site for the Stockbridge memorial and made a significant financial contribution towards its construction.

== History and design ==
The memorial stands in the east of Stockbridge, on the A3057 road near the junction with the A30. In Portland stone, it is one of Lutyens' fifteen War Crosses. It has a tapering shaft, to which the short arms are moulded close to the top, which sits on a splayed plinth. Below the plinth is a coved base, which forms a seat at the foot of the cross, similar to the memorial at King's Somborne. The whole memorial stands on four stone steps—square for the top two steps and circular for the bottom two. The names of the fallen from the First World War are inscribed on two sides of the plinth; the east side contains the dedication "OUR DEAD / THROUGH WHOM / WE LIVE / MCMXIV – MCMXIX". The west face was originally inscribed "THANKS BE TO GOD / WHO GIVETH US / THE VICTORY", but this was replaced in 2008 with a dedication for the Second World War: "WE WILL REMEMBER THEM / MCMXXXIX – MCMXXXXV". Black paint was added to the inscriptions in 2005 to improve legibility.

The memorial was unveiled on 3 April 1921 by Violet Johnson. After Violet Johnson's death in 1923—partly brought about by her wartime work running the hospital at Marshcourt—Lutyens designed a memorial cross to her, which was placed in Winton Hill Cemetery in Stockbridge, and which is today a grade II listed building.

Stockbridge War Memorial was designated a grade II listed building on 7 February 1986. In November 2015, as part of the commemorations of the centenary of the First World War, Lutyens's war memorials were recognised as a "national collection" and all of his free-standing memorials in England were listed or had their listing status reviewed and their National Heritage List for England list entries were updated and expanded.
