= King's Somborne War Memorial =

War memorial in Hampshire, England

- United Kingdom
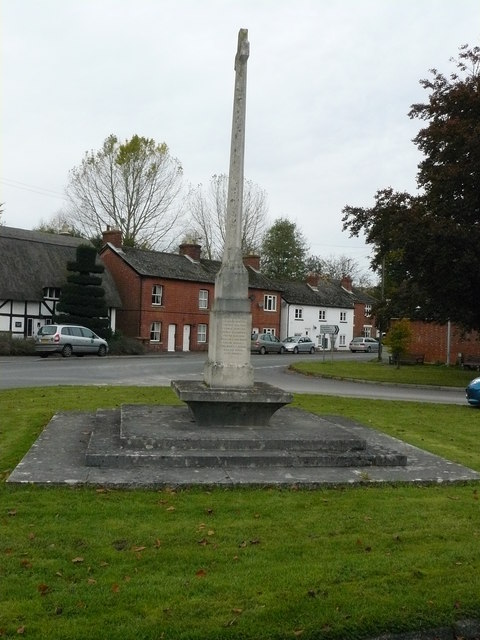
- For men from King's Somborne killed in the First World War
- Unveiled: 27 March 1921
- Location: 51.077201°N 1.487495°W; Romsey Road, King's Somborne, Hampshire near Stockbridge
- Designed by: Sir Edwin Lutyens

Listed Building – Grade II
- Official name: Kings Somborne War Memorial
- Designated: 7 February 1986
- Reference no.: 1093814

King's Somborne War Memorial is a First World War memorial in the village of King's Somborne in Hampshire in southern England. The memorial was designed by Sir Edwin Lutyens and unveiled in 1921; it is a grade II listed building.

== Background ==
In the aftermath of the First World War and its unprecedented casualties, thousands of war memorials were built across Britain. Amongst the most prominent designers of memorials was the architect Sir Edwin Lutyens, described by Historic England as "the leading English architect of his generation". Lutyens designed the Cenotaph on Whitehall in London, which became the focus for the national Remembrance Sunday commemorations, as well as the Thiepval Memorial to the Missing—the largest British war memorial anywhere in the world—and the Stone of Remembrance which appears in all large Commonwealth War Graves Commission cemeteries and in several of Lutyens's civic war memorials. The King's Somborne memorial is one of fifteen War Crosses by Lutyens, all sharing a broadly similar design; another, Stockbridge War Memorial, is situated in the nearby town of Stockbridge.

Prior to the outbreak of war, Lutyens established his reputation designing luxurious country houses for wealthy clients. Like many of his war memorials, the commission for King's Somborne originated with a pre-war client. Lutyens designed Marshcourt, a country house near Stockbridge, for Herbert Johnson at the turn of the twentieth century; during the First World War, Johnson and his wife Violet ran a 60-bed military hospital out of Marshcourt and after the Armistice, Johnson was adamant that King's Somborne and Stockbridge should both have a memorial to the war dead.

== Inception ==
It was Johnson, with the assistance of the local vicar, who chaired the first public meeting in King's Somborne to discuss the village's commemorations, held in the village schoolhouse in February 1919. Several letters containing ideas for the form of the memorial were read out, and several more were proposed during the meeting, including a wayside cross and a parish hall.

The meeting agreed to hold a consultation to establish how much the residents of the village would be willing to contribute, and to form a large committee to decide on the form; Johnson pledged a donation of £100. When the committee reported back, its decision was to commission a Lutyens War Cross, along with a bronze tablet in the nearby Church of St Peter and St Paul to bear the names of the dead.

== History and design ==
The cross stands at the junction of Romsey Road (the A3057 road) and Church Road in the centre of King's Somborne. It is in Portland stone, consisting of a tapering, lozenge-shaped shaft with short arms moulded close to the top. It sits on a three-tiered plinth of stone blocks which itself sits on a narrow coved plinth which splays upwards from the bottom to provide a seat at the foot of the cross. The plinth rests on base of three shallow stone steps. On the front of the plinth is the inscription: "TO THE GLORIOUS MEMORY OF THE MEN OF KINGS SOMBORNE / MCM XIV + MCM XIX / MCM XXXIX + MCM XLV" and on the back: "THANKS BE TO GOD WHO GIVETH US THE VICTORY". The names of the fallen from both world wars are inscribed below the dedication around the plinth; the inscriptions related to the Second World War were added at a later date.

The memorial was unveiled by Rear Admiral Sir Godfrey Paine on 27 March (Easter Sunday) 1921. The Portland stone memorial, being a limestone, gradually weathered to the point that the legibility of the names was affected. In the late 20th century, the names were re-cut and filled with black paint to preserve their legibility.

After Violet Johnson's death in 1923, Lutyens designed a memorial cross to her, which was placed in Winton Hill Cemetery in Stockbridge, and which is today a grade II listed building.

King's Somborne War Memorial was designated a grade II listed building on 7 February 1986. In November 2015, as part of the commemorations of the centenary of the First World War, Lutyens's war memorials were recognised as a "national collection" and all of his free-standing memorials in England were listed or had their listing status reviewed and their National Heritage List for England list entries were updated and expanded.
