= Marshcourt =

Country house in Marsh Court, near Stockbridge, Hampshire, England

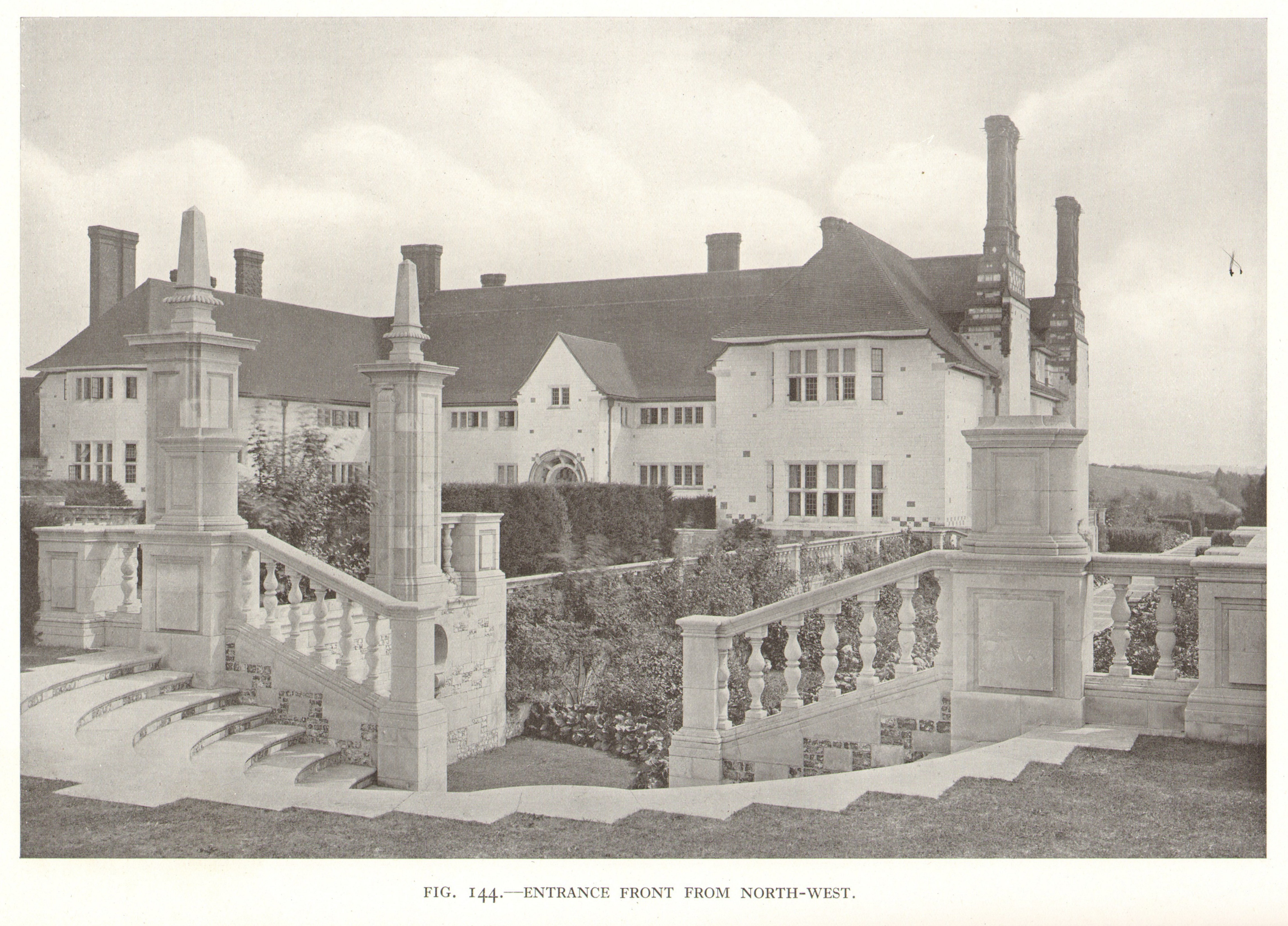
- The north, entrance front (Weaver, 1913)

- Location within Hampshire
- 51°06′02″N 1°29′32″W
- Type: Country House
- Location: Kings Somborne
- OS grid reference: SU 35660 33594

History
- Built: 1901-1905

Site notes
- Area: Hampshire
- Architect: Edwin Lutyens
- Architectural style: Tudor Revival
- Owner: Private

Listed Building – Grade I
- Official name: Marshcourt School
- Designated: 29 May 1957
- Reference no.: 1093803

Listed Building – Grade II*
- Official name: Sunken garden on south of west wing of Marsh Court
- Designated: 7 February 1986
- Reference no.: 1093807

Listed Building – Grade II
- Official name: Moat in front of forecourt of Marsh Court to the north
- Designated: 7 February 1986
- Reference no.: 1093804

National Register of Historic Parks and Gardens
- Official name: Marsh Court
- Type: Grade II*
- Designated: 31 May 1984
- Reference no.: 1000149

Marshcourt, also spelled Marsh Court, is an Arts and Crafts style country house in Marsh Court, near Stockbridge, Hampshire, England. It is constructed from quarried chalk. Designed and built by architect Edwin Lutyens between 1901 and 1905, it is a Grade I listed building. The gardens, designed by Lutyens and Gertrude Jekyll, are Grade II* listed in the National Register of Historic Parks and Gardens.

== House ==
=== Construction ===
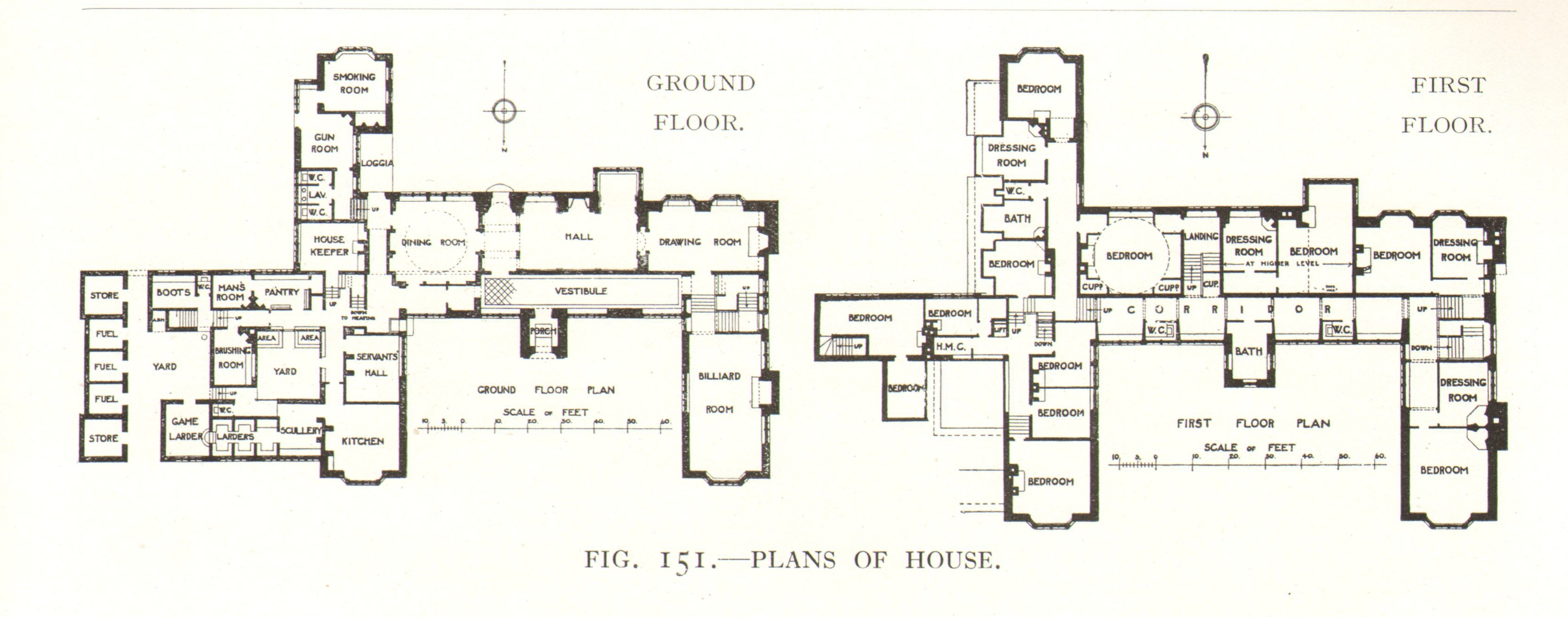
Plans of house, north at bottom (Weaver, 1913)

Lutyens built Marshcourt for Herbert "Johnnie" Johnson, a trader/stockjobber on the London Stock Exchange, where he had accumulated a fortune of half a million pounds. He bought a hillside site overlooking the River Test (on a ridge above a much older manor house in the valley bottom, Marsh Court Manor), and approached Lutyens after seeing his work portrayed in Country Life. They became lifelong friends.

The house was built on the hillside, out of locally quarried chalk cut as ashlar, known as clunch. Lutyens interspersed pieces of black flint and red tiles in the masonry. The exterior design of the house is Tudor, with mullioned and transomed windows, and twisted brick chimneys. "Elizabethan bricks" were supplied by the Daneshill Brick and Tile Company, an enterprise set up by another Lutyens client, Walter Hoare.

The north, entrance front on the higher ground is two-storey, in an E-plan with the facades displaying predominantly horizontal lines. The south, garden front is taller, less symmetrical, and with emphatic vertical lines. The west end of the south front is dominated by chimney stacks. At the east end of the south front, a wing projects forward, enclosing a service courtyard.

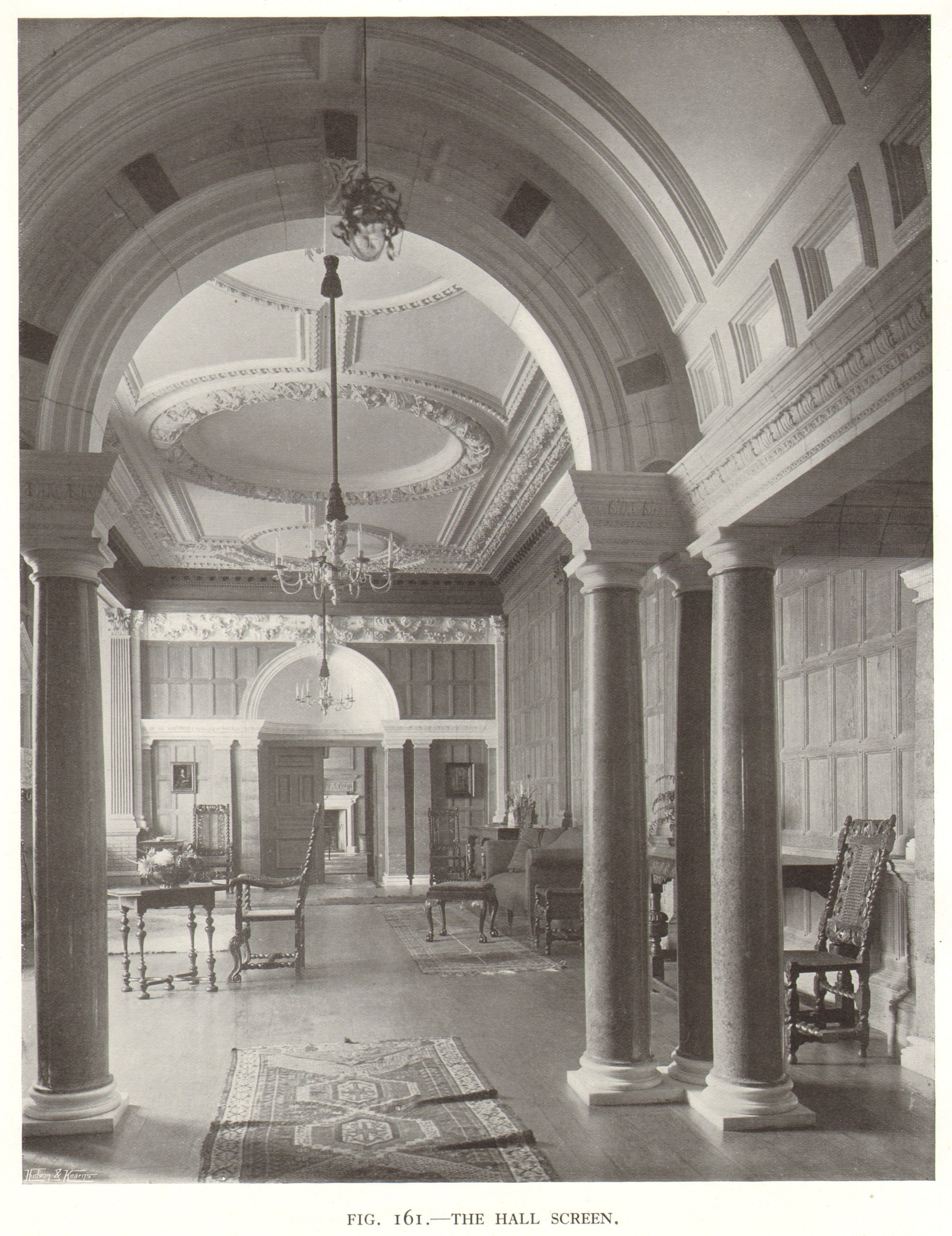
The neoclassical hall (Weaver, 1913)

Internally, a long corridor runs east to west, with the main rooms all south-facing. The interior design is neoclassical. The oak-panelled hall features two friezes carved in chalk, with classical festoons. The dining room is panelled in walnut veneer. Ceilings have highly decorative plasterwork. There are chalk fireplaces and even a chalk billiard table. Lutyens also designed the light fittings.

=== Wartime use ===
In the First World War, Marshcourt became a 60-bed military hospital, run by Johnson's wife, a local widow who had been known as Violet Meeking before their marriage in 1912, and had been born Violet Fletcher. She also ran a military hospital in Stockbridge. In 1919, Herbert Johnson instigated the construction of the Grade II listed Stockbridge War Memorial, designed by Lutyens and unveiled in 1921 by Violet Johnson, and King's Somborne War Memorial, also designed by Lutyens, unveiled in 1921 and Grade II listed. Violet Charlotte Johnson was awarded an MBE, for her services in the care of wounded soldiers, but died in 1921. Lutyens designed her Grade II listed memorial in Winton Hill cemetery, Stockbridge.

=== Later years ===
In 1924–6, Lutyens added a ballroom to the southeast corner of the house, in the same architectural style. Johnson later installed a full-size organ there.

In 1932, after falling on hard times Johnson sold Marshcourt for £60,000, having paid £150,000 originally. It later became a preparatory school, known as Marsh Court School.

In 1993 Marshcourt was bought by the Belgian car importer Joska Bourgeois for £630,000. Bourgeois allowed the British businessman and politician Geoffrey Robinson to appear as the owner of the house, he would eventually inherit it after Bourgeois' death, some eight months later. Robinson sold Marshcourt in 1999 to its present owners.

== Gardens ==
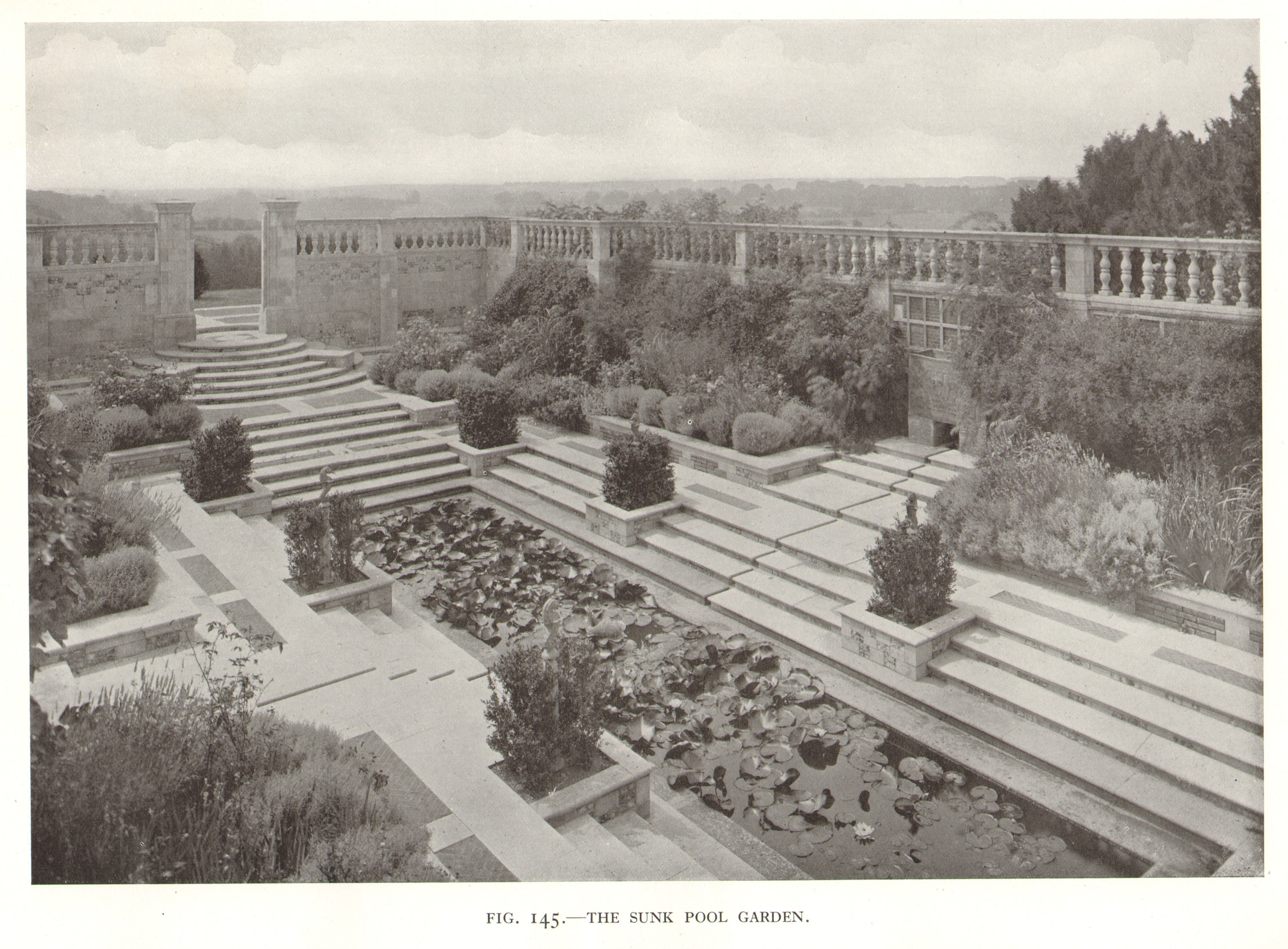
The sunken pool garden (Weaver, 1913)

Gardens with terraces, pools and pergolas surround the house, connected by paths paved in stone inset with herringbone pattern brickwork panels. Main gardens include the Piazza, a lawned area immediately to the south of the house, with a central sundial, and a sunken pool garden adjacent to the Piazza to its west. There are extensive views from a west-facing loggia over the Piazza and the sunken garden towards the Test valley, an arrangement similar to an earlier Lutyens work, Orchards in Surrey, and other Lutyens houses.

The sunken garden has a rectangular pool containing a dolphin fountain and surrounded by concentric stone steps and flowerbeds. It is Grade II* listed. Sculptures of seahorses and tortoises around the pool were created by Julia Chance, the owner of Orchards.

A dry moat running around the forecourt to the north of the house is crossed by a bridge. These were both designed by Lutyens, and are Grade II listed.

== In media ==
An episode of the 2011 BBC series The Country House Revealed was dedicated to Marshcourt. Marsh Court was used as the Churston residence of Sir Carmichael Clarke in Agatha Christie's Poirot in the episode The A.B.C. Murders
