= Orchards, Surrey =

Arts and Crafts style house in Bramley, Surrey, England

Orchards
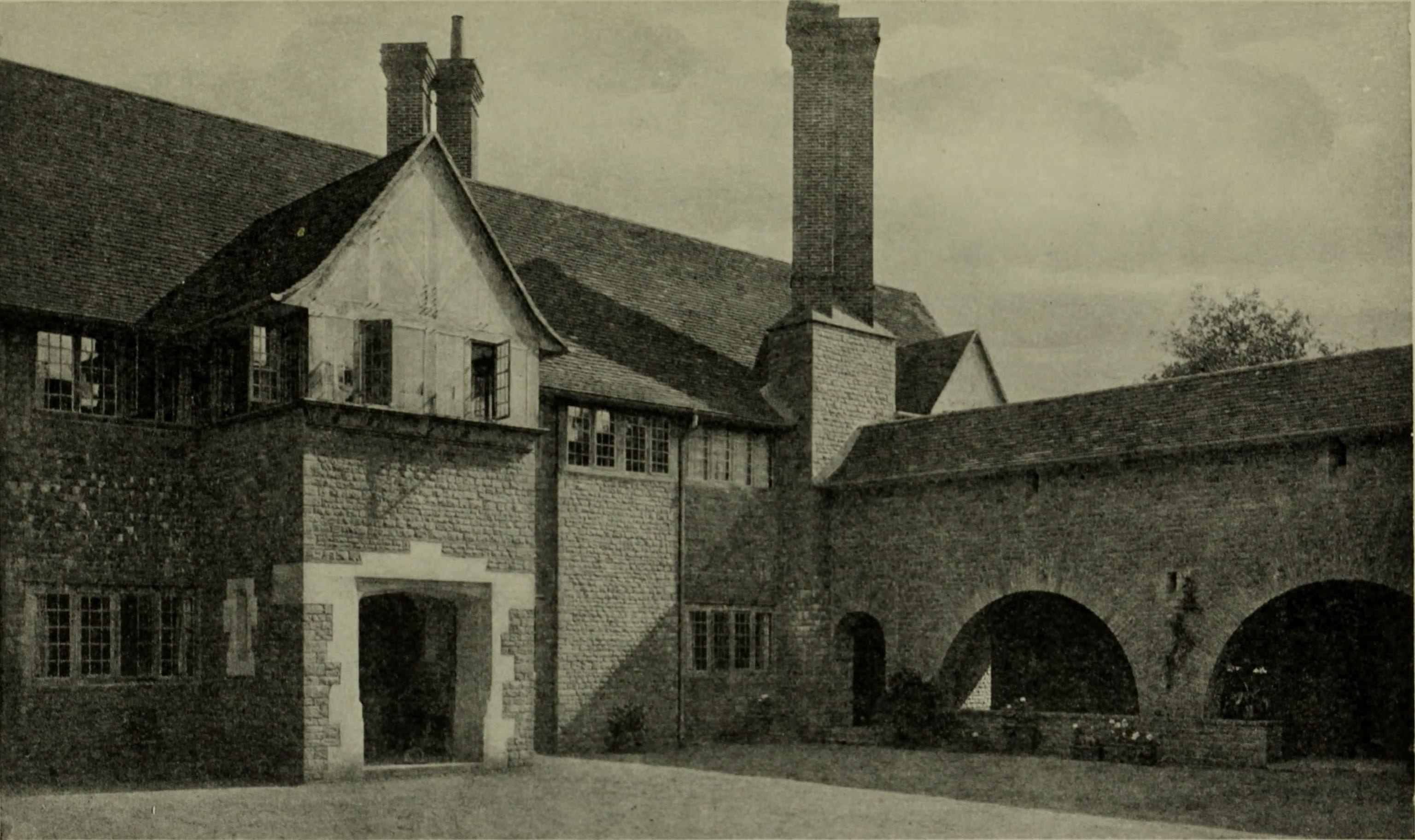
- The southwest corner of the courtyard in 1921 showing the entrance porch (left) and cloister

- Location in Surrey
- 51°10′49″N 0°34′53″W
- Location: Bramley, Surrey
- OS grid reference: SU 99258 43282

History
- Built: 1897–99

Site notes
- Area: 6 ha (15 acres)
- Architect: Edwin Lutyens
- Architectural style: Arts and Crafts style

Listed Building – Grade I
- Official name: Orchards
- Designated: 9 March 1960
- Reference no.: 1378318

National Register of Historic Parks and Gardens
- Official name: Orchards
- Designated: 1 June 1984
- Reference no.: 1001174

Orchards is an Arts and Crafts style house in Bramley in Surrey, England. It is on Bramley's boundary with Busbridge and 1 mile (1.6 km) south-east of Godalming town centre. Described by English Heritage as the first major work of architect Edwin Lutyens, it is a Grade I listed building. The gardens are Grade II* listed in the National Register of Historic Parks and Gardens. The property is privately owned.

== History ==
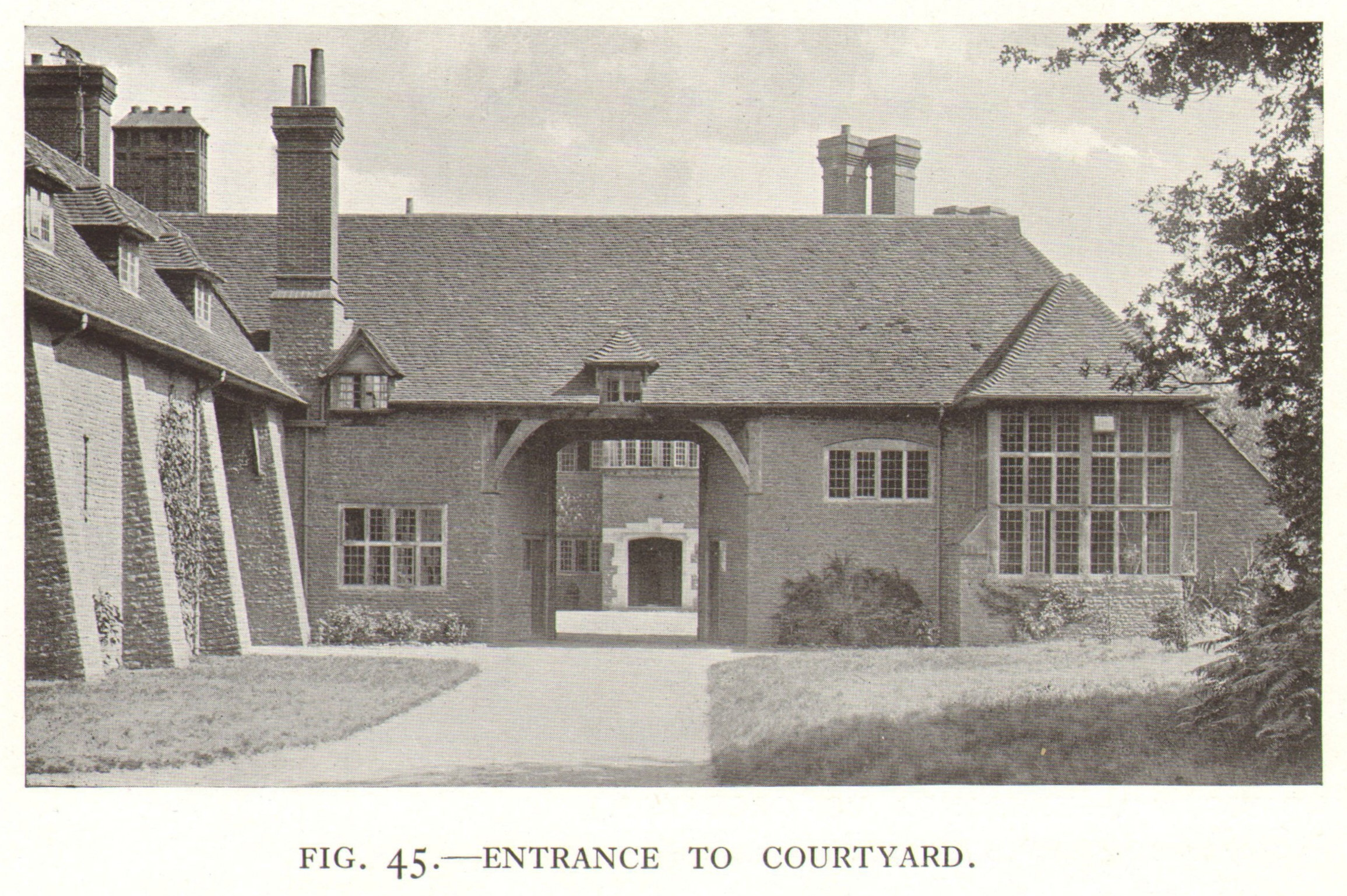
Looking along the driveway through to the main porch on the far side of the courtyard

The house was built during 1897–99 by Edwin Lutyens for William and Julia Chance. Sir William Chance (2 July 1853 – 9 April 1935), a barrister and philanthropist, was the son of Sir James Timmins Chance, of the glassmaking company Chance Brothers, and succeeded his father as the second Chance baronet in 1902. His wife, born Julia Charlotte Strachey, was the only child of explorer Sir Henry Strachey. She was an amateur sculptor, and a supporter of the Arts and Crafts movement.

The couple initially commissioned architect Halsey Ricardo for their new house, but did not like his preliminary designs. When they happened to walk past Munstead Wood, the house which Lutyens was then building for garden designer Gertrude Jekyll, they were impressed and decided to employ Lutyens instead. They also employed the same local firm of builders as Jekyll used at Munstead Wood, Thomas and William Underwood. (Note: In 1917, William and Julia Chance employed Lutyens again, to restore Legh Manor, a 16th-century house in Ansty and Staplefield, West Sussex, and the following year they commissioned Jekyll to design the garden.)

Orchards was the first in a series of successful designs by Lutyens for Arts and Crafts style country houses, larger than Munstead Wood but similarly using local styles of vernacular architecture. These included Goddards and Tigbourne Court in Surrey, Deanery Garden in Berkshire and Little Thakeham in Sussex. This series of designs established Lutyens' reputation. It was the final house designed by Lutyens before his marriage.

Lutyens carried out minor alterations in 1909 and 1914. In 1939, the panelling was removed from the dining room to allow it to be combined with the drawing room. A restoration project was undertaken in the 1980s by Frances and Michael Edwards.

== House ==
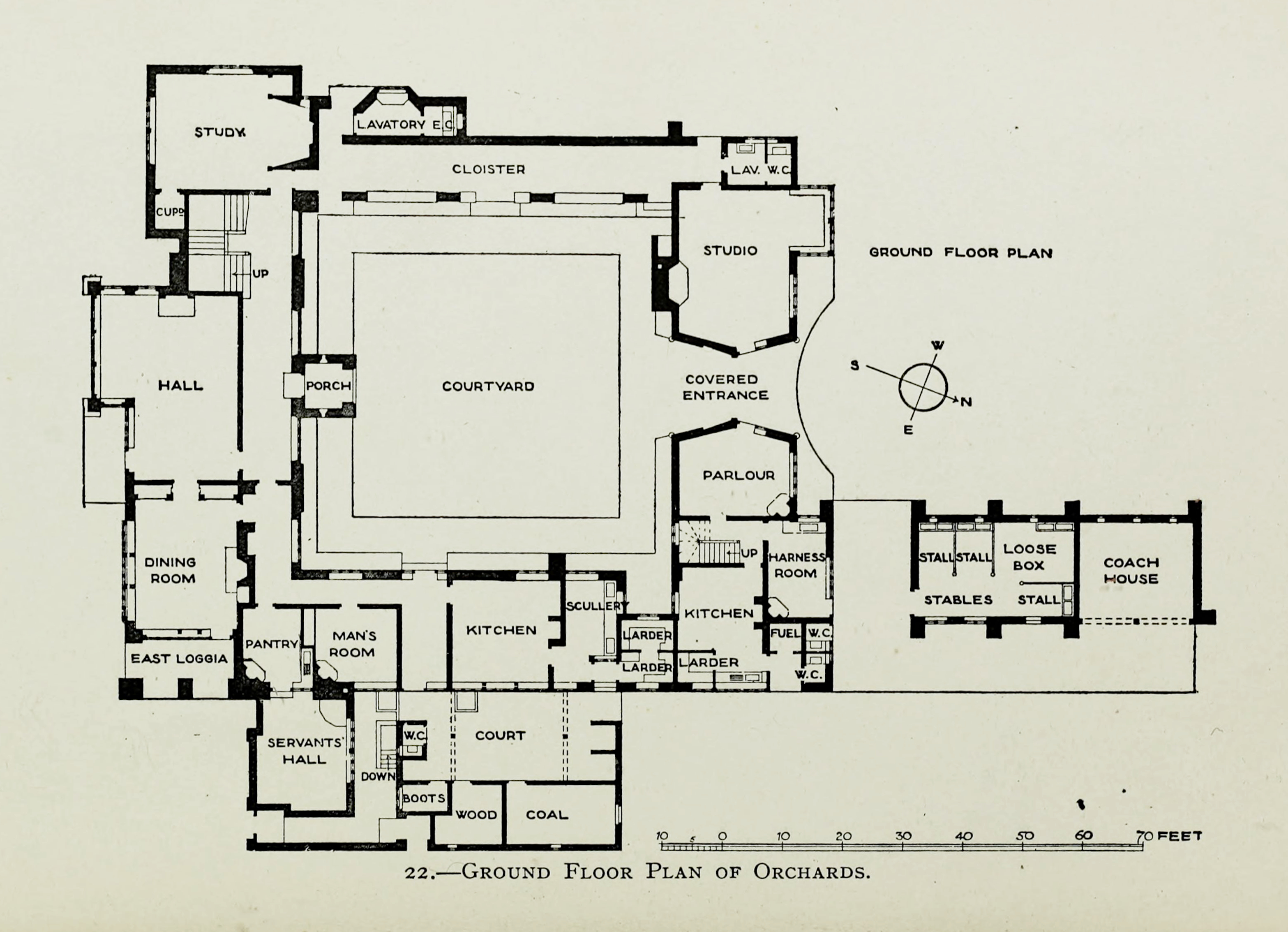
Ground floor plan, 1921 (north is to the right)

The main part of Orchards is arranged around a square courtyard, which, according to Lutyens' biographer, Christopher Hussey, suggests the layout of a converted farmyard. The primary building material is local Bargate stone, although the walls also contain bands of red tiles. The roof consists of red tiles and the main vertical elements, the chimneys, are of red brick. Around half of the floor area of the house is dedicated to working areas, including the kitchen and servants' quarters.

From the road, the driveway runs alongside the windowless, buttressed wall of the stableblock, which according to O'Brien, Nairn and Cherry "leads the eye on to the entrance side of the courtyard." The two-storey rectangular opening in the northern side of the house, gives access to the courtyard with the main entrance on the opposite side. The west side of the quadrangle is a low cloister, that acts as a covered walkway linking the north and south ranges.

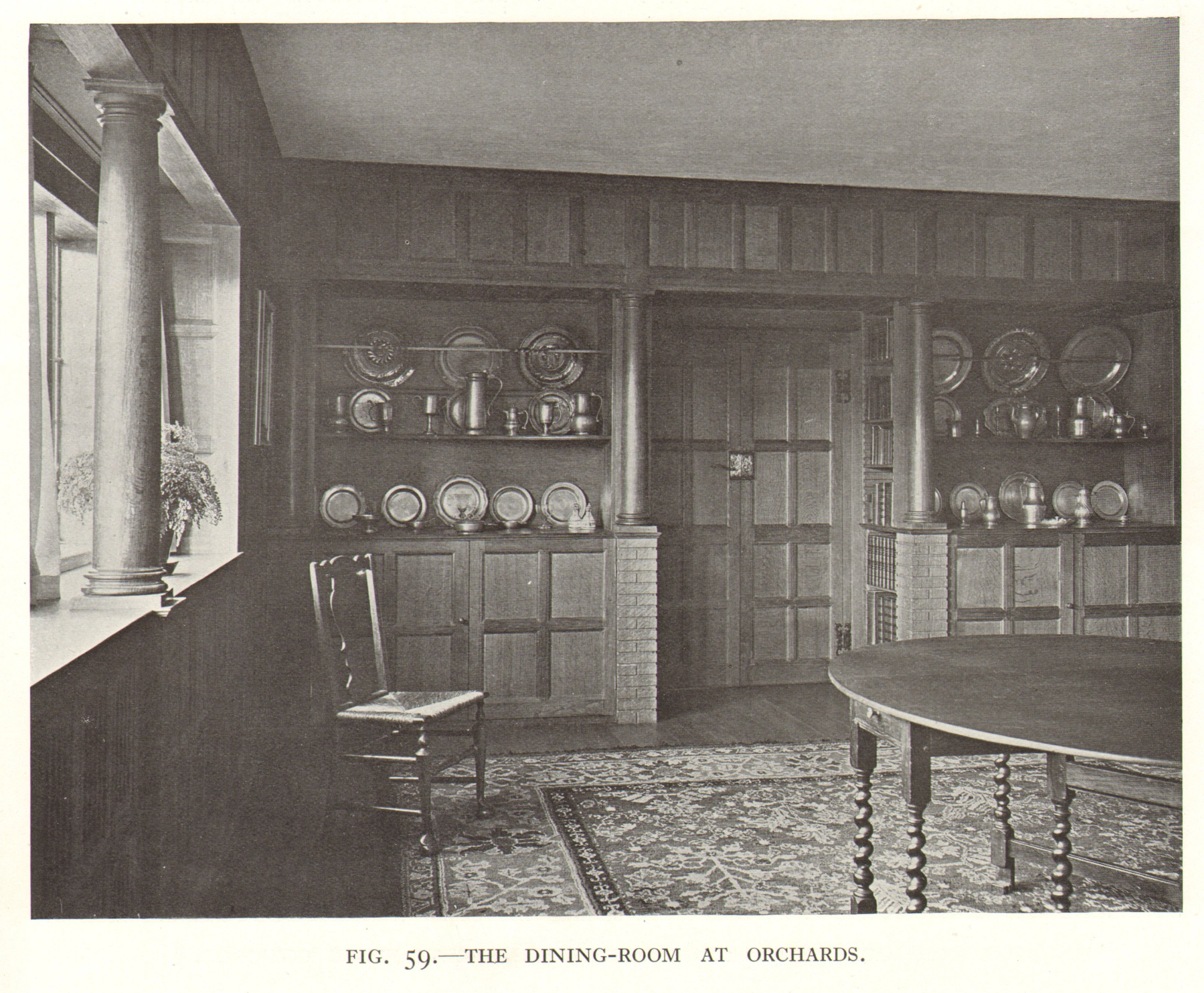
Dining room

The three main reception rooms – dining room, hall/drawing room and study – are on the south side of the courtyard and are directly linked to the porch by the main corridor. The dining room, in the southeastern corner, has an east-facing loggia, looking out on the sunken Dutch garden and the Thorncombe Valley beyond. (Note: Lutyens later used this combination of a loggia overlooking a sunken garden at other houses, such as at Marshcourt in Hampshire.) The fireplace in the hall/drawing room was designed by Julia Chance and the fireplace in the study is surfaced with Dutch ceramic tiles depicting plans of the house and garden. The main staircase is built of oak to resemble examples from the 17th century.

In the north-west corner of the courtyard, Lutyens provided Julia Chance with a two-storey, north-facing studio. The room features a 6 m high (20 ft) fireplace built with niches inlaid with roofing tiles.

== Garden ==
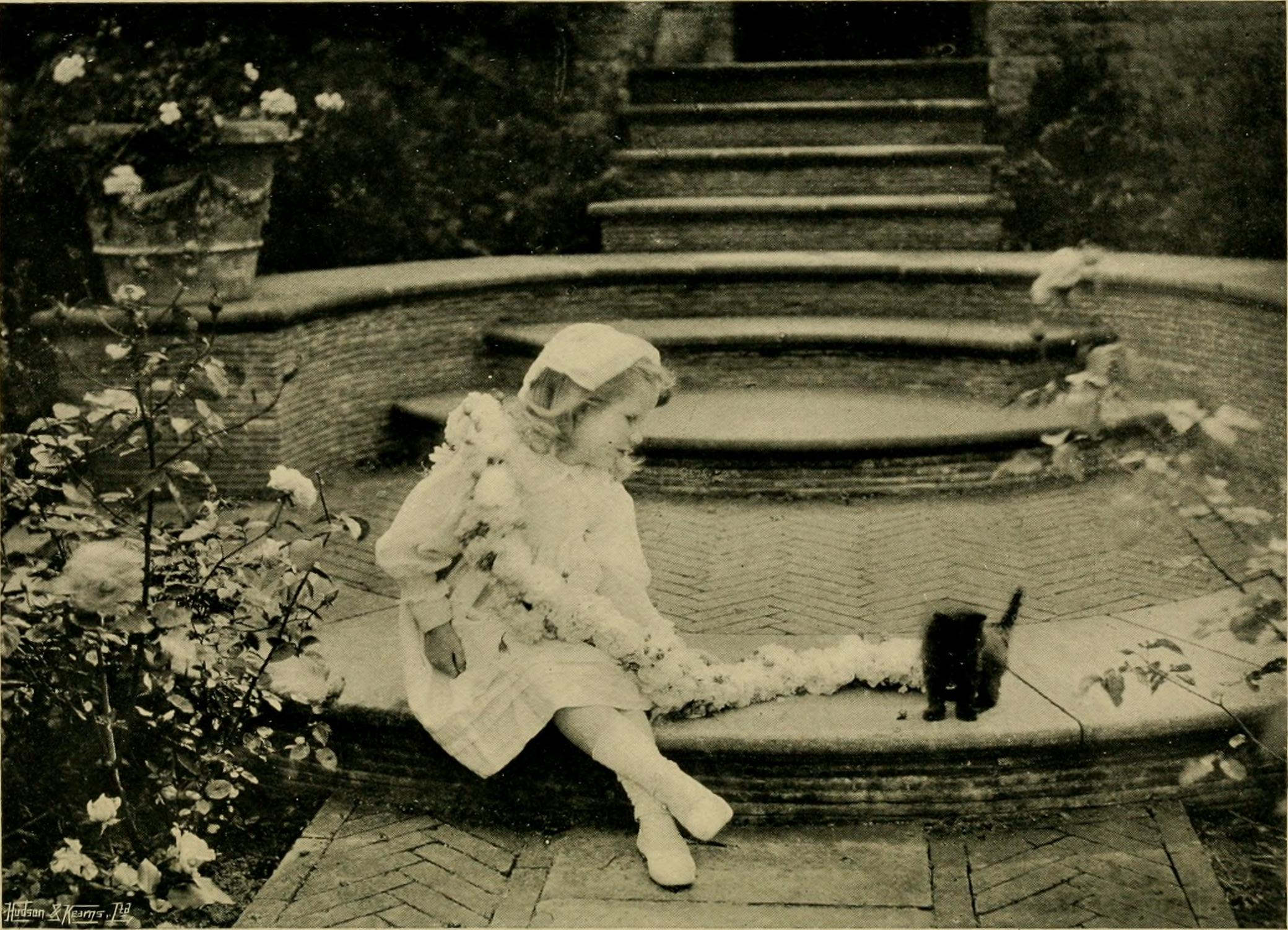
Julia Chance's niece, Dorothea Strachey, in the Dutch garden, photographed by Gertrude Jekyll and originally published in Children and Gardens (1908)

Orchards is built on a hilltop overlooking the town of Godalming to the west and the Thorncombe valley and the Weald to the southeast. The land, around 26 acres (11 ha), is mostly covered by oak, beech and fir woodland that on the western side comes almost up to the house. The academic, David Dunster, notes that the formal parts of the garden are delineated on the northeast side from the woodland by a "rampart walk" that "emphasises the drama of discovering the distant views of the Hog's Back."

The planting scheme was created by Gertrude Jekyll. Julia Tankard notes that the design "is successful because of the way in which the gardens respond to the natural setting." Jekyll writes: "The scheme of planting has been kept very simple, with crabapples, amelanchiers, gorse, and wild rambling roses where the woodland meets the lawn, and closer to the terrace rhododendrons, barberry, and spiraea." The writer, Tim Richardson, considers that the planting complements Lutyens' architecture, "rather than softening it".

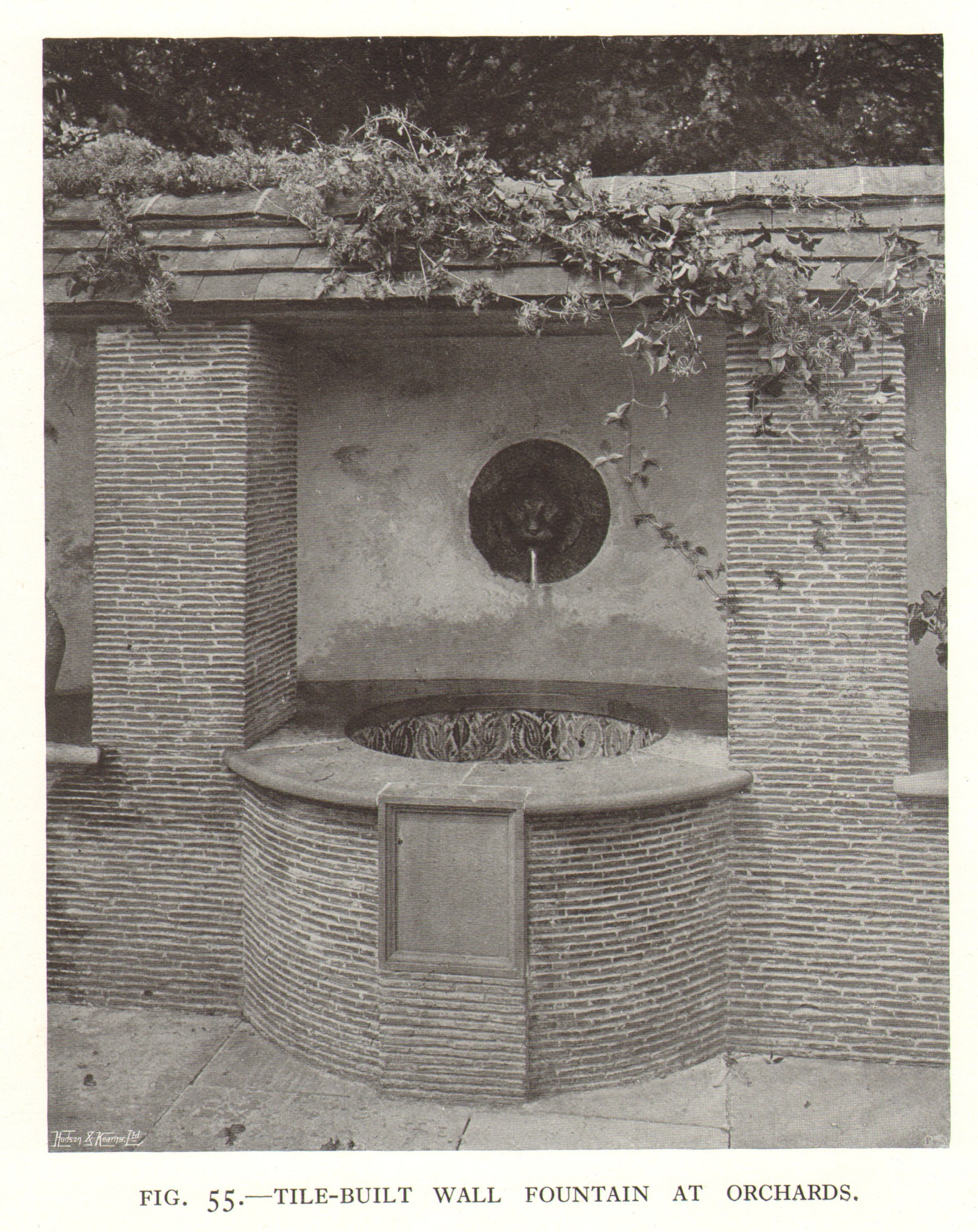
The wall fountain in the Dutch garden

Semi-circular steps lead down from the loggia outside the dining room into the Dutch garden. This formal area was a creation of Lutyens and was not inspired by any horticultural tradition from the Netherlands. Intended to appear as an outdoor projection of the house, it is enclosed by a yew hedge that gives the space the feel of a "garden room". The semi-circular steps, designed by Lutyens, reinforce the geometric design and the area is planted with lavender. The focal point of the Dutch garden is the Grade II-listed fountain, which includes a water spout designed by Julia Chance in the shape of a lion mask. Chance remained a close friend of Jekyll and subsequently created sculptures for other Lutyens/Jekyll gardens, including at Marshcourt.

The walled kitchen garden, on the eastern side of the house, includes wrought iron gates designed by Lutyens. The main focal points are the octagonal dipping well, surrounded by rambler roses, and the oak entrance doorway. In his 1913 publication, Houses and gardens by E.L. Lutyens, Lawrence Weaver notes that the kitchen garden contains espalier fruit trees trained on an oak trellis.

== Critical responses ==
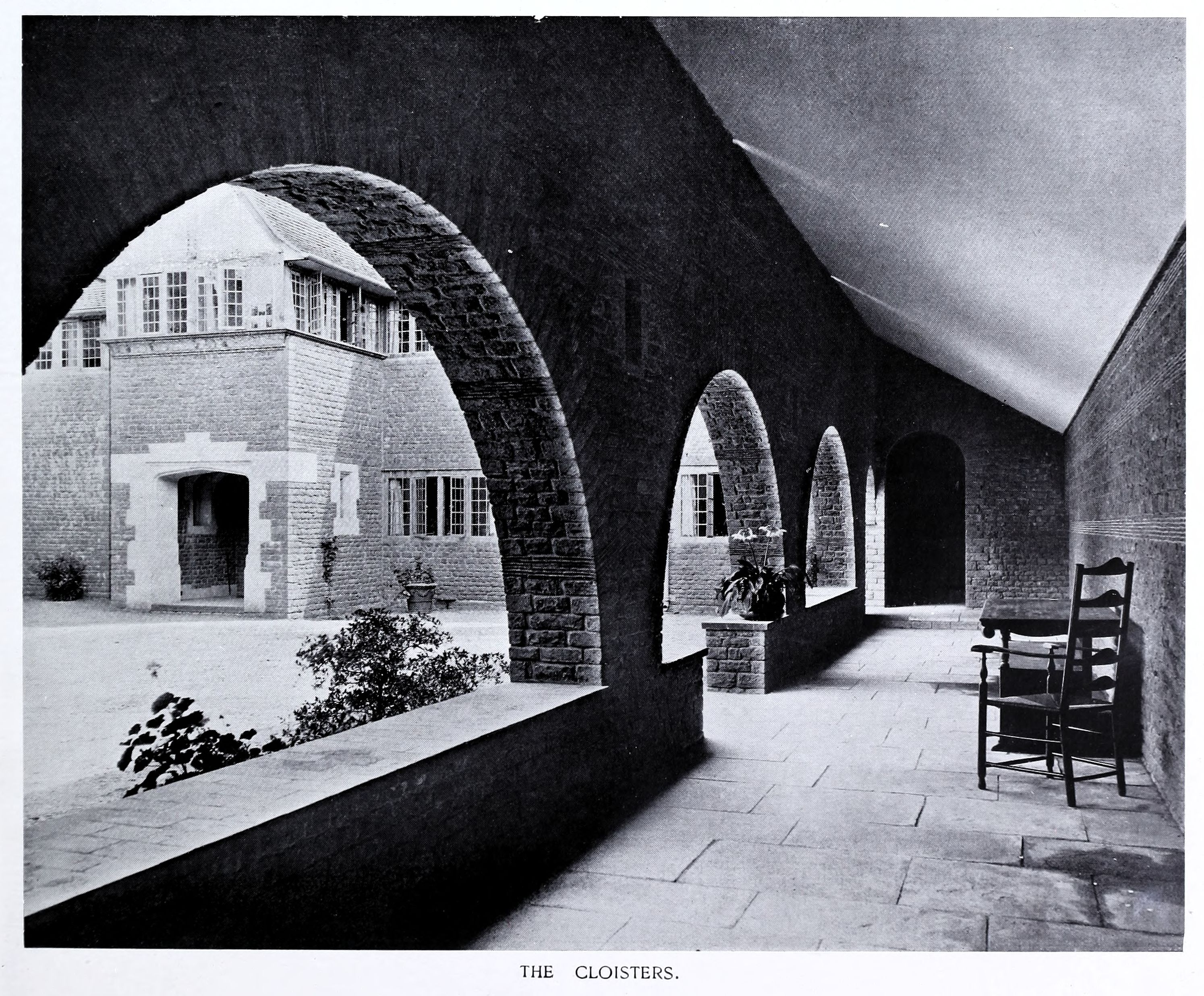
Cloister with courtyard and main entrance porch on left

Tim Richardson comments: "Orchards and Goddards, particularly, seem to suggest both grandeur and humility at the same time – the Holy Grail for the English sensibility." The writer, Clive Aslet, notes: "House and garden form an aesthetic unity at Orchards, the apotheosis of Lutyens' Surrey style."

== Bibliography ==
- Aslet, Clive (2011). The Arts & Crafts county house. London: Aurum Press. ISBN 978-1-84-513680-2.
- Brown, Jane (1982). Gardens of a Golden Afternoon. The Story of a Partnership: Edwin Lutyens and Gertrude Jekyll. London: Allen Lane. ISBN 0-7139-1440-8.
- Brown, Jane (1996). Lutyens and the Edwardians. London: Viking. ISBN 0-670-85871-4.
- Dunster, David, ed. (1986). Edwin Lutyens. London: Architectural Monographs and Academy Editions. ISBN 978-0-84-780235-7.
- Gradidge, Roderick (1981). Edwin Lutyens: Architect Laureate. London: George Allen and Unwin. ISBN 0-04-720023-5.
- Hussey, Christopher (1984). The life of Sir Edwin Lutyens. Melton: ACC Art Books. ISBN 978-0-90-746259-0.
- Nairn, Ian; Pevsner, Nikolaus; Cherry, Bridget (1995). Surrey. The Buildings of England. London: Penguin. ISBN 0-14-071021-3.
- O'Brien, Charles; Nairn, Ian; Cherry, Bridget (2022) [1962]. Surrey. The Buildings of England. London: Yale University Press. ISBN 978-0-30-023478-7.
- Richardson, Margaret (1981). "Catalogue of Works by Sir Edwin". Lutyens: The Work of the English Architect Sir Edwin Lutyens (1869–1944). London: Arts Council of Great Britain. ISBN 0-7287-0304-1.
- Richardson, Tim (2005). English gardens in the twentieth century. Aurum Press. ISBN 1-84513071-5.
- Ridley, Jane (2002). The architect and his wife. London: Chatto & Windus. ISBN 978-0-70-117201-5.
- Tankard, Judith B. (2004). Gardens of the Arts and Crafts Movement: Reality and Imagination. New York: Harry N. Abrams. ISBN 0-8109-4965-2.
- Tankard, Judith B. (2011). Gertrude Jekyll and the country house garden. London: Aurum Press. ISBN 978-1-84-513624-6.
- Tankard, Judith; Wood, Martin (2015). Gertrude Jekyll at Munstead Wood. Pimpernel Press. ISBN 978-1-9102-5805-7.
- Weaver, Lawrence (1987) [1913]. Houses and gardens by E.L. Lutyens. Woodbridge: Antique Collectors' Club. ISBN 978-0-90-202898-2.
- Wilhide, Elizabeth (2012). Sir Edwin Lutyens: Designing in the English Tradition. London: National Trust Books. ISBN 978-1-90-789227-1.
- Wood, Martin, ed. (2006). The unknown Gertrude Jekyll. London: Frances Lincoln Ltd. ISBN 978-0-71-122611-1.
