= Costelloe Lodge =

- Location within Ireland
- 53.2787°N 9.5368°W
- Type: House
- Location: Casla, County Galway, Ireland

History
- Built: c.1913, rebuilt 1925

Site notes
- Architect: Edwin Lutyens
- Architectural style: Arts and Crafts
- Governing body: Privately owned protected structure (Galway County Council RPS #734)

Costelloe Lodge is an early 20th-century building in Casla, County Galway, Ireland. It was designed by Edwin Lutyens for J. Bruce Ismay, chairman of the White Star Line, after Ismay's original fishing lodge was burnt out in an IRA attack in 1922. Ismay had bought the house a year after the Titanic disaster and, largely ostracised by society, spent much time at the lodge until his death in 1937. After the attack on the house Ismay engaged Lutyens to undertake a major reconstruction. The garden was laid out by Lutyens’ long-time collaborator Gertrude Jekyll. Little documented and unreferenced in the major studies of Lutyens, the lodge remains privately owned and is a protected structure.

== History and architecture ==
J. Bruce Ismay succeeded to the chairmanship of the White Star Shipping Line in 1899, on the death of his father. In 1912 he joined the RMS Titanic on its maiden voyage across the Atlantic. The ship struck an iceberg and sank, with the loss of 1,514 passengers and crew. Ismay took a place in the last lifeboat to leave the ship, an act that led to severe public criticism. Ismay was largely ostracised from society after his rescue from the Titanic, and spent much of his time at Costelloe until his death in 1937. (Note: The extent of Ismay’s exclusion from society after the Titanic’s sinking has been exaggerated. His entry in the Oxford Dictionary of National Biography makes clear that he did not become a recluse.) He had bought the original fishing lodge at Casla in 1913 and, a keen angler himself, visited frequently. In 1922 the lodge was burnt out in an arson attack by the IRA and Ismay commissioned Lutyens to rebuild it.

Lutyens had established himself as one of England's leading architects of country houses. In his study of English domestic buildings, Das englische Haus, published in 1904, Hermann Muthesius had written of him, "He is a young man who has come increasingly to the forefront of domestic architects and who may soon become the accepted leader among English builders of houses". Muthesius’ prediction was fulfilled; over the course of the next twenty years Lutyens became preeminent as a designer of country houses, began the construction of New Delhi and became the foremost architect of memorials to the British dead of the First World War. (Note: Lutyens’ Cenotaph on Whitehall in London has become Britain’s national memorial. In a letter of thanks written after its unveiling, the then Prime Minister, David Lloyd George, described it as, “a national shrine, not only for the British Isles but for the whole Empire”.)

The rebuilding of Costelloe was completed by 1925 and the house is designed in Lutyens’ trademark Arts and Crafts style. The plan is long and irregular, with a total of nine bays under sweeping slate roofs. The construction material is rendered limestone rubble. The house is little documented and is not referenced in the major studies of Lutyens and his work. (Note: Neither Christopher Hussey’s official biography, The Life of Sir Edwin Lutyens, nor the catalogue for the 1982 exhibition at the Hayward Gallery which did much to restore Lutyens’ reputation, make mention of the lodge.) The lodge is a protected structure and remains privately owned.

== Sources ==
- Amery, Colin; Richardson, Margaret; Stamp, Gavin (1981). Lutyens: The Work of the English Architect Sir Edwin Lutyens. London: Arts Council of Great Britain. ISBN 978-0-728-70303-2.
- Hussey, Christopher (1989) [1950]. The Life of Sir Edwin Lutyens. Woodbridge: Antique Collectors Club. ISBN 978-0-907-46259-0.
- Muthesius, H. (1979) [1904]. The English House (Single volume ed.). Frogmore: Granada Publishing. ISBN 978-0-258-97101-7.
