= King's Somborne =

Village and parish in Hampshire, England

Coordinates: 51.0774°N 1.4873°W

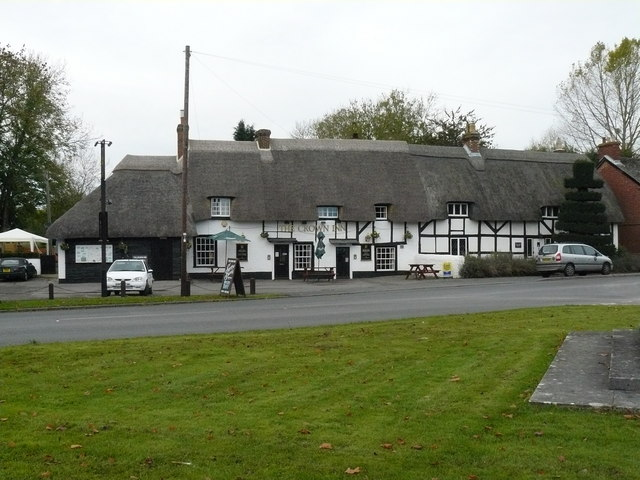
- The Crown Inn

- Location within Hampshire
- Population: 1,702 (2011 Census including Ashley, Brook, Horsebridge, Little Somborne and Marsh Court)
- OS grid reference: SU360310
- District: Test Valley
- Shire county: Hampshire
- Region: South East
- Country: England
- Sovereign state: United Kingdom
- Post town: STOCKBRIDGE
- Postcode district: SO20
- Dialling code: 01794
- Police: Hampshire and Isle of Wight
- Fire: Hampshire and Isle of Wight
- Ambulance: South Central
- UK Parliament: Romsey and Southampton North

King's Somborne is a village in Hampshire, England. The village lies on the edge of the valley of the River Test.

== Location ==
King's Somborne is a large parish covering 6,813 acres (2,757 ha), of which 47 acres (19 ha) are covered by water. Most of the ground is low-lying, with a high point at 351 ft (107 m). Park Stream, a branch of the Test, flows through John of Gaunt's Deer Park, which is west of the village and contains the site of a fish pond. It was once known as How Park, possibly through the association of a William de Ow with the parish.

== Name ==
The parish has had several names: Sunburne (11th century); Sombourne (12th century); Sumburn Album (13th century); Kingsomborne, Sumbourne Regis (14th century)

== History ==
King's Somborne was included in the Domesday Book in 1086 when it was claimed by the King's bailiff by the King in lordship and known as "Sunburne". As a part of the Crown's lands, it was not assessed for taxation. The book records 25 villagers, eight smallholders, two slaves and seven freedmen. Three mills and two churches are also reported and land for ten ploughs in addition to meadow land and pasture.

The two churches as of 1086 were the King's Somborne Church and, perhaps, the church at Upper Eldon. The present Church of St Peter and St Paul, part of which dates to the early 13th century, probably occupies the site of one of the original churches.

Over subsequent years, the name of the parish containing the village changed, to Sumburne in the 11th century, Sombourne in the 12th, Sumburn Album in the 13th and to Kingsomborne and Sumbourne Regis in the 14th century.

== Deer Park ==
William de Briwere the Elder, was given 400 acres of land for hunting by King John. He created a deer park in 1200, when it was known as How Park. His permission included the rights to chase of hare, fox, cat and wolf through all the king's land and use of the hares, pheasants and partridges throughout all his own lands, as also licence to enclose two coppices. William obtained permission from the Prior and convent of Winchester Cathedral Priory, to einclose a part of Houghton so as to extend the park. His descendant, Patrick de Chaworth, obtained from the king an additional charter in 1252 to enclose How Wood. William also founded a priory of Augustinian monks in 1201 at Mottisfont nearby. John of Gaunt, Duke of Lancaster, inherited the manor of Somborne through marriage. The manor of Somborne was a Royal Estate until fairly recent times. Local tradition asserts that John of Gaunt had a palace was sited behind the church in the village which was later rebuilt as a manor house. By 1840 its remains were only 14 ft high when it was demolished. The deer park was eventually named after John of Gaunt. Descendants of the Duke of Lancaster also had "free chase" in Painholt in 1353.

King James and Anne of Denmark stayed for two nights at King's Somborne as the guests of Sir Richard Gifford in August 1603. When King's Somborne was granted in 1628 to Edward Ditchfield, John Heighlord, Humphrey Clarke and Francis Mosse as trustees for the Corporation of London, Painholt Chase was specifically excepted. The estate was granted in 1638 by Charles I to Sir William Waller and his heirs. Multiple changes in ownership then followed.

== Notable buildings ==
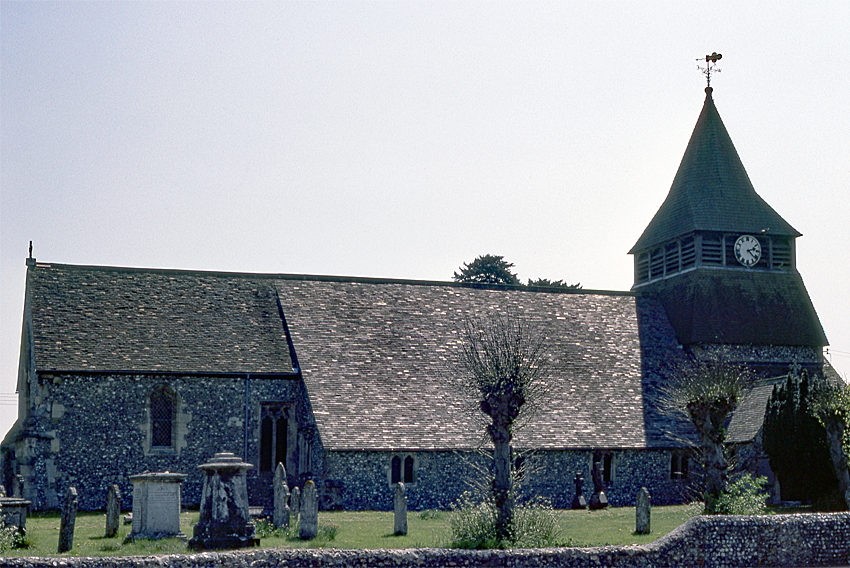
St Peter and St Paul's church, Kings Somborne

The village has about 100 listed buildings and structures including the Sir Edwin Lutyens designed Marsh Court, Compton Manor, thatched cottages, 18th century buildings such as the Old Vicarage and 19th century brick built cottages roofed in slate. King's Somborne War Memorial was designed by Lutyens and unveiled in 1921; the commission originated through Herbert Johnson, for whom Lutyens designed the nearby country house at Marshcourt earlier in the 20th century. During the war, Johnson and his wife ran the mansion as a military hospital.

The Anglican church of St Peter and St Paul is a grade II* listed building.

== Education ==
=== State ===
Primary:

- King's Somborne Church of England Primary School
