= Grade II* listed buildings in Mole Valley =

Mole Valley shown within Surrey

There are over 20,000 Grade II* listed buildings in England. This page is a list of the fifty Grade II* listed buildings in the district of Mole Valley. For links to similar lists for the other 10 districts of Surrey see Grade II* listed buildings in Surrey.

Name	Location	Type	Completed (Note: The date given is the date used by Historic England as significant for the initial building or that of an important part in the structure's description.)	Date designated	Grid ref. (Note: Sometimes known as OSGB36, the grid reference is based on the British national grid reference system used by the Ordnance Survey.) Geo-coordinates	Entry number (Note: The "List Entry Number" is a unique number assigned to each listed building and scheduled monument by Historic England.)	Image
Church of St James	Abinger	Church	Early 12th century	11 November 1966	TQ1149445957; 51°12′07″N 0°24′20″W	1378082	Church of St James More images
Church of St John the Baptist	Oakwood Hill, Abinger	Church	1879	11 November 1966	TQ1278738036; 51°07′50″N 0°23′22″W	1028844	Church of St John the Baptist More images
Crossways Farm House	Abinger	Farmhouse	1610	11 November 1966	51°12′52″N 0°24′51″W	1189524	Upload Photo
Goddards	Abinger Common, Abinger	Country House	1910	7 February 1972	TQ1201945389; 51°11′48″N 0°23′53″W	1028841	Goddards More images
Paddington Farmhouse	Abinger Hammer, Abinger	Farmhouse	16th century	11 November 1966	TQ1005847045; 51°12′43″N 0°25′33″W	1189342	Upload Photo
Betchworth House	Betchworth	Country House	Late 17th century	11 November 1966	TQ2110349547; 51°13′56″N 0°16′01″W	1028786	Betchworth House More images
The Old House	Betchworth	House	Early 18th century	11 November 1966	TQ2108249831; 51°14′05″N 0°16′01″W	1293777	The Old House More images
Bonnetts	Capel	House	17th century	11 November 1966	TQ1679237750; 51°07′38″N 0°19′57″W	1378124	Bonnetts
Green's Farm House	Kingsland, Capel	House	16th century	29 September 1987	TQ1938141161; 51°09′26″N 0°17′39″W	1191632	Green's Farm House More images
Taylors	Capel	House	16th century	7 March 1977	TQ1817938703; 51°08′07″N 0°18′44″W	1378127	Taylors
Highworth Farmhouse	Charlwood	Dairy	Late 15th century or Early 16th century	11 November 1966	TQ2308642594; 51°10′10″N 0°14′27″W	1248602	Highworth Farmhouse More images
Providence Chapel	Charlwood	Chapel	c. 1800	7 April 1983	TQ2466241225; 51°09′24″N 0°13′08″W	1277978	Providence Chapel More images
The Manor House	Charlwood	Hall House	15th century or 16th century	11 November 1966	TQ2409941317; 51°09′28″N 0°13′36″W	1248380	Upload Photo
Church of St Bartholomew	Leigh	Church	15th century	11 November 1966	TQ2245346944; 51°12′31″N 0°14′54″W	1028748	Church of St Bartholomew More images
Leigh Place	Leigh	House	17th century	11 November 1966	TQ2247147287; 51°12′42″N 0°14′53″W	1028747	Upload Photo
Park House Farm House	Mynthurst, Leigh	House	17th century	29 September 1987	TQ2171644326; 51°11′07″N 0°15′35″W	1378119	Upload Photo
Church of St Michael	Mickleham	Church	10th century	28 November 1951	TQ1706853376; 51°16′03″N 0°19′24″W	1028835	Church of St Michael More images
Juniper Hill	Mickleham	Country House	c. 1780	28 November 1951	TQ1712552936; 51°15′49″N 0°19′22″W	1028833	Upload Photo
Norbury Park	Norbury Park, Mickleham	Country House	1774	28 November 1951	TQ1598553706; 51°16′15″N 0°20′20″W	1228829	Norbury Park More images
Stables and Kitchen Wings at Norbury Park	Norbury Park, Mickleham	Kitchen		28 November 1951	TQ1593153708; 51°16′15″N 0°20′22″W	1228830	Upload Photo
The Old House	Mickleham	House	1636	28 November 1951	TQ1707853580; 51°16′10″N 0°19′23″W	1028837	Upload Photo
Church of St Peter	Newdigate	Church	12th century	11 November 1966	TQ1976442059; 51°09′55″N 0°17′19″W	1378141	Church of St Peter More images
Hay Barn to South of Home Farm House	Newdigate	Hay Barn	1411-1422	11 November 1966	TQ2068940704; 51°09′10″N 0°16′33″W	1028716	Upload Photo
Home Farm House and Nos 1 and 2 Cottages	Newdigate	House	15th century	11 November 1966	TQ2066040742; 51°09′12″N 0°16′34″W	1378140	Upload Photo
Old Barn at Home Farm	Newdigate	Timber Framed Barn	1484-1491	29 September 1987	TQ2070040712; 51°09′11″N 0°16′32″W	1028717	Upload Photo
Church of St Margaret	Ockley	Church	12th century	11 November 1966	TQ1568040655; 51°09′12″N 0°20′50″W	1028694	Church of St Margaret More images
Church of St Barnabas	Ranmore Common, Wotton	Church	1859	11 November 1966	TQ1457050457; 51°14′30″N 0°21′36″W	1189879	Church of St Barnabas More images
Leith Hill Place	Wotton	Country House	c. 1600	11 November 1966	TQ1338342362; 51°10′09″N 0°22′47″W	1028801	Leith Hill Place More images
The Temple, South of Wotton House	Wotton Park, Wotton	Garden Temple	reputedly 1649	11 November 1966	TQ1216246900; 51°12′37″N 0°23′44″W	1028807	The Temple, South of Wotton House
Wotton House	Wotton	Country House	Early 17th century	11 March 1987	TQ1216146966; 51°12′39″N 0°23′44″W	1189814	Wotton House More images
Ashtead Park Farm House	Ashtead Park	House	c1730 rebuilt	7 September 1951	TQ1954458657; 51°18′52″N 0°17′10″W	1294698	Upload Photo
Ashtead Park House and attached Balustrades	Ashtead Park	House	Completed 1790	7 September 1951	TQ1951157928; 51°18′29″N 0°17′13″W	1028682	Ashtead Park House and attached Balustrades More images
Church of St Giles	Ashtead Park	Parish Church	Early 12th century	7 September 1951	TQ1928658005; 51°18′31″N 0°17′24″W	1028685	Church of St Giles More images
Bury Hill Gardens	Westcott	Coachmans Cottage	Mid 18th century	28 November 1951	TQ1483248744; 51°13′35″N 0°21′25″W	1228824	Bury Hill Gardens
Church of the Holy Trinity	Westcott	Church	1851-1852	11 June 1973	TQ1395048420; 51°13′25″N 0°22′11″W	1227892	Church of the Holy Trinity More images
Church of All Saints	Little Bookham	Church	c. 1100	7 September 1951	TQ1229454017; 51°16′27″N 0°23′30″W	1028606	Church of All Saints More images
Church of St Martin	Dorking	Church	1868-1877	11 June 1973	TQ1654049499; 51°13′58″N 0°19′56″W	1028904	Church of St Martin More images
Church of St Mary	Fetcham	Parish Church	11th century	7 September 1951	TQ1497755625; 51°17′17″N 0°21′09″W	1378187	Church of St Mary More images
Church of St Mary and St Nicholas	Leatherhead	Parish Church	Late 11th century	7 September 1951	TQ1675456161; 51°17′33″N 0°19′37″W	1190429	Church of St Mary and St Nicholas More images
Fetcham Park House	Mole Valley	House	1705-1710	7 September 1951	TQ1500355674; 51°17′19″N 0°21′08″W	1188810	Fetcham Park House More images
Le Pelerin	Fetcham	Aisled House	16th century or 17th century	7 September 1951	TQ1601256045; 51°17′30″N 0°20′15″W	1028662	Le Pelerin More images
Milton Court, including attached Forecourt Walls, Balustrading, Terrace, Piers, Urns and Ball Finials	Westcott	Dower House	1611	11 June 1973	TQ1514249349; 51°13′54″N 0°21′08″W	1230137	Milton Court, including attached Forecourt Walls, Balustrading, Terrace, Piers, Urns and Ball Finials More images
Pippbrook House	Dorking	Country House	Post medieval	11 June 1973	TQ1701049927; 51°14′12″N 0°19′31″W	1028875	Pippbrook House More images
Pixham Church	Dorking	Church	1901	11 June 1973	TQ1761550289; 51°14′23″N 0°19′00″W	1279086	Pixham Church More images
The Mausoleum to the Hope Family	Dorking	Mausoleum	1818	28 November 1951	TQ1750148479; 51°13′24″N 0°19′08″W	1028891	The Mausoleum to the Hope Family More images
Polesden Lacey	Great Bookham	Country House	1821-1824	7 September 1951	TQ1359152195; 51°15′27″N 0°22′25″W	1028665	Polesden Lacey More images
Rowhurst	Leatherhead	House	17th century	7 September 1951	TQ1582158602; 51°18′53″N 0°20′22″W	1293589	Upload Photo
The Running Horse Public House	Leatherhead	House	Early 19th century	7 September 1951	TQ1639156352; 51°17′40″N 0°19′56″W	1293800	The Running Horse Public House More images
Thorncroft Manor	Leatherhead	Manor House	Rear extension	7 September 1951	TQ1654155864; 51°17′24″N 0°19′48″W	1389370	Thorncroft Manor More images
20 - 22 High Street	Dorking	House	16th century	28 November 1951	TQ1653049334; 51°13′53″N 0°19′57″W	1028899	20 - 22 High Street
