= Oxmoor =

Oxmoor may refer to:

- Oxmoor Center, shopping mall in Louisville, Kentucky
- Oxmoor Copse, Surrey
- Oxmoor Farm, estate in Louisville, Kentucky
- Oxmoor House, book publishing division of Southern Progress Corporation
- Oxmoor, Alabama, a populated place located within the city of Birmingham
