= War memorials in Surrey =

The outdoor war memorials of Surrey, erected to mark the carnage of the Great War take many forms, the most common being a cross, either Latin or Celtic in design, mounted on a plinth which has suitable inscriptions listing the names of the local war dead. Generally, World War II casualties have been added to the original memorial though in a few cases, such as at Ashford and Guildford, there is a separate memorial. A few display a lantern instead of a cross. The other main group of memorials consists of plinth mounted statues of either allegorical figures or of soldiers.

Indoor memorials, such as those found in churches, generally consist of either metal or stone plaques inscribed with the names of the dead.

In addition to the conventional memorials, funds raised for memorials were often used to endow community facilities such as village halls or gardens of remembrance.

== Outdoor memorials ==
Image	Name and location	Date	Description	Listing
	Abinger Common War Memorial Church Green, Abinger Common; 51°12′05″N 0°24′20″W	1920	Designed by Edwin Lutyens and erected in 1920. The memorial is constructed in Portland stone. Destroyed by a V-1 flying bomb in 1945, it was rebuilt in 1949.	Grade II; 1028839
	Alfold War Memorial St Nicholas's Church, Alfold; 51°05′45″N 0°31′12″W	28 November 1920	The memorial is carved from Cornish granite and consists of a Celtic cross with a sword carved in relief on the shaft. A tablet with the named of those who died in the Second World War is beneath the plinth.	Grade II; 1445240
	Ash War Memorial Ash Hill Road, Ash; 51°15′17″N 0°42′57″W	27 March 1921	Designed by Harold Falkner and erected on land donated by Isaac Field, whose son Ernest had been killed in the First World War.	None
	Ashford War Memorial Church Road and Fordbridge Road, Ashford; 51°25′58″N 0°27′43″W	24 September 1921	Constructed in Portland stone, the memorial consists of a winged Victory on top of a plinth which commemorates the Old Scholars of the West London District School who died in the First World War. A second monument, comprising a tablet represented as an open book, records the casualties of World War II.	Grade II; 1392259
	Ashtead War Memorial St George's Church, Barnett Wood Lane, Ashtead; 51°18′51″N 0°18′32″W	12 June 1920	Tall tapered Celtic cross on a square tapered plinth. The sides of the plinth have the names of the First World War casualties inscribed. At the base is a separate semi-raised marble tablet listing the World War II casualties.	None
	Badshot Lea War Memorial Badshot Lea Road, Badshot Lea; 51°13′51″N 0°45′45″W	22 October 1921	The monument consists of two stone tablets mounted one above the other, the upper one for the Great War casualties and the lower one for those of World War II.	None
	Men of Bagshot War Memorial St Anne's Church, Bagshot; 51°21′38″N 0°41′56″W	13 February 1921	Designed by Frank Ernest Howard. Originally located at the junction of London Road and Church Road, it was moved to its present location in 1948.	Grade II; 1454315
	Banstead War Memorial Banstead High Street, Park Road and Sutton Lane, Banstead; 51°19′29″N 0°11′41″W	5 June 1921	Designed by George Jack, sculpture by Lawrence Turner, local residents.	Grade II; 1458546
	Beacon Hill War Memorial St Alban's Church, Beacon Hill; 51°07′26″N 0°44′38″W	14 December 1919	Designed by Cecil Greenwood Hare in the form of a Calvary cross.	Grade II; 1439174
	Betchworth War Memorial St Michael's Church, Betchworth; 51°14′01″N 0°16′04″W	15 May 1921	The memorial was designed by Leonard Martin and is carved from Portland stone. It consists of a plain cross, mounted on a column that is supported by an octagonal plinth.	Grade II; 1391783
	Bisley War Memorial Guildford Road and Church Lane, Bisley; 51°19′38″N 0°38′20″W	25 September 1921	Erected by the London Necropolis Company. Dedicated by the Bishop of Winchester	None
	Blackheath War Memorial Blackheath, Wonersh; 51°12′28″N 0°31′12″W	27 March 1920	The memorial was designed by Charles Nicholson and is carved in Clipsham stone with a total height of 17 ft (5.2 m).	None
	Blindley Heath War Memorial Church of St John the Evangelist, Blindley Heath, Godstone; 51°11′47″N 0°03′12″W	14 November 1920	The memorial was relocated in 1989.	None
	Bramley War Memorial Horsham Road, Bramley; 51°11′41″N 0°33′30″W	12 June 1921	The memorial was designed by F.J. Hodgson and is carved in Portland stone with a total height of 13 ft (4.0 m). It is set into a curved wall at the crossroads to the north of the parish church.	None
	Bridley Manor War Memorial Fox Corner, Worplesdon; 51°17′07″N 0°37′06″W	1922	Designed by the London Necropolis Company and erected in 1922. The memorial takes the form of a Celtic cross carved in Cornish granite. It was struck by a vehicle and toppled in 1954, but was re-erected. It was subject to further repairs in 1977 and a restoration in 1994.	Grade II; 1469800
	Brockham War Memorial Christ Church, Brockham; 51°13′53″N 0°17′10″W	10 July 1921	Designed by Charles W. Bowles, the memorial is carved from Clipsham stone. It consists of a latin cross on an octagonal column, supported by a octagonal plinth. The steps are made of York stone. The boss of the column has four faces, each with a carved shield. The memorial was blow down in a storm in 2004. Following a restoration project in the summer of 2009, the memorial was rededicated on 12 November 2009.	Grade II; 1445157
	Buckland War Memorial Village Green, Buckland; 51°14′39″N 0°15′04″W	11 July 1920	Designed by Ebbutt and Sons, Croydon and constructed of Cornish granite. Dedicated by the Bishop of Sheffield, a former vicar of Dorking.	Grade II; 1437406
	Burpham War Memorial Churchyard of St Luke's, Burpham Lane, Burpham; 51°15′43″N 0°32′58″W	22 August 1920	The monument consists of a tapered granite cross on a plinth bearing the names of the casualties. Dedicated by the Bishop of Guildford	Grade II; 1437602
	Busbridge War Memorial Brighton Road, Busbridge; 51°10′39″N 0°36′08″W	23 July 1922	Designed by Edwin Lutyens.	Grade II*; 1044531
	Byfleet War Memorial High Road, Byfleet; 51°20′N 0°29′W	1928	Predominately brick-built cenotaph with stone capping. The name panels are cast in bronze.	Grade II; 1484775
	Camberley Memorial Cross Haig Road, Camberley; 51°20′21″N 0°44′57″W	30 August 1922	Unveiled by Prince Arthur, Duke of Connaught and Strathearn, on land granted with a 999 year lease from the War Office.	Grade II; 1464742
	Capel War Memorial Church of St John the Baptist, Capel; 51°09′14″N 0°19′12″W		Celtic cross on plinth mounted shaft.	None
	Caterham Hill War Memorial St Lawrence Church, Church Road, Caterham; 51°16′56″N 0°05′09″W	12 March 1921	The memorial takes the form of a Calvary figure in Portland stone. It was designed by Thomas Mewburn Crook.	Grade II; 1439357
	Charlwood War Memorial The Street, Charlwood; 51°09′21″N 0°13′35″W	9 May 1920	Designed by Ebbutt and Sons, Croydon	None
	Chertsey War Memorial Windsor Street, Chertsey, outside the parish church of St. Peter. 51°23′32″N 0°30′13″W	30 October 1921	The memorial, designed by Joseph Whitehead and Sons, features a statue of a soldier raising his helmet in salute. It was dedicated by the Bishop of Guildford.	Grade II; 1452800
	Chiddingfold War Memorial St Mary’s Church, Chiddingfold; 51°06′35″N 0°37′47″W	1923	Amongst the names of the men of the parish who died is that of Margaret Trevenen Arnold. Margaret was one of the first volunteer nurses to serve abroad, at a hospital in Le Treport. She died of pneumonia on 12 March 1916 and is buried in Le Treport Military Cemetery.	Grade II; 1441325
	Chilworth War Memorial Dorking Road, Chilworth; 51°12′57″N 0°31′21″W		Described by Historic England as "A simple yet dignified Latin cross memorial influenced by Blomfield’s Cross of Sacrifice".	Grade II; 1448322
	Chipstead War Memorial Church Green, Star Lane, Hooley, near Chipstead. 51°17′32″N 0°09′42″W	3 April 1920	The memorial consists of a floriated cross, shaft mounted above a plinth.	Grade II; 1441041
	Chobham War Memorial High Street, Chobham and Cannon Crescent; 51°20′52″N 0°36′09″W	28 August 1919	The memorial was a gift from Miss Catherine Mary Percival, of Chobham House, who commissioned the London Necropolis Company to erect the monument. It is 12 ft (3.7 m) high and carved from grey Forest of Dean stone.	Grade II; 1438598
	Churt Memorial Column Old Kiln Lane, Churt; 51°08′20″N 0°46′52″W		A brick and stone built column.	None
	Claygate War Memorial Church Road, Claygate; 51°21′33″N 0°20′21″W	6 March 1921	The memorial is carved from Portland stone and consists of a fleur-de-lys cross, around 5 m (16 ft) high, mounted on an octagonal plinth. It is surrounded by a memorial garden and was restored in 2012.	Grade II; 1426566
	Coldharbour War Memorial Abinger Road Coldharbour; 51°10′55″N 0°21′26″W		The memorial consists of a tapered granite column with the names inscribed on each side.	Grade II; 1447484
	Compton War Memorial The Street, Compton; 51°12′53″N 0°38′03″W	23 April 1922	Designed by Mary Watts who also supervised the construction. The memorial was dedicated by Rev A B Gwyn, the rector of Compton.	Grade II; 1429139
	Cranleigh War Memorial High Street Cranleigh; 51°08′31″N 0°29′30″W	5 December 1920	Designed by Frederick Hodgson and constructed by Thorpes, local builders. It was dedicated by Rev. Philip Cunningham.	Grade II; 1421568
	Dorking War Memorial South Street, Dorking; 51°13′51″N 0°20′03″W	17 July 1921	Designed by Thomas Braddock	Grade II; 1392420
Awaiting photo.	Dorking St Martin's Church War Memorial St Martin's Church, Church Street, Dorking; 51°13′58″N 0°19′56″W		Stone Latin cross mounted on square stone plinth with four step base.	Listed curtilage structure to Grade II* listed church.
	Dormansland War Memorial Dormans High Street, Dormansland; 51°09′35″N 0°00′20″E	20 December 1919	Designed by Ebbutt and Sons, Croydon	None
	Dunsfold War Memorial Dunsfold Common Road, Dunsfold; 51°06′51″N 0°33′46″W	1 April 1934	Designed by W. D. Caröe	Grade II; 1441453
	East Clandon War Memorial The Street, East Clandon; 51°15′18″N 0°28′54″W	28 November 1920	Designed by Harry Stuart Goodhart-Rendel, the memorial is carved from Doulting stone and has a total height of 15 ft (4.6 m). It consists of a cross on an octagonal shaft, supported by a plinth.	Grade II; 1429610
	East Horsley War Memorial Church of St Martin of Tours, Ockham Road South, East Horsley; 51°15′50″N 0°25′55″W	16 August 1920	The memorial takes the form of a 12 ft high (3.7 m) cross, carved in Cornish granite.	None
	Effingham War Memorial St Nicholas's Church, Church Street, Effingham; 51°16′16″N 0°23′56″W	9 May 1918		None
	Egham War Memorial St John's Church, Egham; 51°25′57″N 0°32′41″W	18 September 1920	A Latin cross mounted on an octagonal plinth bearing the names of the dead.	None
	Elstead War Memorial Thursley Road, Elstead; 51°11′01″N 0°42′24″W	27 June 1920	The memorial takes the form of a granite Celtic cross standing on a Bargate stone plinth.	None
	Epsom War Memorial Ashley Road and Treadwell Road, Epsom; 51°19′16″N 0°15′36″W	11 November 1923	Designed by Aston Webb, the memorial consists of a tall, rough-hewn, white granite Celtic cross. The names are inscribed in panels on a wall behind the cross. The cross was erected in 1921 but the name panels were not added until 1923. The gates at the entrance to the cemetery were erected to commemorate the members of the University and Public Schools Brigade which was hosted in Epsom.	Grade II; 1406252
	Esher Memorial Cross Esher Green, Lammas Lane, Esher; 51°22′15″N 0°22′00″W	1920?	Designed by Thomas Graham Jackson and carved in Portland stone, the memorial consists of a Latin cross on top of a tapering shaft mounted on an octagonal plinth. The Great War casualties are listed on bronze panels on alternate faces of the plinth, with World War II names on the intervening stone panels.	Grade II; 1424130
	Ewhurst War Memorial The Mount, Ewhurst; 51°09′11″N 0°26′30″W	7 November 1920	The memorial consists of a granite Celtic cross mounted on a tapered plinth. It was unveiled by Mr Walter Webb, whose son, Captain Evelyn Maxwell Webb, is listed on the memorial.	Grade II; 1444722
	Farnham War Memorial Gostrey Meadow, Farnham; 51°12′48″N 0°47′42″W	10 April 1921	Designed by W. C. Watson and unveiled by Lieutenant-General, the Earl of Cavan and Major-General Sir Walter Campbell.	Grade II; 1467667
	Forest Green War Memorial Forest Green Village Hall, Horsham Road, Forest Green; 51°09′33″N 0°23′38″W			None
	Frensham War Memorial Frensham Road, Frensham; 51°10′00″N 0°47′17″W	19 December 1920	Designed by Robert Morley, the memorial consists of an intricately carved Celtic cross mounted on a plinth.	None
	Godalming War Memorial Riverside park below St Peter & St Paul's church 51°11′15″N 000°36′57″W	25 September 1921	Designed by A R Powys and dedicated by Rev. Fanshawe, vicar of Godalming. The Latin cross, mounted on a plinth, was positioned to be equally visible from both the churchyard and the park.	Grade II; 1447942
	Godstone War Memorial St Nicholas's Church, Godstone; 51°14′47″N 0°03′26″W			None
	Grayswood War Memorial Grayswood Road, Grayswood; 51°06′07″N 0°41′38″W	1 November 1920	The memorial consists of a Latin cross mounted on a plinth. On one face of the plinth there is a relief of a kneeling soldier looking up at Christ upon the Cross. On the front of the shaft is a niche containing an armour-clad figure.	None
	Great Bookham War Memorial St Nicolas's Church, Great Bookham; 51°16′46″N 0°22′27″W	6 February 1921	A rare example of a cross with a carved figure of Christ on a war memorial.	Grade II; 1392030
	Guildford War Memorial Grounds of Guildford Castle; 51°14′3″N 0°34′18″W	6 November 1921	Unveiled by Lieutenant General Sir Edmond Elles, Deputy Lieutenant of Surrey and dedicated by the Bishop of Winchester. The original monument was in the form of an arch with the names of the casualties inscribed on the supporting pillars. In 1995, a second monument, in the form of a plinth, was placed beneath the arch and inscribed with the names of the war dead from World War II.	Grade II; 1447488
	Guildford Post WW2 War Memorial Grounds of Guildford Castle; 51°14′2″N 0°34′18″W	30 September 2018	Designed by David Annand, this is an unconventional memorial consisting of a bronze statue of a soldier holding a plaque bearing the names of men of the town killed in post-World War II conflicts.	None
	Hale War Memorial Upper Hale Road, Hale; 51°14′02″N 0°47′48″W	14 August 1921	Designed by William Curtis Green.	None
	Haslemere War Memorial High Street, Haslemere 51°05′16″N 0°42′34″W	12 June 1921	Designed by Inigo Triggs	Grade II; 1390566
	Hersham Memorial Cross Hersham Memorial Garden, Burwood Road, Hersham; 51°21′54″N 0°24′00″W	November 7, 1920	The 6 m-tall (20 ft) Latin cross is built of Hoptonwood stone with a cover over the cross head and a tapering octagonal shaft. The square plinth rests on an octagonal base of three steps. Carved into the south-eastern face of the plinth are the names of those who died in the First World War, and there is a dedication to those who died in the Second World War on the north-western face. The garden surrounding the cross was created in 1952 and became a Fields in Trust Centenary Field in 2014.	Grade II; 1427595
	Horley War Memorial Horley Recreation Ground, Brighton Road, Horley; 51°10′30″N 0°10′14″W	3 March 1922	Designed by Ebbutt and Sons, Croydon.	Grade II; 1457672
	Horsell War Memorial High Street, Horsell; 51°19′43″N 0°33′42″W	3 September 1920	Designed by Arthur Stratton, the memorial consists of a cross in Portland stone on an octagonal shaft, supported by a cruciform plinth. It is set in a paved semi-circular enclosure, surrounded by a low brick wall.	Grade II; 1425786
	Hurst Green War Memorial Woodhurst Lane, Hurst Green, Oxted; 51.2449°N 0.0023°W			None
	King Edward's School War Memorial King Edward's School, Witley; 51°08′15″N 0°38′39″W	11 September 1920	The memorial takes the form of a stone cross in Portland Stone on an octagonal shaft and was designed by Henry T. Edwards. The octagonal plinth is supported by a base of three octagonal steps.	Grade II; 1434041
	Kingswood and Tadworth War Memorial Brighton Road, Kingswood; 51°17′08″N 0°13′13″W	27 November 1920	Designed by Frederick Bligh Bond	Grade II; 1457282
	Laleham War Memorial Broadway and Shepperton Road, Laleham; 51°24′33″N 0°29′25″W	1920s	An inscribed Latin cross mounted on a stone capped brick plinth.	None
	Lightwater War Memorial Guildford Road, Lightwater; 51°21′06″N 0°39′54″W		A wheel-head cross carved from Cornish granite	Grade II; 1441517
	Limpsfield War Memorial St Peter's Church, High Street, Limpsfield; 51°15′39″N 0°00′44″E			None
	Lingfield War Memorial High Street, Lingfield; 51°10′27″N 0°01′06″W	13 November 1920	Designed by Arthur Hayward, the memorial originally consisted of a gas lantern mounted on a shaft. The cross and lantern had been blown down by February 1945 and when re-erected, the gas lantern was replaced by an electric light.	Grade II; 1457964
	Little Bookham War Memorial All Saints' Church, Little Bookham; 51°16′27″N 0°23′29″W	27 February 1921	Cross carved from grey granite by Whitehead and Sons, Kensington	None
	Littleton War Memorial Church of St Mary Magdalen, Littleton; 51°24′24″N 0°27′43″W			None
	Long Ditton Memorial Cross Ditton Hill, Long Ditton; 51°22′54″N 0°18′54″W	7 December 1919	The memorial is carved from Portand stone and consists of a wheelhead cross on an octagonal shaft, mounted on an octagonal plinth. It is at the centre of a memorial garden.	Grade II; 1426583
	Lyne War Memorial Holy Trinity Church, Lyne; 51°22′52″N 0°32′32″W	9 October 1920	Carved in Portland stone by Farmer and Brindle	Grade II; 1441002
	Merrow War Memorial St John's Church, Merrow; 51°14′45″N 0°31′37″W	16 July 1920	Carved in sandstone, the memorial consists of a latin cross on an octagonal shaft. Each side of the square plinth has a relief carving of a rose.	Grade II; 1433598
	Merstham War Memorial London Road South, Merstham; 51°15′48″N 0°09′08″W	30 October 1921	The memorial takes the form of a Celtic cross carved in granite.	Grade II; 1458444
	Mickleham War Memorial St Michael's Church, Mickleham; 51°16′03″N 0°19′25″W	16 July 1920	A simple Celtic style cross mounted on a shaft rising from an inscribed plinth.	None
	Milford War Memorial Church of St John the Evangelist, Milford; 51°10′10″N 0°38′50″W	15 May 1921		None
	Molesey War Memorial Hurst Road, East Molesey; 51°24′16″N 0°20′45″W		The memorial consists of a square tapered limestone column some 4 m (13 ft) high.	Grade II; 1429204
	Newdigate War Memorial Church Lane, Newdigate; 51°09′54″N 0°17′19″W	1920	Designed by J Hatchard Smith, the shaft-mounted cross has a carved wreath draped over it.	None
	Nutfield War Memorial High Street, Nutfield; 51°14′20″N 0°07′51″W			None
	Ockham War Memorial Ockham Lane, Ockham; 51°17′56″N 0°27′52″W	c. 1922	Designed by Sidney Gambier-Parry, church architect and Ockham resident, the memorial is carved from Portland stone and consists of a Celtic cross with a tapering shaft supported by an octagonal plinth.	Grade II; 1437885
	Old Oxted War Memorial 49 High Street, Old Oxted; 51°15′09″N 0°00′55″W		The memorial consists of a wooden board attached to the side of a house. In the centre is a carved crucifix. On each side there are two metal panels bearing the names of the Great War casualties.	None
	Old Woking War Memorial St Peter's Church, Old Woking; 51°18′06″N 0°32′15″W	28 November 1920	Unveiled by: Admiral T P Walker, DSO. Dedicated by rev Norman Pares MA, Vicar of Horsell.	Grade II; 1432851
	Ottershaw War Memorial Christ Church, Ottershaw; 51°21′40″N 0°32′07″W	19 December 1920	Dedicated by the Bishop of Guildford.	None
	Outwood War Memorial Church of St John the Baptist, Brickfield Road, Outwood; 51°11′53″N 0°06′46″W	21 April 1920	The memorial is in the form of a Celtic cross.	Grade II; 1403249
	Oxshott War Memorial Oxshott Heath, Oxshott; 51°20′17″N 0°21′53″W	3 October 1920	Designed by W. D. Caröe, the memorial was carved in Clipsham limestone. Originally 25 ft (7.6 m) tall, the height was reduced after the memorial suffered damage in a storm. It is composed of a wheelhead cross on an octagonal column, resting on a square plinth. The base consists of five octagonal steps. The names of those who died in the Second World War are inscribed on the plinth, while those who died in the First World War are recorded on the steps.	Grade II; 1430670
	Oxted War Memorial Church Lane, Oxted; 51°15′25″N 0°0′27″W	26 February 1922	The memorial consists of a budded cross mounted on a hexagonal shaft rising from a square plinth.	None
	Peaslake War Memorial Peaslake Lane, Peaslake; 51°11′30″N 0°26′47″W	15 May 1921	The memorial is a simple cross mounted on a square plinth, described as "stylistically redolent of the period."	Grade II; 1444982
	Puttenham War Memorial The Street, Puttenham; 51°13′20″N 0°39′57″W	3 October 1920	The memorial is carved in sandstone and consists of a calvary cross on an octagonal shaft with an octagonal base.	Grade II; 1429562
	Pyrford War Memorial Church Hill, Pyrford; 51°18′50″N 0°30′33″W	18 July 1920	Dedicated by the Bishop of Guildford.	Grade II; 1432845
Awaiting photo	Redhill St John the Evangelist Church War Memorial Church Road, Redhill; 51°13′46″N 000°10′35″W	May 1920	Designed by Frank Loughborough Pearson.	Grade II; 1456650
	Reigate War Memorial Alma Road, Reigate; 51°14′36″N 0°12′10″W	November 1917	Designed by Messrs J Underwood and Son of London. The memorial was dedicated by the Rev HG Hill.	Grade II; 1430671
	Reigate and Redhill War Memorial Shaw's Corner, Redhill; 51°14′15″N 0°10′55″W	5 August 1923	Designed by Richard Reginald Goulden, the memorial was unveiled by Admiral of the Fleet, Earl Beatty.	Grade II*; 1242942
	Ripley War Memorial High Street, Ripley; 51°17′57″N 0°29′37″W	1 September 1920	Designed by C.F.M. Cleverly, the memorial is carved from Doulting stone.	None
	Rowledge War Memorial Cherry Tree Road, Rowledge; 51°10′53″N 0°49′32″W		The memorial was designed by H. Falkner.	None
	St Thomas-on-the-Bourne War Memorial Frensham, Farnham; 51°12′10″N 0°47′34″W	22 May 1921	Designed by Harold Falkner in the form of a Celtic wheel cross, the memorial is carved in Penryn granite and is 23 ft (7.0 m) high.	Grade II; 1466297
	Seale War Memorial Elstead Road, Seale; 51°13′21″N 0°43′01″W	9 May 1920	The memorial is 4 m (13 ft) high and consists of a small cross on an octagonal column, set on a three-stage plinth.	Grade II; 1429561
	Send War Memorial Send Road, Send; 51°17′32″N 0°32′08″W	16 January 1921	Unveiled by Colonel The Honourable A G Brodrick.	Grade II; 1437626
	Shackleford and Peper Harow War Memorial Shackleford Road, Shackleford; 51°11′44″N 0°39′21″W	6 November 1921	Designed by R.H. Butterworth, the memorial consists of a limestone cross on an octagonal shaft set on an octagonal plinth. The names of those who died in the Second World War were added in June 1950. Work on the memorial in 2004 included the replacement of the First World War names, which had been badly eroded. A further refurbishment in 2013 replaced worn York stone panels with new inscriptions in granite.	Grade II; 1429560
	Shalford War Memorial The Street, Shalford; 51°13′13″N 0°34′13″W	17 July 1921	Dedicated by the Bishop of Guildford. Badly damaged in a road traffic accident in 2022 but subsequently restored.	Grade II; 1393082
	Shamley Green War Memorial Christ Church, Shamley Green; 51°10′50″N 0°31′23″W	22 February 1920	The memorial takes the form of a stone Greek cross mounted on an octagonal shaft. The four-sided plinth is supported by an octagonal base.	Grade II; 1448366
	Shepperton War Memorial Russell Road roundabout, Shepperton; 51°23′28″N 0°27′0″W	27 March 1921	The 20 ft high (6.1 m) memorial is carved in Portland stone and takes the form of a cross mounted on an octagonal base. In 1987, the memorial was relocated around 10 m (33 ft) to the south to facilitate the construction of a bypass road.	None
	Shere War Memorial The Square, Shere; 51°13′09″N 0°27′50″W	8 October 1921	Designed by Spencer Munt, from Gomshall, the memorial is 18 ft (5.5 m) high and was dedicated by the bishop of Winchester. The Maltese cross and plinth are carved from Bargate stone and the column is carved from Yorkshire grit stone.	Grade II; 1432733
	Shottermill War Memorial St Stephen's Church, Shottermill; 51°05′12″N 0°44′11″W		The memorial is in the style of an in-filled lych gate with a crucifix above stone panels bearing the names of the dead of World War 1, the casualties of World War 2 are inscribed on the supporting pillars each side of the earlier panels.	None
	South Holmwood War Memorial Horsham Road, South Holmwood; 51°11′33″N 0°19′25″W	9 October 1921	Carved in Portland stone	Grade II; 1393446
	South Merstham War Memorial All Saints' Church, Merstham; 51°15′24″N 0°09′00″W	1 November 1920	The 3 m tall (9.8 ft) memorial is carved in Cornish granite and consists of a tapering shaft topped by a wheel cross. The original Victorian church next to the memorial was destroyed by a bomb on 19 April 1941 and was rebuilt to a design by E.F. Starling in 1951.	Grade II; 1458564
	South Park War Memorial, Reigate Church Road, South Park, Reigate; 51°13′37″N 0°12′29″W	14 November 1920	Designed by Vincent Hooper, the memorial takes the form of a tapered Latin cross, carved in Portland stone. The square, uppermost stage of the plinth is carved with a scroll motif, beneath which is an octagonal stage bearing the inscription Latin: Deus vult, lit. 'God wills it'. The names of those who died in the First and Second World War are carved on the lower stages of the plinth.	Grade II; 1458480
	Staines War Memorial Market Square, Staines-upon-Thames; 51°26′00″N 0°30′51″W	19 December 1920	Carved from Portland stone, the memorial takes the form of a winged figure of Victory holding a laurel wreath and a torch.	Grade II; 1440376
	Stanwell War Memorial High Street, Stanwell; 51°27′26″N 0°28′46″W		A baroque portland stone monument with an ornate plinth surmounted by a shaft with a ball on the end rather than the usual cross or lantern.	Grade II; 1393523
	Stoke-next-Guildford War Memorial Stoke Road, Guildford; 51°14′47″N 00°34′17″W	25 September 1921	Original erected north of St John’s Church, it was moved to its current position in 1989. It was designed by E.L. Lunn and the 12 ft high (3.7 m) Celtic cross is carved from Cornish granite.	Grade II; 1421067
	Sunbury War Memorial Cedars Recreation Ground, Green Street, Stanwell; 51°24′41″N 0°25′03″W	11 December 1920	Unveiled by Philip Pilditch, MP for Spelthorne, the memorial consists of a Portland stone cross on a York stone base. The plinth incorporates marble.	Grade II; 1428570
	Tandridge War Memorial St Peter's Church, Tandridge Lane, Tandridge; 51°14′34″N 0°01′57″W			None
	Thames Ditton War Memorial Giggs Green, Thames Ditton; 51°23′12″N 0°19′49″W	27 February 1921	Designed by H.T. Edwards, the memorial is carved from Cornish granite. It consists of a 25 ft tall (7.6 m) cross on which a bronze sword an laurel wreath are mounted. The names of those who died in the World Wars are inscribed on the octagonal plinth, which are supported by three steps.	Grade II; 1430721
	Thorpe War Memorial Mill Lane, Thorpe; 51°24′23″N 0°32′00″W	6 November 1920	The memorial takes the form of a Celtic carved from Cornish granite.	None
	Thursley War Memorial St Michael's Church, Highfield Lane, Thursley; 51°08′47″N 0°42′49″W		The memorial consists of a Celtic cross on a tapered square plinth, situated close to the west door of the church. WWI names are carved on east face and WWII names are carved on west face.	None
	Tilford War Memorial Church of All Saints, Tilford; 51°10′51″N 0°45′06″W	early 1920s	A Portland stone hooded calvary cross on a tapered column, set on a square stone base.	Grade II; 1431833
	Valley End War Memorial Valley End Road, Chobham; 51°21′55″N 0°37′55″W	12 June 1921	Designed by Charles Stanley Kimpton and erected in 1921. The memorial takes the form of a limestone wheel cross. A garden surrounding the memorial was added in 1922.	Grade II; 1433986
	Virginia Water War Memorial Station Parade, Virginia Water; 51°24′09″N 0°33′50″W	11 November 2018		None
	Walton-on-Thames War Memorial Memorial Garden, High Street, Walton-on-Thames; 51°23′02″N 0°25′03″W	8 July 1921	Unveiled by David Beatty, 1st Earl Beatty, the memorial consists of a stone wall, surmounted by the Royal Arms, with five bronze plaques recording the names of those who died in the First World War. The granite plinths in front of the memorial record the names of those who lost their lives in the Second World War and were erected in September 2002.	Grade II; 1432721
	Walton on the Hill War Memorial Breech Lane, Walton-on-the-Hill; 51°16′54″N 0°14′50″W	30 May 1920	Designed by L. Stanley Crosbie, the memorial is carved from Portland stone and is 16 ft (4.9 m) high. It consists of a stone cross, supported by a square pedestal and three octagonal steps at the base.	Grade II; 1457417
	War Memorial to the First World War Warlingham Green, Warlingham; 51°18′35″N 0°03′21″W	4 December 1921	Designed by J. E. Taylorsen, the memorial takes the form of a sculpture of a serviceman with a woman and child. In 1946, a rectangular tablet commemorating those who died in the Second World War was added to the base.	Grade II; 1029818
	West Byfleet War Memorial St John's Church, Parvis Road, West Byfleet; 51°20′17″N 0°30′11″W	16 November 1919	Designed by Reginald Blomfield, the memorial consists of a 13 ft high (4.0 m) cross on an octagonal base, both in Portland stone. Set into the cross is a bronze sword. The memorial was restored in the early 1990s, when the names of those who died in the Second World War were added. A rededication ceremony took place on 10 May 1992.	None
	West End War Memorial Church Road, West End; 51°20′32″N 0°38′38″W	3 April 1923	The memorial takes the form of a Celtic wheel cross and stands 3.3 m (11 ft) tall. It was originally erected at the junction of the High Street, but was moved to its current site in December 1972.	Grade II; 1406090
	West Molesey War Memorial Memorial Garden, Walton Road, West Molesey; 51°24′12″N 0°22′11″W		The 5.5 m-tall (18 ft) memorial takes the form of a rectangular pillar carved from Portland stone. Originally at the junction of New Road and Walton Road, it was moved to its present position after 1960 to facilitate a road-widening scheme.	Grade II; 1427656
	Weybridge War Memorial Queens Road and Hanger Hill, Weybridge; 51°22′15″N 0°27′04″W	24 March 1923	Designed by J. Hatchard Smith and carved in Portland stone, the memorial takes the form of a statue of a soldier standing on a square column.	Grade II; 1427261
	Windlesham War Memorial Church of St John the Baptist, Windlesham; 51°21′55″N 0°39′55″W	25 April 1920	The memorial is a granite wheel-head cross on a three-stepped York stone base.	Grade II; 1441513
	Witley War Memorial Petworth Road, Witley; 51°08′56″N 0°38′49″W	May 20, 1923		None
	Woking War Memorial Jubilee Square, Woking; 51°19′12″N 0°33′31″W	24 May 1922	Designed by Francis William Doyle Jones, the memorial consists of a bronze sculpture on a square sandstone column. Originally in Sparrow Park, it was relocated to Jubilee Square in 1975.	Grade II; 1443492
	Woldingham War Memorial Station Road, Woldingham; 51°17′10″N 0°02′14″W	25 October 2014	Designed by Liam O'Connor.	None
	Wyke and Normandy War Memorial Guildford Road, Normandy; 51°15′22″N 0°40′23″W	19 December 1920	The memorial consists of a Celtic cross on a plinth and stands on a plot of land leased from the War Office.	Grade II; 1452395

== Memorial buildings and gardens ==
Image	Name and location	Date	Description	Listing
	Ashtead Peace Memorial Hall Woodfield Lane, Ashtead; 51°18′36″N 0°17′59″W	1924	Built to commemorate the end of the Great War it is owned and run by volunteer trustees.	None
	Betchworth Village Memorial Hall Station Road, Betchworth; 51°14′40″N 0°16′03″W			None
	Burgh Heath War Memorial Hall Brighton Road, Burgh Heath; 51°18′19″N 0°13′09″W	8 October 1921		None
	Leatherhead Garden of Remembrance North Street, Leatherhead; 51°17′45″N 0°19′50″W	3 April 1921	Unveiled by Major General Sir John Longley K.C.M.G, C.B., the memorial was dedicated by the vicar of Leatherhead.	None
	Sutherland Memorial Park Clay Lane, Burpham 51°15′34″N 0°32′47″W	27 June 1956	Opened by the Duke of Edinburgh to commemorate the casualties of World War 2.	None
	St Tarcisius Church London Road, Camberley; 51°20′18″N 0°45′02″W	18 November 1924	Designed by Frederick Walters as a memorial to Catholic military officers who had died in the First World War.	Grade II; 1391327
	Windlesham Field of Remembrance Kennel Lane, Windlesham; 51°22′01″N 0°39′27″W	1950	The first 10 acres (4.0 ha) of the Field of Remembrance were dedicated in 1950. The 8.5-acre (3.4 ha) Admiral's Field was added in 1987.	None

== Indoor memorials ==
Image	Name and location	Date	Description	Listing
	Guildford railway station war memorial Guildford Railway Station, Walnut Tree Close, Guildford; 51°14′13″N 0°34′50″W	1922	A white stone tablet with the names of the station staff killed in the Great War. In addition there is a memorial to the 262 dead of the Southern Railway in World War II.	None
	Holmbury St Mary War Memorial Church of St Mary the Virgin, Holmbury St Mary; 51°11′18″N 0°24′47″W	26 March 1922		None
	Royal Horicultural Society war memorial The Old Laboratory Building, Wisley; 51°18′50.44″N 0°28′22.28″W	3 June 1921	Bronze plaque in a wooden frame commemorating the RHS students killed in the Great War. Unveiled by the President of the Royal Horticultural Society.	None

== See also ==
- List of public art in Surrey
