= St James's Church, Abinger Common =

Church of St James, Abinger Common
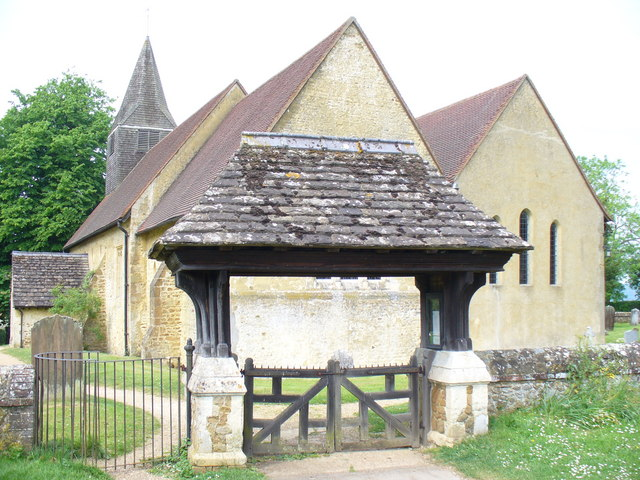
- Church of St James and lych gate

- Shown within Surrey
- 51°12′07″N 0°24′20″W
- Denomination: Church of England
- Churchmanship: Broad Church

History
- Dedication: Saint James

Architecture
- Heritage designation: Grade II* listed
- Designated: 11 Nov 1966

Administration
- Province: Canterbury
- Parish: Abinger

St James's Church stands on Abinger Lane in Abinger Common, a small village within the civil parish of Abinger in Surrey, south-eastern England. The church was built in the early 12th century and then rebuilt around 1220, and is today a grade II* listed building.

== History ==
The original nave was built in the 12th century (although the Domesday Book has mention of an earlier structure) and was rebuilt in 1220, after which the church was altered little until Victorian times. The present vestry, organ bay, and the south porch were all added during restoration work in 1857. The church was hit by a German V-1 flying bomb during the Second World War on 3 August 1944 and restored by Frederick Etchells in 1950 (moving the organ to the west end). The church was again restored after a fire in 1964.

== Architecture ==
The church is built predominantly from Bargate rubble, with ashlar dressings and a tiled roof. The porch has a slab roof and the bell tower and spire are covered by wood shingles. The structure consists of a nave, supported by buttressing, and chancel, with the chapel in the chancel at the north end; the vestry, organ bay, and porch to the south; and the bellcote to the west. The north and south sides of the nave contain lancet windows with round arches and the east a larger 15th-century stained-glass window. Other windows date from the 13th to the 19th centuries. The font dates from the 20th century.

== Features ==
Among the significant memorials in the church are a monument, built in 1910 by Albert Toft and dedicated to Alistair Mackenzie, and an art nouveau-style wall tablet. Outside are the village stocks and Abinger Common War Memorial, with which the church forms a group of listed buildings. The war memorial was designed by Sir Edwin Lutyens, who also designed the nearby house Goddards; it was damaged by the same V-1 flying bomb as the church, and was restored in 1948.

== See also ==
- Grade II* listed buildings in Mole Valley
- List of places of worship in Mole Valley
