= Abinger Common War Memorial =

War memorial in Abinger, Surrey, UK

- United Kingdom
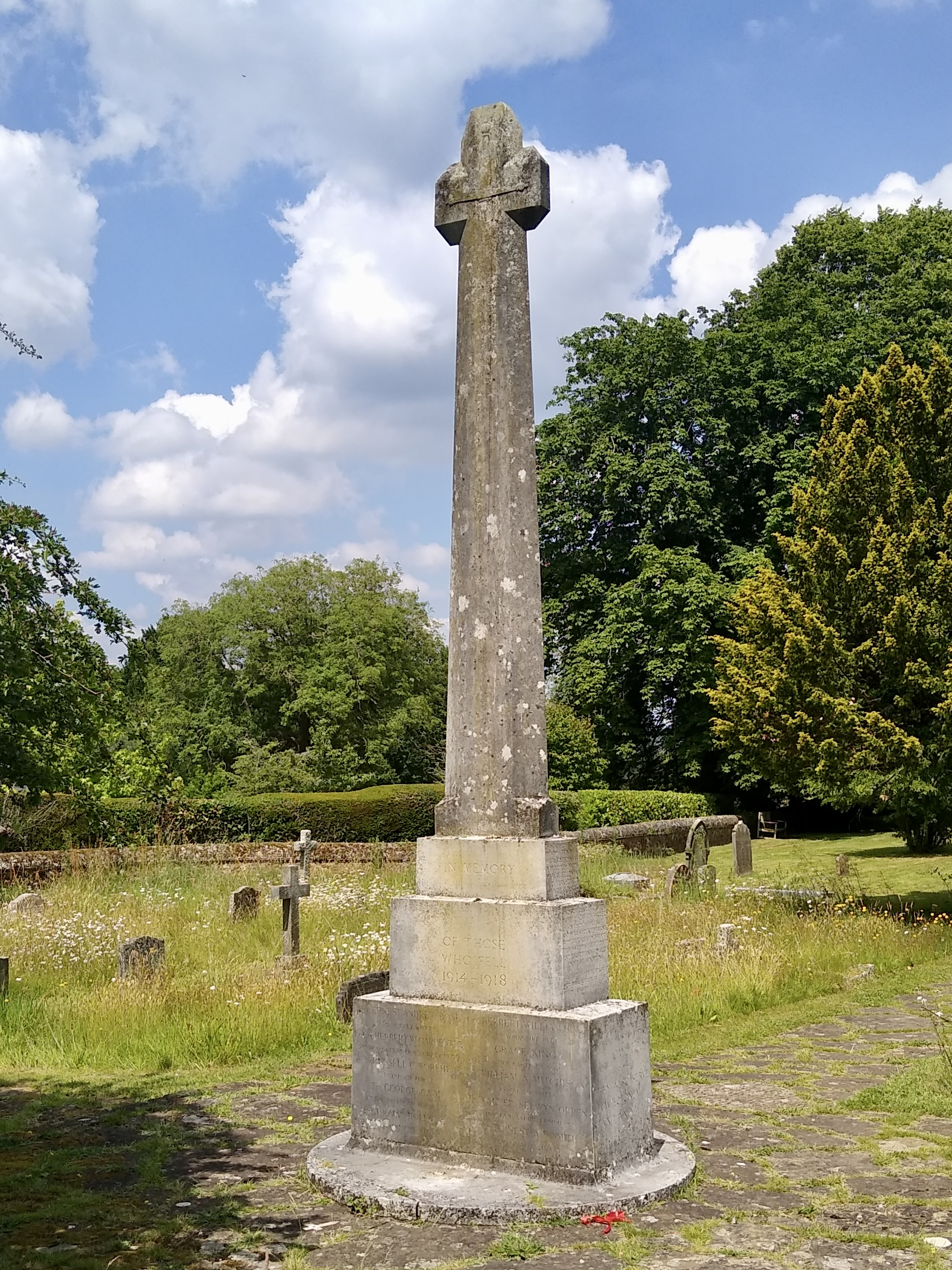
- For men from Abinger Common killed in the First World War
- Unveiled: 1920, 1949
- Location: 51°12′05″N 0°24′20″W; Church green, Abinger Common, Surrey near Dorking
- Designed by: Sir Edwin Lutyens

Listed Building – Grade II
- Official name: Abinger Common War Memorial
- Designated: 13 March 1974
- Reference no.: 1028839

Abinger Common War Memorial is a First World War memorial in the village of Abinger Common in Surrey, south-eastern England. The memorial was destroyed by a German bomb during the Second World War and rebuilt in the late 1940s. One of 15 war crosses by Sir Edwin Lutyens, it is a grade II listed building.

== Background ==
In the aftermath of the First World War and its unprecedented casualties, thousands of war memorials were built across Britain. Amongst the most prominent designers of memorials was the architect Sir Edwin Lutyens, described by Historic England as "the leading English architect of his generation". Lutyens designed the Cenotaph on Whitehall in London, which became the focus for the national Remembrance Sunday commemorations, as well as the Thiepval Memorial to the Missing—the largest British war memorial anywhere in the world—and the Stone of Remembrance which appears in all large Commonwealth War Graves Commission cemeteries and in several of Lutyens's civic war memorials. The Abinger Common memorial is one of fifteen War Crosses by Lutyens, all sharing a broadly similar design.

Many of Lutyens' commissions for war memorials originated with pre-war clients and friends. Although Margaret Lewin, who commissioned the Abinger common memorial, was not a previous client, it appears she was known to Lutyens as she lived close to Goddards, a country house in the village designed by Lutyens elsewhere in the village.

== History and design ==
The original memorial was presented to the village by Margaret Lewin, a resident of Abinger Common whose son—Charles McLean Lewin, a captain in the 4th Queen's Own Hussars—died in 1919. It was built by the stonemasons HT Jenkins and Sons of Torquay, Devon, who were responsible for several of Lutyens' war memorials, at a cost of £190, and unveiled in 1920. On 3 August 1944, during the Second World War, the memorial was struck by a German V-1 flying bomb and severely damaged, as was St James's Church; the memorial was rebuilt in honour of Mrs Lewin and her daughter in 1949.

The memorial stands outside the churchyard of St James' Church, on an axis with the south porch. It consists of a Portland stone cross—Lutyens' standard War Cross design, with short arms moulded high on a tapering shaft)—which sits on a plinth of three stone square blocks which is itself mounted on a shallow circular base. The western face of the cross contains a sword engraved in the stone, unique among Lutyens' War Crosses and more reminiscent of the sword on the Cross of Sacrifice by Reginald Blomfield, with whom Lutyens worked with the Commonwealth War Graves Commission. It is unknown whether the sword was an original feature or one added during the reconstruction.

The main inscription is on the east face of the plinth:

"THIS CROSS DESTROYED BY ENEMY ACTION IN 1944 WAS RE-ERECTED IN 1949 IN PROUD MEMORY OF MARGARET LEWIN OF PARKHURST ABINGER COMMON AND HER DEAR DAUGHTER MABEL ELIZABETH FARRER BY THEIR DESCENDANTS AND OF ALL WHO LIKE THE ABOVE BROUGHT PEACE & JOY THROUGH THEIR OWN RADIANT FAITH COURAGE AND FORGETFULNESS OF SELF UNDER ALL CONDITIONS / I CEASE NOT TO GIVE THANKS FOR YOU MAKING MENTION OF YOU IN MY PRAYERS. EPH 1:16 PRESENTED BY MARGARET LEWIN OF PARKHURST, ABINGER IN MEMORY OF HER SON CHARLES MCCLEAN LEWIN 4th HUSSARS CML B 1880 D 1919 / THEY ALSO SERVE WHO ONLY STAND AND WAIT / ALSO THE ELDEST SON OF ABOVE B 1912 D 1947".

The south face is inscribed "THE WORLD WAR / MCMXIV / MCMXIX" and the east "IN MEMORY OF THOSE WHO FELL 1914 – 1918", below which are the names of the village's war dead.

Abinger Common War Memorial was designated a grade II listed building on 13 March 1974. The memorial is one of a group of listed buildings around the church green, including the church itself, which is listed at grade II*. In November 2015, as part of the commemorations of the centenary of the First World War, Lutyens's war memorials were recognised as a "national collection" and all of his free-standing memorials in England were listed or had their listing status reviewed and their National Heritage List for England list entries were updated and expanded.

== See also ==
- Busbridge War Memorial, another Lutyens War Cross in Surrey
- War memorials in Surrey

== Bibliography ==
- Skelton, Tim; Gliddon, Gerald (2008). Lutyens and the Great War. London: Frances Lincoln Publishers. ISBN 9780711228788.
