= Edward Wilkins Waite =

English painter

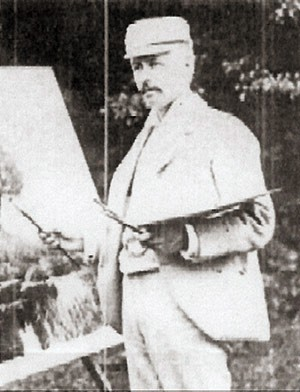
Edward Wilkins Waite

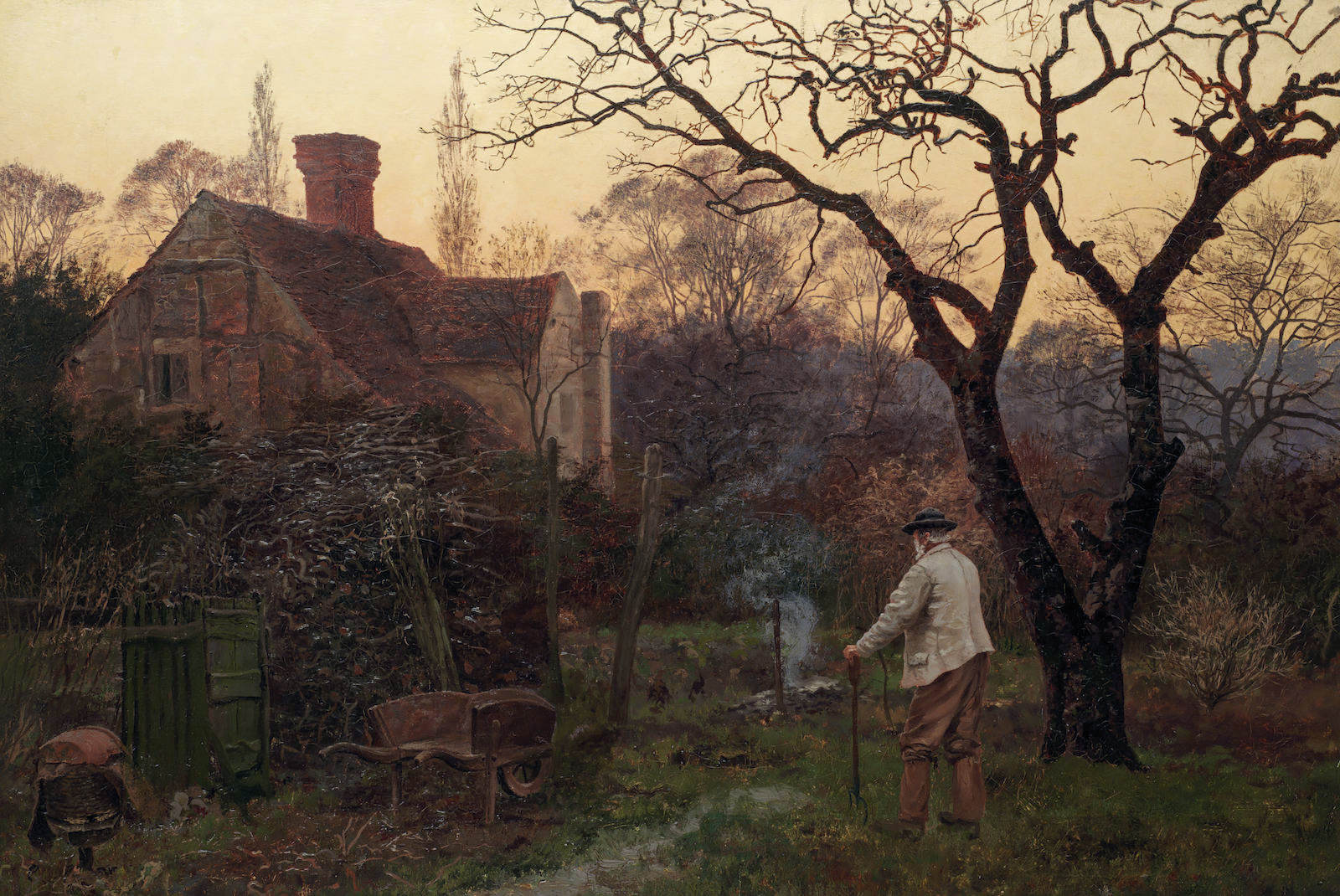
Evening, Brockham

Edward Wilkins Waite RBA (14 April 1854–1924) was a prolific English landscape painter.

Waite was born in Leatherhead, Surrey, the son of the Rev. Edward Waite, MA, and his wife, Cleopha Julia (née Dukes)—there were six sons and two daughters in total. His grandfather, William Watkin Waite, was a miniaturist, his father an amateur watercolourist, and three of his brothers—Charles, Harold, and Arthur—also became artists.

He was educated at the Mansion House Grammar School in Leatherhead. In 1874 he travelled to Ontario, Canada, to work as a lumberjack. On his return he took up painting as a profession, exhibiting often at the Royal Academy, London, from 1878 to 1919. He also exhibited at many other major galleries, in London and the regions, and became a member of the Royal Society of British Artists (RBA) in 1893.

In 1891, Waite married Barbara Isabella Tait (1862–1950). They had one son and two daughters. They lived at Peaslake and Abinger Hammer, in Surrey, before moving to Woolhampton in Berkshire in 1910. They moved back to Surrey and then East Sussex in 1915. Waite died in Fittleworth, Sussex, in 1924.

Waite was a landscape painter and worked in oils. Much of his output depicts rural scenes in his native Surrey.

== External links and references ==
- E W Waite biography (Burlington Paintings)
- E W Waite and family - paintings (Dreweatt Neate auctioneers catalogue, 24 Oct 2007)
- Paintings by E W Waite (Burlington Paintings)
- Paintings by E W Waite ("My Art Prints")
- At Peaslake (Oil on canvas, 1897 - Christie's)
- A view to the sea (Oil on canvas - Christie's)
- Cornfield harvest (Oil on canvas - Croydon Museum)
- An autumn moonrise (oil on canvas - Bolton museum and archive service)
