= Oxmoor Copse =

Woodland in Surrey, England

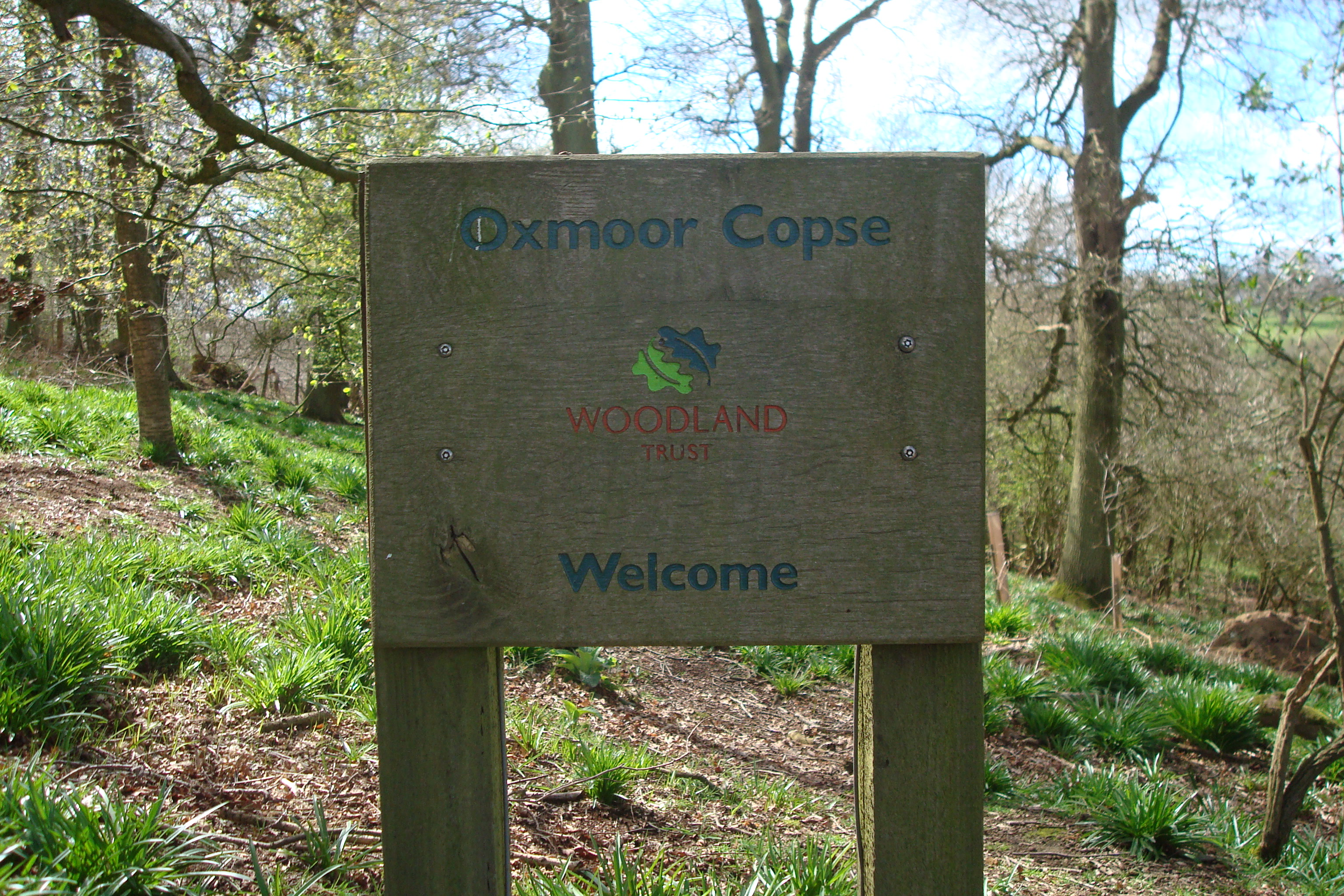
- The copse is managed by the Woodland Trust

- Location within Surrey

Geography
- Location: Surrey, England
- OS grid: TQ097467
- Coordinates: 51.2095°N 0.4304°W
- Area: 1.23 hectares (3.0 acres)

Administration
- Authority: Woodland Trust

Oxmoor Copse is just south of the village of Abinger Hammer and to the west of the village of Abinger Common, in Surrey. It is 1.23 hectares (3.0 acres) and is in an AONB lying within the Surrey Hills. The previous owners gave the copse to the Woodland Trust as a gift.

The copse lies on Greensand and the soil is acidic. The main trees are mature oaks and hazel; there are also bluebells. A considerable number of trees were blown down in the 1987 storm. Replanting took place in 1991. Arable and pastoral land surrounds the copse. On the fringes of the copse there is a considerable amount of Common Cudweed but generally the copse is species poor.

The grid reference is TQ 090 467
