= Abinger Hammer =

Village in Surrey, England

Coordinates: 51°13′00″N 0°25′58″W

- Village
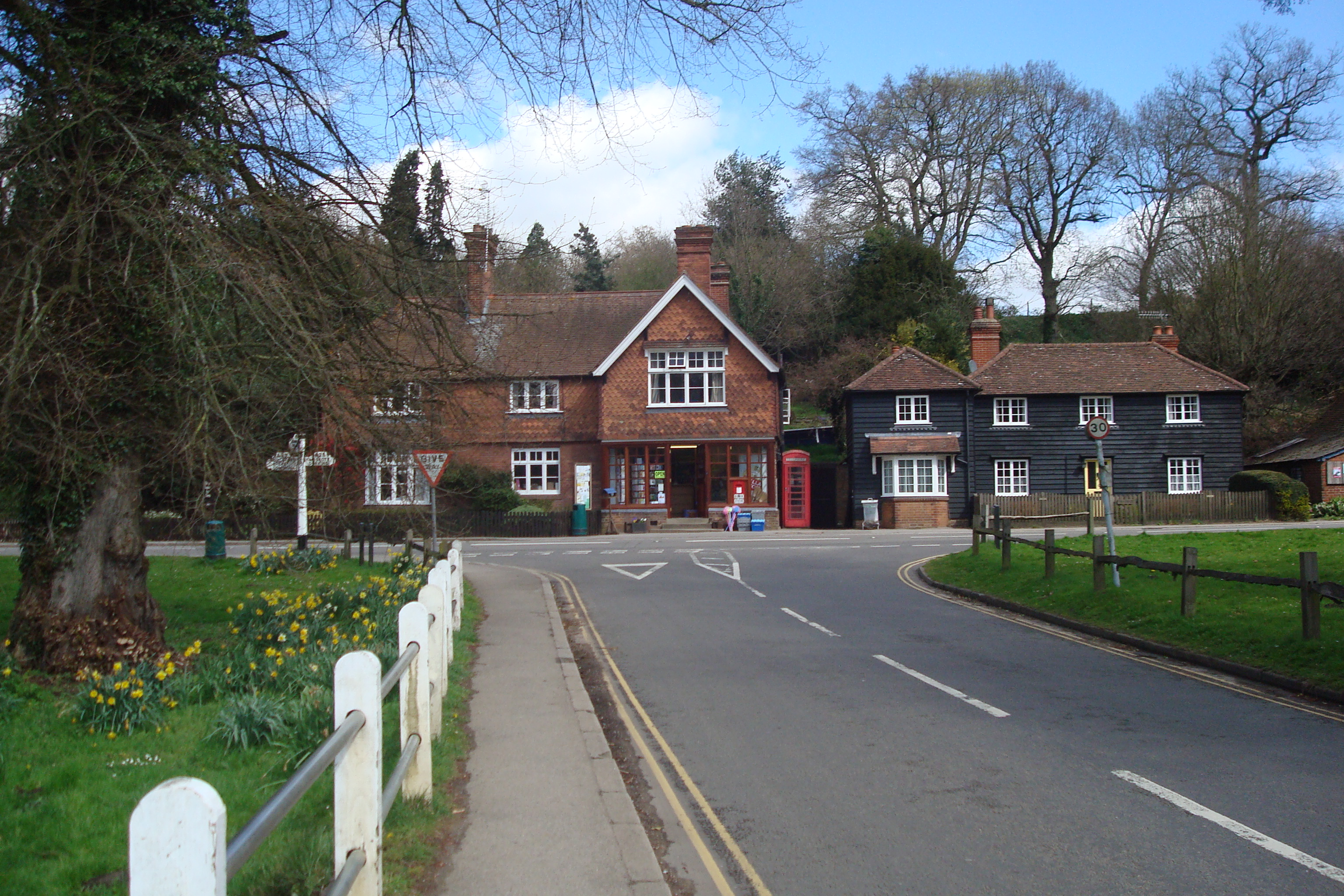
- Abinger Hammer general store

- Location within Surrey
- OS grid reference: TQ095475
- District: Mole Valley
- Shire county: Surrey
- Region: South East
- Country: England
- Sovereign state: United Kingdom
- Post town: Dorking
- Postcode district: RH5
- Dialling code: 01306
- Police: Surrey
- Fire: Surrey
- Ambulance: South East Coast
- UK Parliament: Dorking and Horley

Abinger Hammer is a village in the Mole Valley district of Surrey, England. It lies in the Vale of Holmesdale in the Surrey Hills National Landscape and is located on the A25 about 6 miles (9.7 km) east of Guildford and 4 1/2 miles (7.2 km) west of Dorking. The village is named after its water-powered iron forge.

== Geography ==
Abinger Hammer lies within the parish of Abinger which includes Abinger Common and Sutton Abinger. Other neighbouring villages are Wotton and Gomshall.

The River Tillingbourne flows through the village.

== History ==
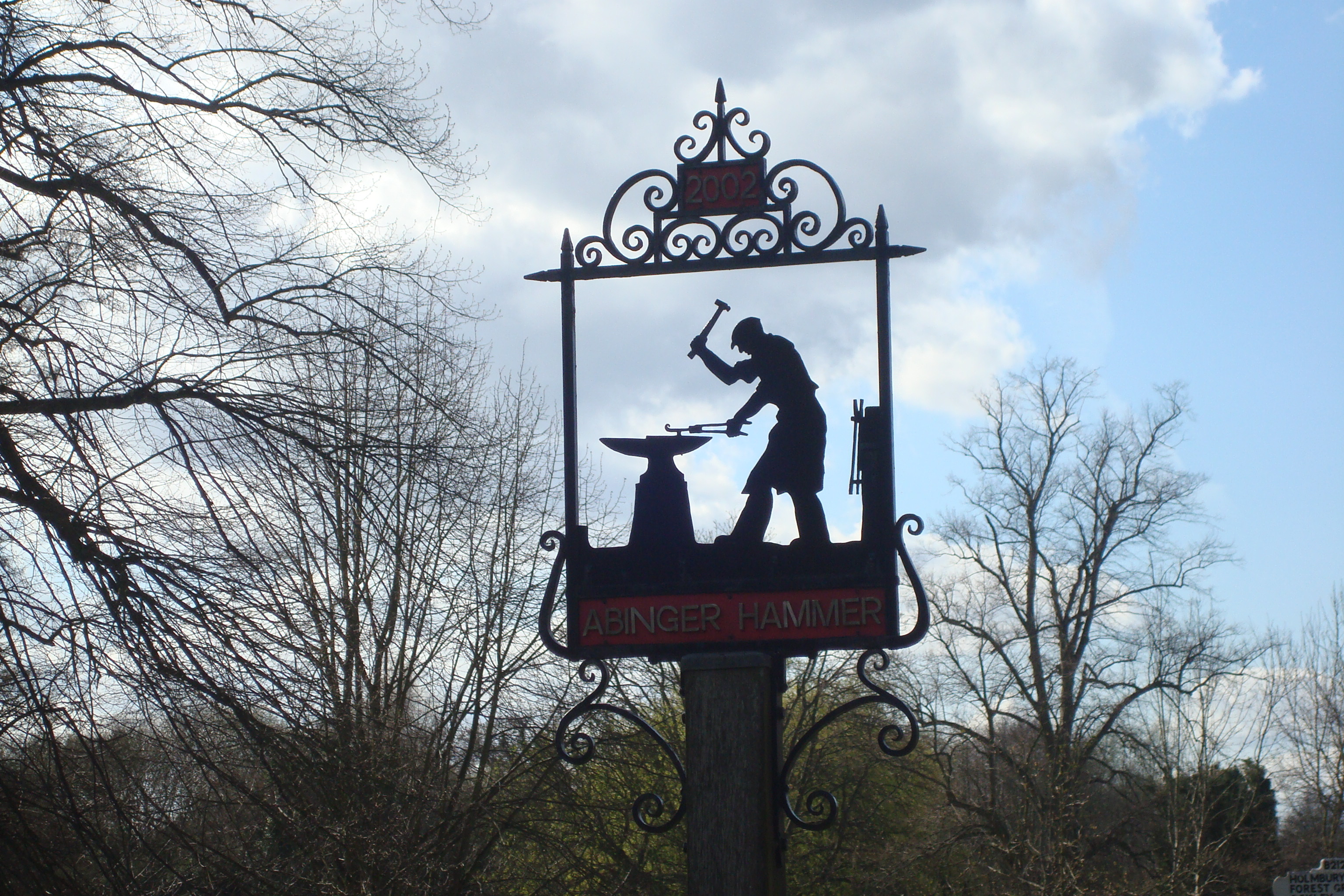
Abinger Hammer was a focus for forges

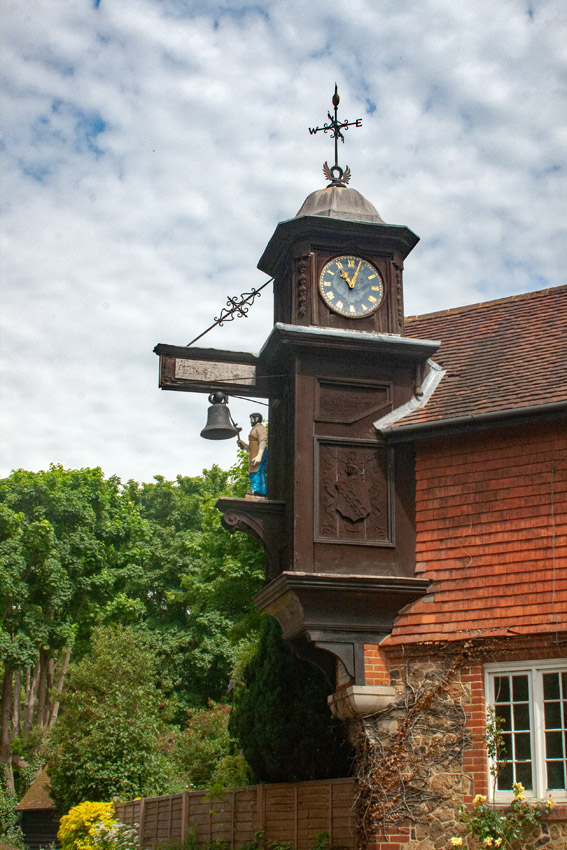
Abinger Hammer clock

The river Tillingbourne was enchannelled in the 16th century, creating a hammer pond, provided water power for Abinger Hammer Mill which worked Sussex-sourced iron. The pond has since been adapted for the cultivation of watercress.

Abinger hammer mill was in operation during the second half of the 16th century. The reputed manufacture of guns for use against the Spanish Armada has no basis in fact; the mill being incapable of casting iron. The waters of the Tillingbourne powered the water wheel which drove the heavy 400 kg (880 lb), hammer of the forge. The forge closed in 1787 despite attempts to save or convert it. A contemporary forge, Finch Foundry, survives in Devon.

The clock which overhangs the main road portrays the figure of "Jack the Blacksmith", who strikes the hour with his hammer. The clock bears the motto "By me you know how fast to go". The clock was given in memory of the first Lord Farrer of Abinger Hall who died in 1899. The clock represents the iron industry and the role played by the county of Surrey in the industrial past.

== Transport ==
The A25 runs through the village. Abinger is approximately 1 mile (1.6 km) east of Gomshall railway station on the North Downs Line between Redhill and Guildford.

== Sights ==
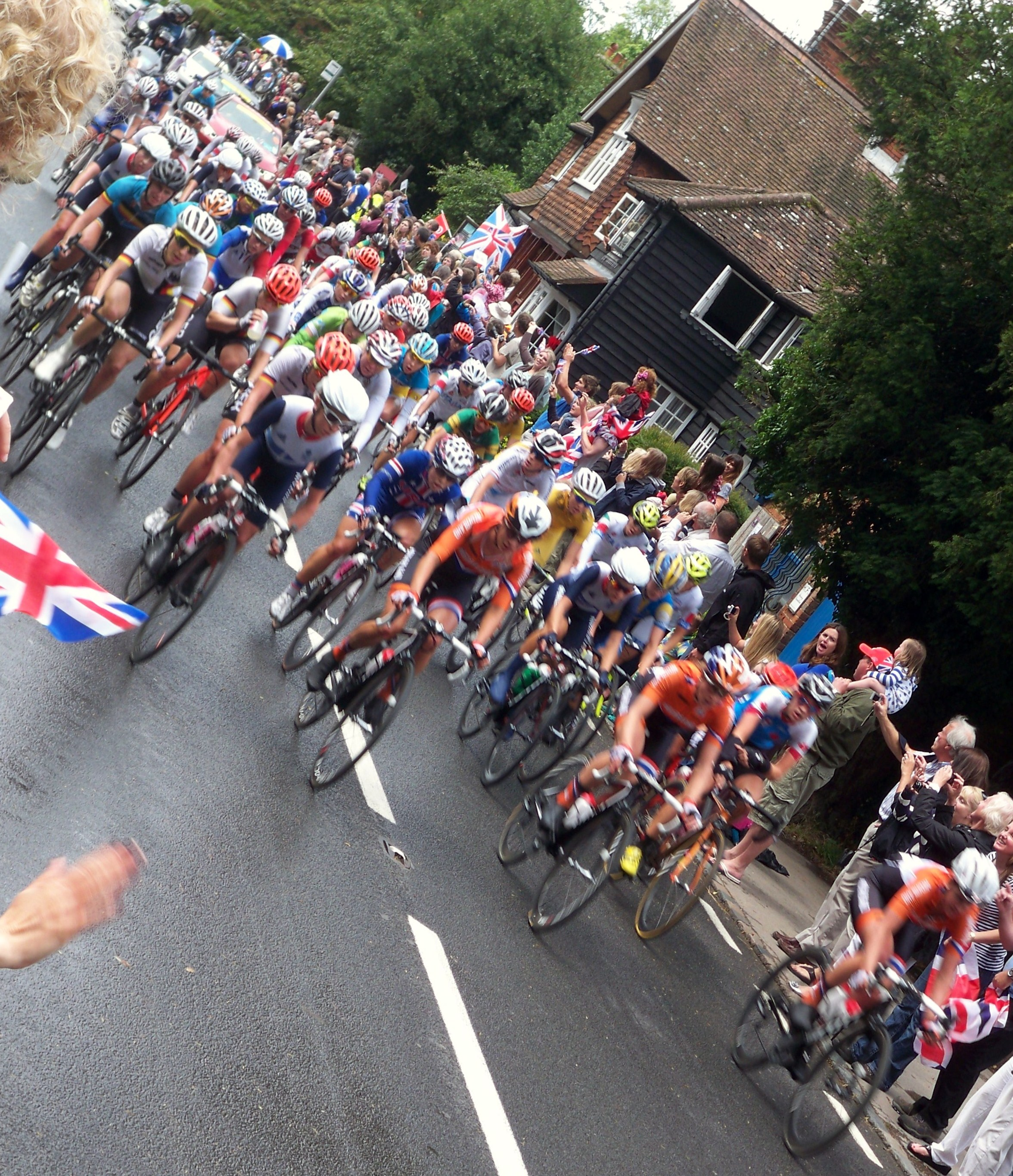
The 2012 Women's Olympic Cycle Race passing through Abinger Hammer on its way to Box Hill

In summer the village green in Abinger is popular with locals and tourists who like to picnic on the grass whilst watching a game of cricket in surroundings which are quintessentially English. The cricket pitch borders the Tillingbourne – the Post Office sells nets for children to "fish" in this shallow and sandy stream. Annie's tearoom is next to the Post Office and offers lunches and teas seven days a week.

== Education ==
After Abinger Hammer village school was closed by the LEA in 1982, the local community took over the running of it. As of 2008 the school had only sixteen students. A small group of trustees worked to raise funds to maintain the building and to pay the staff but the number of students reduced further, until the school was forced to close in July 2009.

== Nature ==
Oxmoor Copse is an Area of Outstanding Natural Beauty, recognised for its plant species and its aesthetic quality. It is south of the village.

== People ==
During the years 1925 to 1945, the novelist E. M. Forster lived in Abinger Hammer with his mother Alice Clare, in a house designed by his father, the architect Eddie Morgan Forster. The house had previously been occupied by his aunt Laura. Forster was obliged to leave this home in 1946 as the landlord refused to renew the lease.

Edward Wilkins Waite (1854–1924), landscape painter, lived for a time at Abinger Hammer. He was born in Leatherhead, Surrey, and much of his work depicted rural scenes in the county – including at least one picture, Old Willows, painted in the vicinity of the village.

David Nobbs gave Abinger Hammer as the location of the home of Uncle Percy Spillinger, played by late actor Tony Sympson, in Episode 4, Series 1 of The Fall and Rise of Reginald Perrin.

The actor John Gordon Sinclair lives in Abinger Hammer.

== Abinger Hall ==
Abinger Hammer is also home to Abinger Hall, a late 18th-century country estate, which has since fallen into disrepair. Abinger Hall was the home of William Frederick Scarlett, Baron Abinger and Helen Scarlett, Lady Abinger. It was also the birthplace of Ella Campbell Scarlett, who was the first female doctor of the state of Bloemfontein, South Africa. The Victorian house was demolished in 1959.
