= Goddards =

House in Surrey, South East England

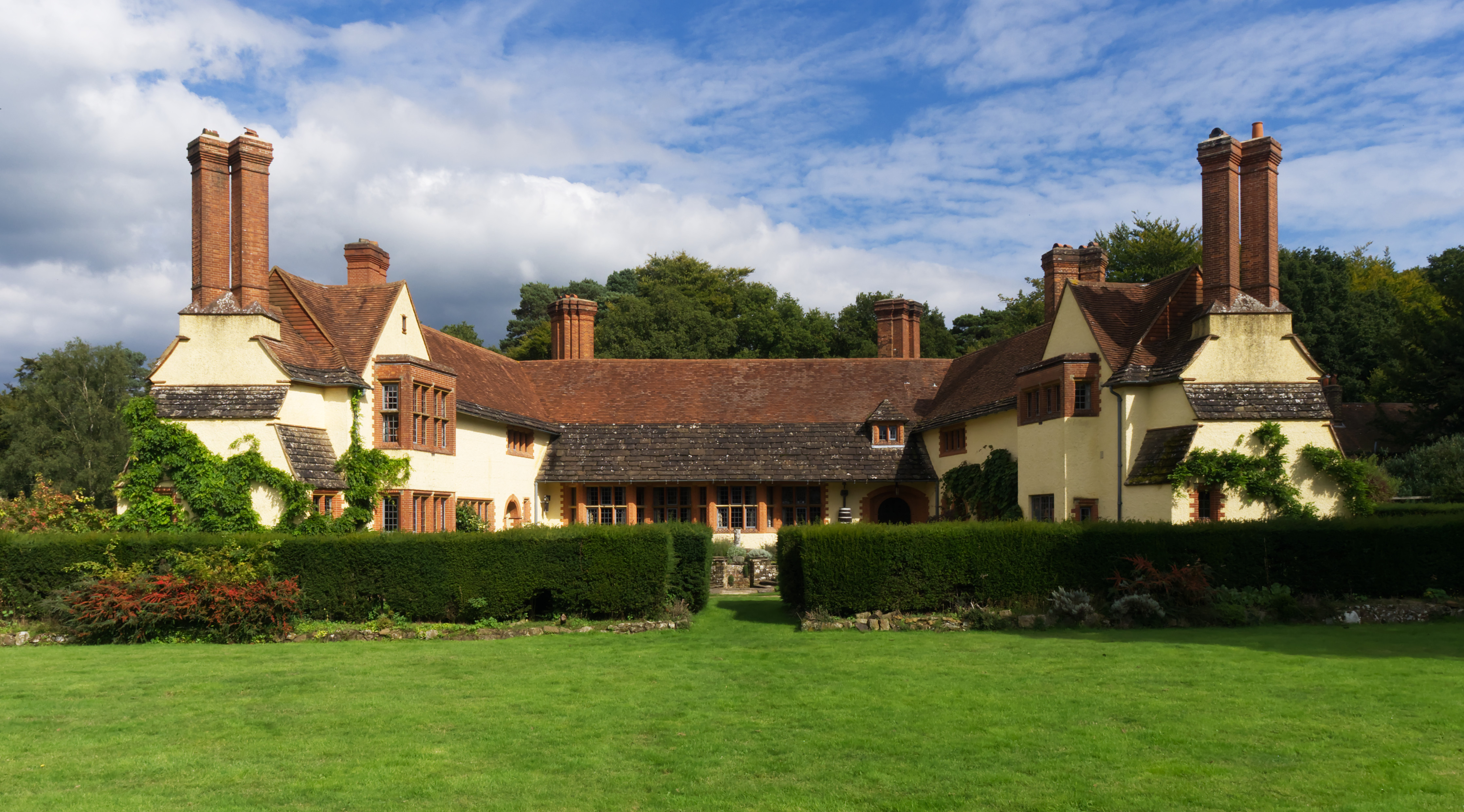
- Goddards from the west

- Location within Surrey
- 51°11′51″N 0°23′57″W
- Type: Country house
- Location: Abinger Common, Surrey

History
- Built: 1899–1900

Site notes
- Elevation: 179 metres (587 ft)
- Architect: Edwin Lutyens
- Architectural style: Arts and Crafts movement
- Governing body: Landmark Trust
- Owner: Lutyens Trust

Listed Building – Grade II*
- Official name: Goddards
- Designated: 7 February 1972
- Reference no.: 1028841

Goddards is a Grade II*-listed house in Abinger Common, Surrey, England, completed in 1900. It was designed by Edwin Lutyens in the ideals of the Arts and Crafts movement and the west-facing courtyard garden was designed by Gertrude Jekyll. The house uses local building materials, including Horsham stone tiles, and the two wings are splayed at an angle towards the late-afternoon sun. The design is influenced by vernacular hall houses and almshouses, as well as the architectural ideas of the late-19th century and the Tudor period.

Originally built for Frederick Mirrielees, whose fortune came from shipping, "as a home of rest to which ladies of small means might repair for holiday", Goddards was configured as two cottages linked by a common room. Original features include the skittle alley, and the exposed timber beams and fireplace in the common room.

In 1910, Lutyens extended the building and adapted it as a private residence for Mirrielees' son and daughter-in-law. The modifications included the provision of two large bedrooms, bathrooms, a library and a dining room. The couple never permanently moved to Goddards and, in 1914, the house was leased to Arthur Gibbs, who purchased it outright in 1925.

Goddards was awarded grade II* listed building status in February 1972. The house was donated to the Lutyens Trust in 1991, which continues to occupy the library. Most of the building has been leased by the Landmark Trust since 1996. A restoration project took place in the 1990s and Goddards is open to visitors by prior arrangement.

== History ==
The land for Goddards was originally part of the Wotton Estate, owned by the Evelyn family. The name is from "Goddards Cottage", which dates from the 17th century and still stands to the south-east of the Lutyens house. The 2.8 ha (10-acre) plot is on Abinger Common in Surrey, northwest of Leith Hill, and is almost 180 m (590 ft) above ordnance datum.

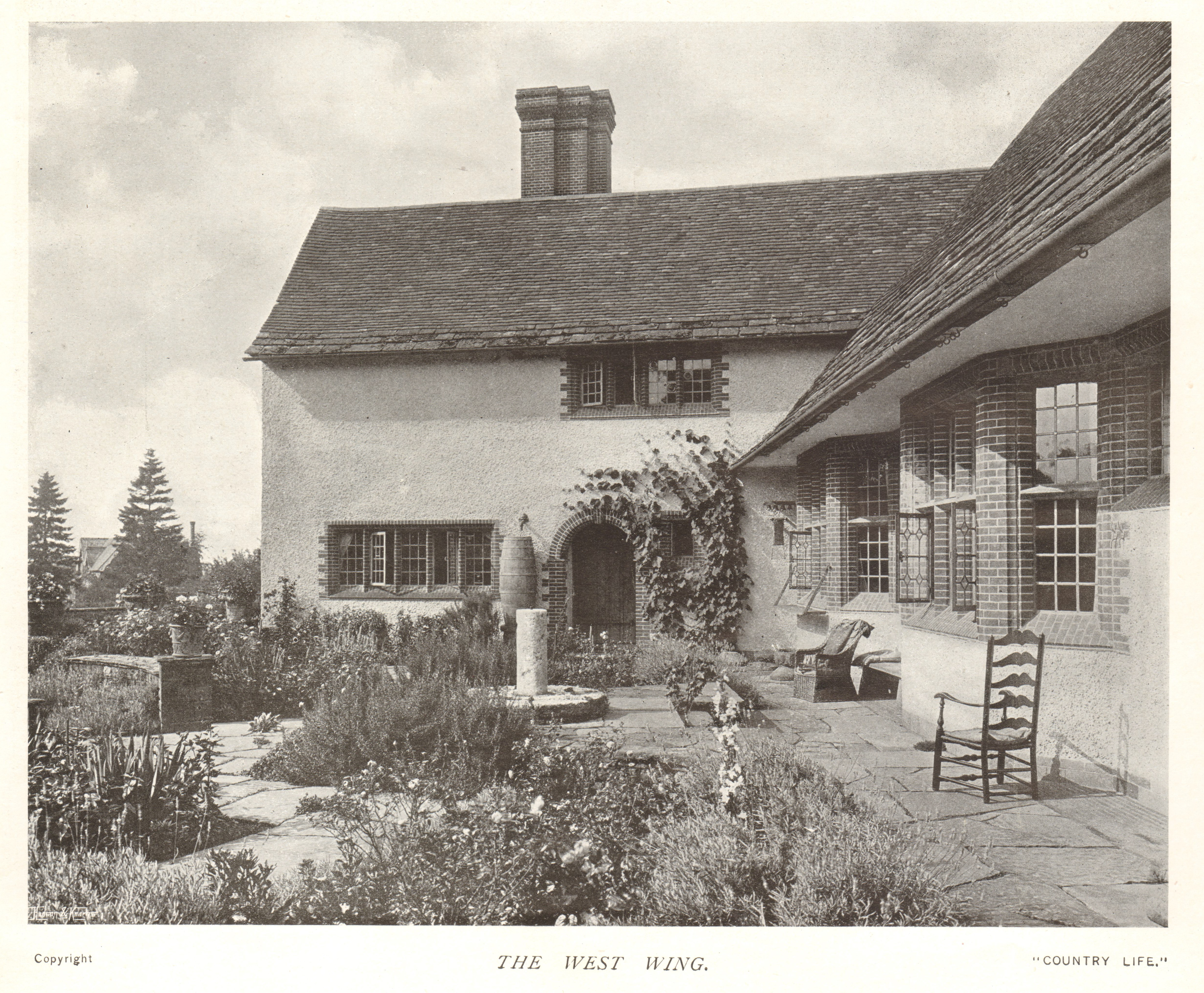
The common room (right) and north wing from the courtyard garden in 1904

In 1898, Frederick Mirrielees, who had made his money in shipping, commissioned Edwin Lutyens to design a "home of rest to which ladies of small means might repair for holiday." Mirrielees specified that the building should consist of two small side cottages linked by a common room. The house was constructed by Harrisons, a local building firm, and was completed in 1900. The majority of the women who stayed at Goddards were single and were employed as nurses or governesses. At Goddards they were able to socialise, read, and enjoy music and games together. The building was also used as a rest home for soldiers injured in the Second Boer War.

In 1910, Mirrielees commissioned Lutyens to convert Goddards into a residence for his son, Donald, and daughter-in-law, Mary Pangbourne. The architect extended the two wings, creating a dining room and a library on the ground floor and two new bedrooms on the first floor. The modifications included partitioning the loft gallery into three bedrooms for domestic servants. A further bedroom was also added in the north wing; central heating and electrical wiring were installed for the first time. Lutyens also erected the timber-framed, 17th century barn, now the house known as "High Barn", which he relocated from Slinfold, West Sussex.

Frederick Mirrielees died in January 1914 and Goddards was leased to Arthur Gibbs, a banker. Mirrielees' widow, Mary, died in 1925 and, two years later, Gibbs purchased the house from her family.

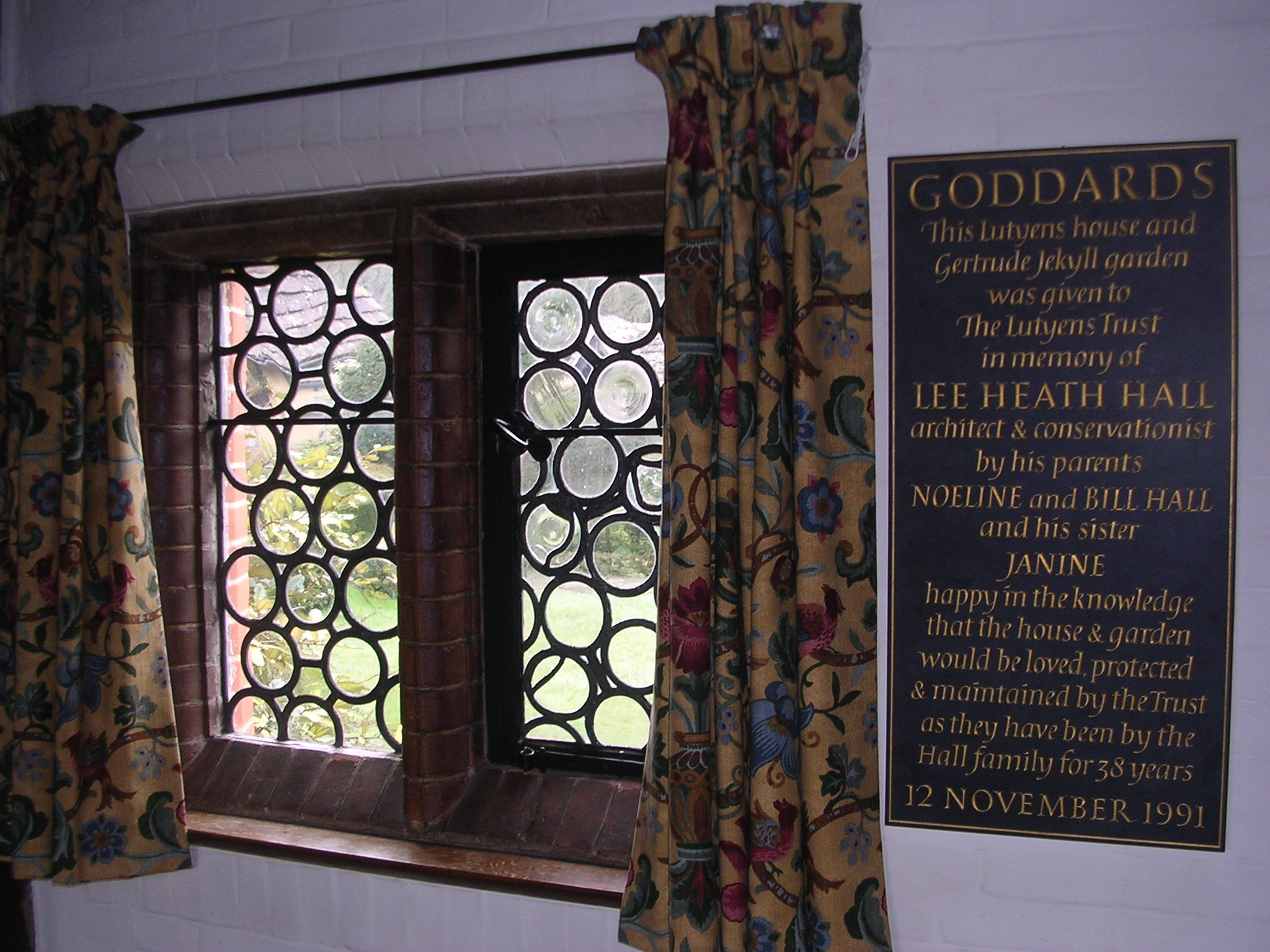
Plaque in the common room marking the donation of Goddards to the Lutyens Trust in memory of Lee Hall

Bill and Noeline Hall bought Goddards in 1953. They were responsible for commissioning the detached garage, designed by Wildblood and Hall in 1981. In the same year, the Halls hosted an exhibition on Lutyens, which helped to revive interest both in the architect's work and in the wider Arts and Crafts movement. Their son Lee, an architect, died in 1988 and the couple donated the house to the Lutyens Trust in 1991 in his memory. The plaque in the common room by Richard Kindersley is also dedicated to him. Goddards was opened to pre-booked visitors in 1991.

The Landmark Trust leased most of the house from the Lutyens Trust in 1996 and began a programme of restoration to return it to its 1910 configuration. The work included the relocation of the kitchen, which had been moved in 1953, and the removal of partitions that had divided some of the rooms into smaller spaces. As part of the same project, the external brickwork and stonework was repaired, including the partial rebuilding of one of the chimneys on the north side of the house. The house was reopened to pre-booked visitors in 1997. Goddards was given Grade II* listed building status in February 1972. The house can be rented as a holiday home for groups of up to 12 people, although the Lutyens Trust continues to occupy the library.

== House ==
Stylistically, the house sits within the ideals of the Arts and Crafts movement and combines Tudor and vernacular influences with contemporary ideas from the end of the 19th century. For Goddards, Lutyens followed the philosophy of one of his early influences, Randolph Caldecott, in creating a traditional country building and he may also have been influenced by the design of local almshouses. The materials used in the building contribute rustic textures and colours. The prominent chimneys are built of brick and the walls are constructed of colour-washed rough-cast stone. The clay tiles of the main roof are plain, but the lower courses are slabs of Horsham Stone, which form a pentice above the canted bay windows.

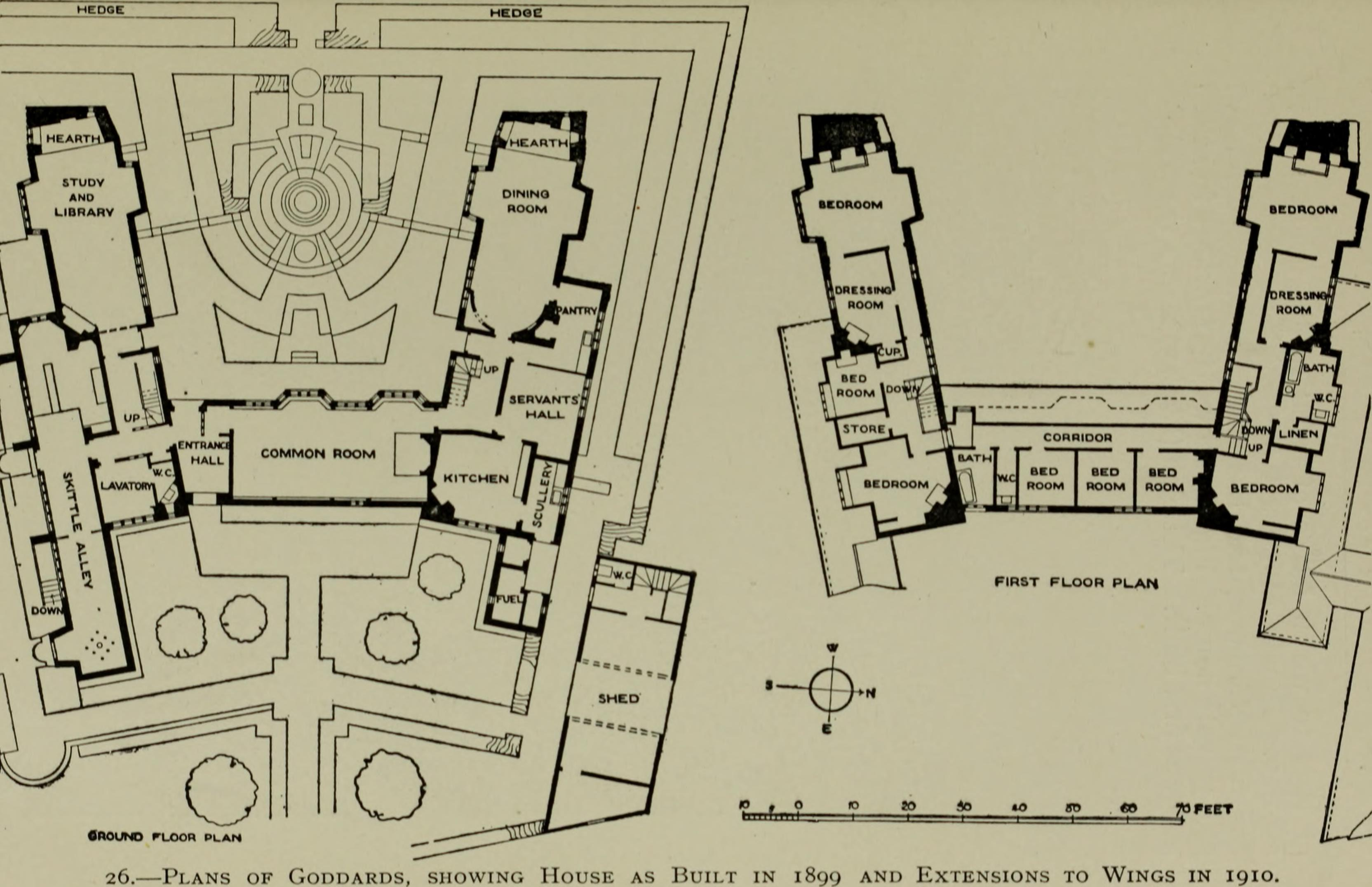
Ground (left) and first floor plans after the 1910 alterations

The house is built around three sides of a courtyard, with splayed wings, likened to a "butterfly", oriented towards the late-afternoon and evening sun. (Note: Chesters in Northumberland is one of the earliest houses in Britain to incorporate splayed wings, which were added in 1891 by Richard Norman Shaw. Lutyens visited Chesters in 1903, after the completion of Goddards, and developed the concept further at Papillon Hall in Leicestershire, which has four wings set at angles of 55° as opposed to the two wings splayed at 78° at Goddards.) Although the general plan is symmetrical, Daniel O'Neill notes: "No sooner did Lutyens set up a symmetrical scheme than he started to break it down in a way seemingly arbitrary, though actually carefully controlled". For example, the entrance from the west-facing courtyard is positioned at the south end of the common room, rather than in the centre, and this imbalance is accentuated by a dormer window above. O'Neill observes that these and similar asymmetric features temper the dominance of the tall, paired chimney stacks.

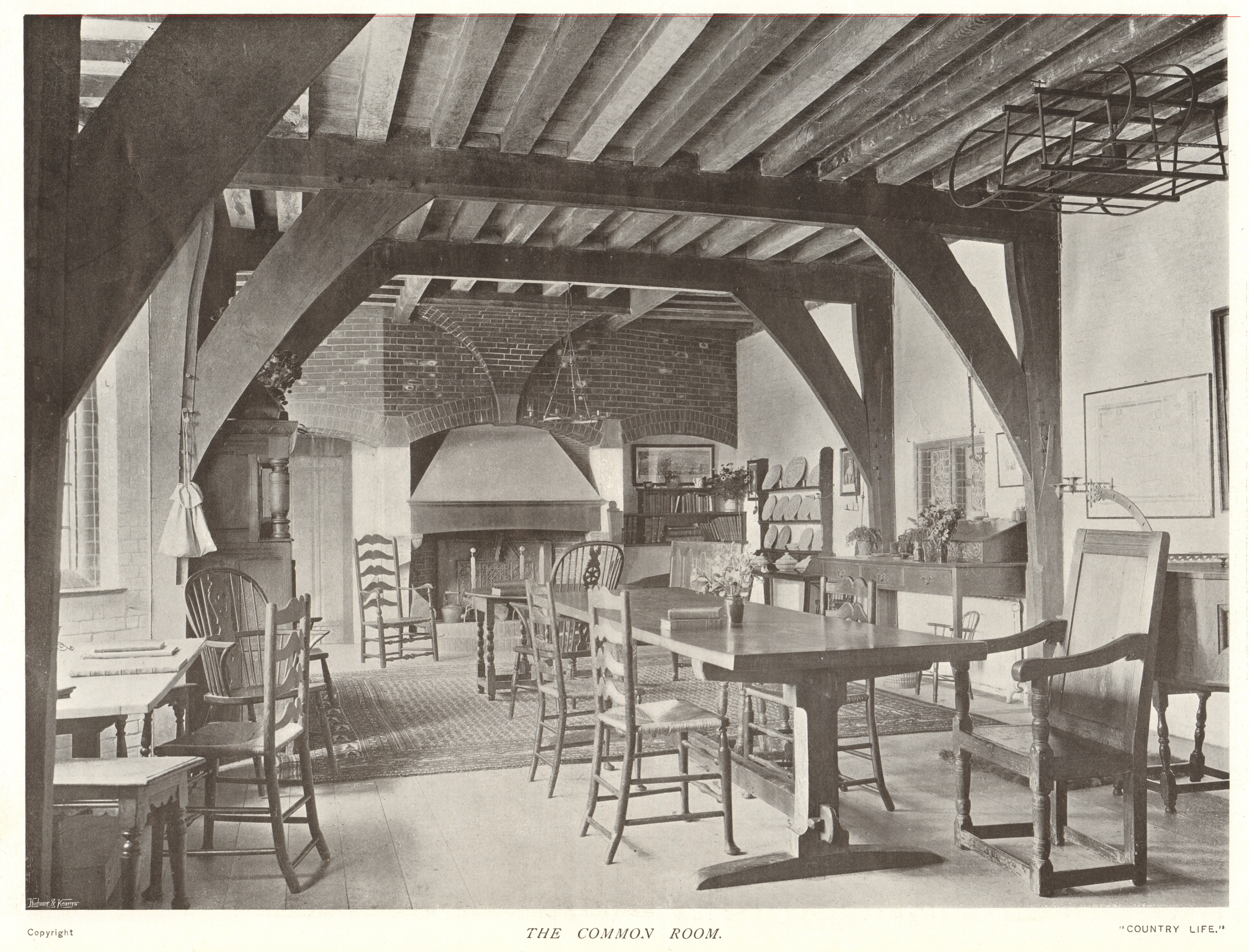
The common room in 1904

Since its original intended use was as a holiday home, the Mirrielees family did not request luxury furnishings. As the writer Dominic Bradbury notes: "The restrained and sometimes utilitarian interiors let the craftsmanship shine through." The historian Jane Ridley notes that the internal features such as the timberwork, larder ventilators and decorative ironmongery were influenced by ideas later expounded in Gertrude Jekyll's book, Old West Surrey, published in 1904. The common room, modelled on an open medieval hall, is typical of this vernacular aesthetic, with exposed timber beams and a large fireplace at one end. When completed in 1900, there were six bedrooms for guests and the loft above the common room was used as a games room.

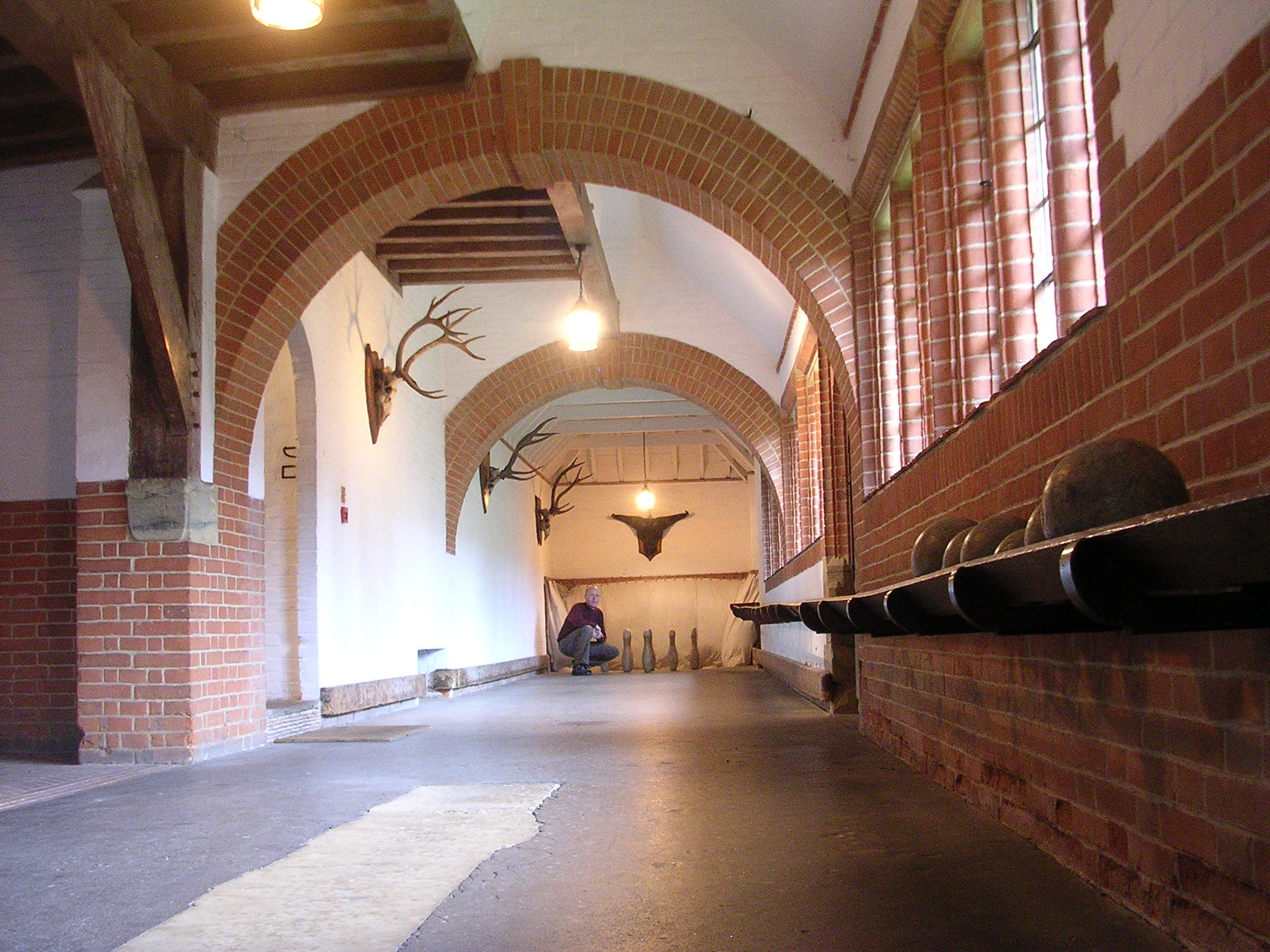
Skittle alley

The skittle alley, in the southeastern corner of the house, is part of the original construction and would have been considered fashionable at the end of the 19th century. The roof of the single-storey arcade is supported by brick arches which lead into the orchard and which, according to Dominic Bradbury, "help to define a functional, yet quietly beautiful space." The carvings on the walls were taken from a demolished manor house in Wandsworth and are dated 1707. The original skittles and balls are still kept at Goddards.

When Goddards was given to Donald and Mary Mirrielees in 1910, it was unsuitable as a country home for a wealthy Edwardian couple. In particular, it lacked a master bedroom and bathrooms, and there were no suitable spaces for hosting parties. By extending the two wings to the west, two new bedrooms could be provided on the first floor, each with a reception room below. The library and dining room, on the ground floor, are each dominated by an ingle-nook fireplace, and the latter room has wooden panelling. The dining room incorporates decorative features in the styles of the 16th and 18th centuries, which give the false impression that the room has been developed and modified over a long period of time. (Note: The Georgian-style features in the dining room are based on those at Temple Dinsley in Hertfordshire and Heathcote in West Yorkshire.) The fireplaces in the two well-lit bedrooms incorporate a decorative hexagonal keystone and are flanked by built-in wardrobes. The architectural historian Brian Edwards suggests that the 1910 additions may not have been completely successful and notes that Donald and Mary Mirrielees never permanently moved to Goddards, only using the house to host weekend parties. He further comments: "What is remarkable today is the extent to which the original character of Goddards survived… Perhaps [Lutyens] was too reticent in his conversion… satisfying neither the taste for luxury nor romance…"

The majority of the oil paintings at Goddards are by Lutyens's father, Charles Augustus Lutyens (1829–1917), and have been lent by his family to the Landmark Trust. Several of the watercolours are by Ethel Hall. In the library is a likeness of Edwin Lutyens by Meredith Frampton, which is an engraving of the portrait in the Art Workers' Guild. In the sitting room is a portrait of Noeline Hall by Will Longstaff. The date-stone above the front door bears the letters "MCM", which represent the year of completion of the house (1900) in Roman numerals and also the initials of the Mirrielees' daughter, Margaret Celia Mirrielees. The organ pipes carved into the stone are a pun on the family surname "Mirrielees – merry lees".

== Gardens ==
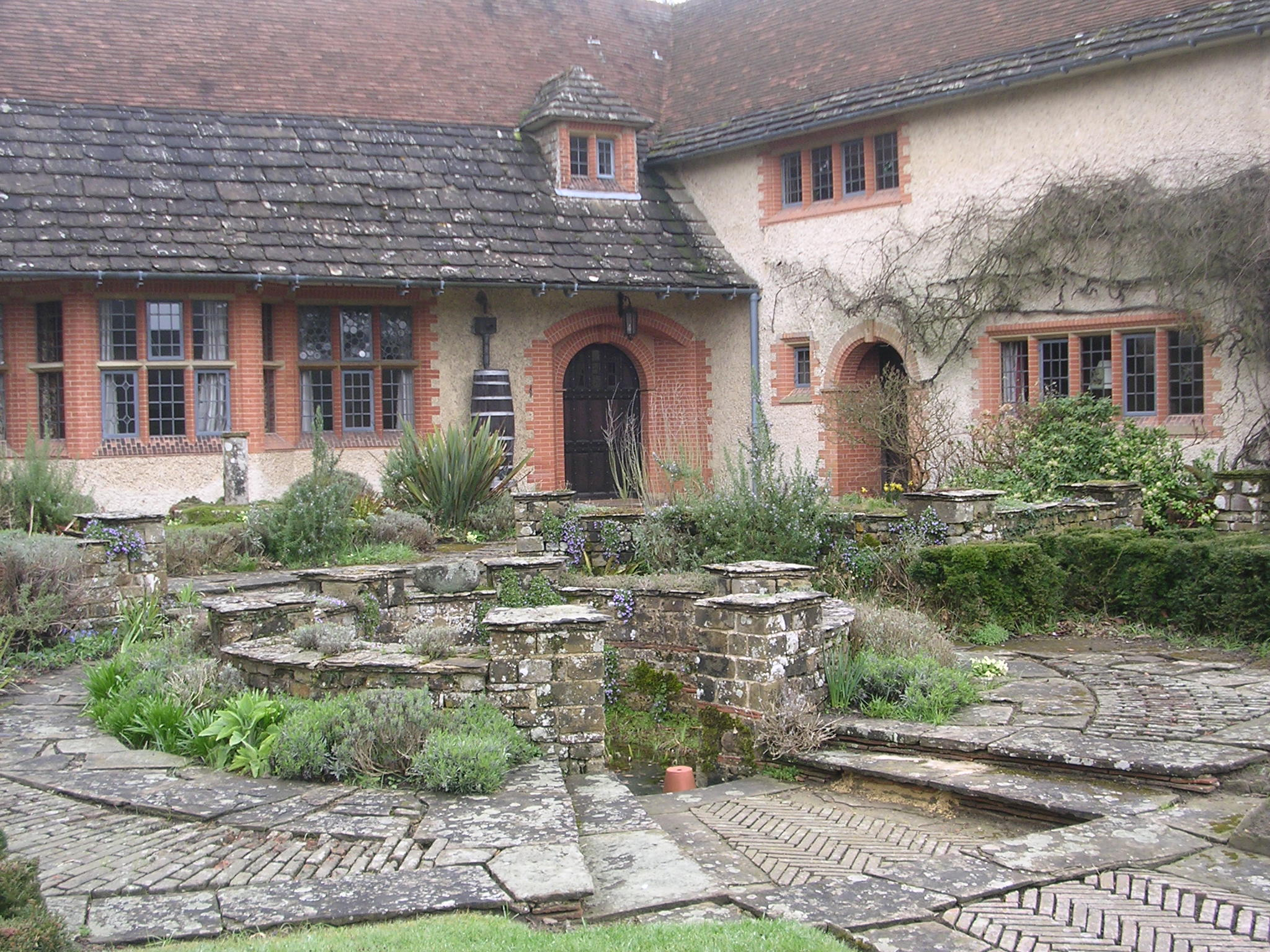
Courtyard garden with central well pond

The west-facing courtyard garden sits between the two wings of the house and is overlooked by all the major rooms. Designed by Gertrude Jekyll, it was intended to be low-maintenance and lacks the large herbaceous borders and pergola structures typical of her work. The focal point is a well pond in the centre, surrounded by silvery-grey foliage that adds structure to the space. A vine planted by Jekyll in 1900 survives in 2024. Judith Tankard suggests that the courtyard garden was inspired by the paved north court at Munstead Wood, which Jekyll and Lutyens had designed two years before starting work on Goddards, and considers that the "curiously shaped paving stones… give the space an architectural character."

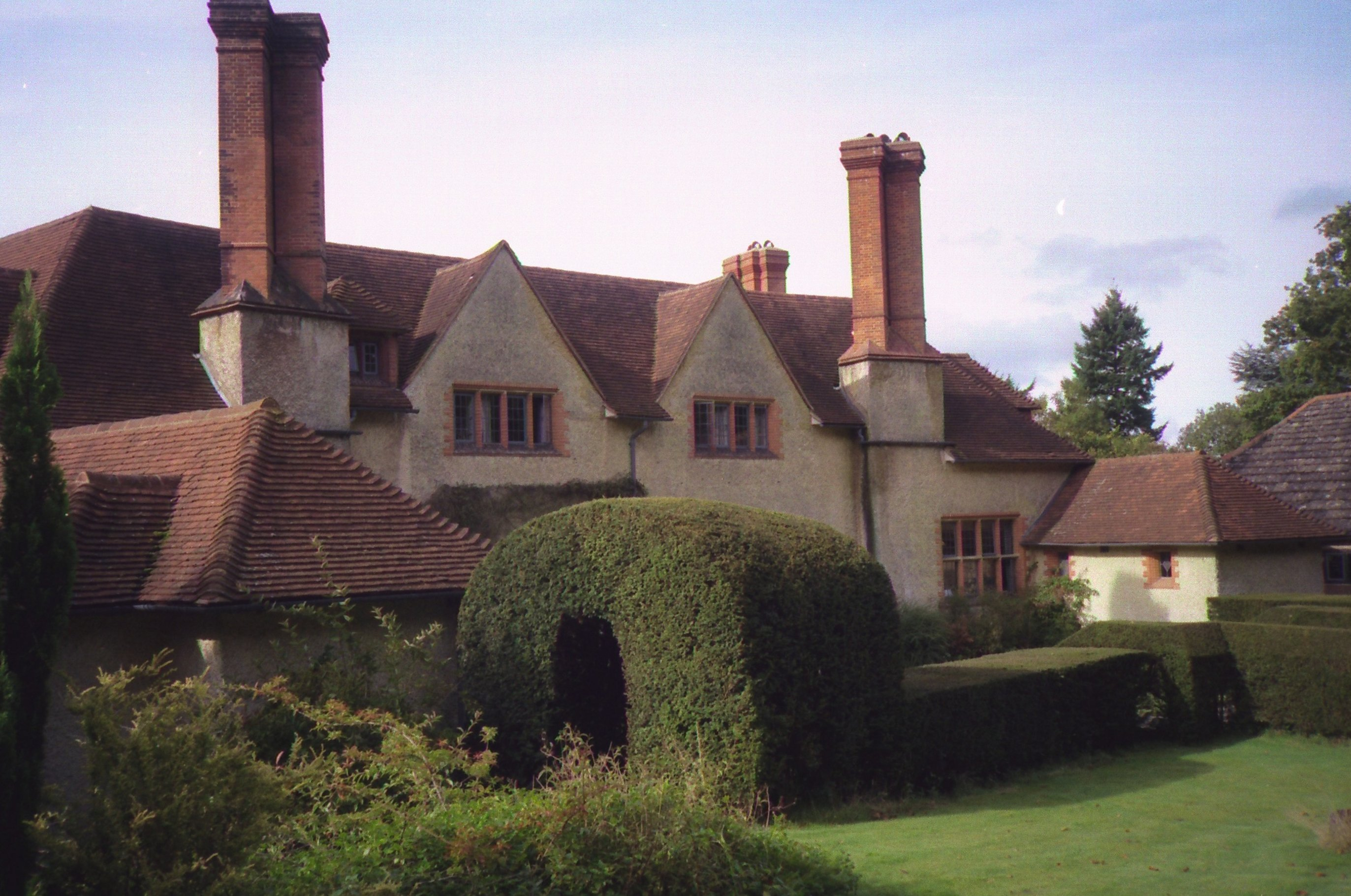
The east garden, looking northwest

The east garden is screened from the road by a boundary hedge containing beech, elm, hawthorn and holly, thought to pre-date the house. The original yew hedges, planted in 1898, are still in place. The outer garden is defined by shrubbery on the north side, a ha-ha to the west and the present car park to the south.

Millstones are set into the paving in all three garden areas. The largest, in the east garden, is 1.5 m (60 in) in diameter and is thought to have come from a bark-grinding mill at Godalming. The smallest stones, in the west courtyard, are 60 cm (23.5 in) in diameter and may have formed part of a hand-powered mill. Most of the stones are thought to have originated from quarries in Derbyshire, although five are thought to be burrstones from France.

== Critical responses ==
In his 2005 book, English Gardens in the Twentieth century, Tim Richardson writes: "Orchards and Goddards, particularly, seem to suggest both grandeur and humility at the same time – the Holy Grail for the English sensibility." In his 2009 book, The Iconic House, Dominic Bradbury says of Goddards: "the nature of its use led to the supremacy of an almost Shaker-like simplicity within, rather than the atmosphere of Lutyens's great country houses." He further comments: "This intriguing combination of old and new – within a house that has a foot in both past and future – makes Goddards so fresh and powerful."

In Landmark: A History of Britain in 50 Buildings, published in 2015, the architectural historian Anna Keay writes: "Goddards embodied the Arts and Crafts ideal of an honest, unpretentious home." The writer Alan Powers considers the building to be one of three houses that exemplify the Arts and Crafts movement: "Goddards… is a good representative of the period… when [Lutyens] came closest to the Modernist idea."

Others have been more critical. In The domestic architecture of Sir Edwin Lutyens, originally published in 1950, A.S.G. Butler, George Stewart and Christopher Hussey point to the sheer number of different building materials used at Goddards: "…roughcast, moulded brick, stone, Horsham slates and ordinary roofing-tiles are too rich an agglomeration in so small an area. It suggests a little that the architect wanted to display his great knowledge of all of them." The critic Ian Nairn echoes this point, noting that Goddards has "a promising asymmetrical style ruined by slack elevations and a remarkably unhappy choice of materials..." In a similar vein, Daniel O'Neill writes: "The feeling is of congested display and pictorial gymnastics for its own sake. There is so often this conflict in Lutyens's early work – where admiration for his inventive ideas and the rigour of carrying them out are at odds with exasperation at their ostentation."

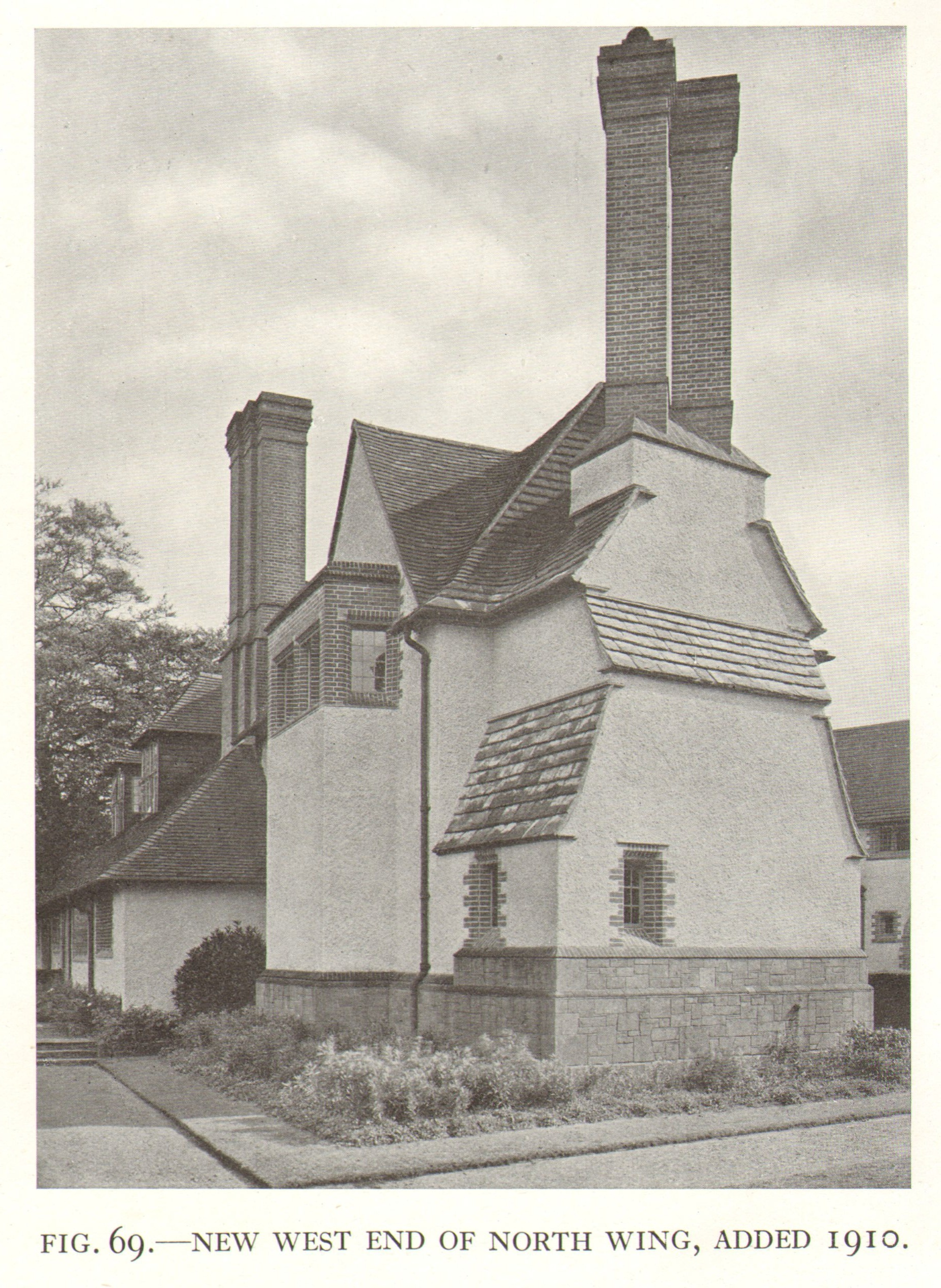
The 1910 extension to the west end of the north wing

O'Neill is also critical of the wing extensions added during the 1910 remodelling: "One cannot help thinking that Lutyens was trying too hard for sculptural effect in the build-up of small roof sections." In contrast, the architectural historian Gavin Stamp writes: "These new end wings are superb examples of Lutyens's handling of form, with wall planes stepped back by slated slopes... – a system of sculpting mass similar to that employed on the Cenotaph a decade later." Brian Edwards writes: "Much of the beauty of these buildings derives from their odd, sometimes disturbing proportion. Goddards is not an essay in mathematical proportion, but proportion engineered by the eye of an artist."

== See also ==
- Abinger Common War Memorial, also designed by Lutyens in the same village
- Grade II* listed buildings in Mole Valley

== Bibliography ==
- Bradbury, Dominic (2009). The Iconic house. London: Thames & Hudson. ISBN 978-0-50-034255-8.
- Butler, A.S.G.; Stewart, George; Hussey, Christopher (1989) [1950]. The Domestic Architecture of Sir Edwin Lutyens. Woodbridge: Country Life. ISBN 978-1-85-149100-1.
- Edwards, Brian (1996). Goddards: Sir Edwin Lutyens. London: Phaidon. ISBN 978-0-71-483263-0.
- Holder, Julian (2021). Arts and Crafts architecture : 'Beauty's Awakening'. Marlborough: The Crownwood Press Ltd. ISBN 978-1-78-500796-5.
- Hussey, Christopher (1984). The Life of Sir Edwin Lutyens. Melton: ACC Art Books. ISBN 978-0-90-746259-0.
- Keay, Anna; Stanford, Caroline (2015). Landmark : A History of Britain in 50 Buildings. London: Frances Lincoln Ltd. ISBN 978-0-71-123645-5.
- Nairn, Ian; Pevsner, Ian; Cherry, Bridget (1971) [1962]. Surrey. The Buildings of England. London: Yale University Press. ISBN 978-0-30-009675-0.
- O'Brien, Charles; Nairn, Ian; Cherry, Bridget (2022) [1962]. Pevsner, Nikolaus (ed.). Surrey. The Buildings of England. London: Yale University Press. ISBN 978-0-30-023478-7.
- O'Neill, Daniel (1980). Lutyens : Country Houses. London: Lund Humphries Publishers Ltd. ISBN 978-0-82-307361-0.
- Percy, Clayre (2011) [2009]. Goddards History Album (PDF). Maidenhead: Landmark Trust.
- Powers, Alan (2005). Modern : The Modern Movement in Britain. London: Merrell. ISBN 978-1-85-894255-1.
- Richardson, Tim (2005). English Gardens in the Twentieth Century. London: Aurum Press. ISBN 978-1-84-513071-8.
- Ridley, Jane (2002). The Architect and his Wife: A Life of Edwin Lutyens. London: Chatto & Windus. ISBN 978-0-70-117201-5.
- Roberts, Niall (1995). "Lutyens's and Jekyll's Garden Millstones". In Breckels, Duncan (ed.). Proceedings of the Twelfth Mill Research Conference. Ivinghoe: Mills Research Group. ISBN 978-0-95-097587-0.
- Stamp, Gavin (2001). Edwin Lutyens : Country Houses. London: Aurum Press. ISBN 978-1-85-410763-3.
- Tankard, Judith B. (2004). Gardens of the Arts and Crafts Movement. New York: Harry N. Abrams. ISBN 978-0-81-094965-2.
- Tankard, Judith B. (2011). Gertrude Jekyll and the Country House Garden. London: Aurum Press. ISBN 978-1-84-513624-6.
- Weaver, Lawrence (1987) [1913]. Houses and Gardens by E.L. Lutyens. Woodbridge: Antique Collectors' Club. ISBN 978-0-90-202898-2.
