= Milton Court =

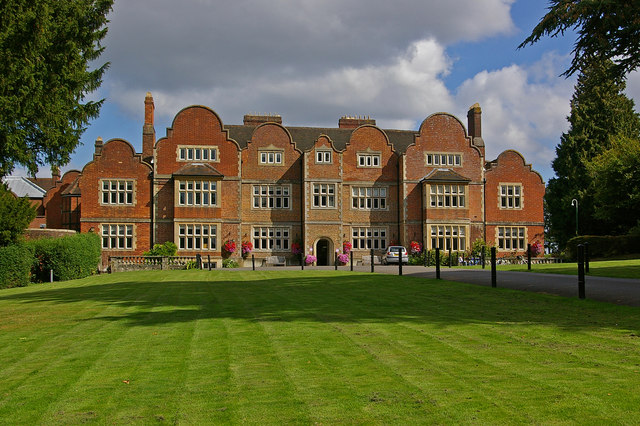
- View of the front of Milton Court

- Location within Surrey
- 51°13′54″N 0°21′08″W
- Type: Country house
- Location: Dorking, Surrey

History
- Built: 1611 to 20th century

Site notes
- Architect: William Burges (expansion)
- Architectural style: vernacular
- Owner: Unum Group

Listed Building – Grade II*
- Designated: 11 June 1973
- Reference no.: 1230137

Milton Court, at the far west of the town of Dorking, is a 17th-century country house in Surrey. The court was expanded and substantially rebuilt by the Victorian architect William Burges and is a Grade II* listed building. The listing includes the attached forecourt walls, balustrading, terrace, piers, urns and stone-carved ball finial.

Originally a priory, the estate was granted to George Evelyn, father of the diarist John Evelyn at the Protestant Reformation. George Evelyn was lord of the adjoining manor of Wotton, Surrey where the family had established themselves at Wotton House. In the nineteenth century, the court was bought by Lachlan Mackintosh Rate, a wealthy lawyer, banker and philanthropist. He employed William Burges to undertake substantial rebuilding. Working in an ornate Jacobean style, Burges added twenty rooms, with elaborate fireplaces and ceilings. Perhaps the most successful is the famed Flower room, formerly Mrs Rate's boudoir. Nikolaus Pevsner describes it as "a picturesque seven-bay house with shaped gables".

The house is now the UK headquarters of the health insurance company Unum, which has worked to restore the house and its interior decoration.
