= Abinger =

Civil parish in Mole Valley, Surrey, England

Coordinates: 51.20°N 0.41°W

- Civil parish
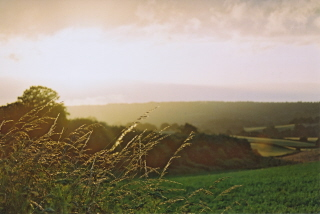
- Looking across arable land from Abinger Common towards Abinger Hammer

- Location within Surrey
- Area: 30.17 km^{2} (11.65 sq mi)
- Population: 1,911 (in 2021)
  - Density: 63/km^{2} (160/sq mi)
- OS grid reference: TQ1146
- Civil parish: Abinger
- District: Mole Valley
- Shire county: Surrey
- Region: South East
- Country: England
- Sovereign state: United Kingdom
- Post town: Dorking
- Postcode district: RH5
- Dialling code: 01306
- Police: Surrey
- Fire: Surrey
- Ambulance: South East Coast
- UK Parliament: Dorking and Horley
- Website: Parish Council

Abinger is a large, well-wooded and mostly rural civil parish that lies between the settlements of Dorking, Shere and Ewhurst in the Mole Valley district of Surrey, England.

The parish lies west of Leith Hill. Its settlements include Abinger Hammer, Sutton Abinger, Abinger Common, Forest Green, Walliswood, Okewood Hill (or Oakwoodhill) and some outskirts of Holmbury St Mary. The parish population at the 2021 census was 1,911. More than half of the parish lies on the Greensand Ridge, while the remainder is divided between the Vale of Holmesdale and the North Downs.

== Geography ==
Abinger, including the dependent villages of Forest Green and Walliswood, ranks third in size in Surrey after Farnham and Cranleigh. Its list of localities is as set out in the introduction and make up what is called a strip parish reaching from the North Downs to the border of West Sussex, the only parish in Surrey to do so. The entire area is in the Surrey Hills AONB.

=== Streams and forest ===
The upper reach of the Tilling Bourne runs through Abinger Hammer from east to west and is joined by the Holmbury St Mary stream on the western border. In the southwest by Sutton Abinger are Pasture Wood and Oxmoor Copse, lower forested slopes of the Greensand Ridge, projections from the Winterfold/Hurt Wood forest.

=== Hills ===
Southeast the land approaches the highest point in the Greensand Ridge, climbing through Abinger Common, more than halfway up Leith Hill, reaching in the south-east corner of the parish an elevation of 248 m (814 ft) above sea level. Similarly to the north the parish reaches the top of the North Downs in the protruding arm of Mole Valley, across Abinger Roughs including the highest point before the northern boundary, in Oaken Grove, at Dunley Hill 227 m (745 ft) above sea level; the parish here has the 11th highest hill in Surrey along part of the fluctuating North Downs scarp. The lowest point is where the Tilling Bourne flows into Gomshall at 85 m (279 ft).

== Transport ==
Abinger Hammer lies on the A25 Guildford to Dorking road, while the remainder of the area is served by more minor roads.

The nearest railway station is to the west at Gomshall on the North Downs Line from Reading to Gatwick Airport.

== History ==
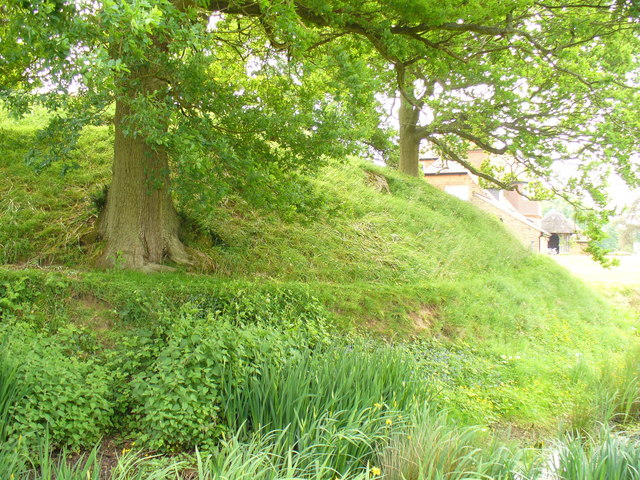
Abinger Manor Motte

A Mesolithic burial site on the southeast of Abinger Common is testament to the long time for which the area has been inhabited. There is also evidence of strip farming. Remains of a Romano-British villa, a Scheduled Ancient Monument, lie approximately 120 m east of Abinger Hall stables.

Abinger is recorded in the Domesday Book of 1086 as Abinceborne held by William son of Ansculf. It was assessed for tax at 6 hides in 1066 and 4 hides by 1086. There was land for 9 plough teams with 2 plough teams working the lord's land. There were 10 villagers and 7 smallholders with a further 5 plough teams. There was a church and 5 slaves, 1 mill worth 6 s, 3 acres of meadow; and from woodland and pasture the manor rendered 40 pigs. The total value in 1066 was £8, and when acquired by William son of Ansculf and in 1086 was £7.

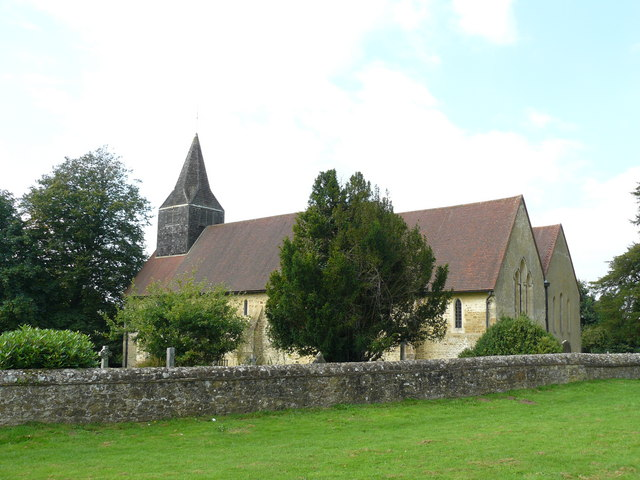
St James's Church, Abinger Common

The church of the Abingers is the C of E church of St James at Abinger Common, which is a II* class listed building whose nave is 11th century, chancel and north chapel built 1220 CE, reconstructed in 1857, damaged by a V1 flying bomb in 1944, and restored 1950 by Frederick Etchells. The headquarters of the Lutyens Trust is based in the village at Goddards (designed by Sir Edwin Lutyens). Lutyens also designed Abinger Common War Memorial. Opposite the church is the 19th century Evelyn Hall which has recently been completely refurbished and can be hired for events. To the west of the village is Oxmoor Copse which is an Area of Outstanding Natural Beauty.

The church of St John the Baptist in Walliswood also has class II* listed building status.

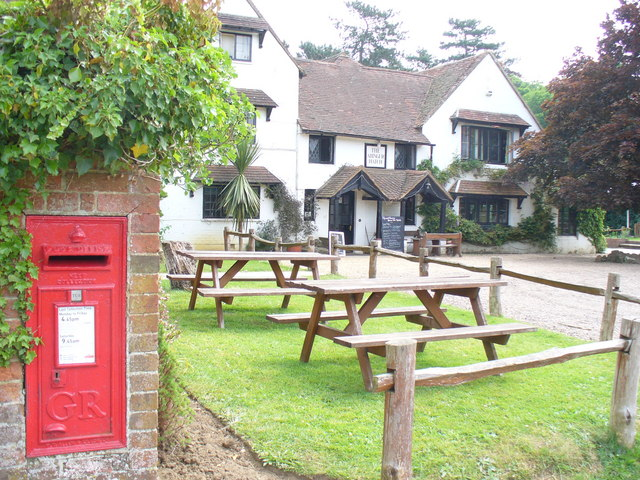
The Abinger Hatch

Sutton Abinger has a pub called The Volunteer and 0.5 miles (0.80 km) east in Abinger Common is the Scheduled Ancient Monument Motte "Castle" at Abinger Manor, the grade II listed manor itself and opposite St James Church are three-person stocks and a public house, the Abinger Hatch, which dates from the 17th century, timber framed, clad in whitewashed brick with whitewashed render and with a green picnic area.

Abinger Hammer contains two grade II* listed buildings, Paddington farmhouse, which is 15th century, listed as possibly earlier, extended in the 16th century, which is also whitewashed; and Crossways farmhouse built 1610, clad in sandstone blocks with brick dressings with a panelled 17th-century door. Crossways is the setting for George Meredith's 1885 novel, Diana of the Crossways.

Fulvens House, which also lies between the Abingers, is actually over the western border and it may date back to 1628.

== Demographics, economy and housing ==
In 2001, Abinger had a population of 1,858 in 717 households. Abinger covers an area of 30.17 square kilometres (11.65 sq mi). Of the population 12.2% were aged over 65; 3.8% of the population were in full-time further education; 85.1% of all men were economically active whereas 2.8% were unemployed, 6.1% worked part-time; 60% of all women were economically active whereas 2.7% were unemployed, 34.6% worked part-time.

As to ethnicity, 99.94% of the population identified themselves as being white, 6 residents identified with one of the other main categories.

In terms of religion, 77.7%% of the population responded as being Christian, 0% as Muslim, 0.8% other religions, 13.7% as atheist and 8.2% declined to answer.

Abinger's economy is predominantly one in the service sector reflected by a low concentration at one end of the official categorisation table of occupation stated, compiled from the 2001 census:

Category	Number of adults in category in 2001	Percentage of those aged 16–74
Lower supervisory and technical occupations	79	5.9%
Semi-routine occupations	99	7.4%
Routine occupations	71	5.3%

Whereas 25.5% of the population worked in lower managerial and professional occupations and 9.2% in higher professional occupations.

=== Housing and home ownership ===
2011 Census Homes
Output area	Detached	Semi-detached	Terraced	Flats and apartments	Caravans/temporary/mobile homes	shared between households
(Civil Parish)	399	246	39	51	2	2

The average level of accommodation in the region composed of detached houses was 28%, the average that was apartments was 22.6%.

2011 Census Key Statistics
Output area	Population	Households	% Owned outright	% Owned with a loan	hectares
(Civil Parish)	1,905	739	37.1%	34.2%	3017

The proportion of households in the civil parish who owned their home outright compares to the regional average of 35.1%. The proportion who owned their home with a loan compares to the regional average of 32.5%. The remaining % is made up of rented dwellings (plus a negligible % of households living rent-free).

== Education ==
Abinger Common First School merged with Westcott School in 2010 to become a two-site all-through primary school.

== Sport and amenities ==
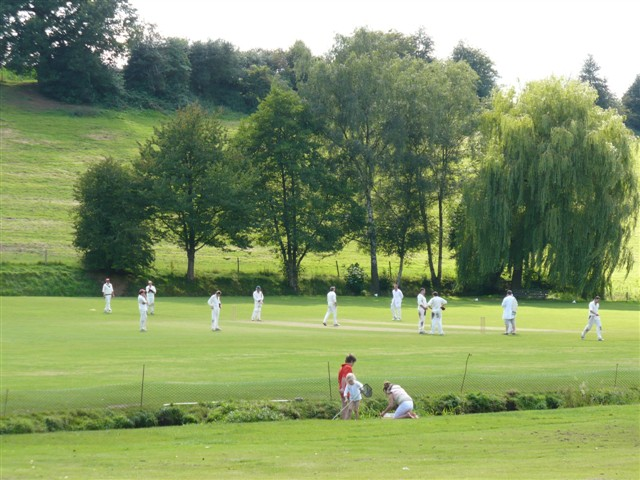
Cricket at Abinger Hammer

Cricket is played across the parish, with a notable team at Abinger Hammer.

There are three village halls with activities and events and three playgrounds across the parish.

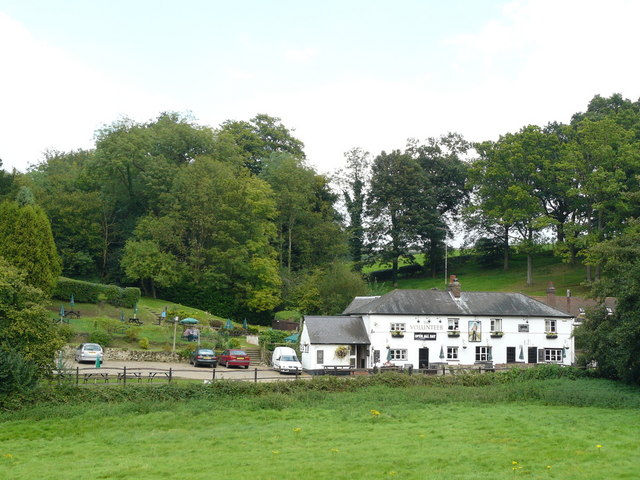
The Volunteer pub

Other than the public houses listed above, there is also the Abinger Arms (see Baron Abinger in Abinger Hammer) and the Scarlett Arms in Walliswood.

== Notable residents ==
- Baron Abinger
- The novelist E. M. Forster lived at West Hackhurst, Abinger Hammer, 1925–1945
- The actress Prunella Scales, known for playing Sybil Fawlty, was born in Sutton Abinger in 1932
- Arthur Brooke, the Brooke Bond tea founder, lived in Abinger Common

== See also ==
- List of places of worship in Mole Valley
