= Busbridge War Memorial =

War memorial in Busbridge, Surrey, England

- United Kingdom
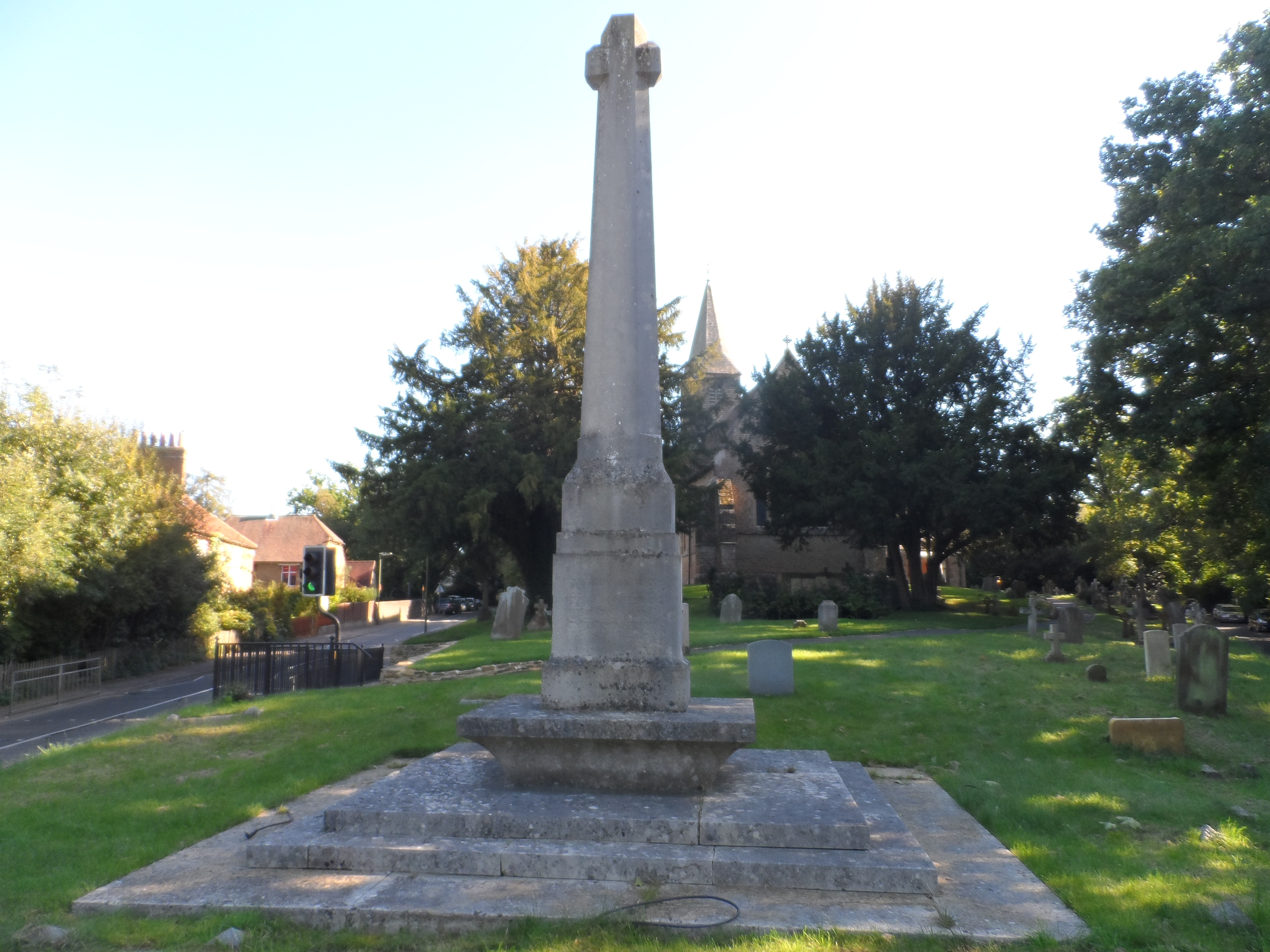
- For men from Busbridge killed in the First World War
- Unveiled: 23 July 1922
- Location: 51°10′39″N 0°36′08″W; St John's Church, Brighton Road, Busbridge, Surrey
- Designed by: Sir Edwin Lutyens

Listed Building – Grade II*
- Official name: Busbridge War Memorial
- Designated: 1 February 1991
- Reference no.: 1044531

Busbridge War Memorial is a First World War memorial in the churchyard of St John's Church in the village of Busbridge (now part of the parish of Godalming), Surrey, in south-eastern England. It was designed by Sir Edwin Lutyens and unveiled in 1922. It is one of several structures in the area for which Lutyens was responsible. His connection with Busbridge began in the 1880s when he partnered with Gertrude Jekyll, a local artist and gardener who lived at nearby Munstead Wood; the relationship led to many more commissions for Lutyens for country houses. Lutyens became renowned for his war memorial work after designing the Cenotaph in London, which he named after a garden seat at Munstead Wood. Busbridge is one of several war memorials he designed in connection with his pre-war work.

The memorial is one of 15 crosses Lutyens designed, mostly for small villages. It consists of a 7-metre-tall (23-foot) tapering shaft with short arms moulded to it near the top. It stands at the end of a triangular churchyard, at the junction of two roads, making it a prominent landmark. No names are inscribed on the memorial; they are instead recorded inside the church, which also has stained-glass windows to commemorate the war. The cross was unveiled by General Sir Charles Monro, the colonel of the local regiment, on 23 July 1922, in front of a large crowd. Lutyens went on to design two monuments in the same churchyard to members of the extended Jekyll family. The war memorial became a listed building in 1991 and was upgraded to Grade II* in 2015 when Historic England declared Lutyens's war memorials a national collection.

== Background ==
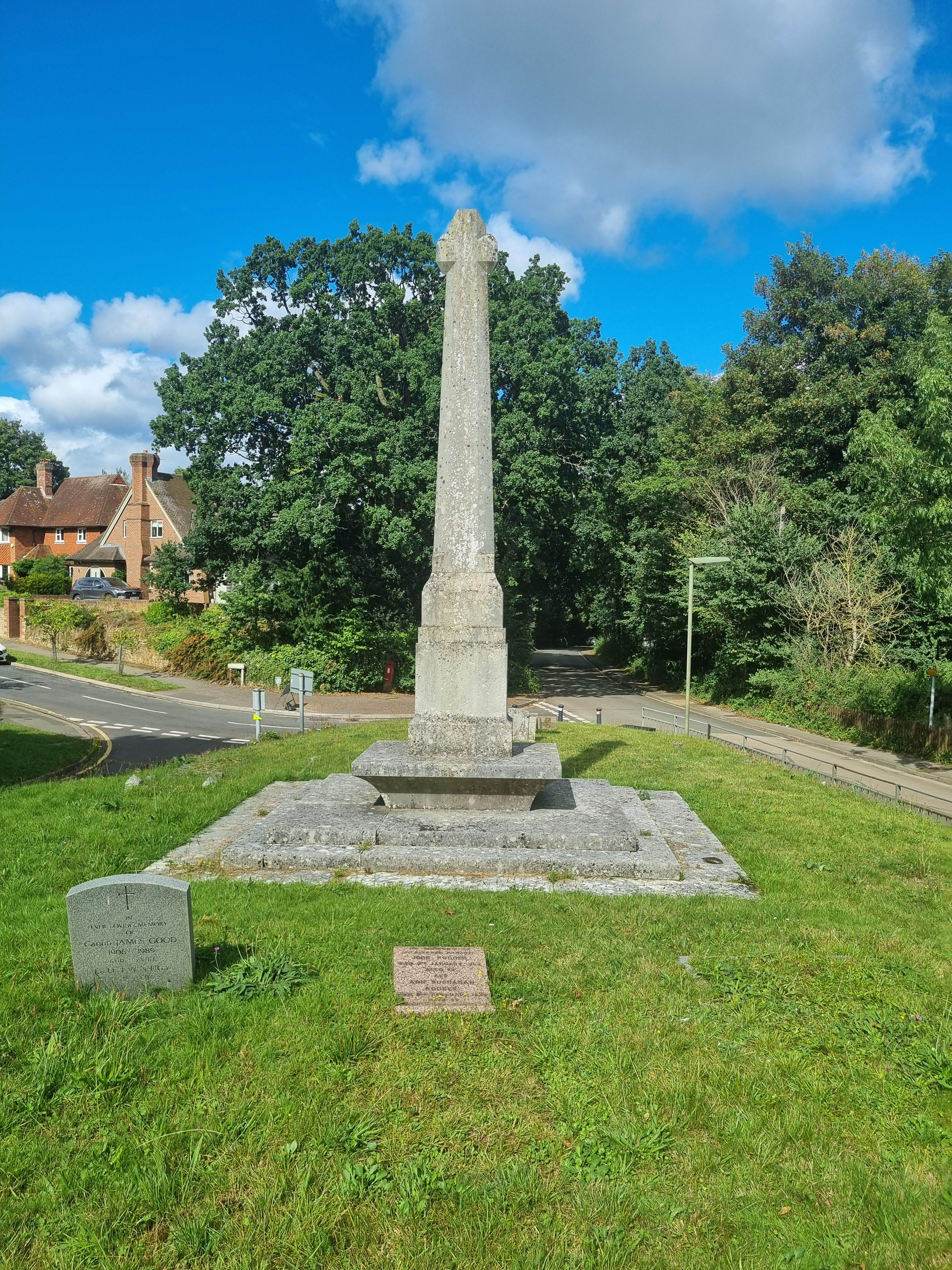
The rear of the war memorial and the road junction

In the aftermath of the First World War (1914–1918) and its unprecedented casualties, thousands of war memorials were built across Britain. Amongst the most prominent designers of memorials was the architect Sir Edwin Lutyens, described by Historic England as "the leading English architect of his generation". Lutyens built his early reputation on designing country houses, including several in Surrey. The war had a profound effect on him and he spent much of his time from 1917 onwards on memorialising its casualties.

Busbridge is a small village just to the south of Godalming in West Surrey, in an area that was used for extensive military camps during the war. Lutyens's association with the village originated through Gertrude Jekyll, a garden designer and artist. Jekyll bought Munstead Wood in the early 1880s and began building a garden. In 1889, she commissioned Lutyens—then in the early stages of his career—to design a house on the property to complement her garden. The two formed a friendship and working partnership which led to multiple commissions over the next two decades. In 1895, Lutyens designed a tombstone for Jekyll's mother, his first venture into commemorative architecture. The monument stands in the graveyard of St John's Church in Busbridge—the same churchyard as the war memorial. Inside the church is a chancel screen, also by Lutyens.

The war memorial in Busbridge is one of several by Lutyens that originated from his pre-war work or from the extended Jekyll family and their friends. Others include Wargrave War Memorial in Berkshire, near the Jekylls' ancestral home, and Mells War Memorial in Somerset, a village where Jekyll's sister-in-law commissioned multiple works from Lutyens. Lutyens was chosen to design Britain's national memorial to the war, which he named The Cenotaph—a term he first heard at Munstead Wood when a friend of Jekyll's named her garden seat the "Cenotaph of Sigismunda". London's Cenotaph led to commissions for war memorials across England and in several Imperial cities.

== Design ==
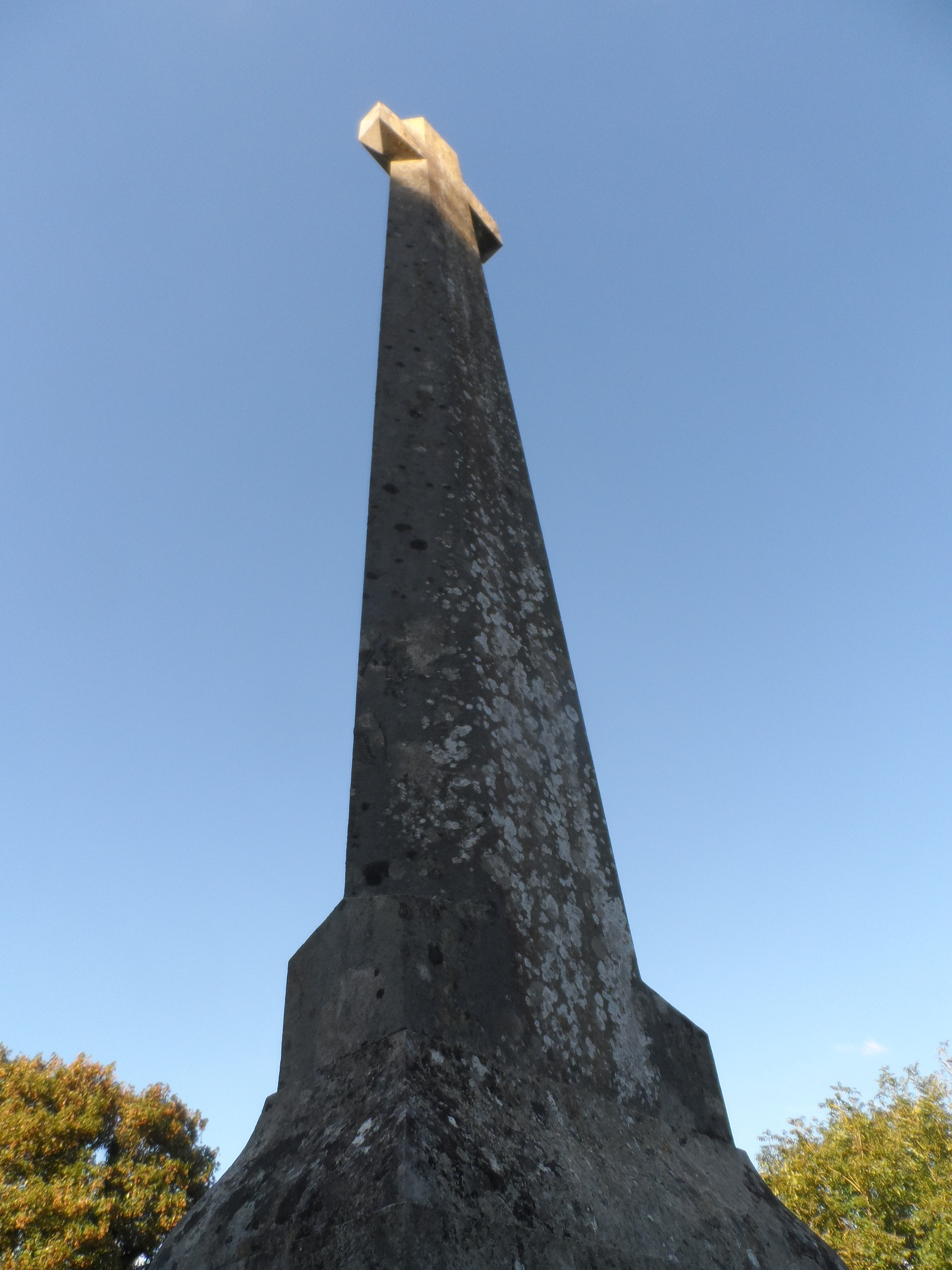
Close-up of Lutyens's War Cross design and lozenge-shaped tapered shaft in Portland stone

Busbridge War Memorial is an instance of Lutyens's War Cross, a design he used 15 times, mostly in small villages, and each with local variations. It is a lozenge-shaped tapered shaft in Portland stone, approximately 7 metres (23 feet) tall with short arms near the top of the shaft, linked to it with cyma moulding. The cross stands on a base of four uneven rectangular stone blocks which themselves stand on an undercut square plinth, at the foot of which are three shallow stone steps. Its position at the end of the triangular churchyard, on the junction of Brighton Road and Hambledon Road, makes it a prominent landmark. The Pevsner Architectural Guide for Surrey describes it as "elegant" and possessing "the same over-developed sense of volumetric relations as" the Cenotaph.

The largest stone at the base of the cross bears the memorial's inscription:

MCMXIV–MCMXIX; THEY COUNTED NOT THEIR LIVES DEAR UNTO THEMSELVES

The dates of the Second World War (MCMXXXIX–MCMXXXXV) were added at a later date below the first inscription.

The memorial does not contain any names. The cross is one of three parts to the war commemoration in Busbridge—inside the church is a roll of honour (or book of remembrance), listing the names of the village's 42 dead, and a pair of stained-glass windows by Archibald Keightley Nicholson. The windows (one of three pairs) depict Amiens Cathedral and Scapa Flow.

== History ==
Busbridge War Memorial was dedicated by the Reverend H. M. Larner and unveiled by General Sir Charles Monro, 1st Baronet at a ceremony on 23 July 1922. The unveiling, on a Sunday evening, attracted a large crowd, among them several local veterans and senior military officers including Lieutenant Colonel Bernard Freyberg, another of Lutyens's clients. Larner was the local rector and was an army chaplain during the war. Monro held several senior positions in the army through the war and was the colonel of the Queen's Royal Regiment (West Surrey). In that capacity, he unveiled several war memorials in the county, including the regiment's primary memorial in Holy Trinity Church, Guildford, as well as Banstead War Memorial and Streatham War Memorial. Monro praised the village's war dead, noting that many of them volunteered at an early stage and now lay in "honourable repose" abroad. He concluded that the monument was necessary to record, and remind the nation's youth, of the men's achievements. The ceremony concluded with the Last Post and Reveille, sounded by three buglers of the Grenadier Guards, and the national anthem, "God Save the King". A study of the war's effect on Surrey described Monro's remarks at the unveilings as showing "a sensitive understanding of the architectural power of remembrance".

The memorial was designated a Grade II listed building on 1 February 1991. In November 2015, as part of the commemorations of the centenary of the First World War, Historic England—the government body responsible for listing—recognised Lutyens's war memorials as a national collection and all of his free-standing memorials in England were listed or had their listing status reviewed and their list entries updated with new research. As part of this process, Busbridge's memorial was upgraded from Grade II to Grade II*. Listed building status provides legal protection from demolition or unsympathetic modification. Grade II is the lowest of three grades, used for over 90 per cent of listings; Grade II* is the second-highest category, reserved for "particularly important buildings of more than special interest" and contains about 5.5 per cent of listings. Busbridge's list entry describes it as a "simple yet elegant cross" and "an eloquent witness to the tragic impacts of world events on this community".

Three other memorials by Lutyens stand in the same churchyard—to Julia Jekyll (Gertrude's mother, died 1895); Francis McLaren MP (died 1917), who is commemorated on Lutyens's Spalding War Memorial; and a joint memorial to Gertrude, her brother Sir Herbert Jekyll, and his wife Dame Agnes Jekyll (died 1932–1937); all three memorials are Grade II listed. The war memorial's list entry recognises the "significant group value" of the set of Lutyens memorials in the churchyard combined with St John's Church, which is itself Grade II* listed.

== See also ==
- Abinger Common War Memorial, another Lutyens war memorial in Surrey of similar design
- List of works by Edwin Lutyens
- War memorials in Surrey
- Grade II* listed buildings in Waverley, Surrey
- Grade II* listed war memorials in England
