= Hechler =

Hechler is a German surname. Notable people with the surname include:

- William Hechler (1845–1931), English Anglican priest
- Ken Hechler (1914-2016), American politician

== See also ==
- Hechler forcing
- Heckling (disambiguation)
- Heckle (disambiguation)
- Heckler (disambiguation)
