= Jekyll =

Jekyll may refer to:

== Entertainment ==
=== Film ===
- The Two Faces of Dr. Jekyll, a 1960 horror film
- Dr. Jekyll y el Hombre Lobo, a 1972 Spanish horror film
- Jekyll (2007 film), a 2007 horror film

=== Television ===
- Jekyll (TV series), a 2007 BBC television series
- Jekyll & Hyde (TV series), a 2015 ITV television series

=== Theatre ===
- Jekyll & Hyde (musical), a 1997 Broadway musical

=== Music ===
- Jekyll, a 2013 re-release of Hyde (EP) by South Korean boy band VIXX
- "Jekyll", a song by Exo on the album Obsession

== Literature ==
- Strange Case of Dr Jekyll and Mr Hyde, a 1886 novella by Robert Louis Stevenson
  - Dr Jekyll and Mr Hyde (character), the protagonist of the novella

== Places ==
- Jekyll Island, an island off the coast of the U.S. state of Georgia
  - Jekyll Island Club, private club located thereon

== Other uses ==
- Jekyll (software), a static blogging platform
- Jekyll (surname)

== See also ==
- Dr. Jekyll and Mr. Hyde (disambiguation)
