= Jekyll (surname) =

Jekyll is a Cornish and Breton family name. It is commonly pronounced /ˈdʒɛkəl/, although the traditional pronunciation is /ˈdʒiːkəl/. Notable people with the surname include:

- Dame Agnes Jekyll (1861–1937), British artist, writer and philanthropist
- Gertrude Jekyll (1843–1932), British gardener
- Sir Joseph Jekyll (1663–1738), British lawyer, politician and judge
- Olga Jekyll (1918–2014), New Zealand fencer
- Walter Jekyll (1849–1929), English clergyman, brother of Gertrude

Fictional

- Dr Henry Jekyll, fictional character from the novel Strange Case of Dr Jekyll and Mr Hyde

The modern Breton form is Gicquel (fr).
