= Heckler (disambiguation) =

A heckler is a person who shouts an uninvited comment at a performance or event.

Heckler or The Heckler may also refer to:

- Heckler (character), a fictional character by DC comics
- Heckler (surname)
- Heckler & Koch, a German weapons manufacturing company
- The Georgetown Heckler, an undergraduate humor magazine at Georgetown University
- The Heckler (newspaper), a satirical sports newspaper
- Hecklers, a programme on BBC Radio 4
- Heckler (film), a documentary starring Jamie Kennedy, which takes swipes at not only hecklers who pester comedians, but also at film critics
- The Heckler (1940 film), a 1940 comedy film
- The Heckler (2015 film), a 2015 comedy film

== See also ==
- Heckle (disambiguation)
