= Heckle (disambiguation) =

A heckler is a person who harasses and tries to disconcert others with questions, challenges, or gibes.

Heckle may also refer to:

- Heckle (band), a New Jersey musical group
- Heckle (magpie), an animated character

== See also ==
- AFI / Heckle, a punk rock split EP
- Heckler (disambiguation)
- Heckling (disambiguation)
- Dr. Heckyll and Mr. Jive (disambiguation)
