= Busbridge Church =

St John the Baptist, Busbridge
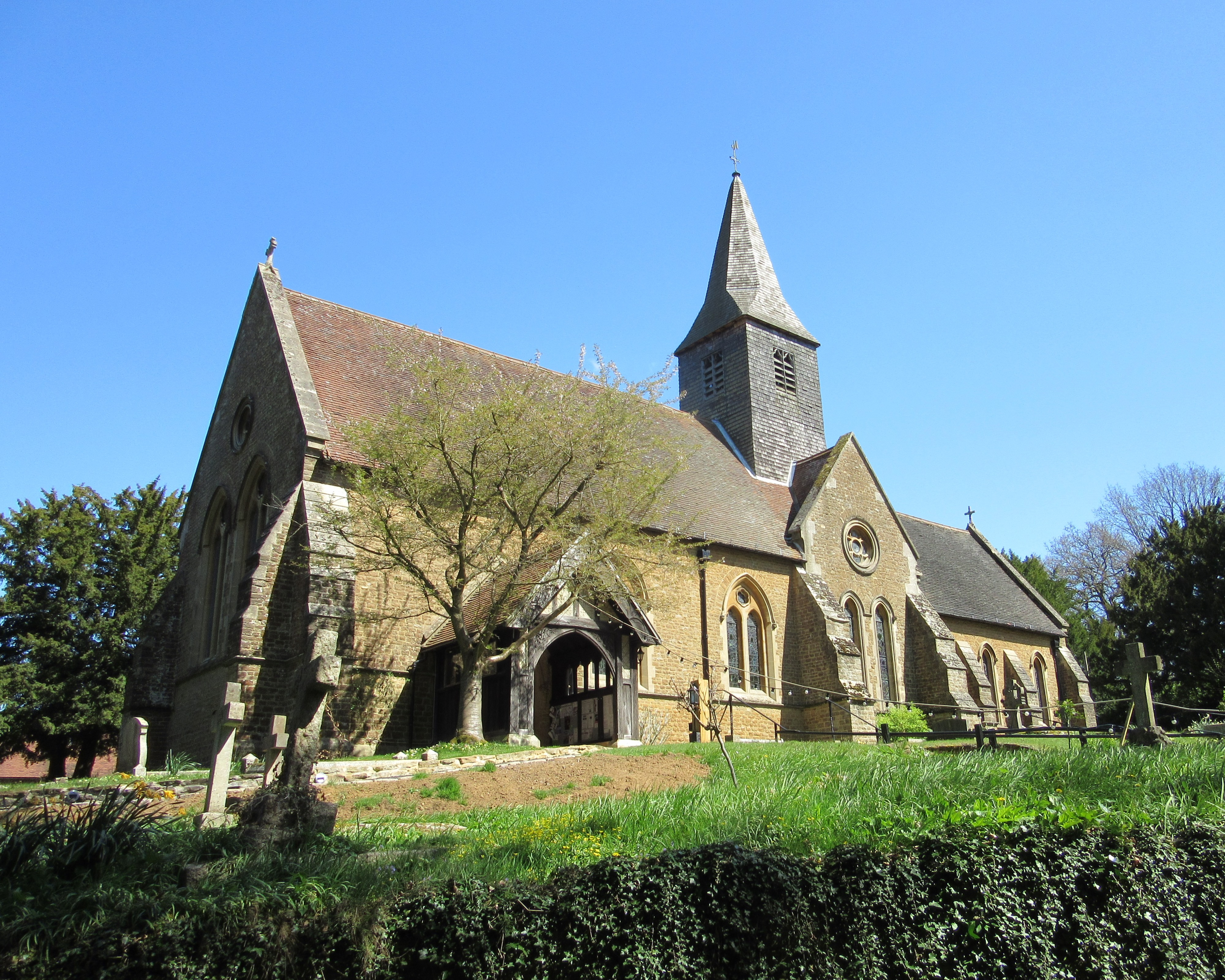
- The church viewed from the west
- St John the Baptist, Busbridge
- 51°10′38.0″N 0°36′6.4″W
- Location: Brighton Road, Busbridge, Godalming, Surrey GU7 1XA
- Country: England
- Denomination: Church of England
- Website: www.bhcgodalming.org

History
- Founded: 1867
- Founder(s): Mr and Mrs John Ramsden of Busbridge Hall
- Dedicated: 1867

Architecture
- Architect: George Gilbert Scott
- Style: Gothic Revival
- Years built: 1865-1867

Administration
- Diocese: Guildford
- Archdeaconry: Surrey
- Deanery: Godalming
- Parish: Busbridge

Clergy
- Rector: Simon Taylor
- Vicar(s): Simon Willetts (Associate Vicar), Margot Spencer, Andy Spencer

Busbridge Church or St John the Baptist Church, is an evangelical Anglican Church in Busbridge, Godalming, England. Busbridge Church is part of a joint benefice with Hambledon Church in the village of Hambledon, Surrey. Together Busbridge and Hambledon Church have six Sunday congregations ranging from traditional to modern and contemporary services. On a Sunday Busbridge Church and Hambledon Church put on youth and children's groups for over 200 young people.

== History ==
Busbridge Church was founded by John and Emma Ramsden of Busbridge Hall. Building work took place between 1865 and 1867 and finished with the building's dedication in 1867. The church was designed by George Gilbert Scott and has a wrought-iron chancel screen by Edwin Lutyens, who also designed the First World War memorial. There are stained glass windows by Morris & Co., including Edward Burne-Jones, and later ones by Archibald Keightley Nicholson. The church is designated as a Grade II* listed building.

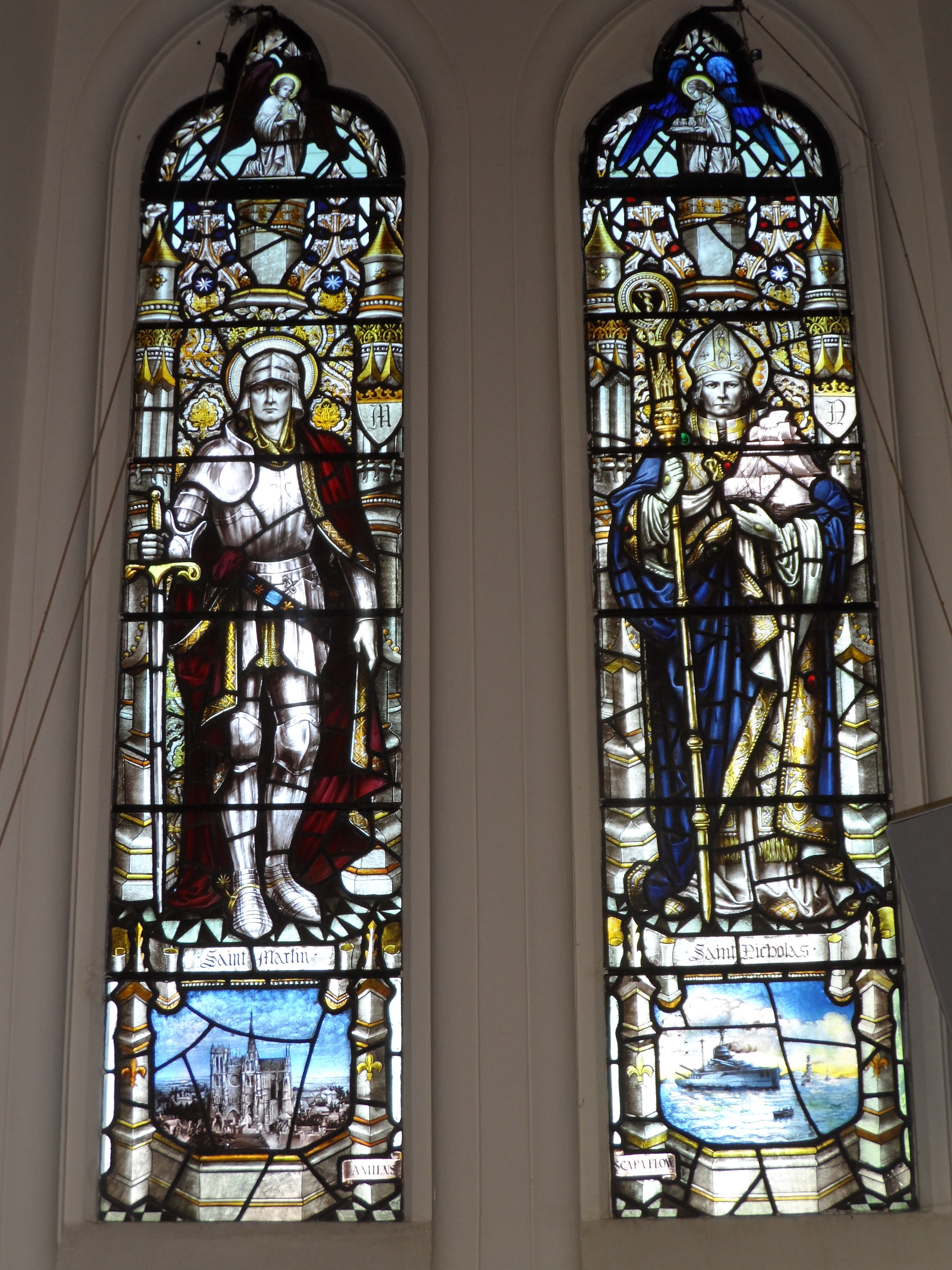
Main WWI memorial window by Archibald Keightley Nicholson. The left-hand pane shows Saint Martin above Amiens Cathedral. The right-hand pane shows Saint Nicholas above Scapa Flow and battleships of the Grand Fleet

== Memorials ==
The churchyard contains several significant memorials by architect Sir Edwin Lutyens, who also designed the house at nearby Munstead Wood for his friend and collaborator Gertrude Jekyll. Lutyens designed Busbridge War Memorial, a Grade II* listed building, unveiled in 1922, which sits at the end of the churchyard at the junction of Brighton Road and Hambledon Road. It is one of dozens of Lutyens' war memorials around England and elsewhere after the First World War and one of fifteen of his War Crosses, which all share a similar design. The names of the village's war dead are listed on a plaque inside the church. Lutyens also designed memorials to Julia Jekyll (Gertrude's mother), Francis McLaren, and a joint memorial to Sir Herbert Jekyll (Gertrude's brother) and his wife Dame Agnes Jekyll, and to Gertrude herself.

== Sunday Services ==
=== Busbridge Church ===
==== 9:30am Contemporary Service ====
Worship is band-led and there is regular use of modern media. Holy Communion is on the third Sunday.

==== 11:15am Classic Service ====
Classic congregation then meets in Busbridge Church from 11.15am till 12.00pm. They follow Common Worship. Holy Communion is celebrated on the first Sunday of the month. The worship and music style is both traditional with contemporary songs and hymns with the aid of a church organ.

==== 6:00pm Evening Worship ====
This is an informal evening service with extended periods of music and a relaxed atmosphere. Holy Communion is on the fourth Sunday of every month.

== Gallery ==
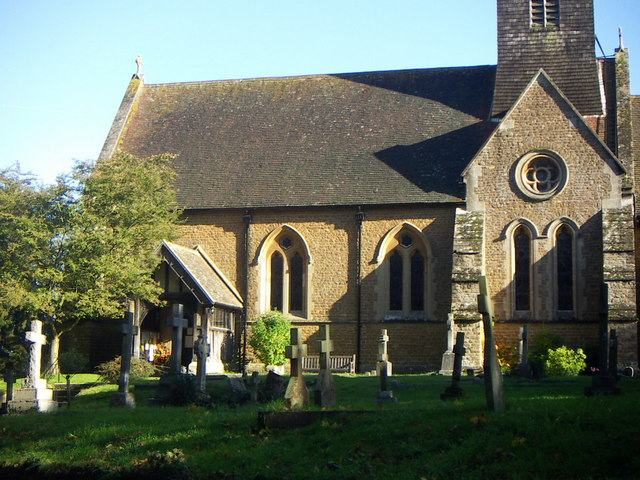
Exterior

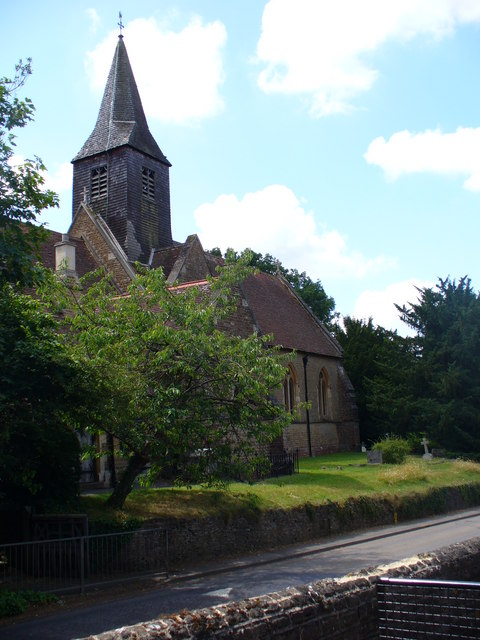
View along Brighton Road

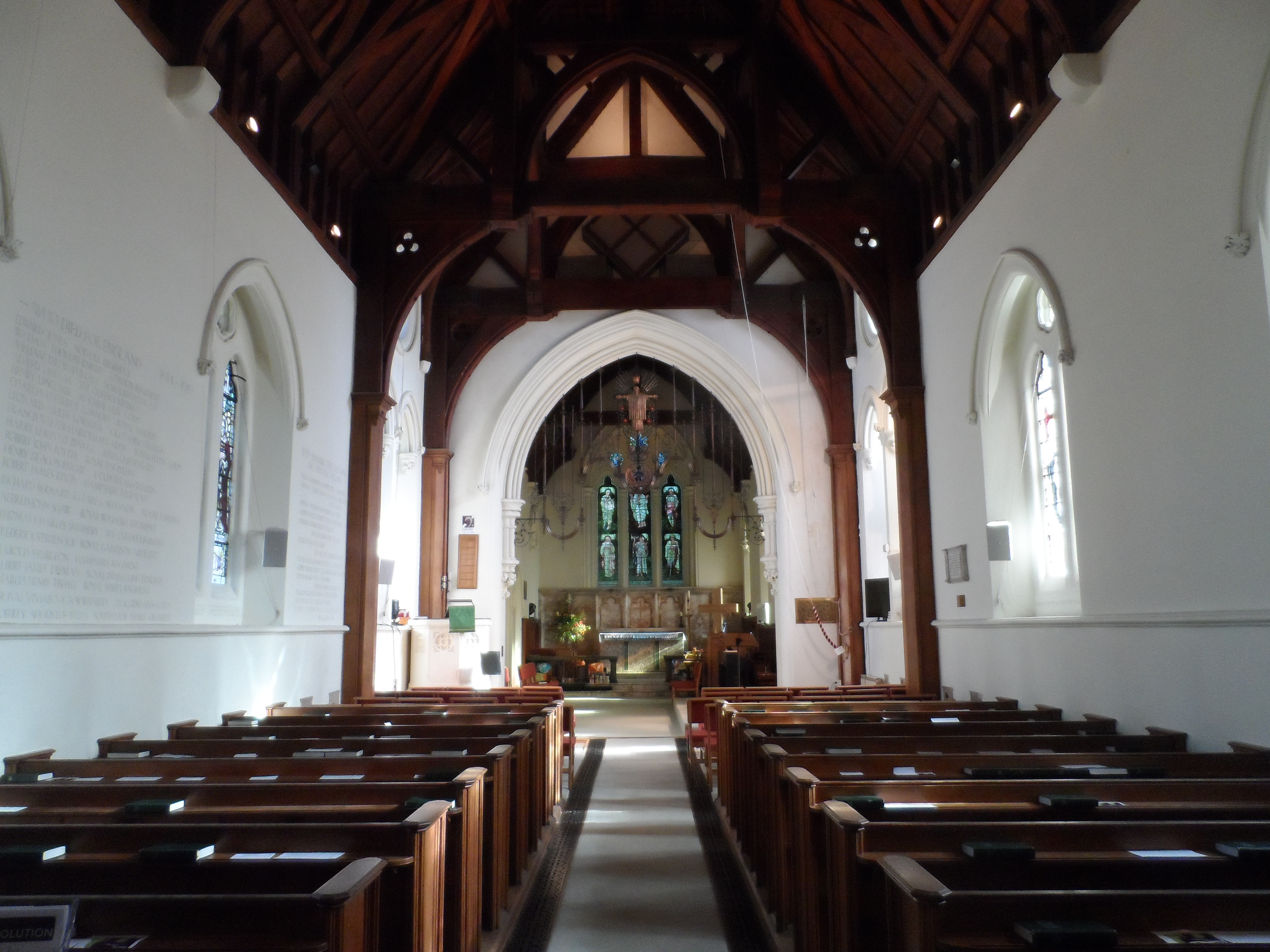
Interior

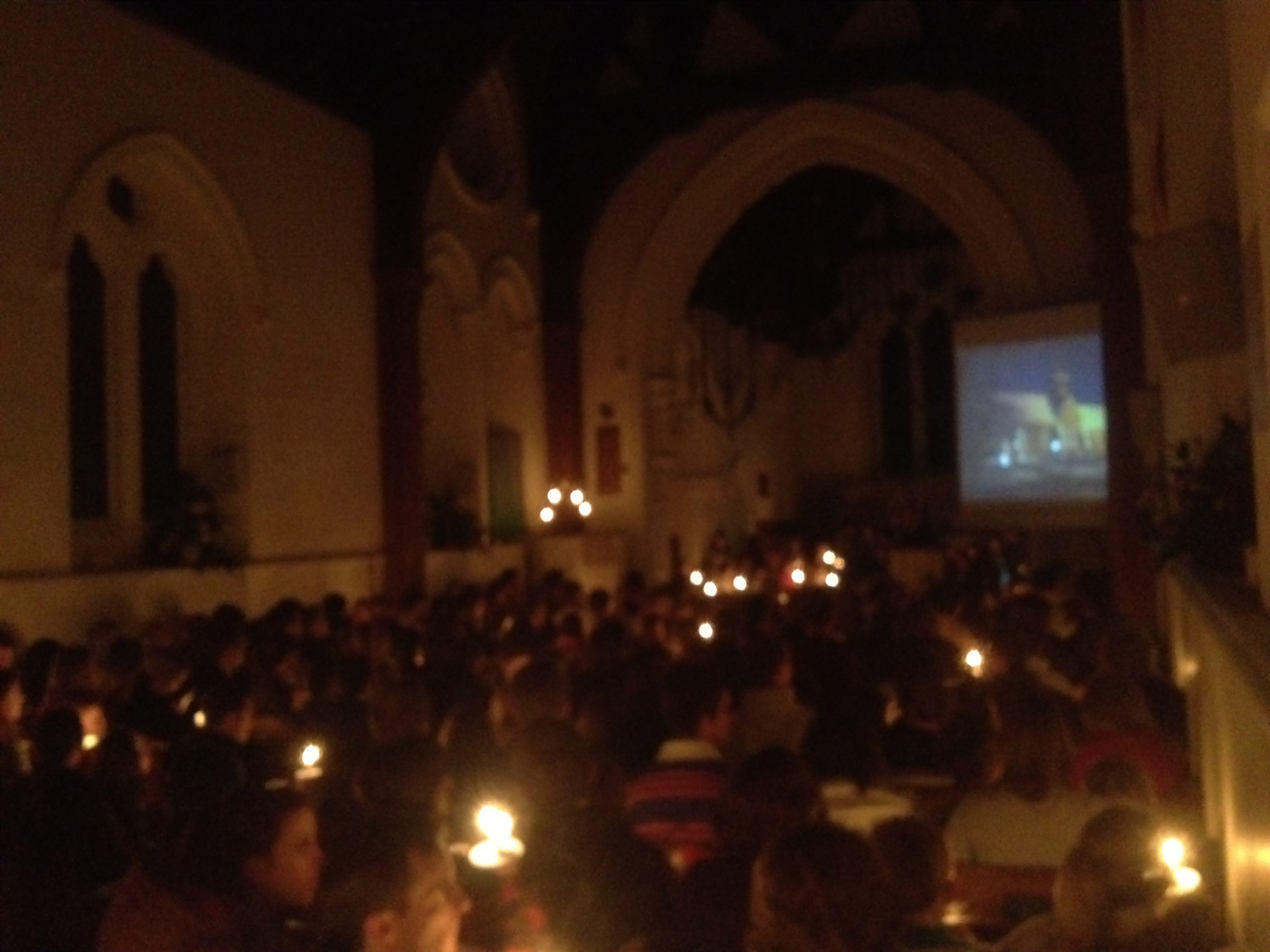
Christmas Eve at Busbridge Church in 2011

== See also ==
- Diocese of Guildford
