= Jekyll Memorial, Busbridge =

Jekyll Memorial
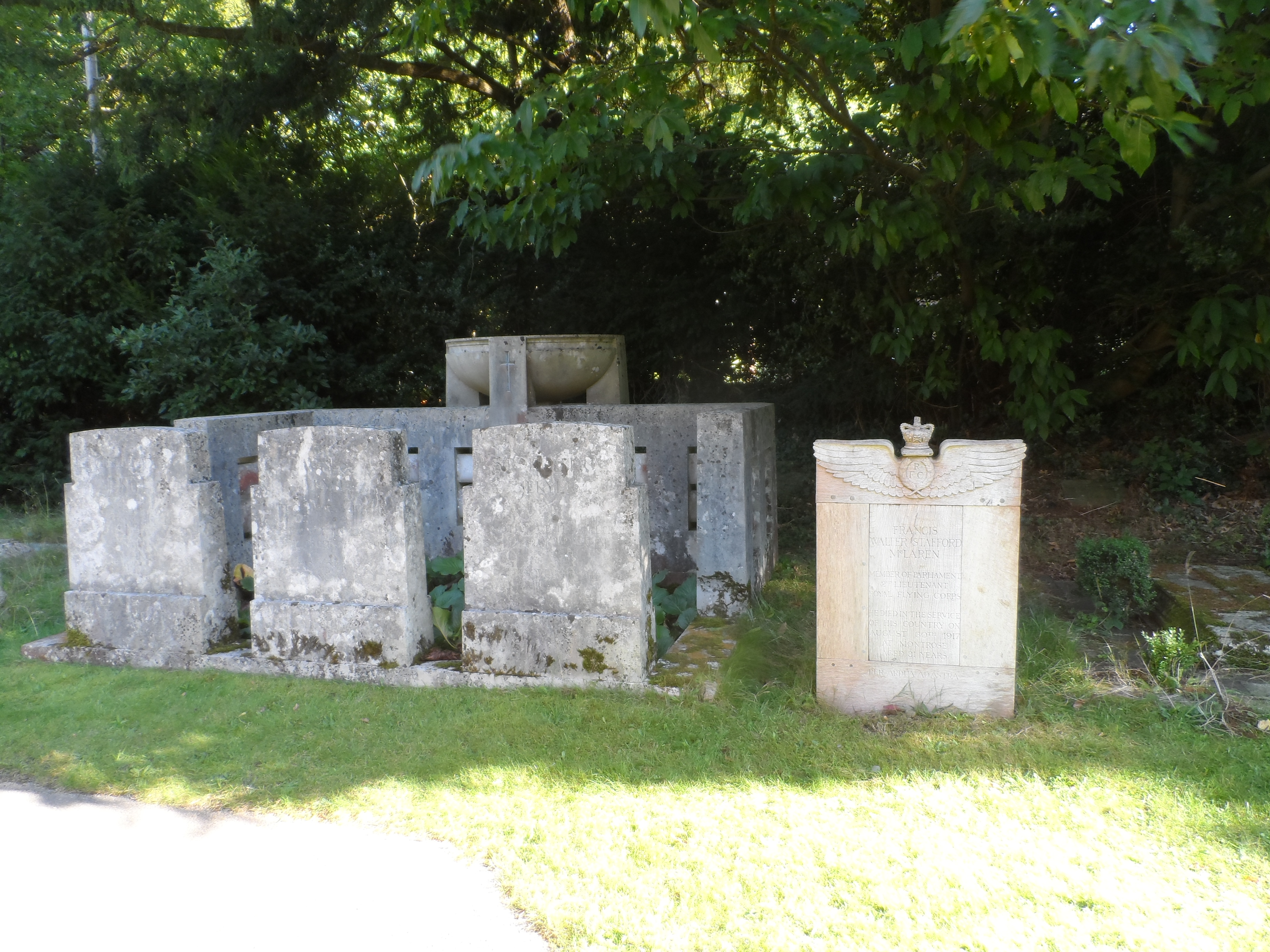
- Memorials to the Jekylls, left, and Francis McLaren, right

- Location within Surrey
- 51°10′37″N 0°36′05″W
- Type: Memorial
- Location: Busbridge,

History
- Built: C.1932

Site notes
- Area: Surrey
- Architect: Edwin Lutyens

Listed Building – Grade II
- Official name: Jekyll Memorial
- Designated: 1 February 1991
- Reference no.: 1044532

Listed Building – Grade II
- Official name: McLaren Headboard
- Designated: 1 February 1991
- Reference no.: 1188875

The Jekyll Memorial, Busbridge, Surrey, England, commemorates the gardener Gertrude Jekyll and members of her family. Designed by Jekyll's friend and collaborator, Edwin Lutyens and constructed in 1932, it is a Grade II listed structure.

== History and architecture ==
Gertrude Jekyll (1843–1932) was a gardener whose work had considerable influence on subsequent garden design theory and practice. A close friend of Edwin Lutyens, she collaborated with him on designs for over 100 gardens. In 1896, Lutyens designed Jekyll's house, Munstead Wood, at Munstead Heath near Busbridge. The death of "Aunt Bumps", as Lutyens called Jekyll, in December 1932, shortly after that of her brother Herbert in September the same year, led Lutyens to design a family memorial. Tributes to Dame Agnes, Herbert's widow, who died in 1937, (Note: The Historic England listing for the memorial incorrectly records her death as occurring in 1860.) and to Francis, their only son who died in 1965, were subsequently added.

The memorial is located at the south-east corner of the Church of St John the Baptist in Busbridge. It comprises three stone tomb slabs, placed in front of a stone exedra which is topped by a semi-circular urn. Pevsner describes the whole as "an intricate composition, oddly like Soane translated into the blunt obtuse forms of the 1930s". The original inscription read 'In remembrance of Herbert and Gertrude Jekyll long time dwellers in their homes in Munstead who passed to their rest in the Autumn of 1932. / Their joy was in the work of their hands: their memorial is the beauty which lives after them'. This was later updated to include reference to Herbert's widow; 'Also of Agnes Jekyll whose spirit ever dwelt in loving kindness'. The memorial is a Grade II listed structure.

== Memorial to Francis McLaren ==
To the right of the Jekyll Memorial stands a carved wooden headboard commemorating Francis McLaren (1886–1917). McLaren had married Barbara Jekyll, daughter of Sir Herbert and Lady Jekyll, and was killed in a flying accident in 1917. The headboard was also designed by Lutyens and consists of five, pegged, panels, showing the arms of the Royal Flying Corps and carrying details of McLaren's career as a member of parliament and as a second lieutenant in the RFC. It has its own Grade II listing.

== Sources ==
- Amery, Colin; Richardson, Margaret; Stamp, Gavin (1981). Lutyens: The Work of the English Architect Sir Edwin Lutyens. London: Arts Council of Great Britain. ISBN 9780728703032.
- Hussey, Christopher (1989) [1950]. The Life of Sir Edwin Lutyens. Woodbridge: Antique Collectors Club. ISBN 978-0-907462-59-0.
- Pevsner, Nikolaus; Nairn, Ian; Cherry, Bridget (1987). Surrey. The Buildings Of England. Harmondsworth, Middlesex: Penguin Books. ISBN 0-14-071021-3. OCLC 256866115.
