= Busbridge =

Village in Surrey, England

Coordinates: 51°10′23″N 0°36′04″W

- Village
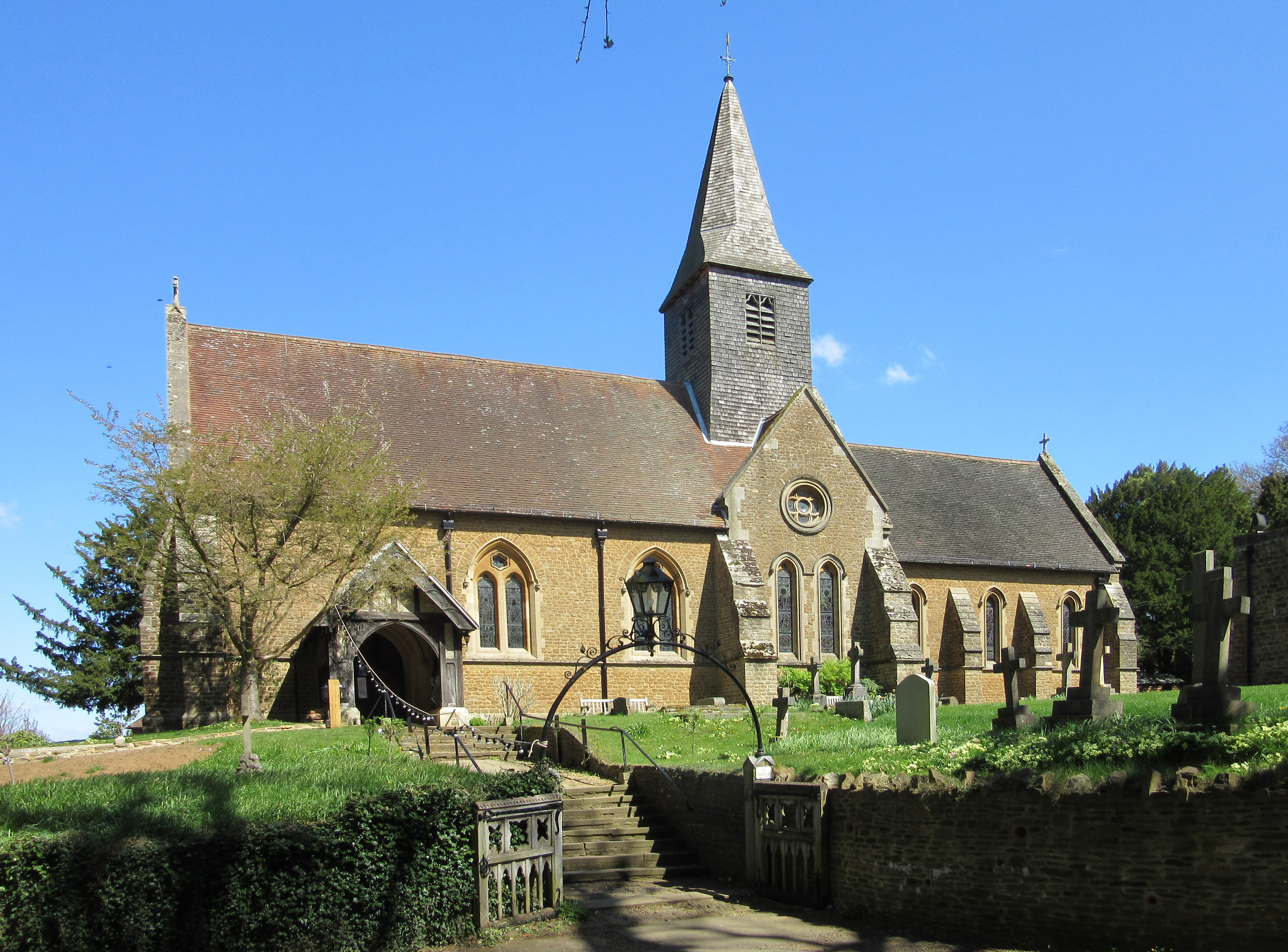
- Busbridge Church built by Mr and Mrs Ramsden of Busbridge Hall, designed by George Gilbert Scott

- Location within Surrey
- OS grid reference: SU979425
- Civil parish: Godalming
- District: Waverley
- Shire county: Surrey
- Region: South East
- Country: England
- Sovereign state: United Kingdom
- Post town: GODALMING
- Postcode district: GU8
- Dialling code: 01483
- Police: Surrey
- Fire: Surrey
- Ambulance: South East Coast
- UK Parliament: Godalming and Ash

Busbridge is a village in the civil parish of Godalming, in the borough of Waverley in Surrey, England that adjoins the town of Godalming. It was until the Tudor period often recorded as Bushbridge and was a manor and hamlet of Godalming until gaining an ecclesiastical parish in 1865 complemented by a secular, civil parish in 1933 until 1 April 2024. The rest of the former parish was renamed as Munstead and Tuesley.

== History ==
Busbridge was wholly in the Anglo-Saxon hundred of Godalming, Surrey but had at the Domesday Book of 1086 no entries, being a rural, farmed part of Godalming and wooded part within the Weald, a remnant forest stretching into Sussex and West Kent.

Upper Eashing or High tithing in the 13th century Hundred Rolls formed early Busbridge, as the name Busbridge began to be used after de Bushbridge, the medieval family who came to own the manor by the 15th century. They came from Kent and are first recorded here in 1384 as 'Burssabrugge' or 'Burrshebrugge'.

Busbridge gained an ecclesiastical parish in 1865 complemented by a secular, civil parish in 1933.

In 1956 Tuesley Court Farm was acquired by the Franciscan order and renamed Ladywell Convent after the Lady Well, one of the series of lakes forming much of the stream running through Busbridge. As part of this sale, it acquired an earlier converted pagan sanctuary and erected a statue of the Virgin Mary.

=== Establishment of a church ===
The Church of St. John the Baptist, designed by George Gilbert Scott, was built in a 13th-century style of Bargate stone with chalky limestone quoins, a central tower and windows. It was consecrated on completion in 1867. It is Grade II* listed. The churchyard contains several significant memorials by Lutyens, including the Busbridge War Memorial, a Grade II* listed structure, unveiled in 1922, one of fifteen of his War Crosses, which share a similar design. The names of the village's war dead are listed on a plaque inside the church. He also designed memorials to Julia Jekyll (Gertrude's mother), Francis McLaren, and a joint memorial to Sir Herbert Jekyll (Gertrude's brother) and his wife Dame Agnes Jekyll, and to Gertrude herself.

== Economy ==
The village's economy is bound closely to Godalming as the two settlements are contiguous, that is, the part of Busbridge where most of its residents live as it forms a scattered settlement, rather than a nucleated village. The latter large town is formed of seven surrounding suburban villages, together with an urban centre with a railway station on the Portsmouth Direct Line which runs from London, diverging from the SWML at Woking, and bordered on the far side by the A3.

== Amenities ==
Busbridge has two infant schools, a junior school and a sixth form college.

Busbridge Tennis Association is a community initiative which was fundamental in the process of renovating the tennis courts and recreation ground at the top of Holloway Hill and overlooking Godalming. In 2012 they secured £37,900 of Olympic Legacy Funding from Sport England's Inspired Facilities Fund for flood lights on all four courts allowing for expansion with junior tennis training.

== Transport ==
The nearest railway stations are Godalming and Milford on the Portsmouth Direct Line. These are approximately 2 miles (3.2 km) from the western side of the village.

The area is served by three mid-distance local roads converging on the south of Godalming, each scaling the wooded slopes of the Greensand Ridge; none are dual carriageways. The main road through the village is the B2130 Brighton Road which connects Godalming and Dunsfold.
