= Hambledon Church =

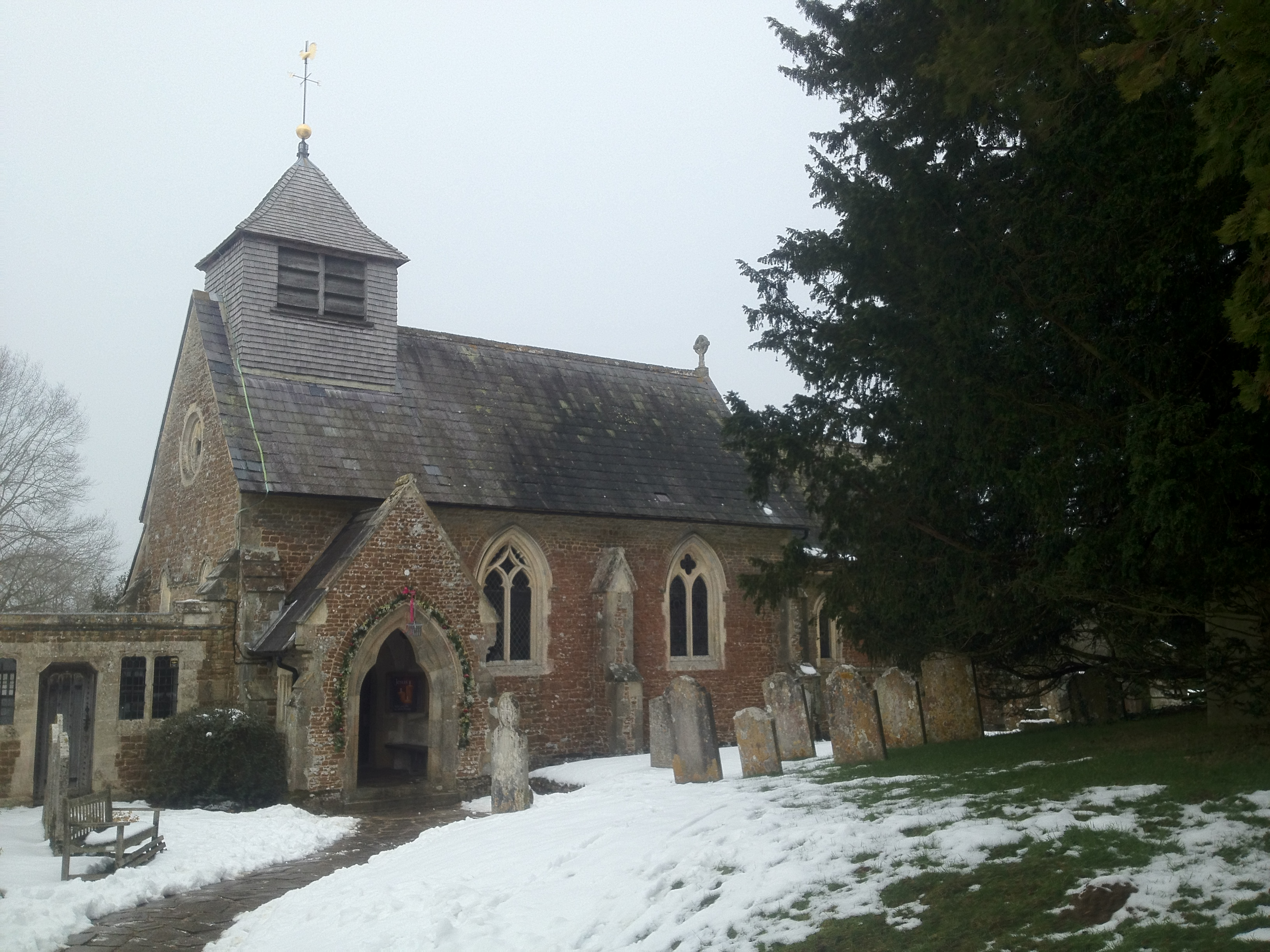
- Hambledon Church
- 51°8′31.4″N 0°36′51.6″W
- Location: Hambledon, Surrey
- Country: England
- Denomination: Church of England
- Website: www.bhcgodalming.org

History
- Former name: St Peter's Church
- Founded: Before 1290AD

Architecture
- Style: Tractarian mid-Victorian
- Years built: Rebuilt 1846AD by Rev E Bullock

Administration
- Diocese: Guildford
- Archdeaconry: Surrey
- Deanery: Godalming
- Parish: Busbridge and Hambledon

Clergy
- Rector: Simon Taylor
- Vicar(s): Simon Willetts (Associate Vicar), Margot Spencer, Andy Spencer, David Jenkins

Hambledon Church as it is known locally (historically known as St Peters) is an evangelical Anglican Church in Hambledon, Surrey, United Kingdom. Hambledon Church is part of a parish with Busbridge Church connected to the large village or small town of Godalming, Surrey. Together Busbridge and Hambledon Church have six Sunday congregations ranging from traditional to modern and contemporary services. The Patrons are the Martyrs Memorial and the Church of England Charitable Trust.

== History ==
Hambledon Church was founded by Ranaulf Flambard before 1086. There are detailed records of Christian worship taking place on the site since before the 14th century. A roll of Rectors on the West wall of the church records Rectors from 1301 to the present Rector (2010) and vicar with special responsibility in the village (2012).

The half-county of the West of Surrey was originally in the Diocese of Winchester but benefitted from closer connections to its charitable and spiritual senior leaders on the establishment in the early 20th century of a more local cathedral and clergy on establishment of the Diocese of Guildford.

=== Architecture ===
The building has a tall square, wood-shingled bell-cot at the western end with double louvred-windows to either side. It has a pyramidal roof over the bellcote topped by a ball and a weathervane finial. Buttressing supports the west end with a quatrefoil roundel window over two lancet windows below, all with linked hood moulds. One 'decorated style' two-light window and one plate tracery window to south side also has mouldings above. There are also gabled offset buttress between lancet north chapel windows underneath mouldings with sill bands and string courses linking windows with the buttresses and the building has a cornice (band of prominent stone beneath the roof). Much of this ornamentation was added in 1846 and the building is listed in the initial architectural protected status category of Grade II.

== Sunday Services ==
=== 10:00am Morning Worship Service ===
A popular service with hymns led by an organist. Holy Communion is offered on the second and fifth Sunday of each month.

=== 4:00pm Messy Church ===
On third Sundays there is an all age service with Messy Church activities, craft and worship at Hambledon Village Hall.
