= Heckler (surname) =

Heckler is a surname. Notable people with the surname include:

- David Heckler (born 1947), American politician
- Edmund Heckler (1906–1960), German weapons manufacturer and businessman
- Margaret Heckler (1931-2018), American politician
- Mark A. Heckler, American academic administrator
