= The Heckler (newspaper) =

American newspaper in Chicago, Illinois

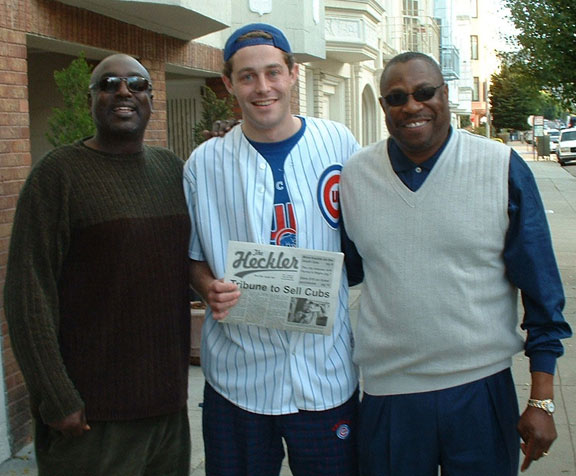
- Founder of The Heckler poses in 2003 with Cubs coach Gary Matthews (left) and manager Dusty Baker (right).
- Type: Monthly Satirical Sports Paper
- Format: Newspaper and Web site
- Owner: Private investors
- Editor: Brad Zibung
- Founded: April 2003
- Headquarters: Chicago, Illinois
- Circulation: 30,000 per month
- Website: TheHeckler.com

The Heckler is a satirical sports newspaper created in 2003 by Brad Zibung (born 1976) and George Ellis (born 1977). It is based in Chicago and chronicles the pratfalls of the fabled Chicago Cubs baseball club as well as other major Chicago sports teams and athletes.

The Heckler has received acclaim from the Chicago Reader, The Chicago Sun-Times, Chicago Tribune, Chicago Tonight on WTTW, WFLD's Fox News in the AM, WGN-TV, ESPN Radio Chicago, WSCR, Time Out Chicago and the Sporting News. It has subscribers in 40 states.

In 2006 The Heckler branched beyond the Chicago Cubs and began covering all major Chicago sports.

In March 2007, The Heckler published its first book, The Cubs Fan's Guide to Happiness.
