= Dr. Jekyll and Mr. Hyde (disambiguation) =

Strange Case of Dr Jekyll and Mr Hyde is an 1886 novella by Robert Louis Stevenson.

This page lists Wikipedia articles using "Dr. Jekyll and Mr. Hyde" or a very similar name, or links to the most closely related article for items using that name that do not have a Wikipedia article. For a fuller list of adaptations, including those using other names, see Adaptations of Strange Case of Dr. Jekyll and Mr. Hyde.

Dr. Jekyll and Mr. Hyde may also refer to:

- Dr Jekyll and Mr Hyde (character), a character in Robert Louis Stevenson's Strange Case of Dr. Jekyll and Mr. Hyde

== Film ==
- Dr. Jekyll and Mr. Hyde (1908 film), the first screen adaptation of Stevenson's novella
- Dr. Jekyll and Mr. Hyde (1908), directed by Sidney Olcott
- Den skæbnesvangre Opfindelse (US title: Dr. Jekyll and Mr. Hyde) (1910), directed by August Blom
- Dr. Jekyll and Mr. Hyde (1912 film), starring James Cruze
- Dr. Jekyll and Mr. Hyde (1913 film), directed by Herbert Brenon and Carl Laemmle
- Dr. Jekyll and Mr. Hyde (1913), produced by Charles Urban
- Dr. Jekyll and Mr. Hyde (1920 Haydon film), directed and written by J. Charles Haydon
- Dr. Jekyll and Mr. Hyde (1920 Paramount film), featuring John Barrymore
- Dr. Jekyll and Mr. Hyde (1931 film), starring Fredric March
- Dr. Jekyll and Mr. Hyde (1941 film), featuring Spencer Tracy
- Chehre Pe Chehra (1981 film), an adaptation of the 1886 novella
- Dr Jekyll and Mr Hyde (2002 film), starring John Hannah
- The Strange Case of Dr. Jekyll and Mr. Hyde (2006 film), a film starring Tony Todd
- Doctor Jekyll (2023 film), a film starring Eddie Izzard
- Dr. Jekyll and Ms. Hyde
- Dr. Jekyll and Sister Hyde
- Jekyll and Hyde... Together Again

== Television ==
- The Strange Case of Dr. Jekyll and Mr. Hyde (1968 film), a television film starring Jack Palance
- Jekyll and Hyde (TV series), a 2015 British television series written by Charlie Higson
- "Dr. Jekyll and Mr. Hyde", a 1955 episode of Climax!
- Dr. Jekyll and Mr. Hyde, characters in the television series Once Upon A Time
- Adam, character based on Jekyll and Hyde in the Canadian television series Sanctuary

== Stage ==
- Dr. Jekyll and Mr. Hyde (1887 play), a stage adaptation by Thomas Russell Sullivan
- Dr. Jekyll and Mr. Hyde (1888 play), a stage adaptation by John McKinney
- Dr. Jekyll and Mr. Hyde, Or a Mis-Spent Life, an 1897 stage adaptation by Luella Forepaugh and George F. Fish
- Jekyll & Hyde (musical), a 1997 Broadway musical based on the story

== Music ==
- Dr. Jeckyll & Mr. Hyde (group), a 1980s hip hop group consisting of Andre "Dr Jeckyll" Harrell and Alonzo "Mr Hyde" Brown
- Jeckyll & Hyde (musicians), a Dutch duo
- Jekyll and Hyde (Petra album), a 2003 album from Christian rock band Petra
  - Jekyll & Hyde en Español, the 2004 Spanish version of the album
- Jekyll and Hyde (Prime Circle album), a 2010 album from South African rock band Prime Circle
- Jekyll + Hyde, a 2015 album by the Zac Brown Band

=== Songs ===
- "Dr. Jekyll and Mr. Hyde" (song), by The Who, 1968
- "Jekyll and Hyde", a song by Renaissance on the 1979 album Azure d'Or
- "Dr Jekyll & Mr Hyde", a 1981 song by The Damned from their 1980 album The Black Album
- "Dr. Jekyll and Mr. Hyde", a song by Seo Taiji and Boys on the 1994 album, Seo Taiji and Boys III
- "Jekyll and Hyde", a song by Judas Priest on the 2001 album Demolition
- "Jekyll and Hyde", a song by Iced Earth on the 2001 album, Horror Show
- "Jekyll or Hyde", a song by James LaBrie on the 2010 album, Static Impulse
- "Jekyll and Hyde" (song), a 2015 song by Five Finger Death Punch

== Video games ==
- Dr. Jekyll and Mr. Hyde (video game), a 1988 video game
- Jekyll and Hyde (video game), a 2001 video game

== Other ==
- "Dr. Jekyll and Mr. Hyde", a 2000 installment of the National Public Radio series Radio Tales
- Jekyll & Hyde Club, a Manhattan theme restaurant
- Dr. Henry Jekyll / Edward Hyde, a character in The League of Extraordinary Gentlemen

== See also ==
- Dr. Jekyll and Ms. Hyde, a 1995 film directed by David Price
- P. D. Q. Bach and Peter Schickele: The Jekyll and Hyde Tour, a 2007 live recording album
- Dr. Heckyll and Mr. Jive (disambiguation)
