= Francis McLaren =

British Member of Parliament (1886-1917)

The Honourable Francis Walter Stafford McLaren MP
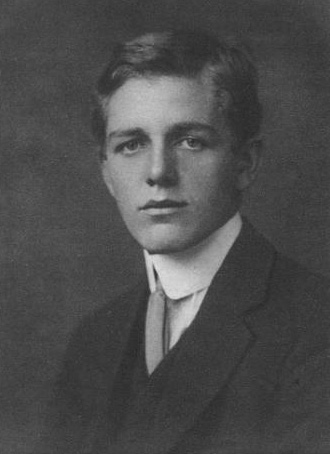
- Francis McLaren

Member of Parliament (MP) for Spalding
- In office January 1910 – 1917

Personal details
- Born: 16 June 1886
- Died: 30 August 1917 (aged 31) Montrose, Scotland
- Resting place: St John's Church, Busbridge, Godalming, Surrey, England
- Party: Liberal
- Spouse: Barbara Jekyll (m. 1911)
- Children: 2
- Parent: Charles McLaren, 1st Baron Aberconway (father)
- Relatives: Martin John McLaren (son); Agnes Jekyll (mother-in-law)
- Education: Eton College
- Alma mater: Balliol College
- Military career
- Allegiance: United Kingdom
- Branch: Royal Navy
- Service years: 1914-1917
- Rank: second lieutenant
- Unit: Royal Naval Volunteer Reserve
- Conflicts: World War I; Gallipoli Campaign

Francis Walter Stafford McLaren (16 June 1886 – 30 August 1917) was a British Member of Parliament killed in the First World War in a flying accident.

== Career ==
A younger son of Charles McLaren, 1st Baron Aberconway, he attended Eton and Balliol College, Oxford. Entering politics, he was elected as Liberal Member of Parliament (MP) for Spalding in January 1910. Between 1910 and 1915, he served as Parliamentary Private Secretary to the Secretary of State for the Colonies, Lewis Vernon Harcourt.

== Family ==
On 20 July 1911, he married Barbara Jekyll, daughter of Colonel Sir Herbert Jekyll (KCMG) and the artist Dame Agnes Jekyll; they had two children:

- Major Martin John McLaren (1914–1979)
- Guy Lewis Ian McLaren (8 November 1915 – 18 August 1978), married Maryse Jubin and had issue

== Military service and death ==
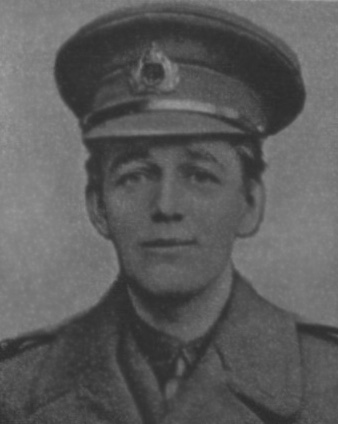
Francis McLaren from the Roll of Honour published in The Illustrated London News on 8 September 1917

He volunteered at the outbreak of war and was commissioned with the Royal Naval Volunteer Reserve. He served with Royal Naval Air Service's Armoured Car Division at Gallipoli. He contracted dysentery there and was eventually invalided out of the Royal Flying Corps on 30 December 1916. However, he appealed and returned to the RFC.

McLaren was a second lieutenant and trainee pilot in Number 18 Training Squadron (RNVR) when he died on 30 August 1917, following a flying accident during training at RAF Montrose. His aeroplane, an AVRO 504A, nosedived into the sea off Montrose. He was pulled unconscious from the wreckage but died of internal injuries. He was buried in Busbridge churchyard, Godalming, Surrey on 5 September.

His widow married Bernard Freyberg in 1922.

== Memorials ==
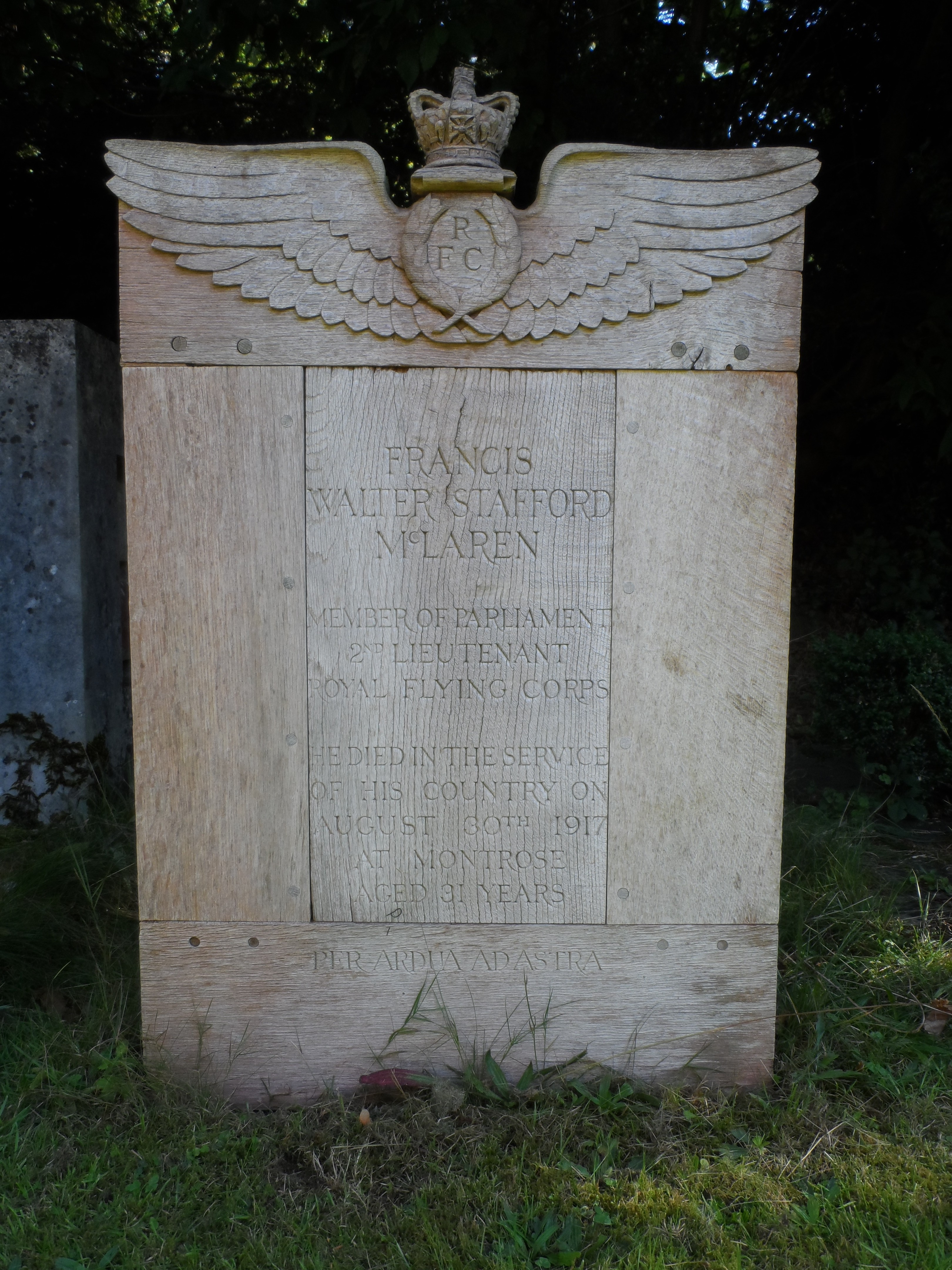
McLaren's headboard, designed by Edwin Lutyens, in the churchyard at Busbridge Church

He is commemorated on Panel 8 of the Parliamentary War Memorial in Westminster Hall, one of 22 MPs that died during the First World War to be named on that memorial. McLaren is one of 19 MPs who fell in the war who are commemorated by heraldic shields in the Commons Chamber. A further act of commemoration came with the unveiling in 1932 of a manuscript-style illuminated book of remembrance for the House of Commons, which includes a short biographical account of the life and death of McLaren.

McLaren's grave at St John's Church, Busbridge is marked by a carved oak headboard, designed by Edwin Lutyens. The headboard is a Grade II listed building in its own right. He is buried alongside members of the Jekyll family. The Jekyll Memorial was also designed by Lutyens and is Grade II listed.

He is commemorated on Spalding War Memorial. The First World War memorial in the gardens of Ayscoughfee Hall in Spalding, Lincolnshire, was also designed by Lutyens. The proposal came from Barbara McLaren and most of the cost came from members of the McLaren and Jekyll families. It is listed Grade I. His name also appears on the village war memorial at Eglwysbach near his father's estate of Bodnant in Denbighshire, north Wales.

Parliament of the United Kingdom
Preceded by Horace Mansfield	Member of Parliament for Spalding; 1910–1917	Succeeded by Arthur George Villiers Peel
