= Dr. Heckyll and Mr. Jive =

Dr. Heckyll and Mr. Jive (a parody of Strange Case of Dr Jekyll and Mr Hyde by Robert Louis Stevenson) may refer to:

== Music ==
- Dr. Heckle and Mr. Jive (England Dan & John Ford Coley album), 1979
- Dr Heckle and Mr Jive (Pigbag album), 1982
- "Dr. Heckyll & Mr. Jive" (song), 1982 song by Men at Work

== See also ==
- Dr. Jekyll and Mr. Hyde (disambiguation)
