= Gicquel =

Gicquel is a Breton surname. Notable people with the surname include:

- Roger Gicquel (1933–2010), TV journalist and presenter
- Jean-Charles Gicquel (born 1967), French high jumper
- Marc Gicquel (born 1977), French tennis player
