= Heckling =

Heckling may refer to:

- Heckler, a person who shouts a disparaging comment
- Heckling (flax), a process in preparing flax for spinning

== See also ==
- Heckling comb, a tool used in flax preparation
- The Heckling Hare, a Merrie Melodies cartoon
