= Agnes Jekyll =

Scottish-born British artist, writer and philanthropist

Dame Agnes Jekyll DBE GCStJ
- Agnes Jekyll, date unknown
- Born: Agnes Lowndes Graham; 12 October 1861; Largs, North Ayrshire, Scotland
- Died: 28 January 1937 (aged 75); Godalming, Surrey, England
- Occupations: Artist, writer and philanthropist

Dame Agnes Lowndes Jekyll, Lady Jekyll DBE GCStJ (née Graham; 12 October 1861 – 28 January 1937) was a Scottish-born British artist, writer and philanthropist. The daughter of William Graham, Liberal MP for Glasgow (1865–1874) and patron of the Pre-Raphaelite Brotherhood, she was educated at home by governesses, and later attended King's College London.

== Family ==
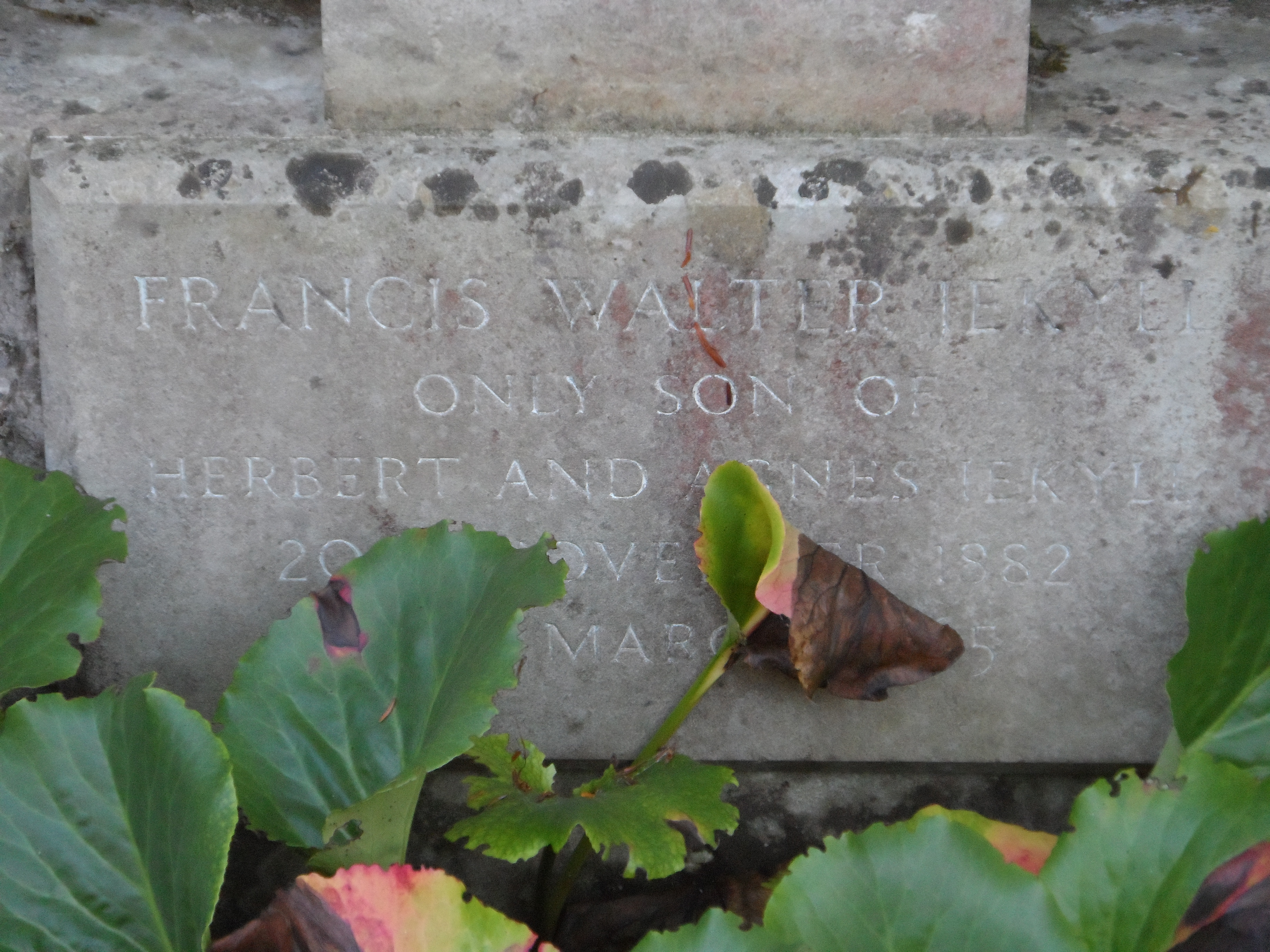
Memorial to Francis Walter Jekyll on the Jekyll memorial at Busbridge Church

Agnes Lowndes Graham married Herbert Jekyll (later Sir Herbert Jekyll, KCMG), a soldier, public servant and wood-carver, and brother of the noted garden designer, writer and artist, Gertrude Jekyll. They lived at Munstead House in Surrey.

Their children were:

1. Barbara Freyberg, Baroness Freyberg, GBE, DStJ (1887–1973); married first, in 1911, to the Hon. Francis McLaren, M.P. (killed 1917 in the Great War); secondly, in 1922, to Colonel B. C. Freyberg, V.C., later Lord Freyberg (1889–1963), and had issue by both husbands.
2. Pamela Margaret (1889–1943); married 1908 the Right Hon. Reginald McKenna (died 1943), and had issue.
3. Francis Walter Jekyll (1882–1965); commemorated on the Jekyll family memorial at Busbridge Church, Surrey, England.

== Damehood ==
Agnes, Lady Jekyll was created a Dame Commander of the Order of the British Empire (DBE) in 1918 for her public works.

== Career ==
She first published Kitchen Essays (1922) in The Times, reprinted in 2001 by Persephone Books.

== Additional images ==
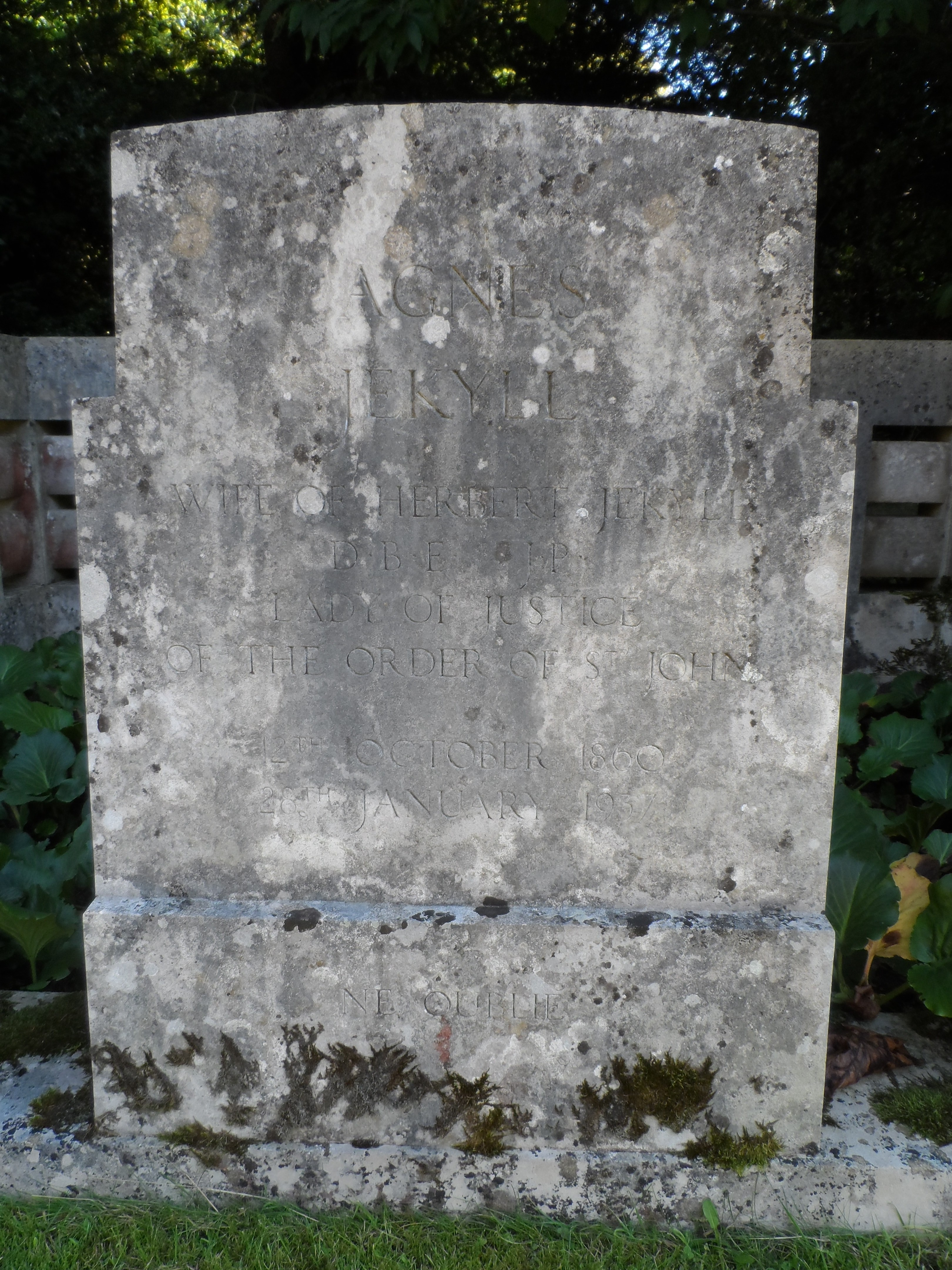
Agnes Jekyll's gravestone

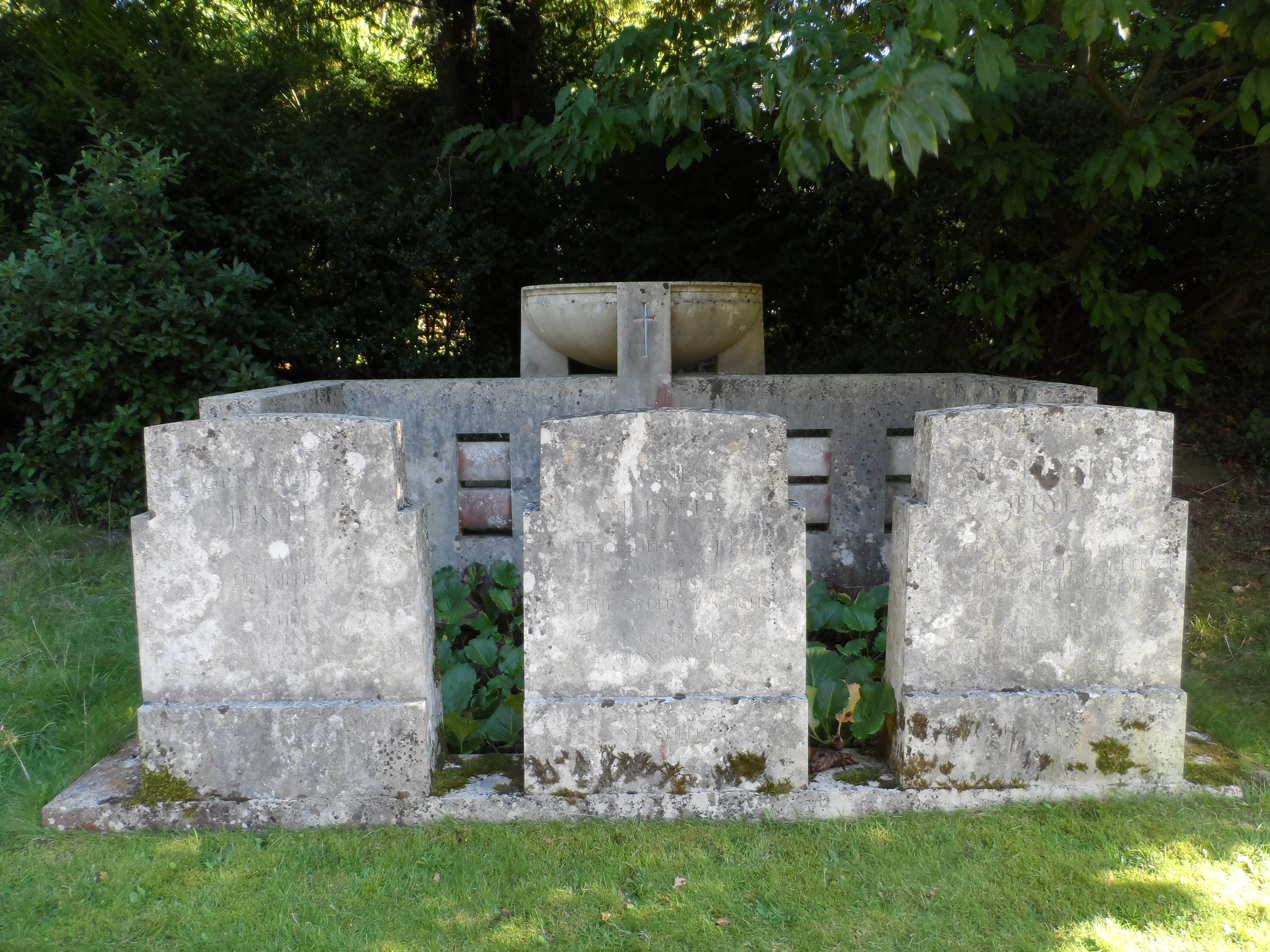
Jekyll family memorial in Busbridge churchyard

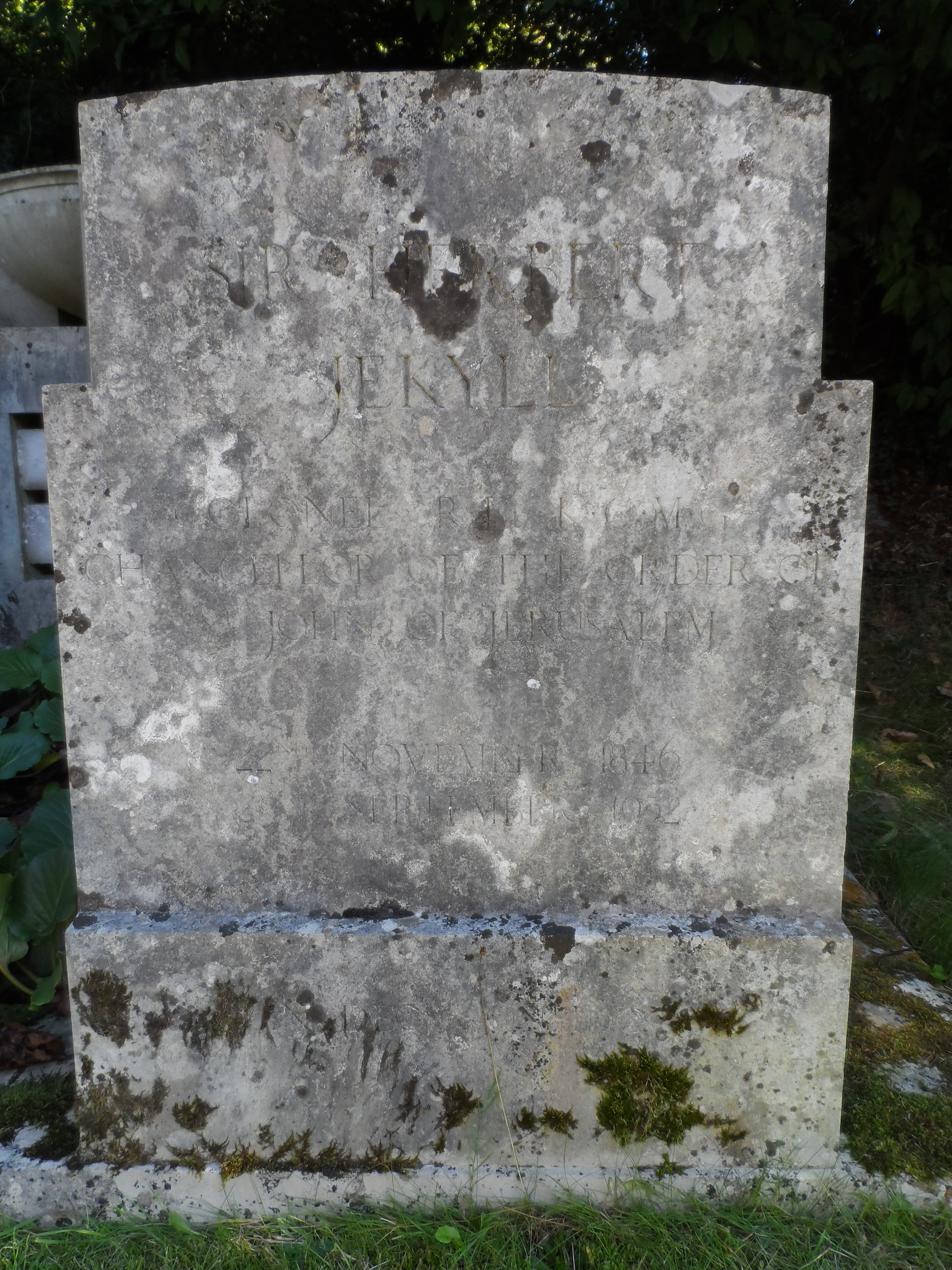
Herbert Jekyll's gravestone
