= Gertrude Jekyll =

British garden designer and writer

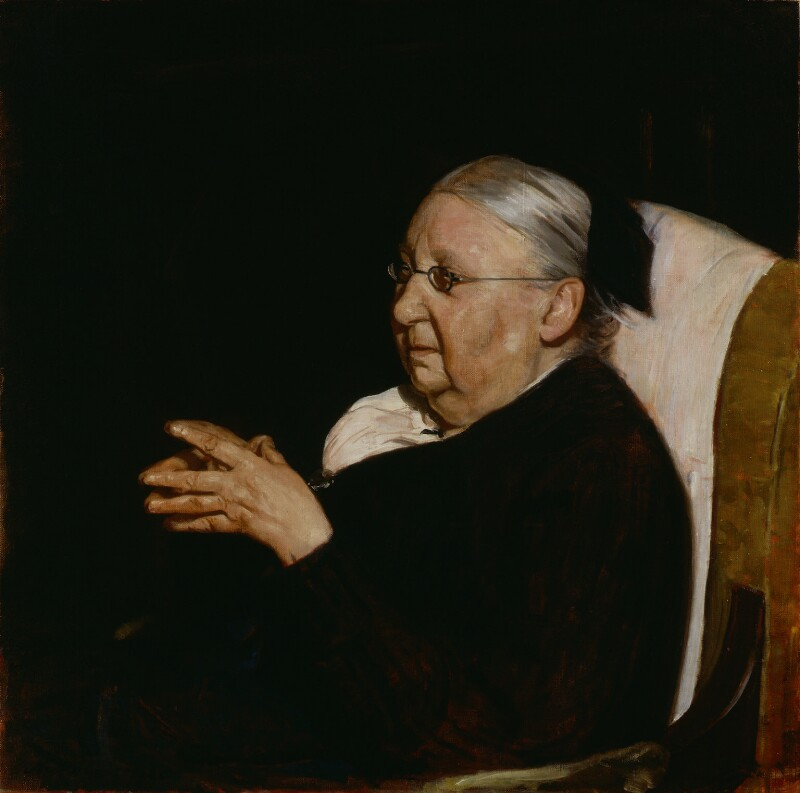
- Portrait of Jekyll by William Nicholson, October 1920
- Born: 29 November 1843; Mayfair, London, England
- Died: 8 December 1932 (aged 89); Munstead Wood, Surrey, England
- Occupations: Horticulturist; garden designer; photographer; writer and artist

Gertrude Jekyll VMH (/ˈdʒiːkəl/ JEE-kəl; 29 November 1843 – 8 December 1932) was a British horticulturist, garden designer, craftswoman, photographer, writer and artist. She created over 400 gardens in the United Kingdom, Europe and the United States, and wrote over 1000 articles for magazines such as Country Life and William Robinson's The Garden. Jekyll has been described as "a premier influence in garden design" by British and American gardening enthusiasts.

== Early life ==
Jekyll was born at 2 Grafton Street, Mayfair, London, the fifth of the seven children of Captain Edward Joseph Hill Jekyll, Esquire, an officer in the Grenadier Guards, and his wife Julia, née Hammersley. In 1848 her family left London and moved to Bramley House in Surrey. Gertrude’s education was at home, but it included meeting various well-known figures such as Michael Faraday and Felix Mendelssohn. She started sketching and gardening at Bramley House, and in 1861 she went to the National School of Art, South Kensington. Her paintings were exhibited at the Royal Academy and the Society of Female Artists. In 1863, she went with Charles and Mary Newton to Greece and Turkey, which stimulated a life-long interest in Mediterranean plants.

Her siblings were also interested gardeners – her sister Caroline in Italy and her younger brother, Walter Jekyll, in Jamaica. Walter, sometime Minor Canon of Worcester Cathedral and Chaplain of Malta, was a friend of Robert Louis Stevenson, who borrowed the family name for his 1886 novella Strange Case of Dr Jekyll and Mr Hyde.

== Career ==
In 1868 the Jekylls moved again, this time to Wargrave Hill, Berkshire. The following year, she got to know William Morris, and was profoundly influenced by his idea of the unity of the arts. During the 1870s, she turned her hand to all sorts of arts and crafts, from embroidering tablecloths to smithing gates, and designing both interiors and gardens. She also continued to collect plants during trips to the Mediterranean.

In 1881, Jekyll started writing for William Robinson’s magazine, The Garden. Following her father’s death in 1876, Gertrude’s mother commissioned a house in Munstead Heath near Godalming from John James Stevenson, Gertrude herself designing the garden. Jekyll, who never married, lived with her mother until 1895, when she built a house over the way. This was Munstead Wood, designed by Edwin Lutyens, the first of their house-and-garden collaborations. She established a nursery here, from which she supplied her garden designs. In 1904, Jekyll returned to her childhood home in the village of Bramley to design a garden for Millmead House in Snowdenham Lane.

Jekyll continued to write for various gardening magazines and journals, and for Country Life, and she published her first book, Wood and Garden, in 1899. In 1908, she published her best-seller, Colour in the Flower Garden. Jekyll was also interested in traditional cottage furnishings and rural crafts, and concerned that they were disappearing. Her book Old West Surrey (1904) records many aspects of 19th-century country life, with over 300 photographs taken by Jekyll herself.

== Themes ==
Jekyll was one half of one of the most influential and historical partnerships of the Arts and Crafts movement, thanks to her association with the English architect Edwin Lutyens, for whose projects she created numerous landscapes. (In 1900, Lutyens and Jekyll's brother Herbert designed the British Pavilion for the Paris Exposition.)

Jekyll is remembered for her outstanding designs and subtle, painterly approach to the arrangement of the gardens she created, particularly her "hardy flower borders". Her work is known for its radiant colour and the brush-like strokes of her plantings; it is suggested by some that the Impressionistic-style schemes may have been due to Jekyll's deteriorating eyesight, which largely put an end to her career as a painter and watercolourist. Her artistic ability had been evident when she was a child and she had trained as an artist, and she also collaborated with Minnie Walters Anson.

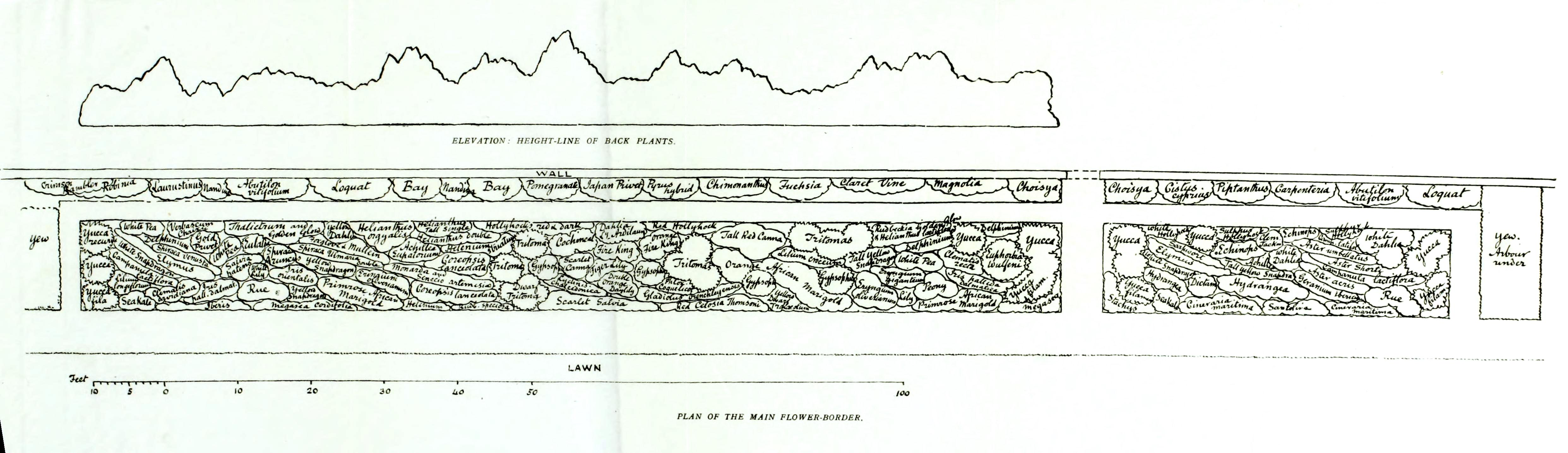
Jekyll's plan of the main flower-border at Munstead

She was one of the first of her profession to take into account the colour, texture, and experience of gardens as aspects of her designs. Jekyll's theory of how to design with colour was influenced by painter J. M. W. Turner and by Impressionism, and by the theoretical colour wheel. Her focus on gardening began at South Kensington School of Art, where she became interested in the creative art of planting, and more specifically, gardening.

Not wanting to limit her influence to teaching the practice of gardening, Jekyll incorporated in her work the theory of gardening and an understanding of the plants themselves. Her writing was influenced by her friend Theresa Earle who had published her "Pot-pourri" books. In works like Colour Schemes for the Flower Garden (reprinted 1988) she put her imprint on modern uses of "warm" and "cool" flower colours in gardens. Her concern that plants should be displayed to best effect even when cut for the house, led her to design her own range of glass flower vases.

Later in life, Jekyll collected and contributed a vast array of plants solely for the purpose of preservation to numerous institutions across Britain. At the time of her death, she had designed over 400 gardens in Britain, Europe and a few in North America.

== Gardens ==
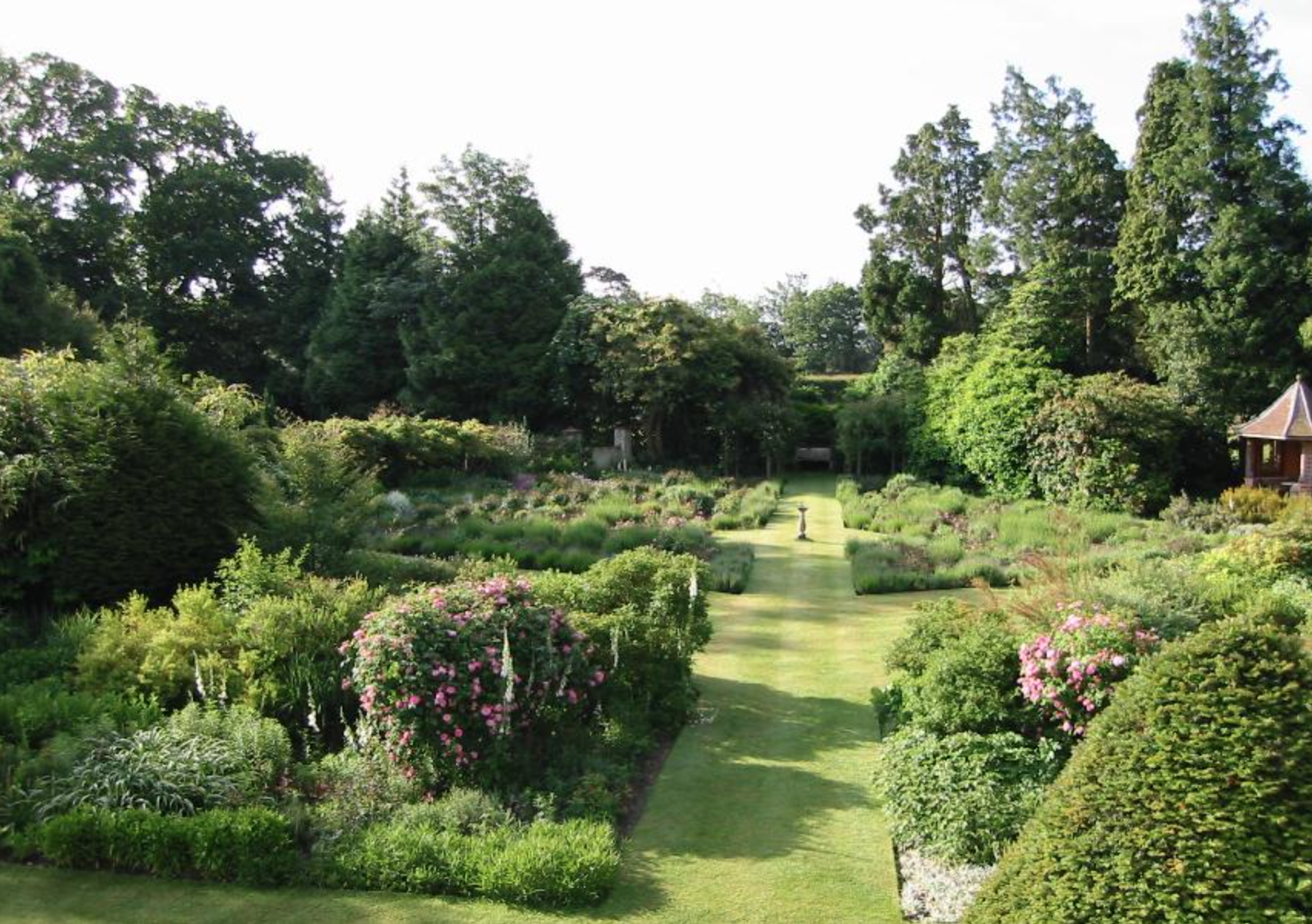
Durmast House and Gardens

From 1881, when she laid out the gardens for Munstead House, Jekyll provided designs or planned planting for some four hundred gardens. More than half were directly commissioned, but many were created in collaboration with architects such as Lutyens and Robert Lorimer. Most of her gardens are lost. A small number have been restored, including her own garden at Munstead Wood, the gardens of Hestercombe House and The Croft in Brook, Surrey, and those of Woolverstone House and the Manor House in Upton Grey that she designed for the magazine editor Charles Holme. Jekyll designed the plans at Durmast House and Gardens and this has recently been restored, including a Summer House designed by Lutyens.

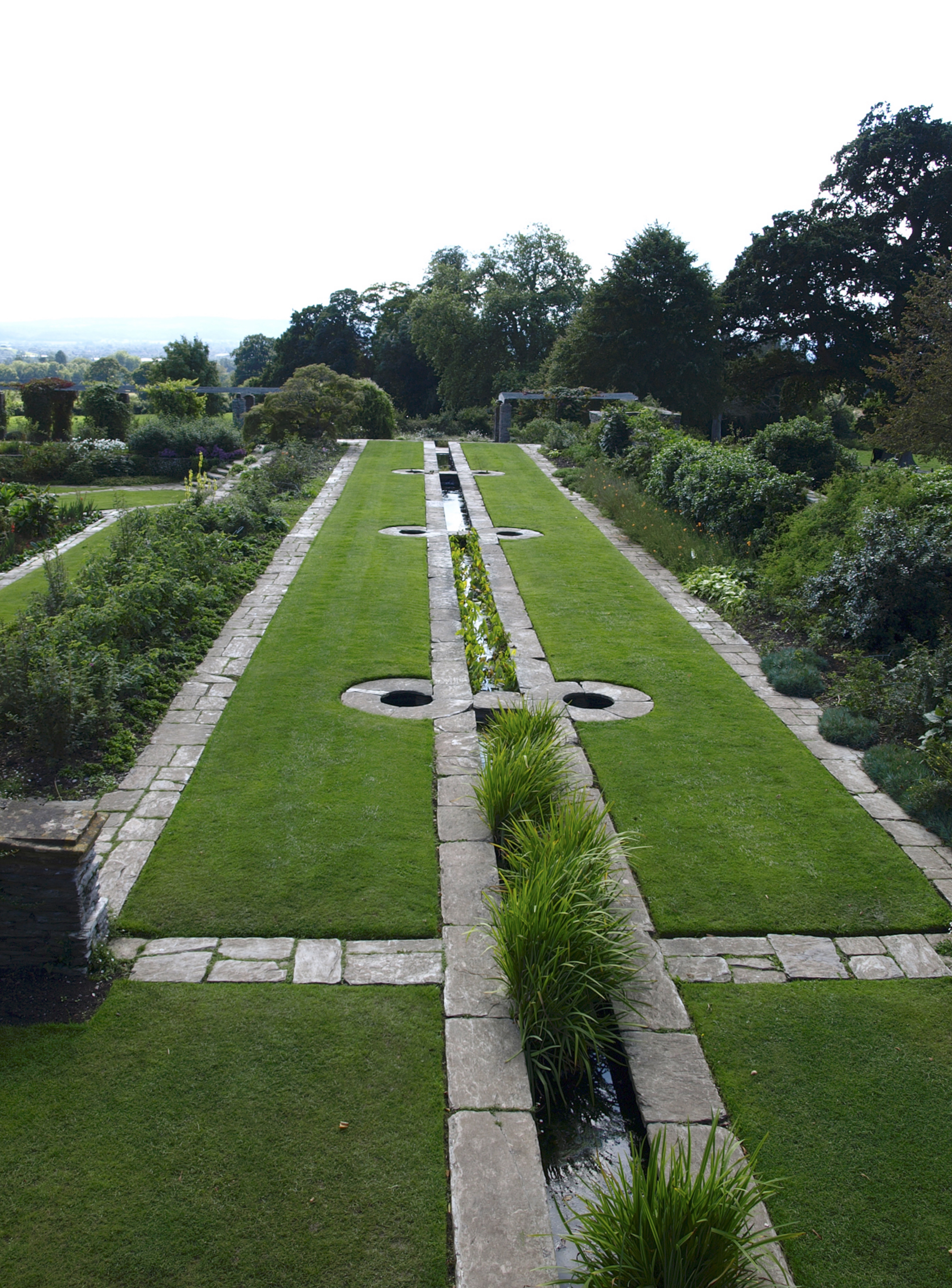
The West Rill at Hestercombe Gardens, 1904

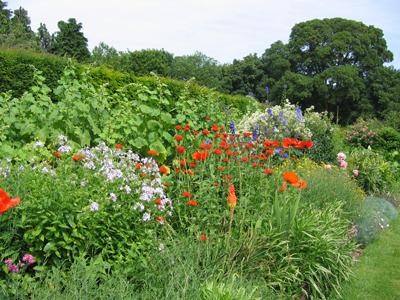
Jekyll's restored long border at Upton Grey Manor House, Hampshire

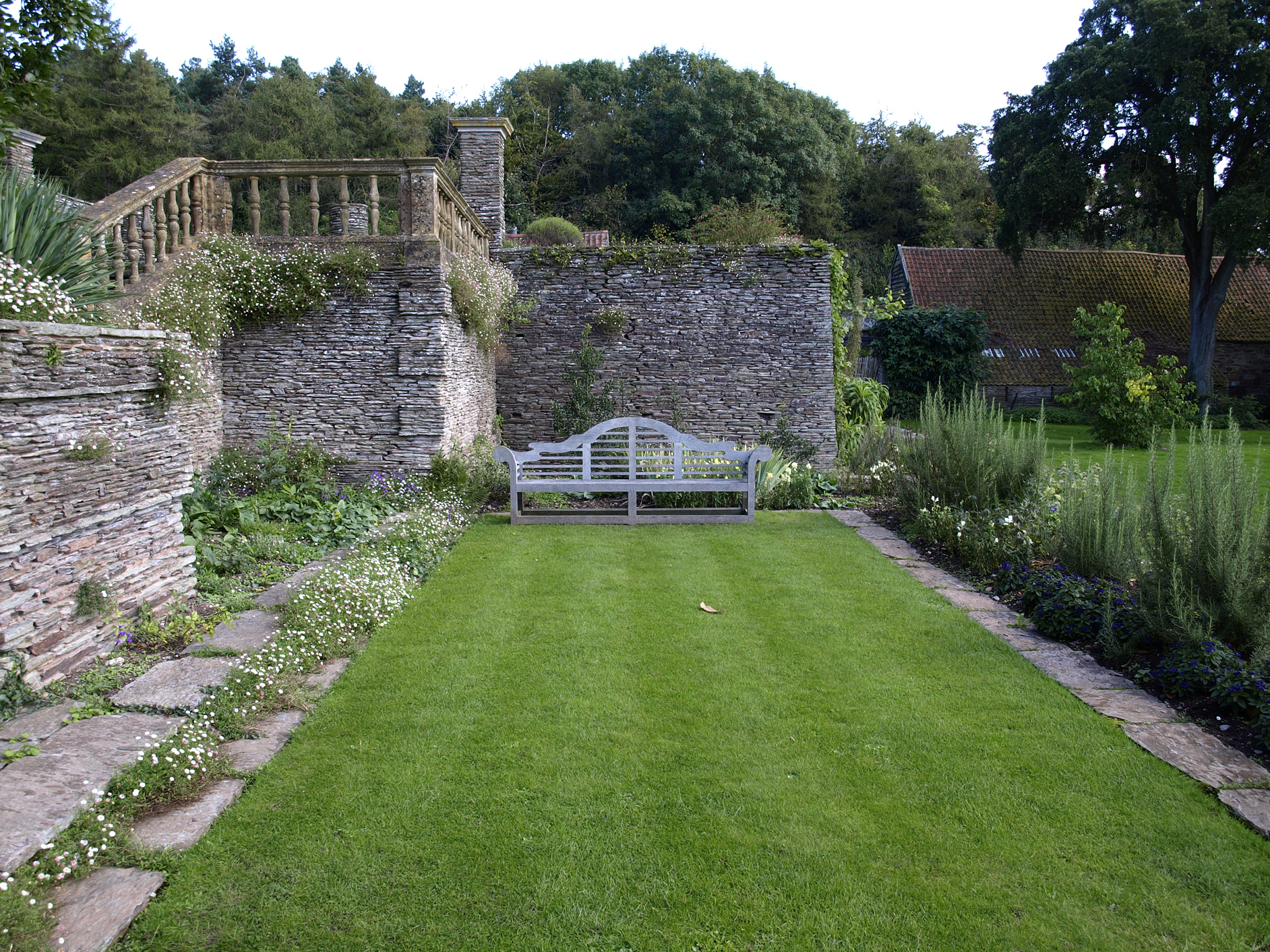
Hestercombe Gardens, the Lutyens-designed bench

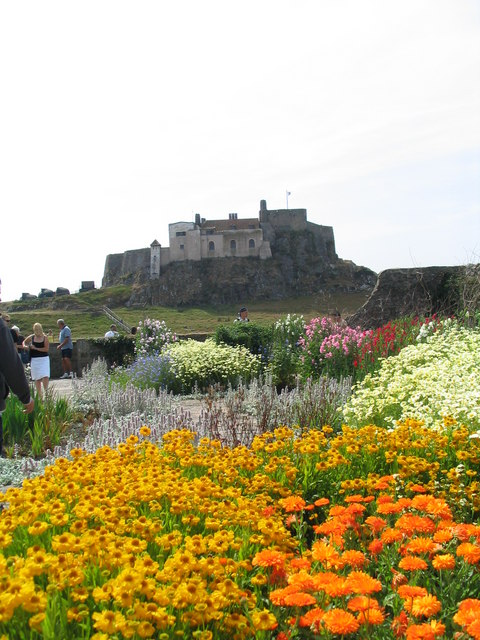
Lindisfarne Castle

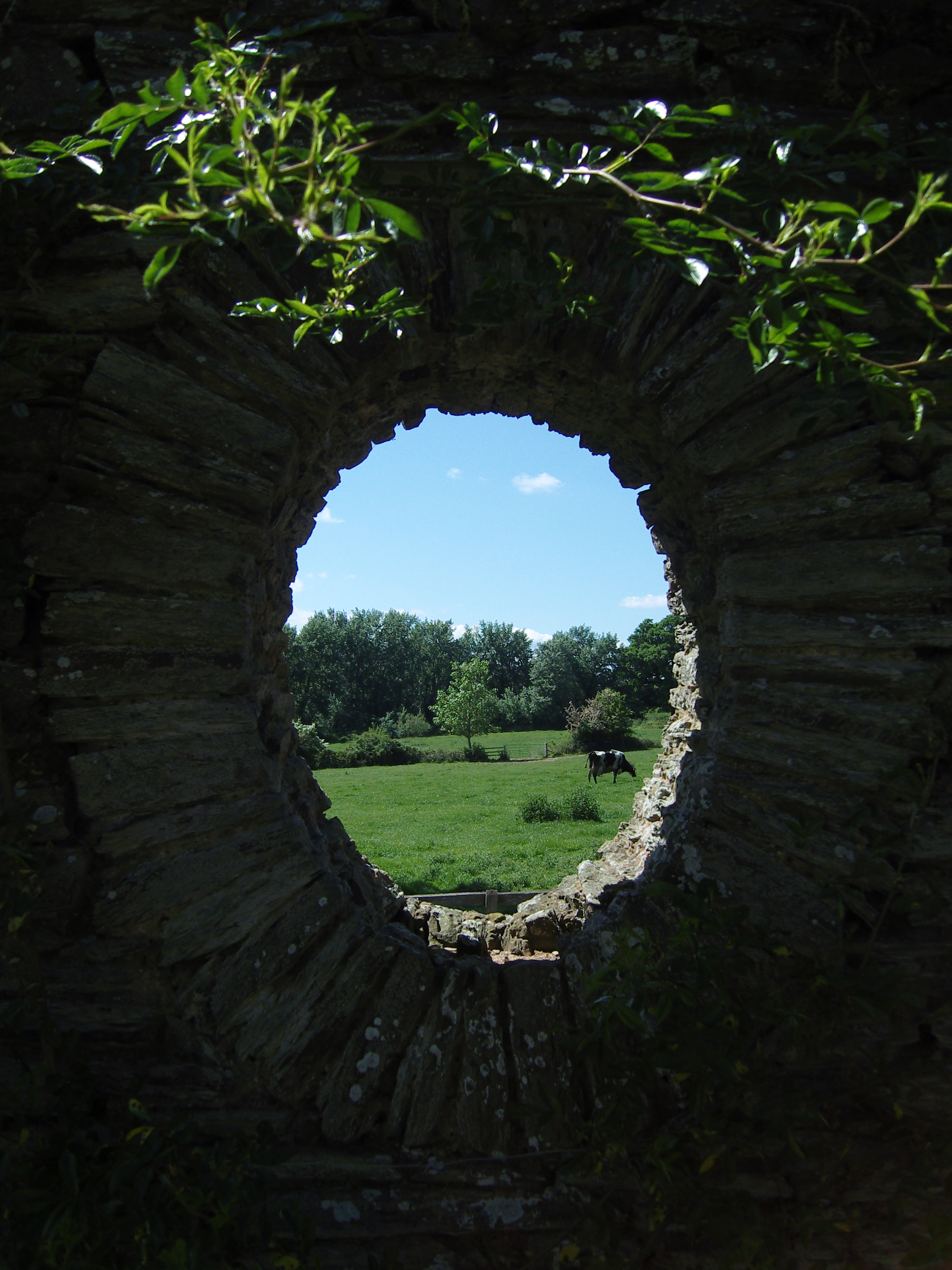
Hestercombe Gardens, borrowed scenery

== Awards ==
Jekyll was awarded the Victoria Medal of Honour of the Royal Horticultural Society in 1897 and the Veitch Memorial Medal of the society in 1929. Also in 1929, she was given the George Robert White Medal of Honor of the Massachusetts Horticultural Society.

== Death and burial ==
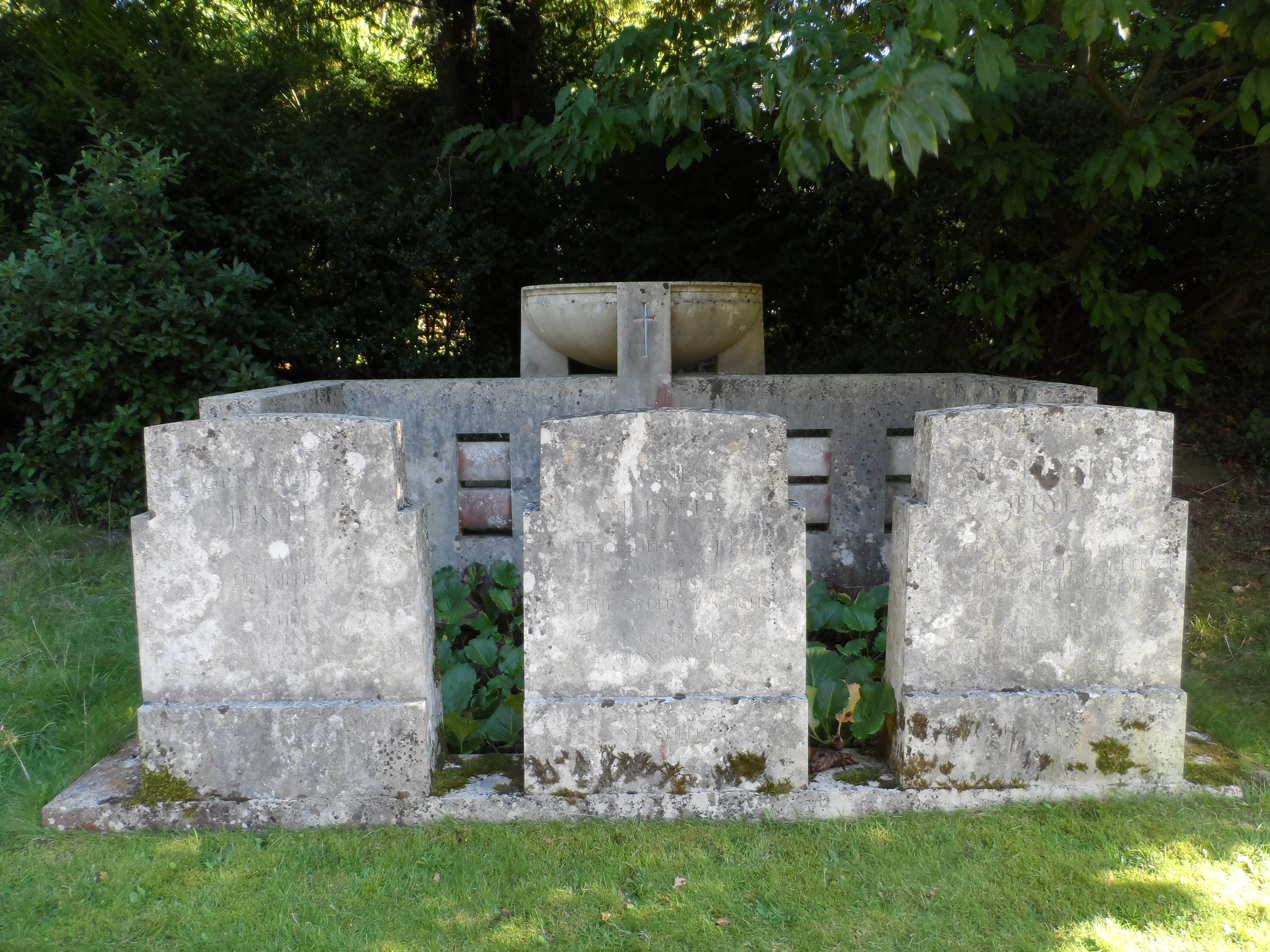
The Jekyll Memorial in Busbridge churchyard

Jekyll died on 8 December 1932 at her home, Munstead Wood, in Surrey. She was buried in the churchyard of St John the Baptist, Busbridge, Godalming, next to her brother, Herbert Jekyll, and his wife, the artist, writer and philanthropist Dame Agnes Jekyll. The Jekyll family memorial was designed by Edwin Lutyens.

== Legacy ==
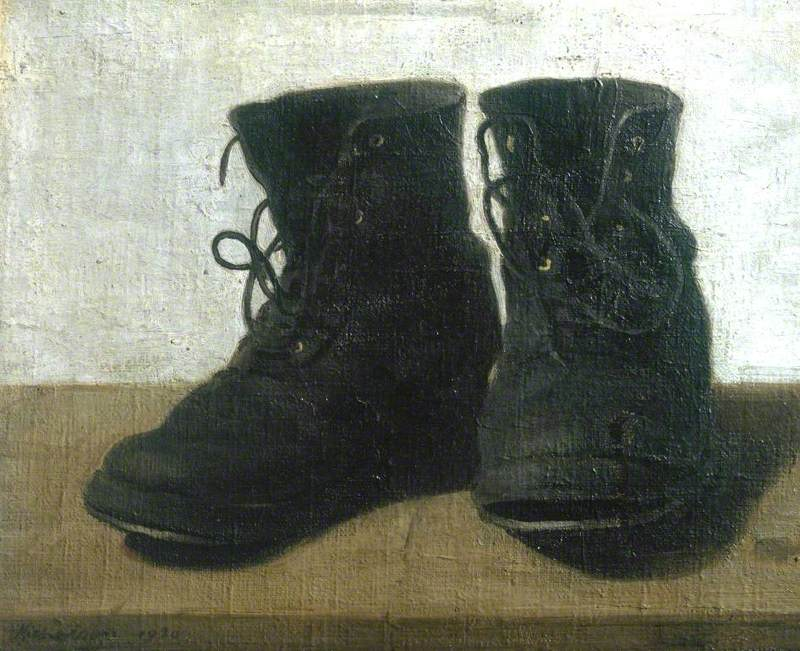
"Miss Jekyll's Boots" (1920) by William Nicholson

In 1907, Jekyll donated her collection of traditional household items and objects relating to "Old Surrey" to the Surrey Archaeological Society. Much of this donation is still on display at Guildford Museum. In 1911, the Corporation of Guildford built an extension to the museum to house the collection. Some artefacts associated with her life and work are also housed there.

In 1986, David Austin Roses introduced a rose cultivar named after Jekyll.

On 29 November 2017, a Google Doodle was released honouring Jekyll on what would have been her 174th birthday.

In 2023, the National Trust bought her home Munstead Wood through a private sale.

== Books ==
- Wood and Garden (Longmans, Green and Co., 1899).
- Home and Garden (Longmans, Green and Co., 1900).
- (with E. Mawley) Roses for English Gardens (London: Country Life, 1902).
- Wall and Water Gardens (London: Country Life, 1902).
- Lilies for English Gardens (London: Country Life, 1903).
- (with illustrations by George S. Elgood) Some English Gardens (Longmans, Green & Co., 1904)
- Old West Surrey (Longmans, Green, and Co., 1904).
- Colour in the Flower Garden (London: Country Life, 1908).
- Annuals & Biennials (London: Country Life, 1916)
- Children and Gardens (London: Country Life, 1908).
- (with Lawrence Weaver) Gardens for Small Country Houses (London: Country Life, 1914).
- Colour Schemes for the Flower Garden (London: Country Life, 1919).
- Old English Household Life (Batsford, 1925).

== See also ==
- The Bois des Moutiers (she designed some gardens of the Bois des Moutiers)
- Garden design
- Ralph Hancock (landscape gardener)
- Hascombe Court (designed by Jekyll)
- History of gardening
- Planting design
- Garden of Eden, Venice, the garden of Jekyll's sister Caroline
- Hestercombe Gardens
