= Herbert Cowley =

British botanist, journalist and photographer

- Born: 1885
- Died: November 1967 (aged 81–82); Newton Abbot, Devon, England

Herbert Cowley (1885 – November 1967) was a British botanist, gardener, garden photographer and garden writer who edited The Garden journal from 1915 to the mid-1920s. He wrote many gardening books until retiring in 1936.

Cowley was a member of the Kew Guild and active in the Kew Guild for Old Kewites, former and serving Kew Gardens staff. He also edited the Kew Guild Journal. After four years as journal editor or sub-editor from 1909 to 1914 and military service from 1914 to 1915, he became editor of The Garden in 1915/16 and carried on as a gardening writer until around 1936.

== Early life ==
His father Henry Cowley (died 3 April 1930 at Easton, Portland, Dorset) was a "domestic gardener" on Census records. Father Henry and mother Mary Ann Cowley are listed as living in Wantage, Berkshire, in the 1920s. Herbert worked at Lockinge Gardens in Berkshire before studying at Swanley College for two years, one of the last eight male students before it became a female horticultural college around 1902. He worked for the royal garden at Frogmore and after Swanley for Veitch Nurseries at Feltham.

Cowley joined the staff of Kew Gardens, eventually settling in the Orchid department in 1905. He was involved in Kew's Mutual Improvement Lectures in the 1906/07 season. Sadly, this pre-war lecture lists contain the names of some of other Kew staff including C. F. Ball, who would soon be killed on active service.

His Kew Guild Journal obituary in 1968 mentions prewar plant hunting trips to the Dolomites and a notable visit to Bulgaria as a guest of King Ferdinand, in the company of Kew contemporary C. F. Ball of the Royal Botanic Gardens, Glasnevin, in Dublin. Ball was killed as a private in the Royal Dublin Fusiliers on 13 September 1915 as part of the Gallipoli campaign. Ball's obituary in The Garden was written by his Kew contemporary and editor friend Cowley.

Cowley left Kew around 1907 to join The Gardener magazine as a subeditor (later called Popular Gardening). Herbert Cowley became Assistant Editor or Sub-Editor at a different title, The Garden in 1910. This was the magazine he was to return to as Editor after military service in 1915/6 until c. 1926. Cowley then edited Gardening Illustrated from 1923 to 1926. He appears also to have written garden articles for Country Life after 1911. He also worked (probably in the late 1920s) for Wallace & Co of Tunbridge Wells, nursery-men and landscape architects. He wrote his final book The Garden Year at Tunbridge Wells in 1936.

== Military service and family casualties WW1 ==
Herbert Cowley's army records reveal that he enlisted early in the war on 7 September 1914 as No. 2477 in the 12th County of London Regiment, known as the "London Rangers" or "Polytechnic Corps". He had quickly embarked for Belgium by 25 December 1914. In one of Herbert Cowley's postwar letters in his National Archives British Army Service records, he complains to the Army authorities in 1920 from his residence at Curley Croft, Lightwater, near Bagshot:

"I have received so far no medals whatsover for services rendered at the Front in 1914/15. I was in the 12th London Regiment and went to Belgium with the 1st Battalion on Christmas Eve."

Cowley would eventually be awarded the Pip, Squeak and Wilfred trio of medals for soldiers who served early in the First World War. He was also awarded the Silver War Badge by 1916, a useful public symbol that showed others he had been injured and demobilised. Cowley had got what was known as a "Blighty" wound, serious enough to get him invalided out of the army but one that allowed him to live an active life.

"Our Sub-Editor at the Front", Cowley is recorded in the 1916 Kew Guild Journal as being "wounded twice" in the spring battles of Ypres in 1915. He was slightly wounded in late April 1915, reported in The Garden of 8 May 1915:

"For the past eight days we have been in severe battle. I am slightly wounded by shell - only a bruised rib and am in hospital. Dreadful warfare is still raging ... we must win!"

He was more seriously wounded on 4 May 1915, receiving a GSW Right Knee (either gunshot wound or shrapnel wound). The circumstances are reported in The Garden on 15 May 1915:

"Rifleman H. Cowley 2477,... has again been wounded in action and is now in hospital ... Surgical 7, 3rd Southern General Hospital, Oxford ... wounded in the knee whilst bandaging another soldier in the trenches ..."

Cowley was lucky to be alive, if injured, after this action at Ypres. The fighting by his 1st Battalion, 12th London Regiment on the Frezenberg Ridge in the Second Battle of Ypres "brought about the end of the original battalion", with only 53 of his original battalion comrades survived unscathed. This battalion had also been involved in the first German poison gas attack on 22 April 1915.

His family were also affected by the war. Herbert's older brother Lance Corporal Henry William Cowley died while training on military service in the 26th Reserve Training Battalion a cerebral haemorrhage on 14 September 1917 at Napsbury Hospital, St Albans, leaving a wife and three children. His other brother Charles Cowley (b. 1890, Wantage, Berks - d. 1973, New Zealand) served in the same regiment as Cowley from 1915 and became a Sergeant but was invalided out with trench foot to become a musketry instructor in Devon. His wife Elsie Mabel (née Hurst) lost her 30-year-old brother Rifleman 4278 Percy Haslewood (or Hazlewood) Hurst of the 1st /16th Battalion, London Regiment (Queen's Westminster Rifles), who was killed on 1 July 1916, the first day of Battle of the Somme, during his battalion's diversionary attack on Gommecourt.

== Life after military service ==
In late 1915 Cowley was invalided out of the Army, recovering from wounds and married Elsie Mabel Hurst on 8 December 1915 in Kingston, Surrey. Cowley very quickly returned his gardening and writing work to produce many books of practical, no-nonsense advice for the gardening enthusiast, Vegetable Growing in Wartime 1917, in his own way contributing to the war effort in the First World War's version of Dig for Victory.

The tone of his editorials in The Garden was increasingly about the need for practical food production. Bad harvests and the increasing German submarine attacks on merchant shipping were causing shortages, price rises and uncertainty over future supply. Rationing was introduced in Britain in late 1917.

Herbert Cowley continued to practical small pamphlets on Storing Vegetables and Fruit (1918), Cultivation with Movable Frames (1920) and a short book on The Modern Rock Garden (still in print). His largest book, The Garden Year appeared in 1936, when his garden journalism career appears to end.

Cowley was still energetically going abroad in his fifties, despite his shrapnel wounds, leading trips to the Swiss Alps in 1936. In 1947 he went on a plant collecting visit to Spain accompanied by the president of the British Alpine Society, Paul Giuseppi, and a student, Vernon Heywood who would later be a leader in plant taxonomy and conservation. Alpine plants were to remain a passion of Herbert Cowley to the end of his life in 1968. He was an honorary life member of the British Alpine Society.

== Friendship with Gertrude Jekyll ==
Many of the famous postwar photographs of Miss Gertrude Jekyll and Jekyll's Munstead Wood are attributed to Cowley. Cowley had a long working relationship with Gertrude Jekyll, to whom she records her thanks in A Gardening Companion:

"and lastly to her devoted friend and colleague, Mr. Herbert Cowley, editor of The Gardening Illustrated during the period of her contribution to it, for many of the photographs which materially enhance such value as this book may possess."

== Life during and after WW2 ==
According to an obituary article in the Western Guardian on 9 November 1967, Cowley left journalism c. 1936 to 1940 to move to Withypool on Exmoor to run a riding school for 20 years up to the late 1950s. Cowley and his wife made a final move to the Brixham area in the early 1960s, growing camellias, nerines and alpine plants. His Kew Guild Journal 1968 obituary notes that he was survived by his wife Elsie (b. 1893? – d. 1969) and a son.

Cowley's unexpected move to the West Country and retirement from journalism may be explained by the death of one of his children in September 1940 during World War II. One of his sons, RAF Sergeant Observer Robert Hurst Cowley, 580643, died aged 22 on 2 September 1940 flying with 57 Squadron on Blenheim bombers on anti-shipping patrols over the North Sea from its base in Elgin in Scotland. Robert is listed on the Commonwealth War Graves Commission (CWGC) website as the "son of Herbert & Elsie Mabel Cowley of East Grinstead, Sussex". Robert Hurst Cowley has no known grave and is commemorated on panel 13 of the Runnymede Memorial to missing aircrew. Robert is also listed on the St. Thomas a Becket Church, Framfield, on the War Memorial as "of this parish".

== Books ==
- Vegetable Growing in Wartime. Country Life Publishing. 1917.
- Storing Vegetables and Fruit. Country Life. 1918.
- Cultivation with Movable Frames. Country Life. 1920.
- The Modern Rock Garden. 1920s.
- The Garden Year. 1936.
