= Munstead and Tuesley =

Civil parish in Surrey, England

Coordinates: 51°10′29″N 0°35′42″W

- Civil parish
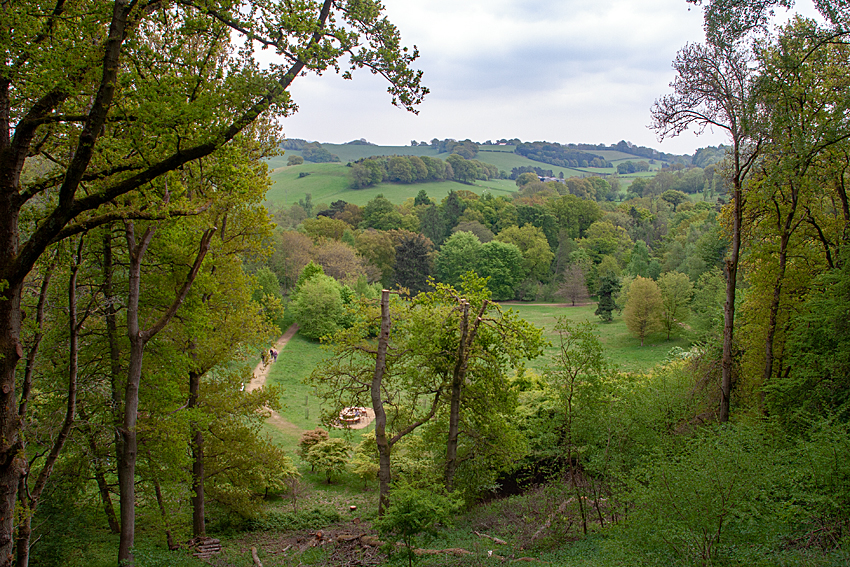
- Winkworth Arboretum in spring

- Location within Surrey
- Civil parish: Munstead and Tuesley
- District: Waverley
- Shire county: Surrey
- Region: South East
- Country: England
- Sovereign state: United Kingdom
- Post town: GODALMING
- Postcode district: GU8
- Dialling code: 01483
- Police: Surrey
- Fire: Surrey
- Ambulance: South East Coast
- UK Parliament: Godalming and Ash
- Website: www.munstead-tuesley-pc.org

Munstead and Tuesley is a civil parish in the Waverley district, in Surrey, England, within the Surrey Hills National Landscape. The parish was formed from the former parish of Busbridge after the village itself became part of the parish of Godalming in 2024. The main road through the parish is the B2130 Hascombe Road. The most notable location in the area is Winkworth Arboretum, owned and maintained by the National Trust since 1952.

== Munstead Heath ==
This sparsely populated bulk of the parish has a minority of farmland but is otherwise part of the remaining area of The Weald, forming much of the green buffers between settlements in the south of the county.

A small triangular park, Munstead Wood extends from the heath a small way into one of Godalming's outer six suburban localities, Holloway Hill. This is Grade I listed in the park and gardens category, containing Gertrude Jekyll's landscaped woodland home, also called Munstead Wood. The house was designed by Edwin Lutyens and is Grade I listed.

South Munstead is a hamlet toward Hascombe.

== Busbridge Manor ==
James de Bushbridge sold Bushbridge or Busbridge to John Eliot of Godalming under Henry VIII. His son William, born 1587, was knighted in 1620 and built the old house of Busbridge, to judge from the features of the building, and formed the park, having a (royal) grant of free warren in his lands of 500 acres (200 ha) in 1637, and died 1650. The heirs were his son William (1624–1697) and then his grandsons William (1671–1708) and Laurence, who sailed with Drake on his round the world voyage, and who sold the property in 1710. Subsequently the house passed through many owners. Among these was Philip Carteret Webb, FRS, born 1702, M.P. for Haslemere 1754–67 and solicitor to the Treasury 1756–65. He was a distinguished lawyer, antiquary, and collector. He died at Busbridge in 1770. The poet, Chauncy Hare Townshend, was born at the house in 1798, his father having bought it two years earlier. By 1911 a Mr. P. Graham owned the property, having demolished the original house between 1906 and 1911, and replaced it with a new building in the early 20th century Edwardian style on another site.

Busbridge Lakes is a Grade II* listed landscape in the parks and garden category, listed for its man-made follies, grottos, clear lakes and wide range of trees. It covers an area of about 72 ha (180 acres) comprising 30 ha (74 acres) of formal gardens, pleasure grounds, and lakes surrounded by 42 ha (100 acres) of parkland. The lakes are The Canal, House Pond, Middle Lake, and Lower Lake. The last is owned by a private angling club and feeds into a pond known as the Lady Well. Busbridge Lakes House was converted from the original stable block when the old manor was demolished.

== Tuesley ==
Tuesley is the principal settlement in the parish and the location of Milford Hospital.

== Hydestile ==
A small settlement which straddles the boundary between Hambledon civil parish and Munstead and Tuesley. Hydestile includes Busbridge Court Farm. Hydon Hill, a Leonard Cheshire Disability hospice/retreat is in this part of the parish.
