= Roads Beautifying Association =

British charity (1928-c. 1950)

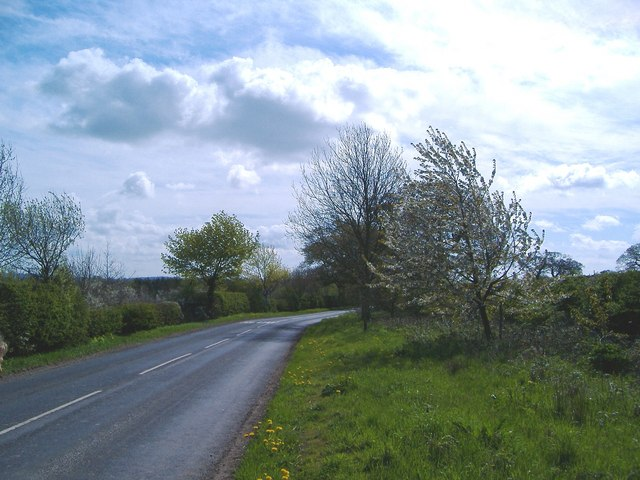
The Association was one of experts who advised on verges, the course, trees and shrubs that would remain safe and cheap to maintain in particular new road schemes and areas

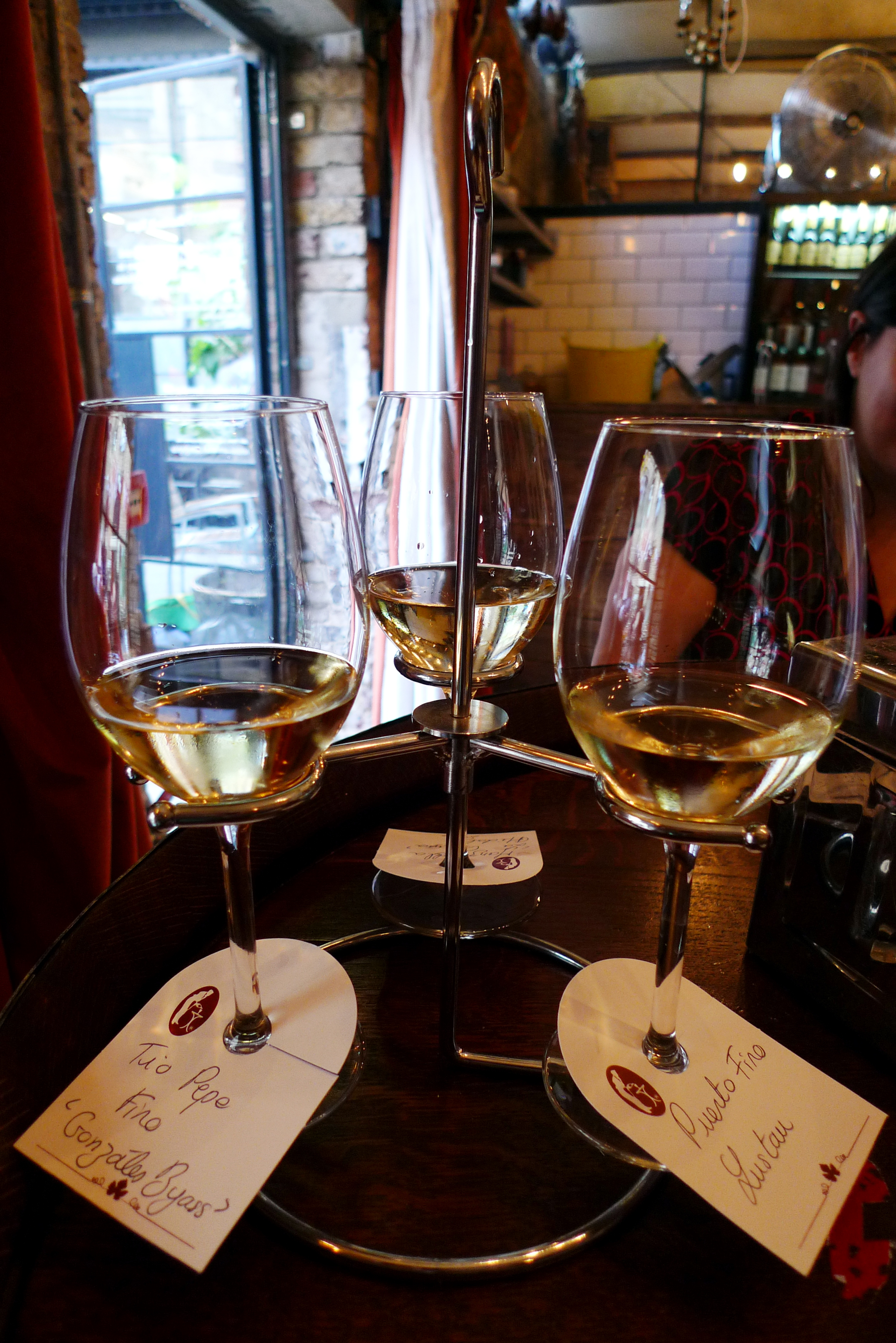
A 'rash' sherry party which members including the Duke of Devonshire attended, led to the advisory body's demise.

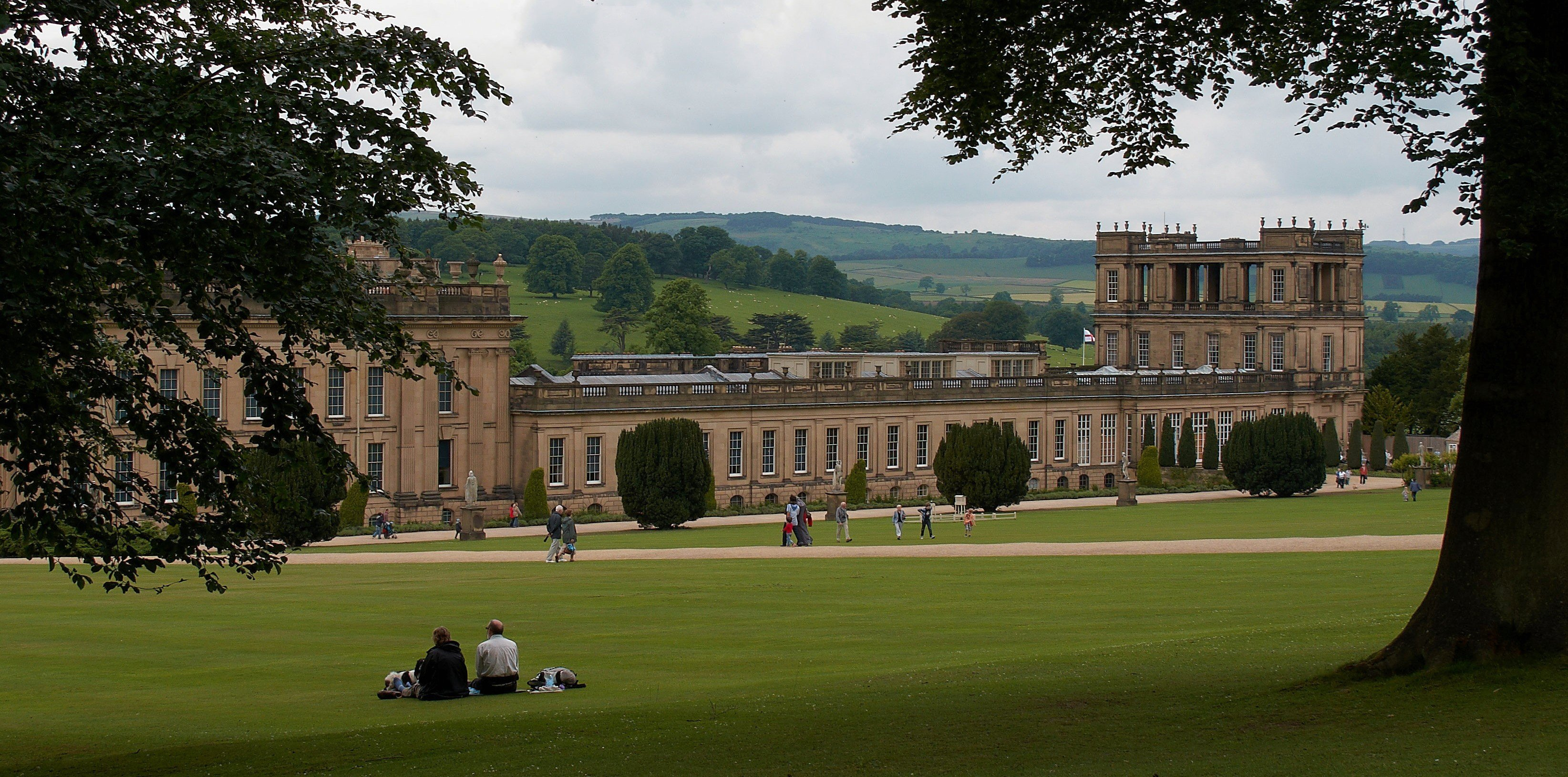
Chatsworth House was among many estates of England that the President of the Society owned and improved. He achieved wide cross-party recognition for work on his own estates and today the gardens including its above roof-height mountain-fed fountain jet are listed.

The Roads Beautifying Association (1928–c. 1950) was founded in the United Kingdom by Lord Mount Temple, the Minister of Transport in 1928 who appointed as its (Hon.) Secretary Dr. Wilfrid Fox who served throughout and whose work was praised on the organisation's demise by government and opposition alike.

The association had the aim of creating better planted and more aesthetically pleasing roads to accommodate cars around the United Kingdom. It published Roadside Planting in 1930. It contributed in biodiversity, overall layout and on safety grounds to many public works programs.

== Membership and activities ==
Its members were chosen for knowledge and experience and chiefly included: Lionel de Rothschild, who was chairman of the Royal Horticultural Society (RHS), Mr. F. R. S. Balfour, Sir Arthur Hill, Mr. W. J. Bean (author of Trees and Hardy Shrubs in the British Isles), Col. Stern who was expert on planting in chalky soils, Arthur Cotton, who was the keeper of the herbarium at RHS Kew Gardens and became President of the Linnean Society of London, Mr. Gardner, secretary of the English Forestry Association, Sir Charles Bressey, an eminent road engineer, from the mid 1930s Lord Aberconway, who became President of the RHS, Sir Edward James Salisbury, botanist and ecologist, Roy Robinson, 1st Baron Robinson, forester, and also representatives of the A.A., the R.A.C., the British Road Federation, representatives of Kew Gardens and, labelled as 'very important' by the last president (the 10th Duke of Devonshire)—a business of tree and other plant nurseries which invested its time and advised willingly.

The association had the aim of increasing the publicly maintainable biophysical environment around the new roads being built to accommodate cars around the United Kingdom, particularly along new roads and especially new trunk roads. It published Roadside Planting in 1930. It contributed aesthetically and on safety grounds to public works programs, funded by local authorities and central government.

The RBA went on for almost a decade on a self-promoted voluntary consultative basis, increasing its circle of contacts among local authorities and doing more and more work with only Ministerial best practice guidance to local authorities to consult it, until, in 1937 the Ministry gave it a grant for promoting its work of £200 a year and urged all local authorities to consult the RBA.

== Disbandment ==
The association, to advertise its existence and that its advice was available, held a sherry party to which it invited the Minister for Transport four years into the six-year Attlee Ministry. This was summarized by the bulk of the House of Lords' speech of the RBA President, The 10th Duke of Devonshire, Conservative:

As I watched the Association's sherry going down his throat, I almost saw the mental processes going on inside his mind. He was thinking, "This will not do at all. Here are people who know their jobs doing something for nothing. This might be of advantage to 'the boys.' It might be one of their 'rackets.'" Soon after that, out of the blue, with what I might call brutal rudeness, the Minister dismissed Dr. Fox. Dr. Fox had done a tremendous work over a period of twenty years, and had devoted his great knowledge and an enormous amount of time and energy to his job. The Minister spoke very disparagingly of the work of the Association and told us to get rid of him. He also told us that the small subsidy of £200 a year would be discontinued, and that local authorities would in future be told to come to the Ministry, which was setting up its own department to advise on road planting.

I want to ask the...Earl who is to reply what this service is costing. I understand that two officials are employed, at a cost of between £1,500 and £1,800 a year and they must have their own staff—clerks, secretaries, typists, draftsmen and so on—and any of us who have had any experience of Government affairs realise that the cost of that increases year by year. What is being spent now and what services are being obtained? I want to know why this sudden change of attitude took place. ...

They certainly did not like something about the Association. When we found we had been dismissed, Dr. Fox was greatly discouraged. We felt it was no good trying to fight the Government and the Minister, so we called a meeting to wind up the Association...unanimously rejected.

Since that time the County Councils' Association have repeatedly asked the Minister that the [RBA] might be kept in being, and have asked to consult that body instead of his officials. At first I thought it was a case of "a job for the boys," but I did the Government an injustice. They...gave it to a young man from Kew...who had done fifteen months' training at Kew before the war...a brilliant young man, but he could not get anything done because he was so tied up with red tape; and after a year he resigned and went back to Kew.

A new advisory body was to have been set up. ...Lord Aberconway, agreed to be chairman and we were to have some representation. From what I am told, this new body has never come into being, and, for reasons of economy, is being held in abeyance.

Now the [local authorities] have to go to an officer who cannot have the breadth of knowledge and accumulated experience which was available in the Association.

— The 10th Duke of Devonshire, President of the RBA and at the time a sitting Conservative

The 5th Earl of Listowel of the governing party—in a time of economic hardship replied:

My Lords, I am sure...the Duke need not apologise for drawing the attention of the House to this important work of road planting which, as [The Bishop of Truro ] has said, contributes so much to the beauty of the English countryside. I assure the...Duke that...the Minister is keenly interested in this work of road planting...

The Ministry of Transport has for a long time past—and indeed the...Duke bore witness to that in his remarks—been fully alive to the importance of providing suitable trees and shrubs, as well as grass verges, as part of the design of modern highways. This is desirable, not only to improve the appearance of the roads, to make them more attractive in themselves and to prevent them from clashing violently with the country landscapes through which they pass, but also from the point of view of road safety...

...improvement schemes which can be undertaken at the present time are limited to those which are of vital importance...

[The Minister] has reluctantly decided that expenditure from the Road Fund must be limited for the present to small schemes, mainly those which are essential for road safety. For example, there is no objection to the provision of shrubs on central margins which will prevent the risk of dazzle from the headlamps of motor vericles, or of boundary hedges for the safety of road users...to meet the Ministry's future requirements on trunk roads, a contract to the value of £4,373 was signed in 1948 for the supply of plants and trees from 1951 to 1957.

— The 5th Earl of Listowel (Lab)

== See also ==
- Road safety audit
- Town and country planning
