= Wilfrid Fox =

Wilfrid Fox (1875 – 22 May 1962) was a dermatologist in the United Kingdom. He practised at St George's Hospital, London.

He became passionately interested in the environment. He founded the Roads Beautifying Association in 1928.

He lived at Winkworth Farm, Busbridge, Surrey. In 1937, he acquired part of the adjoining Thorncombe Estate, and proceeded to create an arboretum.

In 1948, he was awarded the highest honour of the Royal Horticultural Society, the Victoria Medal of Honour. He gave part of the arboretum to the National Trust in 1952, and the trust later acquired more of the land. This is now open to the public as Winkworth Arboretum.
