= Winkworth Arboretum =

Arboretum in Surrey, England

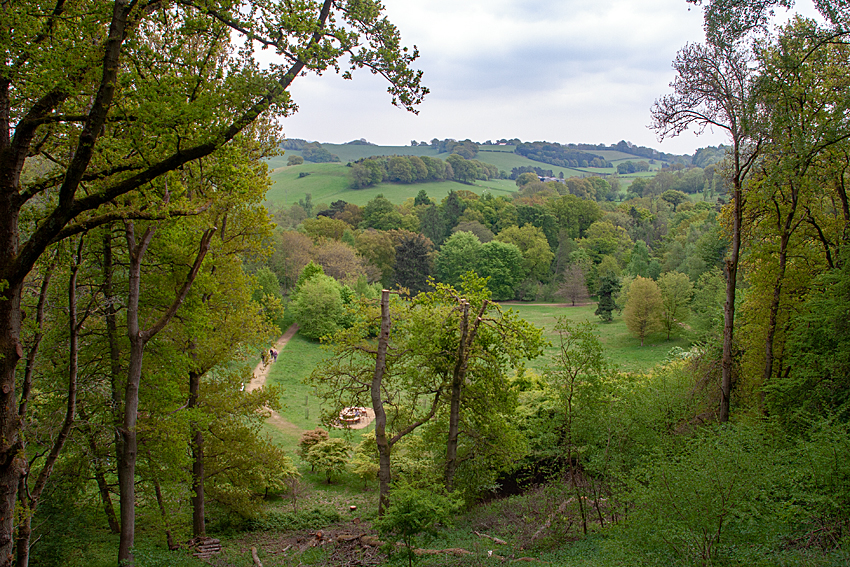
- Winkworth Arboretum in spring

- Location within Surrey
- Type: Arboretum
- Location: Munstead and Tuesley, Surrey
- Coordinates: 51°09′39″N 0°34′54″W
- Created: 1938-1952
- Operator: National Trust
- Designation: AAAP Level 2

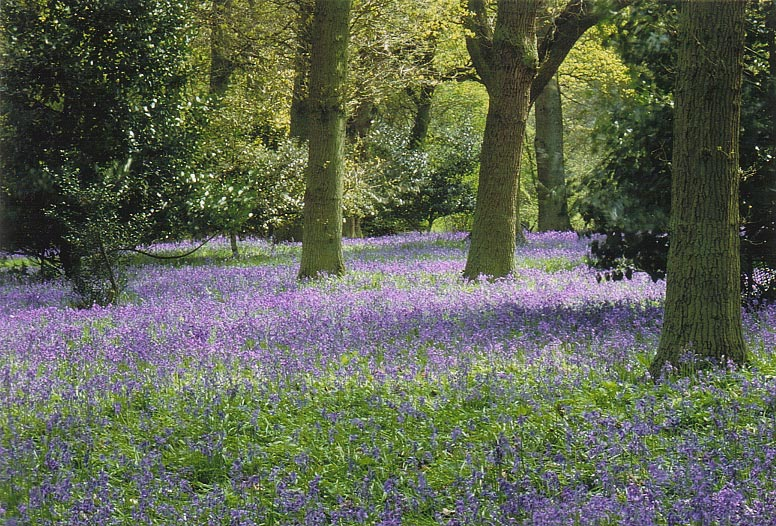
Winkworth with Spring bluebells

Winkworth Arboretum is a National Trust-owned arboretum in the civil parish of Munstead and Tuesley between Godalming and Hascombe, south-west Surrey, England.

The 95 acres (38 ha) arboretum was founded by Dr Wilfrid Fox, starting in 1938 and continuing through World War II. He cleared the land and planted it with carefully chosen trees and shrubs to maximise its autumnal appearance. Once it was established, he presented it to the National Trust in 1952.

Winkworth Arboretum exhibits over 1000 species of trees as well as large collections of azalea, rhododendron, and holly on slopes leading down to landscaped garden lakes.
