= Edwin Lutyens =

English architect (1869–1944)

Sir Edwin Lutyens OM KCIE PRA FRIBA
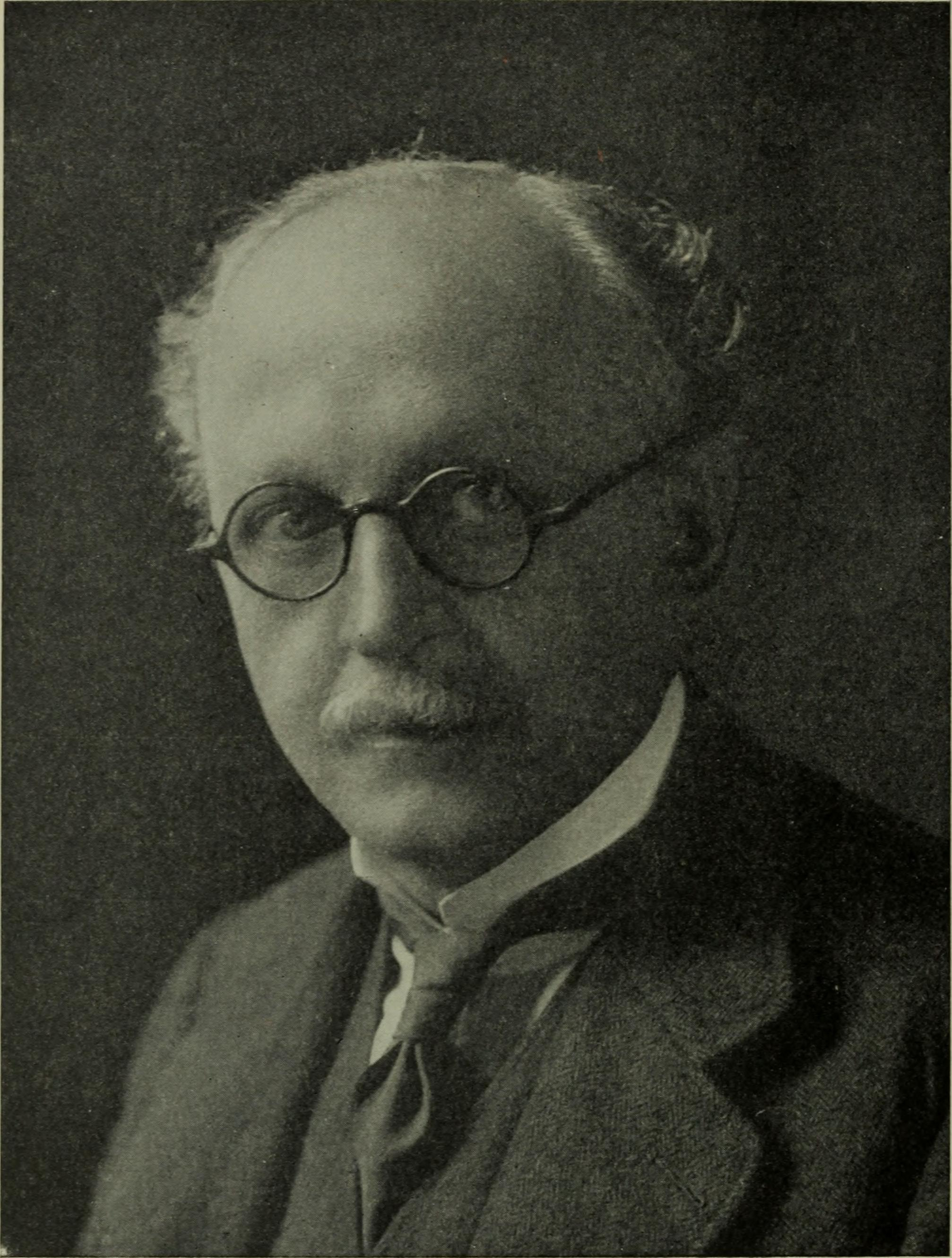
- Lutyens in 1921
- Born: Edwin Landseer Lutyens; 29 March 1869; Kensington, London, England, U.K.
- Died: 1 January 1944 (aged 74); Marylebone, London, England, U.K.
- Education: Royal College of Art
- Occupation: Architect
- Spouse: Lady Emily Bulwer-Lytton (m. 1897)
- Children: 5, including Robert, Elisabeth and Mary
- Parents: Charles Augustus Henry Lutyens; Mary Theresa Gallwey
- Buildings: Castle Drogo; India Gate; Thiepval Memorial; 100 King Street; The Cenotaph, Whitehall; Lindisfarne Castle; Rashtrapati Bhavan; Hyderabad House
- Projects: New Delhi

Sir Edwin Landseer Lutyens (/ˈlʌtjənz/ LUT-yənz; 29 March 1869 – 1 January 1944) was a British architect known for imaginatively adapting traditional architectural styles to the requirements of his era. He designed many English country houses, war memorials and public buildings. In his biography, the writer Christopher Hussey wrote, "In his lifetime (Lutyens) was widely held to be our greatest architect since Wren if not, as many maintained, his superior". The architectural historian Gavin Stamp described him as "surely the greatest British architect of the twentieth (or of any other) century".

Lutyens played an instrumental role in the construction of New Delhi, which would later on serve as the seat of the Government of India. In recognition of his contribution, a part of New Delhi is known as "Lutyens' Delhi". In collaboration with Sir Herbert Baker, he was also the main architect of several monuments in New Delhi such as the India Gate; he also designed the Viceroy's House, which is now known as the Rashtrapati Bhavan. Many of his works were inspired by Indian architecture. He was elected Master of the Art Workers' Guild in 1933.

== Early life ==
Lutyens was born in Kensington, London, was of English and Irish (British) descent, and was the tenth of thirteen children of Mary Theresa Gallwey (1832/33–1906) from Killarney, Ireland, and Captain Charles Augustus Henry Lutyens (1829–1915), an English soldier and painter. His sister, Mary Constance Elphinstone Lutyens (1868–1951), wrote novels under her married name of Mrs George Wemyss. He grew up in Thursley, Surrey. He was named after a friend of his father, the painter and sculptor Edwin Henry Landseer.

Lutyens suffered from rheumatic fever during his childhood and hence missed formal school education. He had special liking for drawing and mathematics, and said to have devised a novel method of drawing what he saw: he would carry a small pane of clear glass, a penknife and pieces of soap; he would look through the glass at some building and trace the outline of the portions he saw using the sharp edge of a soap piece.

He studied architecture at South Kensington School of Art (now the Royal College of Art, London), from 1885 to 1887. After college he joined the Ernest George and Harold Peto architectural practice. It was here that he first met Sir Herbert Baker. For many years he worked from offices at 29 Bloomsbury Square, London.

== Architectural career ==
=== Private practice ===
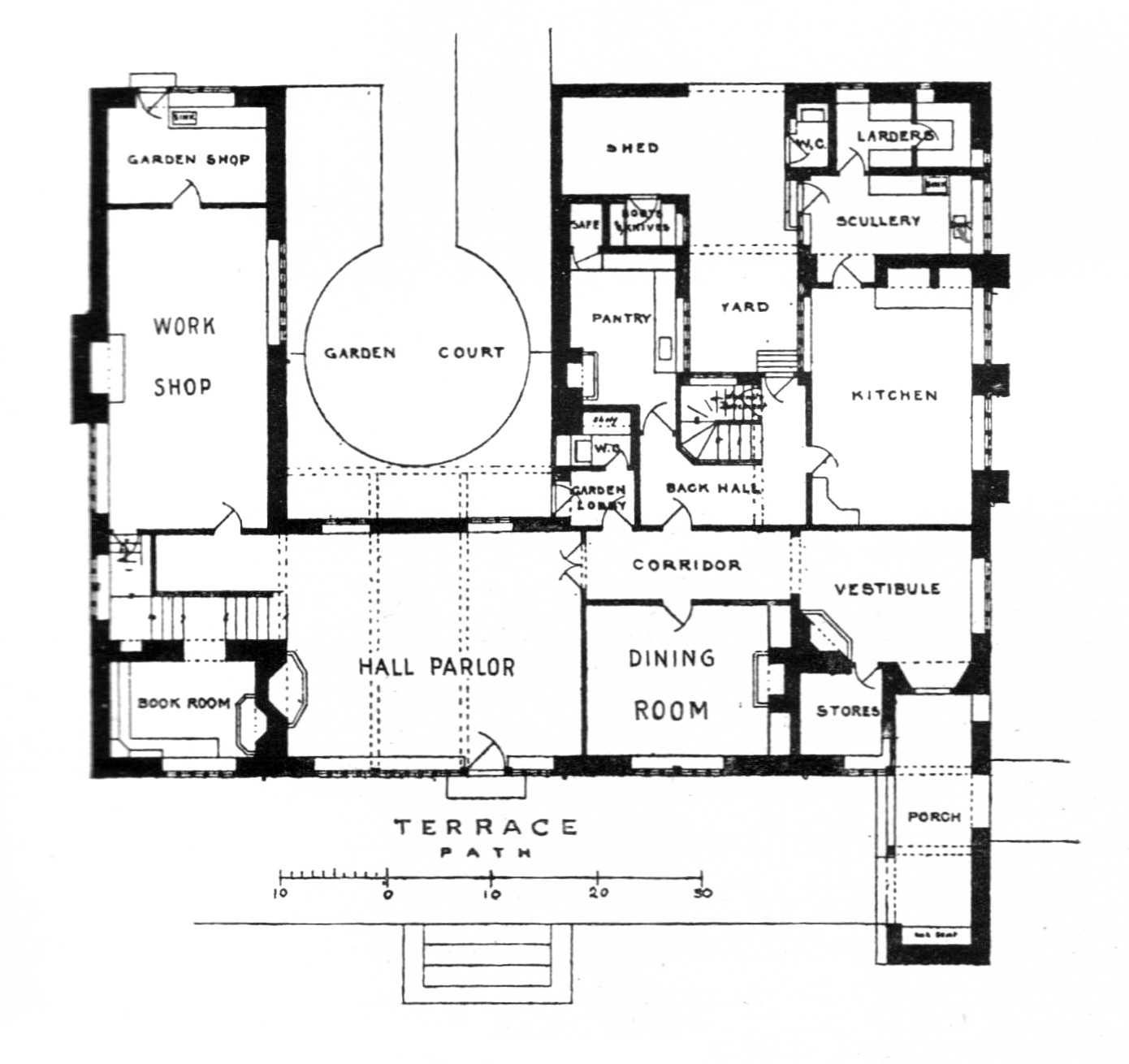
Ground floor plan of Munstead Wood

Following his studies at the Royal College of Art in London, he was articled to an architectural firm in 1887, though he departed shortly thereafter to establish his own independent practice. His early work, produced between 1888 and 1895, drew heavily on the traditional vernacular of Surrey buildings. A pivotal shift in his approach came with his introduction to the landscape gardener Gertrude Jekyll, who imparted to him the principles of “simplicity of intention and directness of purpose” that she herself had adopted from John Ruskin.

He began his own practice in 1888, his first commission being a private house at Crooksbury, Farnham, Surrey. During this work, he met the garden designer and horticulturalist Gertrude Jekyll. In 1896 he began work on a house for Jekyll at Munstead Wood near Godalming, Surrey. It was the beginning of a professional partnership that would define the look of many Lutyens country houses.

The "Lutyens–Jekyll" garden had hardy shrubbery and herbaceous plantings within a structural architecture of stairs and balustraded terraces. This combined style, of the formal with the informal, exemplified by brick paths, herbaceous borders, and with plants such as lilies, lupins, delphiniums and lavender, was in contrast to the formal bedding schemes favoured by the previous generation in the 19th century. This "natural" style was to define the "English garden" until modern times.

Lutyens's fame grew largely through the popularity of the new lifestyle magazine Country Life created by Edward Hudson, which featured many of his house designs. Hudson was a great admirer of Lutyens's style and commissioned Lutyens for a number of projects, including Lindisfarne Castle and the Country Life headquarters building in London, at 8 Tavistock Street. One of his assistants in the 1890s was Maxwell Ayrton.

By the turn of the century, Lutyens was recognised as one of architecture's coming men. In his major study of English domestic buildings, Das englische Haus, published in 1904, Hermann Muthesius wrote of Lutyens, "He is a young man who has come increasingly to the forefront of domestic architects and who may soon become the accepted leader among English builders of houses".

=== Works ===
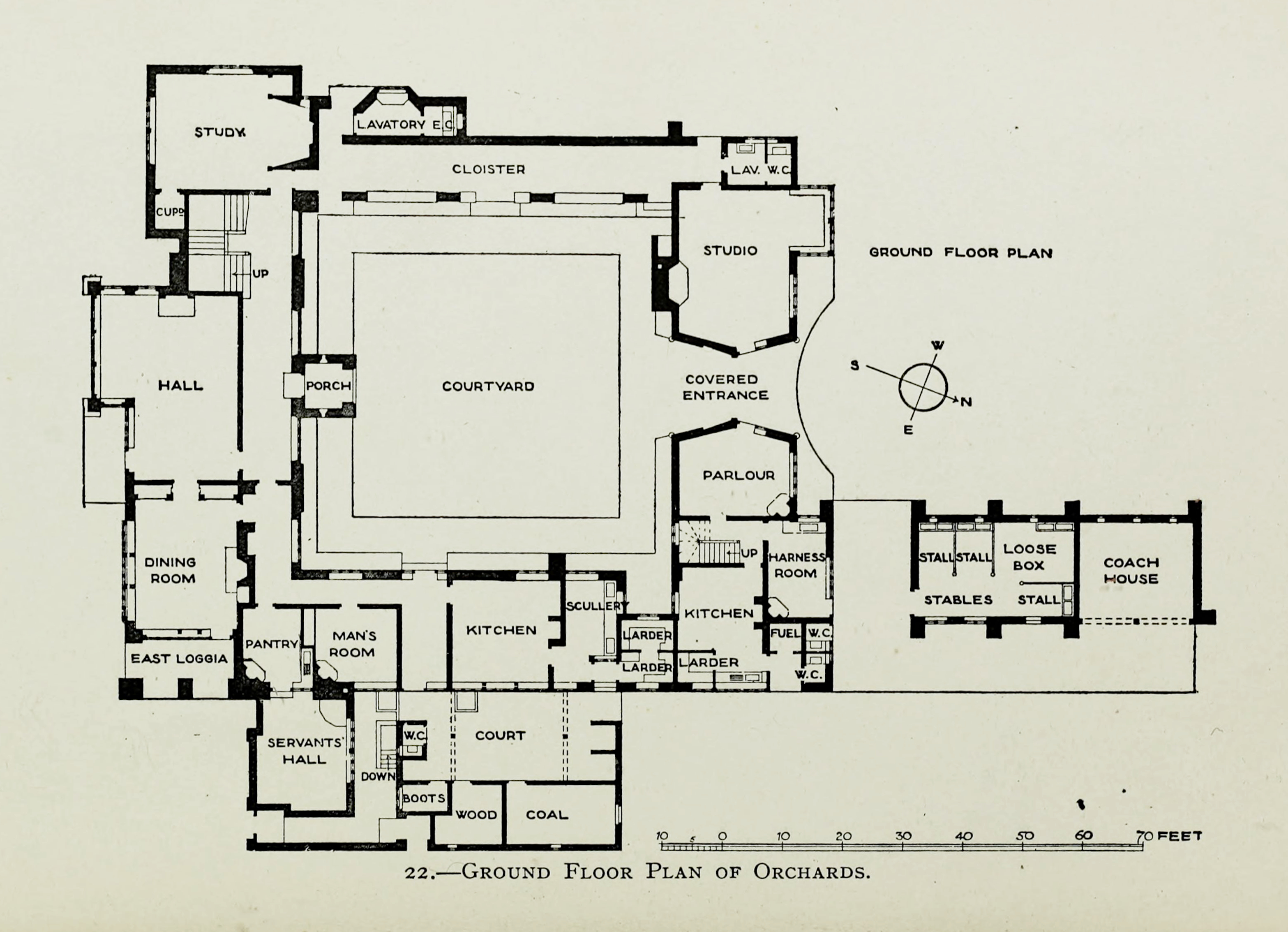
Ground floor plan of Orchards

The bulk of Lutyens's early work consisted of private houses in an Arts and Crafts style, strongly influenced by Tudor architecture and the vernacular styles of south-east England. This was the most innovative phase of his career. Important works of this period include Munstead Wood, Tigbourne Court, Orchards and Goddards in Surrey, Deanery Garden and Folly Farm in Berkshire, Overstrand Hall in Norfolk and Le Bois des Moutiers in France.

Munstead Wood, a house in Surrey, was designed by Edwin Lutyens and completed in 1896. It is considered the first project in which Lutyens fully expressed his personal qualities as a designer. The house balances the sweep of its roof with high, buttressed chimneys, and offsets small doorways with long strips of windows. The building established his professional reputation. Following Munstead Wood, Lutyens produced a series of notable country houses in which he adapted various historical styles to meet the requirements of contemporary domestic architecture.

After about 1900 his style gave way to a more conventional Classicism, a change of direction which had a profound influence on wider British architectural practice. His commissions were of a varied nature from private houses to two churches for the new Hampstead Garden Suburb in London to Julius Drewe's Castle Drogo near Drewsteignton in Devon and on to his contributions to India's new imperial capital, New Delhi (where he worked as chief architect with Herbert Baker and others). Here he added elements of local architectural styles to his classicism, and based his urbanisation scheme on Mughal water gardens. He also designed the Hyderabad House for the last Nizam of Hyderabad, as his Delhi palace and planned the layout for the Janpath and Rajpath roads.

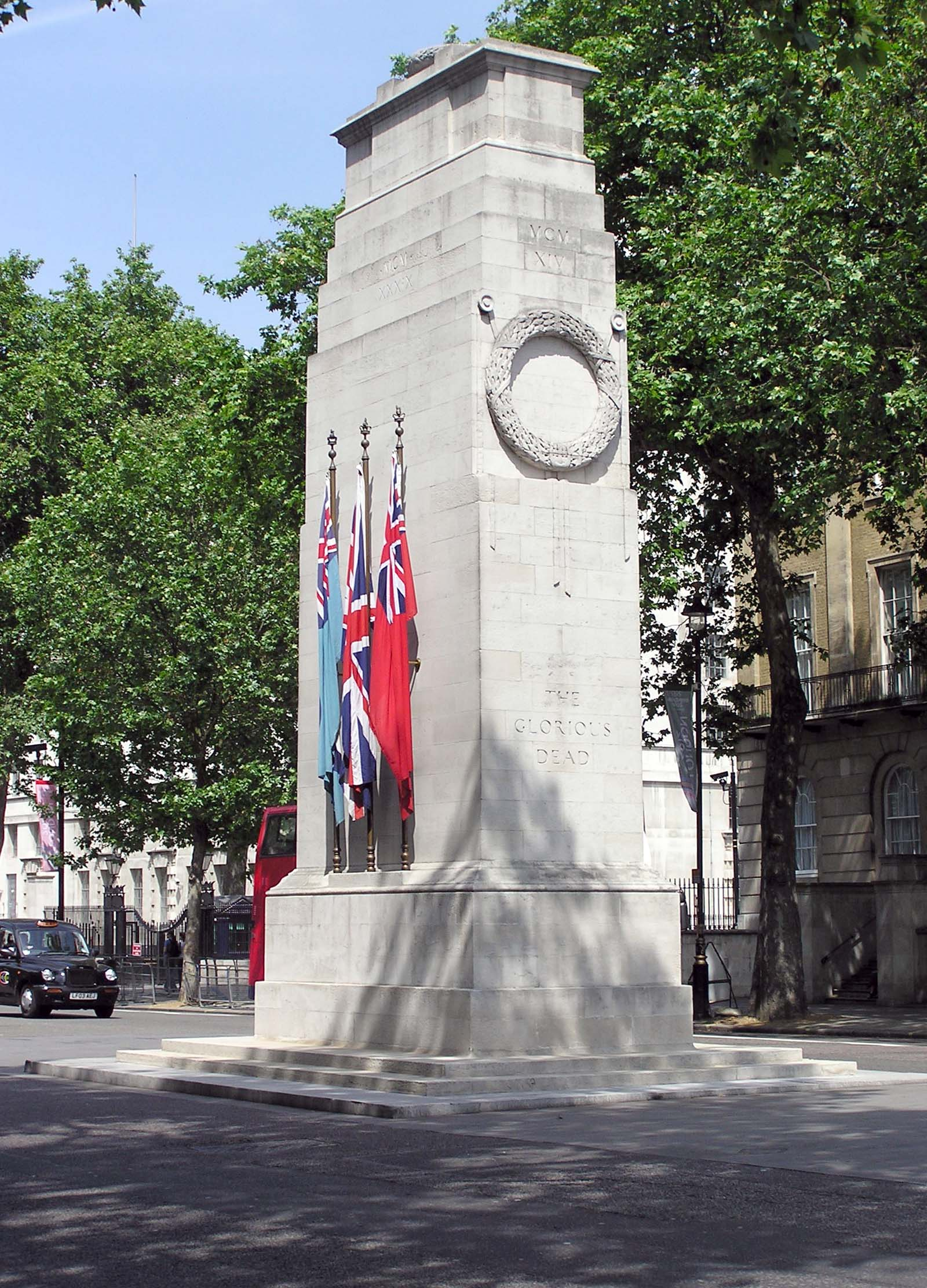
The Cenotaph, Whitehall, London

Before the end of World War I, he was appointed one of three principal architects for the Imperial War Graves Commission (now Commonwealth War Graves Commission) and was involved with the creation of many monuments to commemorate the dead. Larger cemeteries have a Stone of Remembrance, designed by him. The best known of these monuments are The Cenotaph in Whitehall, Westminster, and the Memorial to the Missing of the Somme, Thiepval. The Cenotaph was originally commissioned by David Lloyd George as a temporary structure to be the centrepiece of the Allied Victory Parade in 1919. Lloyd George proposed a catafalque, a low empty platform, but it was Lutyens's idea for the taller monument. The design took less than six hours to complete. His design for the Cenotaph in Whitehall became a permanent national memorial. Its design incorporates subtle, non-straight lines—using entasis curves on the vertical surfaces and arcs for the horizontal planes. This deliberate geometry was intended to create an abstract, timeless form of remembrance, free from overt religious or figurative symbolism. Lutyens also designed many other war memorials, and others are based on or inspired by Lutyens's designs. Examples of Lutyens's other war memorials include the War Memorial Gardens in Dublin, the Tower Hill memorial, the Manchester Cenotaph and the Arch of Remembrance memorial in Leicester.

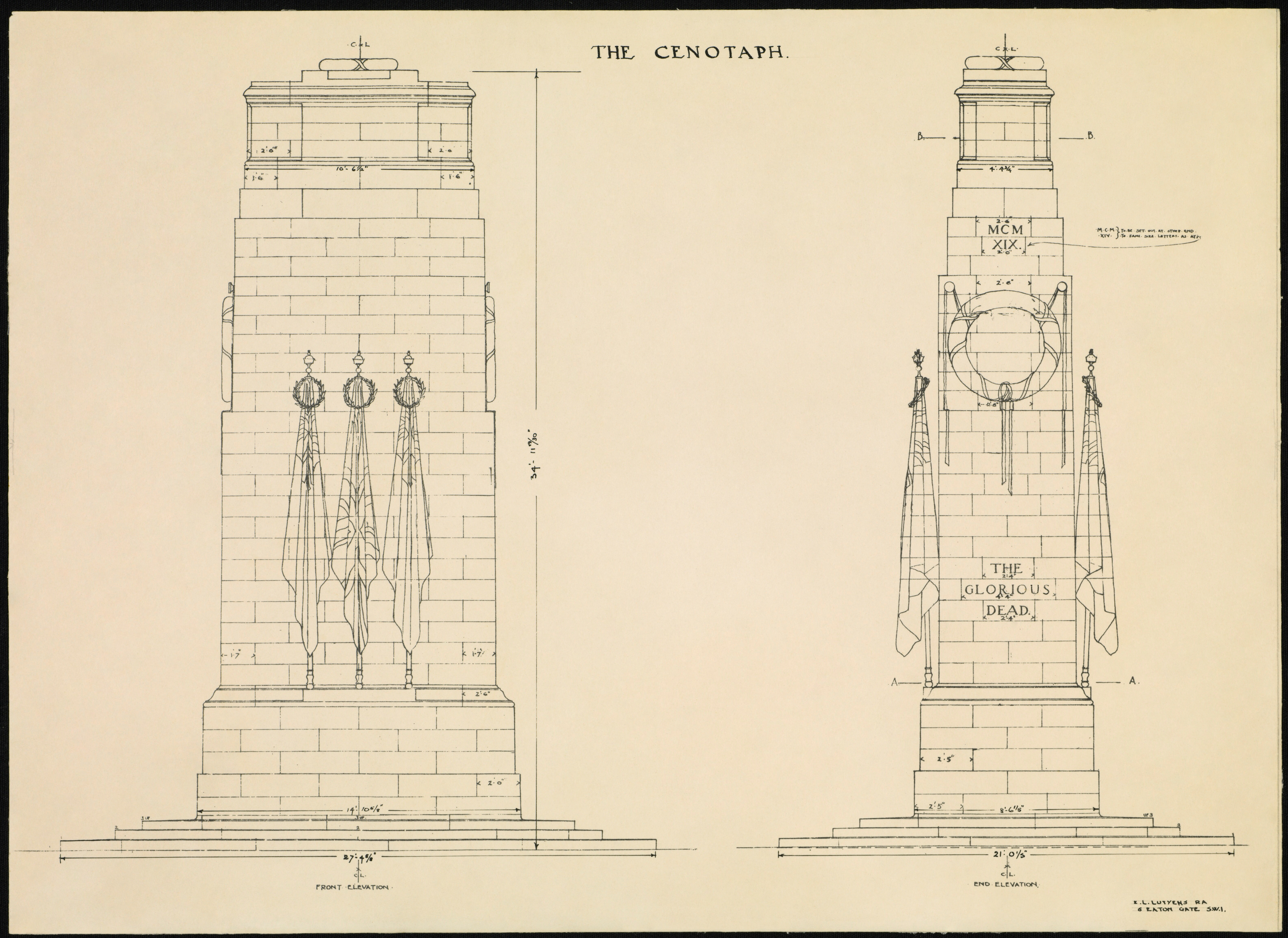
Lutyens's design for The Cenotaph

Lutyens also refurbished Lindisfarne Castle for its wealthy owner.

One of Lutyens's smaller works, but considered one of his masterpieces, is The Salutation, a house in Sandwich, Kent, England. Built in 1911–1912 with a 3.7-acre (1.5 ha) garden, it was commissioned by Henry Farrer, one of three sons of Sir William Farrer.

Lutyens heavily influenced Sigurd Frosterus when he designed Vanajanlinna Manor in Finland.

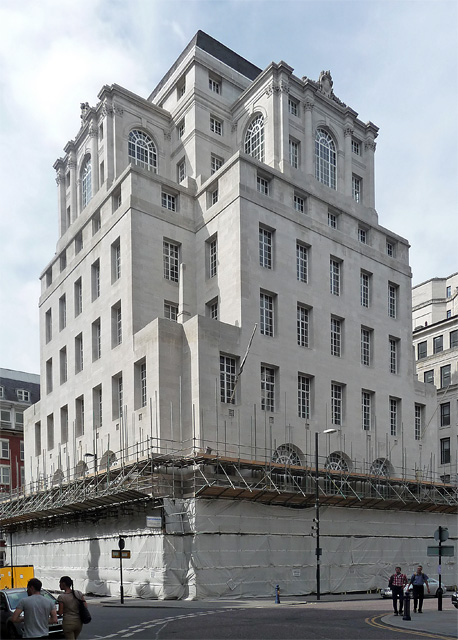
Lutyens's Midland Bank Building in Manchester, constructed in 1935

He was knighted for his work at New Delhi in 1918 and elected a Royal Academician in March 1920. In 1924, he was appointed a member of the newly created Royal Fine Art Commission, a position he held until his death.

While work continued in New Delhi, Lutyens received other commissions including several commercial buildings in London and the Embassy of the United Kingdom in Washington, D.C..

In 1924 he completed the supervision of the construction of what is perhaps his most popular design: Queen Mary's Dolls' House. This four-storey Palladian villa was built in 1/12 scale and is now a permanent exhibit in the public area of Windsor Castle. It was not conceived or built as a plaything for children; its goal was to exhibit the finest British craftsmanship of the period.

Lutyens was commissioned in 1929 to design a new Roman Catholic cathedral in Liverpool. He planned a vast building of brick and granite, topped with towers and a 510-foot (160 m) dome, with commissioned sculpture work by Charles Sargeant Jagger and W. C. H. King. His design, intended to be the second-largest church in the world, proposed a colossal brick and granite structure crowned by a dome exceeding that of St. Peter's in Rome. The interior was conceived as a processional "Via Crucis," guiding the worshipper through a sequence of spaces culminating under the main dome. Work on this building started in 1933, but was halted during World War II. After the war, the project ended due to a shortage of funding, with only the crypt completed. A model of Lutyens's unrealised building was given to and restored by the Walker Art Gallery in 1975 and is now on display in the Museum of Liverpool. The architect of the present Liverpool Metropolitan Cathedral, which was built over part of the crypt and consecrated in 1967, was Sir Frederick Gibberd.

In 1945, a year after his death, A Plan for the City & County of Kingston upon Hull was published. Lutyens worked on the plan with Sir Patrick Abercrombie and they are credited as its co-authors. Abercrombie's introduction in the plan makes special reference to Lutyens's contribution. The plan was, however, rejected by Hull City Council. He was also involved in the Royal Academy's planning for post-war London, an endeavour dismissed by Osbert Lancaster as "... not unlike what the new Nuremberg might have been had the Führer enjoyed the inestimable advantage of the advice and guidance of the late Sir Aston Webb".

=== Overseas commissions ===
==== Ireland (1906–1918) ====
Works in Ireland include the Irish National War Memorial Gardens in Islandbridge in Dublin, which consists of a bridge over the railway and a bridge over the River Liffey (unbuilt) and two tiered sunken gardens; Heywood House Gardens, County Laois (open to the public), consisting of a hedge garden, lawns, tiered sunken garden and a belvedere; extensive changes and extensions to Lambay Castle, Lambay Island, near Dublin, consisting of a circular battlement enclosing the restored and extended castle and farm building complex, upgraded cottages and stores near the harbour, a real tennis court, a large guest house (The White House), a boathouse and a chapel; alterations and extensions to Howth Castle, County Dublin; the unbuilt Hugh Lane gallery straddling the River Liffey on the site of the Ha'penny Bridge and the unbuilt Hugh Lane Gallery on the west side of St Stephen's Green; and Costelloe Lodge at Casla (also known as Costelloe), County Galway (that was used for refuge by J. Bruce Ismay, the Chairman of the White Star Line, following the sinking of the RMS Titanic). In 1907, Lutyens designed Tranarossan House, located just north of Downings on the Rosguill Peninsula on the north coast of County Donegal. The house was built of local granite for Mr and Mrs Phillimore, from London, as a holiday home. In 1937, Mrs Phillimore donated it to An Óige (Irish Youth Hostels Association) for the "youth of Ireland", and it has been a hostel ever since.

==== India (1912–1930) ====
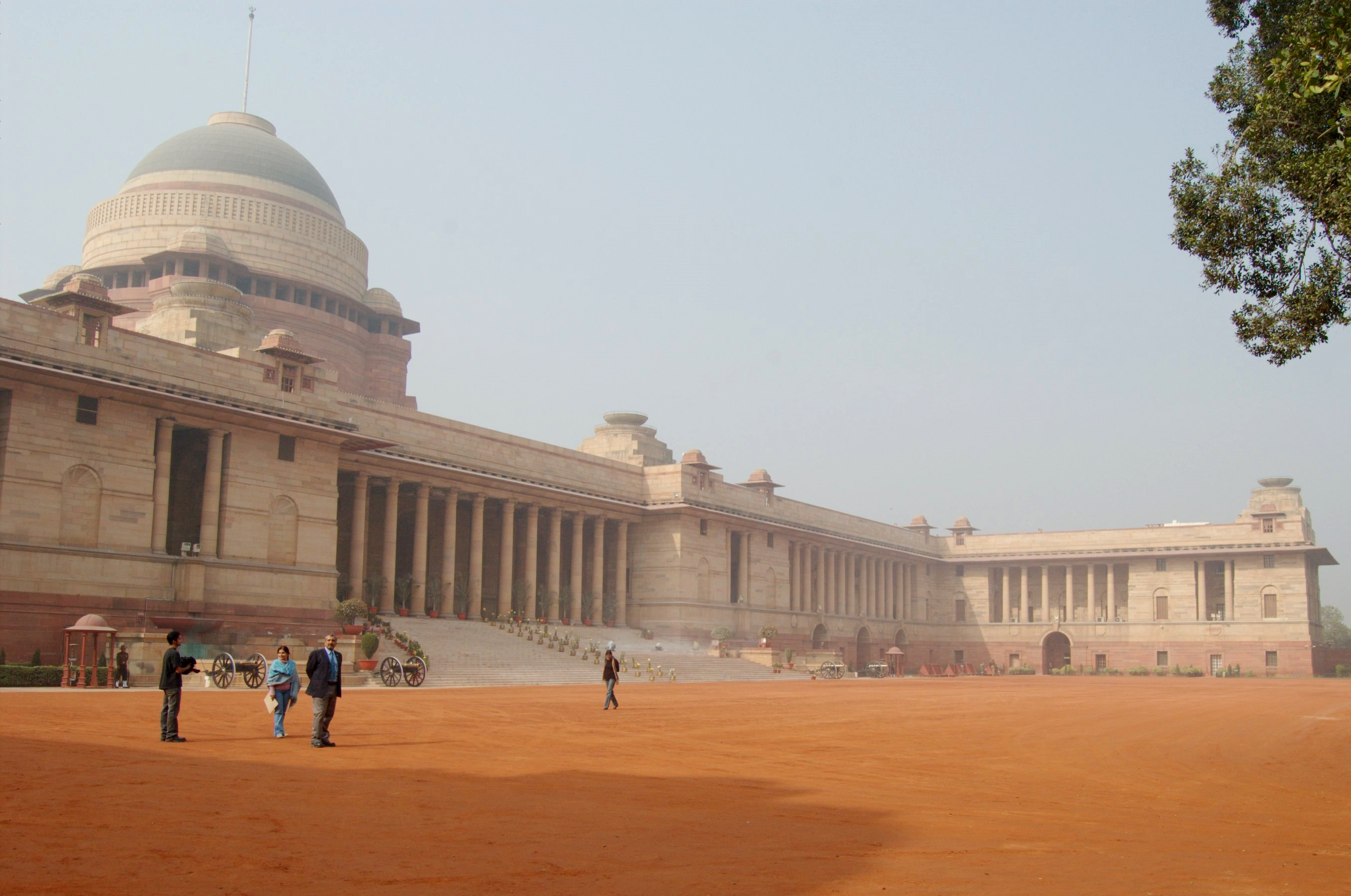
Rashtrapati Bhavan, the home of the President of India, was designed by Lutyens.

Largely designed by Lutyens over 20 or so years (1912 to 1930), New Delhi, situated within the metropolis of Delhi, popularly known as 'Lutyens' Delhi', was chosen to replace Calcutta as the seat of the British Indian government in 1911; the project was completed in 1929 and officially inaugurated in 1931. In undertaking this project, Lutyens invented his own new order of classical architecture, which has become known as the Delhi Order and was used by him for several designs in England, such as Campion Hall, Oxford. Unlike the more traditional British architects who came before him, he was both inspired by and incorporated various features from the local and traditional Indian architecture—something most clearly seen in the great drum-mounted Buddhist dome of Viceroy's House, now Rashtrapati Bhavan. This palatial building, containing 340 rooms, is built on an area of some 330 acres (130 ha) and incorporates a private garden also designed by Lutyens. The building was designed as the official residence of the Viceroy of India and is now the official residence of the President of India.

The Delhi Order columns at the front entrance of the palace have bells carved into them, which, it has been suggested, Lutyens had designed with the idea that as the bells were silent the British rule would never come to an end. At one time, more than 2,000 people were required to care for the building and serve the Rastrapati Bhavan.

The new city contains both the Parliament buildings and government offices (many designed by Herbert Baker) and was built distinctively of the local red sandstone using the traditional Mughal style.

When composing the plans for New Delhi, Lutyens planned for the new city to lie southwest of the walled city of Shahjahanbad. His plans for the city also laid out the street plan for New Delhi consisting of wide tree-lined avenues.

Built in the spirit of British colonial rule, the place where the new imperial city and the older native settlement met was intended to be a market. It was there that Lutyens imagined the Indian traders would participate in "the grand shopping centre for the residents of Shahjahanabad and New Delhi", thus giving rise to the D-shaped market seen today.

Many of the garden-ringed villas in the Lutyens' Bungalow Zone (LBZ)—also known as Lutyens' Delhi—that were part of Lutyens's original scheme for New Delhi are under threat due to the constant pressure for development in Delhi. The LBZ was placed on the 2002 World Monuments Fund Watch List of 100 Most Endangered Sites. None of the bungalows in the LBZ were designed by Lutyens—he only designed the four bungalows in the Presidential Estate surrounding Rashtrapati Bhavan at Willingdon Crescent, now known as Mother Teresa Crescent. Other buildings in Delhi that Lutyens designed include Baroda House, Bikaner House, Hyderabad House, and Patiala House.

In recognition of his architectural accomplishments for the British Raj, Lutyens was made a Knight Commander of the Order of the Indian Empire (KCIE) on 1 January 1930. As a chivalric order, the KCIE knighthood held precedence over his earlier bachelor knighthood.

A bust of Lutyens in the Rastrapati bhavan is the only statue of a Westerner that was left in its original position in New Delhi. However, on 23 February 2026, this bust was replaced with the bust of C. Rajagopalachari by President Draupadi Murmu on the occasion of 'Rajaji Utsav'. This is an ongoing initiative by the Government of India led by Prime Minister Narendra Modi towards "mental decolonization" of India. Lutyens's work in New Delhi is the focus of Robert Grant Irving's book Indian Summer.

In spite of his monumental work in India, Lutyens believed that the peoples of the Indian sub-continent were less civilised and less intelligent than Europeans, although these views were common at the time among many of his contemporaries. He thought the Indian Indo-Saracenic style was "formless, not of carved decoration, an anathema...hardly qualified as architecture at all." Endless battles were fought between him and Viceroy Hardinge over architectural style: Lutyens wanted classical, the architecture of the Empire – Hardinge wanted elements of the Indian vernacular for political and cultural reasons.

==== Spain (1915–1928) ====
In Madrid, Lutyens's work can be seen in the interiors of the Liria Palace, a neoclassical building which was severely damaged during the Spanish Civil War. The palace was originally built in the 18th century for James FitzJames, 1st Duke of Berwick, and still belongs to his descendants. Lutyens's reconstruction was commissioned by Jacobo Fitz-James Stuart, 17th Duke of Alba. The Duke had been in contact with Lutyens while serving as the Spanish ambassador to the Court of St. James's.

Between 1915 and 1928, Lutyens also produced designs for a new palace for the Duke of Alba's younger brother, Hernando Fitz-James Stuart, 18th Duke of Peñaranda. The palace of El Guadalperal, as it was to be called, would have been, if built, Edwin Lutyens's largest country house.

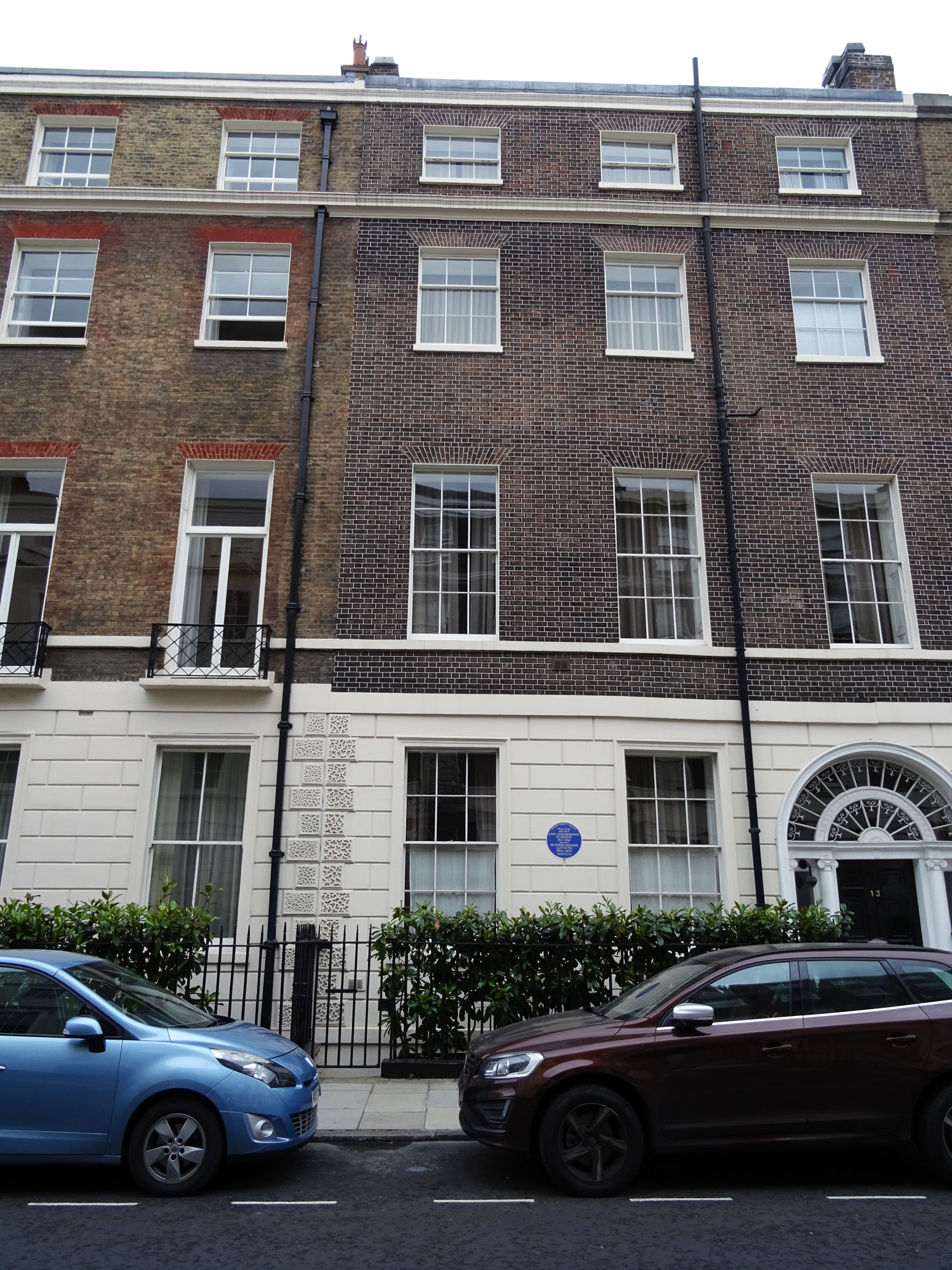
13 Mansfield Street, Marylebone, Lutyens's London home from 1919 to his death in 1944

== Personal life ==
Lutyens married Lady Emily Bulwer-Lytton (1874–1964) on 4 August 1897 at Knebworth, Hertfordshire. She was third daughter of Edith (née Villiers) and the 1st Earl of Lytton, a former Viceroy of India. Lady Emily had proposed to Lutyens two years before the wedding, and her parents disapproved of the marriage. Their marriage was largely unsatisfactory, practically from the start, with Lady Emily developing interests in theosophy. They had five children:

- Barbara Lutyens (1898–1981), second wife of Euan Wallace (1892–1941), Minister of Transport.
- Robert Lutyens (1901–1971), interior designer. Designed the façade used for over 40 Marks & Spencer stores.
- Ursula Lutyens (1904–1967), wife of the 3rd Viscount Ridley. They were the parents of the 4th Viscount Ridley (1925–2012), and of the Cabinet Minister Nicholas Ridley (1929–1993). Nicholas Ridley was the father of Edwin Lutyens's biographer, Jane Ridley.
- (Agnes) Elisabeth Lutyens (1906–1983), a well-known composer. Second marriage to the conductor Edward Clark.
- (Edith Penelope) Mary Lutyens (1908–1999), a writer known for her books about the philosopher Jiddu Krishnamurti.

He is said to have a carried a notebook always, which he called "a virgin".

During the later years of his life, Lutyens suffered with several bouts of pneumonia.

== Death ==
In the early 1940s he was diagnosed with cancer. He died on 1 January 1944 and was cremated at East Finchley Crematorium in north London, also known as St Marylebone Crematorium. His ashes were interred in the crypt of St. Paul's Cathedral, beneath a memorial designed by his friend and fellow architect William Curtis Green.

== Major buildings and projects ==
- 1897: Munstead Wood, Surrey
- 1899: Orchards, Surrey
- 1900: Goddards, Surrey
- 1901: Tigbourne Court, Surrey
- 1901: Deanery Garden, Sonning, Berkshire
- 1903: Papillon Hall, Lubenham, Leicestershire
- 1911: British Medical Association in Tavistock Square, London
- 1912: Great Dixter, Northiam, East Sussex
- 1924–37 Midland Bank, Poultry
- 1928: Hyderabad House, New Delhi
- 1929: Rashtrapathi Bhavan, New Delhi
- 1930: Castle Drogo, Drewsteignton, Devon
- 1935: The Midland Bank, Manchester
- 1936: Baroda House, New Delhi
- 1936–1938: Villers–Bretonneux Australian National Memorial, Somme, France

== Recognition and legacy ==
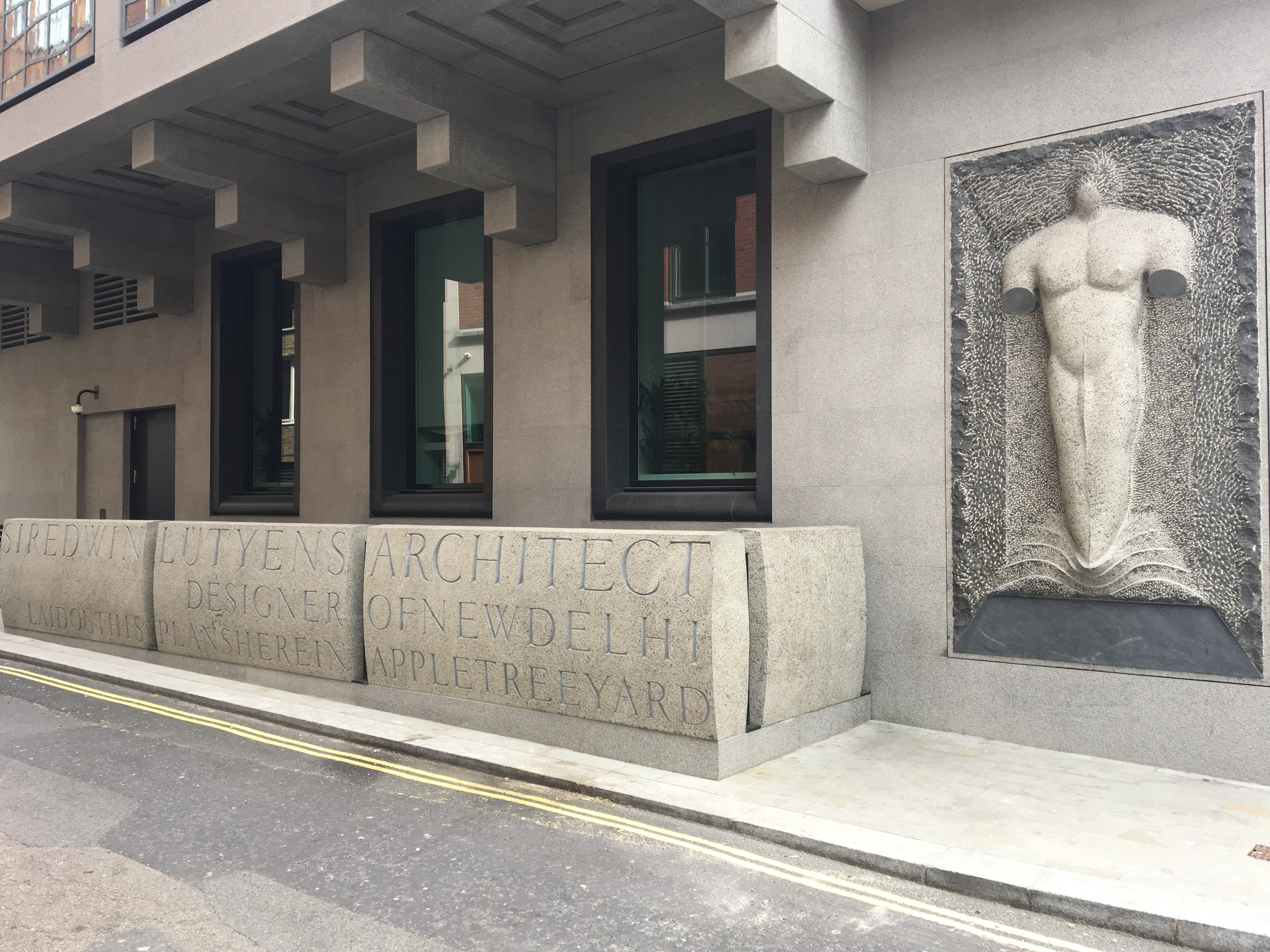
Memorial to Lutyens by Stephen Cox (2015)

Lutyens received the RIBA Royal Gold Medal in 1921, and the American Institute of Architects Gold Medal in 1925. In November 2015 the British government announced that all 44 of Lutyens's surviving First World War memorials in Britain (Note: 43 in England, 1 in Wales) had now been listed on the advice of Historic England, and were therefore all protected by law. This involved the one remaining memorial—the Gerrards Cross Memorial Building in Buckinghamshire—being added to the list, plus a further fourteen having their statuses upgraded. For the Imperial Tobacco Company's First World War memorial, installed in 1921 at its Bedminster Head Office, this protection arrived too late to prevent its destruction following the company's take-over in 1986 by Hanson Trust plc.

The architectural critic Ian Nairn wrote of Lutyen's Surrey "masterpieces" in the 1971 Surrey volume of the Buildings of England series, while noting that; "the genius and the charlatan were very close together in Lutyens". In the introduction to the catalogue for the 1981 Lutyens exhibition at the Hayward Gallery, the architectural writer Colin Amery described Lutyens as "the builder of some of our finest country houses and gardens".

In 2015 a memorial to Lutyens by the sculptor Stephen Cox was erected in Apple Tree Yard, Mayfair, London, adjacent to the studio where Lutyens prepared the designs for New Delhi. A bust of Lutyens in the Rashtrapati Bhavan was removed in 2026 in a suggested act of decolonisation, replaced by a bust of Chakravarti Rajagopalachari, the first governor-general of independent India.

== Gallery ==
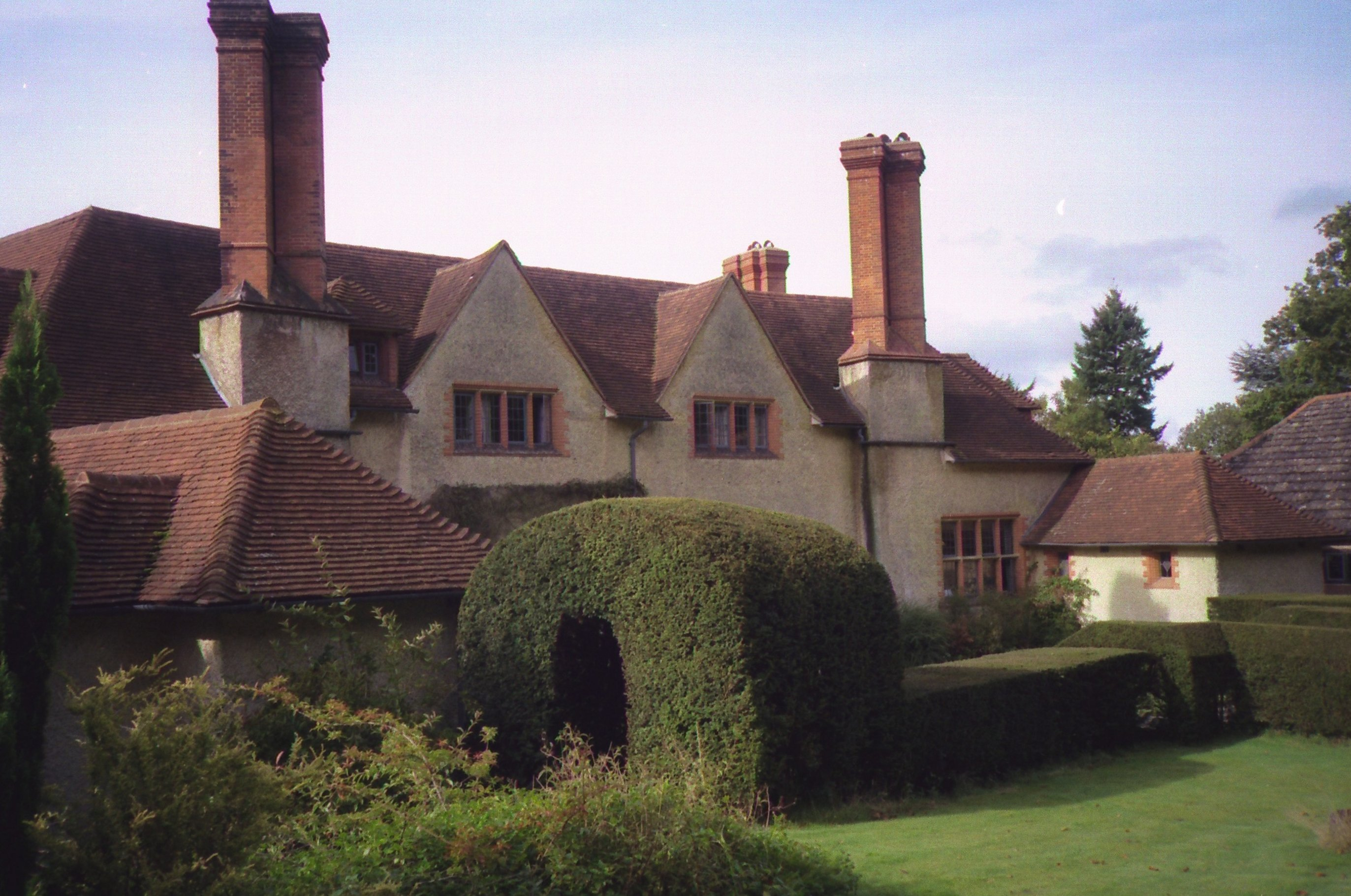
Goddards, Surrey, England, U.K. (1898–1900)

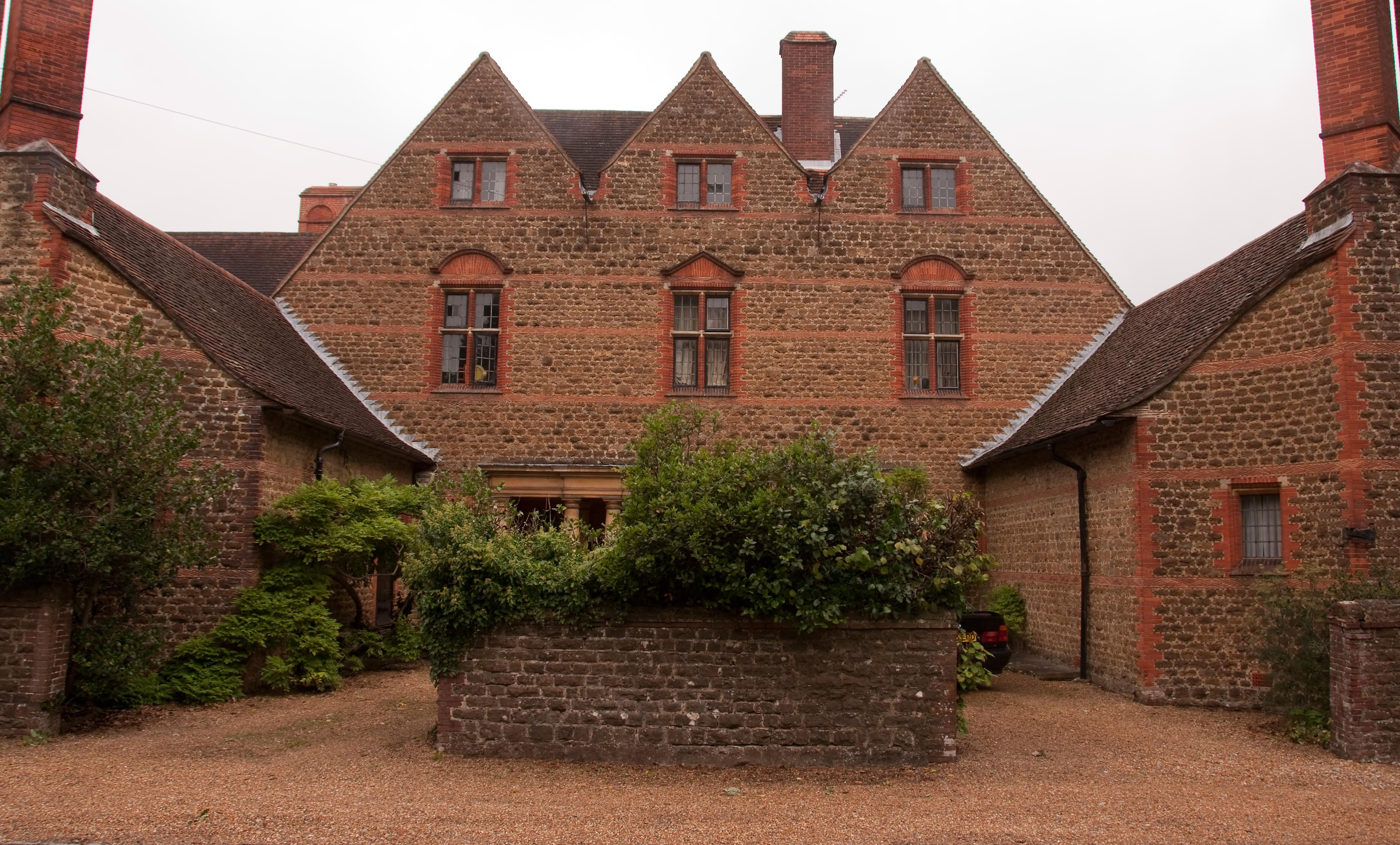
Tigbourne Court, Surrey, England, U.K. (1899–1901)

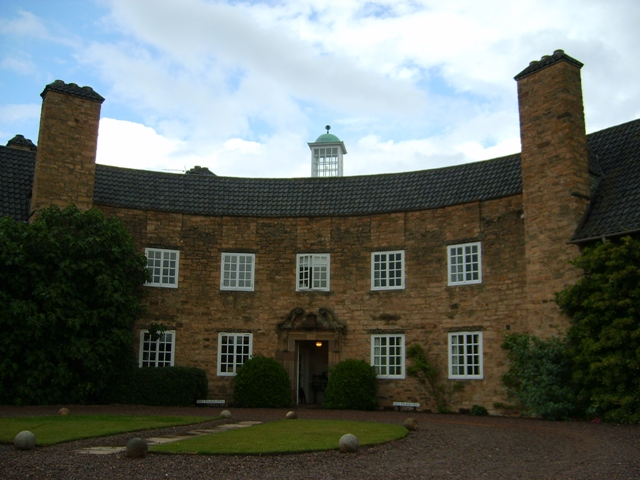
Greywalls house, East Lothian, Scotland, U.K. (1901)

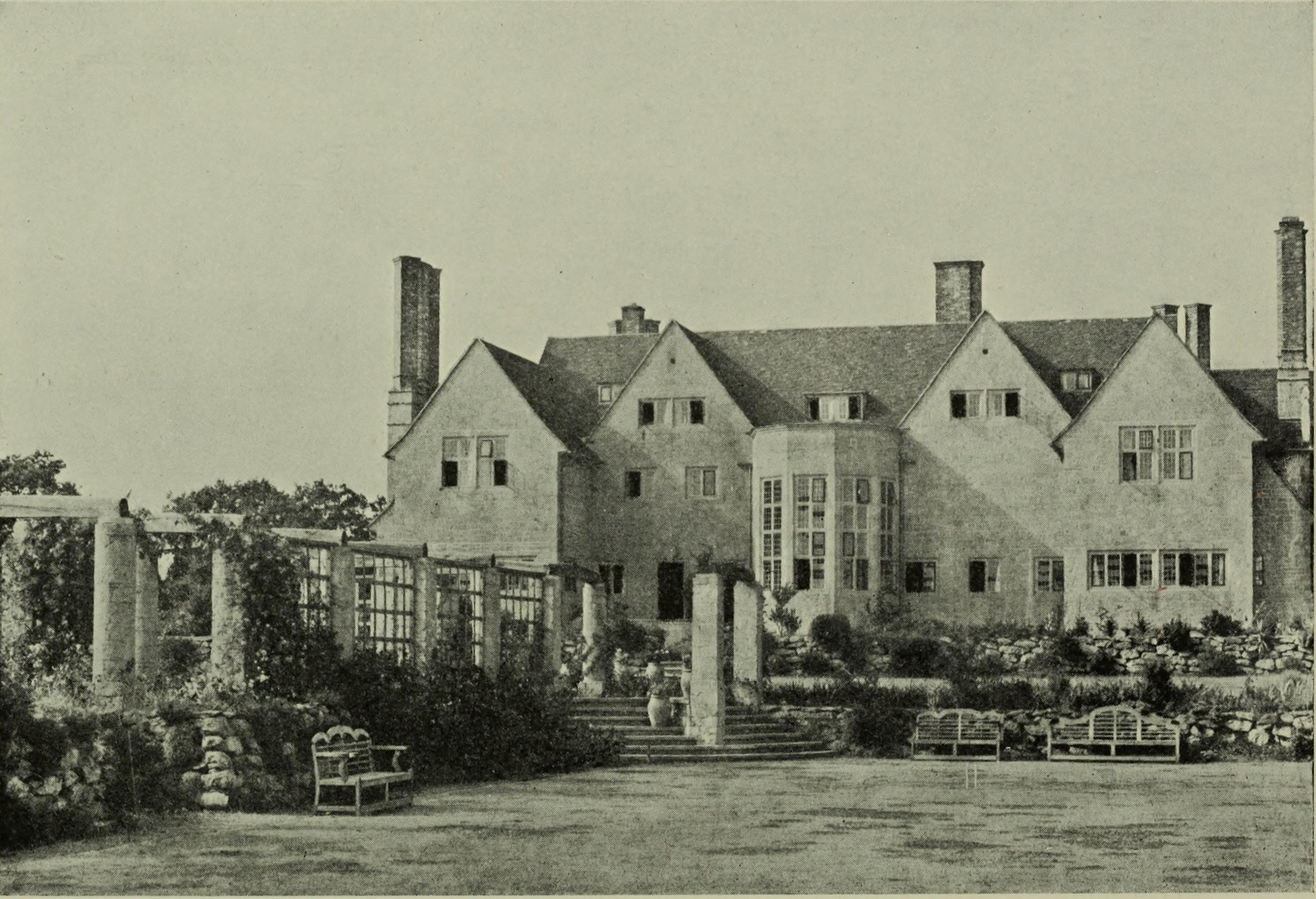
Little Thakeham, West Sussex, England, U.K. (1902)

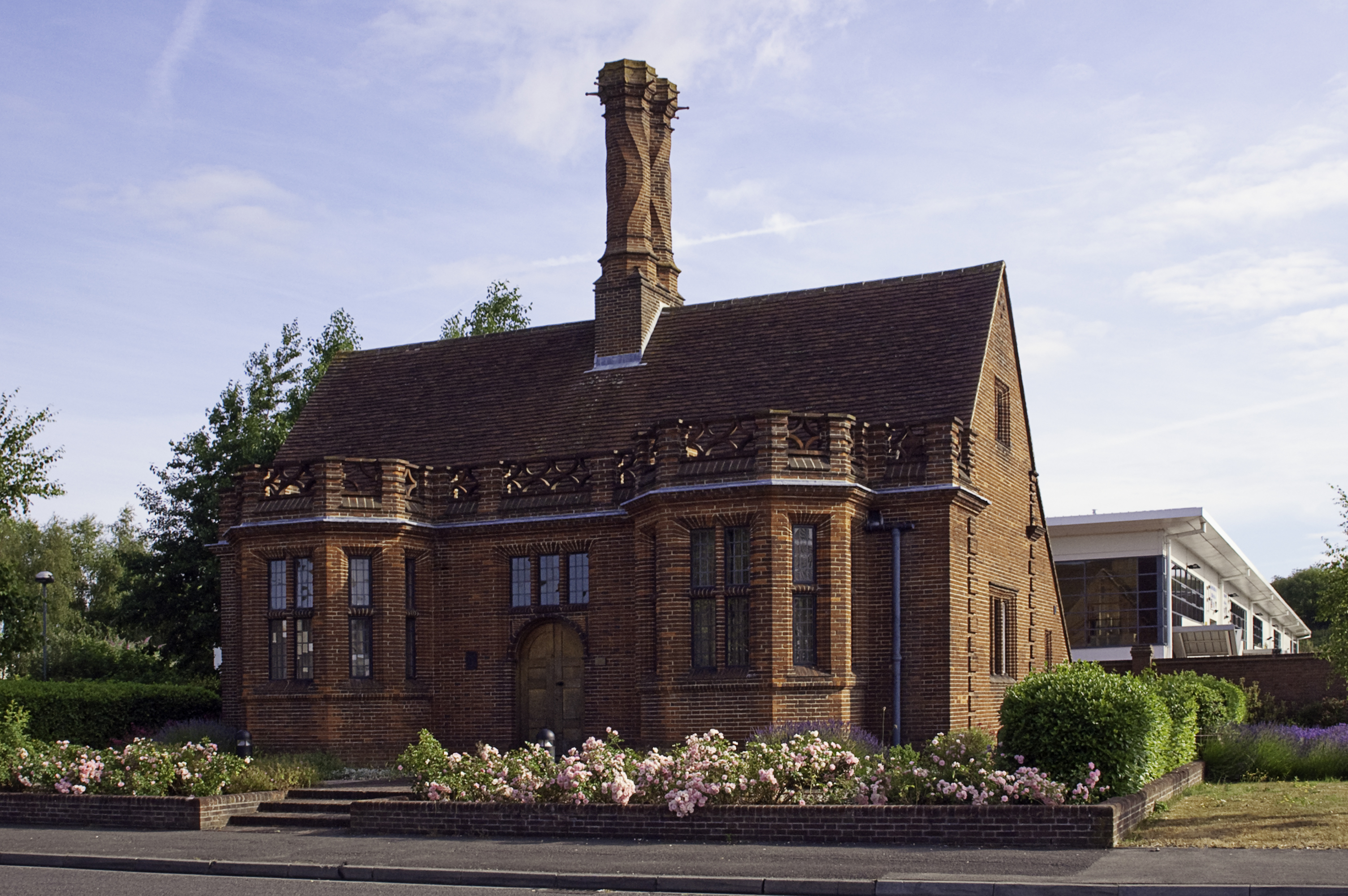
Daneshill Brick and Tile Company offices, near Old Basing, Hampshire, England, U.K. (1903)

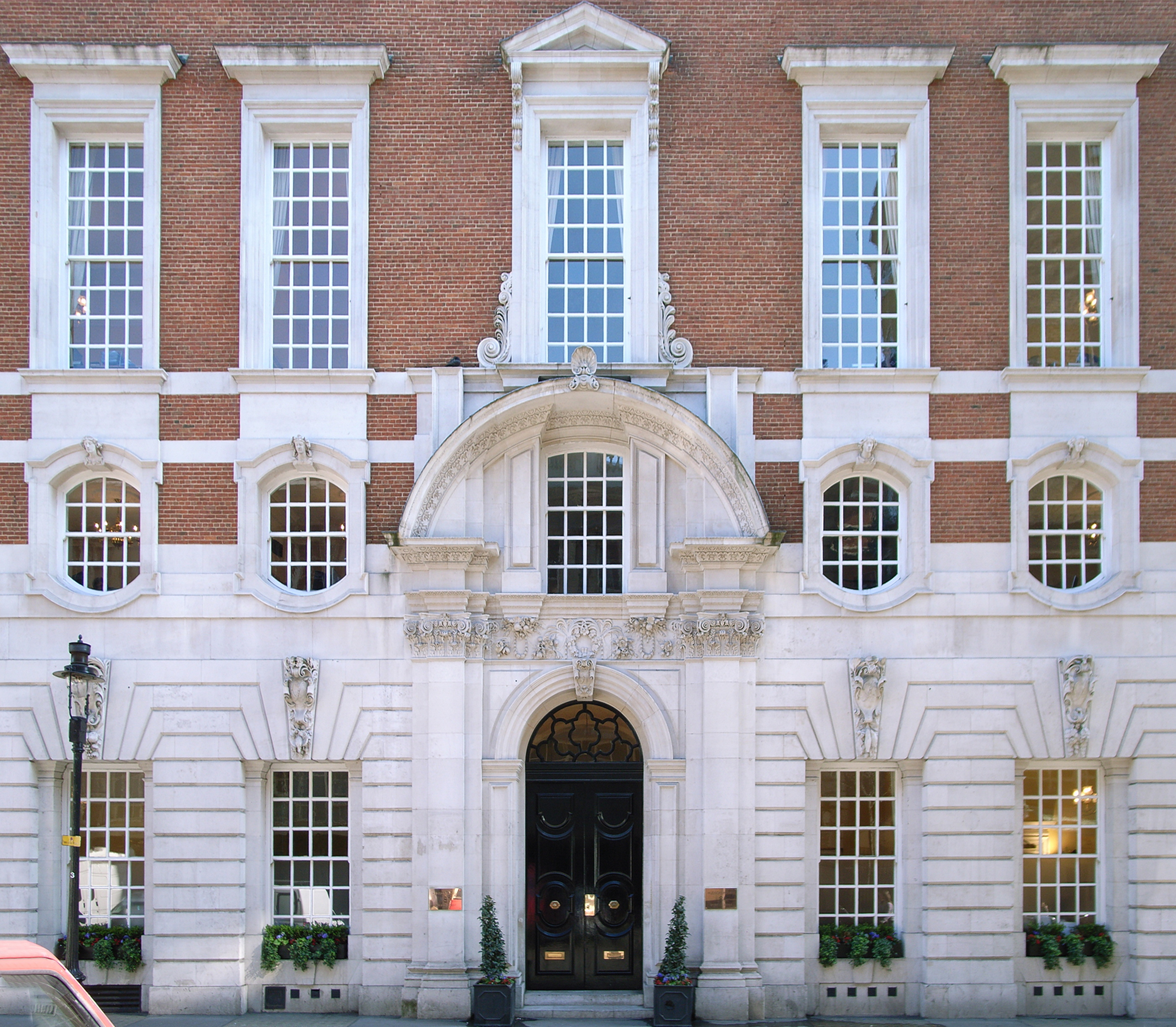
Country Life Offices, Tavistock Street, London, England, U.K. (1905)

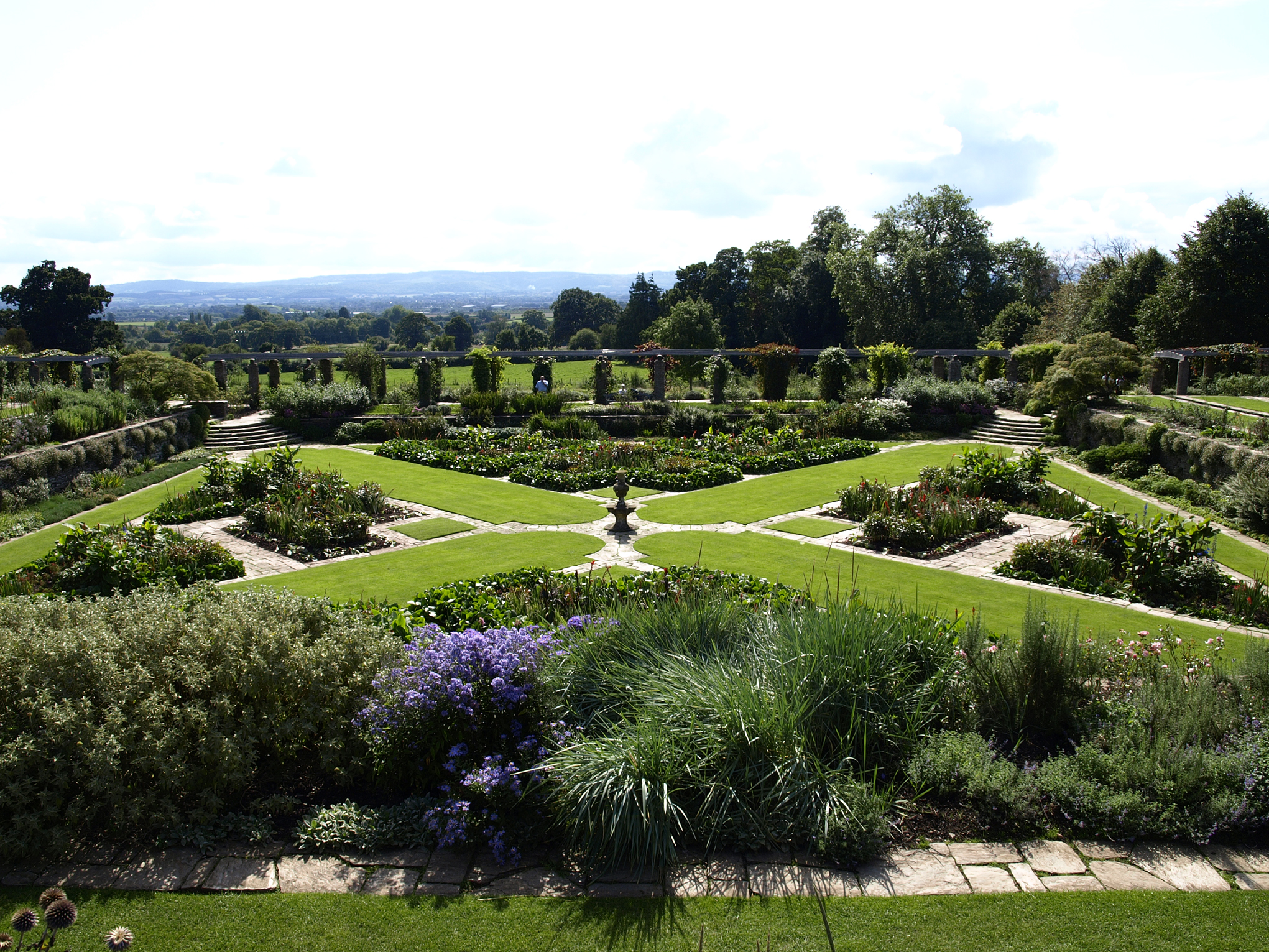
Hestercombe House, Somerset, with Gertrude Jekyll (1904–1906)

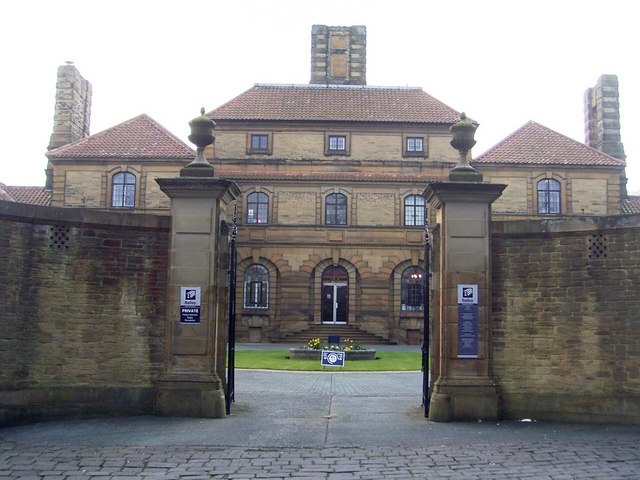
Heathcote, Ilkley, Yorkshire, England, U.K. (1906–1908)

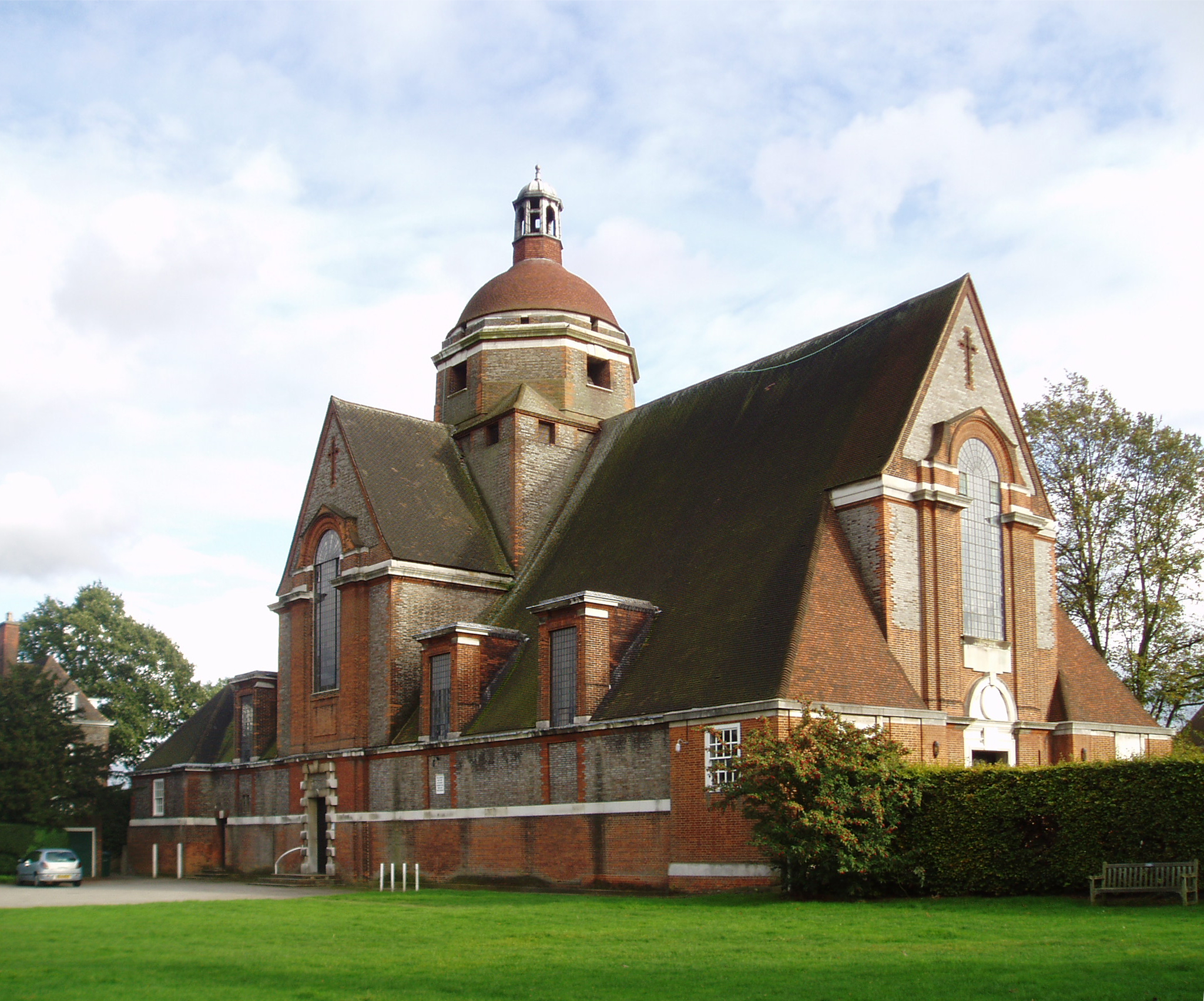
Free Church, Hampstead Garden Suburb, London, England, U.K. (1908–1910)

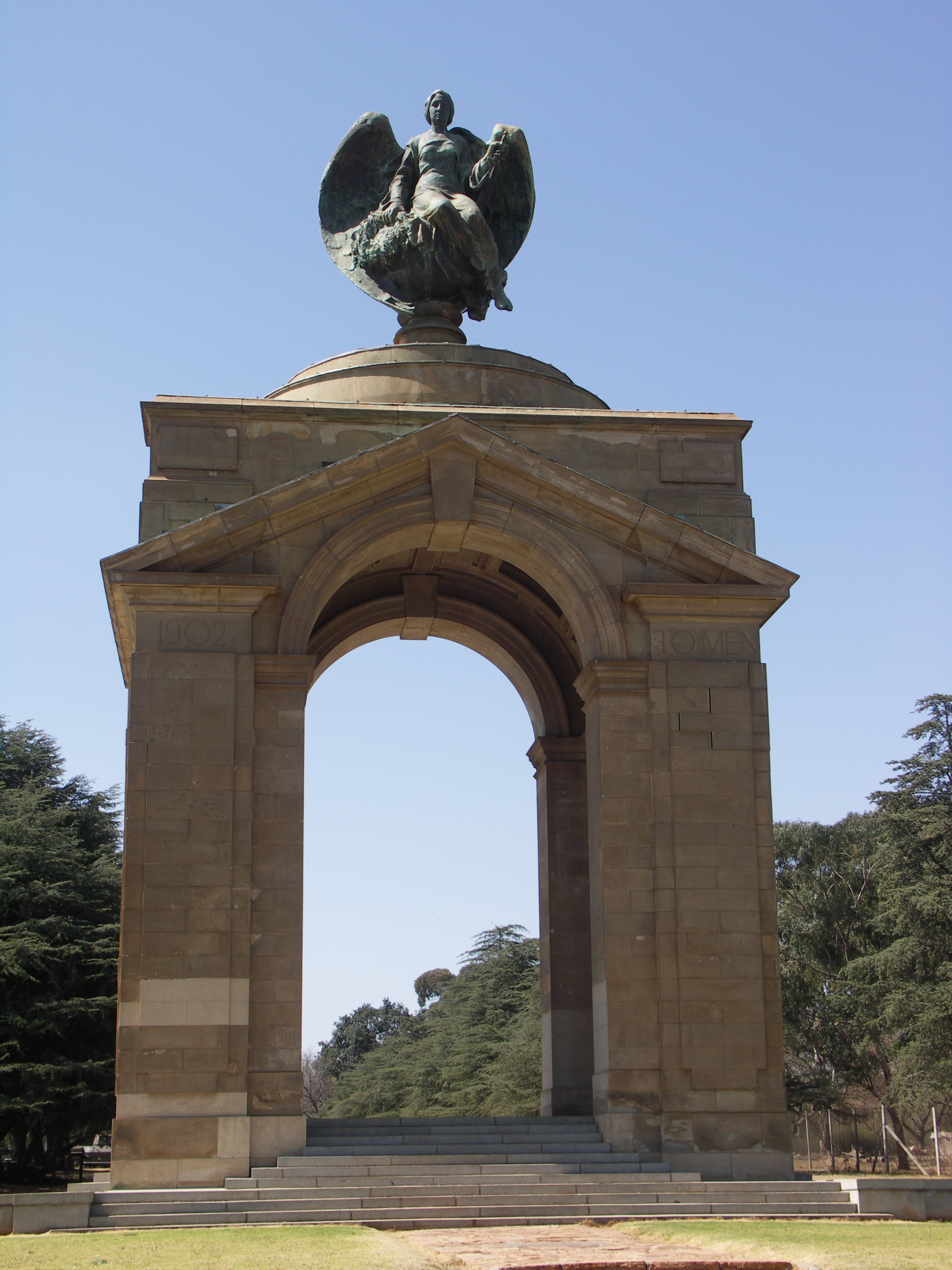
Anglo-Boer War Memorial, Johannesburg, South Africa (1910)

Nashdom, Taplow, Buckinghamshire, England, U.K. (1908–1911)

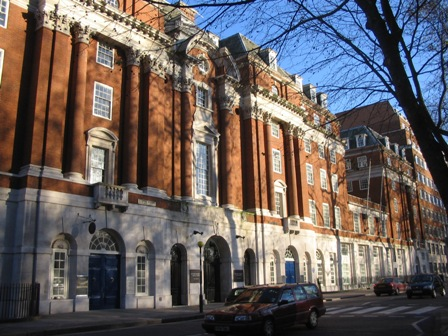
British Medical Association, Tavistock Square, London, England, U.K. (1911)

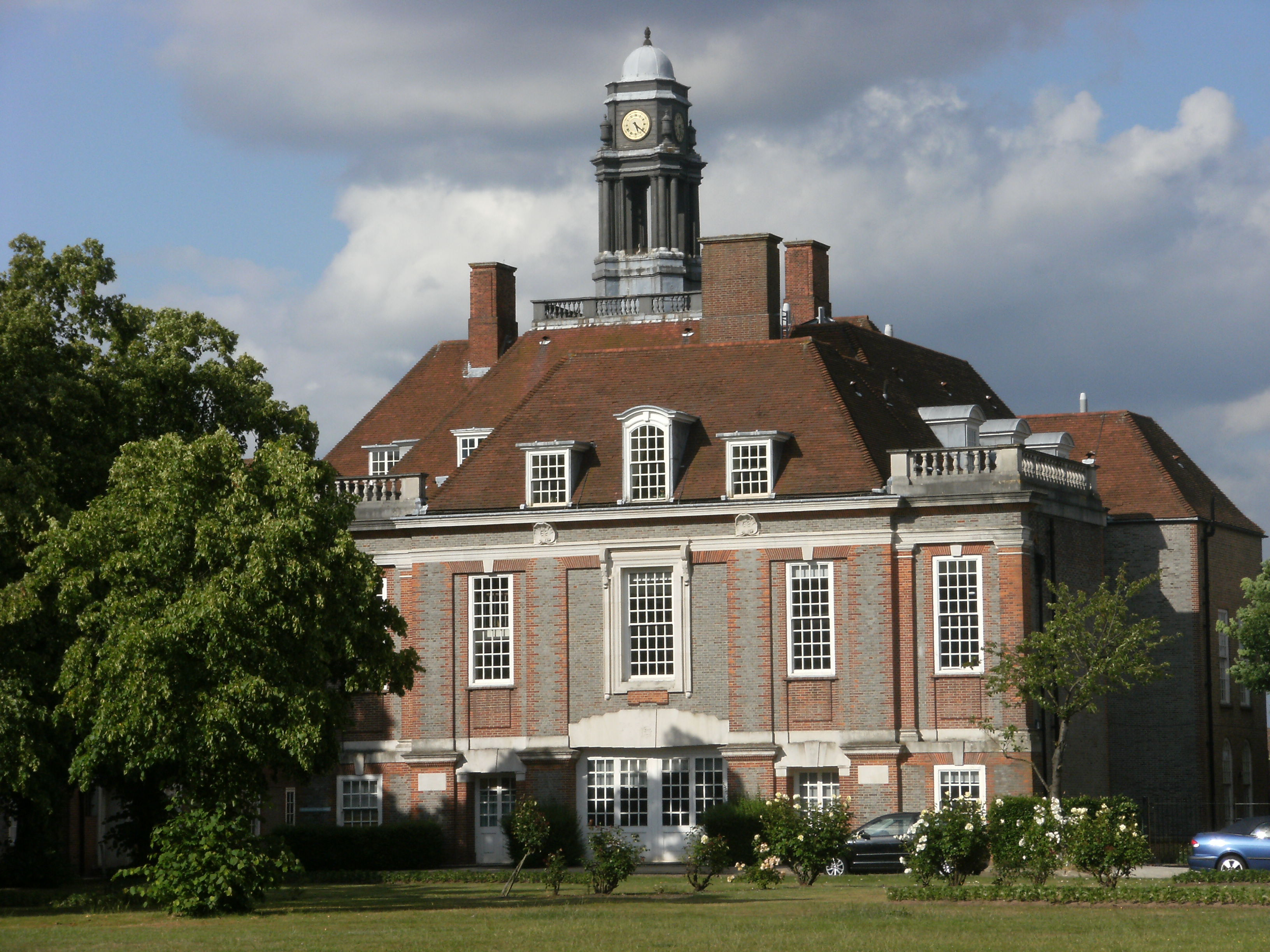
Henrietta Barnett School, Hampstead Garden Suburb, London, England, U.K. (1911)

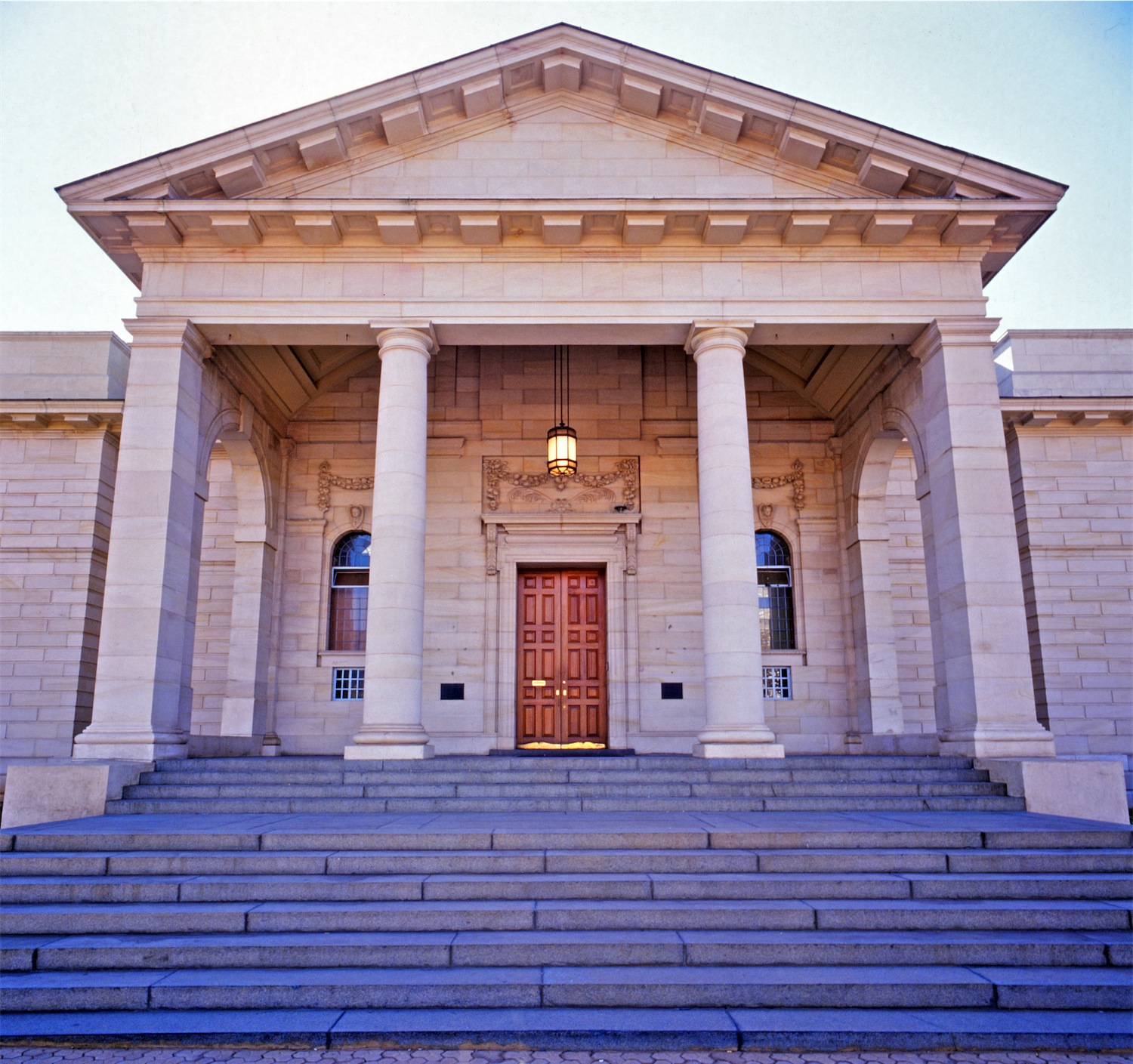
Johannesburg Art Gallery, Klein Street, Johannesburg, South Africa (1910–1915)

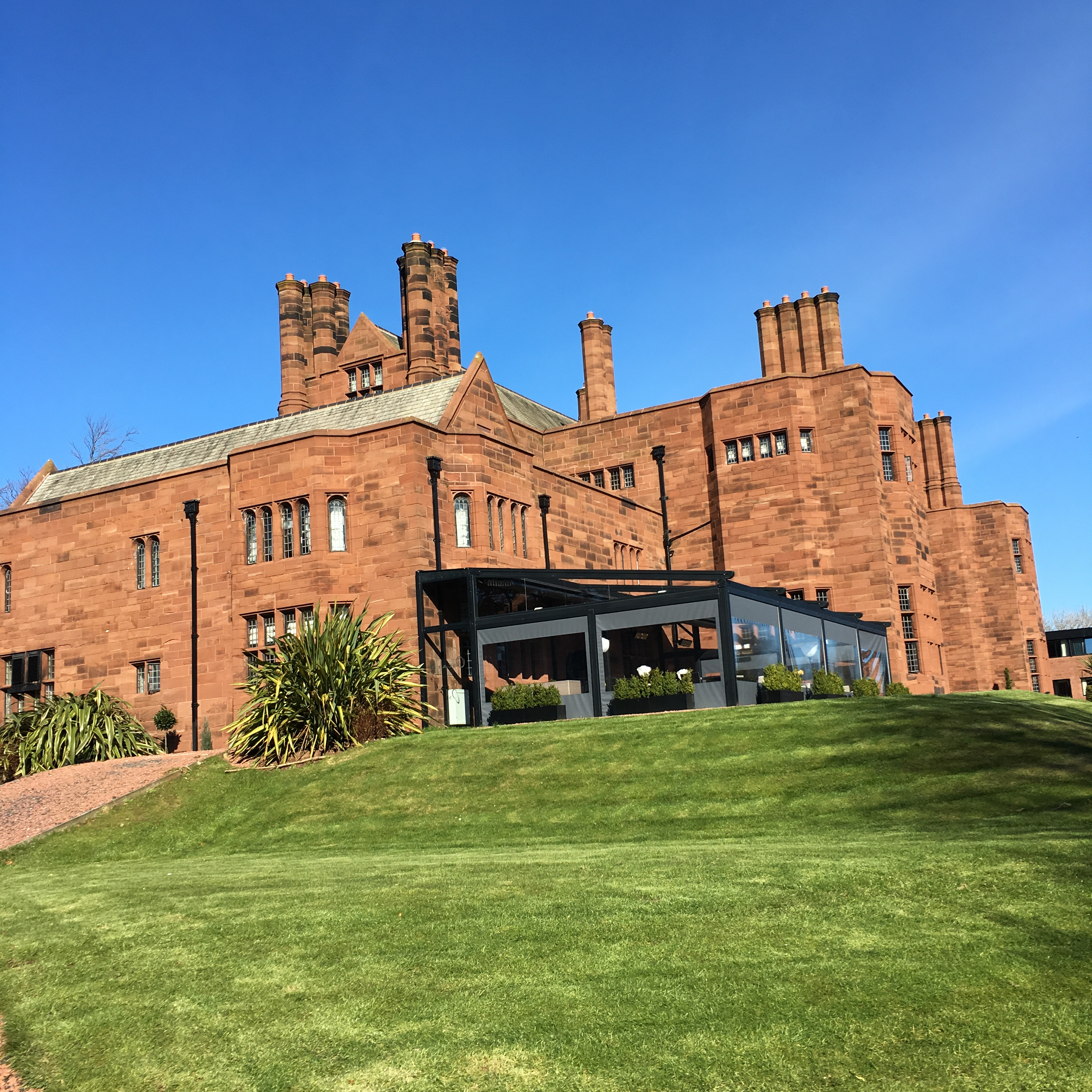
Abbey House, Barrow-in-Furness, Cumbria, England, U.K. (1914)

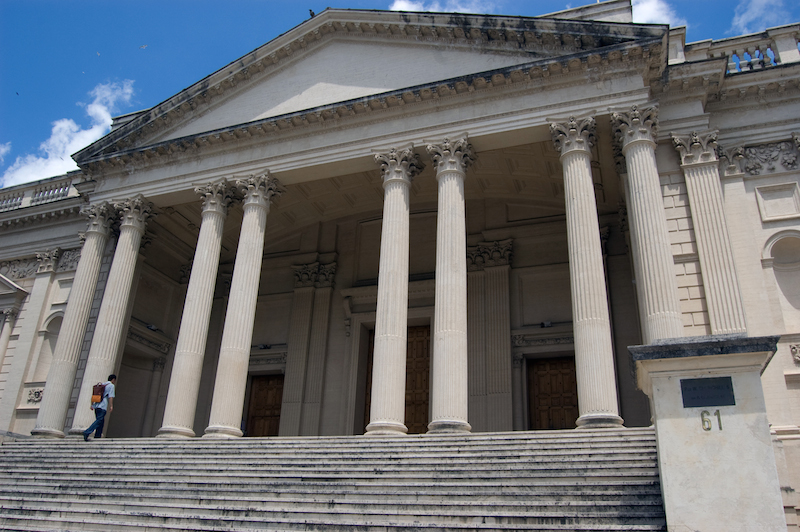
Portico of the British School at Rome in Italy (1916)

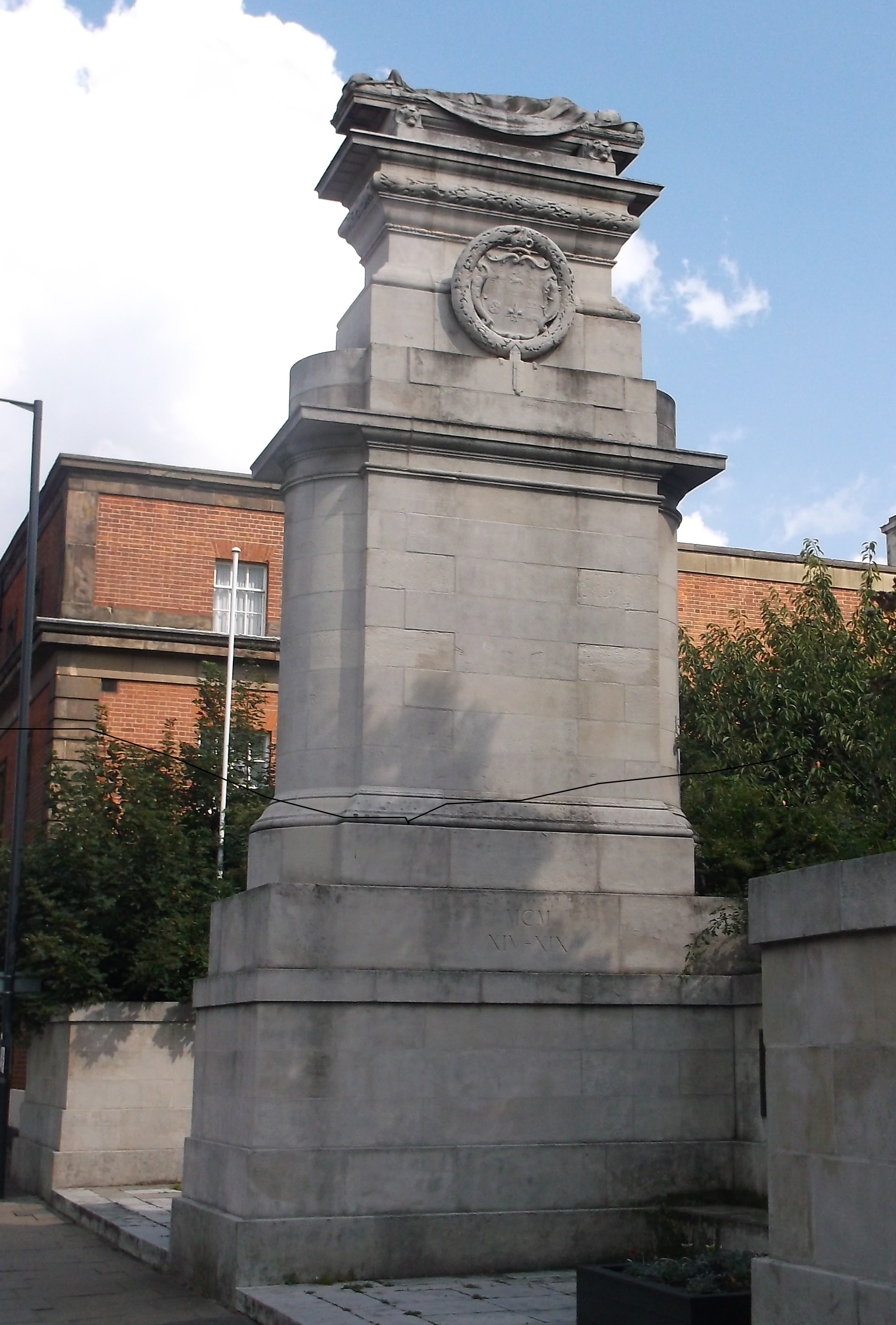
Midland Railway War Memorial, Derby, England, U.K. (1920)

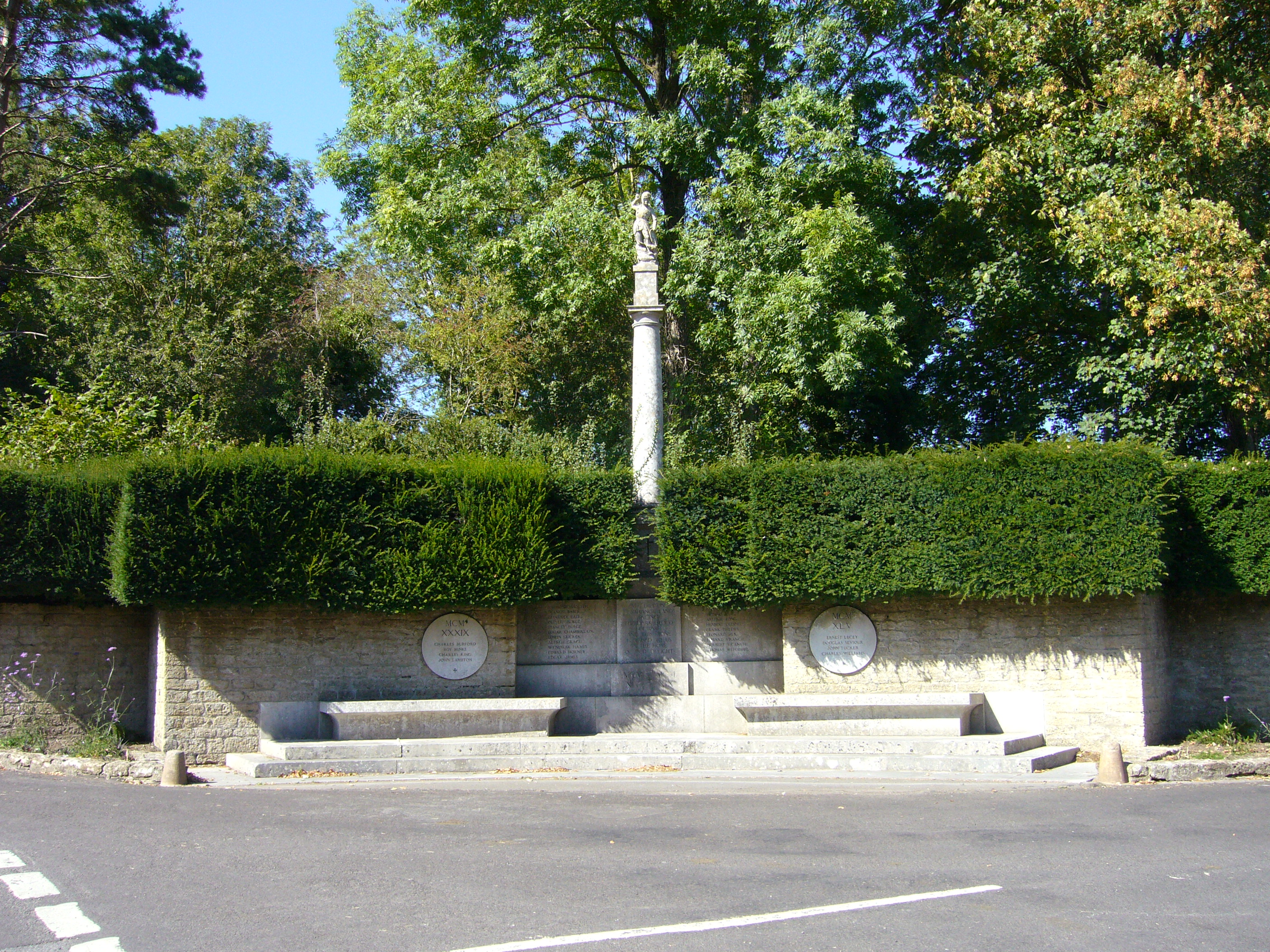
Mells War Memorial, Somerset, England, U.K. (1921)

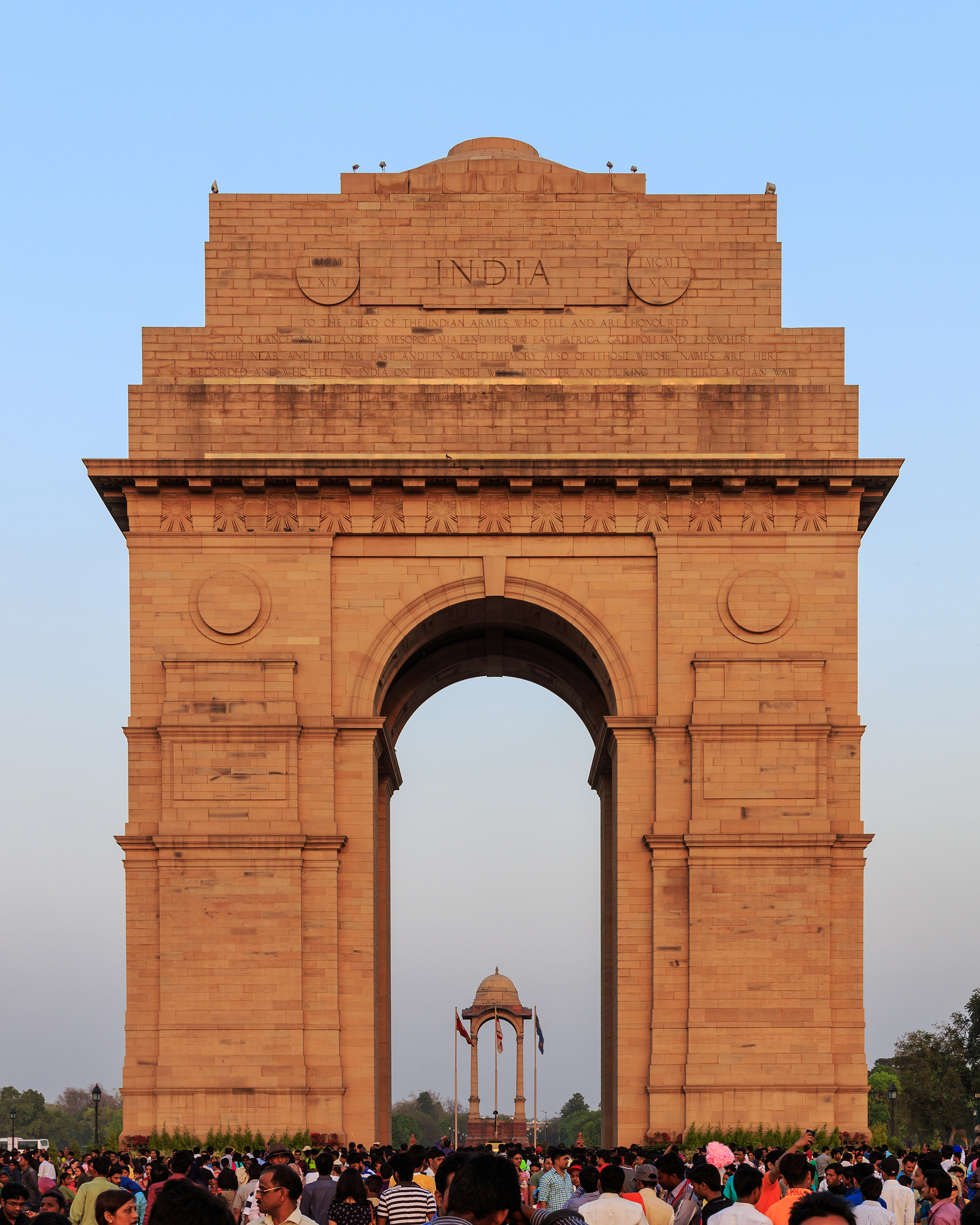
The India Gate, New Delhi, India (1921)

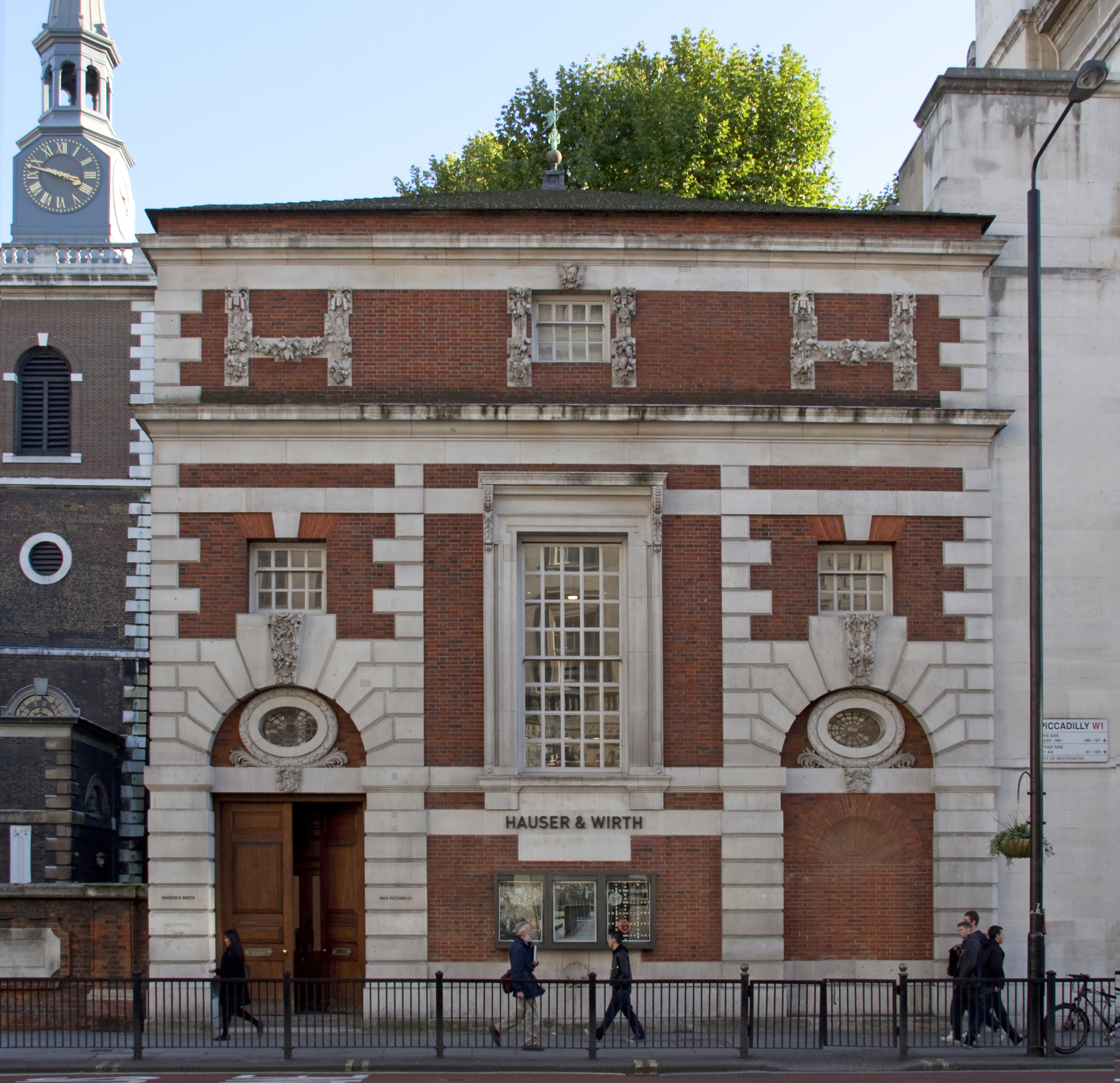
Midland Bank, Piccadilly, London, England, U.K. (1922–1923)

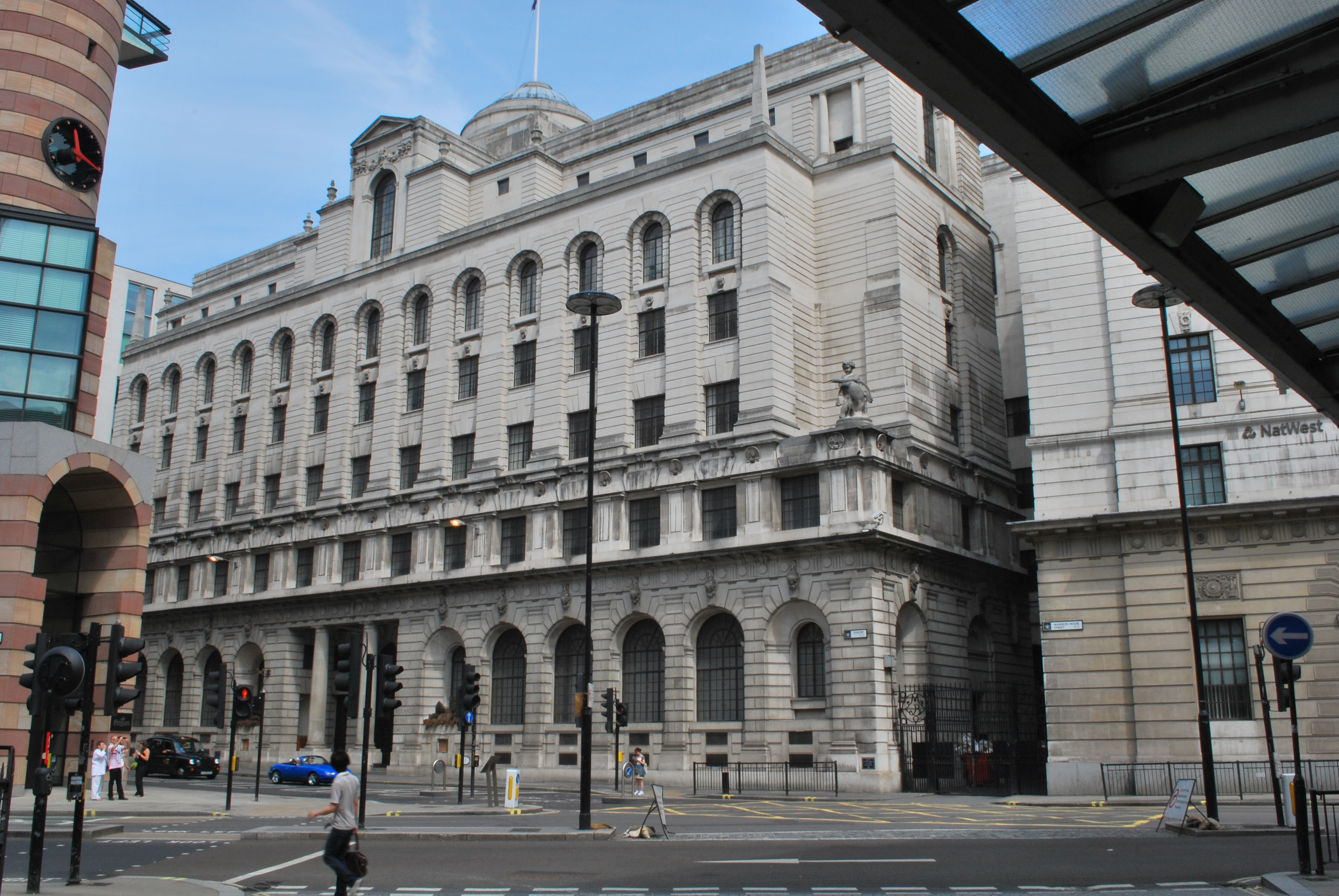
Midland Bank Headquarters, Poultry, London, England, U.K. (1924)

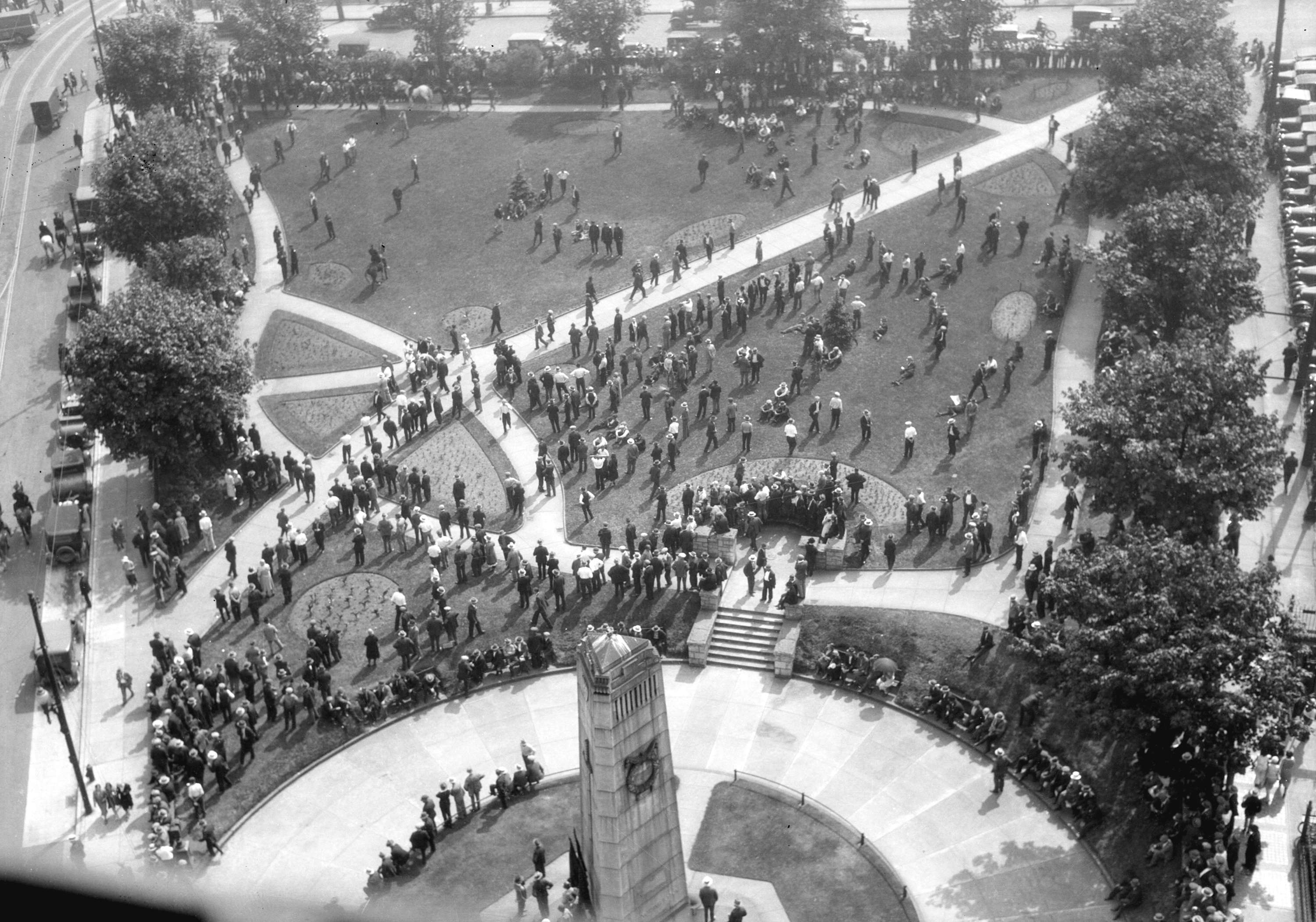
Victory Square Cenotaph, Vancouver, Canada (1924)

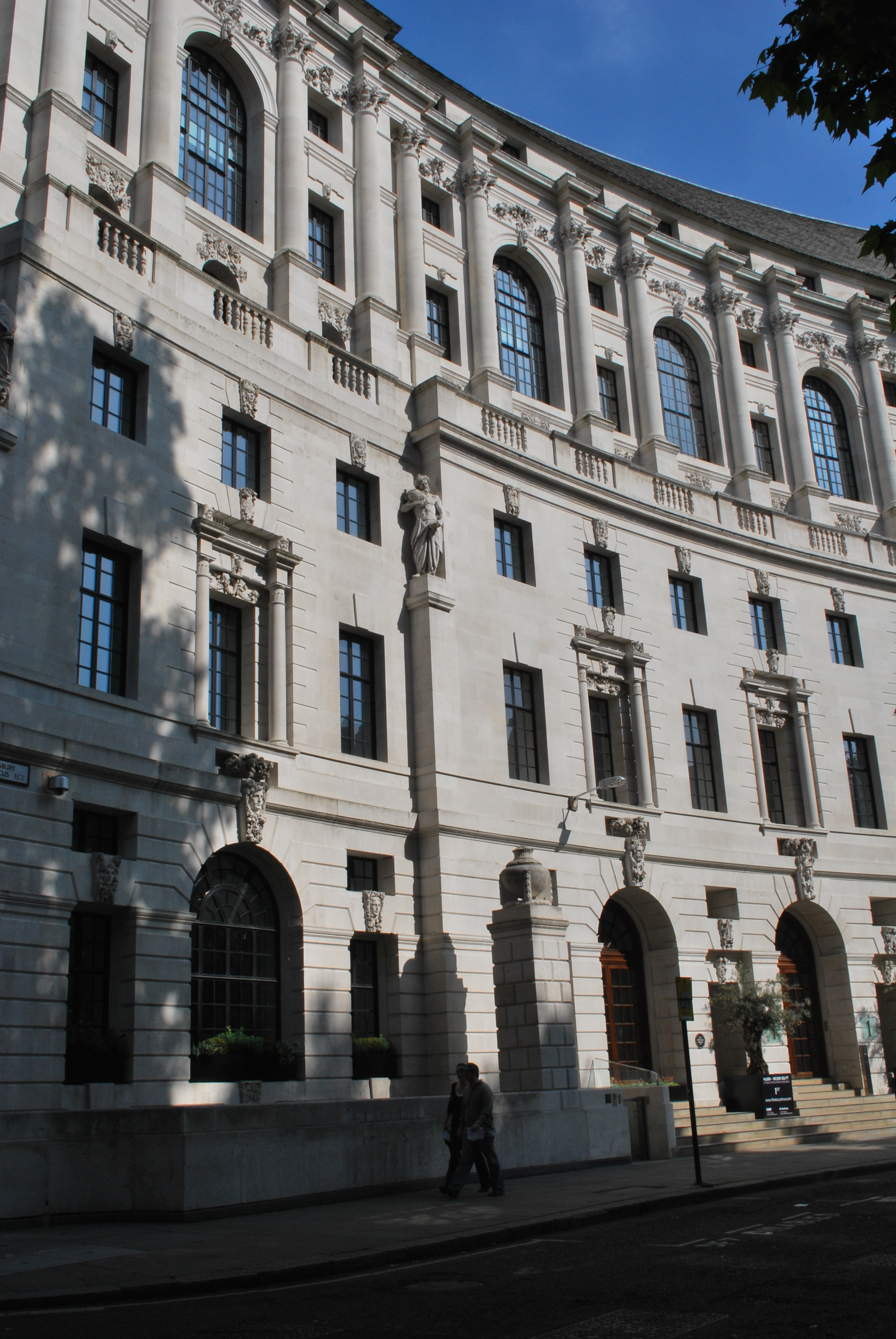
Britannic House, Finsbury Circus, London, England, U.K. (1921–1925)

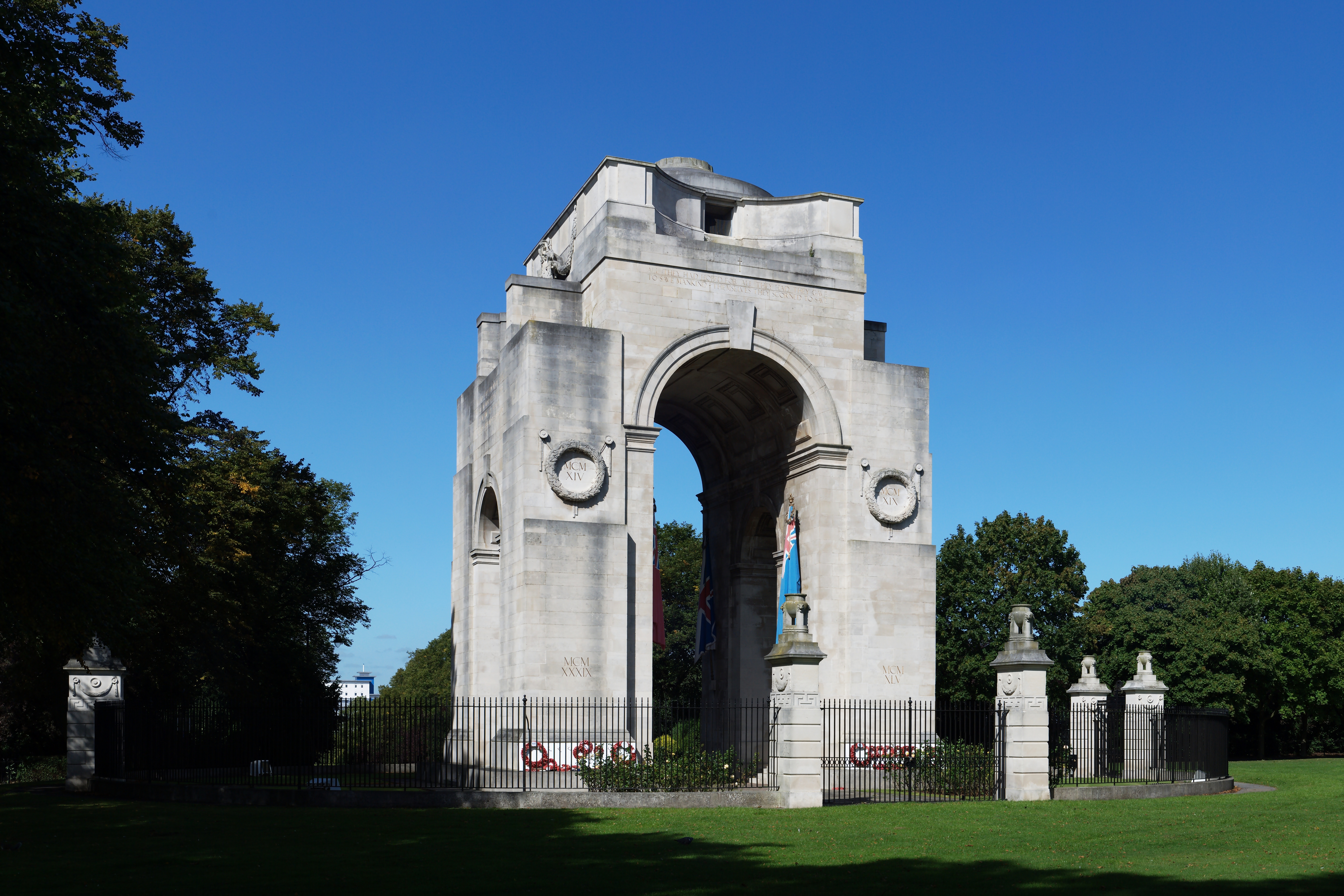
Arch of Remembrance, Leicester, England, U.K. (1925)

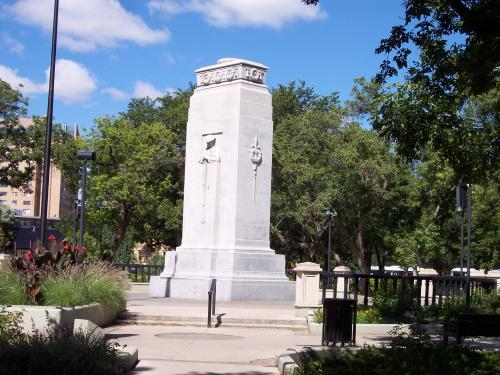
Cenotaph, Regina, Saskatchewan, Canada (1926)

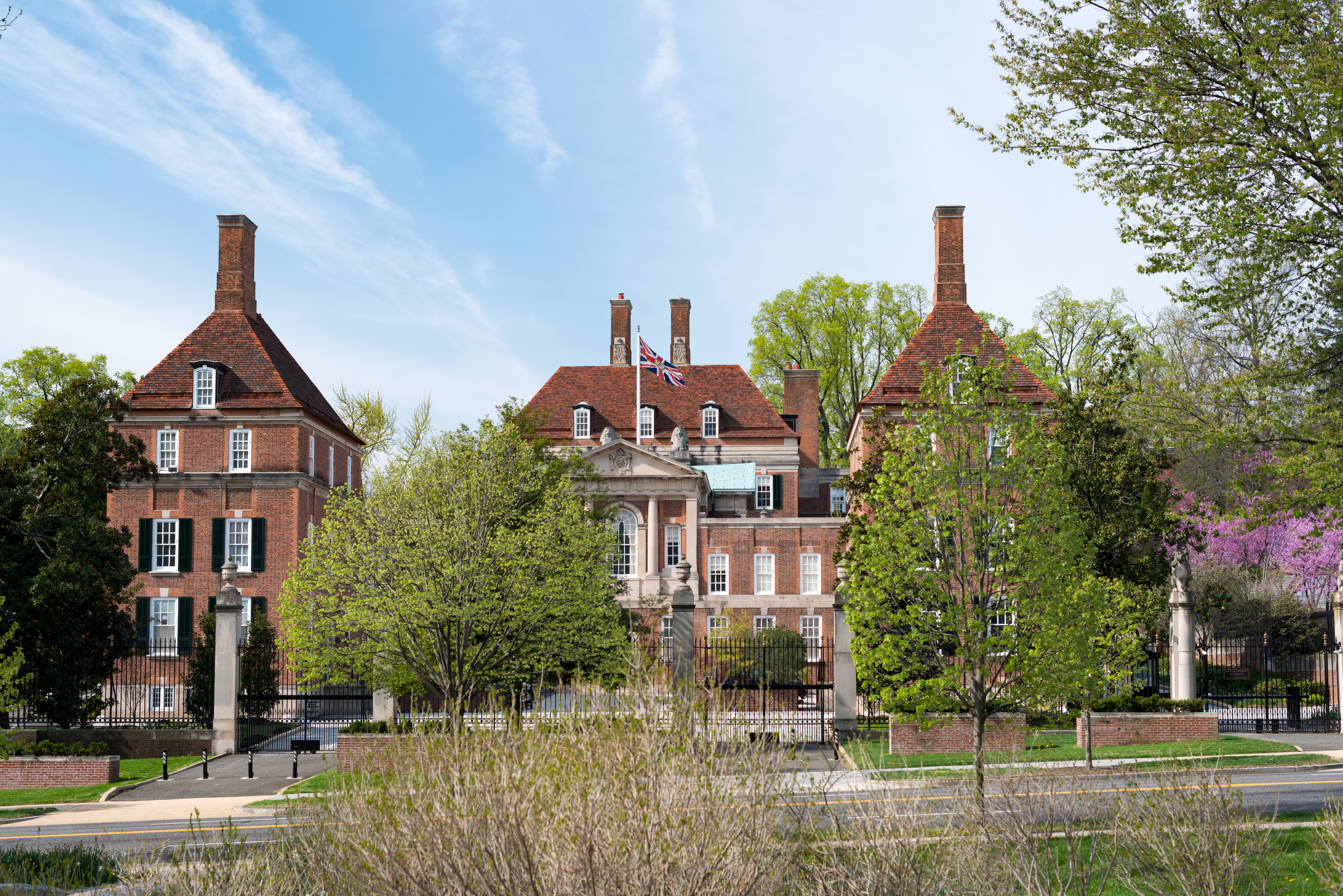
British Ambassador's residence, Washington, D.C., U.S. (1928)

Hallway in British Ambassador's residence Washington, D.C., U.S. (1928)

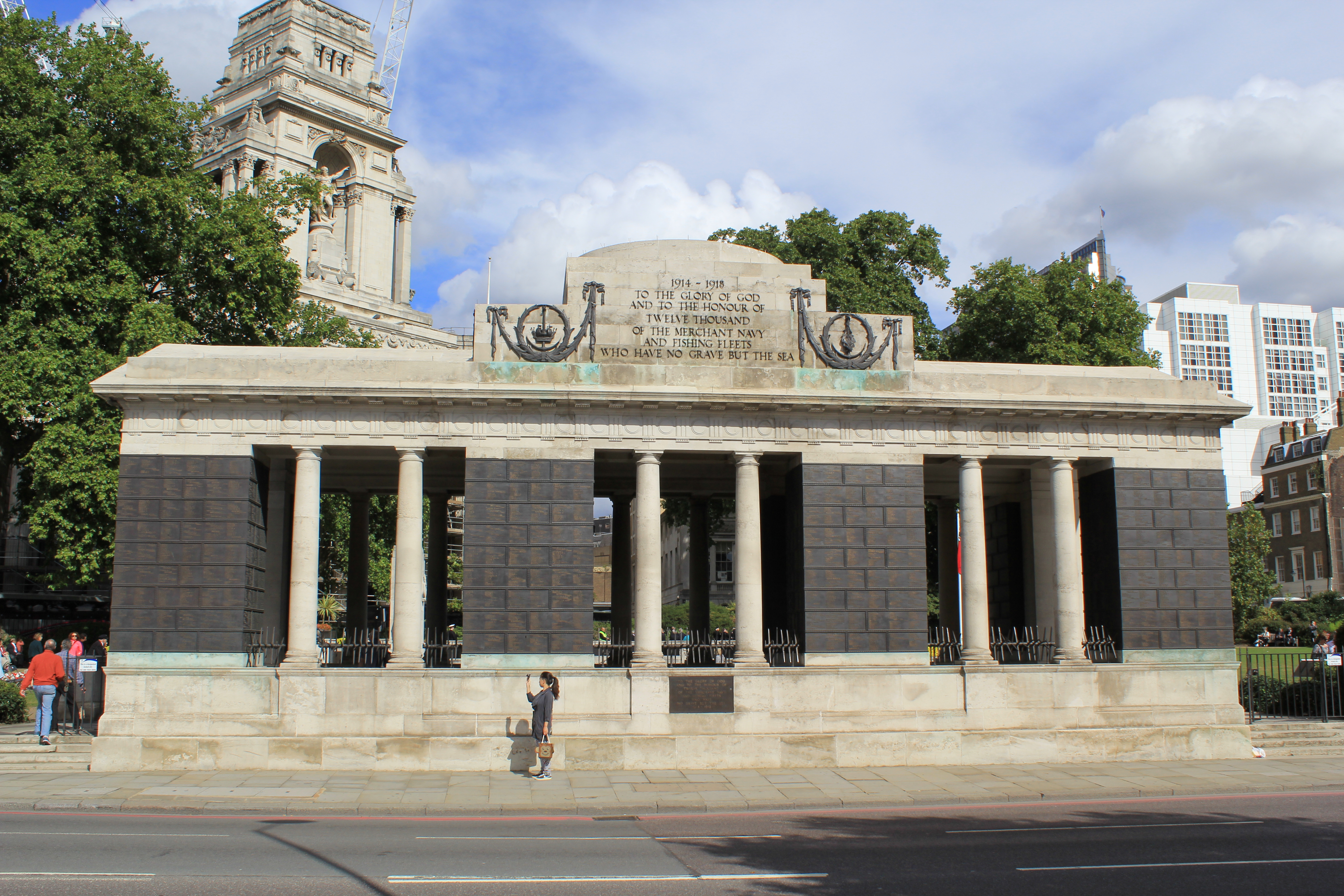
Tower Hill Memorial, Trinity Square, London, England, U.K. (1928)

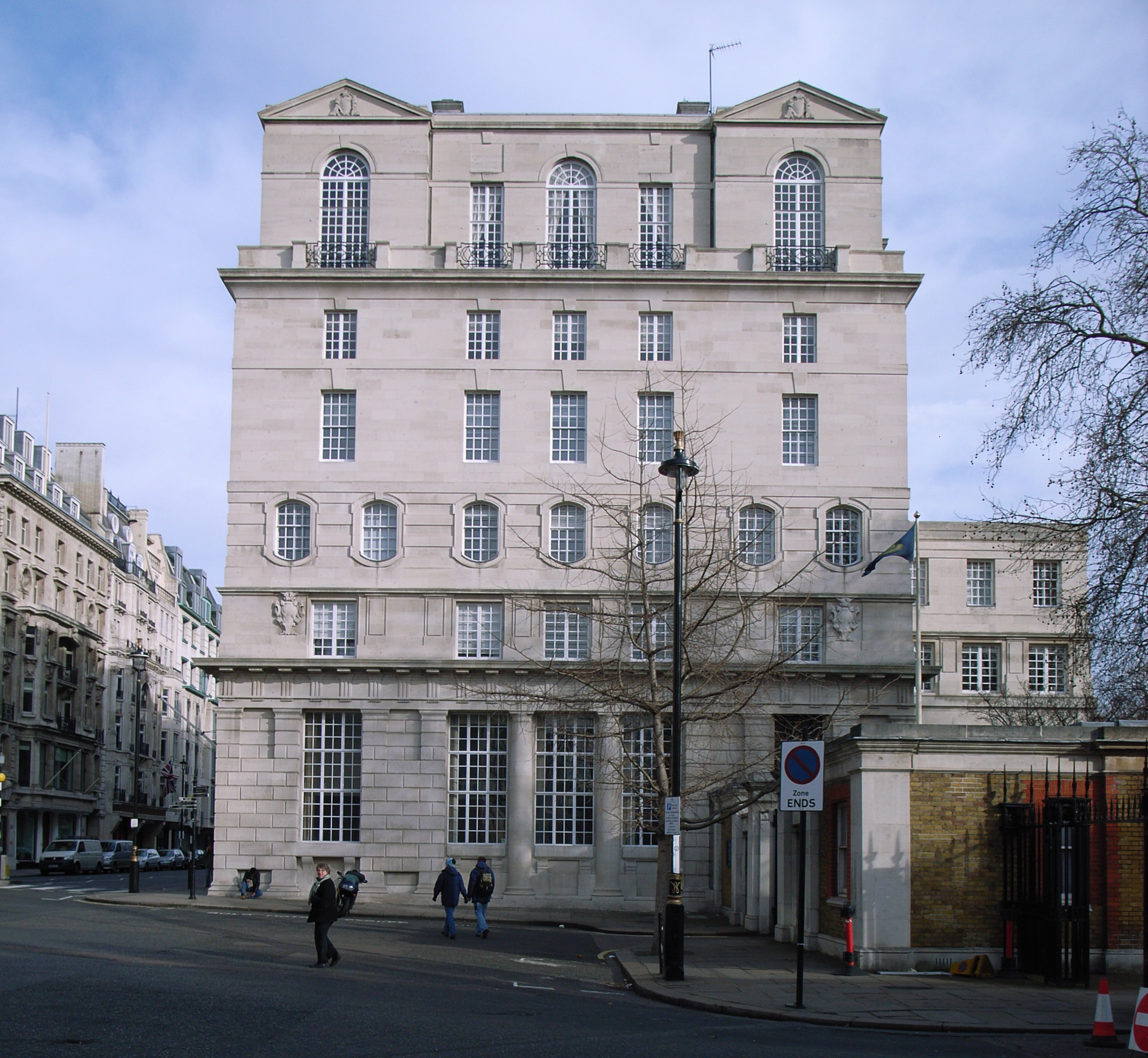
67–68 Pall Mall, London, England, U.K. (1928)

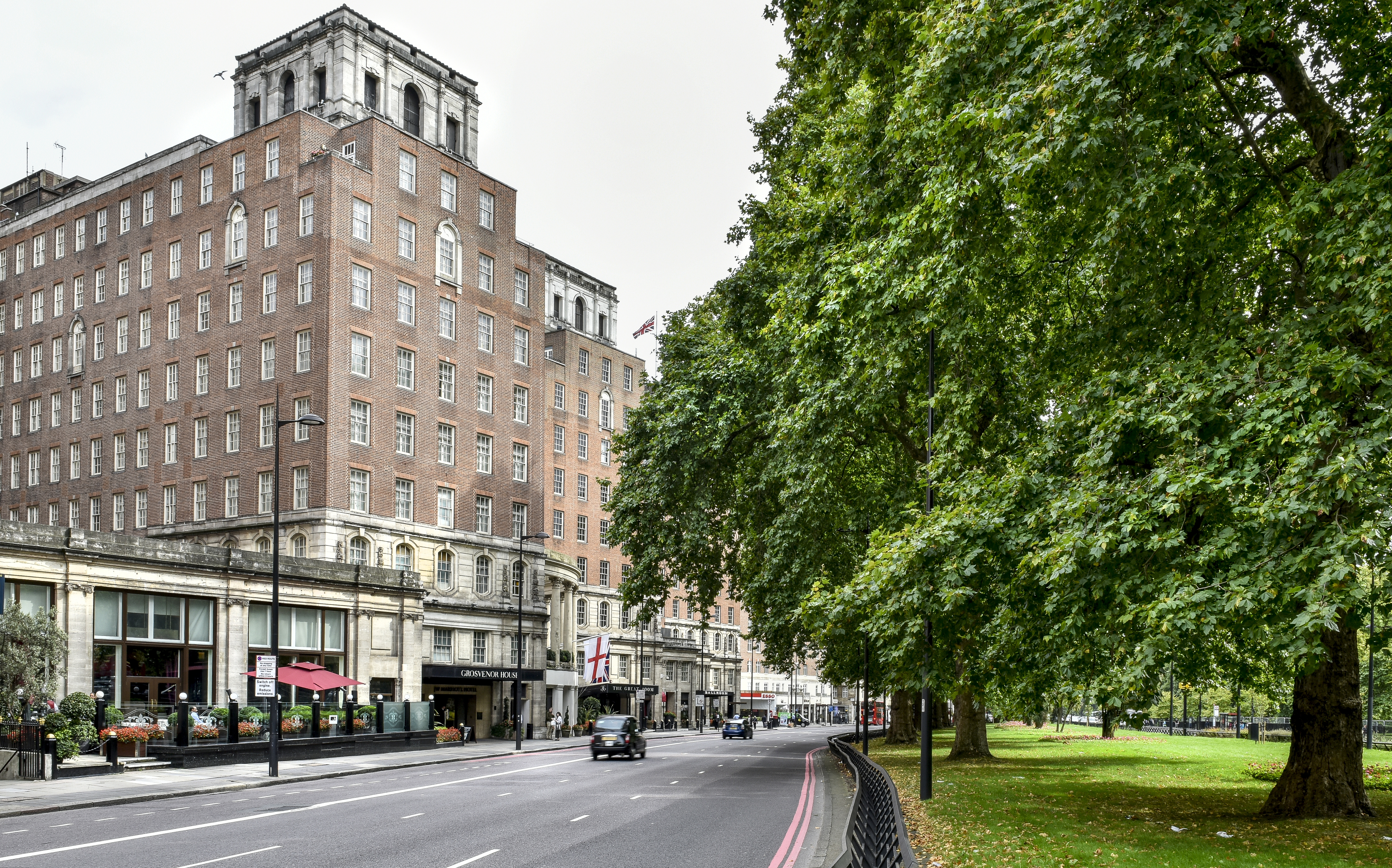
Grosvenor House Hotel, Mayfair, London, England, U.K. (1929)

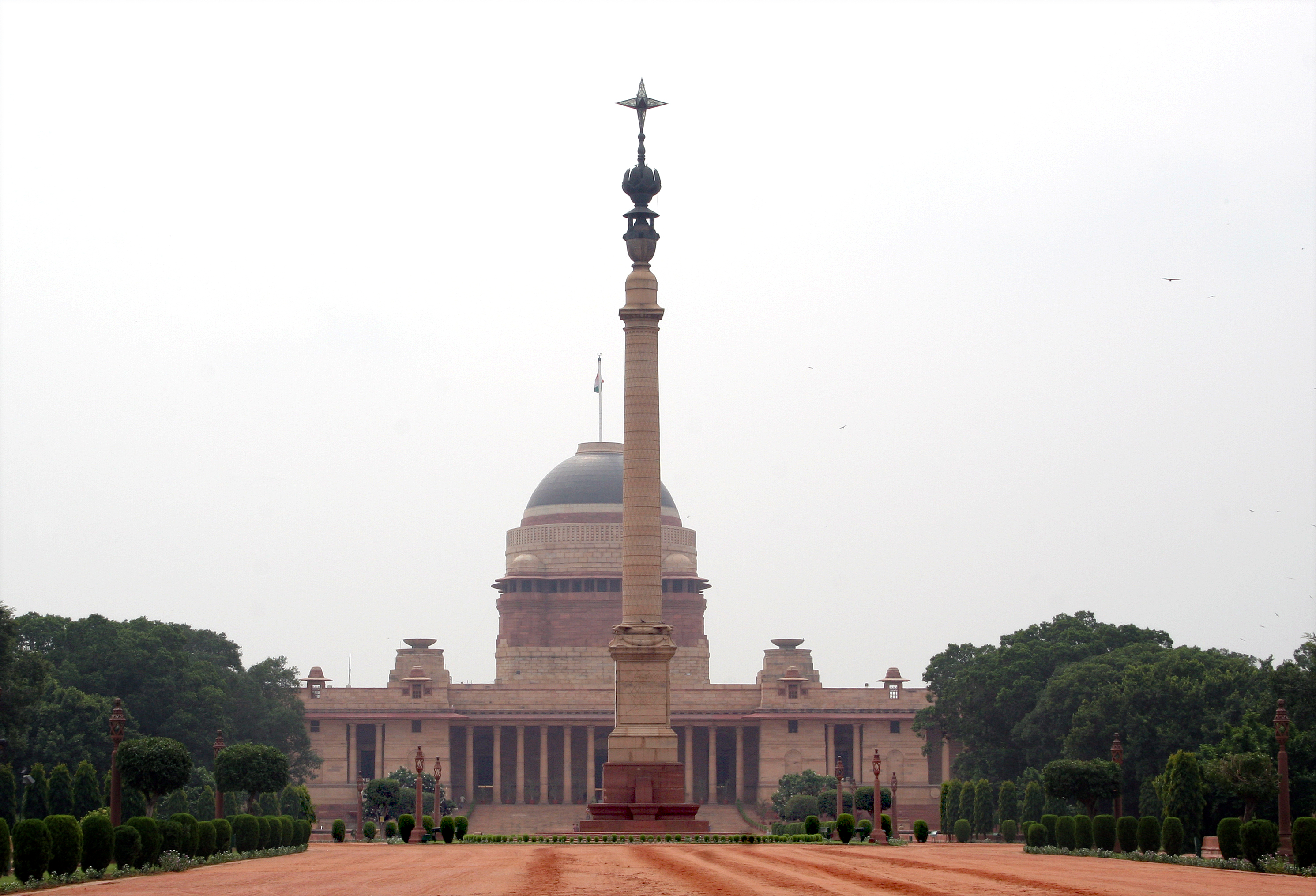
Rashtrapati Bhavan, New Delhi, India (1912–1929)

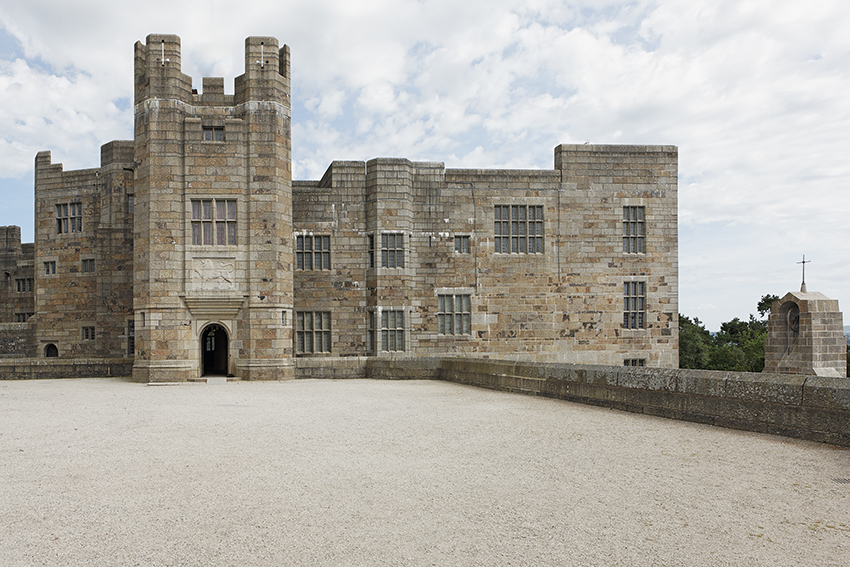
Castle Drogo, Devon, England, U.K. (1911–1930)

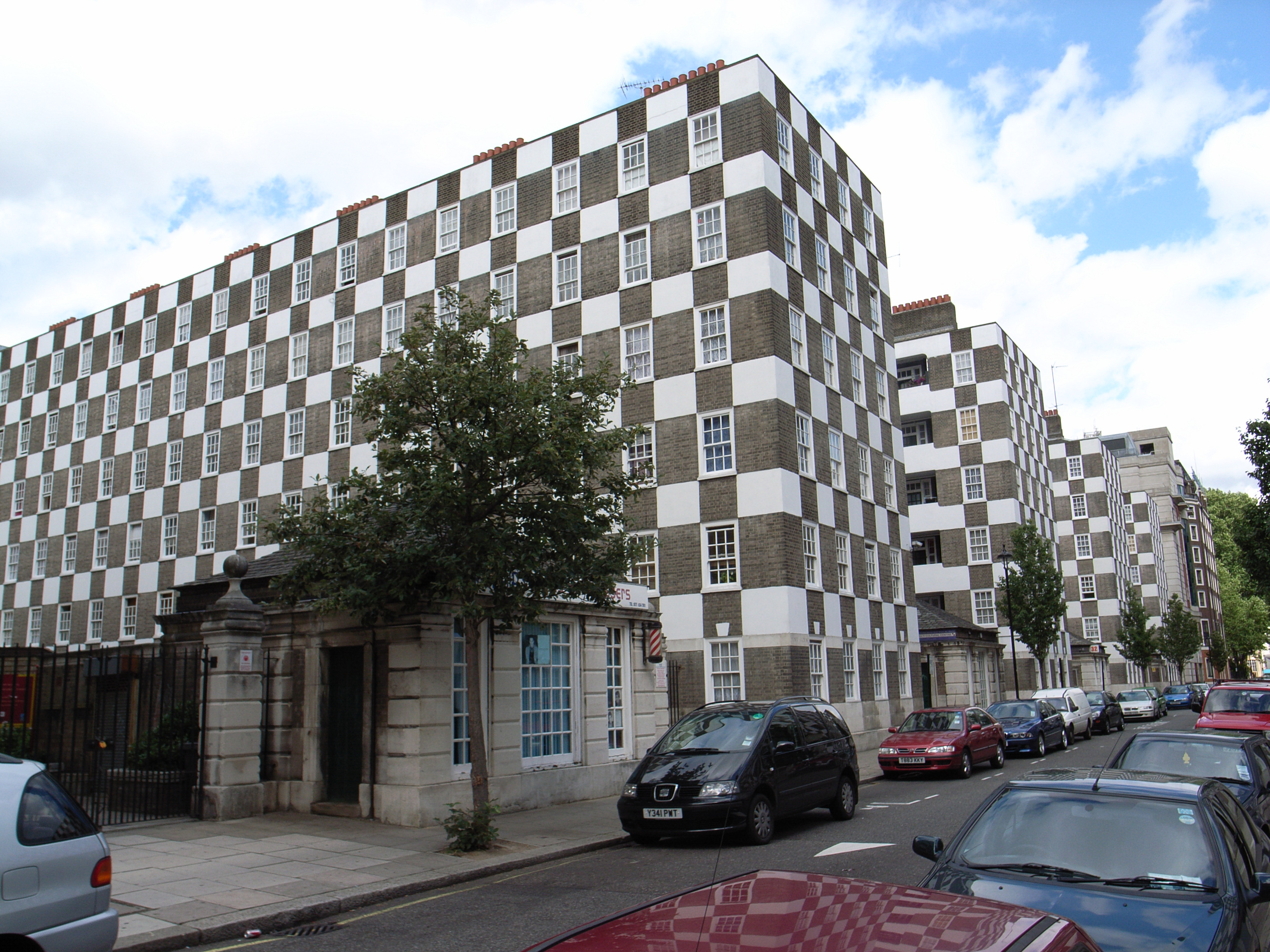
Social housing for Grosvenor Estate and Westminster Council, Page Street, London, England, U.K. (1928–1930)

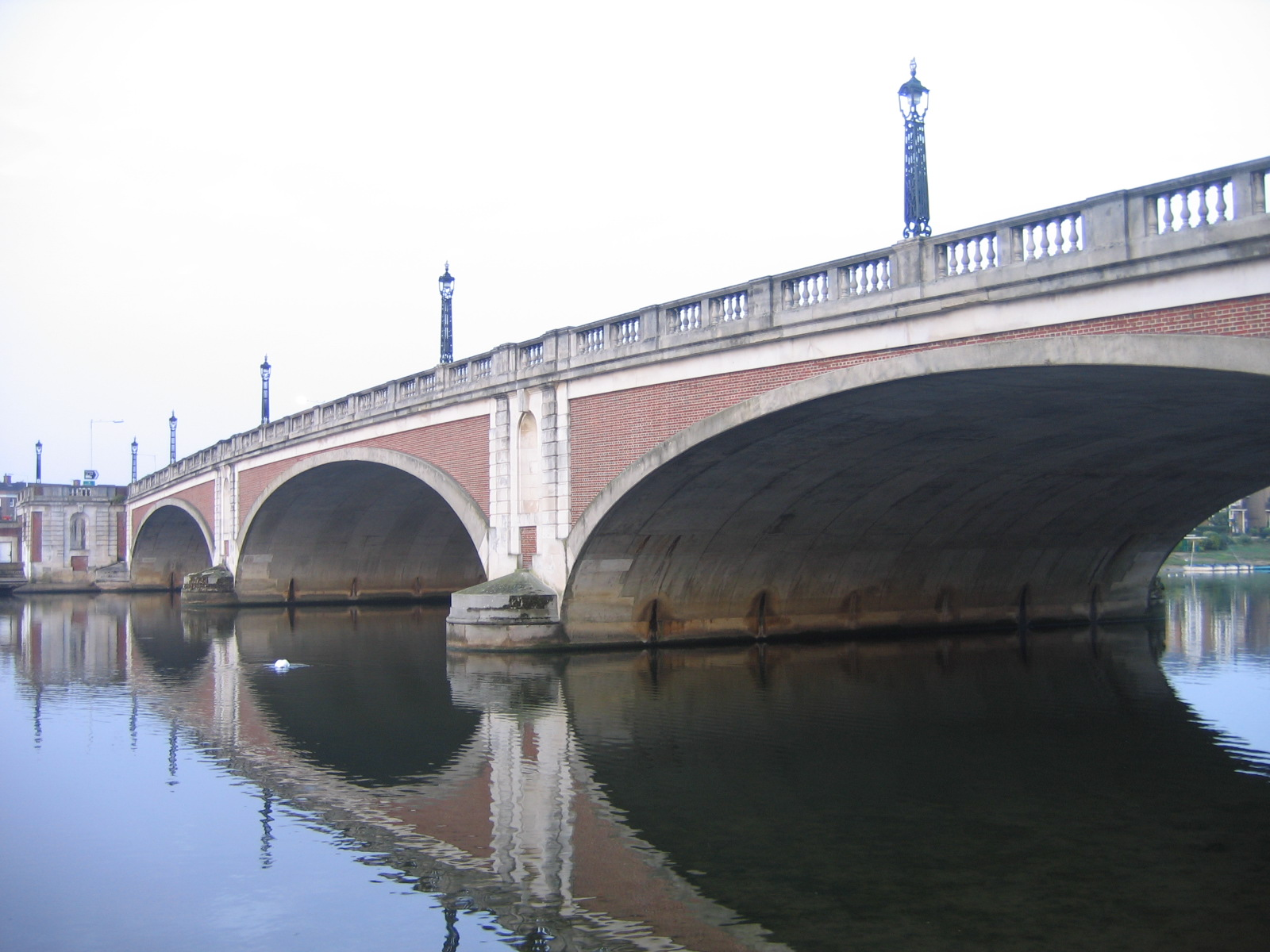
Hampton Court Bridge, London, England, U.K. (1933)

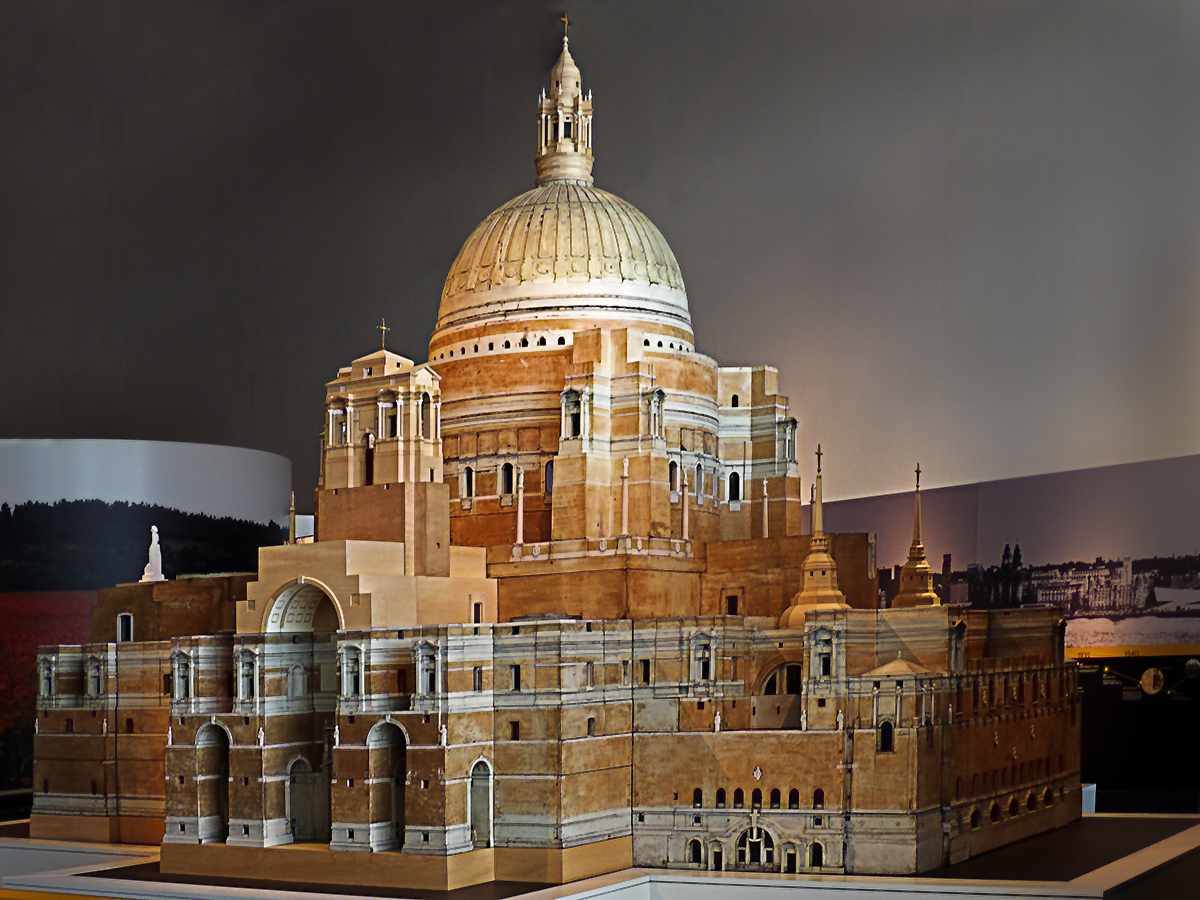
Architectural model of unrealised design for Liverpool Metropolitan Cathedral, Liverpool, England, U.K. (1933)

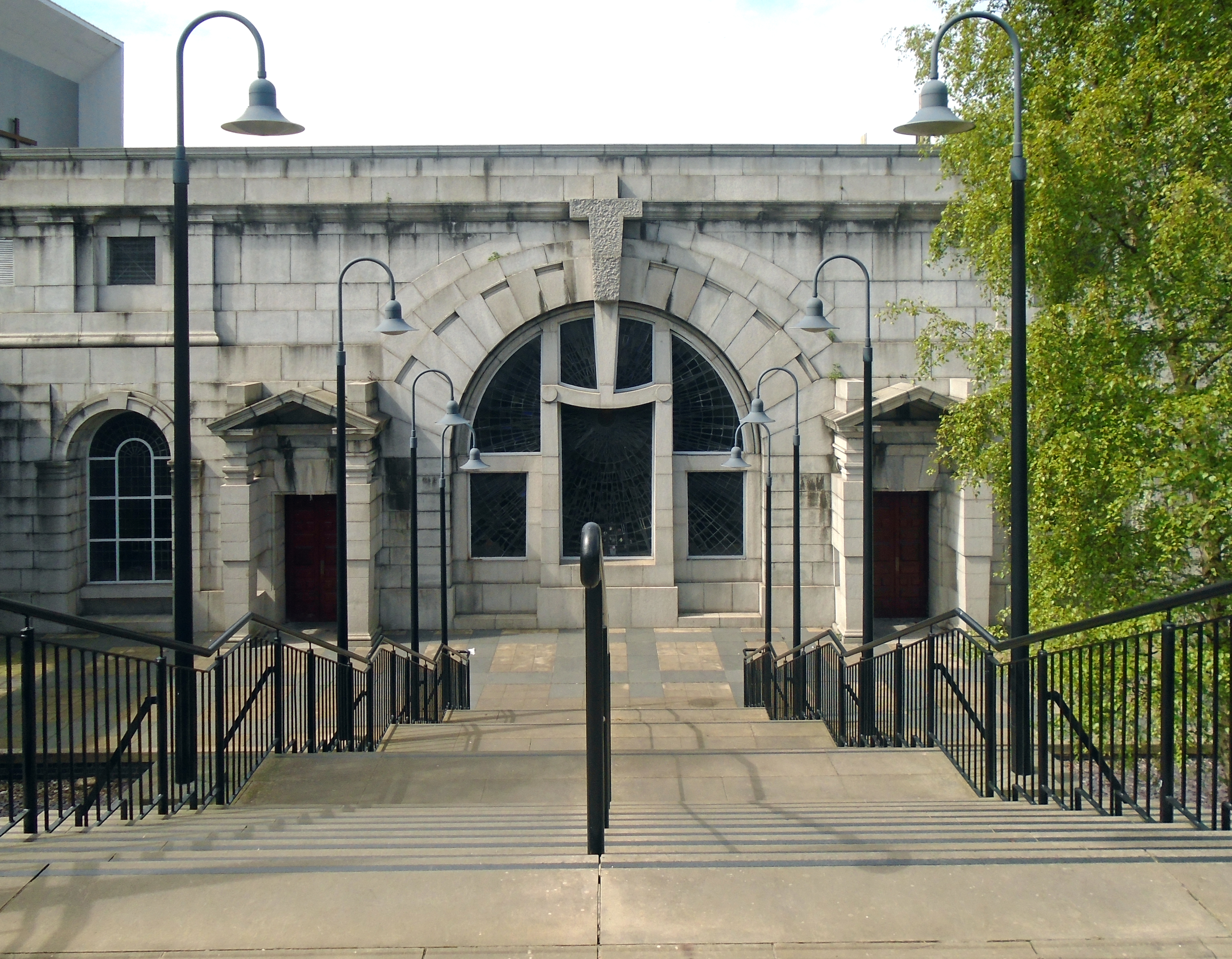
Crypt of Liverpool Metropolitan Cathedral 1933–1941, the only part of Lutyens's design built

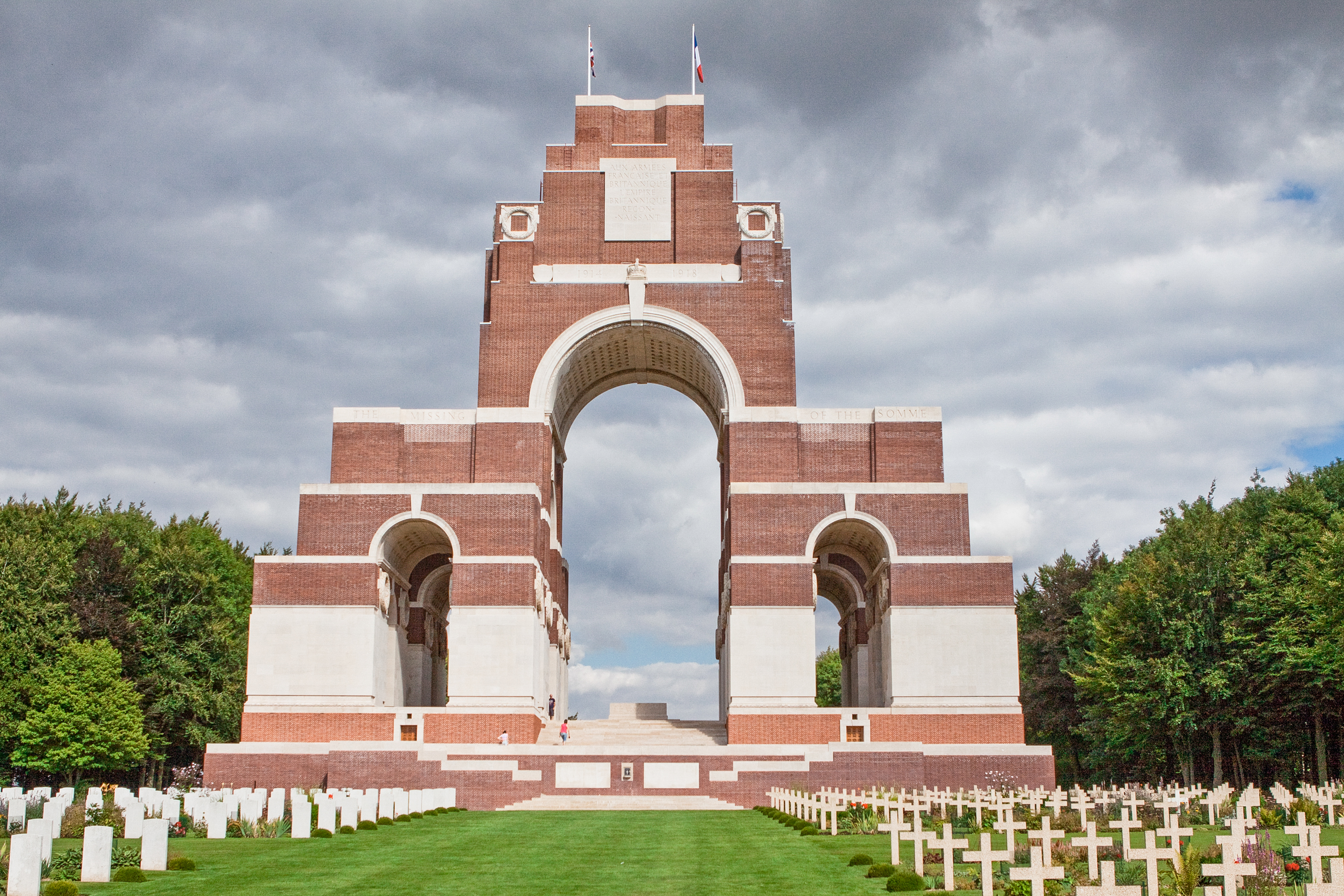
Thiepval Memorial to the Missing of the Somme, France (1928–1932)

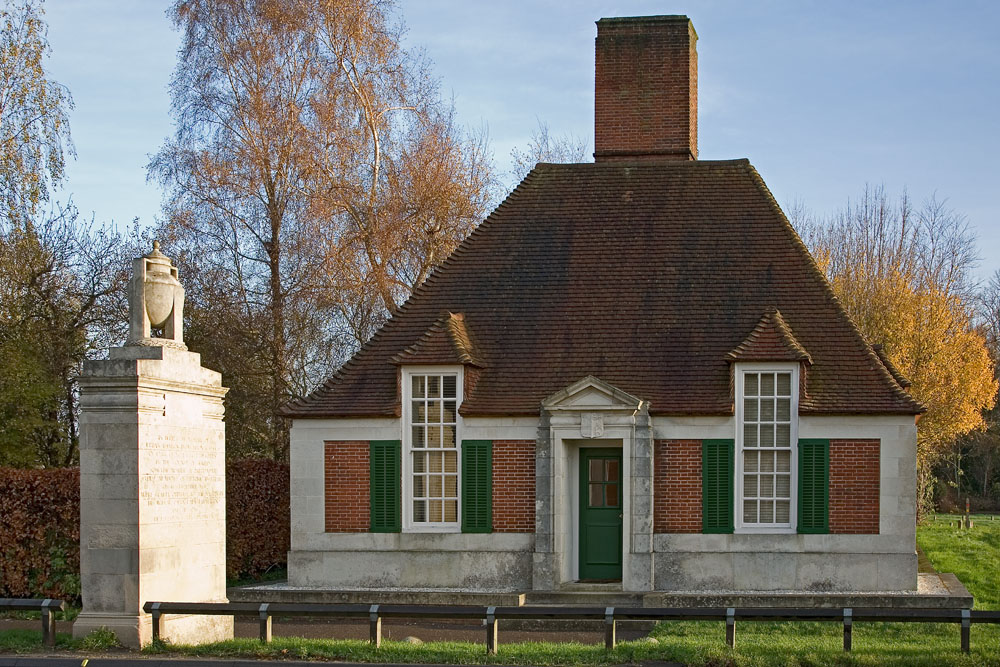
Broughton memorial lodge, Runnymede, Surrey, England, U.K. (1930–1932)

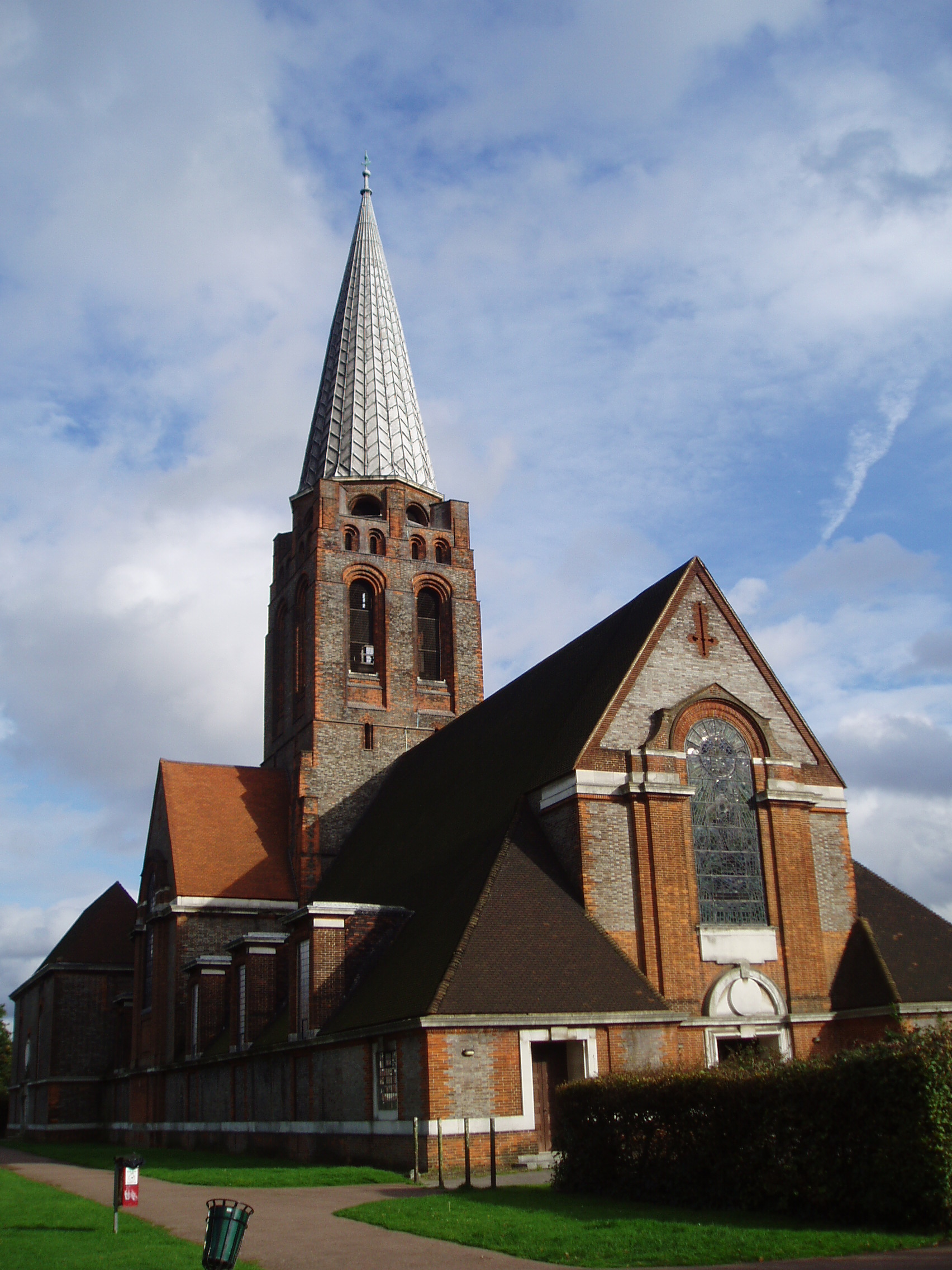
St Jude's Church, Hampstead Garden Suburb, London, England, U.K. (1909–1935)

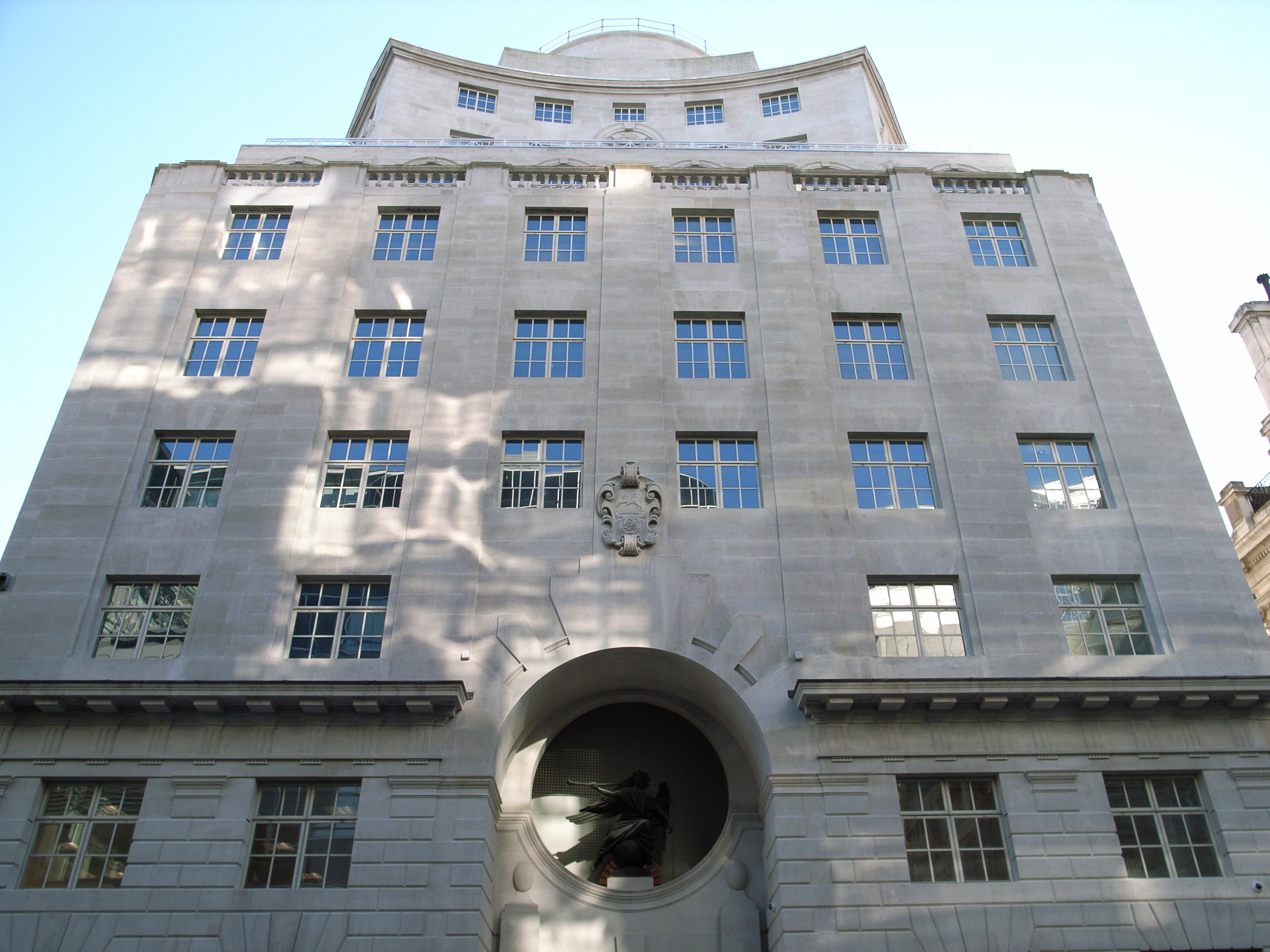
Reuters & Press Association Building, 85 Fleet Street, London, England, U.K(1934–1938)

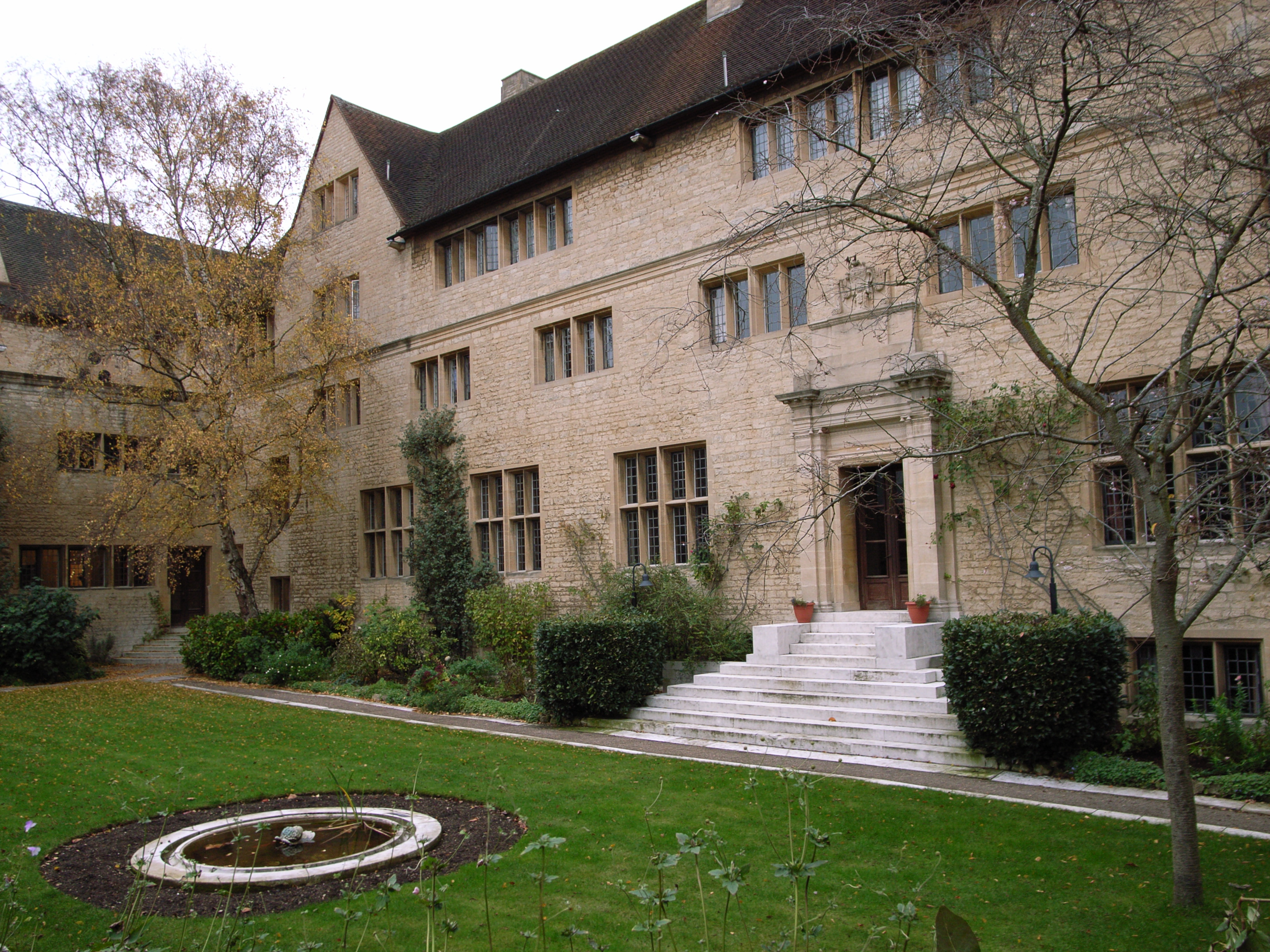
Campion Hall, Oxford, England, U.K. (1936)

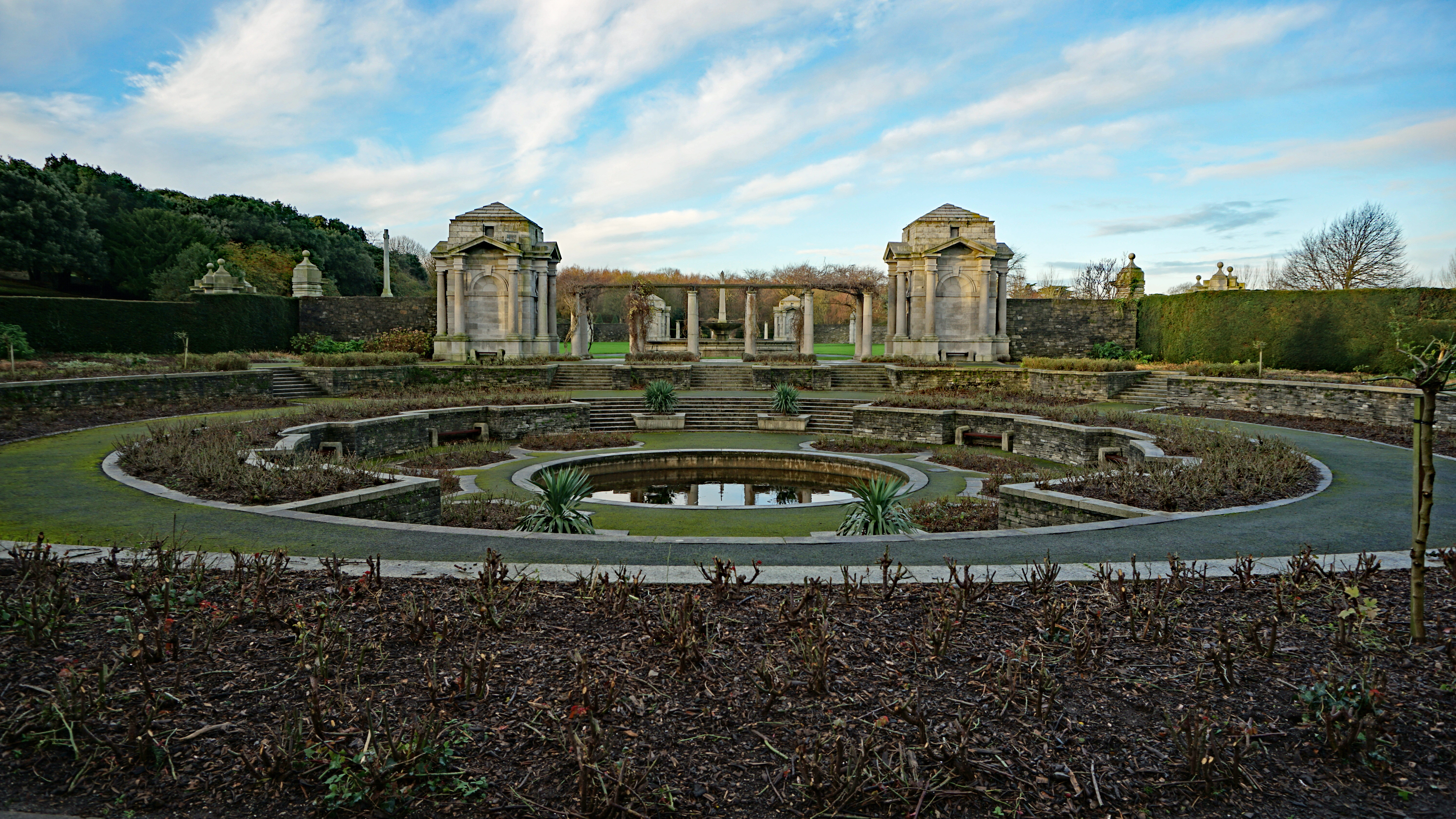
Irish National War Memorial Gardens, Dublin, Ireland (1932–1940)

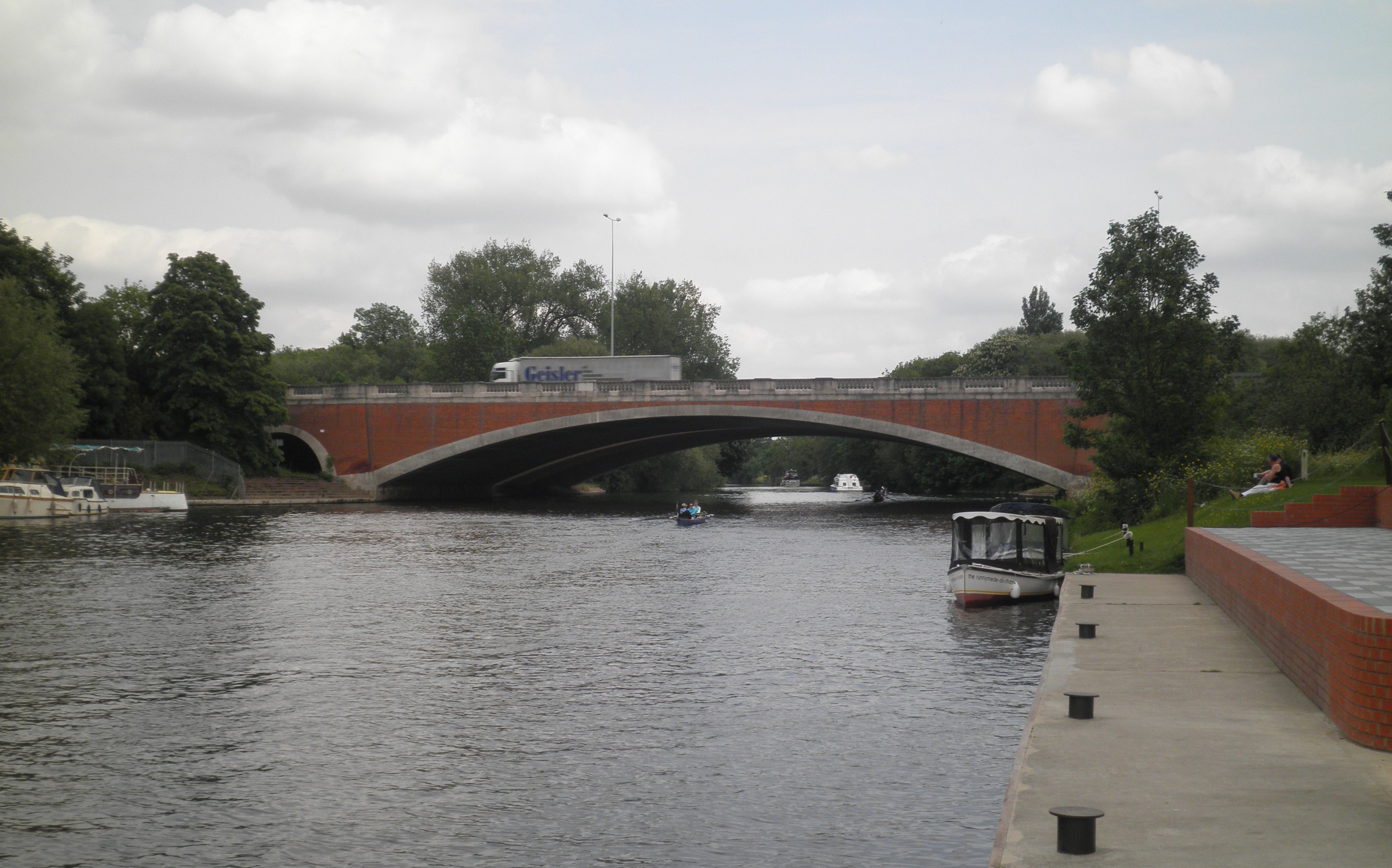
Runnymede Bridge, Surrey, England, U.K. (opened 1961)

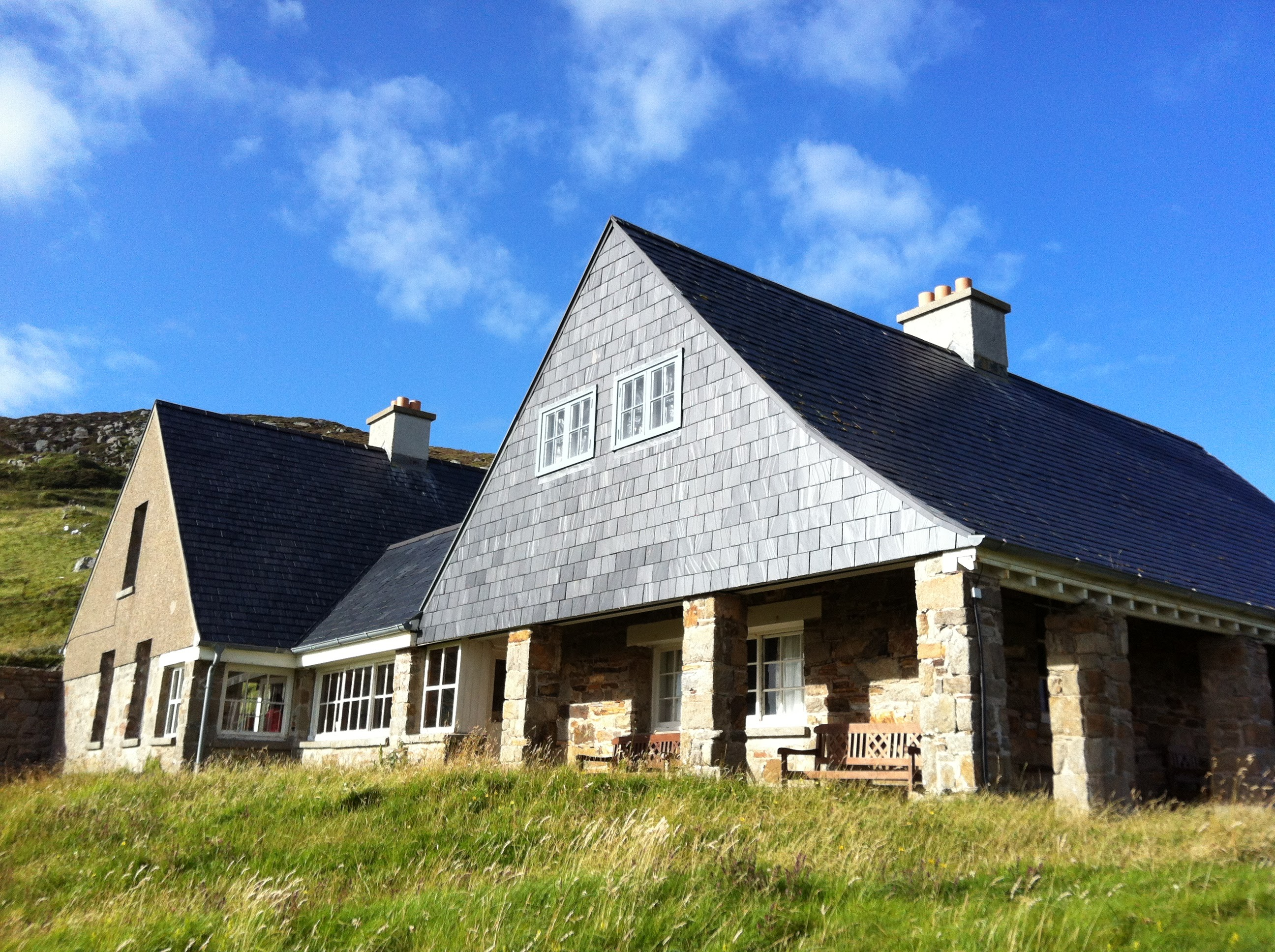
Tranarossan House, Downings, County Donegal, Ireland

== Publications ==
- Charles Bressey & Edwin Lutyens, The Highway Development Survey 1937, Ministry of Transport, 1938.
- Edwin Lutyens & Patrick Abercrombie, A Plan for the City & County of Kingston upon Hull, Brown (London & Hull), 1945.

== See also ==
- Christopher Wren, a architect compared to Lutyens
- Butterfly plan
- History of gardening
- Landscape design history (category)

== Sources ==
- Amery, Colin; Richardson, Margaret; Stamp, Gavin (1981). Lutyens: The Work of the English Architect Sir Edwin Lutyens. London: Arts Council of Great Britain. ISBN 9780728703032.
- Brown, Jane (1997). Lutyens and the Edwardians. London: Penguin Books. ISBN 9780140242690.
- Dunster, David (1986). Edwin Lutyens. London: Academy Editions. ISBN 9780312239183. OCLC 757002578.
- Goodman, David C.; Chant, Colin (1999). European Cities & Technology: Industrial to Post-industrial City. Routledge. ISBN 9780415200820. OCLC 807453904.
- Gradidge, Roderick (1981). Edwin Lutyens: Architect Laureate. London: George Allen & Unwin. ISBN 9780047200236. OCLC 924831360.
- Hussey, Christopher (1989) [1950]. The Life of Sir Edwin Lutyens. Woodbridge: Antique Collectors Club. ISBN 978-0-907462-59-0.
- Irving, Robert Grant (1981). Indian Summer: Lutyens, Baker and Imperial Delhi. London: Yale University Press. ISBN 978-0-300-02422-7.
- Lutyens, Edwin (1989). Clayre Percy; Jane Ridley (eds.). The Letters of Edwin Lutyens to his wife, Lady Emily. London: Hamish Hamilton. ISBN 9780241124765. OCLC 466283124.
- Lutyens, Mary (1980). Edwin Lutyens. London: John Murray. ISBN 978-0-7195-3777-6. OCLC 469680629.
- Muthesius, H. (1979) [1904]. The English House (Single volume ed.). Frogmore: Granada Publishing. ISBN 978-0-258-97101-7.
- Nairn, Ian; Pevsner, Nikolaus; Cherry, Bridget (1971). Surrey. The Buildings of England. Middlesex, England: Penguin Books. ISBN 978-0-300-09675-0.
- Newman, John (2013). Kent: North East and East. The Buildings of England. London and New Haven, CT: Yale University Press. ISBN 9780300185065.
- Pile, John F. (2005). A History of Interior Design. Laurence King Publishing. ISBN 9781856694186.
- Ridley, Jane (2002). Edwin Lutyens: His Life, His Wife, His Work. London: Chatto & Windus. ISBN 978-0-7011-7201-5.
- Stamp, Gavin (2006). The Memorial to the Missing of the Somme (2007 ed.). London: Profile Books. ISBN 978-1-86197-896-7.
- Vale, Lawrence J. (1992). Architecture, Power, and National Identity. New Haven and London: Yale University Press. ISBN 9780300049589.
- Wilhide, Elizabeth (2000). Sir Edwin Lutyens: Designing in the English Tradition. London: Pavilion Books. ISBN 9781857936889. OCLC 469379799.

Cultural offices
Preceded by Sir William Llewellyn	President of the Royal Academy; 1938–1944	Succeeded by Alfred Munnings
Court offices
Preceded by Sir Malcolm Fraser, 1st Baronet	Registrar of the Imperial Society of Knights Bachelor; 1941–1944	Succeeded by Sir Thomas Lumley-Smith
