= Tigbourne Court =

House in Wormley, Surrey

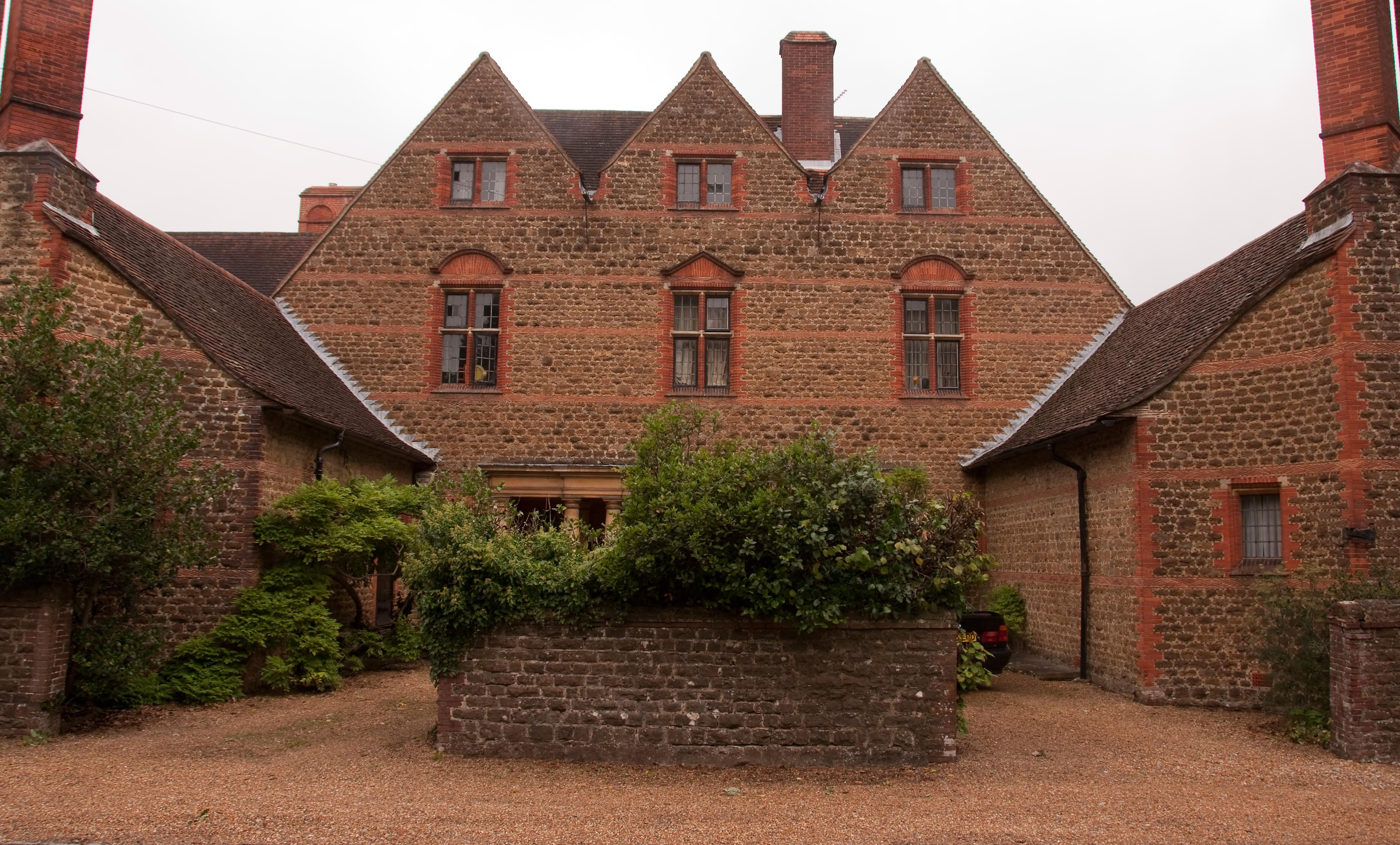
- Tigbourne Court, entrance front, from the southwest

- Location within Surrey
- 51°07′57″N 0°38′02″W
- Location: Wormley, Surrey
- OS grid reference: SU 95675 37910

History
- Built: 1899–1901

Site notes
- Architect: Edwin Lutyens
- Architectural style: Arts and Crafts style

Listed Building – Grade I
- Designated: 9 March 1960
- Reference no.: 1240229

Tigbourne Court is an Arts and Crafts style country house in Wormley, Surrey, England, 1 mile (1.6 km) south of Witley. It was designed by architect Edwin Lutyens, using a mixture of 17th-century style vernacular architecture and classical elements, and has been called "probably his best" building, for its architectural geometry, wit and texture. It was completed in 1901. English Heritage have designated it a Grade I listed building.

== History ==
The 3-acre (1.2 ha) plot of land on which Tigbourne Court was built was originally part of Tigbourne Farm. First recorded in the 14th century as Tykebourne, it appears in records from the 17th century as Tickborne, Tikbourne and Titchbourne. The name is thought to derive from the Old English ticcen meaning "kid" (i.e. a young goat) and bourne meaning "stream". The name may also indicate a historical connection to Tichborne in Hampshire. Tigbourne Farm House, parts of which date from the 15th century, still stands to the southwest of Tigbourne Court and is Grade II listed.

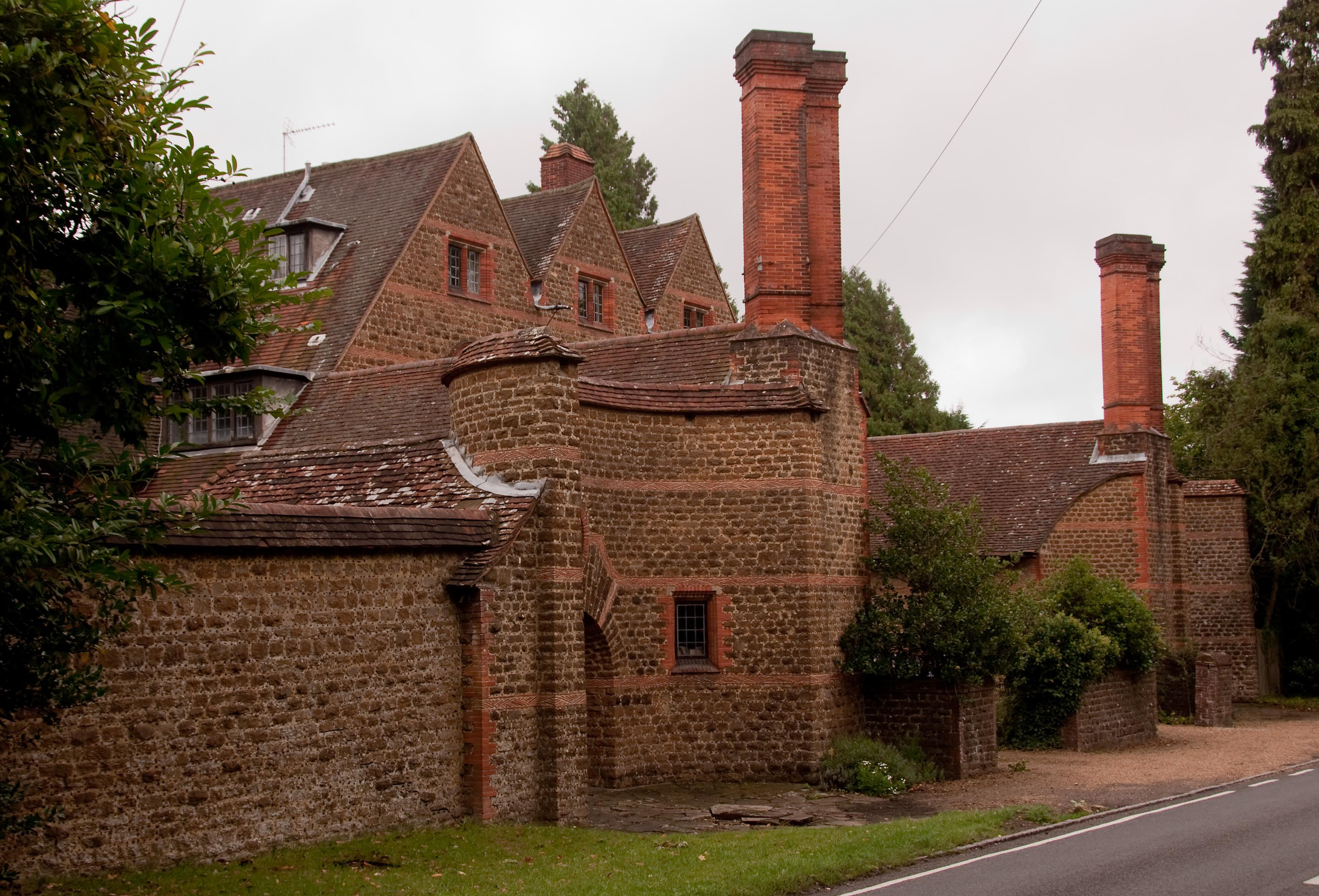
The western side of the house, viewed from the north. The pairs of chimneys are positioned at the ends of the north and south wings.

Edwin Lutyens designed Tigbourne Court in 1899 for businessman Edgar Horne. Horne later became the chairman of the Prudential Assurance Company and Member of Parliament for Guildford. (Note: Gerald Balfour, the future Earl of Balfour, viewed Tigbourne Court as it was being built, was impressed, and commissioned Fisher's Hill House, Woking from Lutyens in 1900.) Lutyens was assisted by his business partner E. Baynes Badcock, who was responsible for inspecting the building as the construction progressed, and by Norman Evill, who drew the architectural plans. However, by the start of 1901, faults in the building work had created an "awful mess" and Lutyens wrote in his journal that Horne was "very cross". He blamed Badcock for the construction problems both at Tigbourne Court and elsewhere, and the partnership between the two men ended in March of the same year.

Horne never moved into Tigbourne Court and, in September 1901, it was let to the fraudster Whitaker Wright. The writer, Newton Wethered, owned the house between 1905 and 1934. The single-storey billiard room, at the rear of the house, was added in 1910 and was designed by Horace Farquharson. In 1968, Tigbourne Court was purchased by Maggie Smith, her then husband, Robert Stephens, and her brother and sister-in-law. They partitioned the house, so that Smith and Stephens could live in the main part and the other couple in the servants' quarters. The family sold the property in 1981 for £185,000, having bought it for £37,000 thirteen years earlier.

Tigbourne Court is privately owned.

== House ==
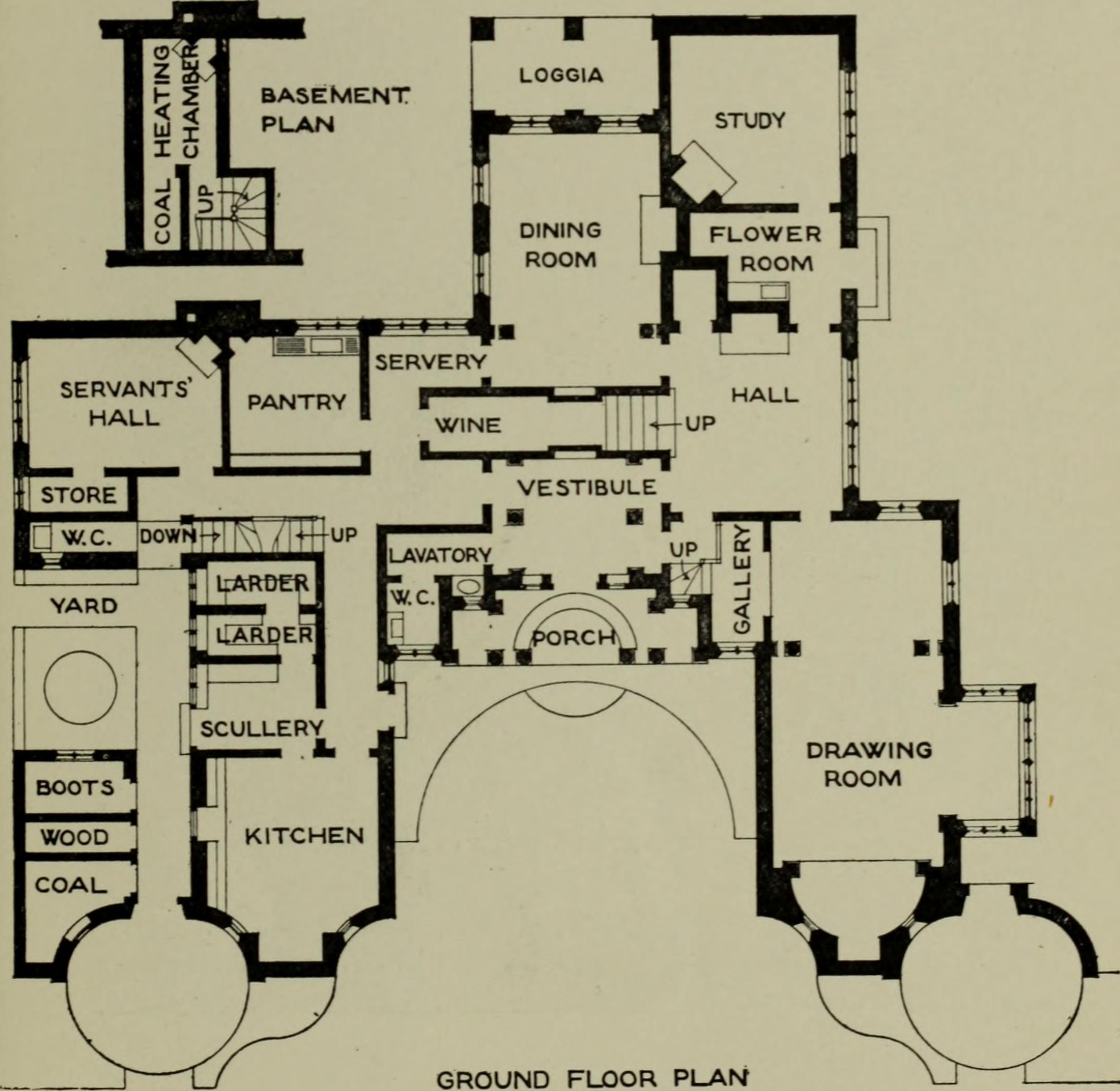
Ground floor plan (north is to the left)

Tigbourne Court was conceived by Edwin Lutyens in the spirit of the Arts and Crafts movement, combining architectural styles from the Tudor period and the 17th century. The house has a strong geometric layout that Lutyens' biographer, Christopher Hussey, suggests was influenced by the ideas of John Thorpe. The walls are primarily of local Bargate stone with galleting of the mortar using pieces of ironstone.

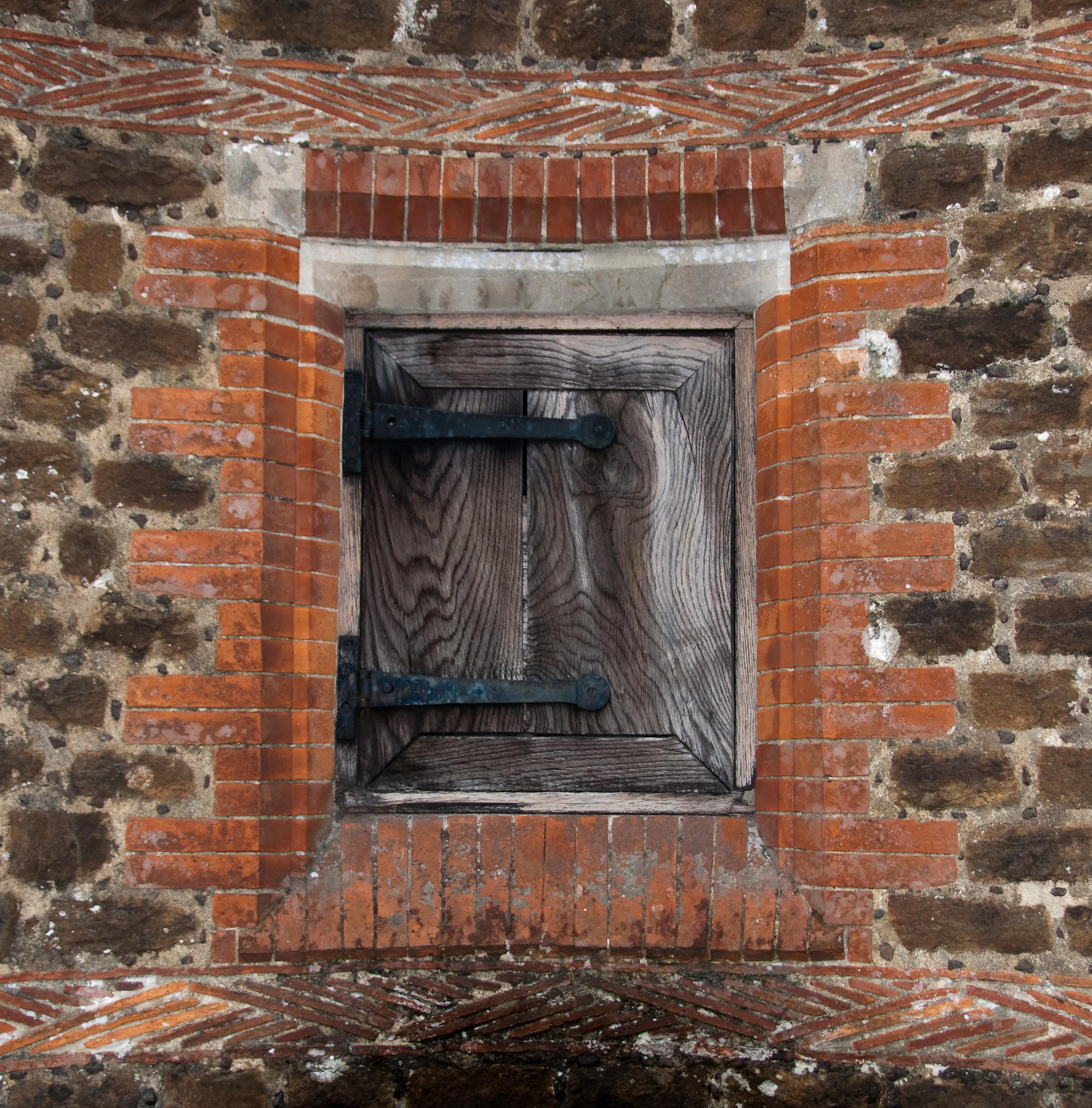
Window in one of the curved walls of the north wing, showing the horizontal bands of tiles laid in a herringbone pattern and the galleted Bargate stone blockwork

The main U-shaped frontage faces west and is immediately adjacent to the Petworth Road. The porch is classical in style with Doric columns and is flanked by single-storey concave walls that form the inner faces of the forward-projecting north and south wings. Above the entrance, the main elevation is formed of three gables with narrow windows. All of the west-facing windows have brick mullions and those on the first floor have brick pediments The west end of each wing is crowned by a pair of tall, brick chimneys and the curves of the frontage are accentuated by bands of tiles in the walls. O'Brien, Nairn and Cherry write: "…although the front is completely symmetrical, it never seems so because the eye is led away completely by the play of chimneys and screen walls."

The ground floor was conceived as a circular layout with the main staircase at its centre. The south wing is occupied by the drawing room, which has a small gallery and a large inglenook fireplace. The dining room, on the eastern side, is adjacent to a loggia, which is linked to the studio on the north side of the house by a timber-covered walkway. (Note: Lutyens used a similar arrangement for the dining room and loggia at Orchards, the house near Godalming that he built for William and Julia Chance.) The north wing contains the kitchen, which Lawrence Weaver notes is inconveniently sited for the dining room on the other side of the ground floor. There are seven bedrooms on the first floor, with more in the attic.

== Garden ==
The main architectural feature of the garden is the Grade II-listed pergola, which links the terrace to the croquet lawn. The structure consists of alternating circular and square brick columns, supporting a lattice of wooden timbers. Partially screened by a Cypress hedge, it is planted with vines and roses. The pergola inspired later Lutyens/Jekyll collaborations, including at Deanery Garden and Hestercombe. Beneath the canopy is a circular dipping well.

The planting scheme for the garden was conceived by Gertrude Jekyll. The terrace runs alongside the southwestern side of the building and includes some yew topiary, which may not have been part of her original design.

== Critical responses ==
Ian Nairn comments: "Tigbourne leaves the visitor uncertain whether simply to be profoundly thankful for what is there, or to regret that Lutyens never afterwards came up to this level." Clive Aslet writes: "The confident geometry of Tigbourne Court… makes it look bigger than it actually is. In fact, it is an example of a new, smaller type of country house, built with a garden but no landed estate, and within easy distance of London."

Architect, Stephen Gardiner writes: "...amazing ingredients of Elizabethan gables, Roman Tiles, Tudor bricks and chimneys, Doric columns, classical geometry and leaded glass are mixed together with tremendous vigour to make a work of dignity and composure." Journalist, Michael McNay writes: "Looking at one of the best of [Lutyens'] houses, Tigbourne Court, is like looking at a drawing by Osbert Lancaster made manifest in bricks and mortar... This is the sort of building... that has led to a rebirth of Lutyens' reputation among the young."

== Tigbourne Cottage and Little Leat ==
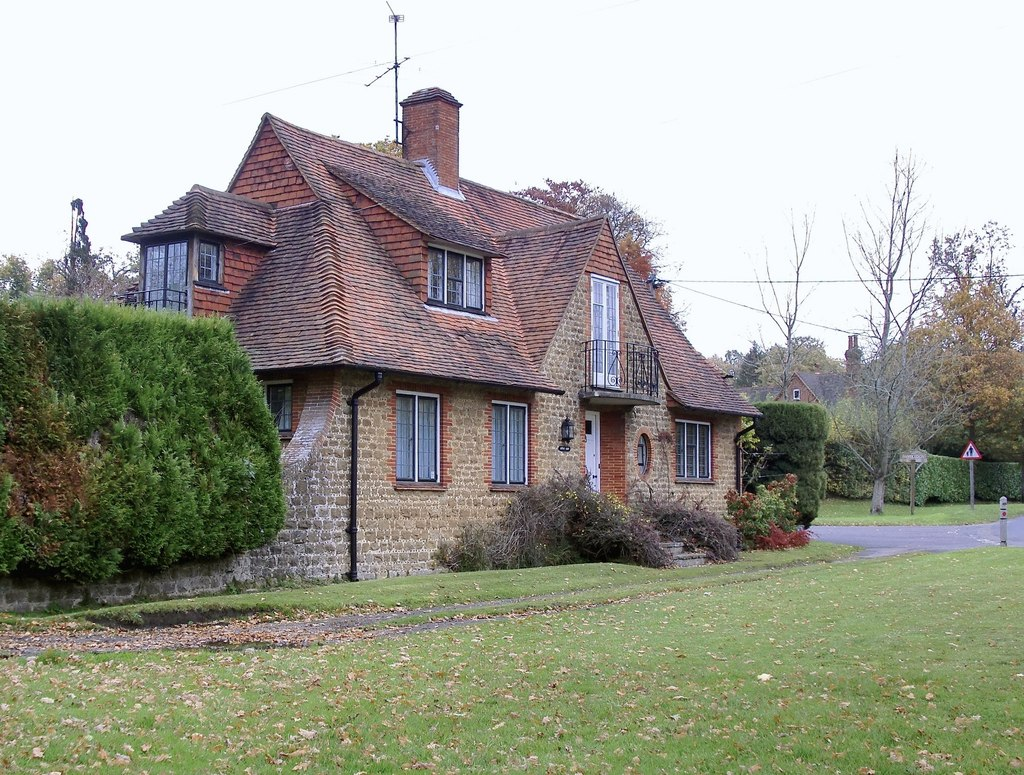
Little Leat

Tigbourne Cottage and Little Leat were designed by Lutyens and constructed at the main time as the main house. Both are built of galleted Bargate stone with plain tiled roofs and are now Grade II listed. Tigbourne Cottage was originally the coachman's residence. Little Leat, the former coach house and stables, was converted to a three-bedroom cottage in 1958.

== Bibliography ==
- Amery, Colin (1981). "The Practice Grows". Lutyens: The Work of the English Architect Sir Edwin Lutyens (1869–1944). London: Arts Council of Great Britain. ISBN 0-7287-0304-1.
- Aslet, Clive (2011). The Arts & Crafts county house. London: Aurum Press. ISBN 978-1-84-513680-2.
- Brown, Jane (1982). Gardens of a Golden Afternoon. The Story of a Partnership: Edwin Lutyens and Gertrude Jekyll. London: Allen Lane. ISBN 0-7139-1440-8.
- Coveney, Henry (2015). Maggie Smith : A biography. London: Weidenfeld and Nicolson. ISBN 978-1-47-460023-1.
- Dunster, David, ed. (1986). Edwin Lutyens. London: Architectural Monographs and Academy Editions. ISBN 978-0-84-780235-7.
- Gover, J.E.B; Mawer, A.; Stenton, F.M. (1969). The place-names of Surrey. Cambridge: Cambridge University Press.
- Gradidge, Roderick (1981). Edwin Lutyens: Architect Laureate. London: George Allen and Unwin. ISBN 0-04-720023-5.
- Hussey, Christopher (1984). The life of Sir Edwin Lutyens. Melton: ACC Art Books. ISBN 978-0-90-746259-0.
- Macrory, Henry (2018). Ultimate folly. London: Biteback Publishing Ltd. ISBN 978-1-78-590378-6.
- Nairn, Ian; Pevsner, Nikolaus; Cherry, Bridget (2002) [1962]. Surrey. The Buildings of England. New Haven: Yale University Press. ISBN 0-300-09675-5.
- O'Brien, Charles; Nairn, Ian; Cherry, Bridget (2022) [1962]. Surrey. The Buildings of England. London: Yale University Press. ISBN 978-0-30-023478-7.
- Richardson, Margaret (1981). "List of Works by Sir Edwin Lutyens". Lutyens: The Work of the English Architect Sir Edwin Lutyens (1869–1944). London: Arts Council of Great Britain. ISBN 0-7287-0304-1.
- Richardson, Tim (2005). English gardens in the twentieth century. London: Aurum Press. ISBN 1-84513071-5.
- Ridley, Jane (2002). The Architect and his Wife: A Life of Edwin Lutyens. London: Chatto & Windus. ISBN 0-7011-7201-0.
- Tankard, Judith B. (2011). Gertrude Jekyll and the country house garden. London: Aurum Press. ISBN 978-1-84-513624-6.
- Weaver, Lawrence (1987) [1913]. Houses and gardens by E.L. Lutyens. Woodbridge: Antique Collectors' Club. ISBN 978-0-90-202898-2.
