= Botanischer Garten Münster =

Botanical garden in Germany

Coordinates: 51°57′49.32″N 7°36′38″E

- Interactive map of Botanischer Garten Münster
- Type: Botanical garden
- Location: 3 Schloßgarten, Münster, North Rhine-Westphalia, Germany
- Area: 4.6 hectares (11 acres)
- Founder: Freiherr vom Stein
- Operator: University of Münster (Westfälische Wilhelms-Universität Münster)
- Open: Daily, free admission

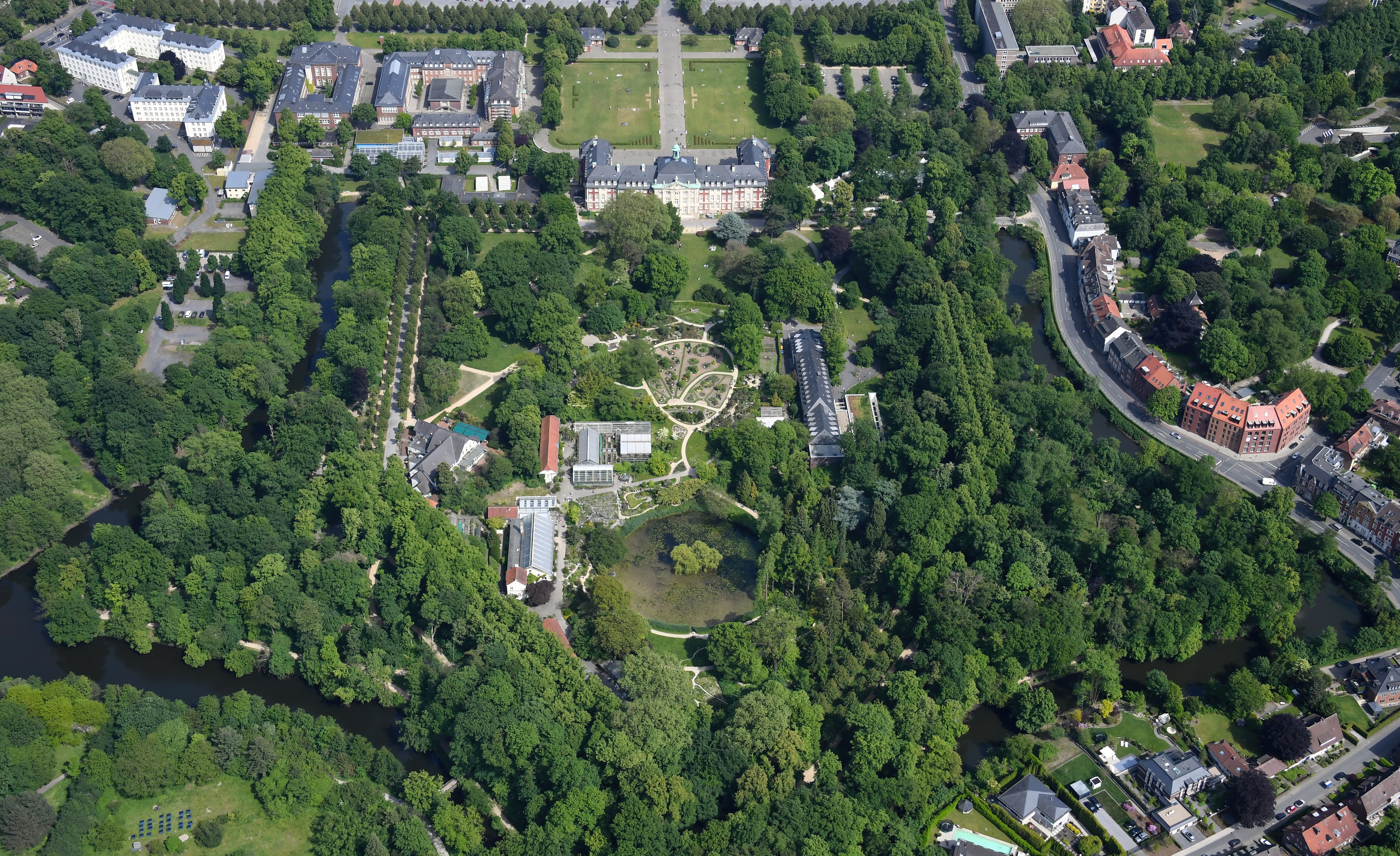
Aerial view of the Botanischer Garten Münster

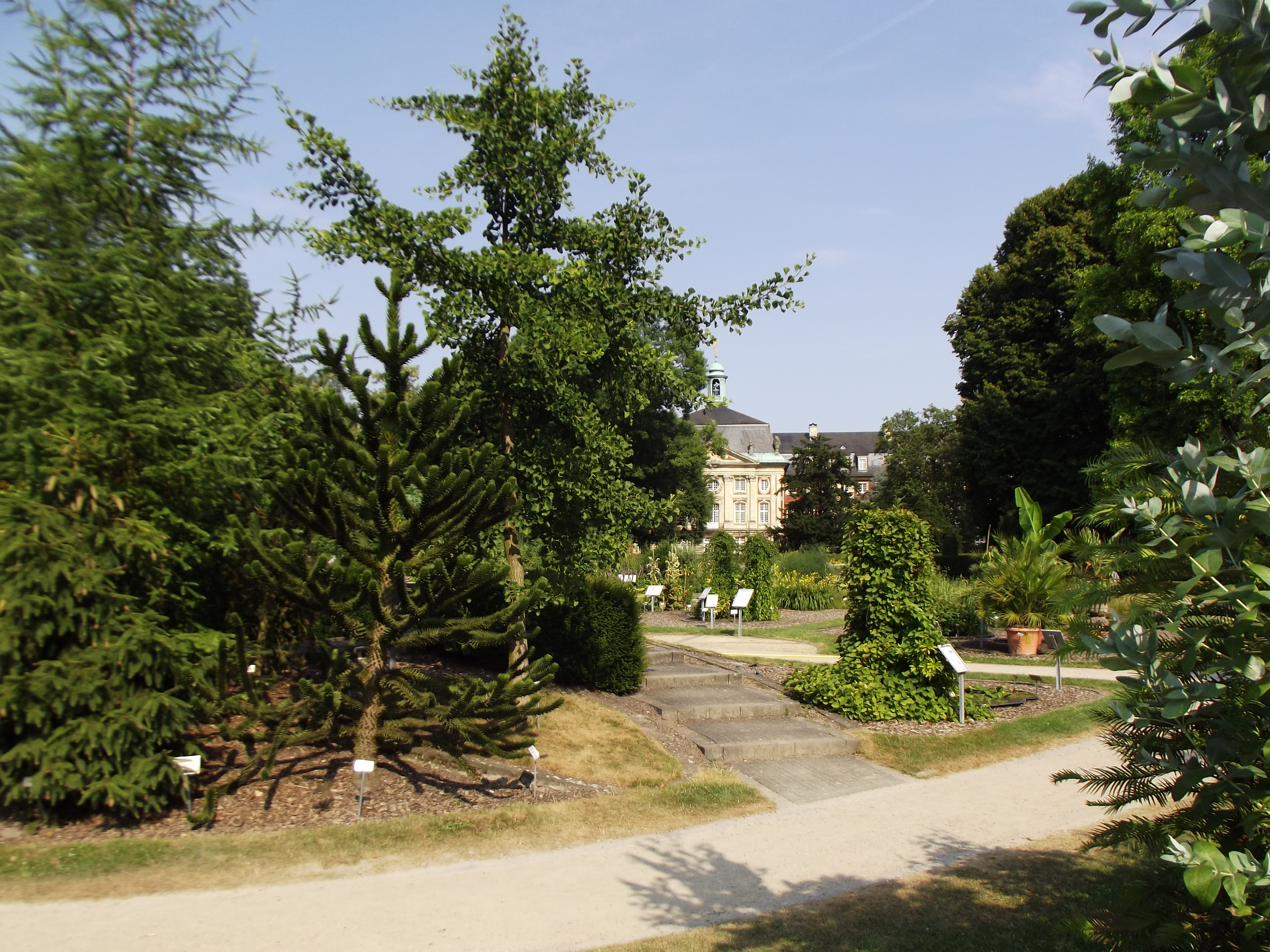
View onto the castle

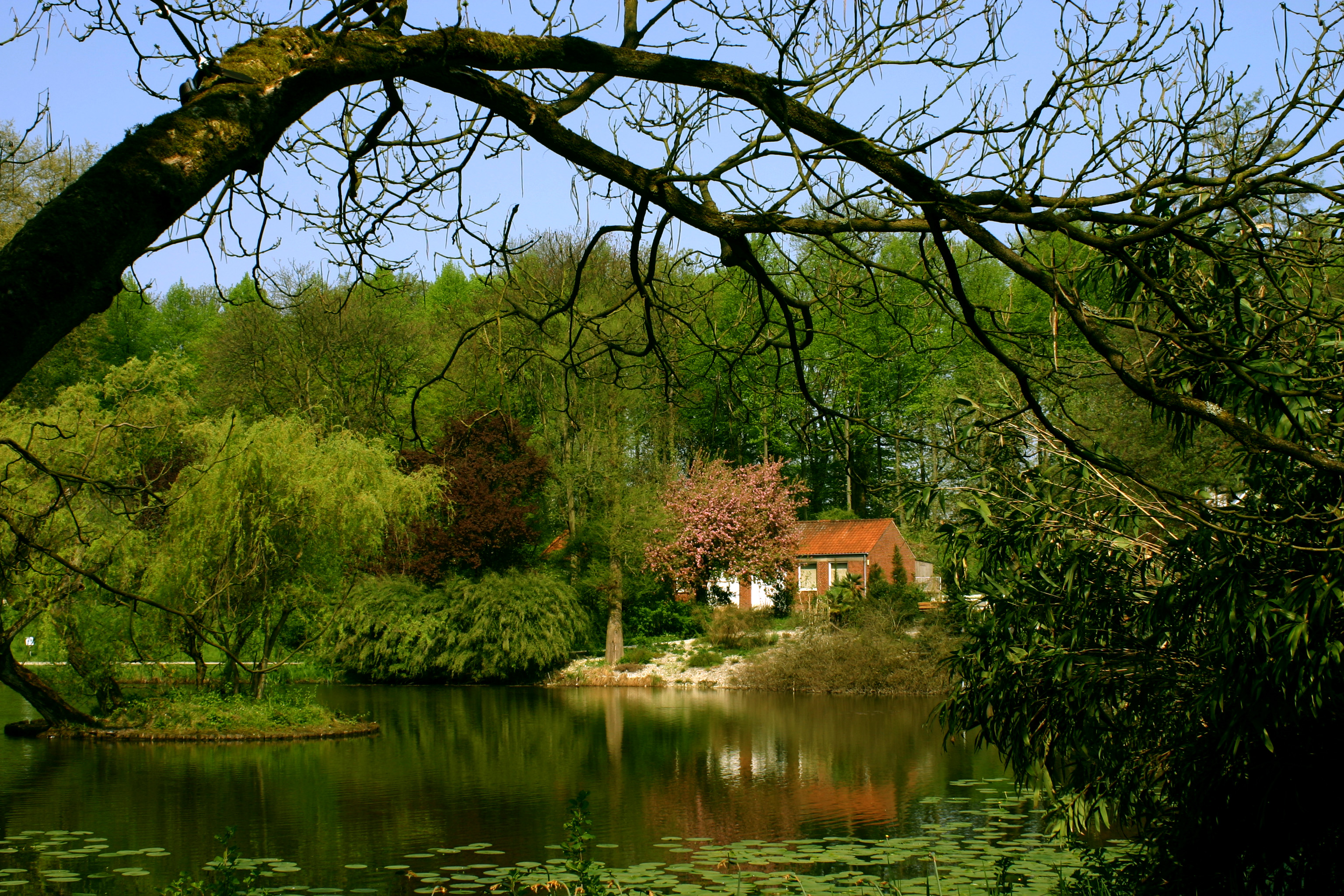
Lake within the garden area

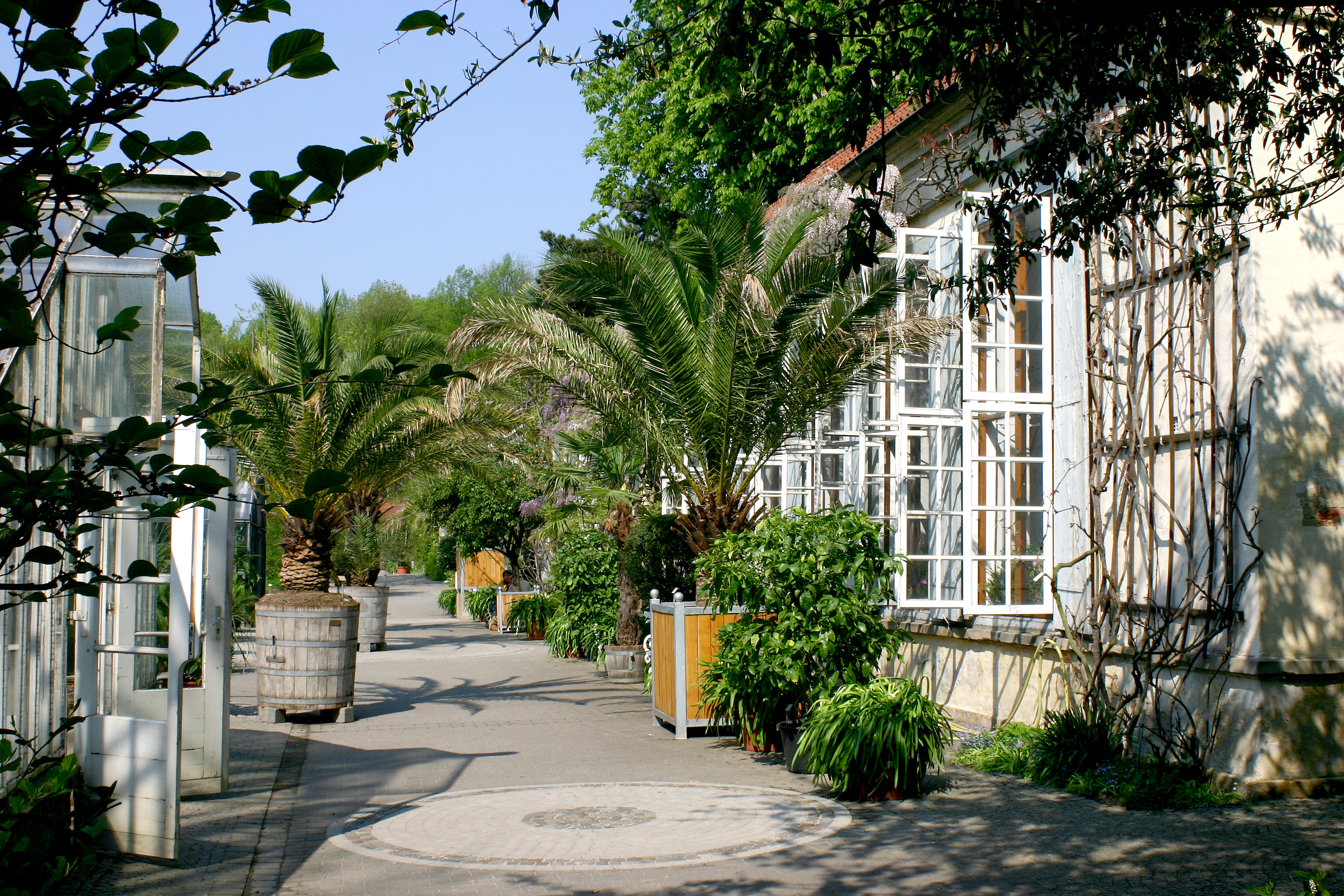
Orangery

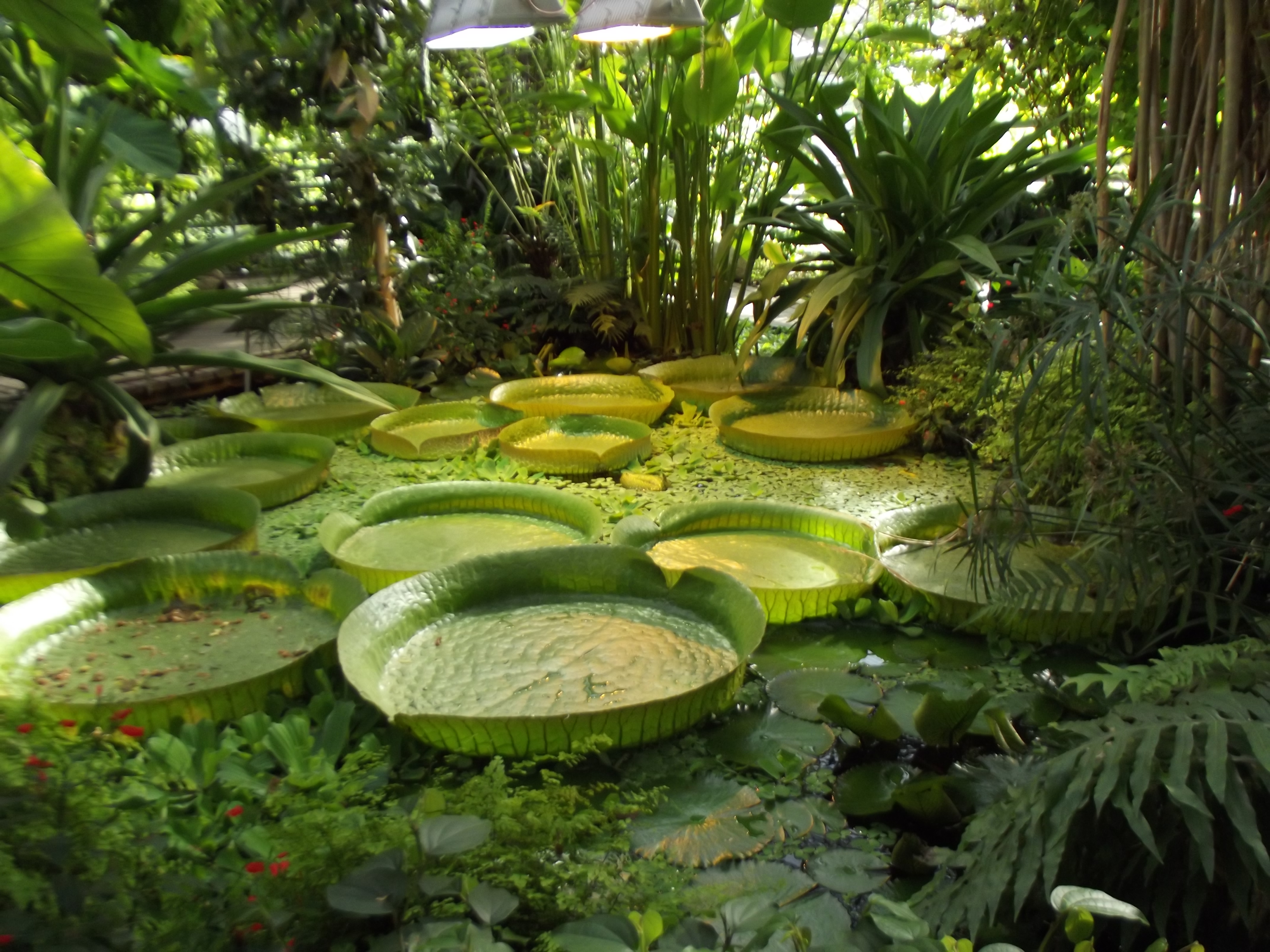
Victoria Regia, Viktoriahaus

The Botanischer Garten Münster (4.6 hectares) is a botanical garden maintained by the University of Münster (Westfälische Wilhelms-Universität Münster).

== Location ==
It is located directly behind the Prince Bishop's Castle, within the castle grounds at 3 Schloßgarten, Münster, North Rhine-Westphalia, Germany, and open daily free of charge.

== History ==
The garden was begun in 1803 by Freiherr vom Stein for the university's medical faculty, with first greenhouses built in 1804. From 1806–1815, during the occupation of Westphalia by French troops and the Congress of Vienna, its emphasis changed from medicinal plants to a primary focus on indigenous plants. Its first seed catalog issued in 1827, and its orangery was constructed in 1840. Noted botanist Carl Correns (1864–1933) directed the garden from 1909–1915, with the first tropical greenhouse built in 1935. The garden was severely damaged during World War II, with all its greenhouses destroyed. Even so in 1952 the garden was partially restored and five greenhouses had been rebuilt. An artificial stream, meadow, and moor were created during the 1990s, and in 2005 a new medicinal garden added.

== Plants in display ==
Today the garden contains about 8,000 species, including a major collection of 230 of the 280 known Pelargonium species. In addition to ten greenhouses (total area about 2,000 m²), major garden sections are as follows:

- Alpine garden with plants from the Alps and Pyrenees
- Arboretum, as well as birch-oak forest and Tilia-beech trees
- Australia and New Zealand plants
- Cottage garden from the 1900s, featuring vegetables and herbs
- Mediterranean plants, kept in the orangery in cold months
- Moor and heath
- Systematic garden of seed plants
- Tropical house
- Victoria House, containing Victoria regia

The garden contains a good selection of rare and mature tree specimens in its arboretum, including orange trees that are over 200 years old.

== See also ==
- European Garden Heritage Network
- List of botanical gardens in Germany
