= Galleting =

Architectural technique

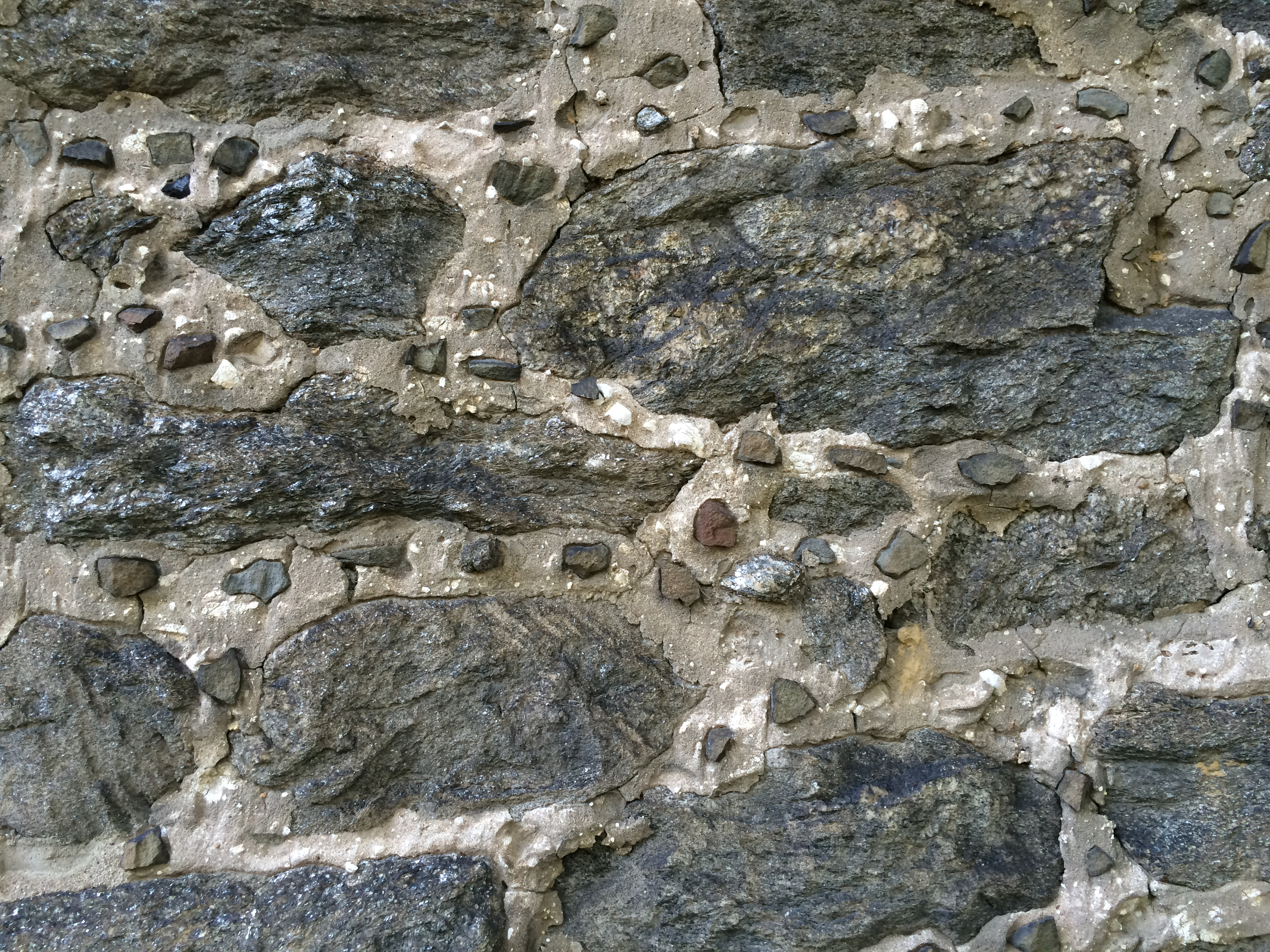
This detail from St. James Episcopal Church in Philadelphia, PA (U.S.) shows a typical use of galleting.

Galleting, sometimes known as garreting or garneting, is an architectural technique in which spalls (small pieces of stone) are pushed into wet mortar joints during the construction of a masonry building. The term comes from the French word galet, which means "pebble." In general, the word "galleting" refers to the practice while the word "gallet" refers to the spall. Galleting was mostly used in England, where it was common in South East England and the county of Norfolk.

== Description ==
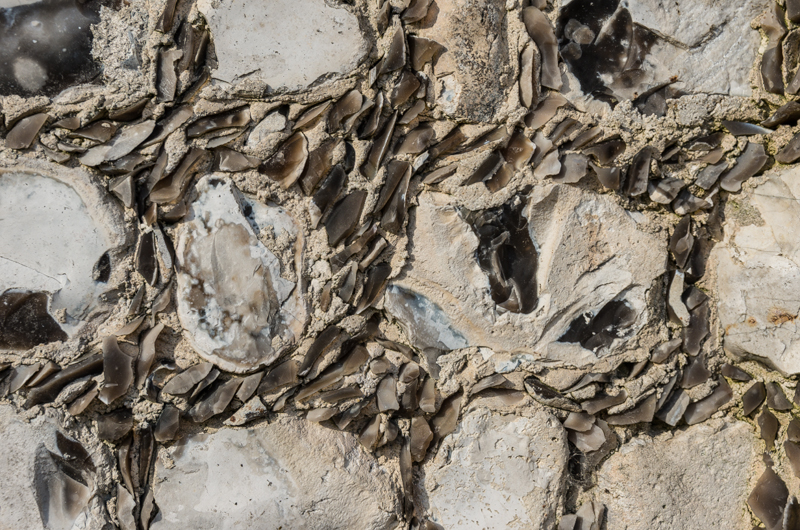
The main building of West Dean College in Sussex, England is an example of using flint galleting in flint walls.

Galleting is mainly used in stone masonry buildings constructed out of sandstone or flint. The technique varies depending on which of these materials is used. In sandstone buildings, the spalls are often a different type of sandstone than the one used in the wall, though sometimes they are pieces of the same stone. For example, carstone, also known as ironstone, is a type of sandstone that is commonly used for galleting. In sandstone buildings, the spalls are usually shaped into small cubes about half an inch in diameter and are flush with the stone. In flint buildings, the edges of thin slivers of flint are commonly pushed into the mortar, so that the surface of the wall is uneven and the edges of the flint spalls jut out from the wall. In some cases, these techniques are combined such that flint walls are galleted with sandstone spalls or vice versa, however it is uncommon. Although it is also uncommon, galleting has been used in brick masonry construction, where sandstone spalls are generally used over flint ones. More eclectic materials used as gallets include brick, tile, beach pebbles, glass, and oyster shells. In higher status buildings, galleting was superseded by square knapping the flints to produce flat, squared stones that produced a surface with little exposed mortar.

It is unclear whether galleting performs a practical, structural function or is an aesthetic application. It is possible that galleting is used when the local stone is not an easily worked freestone, which means that the stone is more irregular and therefore requires thick mortar joints. In this case, gallets would serve as wedges to provide structural support to the stone and would shield the mortar from weather. It is also possible that galleting does not reinforce the mortar and was used purely for aesthetic reasons. Scholarship has also suggested that galleting was neither a structural nor an aesthetic practice, but rather a superstitious one in an attempt to protect a building from witches and other evil influences. However, Historic Scotland Technical Advice Note 1, regarding use of lime mortars, 1995, CLEARLY states "...numerous small pinning stones which contributed to the overall stability of the masonry, reduced the quantity of expensive lime required and minimised the effects of drying shrinkage in the mortar".

== Location ==
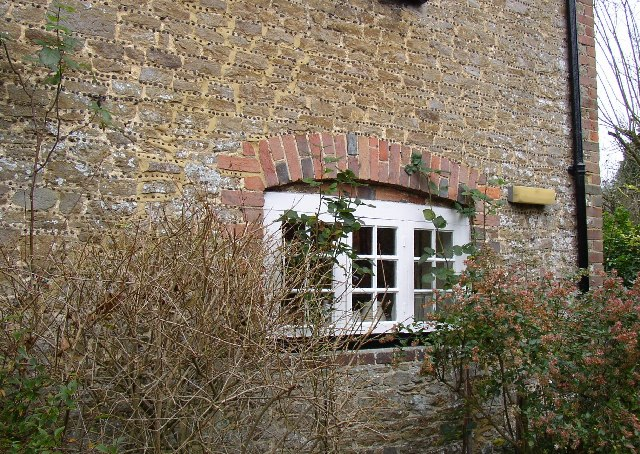
A house in Puttenham, Surrey, England prominently displays galleting.

In England, galleting can be found almost exclusively in the South East between the North and South Downs, where sandstone is common, and in the county of Norfolk, where flint is common. Given that these locations are not contiguous, much has been debated about the origin and spread of the practice, with some attributing its geographical prevalence to the particularities of the stonemason trade.

Most scholarship focuses on the use of galleting in England. However, there is evidence that it was used in rural Pennsylvania and Maryland as well as in Philadelphia, Vienna, Austria, the Azores, Paris, and Barcelona.

== Period of use ==
There is some debate about when galleting was most commonly practised. Some sources associate the technique with late medieval building construction, while others suggest that galleting was used mostly in the 17th and 18th centuries before declining in popularity over the course of the 19th century. Historical records indicate that parts of Windsor Castle (n.d.), Eton College (c. 1441), and the Tower of London (c. 1514) were galleted with flint or oyster shells. This suggests that galleting may have been first used in more prestigious buildings and was later adopted in less prestigious buildings once timber framing was supplanted by masonry construction.

== Examples ==
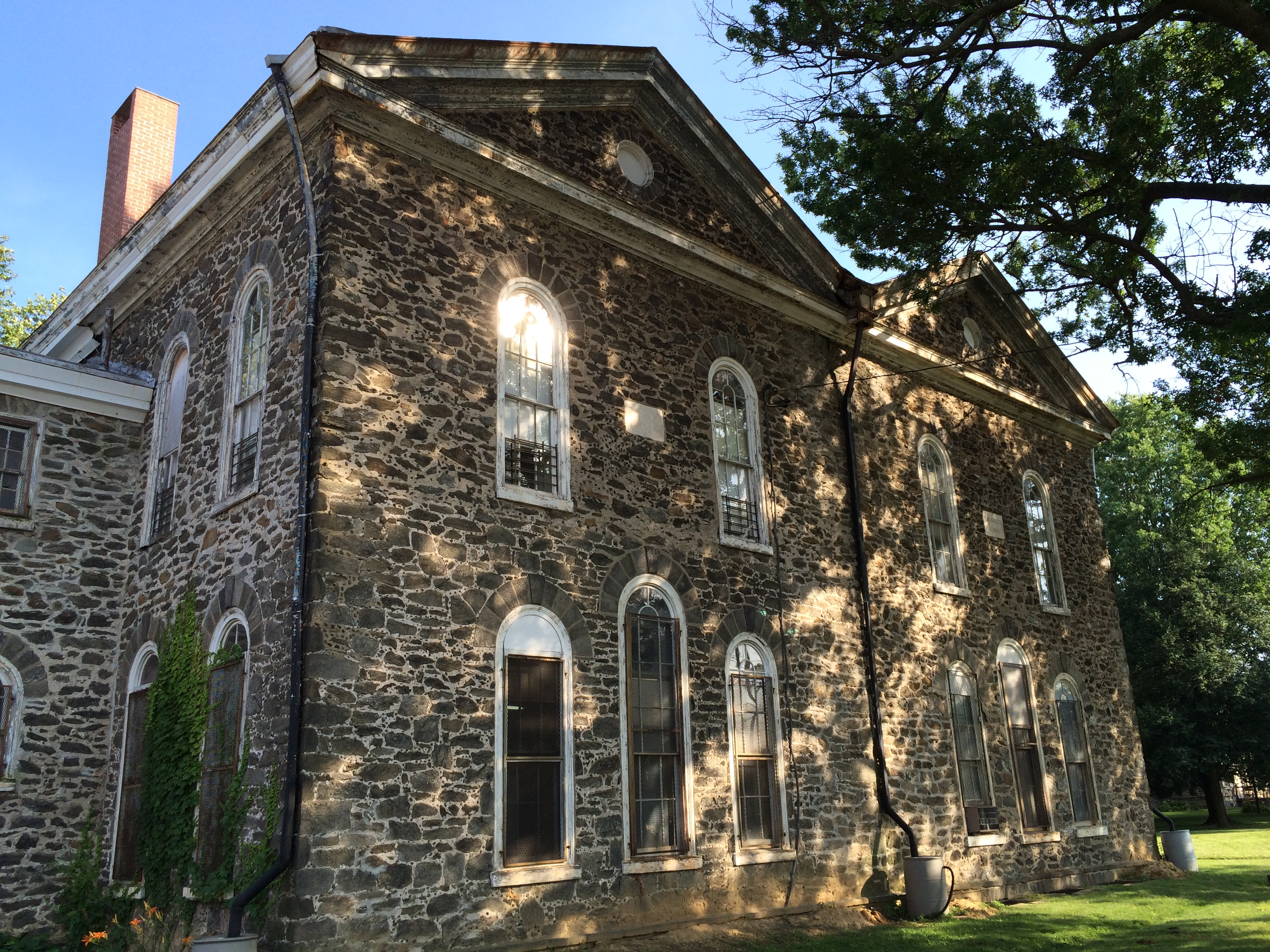
St James' Episcopal Church in the Kingsessing neighborhood of Philadelphia, Pennsylvania (U.S.) is a rare example of galleting outside of England.

- Sevenoaks School
- Knole House
- Ightham Mote
- Tigbourne Court
- Norwich Guildhall
- Strangers' Hall in Norwich
- The village of Heacham in Norfolk boasts examples of a wide variety of types of galleting.
- Church of St. Michael and All Angels, Halton, Buckinghamshire
- St James' Episcopal Church, Philadelphia, PA (U.S.)
- Hancock's Resolution, Anne Arundel County, MD (U.S.)
- The greenhouse at Bartram's Garden, Philadelphia, PA (U.S.)
- Bradford Friends Meeting House, West Bradford Township, Chester County, PA (U.S.)
- Sully Stone Dairy, Sully Historic Site, Chantilly, Virginia (U.S.)
