= Parc Oriental de Maulévrier =

Garden in France

Coordinates: 47.0037°N 0.7502°W

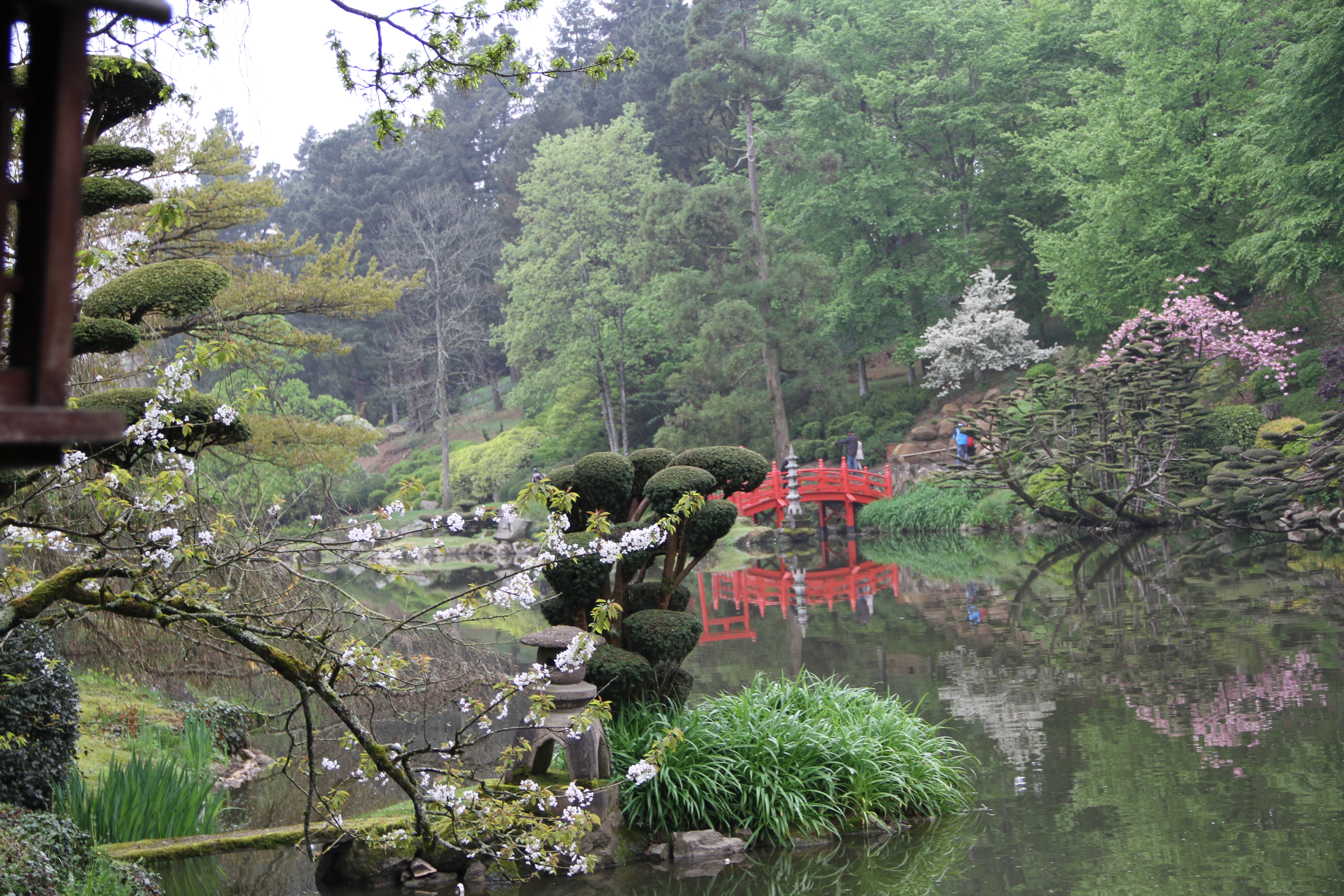
Parc Oriental de Maulévrier

The Parc Oriental de Maulévrier (29 hectares) is a Japanese garden located in Maulévrier, Maine-et-Loire, Pays de la Loire, France. It is open daily except Monday in the warmer months; an admission fee is charged.

== History ==
The park was created between 1899-1913 on the grounds of Château Colbert by noted Parisian architect Alexandre Marcel (1860-1928), designer of the Cambodia pavilion at the Exposition Universelle (1900), for the château's industrialist owner. Indeed, the park's Khmer elements are reproduced from molds from the exhibition. Having married the owner's daughter, Marcel often dwelt in the château as he oversaw its landscaping. After his death, she remained in residence until her own death in 1945, after which time the park fell into desolation for 40 years.

In 1976 the château's property was cut in three, with the municipality purchasing the park's segment in 1980. Restoration began in 1987, based upon photographs and memories, and by 2004 the garden was named a "Jardin Remarquable" by the ministry of culture.

== Today ==
Today the park is the largest Japanese garden in Europe. It contains about 300 plant species, with water features, a bridge, and a pagoda, as well as azaleas, camellias, rhododendrons, and Japanese maples. There is also a permanent exhibition of bonsai and ceramics.

== See also ==
- List of botanical gardens in France
- European Garden Heritage Network
