= European Garden Heritage Network =

Nonprofit organization

The European Garden Heritage Network is a nonprofit organization established in 2003 within the EU-Programme INTERREG IIIB NWE to foster transnational co-operation in regional development and cultural heritage. It brings together garden experts, government services, foundations, and tourism agencies to preserve, develop, and promote gardens of historic interest within northwestern Europe.

== Gardens ==
- Ada Hofman
- Adenauer-Garten
- Anholt, Wasserburg
- Arley Hall
- Bad Driburg, Kurpark
- Bad Oeynhausen, Kurpark
- Begijnhof, Brugge
- Benrath, Schloss
- Biddulph Grange
- Birkenhead Park
- Bishop's Palace, Wells
- Blenheim Gardens
- Bochum, Stadtpark
- Böckel, Gutspark
- Bodnant Garden
- Bretons, Auberge de la Fontaine aux
- Bridgemere Garden World
- Brühl, Schlosspark
- Buckland Abbey
- Bulskampveld
- Cholmondeley Castle
- Claremont Landscape Garden
- Karlsaue, Kassel
- Dalheim, Kloster
- d'Aertrycke, Kasteelpark
- Detmold, Palaisgarten
- Drachenburg, Park
- Duisburg, Garten der Erinnerung
- Duisburg Nord Landschaftspark
- Dunham Massey
- Dyck, Schloss
- East Lambrook Manor
- Emscherbruch, Landschaftspark
- Esters / Lange, Haus
- Flora-Park und Botanischer Garten
- Forde Abbey
- Gaasbeek
- Gatton Park
- Gawsworth Hall
- Gelsenkirchen, Nordsternpark
- Greenway
- Grugapark Essen
- Gütersloh, Stadtpark
- Hatchlands Park
- Hawkstone Park
- Heerenhof
- Hepworth Sculpture Garden
- Hespérides, Jardins des
- Hestercombe Gardens
- Het Loo
- Hohenhof
- Hohenlimburg
- Hombroich, Insel
- Hovestadt, Schloss
- Huys de Dohm
- Iford Manor
- Kamp, Terrassengarten Kloster
- Kerkrade Botanical Garden
- Kiftsgate
- Kijktuinen Nunspeet
- Klever Gartenland
- Kreislehrgarten Steinfurt
- La Roche Jagu
- Liebermann-Villa, Garten
- Linköping Trädgårdsföreningen
- Loseley Park
- Loppem, Kasteelpark
- Lousberg, Waldpark
- Lude, Château du
- Lütetsburg, Schlosspark
- Lyme Park
- Mapperton
- Maulévrier, Parc Oriental de
- Minack
- Montacute
- Münster, Botanischer Garten
- Ness Botanic Gardens
- Neuhaus, Schloss- und Auenpark
- Neuland, Park
- Nordkirchen, Schlosspark
- Norton Priory
- Oelde, Vier-Jahreszeiten-Park
- Painshill Park
- Polesden Lacey
- Port Sunlight, Gartenstadt
- Potager Extraordinaire, Le
- Raesfeld, Tiergarten
- Ramster
- Rheda, Schlossgarten
- Rheder, Landschaftspark
- Rheine, Salinenpark
- Rhulenhof
- Ripshorst, Haus
- Rombergpark
- Rubensgarten
- Rüschhaus/Hülshoff
- Salzuflen, Kurpark
- Savill Garden
- Steinfurter Bagno
- Tatton Park
- Titsey Estate
- Trentham Estate
- Vestingen, Brugge
- Vivary Park
- Vonderort, Revierpark
- Welbergen, Haus
- Wellington Park
- Wendlinghausen, Schloss
- Westonbirt Arboretum
- Winkworth Arboretum
- Wijlre, Kasteeltuin
- Wisley RHS Garden
