= Hestercombe Gardens =

Garden complex situated in Somerset, England

Coordinates: 51°3′9″N 3°5′1″W

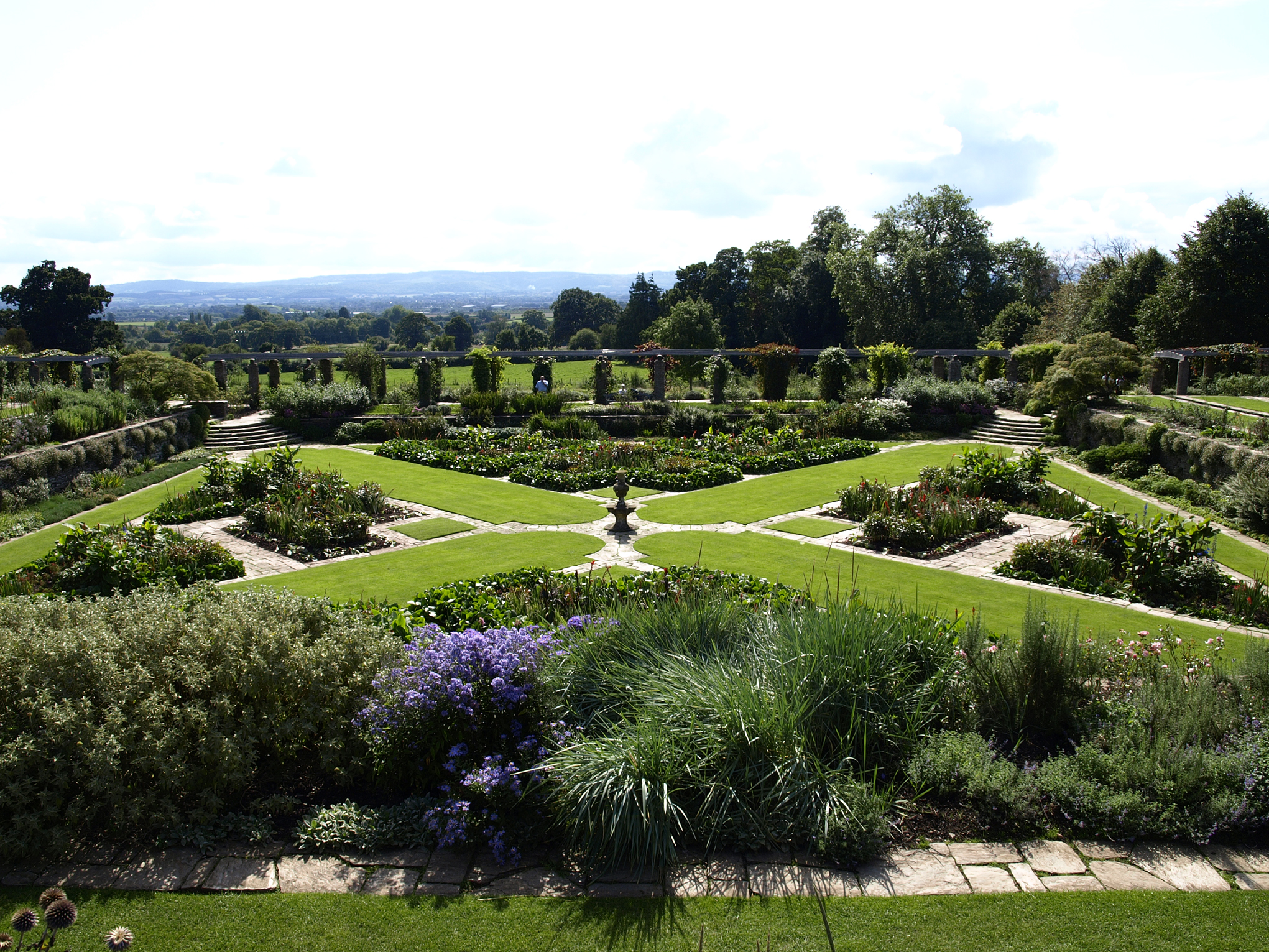
Hestercombe Gardens: View from the South Terrace; The Great Plat, the Great Pergola and the Taunton Valley in the background

Hestercombe Gardens is a garden complex situated on the grounds of Hestercombe House in the southwestern English county of Somerset. The entire garden complex comprises three individual gardens from different stylistic periods. Notably, the Edwardian Garden from the early 20th century holds national significance as the first collaborative effort between gardener and artist Gertrude Jekyll and architect Edwin Lutyens. Today, Hestercombe Gardens stands as one of the most important listed gardens of the 20th century and is under the ownership of the Hestercombe Garden Trust.

== Location ==
Hestercombe Gardens is located close to the English village of Cheddon Fitzpaine, north of the town of Taunton, within the Taunton Deane area of the English county of Somerset. The estate is encompassed by the Quantock Hills. The terrain slopes gently to the south, giving sweeping views of the Taunton Valley and the Blackdown Hills.

== History ==
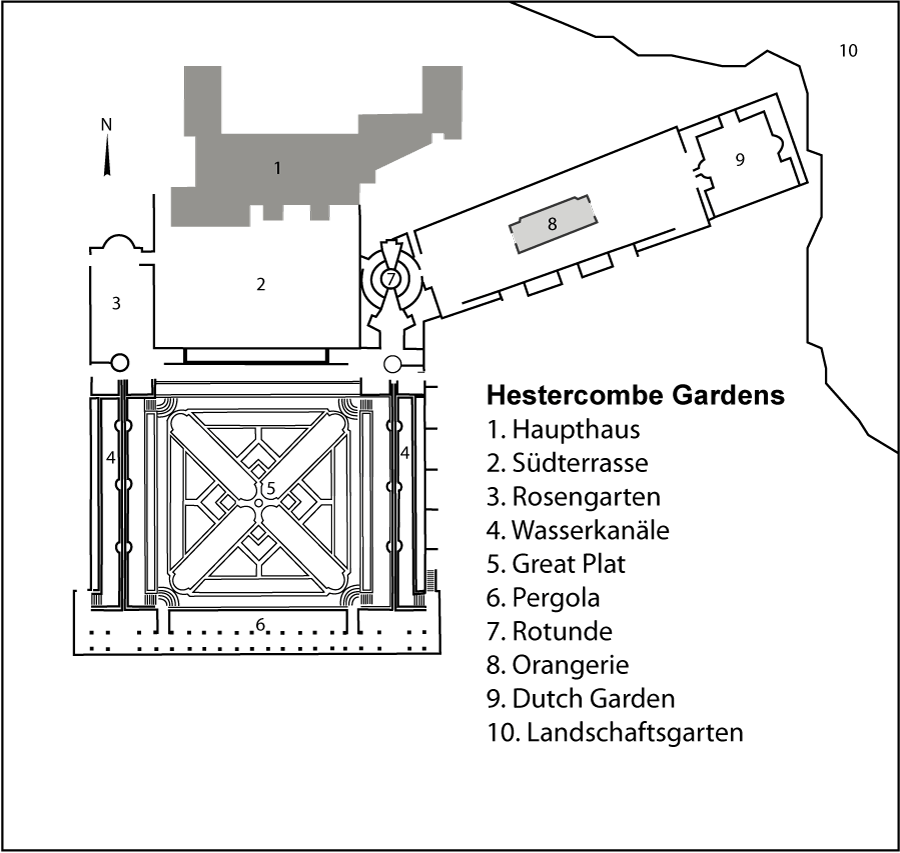
Ground plan of Hestercombe House & Gardens

During the 16th century, the English Warre family, led by Richard Warre, built a country house where Hestercombe Gardens currently stands. Later, Richard's son married Judge John Popham's daughter. Ownership of the estate and its surrounding lands was transferred to Coplestone Warre Bampfylde (1720–1791) in the 18th century, who was a friend of Henry Hoare. The country house was enlarged and a Georgian landscape garden was laid out under Bampflyde's guidance. In 1873, the estate was acquired by Edward Portman, 1st Viscount Portman, who made significant changes to both the house and the garden between 1873 and 1878, resulting in the current Victorian-style appearance of the main building. E.W.B. Portman, the estate's owner and the eldest son of the 2nd Viscount Portman, enlisted Gertrude Jekyll and Edward Lutyens to redesign the garden in front of and beside the house. This project was undertaken between 1904 and 1909.

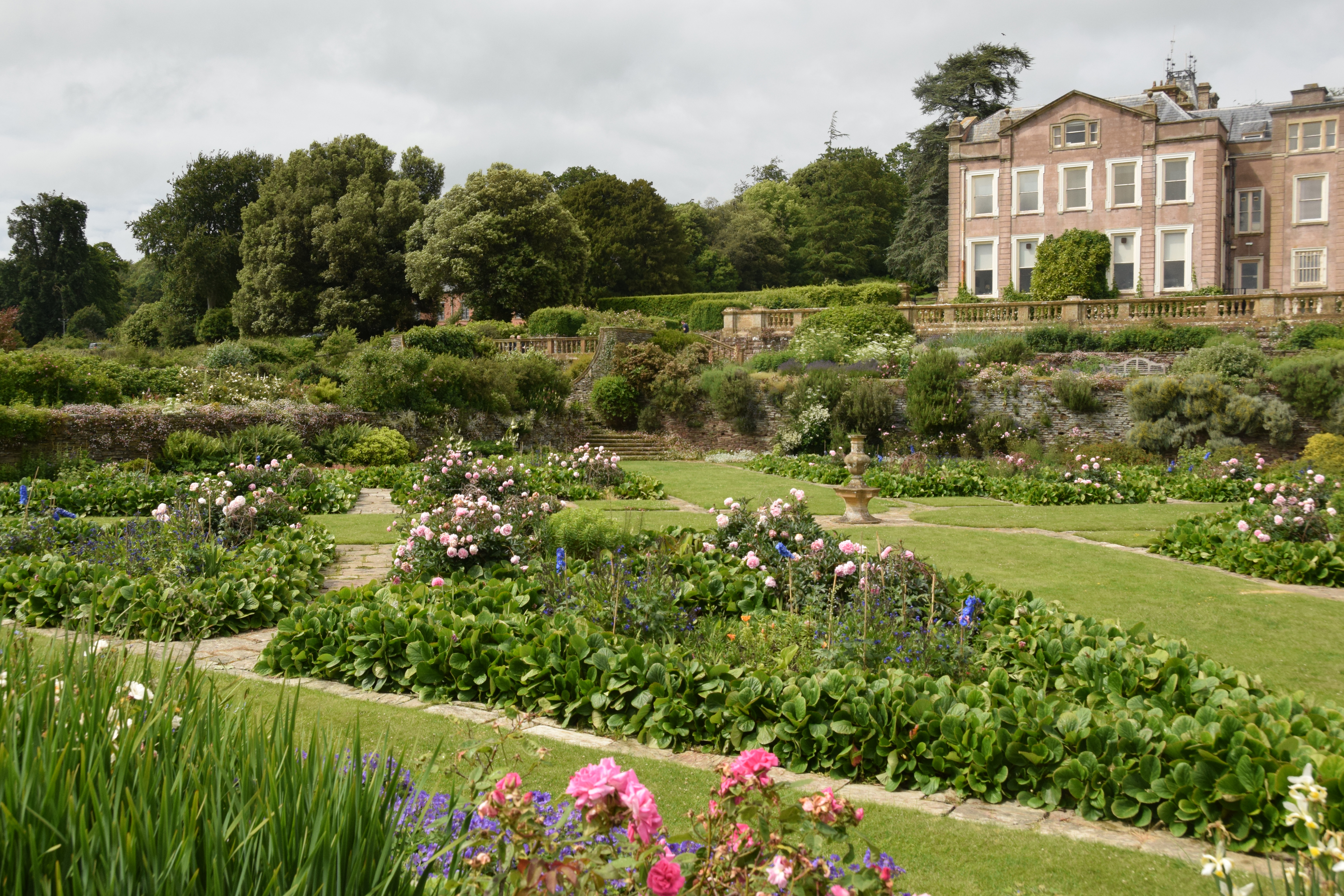
Hestercombe House and Gardens - View from the Pergola

The house and gardens remained under the ownership of the Portman family until 1944. During the Second World War, the British Army utilized the building for various purposes. Part of the 8th Corps headquarters was situated here, responsible for the defense of Somerset, Devon, Cornwall, and Bristol. In preparation for the Normandy invasion, the 398th General Service Engineer Regiment was stationed on the premises, and an American hospital was established following D-Day. In 1951, both the house and the land were acquired by Somerset County Council. The council repurposed the building for administrative functions and, to this day, it serves as the headquarters for the Somerset Fire and Rescue Service. The whole site has since passed into the ownership of the Hestercombe Garden Trust, of which Somerset County Council is now the tenant.

During the 1970s, an extensive restoration project was undertaken to revive the house and gardens' deteriorating state. These restoration efforts were initiated due to their ruinous conditions during that period. While the restoration of the perennial beds initially could not adhere strictly to Jekyll's intricate planting plans, a simplified adaptation was carried out, still capturing Jekyll's distinctive style and approach.

In 1992, the 18th-century landscape garden, which had fallen into obscurity over time, was rediscovered, unearthed, and restored based on original illustrations. As the 21st century began, a portion of the site was designated as a "Biological Site of Special Scientific Interest." This designation was prompted by the presence of a rare bat species, specifically the lesser horseshoe bat (Rhinolophus hipposideros), which resides in the area.

== The Georgian landscape garden ==
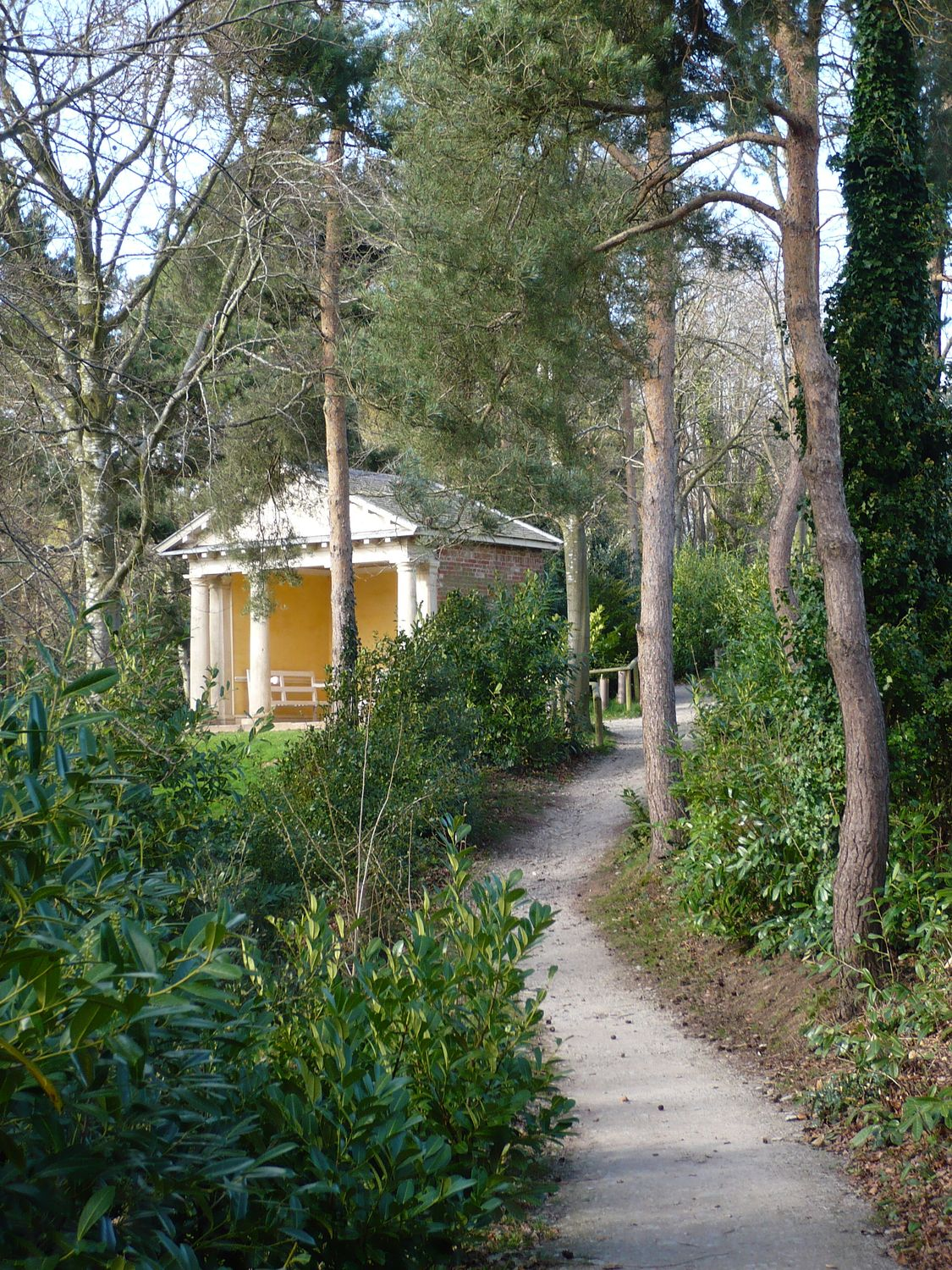
Reconstructed temple in English country garden

The English landscape garden from the second half of the 18th century stands as the earliest garden within Hestercombe Gardens. This garden was crafted between 1750 and 1786 under the stewardship of the estate's then-owner, Coplestone Warre Bampfylde. Covering just over 16 acres, the Georgian landscape park is situated in a valley to the north of the manor house. Bampfylde himself envisioned and designed the landscape garden, drawing inspiration from the contemporary "Arcadian style", which was highly fashionable at the time. In these gardens, the emphasis was less on ornamental plants and more on creating specific atmospheres and viewpoints that harmonized with the surrounding landscape. Trees and shrubs were employed to evoke moods and vistas. The landscape garden included features like a cascade waterfall, seating areas at scenic spots, a small temple, as well as artificial ruins resembling a Greek-style temple and a mausoleum.

The landscape garden fell into disrepair over time and was eventually forgotten by the late 19th century at the latest. It was not until 1992 that the garden was rediscovered and its features brought to light once again. The restoration process, which incurred relatively substantial costs, primarily focused on revitalizing the architectural structures within the garden. Funding from the National Lottery was secured to support these restoration efforts. The watercolors of the landscape garden, preserved by Bampfylde himself, who was also a painter, proved to be invaluable resources for ensuring an authentic restoration.

As an 18th-century landscape garden, however, the site held a rather modest significance. It cannot be equated with landscape gardens of the same era, such as the notable Stourhead located nearby.

== The Victorian Garden ==
The Victorian Garden also referred to as the Victorian terrace or south terrace, is situated in front of the manor house and above the Great Plat. The first Viscount Portman likely commissioned the layout of this garden by architect Henry Hall between 1873 and 1878, during the major alterations to the house. The terrace offers expansive views over the formal garden of the Taunton Valley. The Victorian Garden is bordered by a rose garden to the west and a rotunda to the east.

Lutyens and Jekyll also added the so-called Grey Walk to the south terrace. This is a densely planted herbaceous border that extends the entire length of the building. It features scented perennials in hues of blue, silver, and white, including lavender, rosemary, catnip, and baby's breath.

== The Edwardian formal garden ==
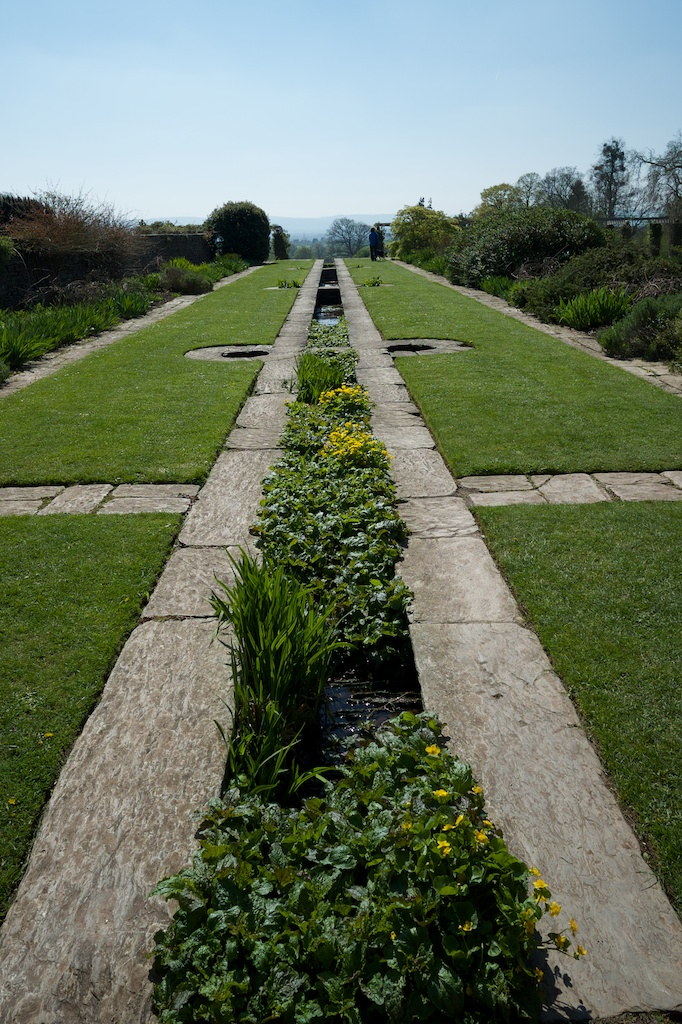
East side terrace, with Hestercombe House and the Rotunda in the background

Edward Lutyens was commissioned in 1903 to design a formal garden for Hestercombe House. His initial task in developing the design concept for the approximately 1.5-acre site was to consider the house itself. During that period, the Victorian architecture of the house was considered unattractive and lacking in elegance The land in front of the house gently sloped to the south, offering an unobstructed view of the Taunton Valley. Lutyens strategically positioned the center of the garden to the south, directly in front of the house's façade. This layout aimed to divert the visitor's attention away from the house and towards the central grounds. Furthermore, the expansive view extended over the East Devon landscape, across Tornton Dean, to the Blackdown Hills. Additional sections of the newly designed formal garden extended diagonally to the east of the house.

Lutyens dedicated a total of five years to the creation of the formal garden. During this time, he held the overall planning role as an architect and was also responsible for planning various architectural aspects, such as the selection of building materials and the design of water features, the orangery, and decorative and practical elements within the garden. Collaborating with him on horticultural aspects, as they had in previous joint projects, was Gertrude Jekyll. She formulated the planting plans for borders and beds and coordinated the selection of plants with the existing structural characteristics of each area.

=== The Great Plat ===
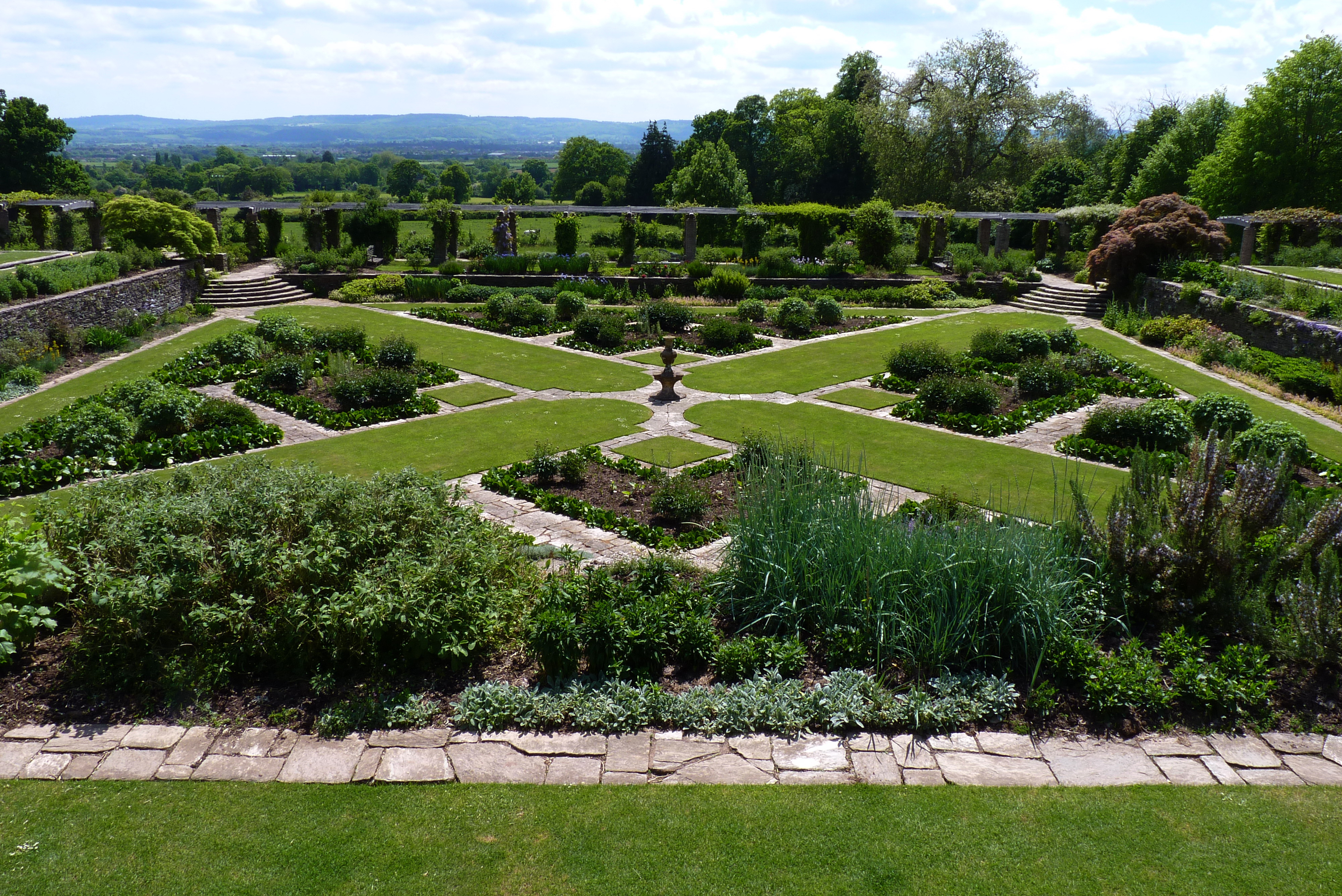
The Great Plat with the large pergola in the background

The centerpiece of the central garden section is the Great Plat, an intricate design of lawns and flowerbeds. In crafting this area, Lutyens drew inspiration from the stylistic elements seen in gardens of the Tudor period and the Italian Renaissance gardens. This particular garden is classified as a sunken garden, characterized by its expansive sunken parterre featuring both lawns and planting and a concluding pergola at the southern end.

The parterre garden is located below the house and is laid out in a square. It is bordered on the north side by a boundary wall made from quarry stones, connecting to the house's elevated level. The original plan did not include a direct pathway connecting the house with this garden area. Instead, a horizontal double border precedes the house, with a central lawn path in between.

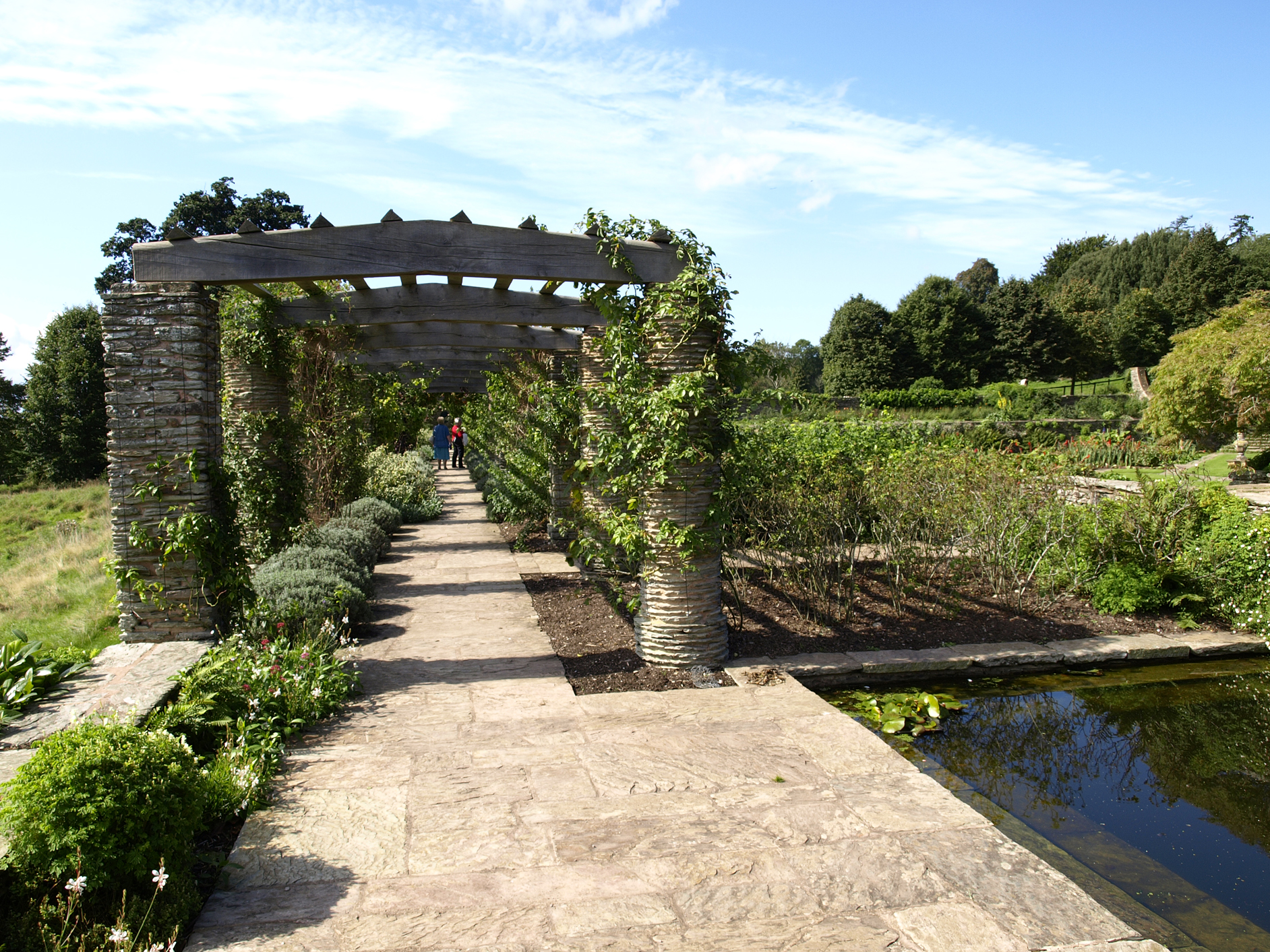
The large pergola - southern end of the formal garden

The relatively large area of the Great Plat was geometrically structured and broken up by Lutyens primarily through a diagonally running wayside cross. This cross is composed of stone bands embedded within the grass and framed with slate, demarcating the four broad lawn pathways. At the end of each pathway, a quarter-circular staircase has been created. Encircling the parterre on three sides are robust walls made from sturdy rubble stone, crafted from fragmented slate slabs, and adorned with plantings.

The Great Plat area is divided into four triangular beds, with natural stone slabs and bands of planted Bergenia cordifolia forming the edges. Lutyens drew inspiration from the principles of "parterre de pièces coupées pour des fleurs" and "parterre à l'angloise." This means that the flower borders are not between gravel but between lawns and paving. Contrary to the principles of Renaissance and Baroque gardens, these borders are adorned with organic plant ribbons. Common elements in the design of the individual beds of Jekyll are the double borders and the planting of the retaining walls.

Lutyens built a low wall with a terminating pergola along the entire 72-meter length of the south side of the Great Plat. This serves both as a closure of the terrace to the south and, at the same time, through its construction, as a transparent link of the garden to the landscape beyond. Furthermore, it also connects the two water basins situated on the terraces adjoining the central parterre. Crafted from locally sourced quarry stones, the pergola boasts a rhythmic arrangement of rounded and angular columns. The pergola is richly adorned with various climbing plants, including climbing roses, clematis, wisteria, honeysuckle, and grapevines.

Planting plans by Jekyll show that she used various vertical accents in the plantings to counteract the depth of the sunken parterre. For instance, she strategically placed tall grass perennials as focal points, visually connecting the Great Plat with the three elevated sides of the garden.

=== Side terraces ===
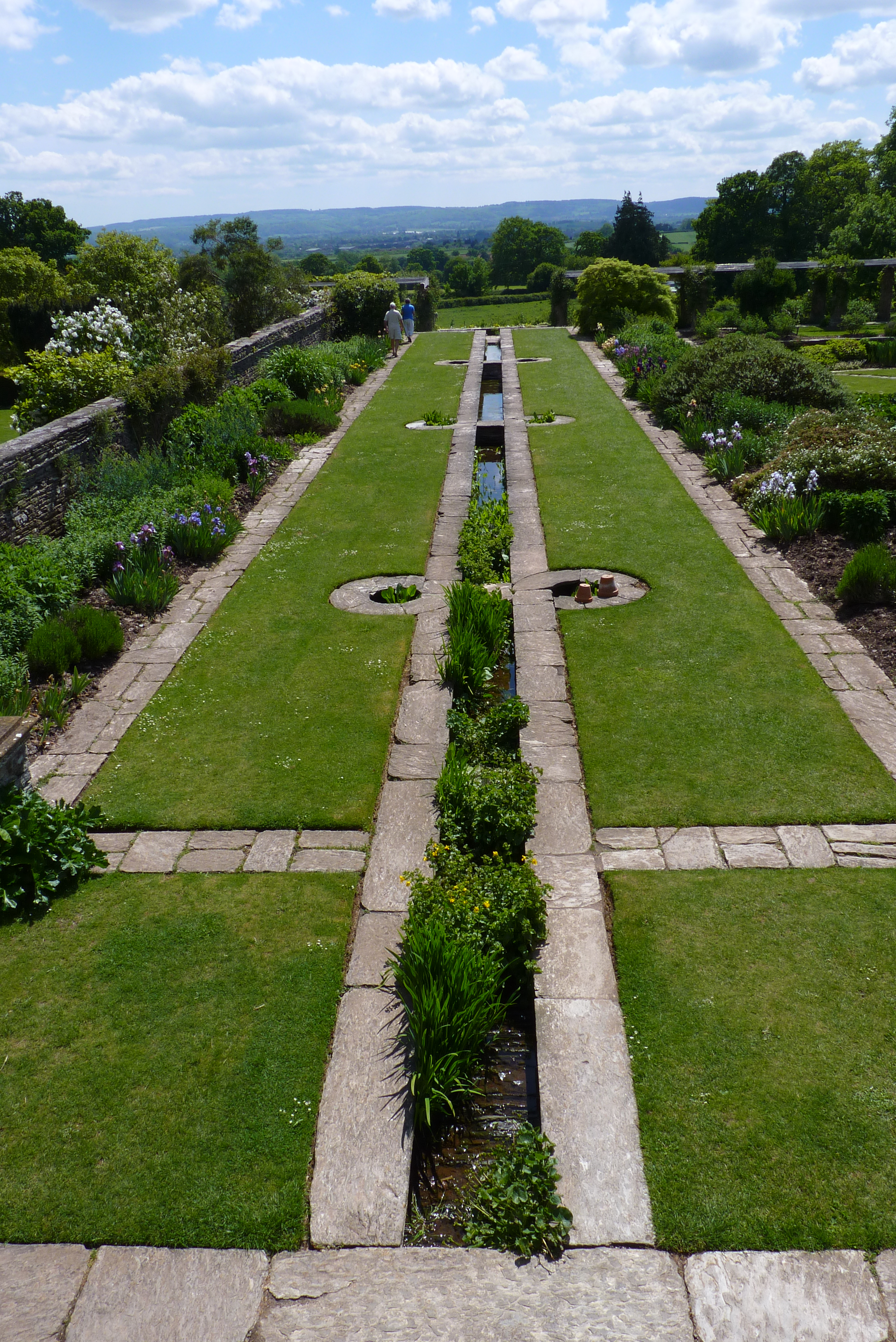
water channel

To each side of the Great Plat are two higher garden terraces. They frame the central garden area from both sides and connect the building section to the north with the pergola at the southern end of the garden. Traversing the length of the 43-meter side terraces, two petite walled water channels flow from north to south, surrounded by lawns and planting beds. At regular intervals, the channel walls exhibit three circular loops, enhancing both aesthetics and structure. The water channels are fed by two round grotto-shaped niche fountains at the northern ends of the terraces. Both water channels lead to rectangular water lily ponds just before the transverse pergola, which is densely planted with a variety of aquatic and marsh plants. Irises, callas, mad-dog weed, and arrowheads are a few examples.

While the western side terrace ends below the Victorian garden in front of the house, the eastern side terrace ends beneath the rotunda, which connects the garden sections below the house with the Orangery and Dutch Garden to the east of the main house.

For the central garden element, the partially circular intertwined water channels, Gertrud Jekyll drew inspiration from the intricate patterns of traditional needlework. In addition, distinct Italianate and Moorish-Islamic influences are evident.

=== The eastern part of the garden ===
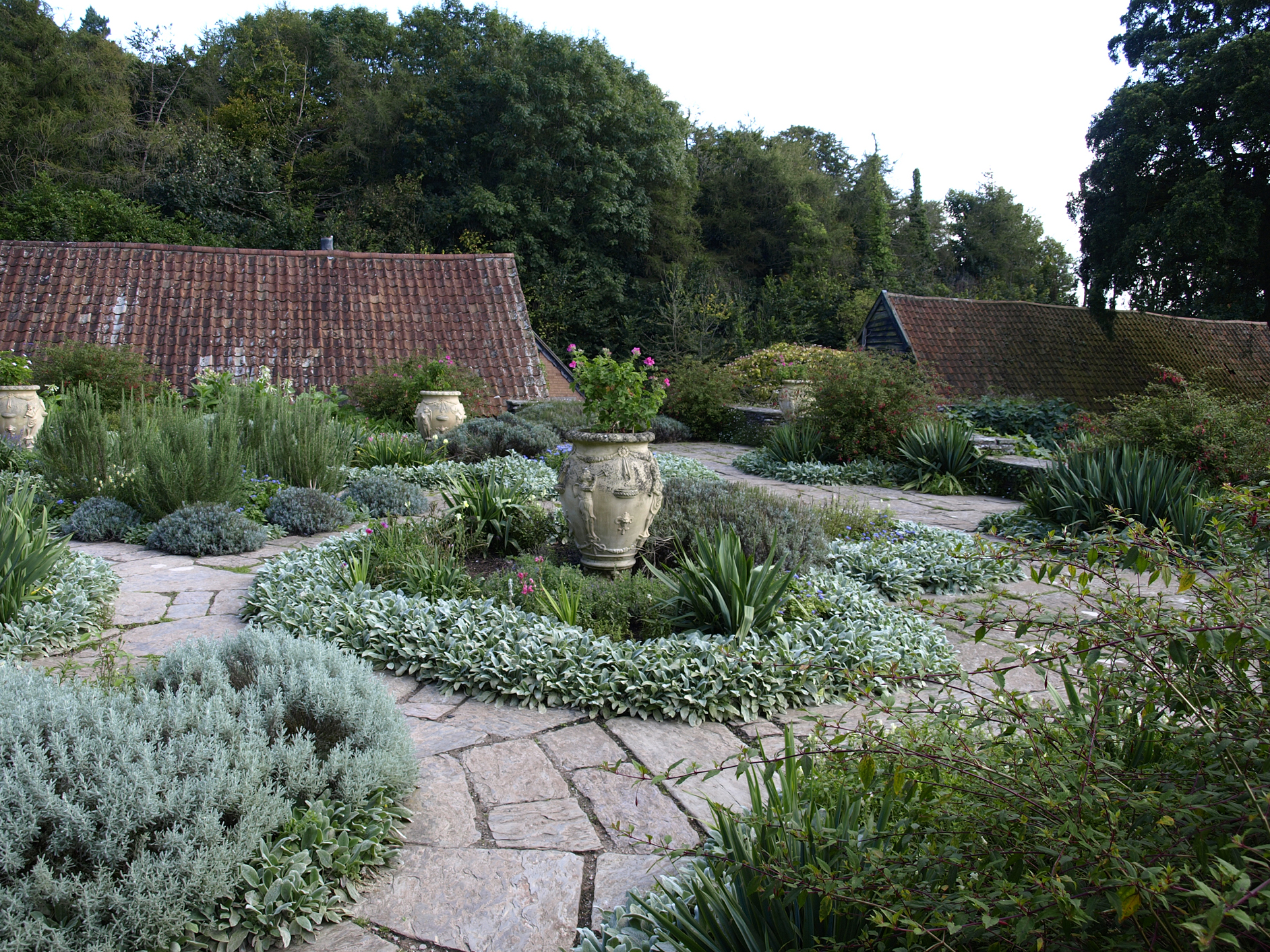
The "Dutch Garden" in the eastern part of the garden

The part of the garden that closes off to the east essentially consists of three parts: the rotunda, a rectangular orangery in the center, and the acclaimed Dutch Garden as its conclusion. This entire complex follows the contours of the main house, which recedes on the eastern side, and thus has a slightly northeasterly orientation.

The rotunda serves as both a connector to the adjacent eastern terrace and a seamless transition to the Victorian terrace and garden on the southern forefront of the main house. The rotunda is a circular courtyard with a central circular water basin. The courtyard is surrounded by substantial walls of rubble stone with niches set into them. The adjoining orangery was intended to serve as a private retreat for the family. Lutyens' architectural rendition, inspired by Christopher Wren, is graced by geometric lawn panels, creating a haven of tranquility. The Dutch Garden is structured in a square design, featuring four primary polygonal shrub beds alongside numerous additional circular, square, or polygonal planting beds. Lutyens himself conceived decorative elements like ornamental tubs or vases, further enhancing these arrangements.

Within the Dutch Garden, perennial beds predominantly showcase a white-silver palette. Large white-flowered Yucca gloriosa stand as vertical focal points, with accents of purple-flowered dwarf lavender (Lavandula), catmint (Nepeta), silvery Stachys, Santolina, and rosemary. Colorfully contrasted from them are also used China roses and fuchsia (Fuchsia magellanica).

== Planting plans and concepts ==
Gertrud Jekyll's planting plans for the formal garden at Hestercombe Gardens were extremely complex and included a variety of carefully matched perennial species and cultivars as well as summer flowering plants. To accomplish this, she used and mixed native cultivated plants with simple wild herbs and exotic plants from other continents. She often combined flowering plants with foliage plants in order to emphasize the color effect of the flowers even more with suitable, color-contrasting foliage colors.

The landscaping work done in Hestercombe Gardens had a strengthening and a mitigating impact on the architecture. The strict regularity and order of the architectural components served as a kind of framework for Gertrud Jekyll's "plant pictures," or herbaceous and floral borders. Jekyll was a trained painter who infused the color scheme of the plants with her own impressionistic inspirations and ways of seeing.

As a trained painter, she brought her own impressionist influences and ways of seeing into the color composition of the plant arrangements. It is well known that Jekyll drew inspiration for her use of colors and tones from the celebrated English landscape artist J.M.W. Turner, whose canvases she meticulously studied during her formative years at London's National Gallery.

However, because of the extensive horticultural work, the planting plans designed for the formal garden were not viable over time. Even during the extensive restoration of the formal garden that commenced in 1973, the perennial and summer flower beds were not replanted exactly; rather, they were reimagined in a more streamlined manner, according to Jekyll's original design blueprint.

== Garden architecture ==
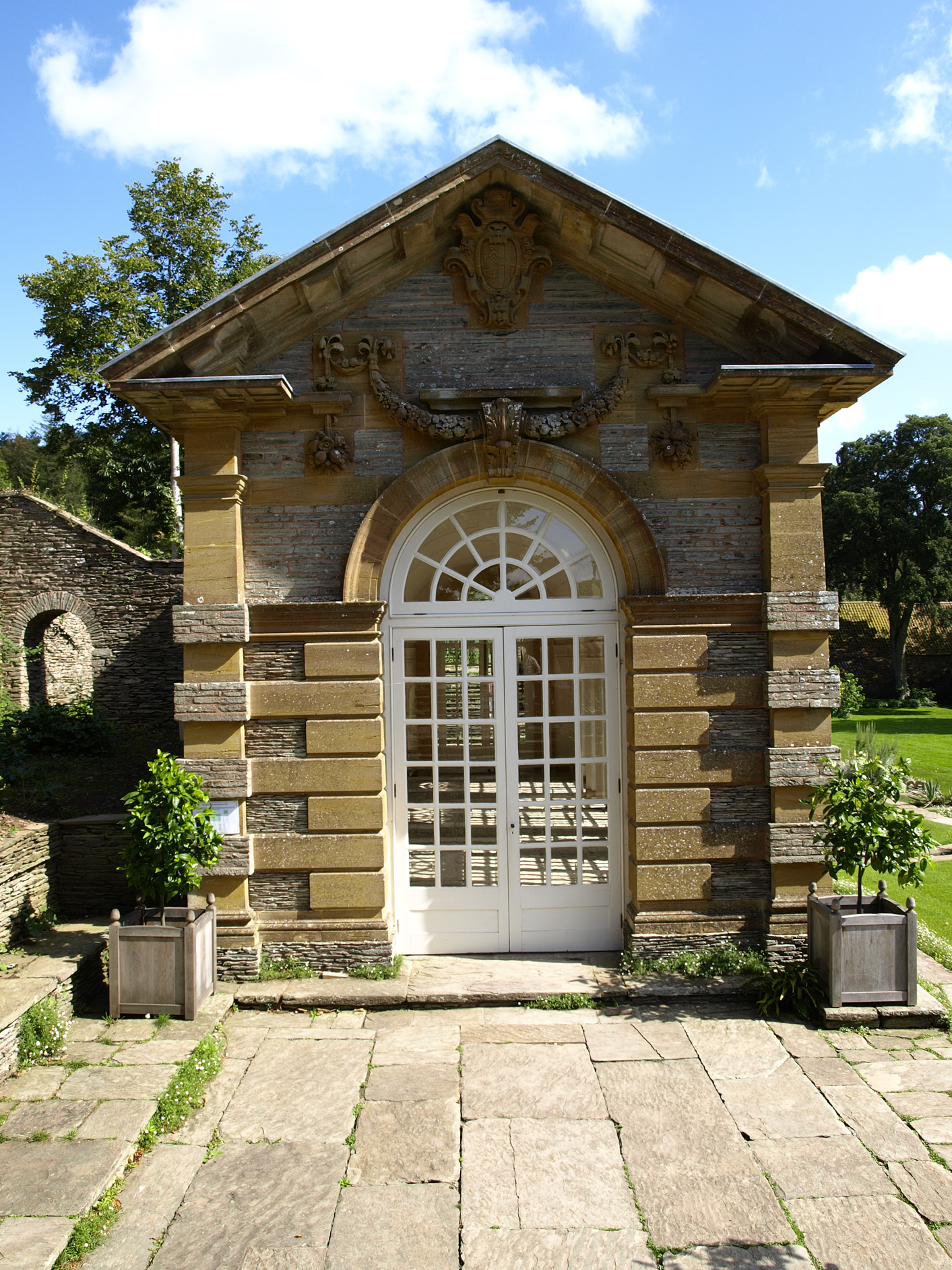
Orangery in the southern part of the garden

Edward Lutyens held exclusive responsibility for the construction planning, architectural facets of the formal garden, and the selection and use of the building elements and materials required for it. The manor house was not included, thus he planned the garden with a perspective away from the house. Lutyens incorporated Hestercombe House's natural surroundings and, most importantly, the view of the southwest English countryside that was available to him in order to achieve this goal. The garden is intended to be perceived by the visitor as a diversely created area.

The outcome was a formal garden. Lutyens got ideas from different time periods for this garden's style. For instance, the idea of a square, well-structured lower area with terraces along the sides and higher up was seen in the 16th and 17th centuries. The elevated Dutch Garden is interpreted in today's view of the garden as a reminiscence of the Dutch influence on English Tudor gardens Similarly, the Orangerie is situated beside the main parterre. It also follows a historical architectural style and intentionally imitates the design of Christopher Wren. Lutyens also focused on how the lines of sight interacted in each garden area. This idea can be seen in Italian Renaissance models like Villa Lante. Furthermore, the existing water basins and canals evoke elements of architectural garden concepts characterizing the 19th century.

Inspired by this way and further developing his ideas, Lutyens preferred geometric structures in the layout of the garden areas, which alternated in many cases. As a result, Hestercombe Gardens have many elevation changes with stairs going up and down, aligned views, pergolas, vantage points (called "vistas"), and water features like basins and channels. Lutyens was careful to make sure that the buildings complemented the garden rather than overpowering it. He intentionally designed connections between the stonework and the plants, like the vegetation on the tall terrace walls of the side garden spaces.

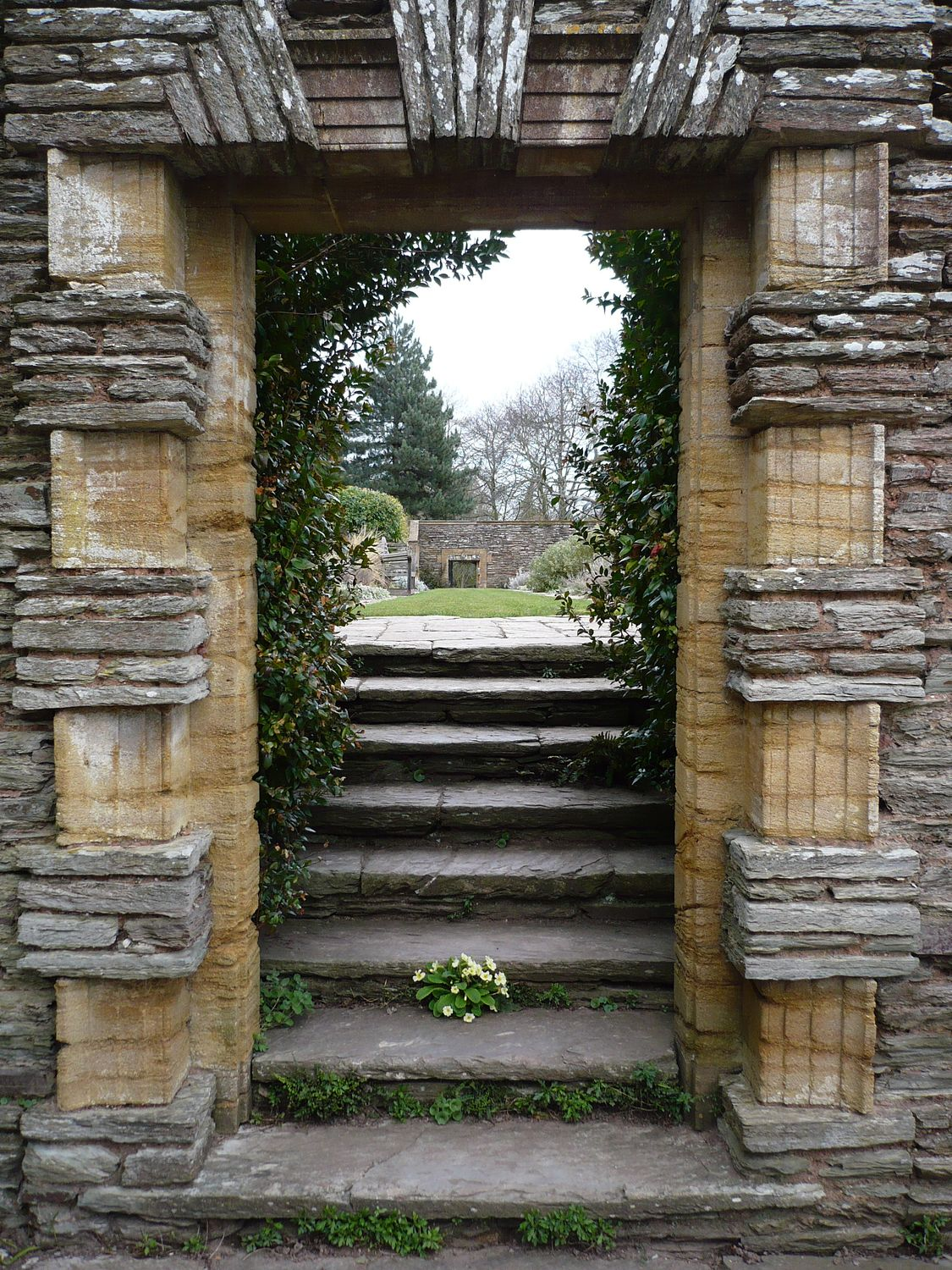
Passage door with different stone materials

Lutyens was known for paying close attention to the materials used in his architectural designs. He liked to use regionally occurring types of stone for this purpose, as in the formal garden of Hestercombe Gardens. Here, the so-called "Ham-Hill stone", a warm sand-colored type of sandstone, was used to a great extent. This sandstone was used primarily to build niches, balustrades, stair railings, and the Orangery as a large structure. Locally occurring slate (native Lias, called Morte) was used on a larger scale, mainly for walls, stone slabs, step installations, or water basins. Lutyens adopted the technique of building dry-stone walls using shale layers, a method commonly found in the southwest of England where the garden is located. Walls of this type could be planted over large areas without great difficulty, a circumstance that Jekyll took advantage of to further develop the connection between plants and architecture that is encountered time and again. The large pergola was also constructed of slate. The alternating square and round columns were layered from uniformly thin natural stones. As a further design element, the building material used was processed and used in different ways, such as quarry stone, finely cut, or polished.

Lutyens provided a certain rusticity by using native stone types in alternating shapes and colors. This was not typical of gardens of the early Edwardian period but clearly shows the influence of the Arts and Crafts movement on him.

== Collaboration of Gertrude Jekyll and Sir Edwin Lutyens ==
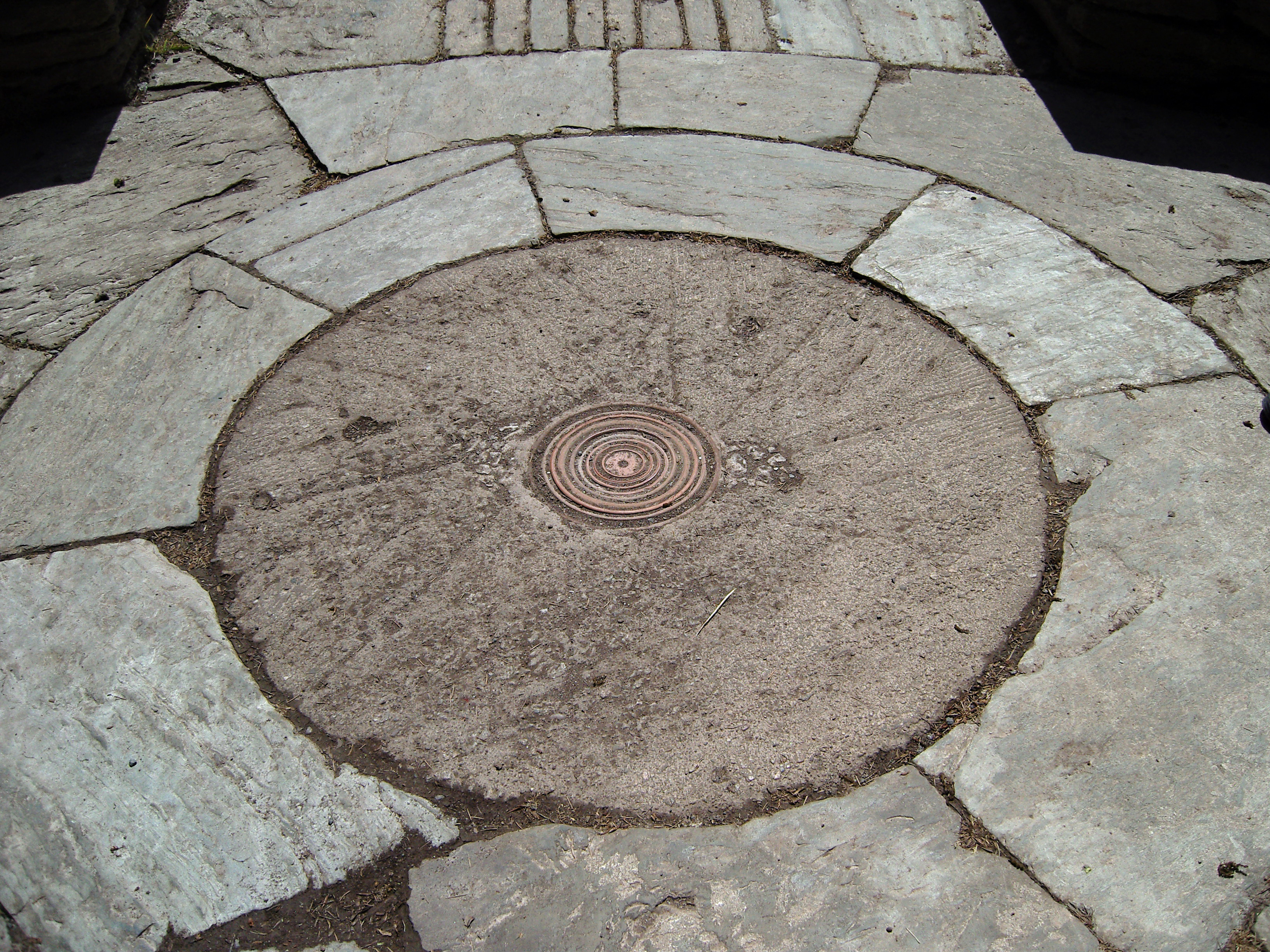
Paving with different sized flower pots in the middle

The productive collaboration between the gardener (as she called herself) Gertrud Jekyll and the much younger architect Edward Lutyens began in 1896 and lasted until 1912, during which time they designed around 100 gardens together. Throughout their collaboration, Lutyens undertook the design of structures, conceived the spatial order of the garden, and planned the structural details. On the other hand, Jekyll assumed the role of curating planting schemes, ensuring botanical arrangements, and evaluating the holistic interplay between architectural forms and vegetation.

Typical of this collaboration was the synthesis of formalism and architecture with naturalism and nature through the finely tuned selection of plants. Lutyens provided the formal backbone of the site and ensured that the house and the open space were harmoniously intertwined. Jekyll added to this by creating border arrangements that matched in color and texture. Experts widely agree that Jekyll's contribution elevated the status of herbaceous borders in garden design. This was achieved by merging her horticultural expertise with artistic aspirations. Collaboratively, Jekyll and Lutyens crafted garden arrangements characterized by segmented layouts, visual focal points, and varied elevations. They incorporated artistic staircases and paving, often using local materials. Water elements and appropriately adapted plantings were consistent features as well.

The formal garden at Hestercombe Gardens marked the initial significant collaboration between Jekyll and Lutyens in this style. Their partnership swiftly gained recognition within the English landed gentry circles. Lutyens, previously a less-known architect, benefited from Jekyll's influential connections. Around 1900, the statement "A Lutyens House with a Jekyll garden" was the epitome of the finest English lifestyle. The well-known English garden writer Penelope Hobhouse writes about this:

"The collaboration between architect Edwin Lutyens and gardener Gertrude Jekyll became the epitome of good taste and perfection for a generation on the brink of the abyss that threatened the First World War. Together, architecture and planting strategy created aesthetic and horticultural works, few of which survive in their original state, but whose influence resonates in countless gardens."

== Assessment in garden architecture and history ==
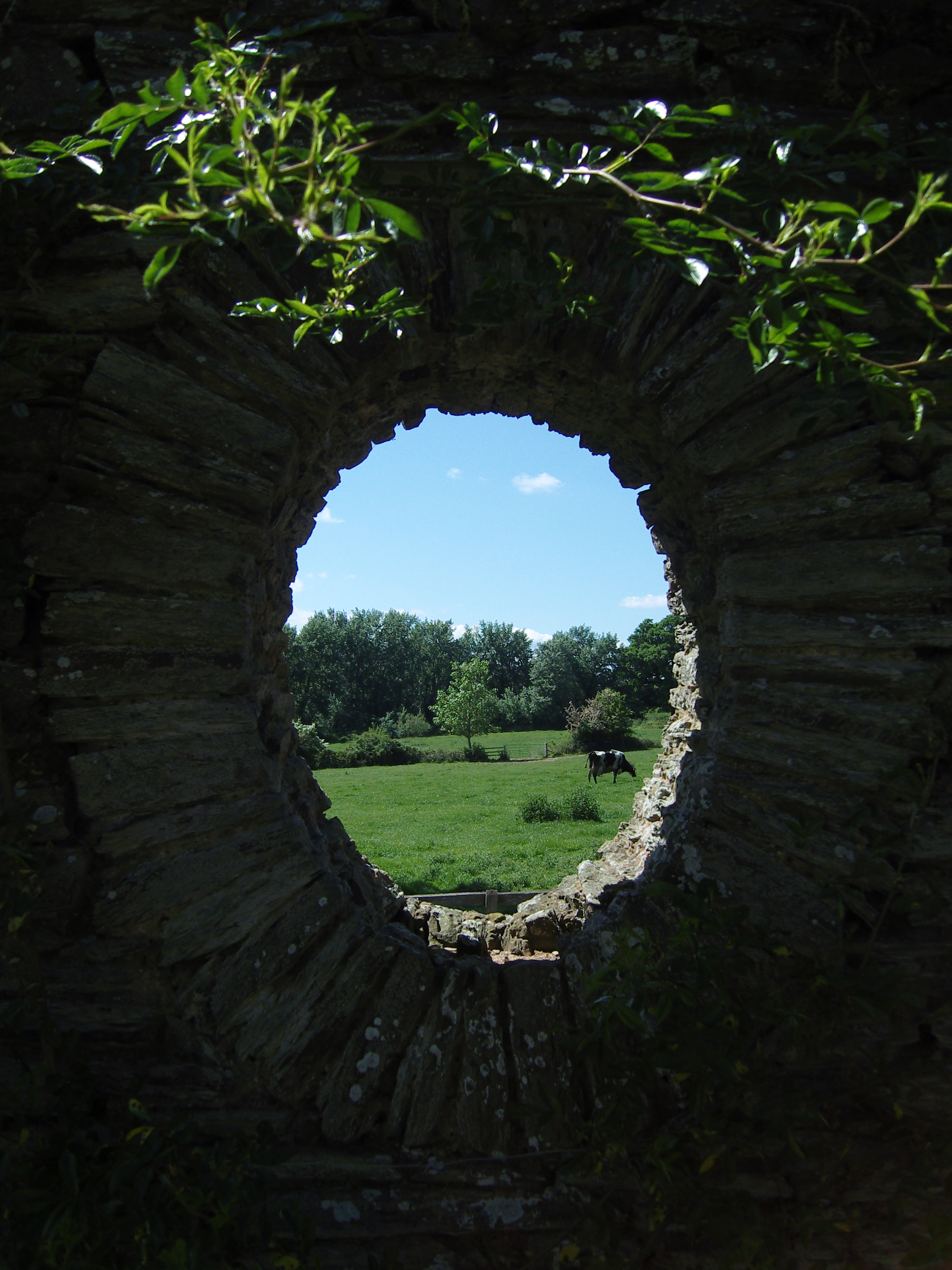
Oval recess in a wall overlooking the surrounding landscape

Landscape architects and garden historians consider the formal garden at Hestercombe an exemplary collaboration between Gertrude Jekyll and Edwin Lutyens. The design pairs formal architectural grounds with lush, naturalistic planting, demonstrating how structured terraces can integrate into the surrounding landscape.

Simultaneously, Hestercombe Gardens stands as an important contemporary manifestation of the Arts and Crafts movement that gained popularity at the time. Both Lutyens and Jekyll sympathized in many ways with this movement, both social and artistic. Fundamental principles of the movement, such as closeness to nature and solid craftsmanship, or material fairness in the selection of building resources, were consistently implemented here. Hence, an assessment of Hestercombe Gardens also reads, "The charm of Hestercombe lies in the subtle linking of the different levels, the changing vantage points, and above all in the harmonious selection of planting and building materials."

In the evolution of garden art in England, Hestercombe Gardens is an important milestone and consequently also belongs to the most important listed gardens of the 20th century. The garden symbolizes a departure from the Victorian representation garden with its carpet beds and historicizing elements and the extensive English landscape garden towards the architectural garden. Aspects of natural plant growth became more important again. Ultimately, Hestercombe Gardens played a pivotal role in shaping the typical image of a lushly planted English country house garden, which in this form is a portrayal of rural England to countless gardening enthusiasts.

== Awards ==
The garden complex was awarded the European Garden Award in 2016 in the category "Best Further Development of a Historic Park or Garden.
