= Salvation Army Hall =

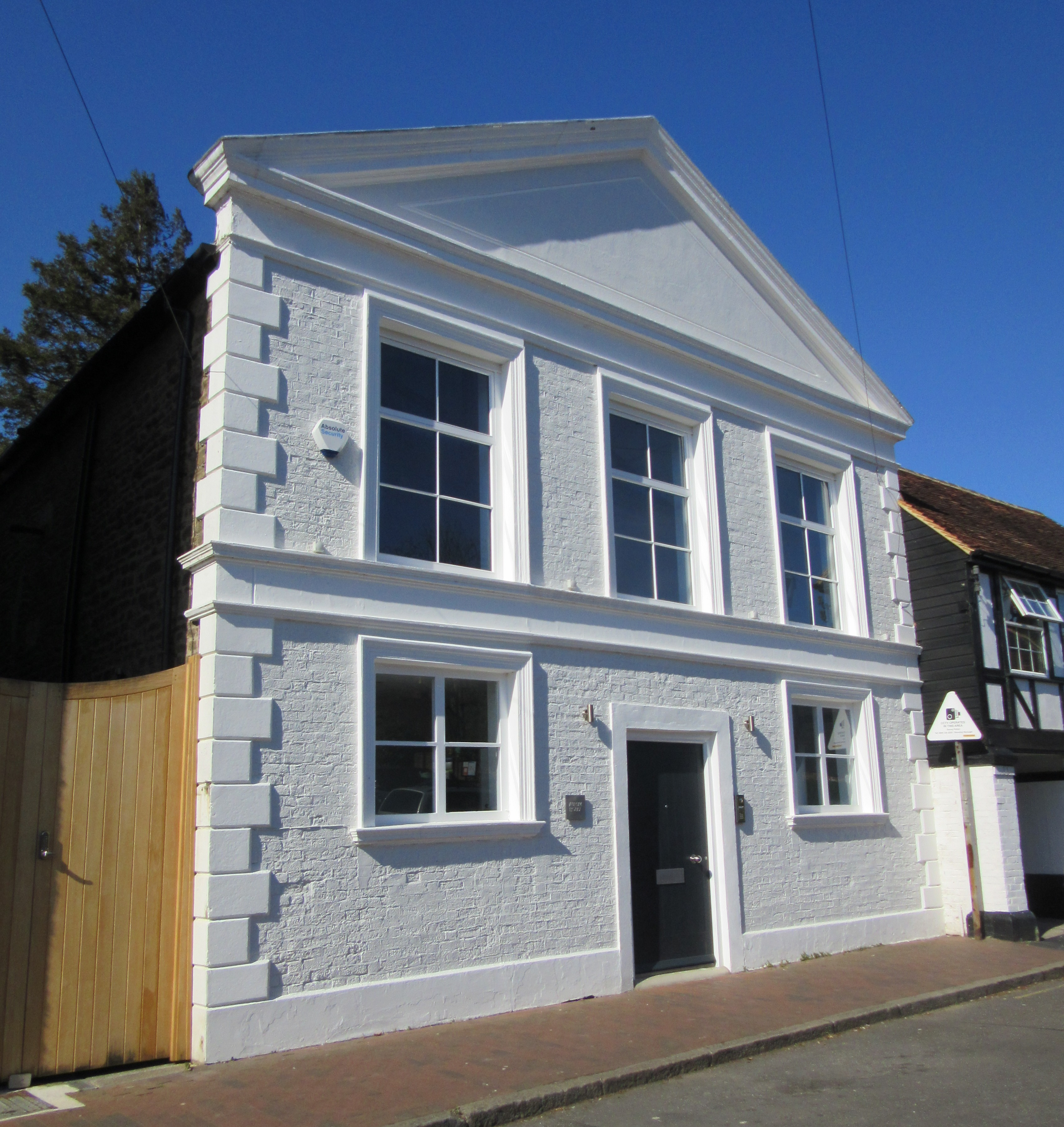
- The former Salvation Army hall in 2015 after conversion into an office

Location map and quick summary
Location within Surrey
51.185817°N 0.616632°W
Location	18 Mint Street, Godalming, Surrey GU7 1HE
Country	England
Denomination	The Salvation Army
Previous denomination	Congregational; Methodist
History
Former name(s)	Ebenezer Chapel; Godalming Methodist Chapel
Founded	c. 1730
Architecture
Functional status	Closed
Heritage designation	Grade II
Designated	21 August 1990
Style	Classical
Years built	c. 1830
Closed	29 September 2012

The former Salvation Army Hall in Godalming, Surrey, England, now an office building known as Aurum House, has been used by three religious groups since its construction c. 1830. The ancient town in the English county of Surrey has a long and diverse history of Protestant Nonconformity, and three Nonconformst denominations are represented: at first it served Congregationalists, but when they built a larger chapel in the town it passed to the Methodist Church. In the 20th century it was occupied by The Salvation Army, but it closed in 2012 and was redeveloped for commercial use. The building has been listed at Grade II for its architectural and historical importance.

== History ==
Godalming is an ancient town with mainly industrial origins, which were conducive to the spread of Nonconformism. Attendances at conventicles exceeded those at the parish church, St Peter and St Paul's, where the Anglo-Catholic views of the priest in the late 17th century did not represent the majority of inhabitants, who were "overwhelmingly Puritan in belief and practice". Numerous informal Nonconformist groups developed in and around Godalming at this time.

One such group was Congregationalists, which had a sufficient following by 1730 they acquired land on Hart's Lane and built a chapel. The congregation "may be considered ... the lineal representative of the conventicle of the reign of Charles II", which had 700–800 worshippers every Sunday at a time when Godalming's population was 3,000. Hart's Lane, now known as Mint Street, is one of several small streets immediately west of the town centre, characterised by small, unrestored 16th- and 17th-century cottages. (Proposals to demolish these streets and all the buildings in favour of a ring road were made in 1969 but were not acted upon.) The land for the chapel was bought for £20 in January 1729, and construction soon followed. Ebenezer Chapel, as it was called, was put under the charge of the Surrey Congregational Mission in 1799. In the early 19th century it was served by a succession of student pastors from Homerton College, Cambridge. One, John Nelson Goulty, later came to prominence during his 37-year incumbency at Union Chapel, Brighton. During his much shorter stay in Godalming, "the cause considerably revived" and he also preached in the nearby villages of Elstead and Hascombe.

The building was extended at the rear in 1821 as the congregation grew, then in about 1830 it was rebuilt on the same site at a cost of £634. By January 1867, though, the congregation had expanded so much that a new chapel was needed, and the trustees decided to sell the Mint Street building. Land at Bridge Street was found and purchased and the new Congregational chapel was quickly built, opening on 28 October 1868. The former chapel was then bought by a group of Wesleyan Methodists for £450, and they converted it into Godalming's first permanent Methodist chapel. (A Methodist group had existed for some years until 1797, and meetings recommenced in 1826 in a hired room; a small chapel was also built at Farncombe, the neighbouring village, in 1840.) As Godalming Wesleyan Chapel it opened in 1869, and the congregation grew steadily. It was in turn replaced by a new church—the Hugh Price Hughes Memorial Chapel (now Godalming United Church)—on Bridge Street, almost opposite the Congregational chapel, in 1903. The Methodist Church retained the Mint Street building at first and leased it to a Salvation Army congregation, then sold it to them in 1918. Alterations were made in 1930, and the windows were also replaced in the 20th century. In 1990 the building was reported to be "in a state of disrepair", but further alterations were made by 1994. The Salvation Army stopped using the hall with effect from 29 September 2012. A planning application to convert the disused hall into an office was submitted in May 2013 and approved by Waverley Borough Council two months later.

While it was still in use by the Salvation Army, the building was listed at Grade II on 21 August 1990. Such buildings are defined as "nationally important and of special interest". As of February 2001, it was one of 1,548 Grade II listed buildings and 1,661 listed buildings of all grades in the Borough of Waverley, the local government district in which Godalming is situated. It was also licensed for worship in accordance with the Places of Worship Registration Act 1855 and had the registration number 39828. It is one of several current and former places of worship in Godalming with listed status: the Quaker meeting house on Mill Street, St Edmund's Roman Catholic Church, Meadrow Unitarian Chapel and the Congregational church on Bridge Street (which superseded the Mint Street building but which is no longer in religious use) are all Grade II-listed, and St Peter and St Paul's parish church has Grade I status.

== Architecture ==
The walls of the building are of Bargate stone rubble. The coarse, light-brown sandstone was quarried locally for many years and was used in many medieval and 19th-century churches. There are brick dressings to the stonework and rusticated quoins, and the façade is of brick laid in the Flemish bond pattern and painted over. The three-bay façade faces Mint Street and is topped by a gabled pediment with an entablature. There are three bays to the side elevations as well. The entrance is centrally placed with one window (set into an architrave) on each side. The rear and side elevations have arched windows, unlike those at the front which are straight-headed. Inside, when inspected in the 1990s, a pulpit stood on the north wall between the windows, and there had been a gallery on the south wall which was replaced with a room on the upper storey.

== See also ==
- List of places of worship in Waverley (borough)
