= Park Lane Chapel, Farnham =

Park Lane Chapel
- Park Lane Strict Baptist Chapel
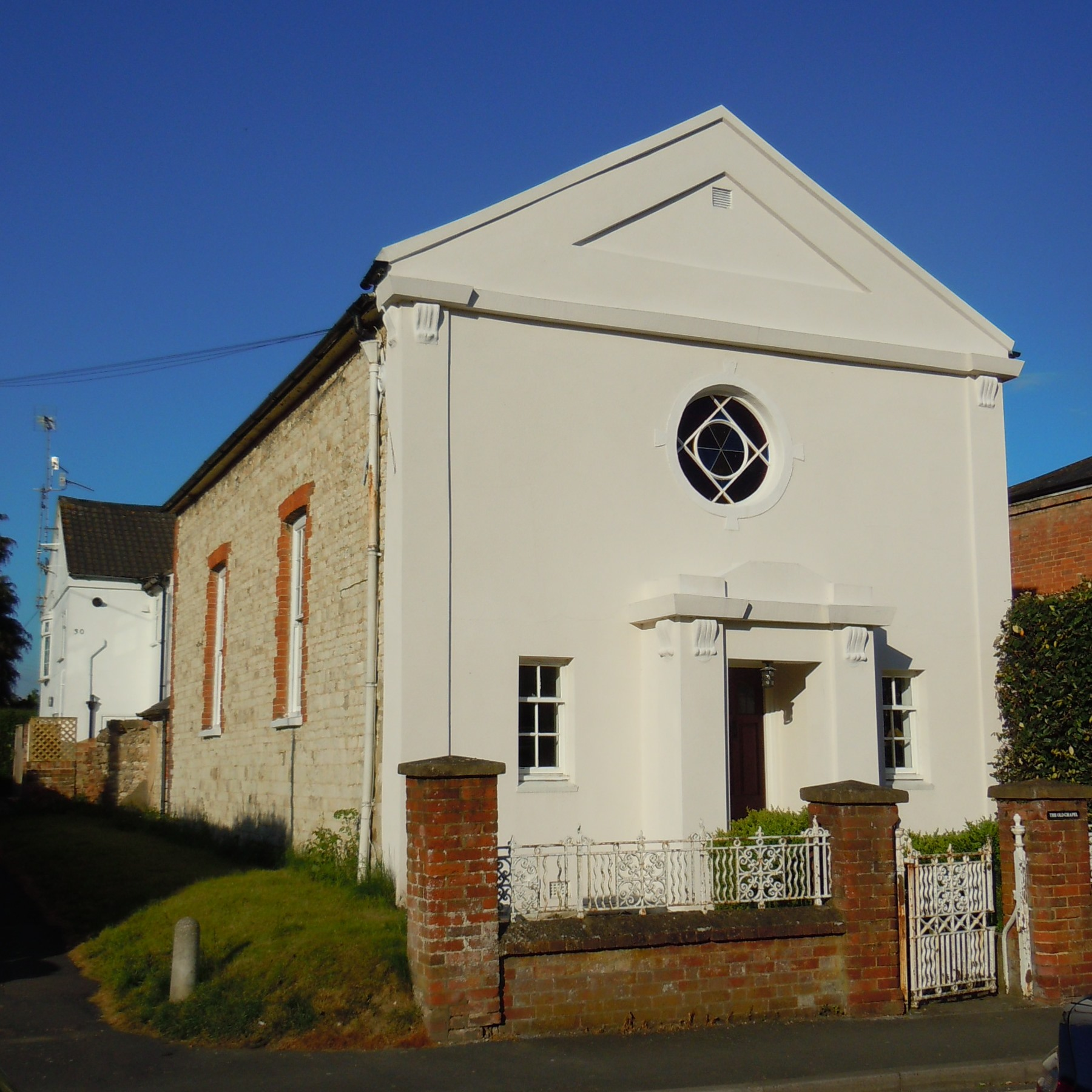
- The former chapel from the west

- Location within Surrey
- 51°13′00″N 0°47′55″W
- OS grid reference: SU 84012 47061
- Location: Bear Lane, Farnham, Surrey GU9 7LF
- Country: England
- Denomination: Baptist
- Churchmanship: Strict Baptist

History
- Status: Chapel
- Founded: c. 1844
- Founder: Nisan (Edward) Samuel

Architecture
- Functional status: Closed
- Heritage designation: Grade II
- Designated: 29 December 1972
- Style: Classical
- Completed: 9 April 1852
- Closed: c. 1994

The building formerly known as Park Lane Chapel is a former Strict Baptist chapel in the ancient town of Farnham in Surrey, England. Now a house, it was in religious use for nearly 150 years and housed a congregation whose origins go back to informal meetings in the 1840s. After Nisan Samuel, a Polish Jew, arrived in England and converted to Christianity, he took charge of these ad hoc meetings and formalised them into a Strict Baptist church. After he moved on, the congregation bought land and built a chapel. The small stone and brick building has been listed at Grade II for its architectural and historical importance.

== History ==
Protestant Nonconformist Christian denominations have a long history in the market town of Farnham: Congregational and Presbyterian groups were well established by the late 17th century and had joined in 1793 to form Ebenezer Chapel. (Note: Its successor, now called Farnham United Reformed Church, is still in use.) Augustus Toplady, Anglican cleric and hymnwriter, held Calvinist views; and the ejection in 1782 of popular curate William Gunn from the parish church encouraged the formation of small, informal groups which worshipped according to Nonconformist doctrines.

In 1812, in a town called Vinooty in Russian Poland, Nisan Samuel was born. Named after the Jewish month of his birth, he was part of a locally prominent Jewish family. He was forced to leave the country to escape persecution, and "wander[ed] over the continent, where he was befriended by Baron Rothschild". Initially he settled in London, where he met a Jew who had converted to Christianity. He became interested in the Christian religion and became a convert himself, associating at first with the Established Church (the Church of England). At this point he changed his name to Edward Samuel. In the early 1840s, he started to explore Nonconformism, and was invited to preach at numerous small gatherings of Independents and Strict Baptists. Around this time he was also baptised.

In c. 1844 he was invited to preach at Farnham, where a group of people aligned to no particular denomination met informally for worship in a loft above a building. They asked him to take charge of the cause, and he formed it into a formal church along Strict Baptist lines. About a year later Samuel left and took up a pastorate at Hitchin. He went on to write The Triumph of Christ on the Cross, as God-man over sin and the sinner; to which is prefixed, an account of the early life, conversion, and call to the ministry of the Author in 1857, and was associated for many years with a Strict Baptist cause at Sleaford.

The church continued to meet in the loft, said to be infested with pigeons, until George Turner became pastor in 1850 and made plans to build a chapel. The church bought a site on Bear Lane, a 250-capacity chapel was erected, and the first service was held on 9 April 1853 (Good Friday). It was licensed for worship in accordance with the Places of Worship Registration Act 1855 with the registration number 19715, and was registered for marriages in June 1870. In the mid-1950s it was stated that "church life [had been] quiet and uneventful" since the chapel opened, and that although it still had its own pastor (rather than relying on supply pastors or laypersons) until 1924, the congregation was in decline. The building was sold for conversion into a house in around 1994.

While it was still in religious use, the chapel was designated a Grade II listed building on 29 December 1972. Such buildings are defined as "nationally important and of special interest". As of February 2001, it was one of 1,548 Grade II listed buildings and 1,661 listed buildings of all grades in the Borough of Waverley, the local government district of which Farnham is the largest town.

== Architecture ==
Park Lane Chapel is one of several small chapels built for Strict Baptists in the early to mid-19th century in Surrey. The walls are of clunch rubble laid in courses, and the west-facing frontage is coated with stucco. The doorway is recessed below a straight-headed porch. There is a datestone on the façade, and above the doorway is a rose window and a pediment. The roof is laid with slates. There are two windows to each of the side elevations (facing north and south); these are dressed with red brick and have a slight segmental arch. As originally built, the interior was single-storey. The boundary walls and iron railings in front of the chapel are included in the Grade II listing.

== See also ==
- List of places of worship in Waverley (borough)
- Media related to Park Lane Chapel, Farnham at Wikimedia Commons

== Bibliography ==
- Chambers, Ralph (1952). The Strict Baptist Chapels of England: Surrey and Hampshire. Vol. 1. Thornton Heath: Ralph Chambers.
- Samuel, Edward (2002). Samuel of Sleaford: The Life of Edward Samuel the Converted Jew. Harpenden: Gospel Standard Trust Publications. ISBN 1-897837-35-6.
- Stell, Christopher (2002). Nonconformist Chapels and Meeting-houses in Eastern England. Swindon: English Heritage. ISBN 1-873592-50-7.
