= List of places of worship in Waverley (borough) =

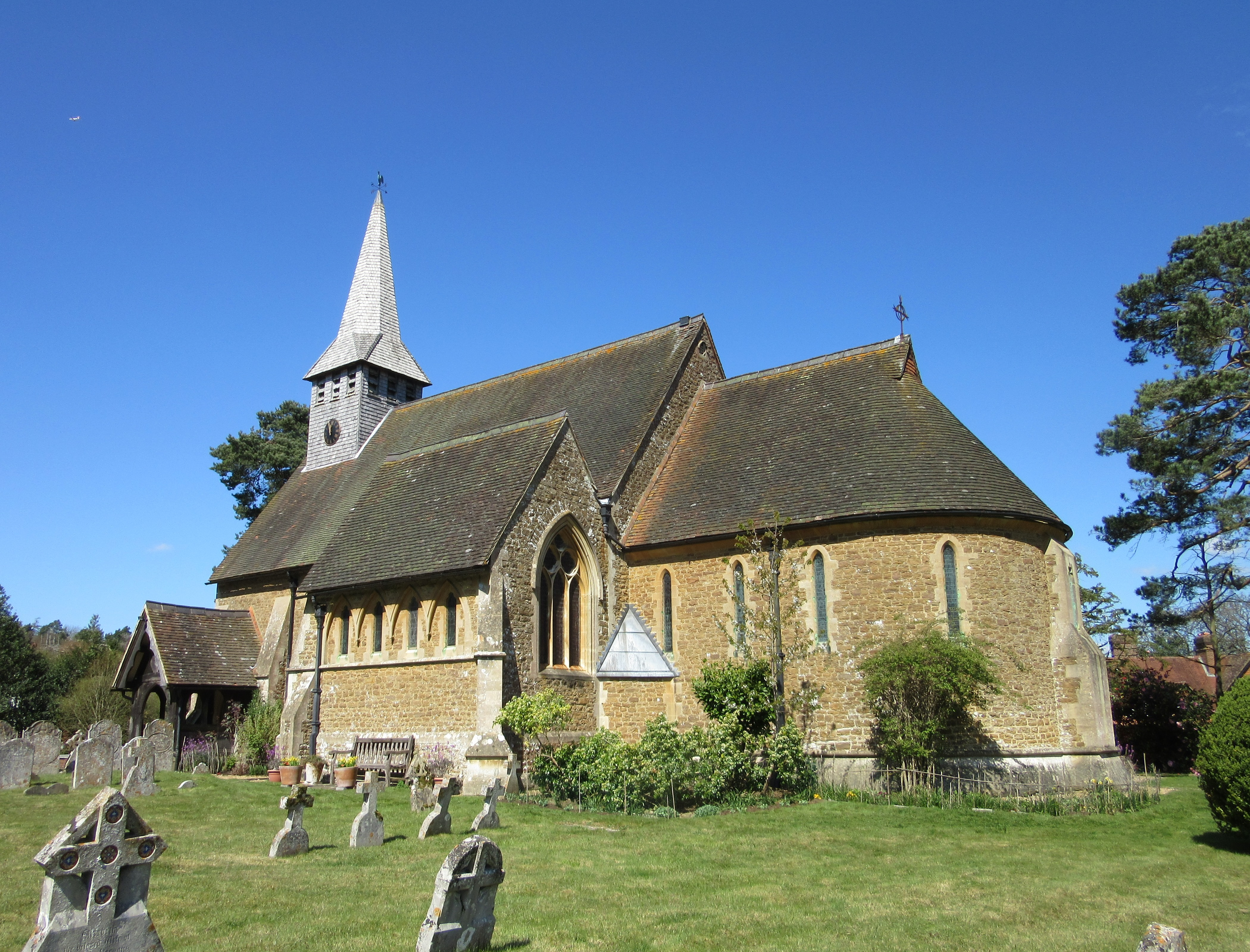
St Peter's Church at Hascombe (1864, by Henry Woodyer) is one of Waverley borough's Victorian village churches.

As of 2022, there are more than 110 current and former places of worship in the borough of Waverley in Surrey, England. Various Christian denominations own and use 89 churches, chapels and halls across the borough, and a further 26 buildings no longer serve a religious function but survive in alternative uses. Waverley is the largest of 11 local government districts in the county of Surrey—a small inland county south of London. The borough is largely rural: there are some small towns and dozens of villages and hamlets. Many of these have ancient parish churches, and other places of worship were established in the 18th, 19th and 20th centuries.

The 2011 United Kingdom census reported that the majority of residents are Christian. The largest number of churches in Waverley belong to the Church of England—the country's Established Church—but Roman Catholicism and Protestant Nonconformism are also well represented, the latter particularly in the ancient towns of Farnham and Godalming. Congregationalist churches can be traced back to the 17th century in the borough, Unitarianism and the Religious Society of Friends (Quakers) have a long history in Godalming, and Methodists and Baptists each have several congregations. Other denominations and groups represented in the borough include Christian Scientists, Jehovah's Witnesses, the Assemblies of God and the Plymouth Brethren Christian Church.

Historic England has awarded listed status to 38 current and seven former places of worship in Waverley borough. A building is defined as "listed" when it is placed on a statutory register of buildings of "special architectural or historic interest" in accordance with the Planning (Listed Buildings and Conservation Areas) Act 1990. The Department for Culture, Media and Sport, a Government department, is responsible for this; Historic England, a non-departmental public body, acts as an agency of the department to administer the process and advise the department on relevant issues. There are three grades of listing status. Grade I, the highest, is defined as being of "exceptional interest"; Grade II* is used for "particularly important buildings of more than special interest"; and Grade II, the lowest, is used for buildings of "special interest". As of February 2001, there were 21 Grade I-listed buildings, 92 with Grade II* status and 1,548 Grade II-listed buildings in the borough.

== Overview of the borough and its places of worship ==
Waverley borough is in the southwest of Surrey.

Waverley is a largely rural district situated in the southwest of the county of Surrey. Its estimated population in 2013 was 122,400, a slight increase on the figure of 121,572 recorded in the 2011 United Kingdom census. At 133 square miles (340 km^{2}) it is the county's largest district, but the majority of the land is given over to agriculture or woodland and there are only four major settlements: the ancient towns of Farnham (population 39,765), Godalming (21,983) and Haslemere (17,010), and the village of Cranleigh which has expanded rapidly in the postwar era and had a population of 11,492 on census day in 2011. The borough has borders with the Surrey boroughs of Guildford and Mole Valley, Horsham District and Chichester District in West Sussex, and the Hampshire local authorities of East Hampshire, Hart and Rushmoor. The majority of the land area is part of the Metropolitan Green Belt and/or the Surrey Hills Area of Outstanding Natural Beauty, while the four main towns together take up less than 10% of the land area.

There were Roman fortifications around Hascombe and Farnham, but the early history of this part of Surrey is obscure until the Saxon period, when several churches were built. (Note: In this section, when only the name of a town or village is shown, the Anglican parish church is being referred to.) Thursley and Witley's parish churches retain some fabric from that era, and 21st-century excavations at St Andrew's Church, Farnham showed that it was built on the site of a Saxon church. Architecturally there was a major change after the Norman Conquest of England, but none of Surrey's complete Norman-style churches are in Waverley and the most extensive surviving fabric from that time can be found at Witley and Ewhurst. At the latter, a lot of 12th-century work remains, but the building partly collapsed in the 19th century and had to be reconstructed. Otherwise, only the fonts at Alfold and Thursley, and some wall paintings at Witley, demonstrate how this area of Surrey's churches would have appeared during the Norman era.

Gothic architecture, specifically the Early English style, became established in Surrey in the 13th century and is discernible in many of Waverley Borough's churches. Godalming's windows and "large, impressive lead spire" are of this era, and churches such as Bramley, Chiddingfold, Elstead and Frensham retain varying amounts of 13th-century fabric; but Dunsfold is one of only two complete 13th-century churches in the whole of Surrey—the other is at Byfleet, not far from Waverley's borders in the Borough of Woking. Likewise, only Cranleigh shows what a 14th-century-style Surrey church looked like—by which time the more elaborate Decorated Gothic style had evolved from the Early English style of the previous century.

The next period of significant church-building came in the 19th century, by which time many of the centuries-old churches in the towns and villages had fallen into disrepair. The Victorian era was characterised by the restoration of such churches, often by nationally prominent architects such as William Butterfield (Cranleigh), Benjamin Ferrey (Farnham St Andrew, Thursley) and Henry Woodyer (Bramley, Chiddingfold). Also, many new Anglican churches were built in the late 19th century as large parishes were carved up and villages gained a church for the first time. Again, major architects of the era were often involved. Woodyer, who lived at Grafham, designed the church there in 1861–64, Hascombe (1864) and St James, Farnham (1876); George Gilbert Scott worked on Farncombe (built in stages from 1847) and Busbridge (1865–67); Ewan Christian designed Tilford (1867) and Churt (1868), and Grayswood (1900–02) was by his pupil Axel Haig; Benjamin Ferrey was responsible for St John the Evangelist Church, Hale, Surrey (1844), C.H. Howell designed Shamley Green (1864); A.R.Barker designed St Mark the Evangelist Church, Upper Hale, Farnham (1883) and the unusual Mediterranean-influenced church at Blackheath Village (1893–95) was by C.H. Townsend.

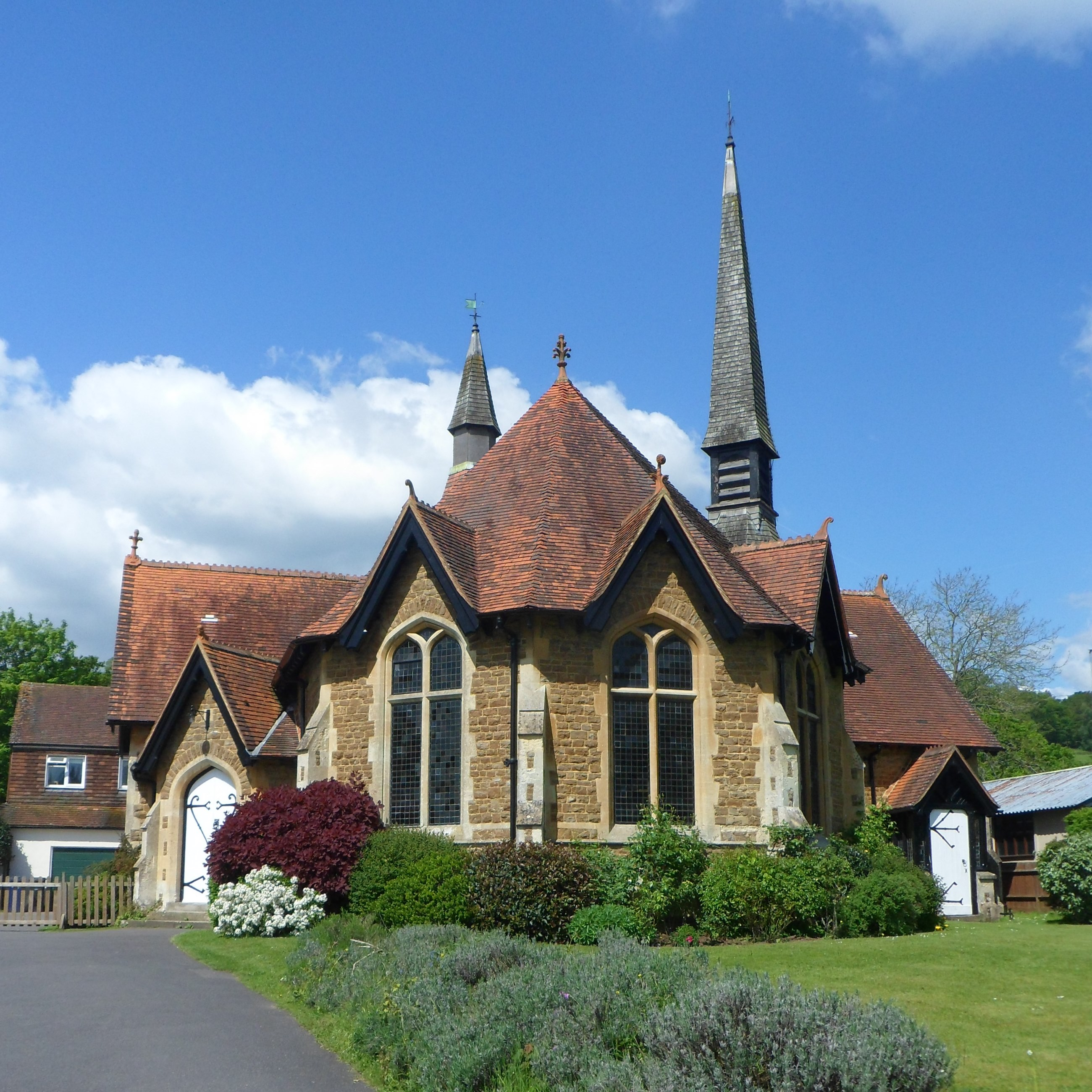
Wonersh United Reformed Church was originally one of many Congregational "out-stations" looked after by a main church—in this case, Guildford Congregational Church.

Protestant Nonconformism had several strongholds in Surrey, particularly in the west: Farnham has had numerous Nonconformist congregations since the 17th century, and Godalming was "a hotbed of radical Protestant Nonconformity". Some denominations were more successful than others: Surrey was part of the so-called "Methodist Wilderness", where "implacable opposition" to Wesley's mission was experienced until the early 20th century—especially in rural areas—and therefore few Methodist chapels became established. In contrast, the founding of the (initially interdenominational) Surrey Mission in 1797 gave great impetus to Congregational, Baptist and Independent groups throughout the 19th century, leaving a legacy of dozens of chapels, schools and associated institutions. Many congregations formed themselves into churches which have survived into the 21st century. Congregationalism was especially prominent: Godalming Congregational Church looked after "out-stations" (mission chapels) in Bowlhead Green, Elstead, Eashing, Wormley and Milford; Guildford's church was responsible for founding or maintaining the chapels at Compton, Shamley Green and Blackheath Village; and the church at Farnham administered mission chapels at Lower Bourne and Wrecclesham. General Baptist congregations developed in the late 19th century at Chiddingfold and Dunsfold, both with the help of local resident Samuel Barrow jp, and one was founded in Godalming around the same time. In the late 20th century, two former Congregational chapels—at Ewhurst and Milford—were taken over by Baptist groups, and a large Baptist church was built in Farnham in 1975. Strict Baptists had congregations at Cranleigh, Hale and Farnham; the first two subsequently adopted a General Baptist character, and Park Lane Chapel at Farnham (which was founded by an émigré Polish Jew who converted to Christianity) is no longer in religious use. A Strict Baptist chapel was founded in 1862 in Haslemere and remained in use until 2017. Methodism was most successful in the far southwest of the county. The Methodist Statistical Returns published in 1947 (Note: The statistical return was compiled between 1940 and 1947 with the aim of documenting all Methodist chapels extant at that time: their location, previous affiliation prior to the Methodist Union of 1932, capacity, building materials and similar details.) recorded the existence of chapels with Wesleyan Methodist origins at Cranleigh, Farnham, Godalming, Grayshott, Hale, Hascombe, Haslemere, Hindhead and Rowledge and a single ex-Primitive Methodist chapel at Badshot Lea. Only the late 19th-century churches at Farnham, Hale and Rowledge and those at Godalming (1903) and Cranleigh (1904) are still in use. Haslemere's original chapel was sold to another congregation in 1972 when a larger new church opened. The former Badshot Lea Primitive Methodist Chapel survives in secular use. The chapels at Farnham and Godalming are now home to joint Methodist and United Reformed congregations.

In contrast to Nonconformist denominations, Roman Catholicism was late to develop a presence in the area now covered by Waverley borough. At the end of the 19th century Captain W.H. Rushbrooke of Bowlhead Green, "a very faithful supporter ... and a great benefactor [of] the Catholic Church", helped to found and pay for St Edmund King and Martyr's Church at Godalming and the predecessor of St Joan of Arc's Church at Farnham. Until that time local Catholics travelled to Sutton Place near Woking or (from 1860) to Guildford. Catholic churches at Haslemere and Bramley were originally within Godalming's vast parish, and Milford's church is still within it. The Hindhead area was served by a private chapel from the 1930s until St Anselm's Church was built in the 1950s. The eastern part of the borough was served by the friary church at Chilworth from 1945 until the Franciscan friars took the decision to withdraw in 2010.

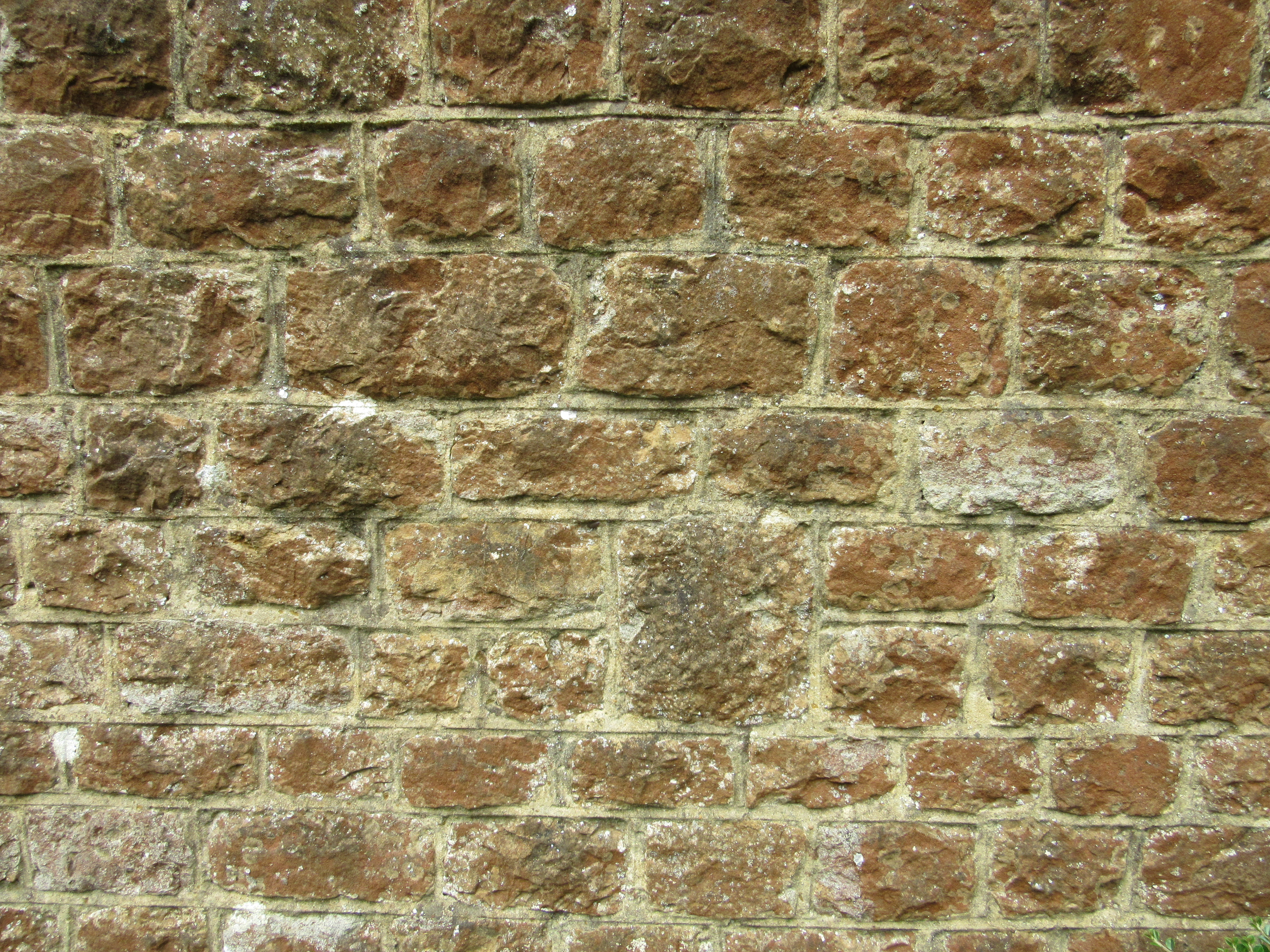
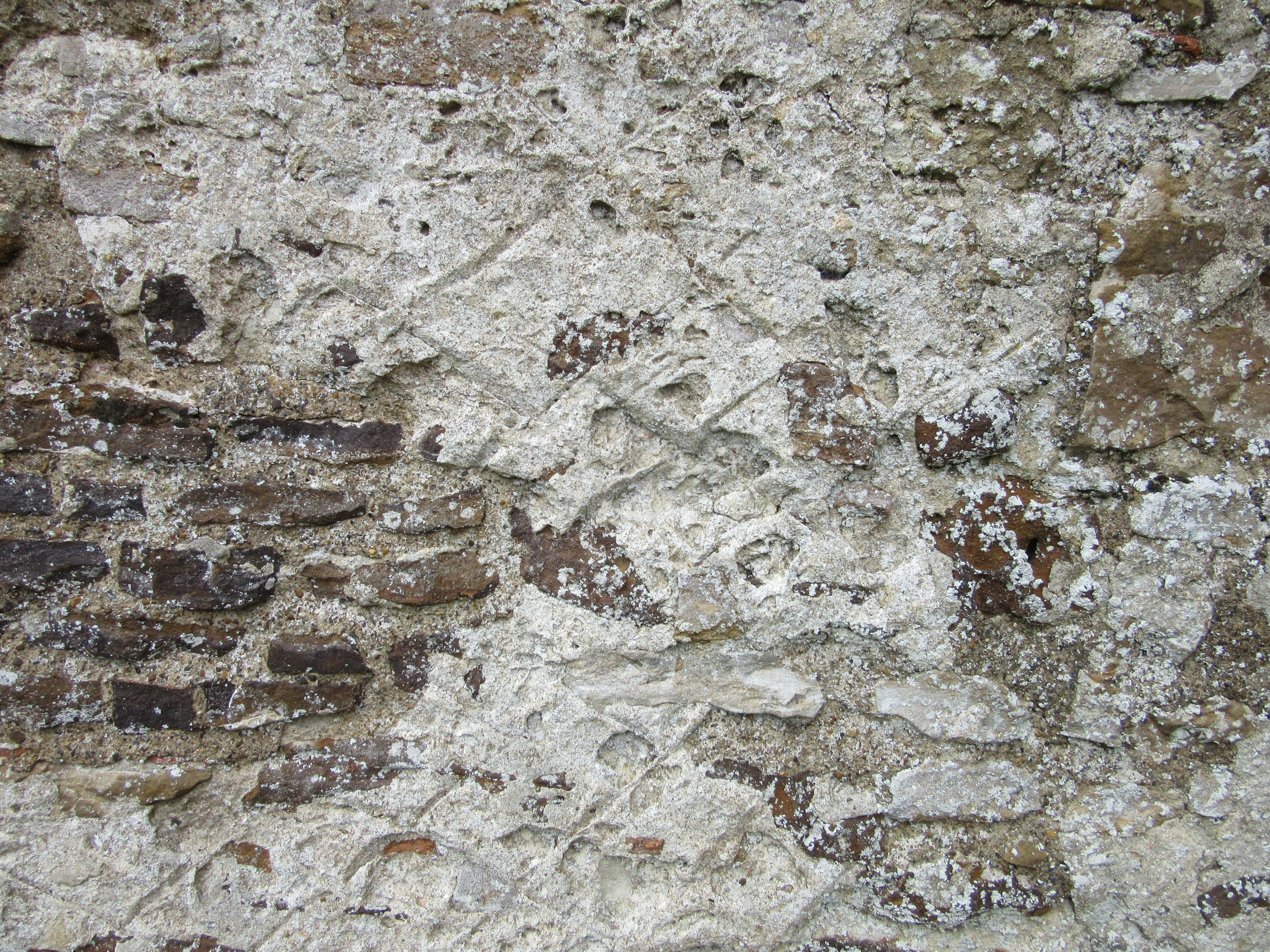
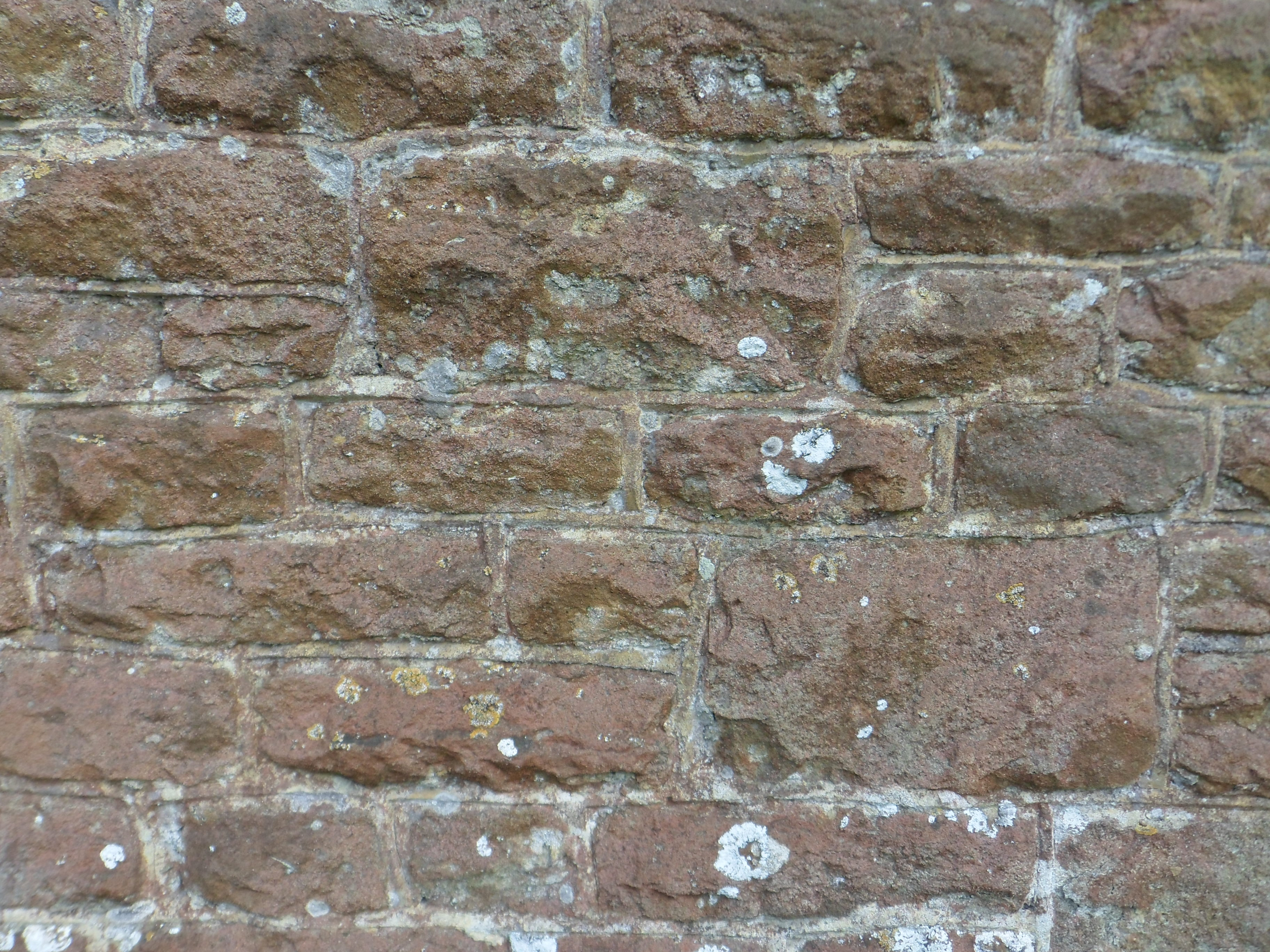
Examples of stonework at the parish churches of Churt, Frensham and Chiddingfold (left to right).

Although "at least two-thirds of Surrey's old churches are faced with flint", stone was much more commonly used in the southwestern parts of Surrey which are now covered by Waverley district. A geological division runs right through Waverley from west to east, entering the county at Hale and continuing along the line of the Hog's Back towards and beyond Guildford. The sandy London Basin to the north yielded almost no usable stone, but to the south the Lower Greensand of the Early Cretaceous period offered much stone for medieval builders to work with. Bargate stone—a coarse, light-brown sandstone—was historically quarried around Chilworth, Guildford and Godalming, and was still being used for new buildings until the late 19th century and beyond. Churches built with it in the medieval period include Alfold, Bramley, Chiddingfold and Dunsfold; and among the 19th- and early-20th-century churches which used it are Busbridge, Grayswood and Hambledon, St Edmund's Catholic Church in Godalming and the Congregational chapels at Elstead (now United Reformed) and Milford (now Baptist). Chalk was quarried extensively in the east and north of Surrey, and some churches use it internally—an example is Alfold. "Irregular veins" of carrstone also occur locally in the Lower Greensand, particularly between Tilford and Albury (near Chilworth). It was used alongside Bargate stone at Cranleigh and Tilford churches among others. Wooden towers and bell-cots are a characteristic feature of Surrey's old churches, but in this part of Surrey only Dunsfold has one—although Hambledon's 19th-century church, designed in keeping with the Surrey vernacular, was given one. Medieval timber porches are more common, occurring at churches including Alfold, Elstead and Thursley. Nonconformist chapels, from the early-18th-century Godalming Friends Meeting House to buildings of the late 19th century, are overwhelmingly brick-built (with stone being used in later chapels), but Hale Methodist Church (1880) is mostly of flint.

== Religious affiliation ==
According to the 2011 United Kingdom census, 121,572 people lived in the borough of Waverley. Of these, 65.2% identified themselves as Christian, 0.6% were Muslim, 0.3% were Hindu, 0.4% were Buddhist, 0.2% were Jewish, 0.1% were Sikh, 0.4% followed another religion, 25.3% claimed no religious affiliation and 7.6% did not state their religion. The proportion of Christians was significantly higher than the 59.8% recorded in England as a whole, and the proportion of Waverley residents not stating their religion was also slightly higher than the national figure of 7.4%. Hinduism, Islam, Sikhism and other religions all had lower proportions of adherents than England as a whole; the proportion of people with no religious affiliation was also lower (the national figure was 27.7%); and the proportion of Jews was in line with the national figure.

== Administration ==
=== Anglican churches ===
The Diocese of Guildford administers all of the borough's Anglican churches. Its seat is Guildford Cathedral. The churches are grouped geographically into deaneries. These lie within one of two Archdeaconries—Dorking Archdeaconry and Surrey Archdeaconry—which are an intermediate administrative level between the diocese and the deaneries. All of Waverley's churches are part of the Surrey Archdeaconry and are in one of three deaneries: Cranleigh, Farnham or Godalming. Cranleigh Deanery covers the churches in Alfold, Blackheath Village, Bramley, Cranleigh, Dunsfold, Ewhurst, Grafham, Hascombe, Shamley Green and Wonersh. The churches at Busbridge, Chiddingfold, Elstead, Farncombe, Godalming, Grayswood, Hambledon, Haslemere (St Bartholomew's and St Christopher's), Milford, Ockford Ridge, Peper Harow, Shottermill, Thursley and Witley are part of Godalming Deanery. Farnham Deanery is responsible for the churches at Badshot Lea, Churt, Dockenfield, Frensham, Hale, Heath End, Hindhead, Tilford and Wrecclesham, and for all the churches in Farnham town: those at Byworth, Compton, Lower Bourne and Middle Bourne, and St Andrew's Church in the town centre.

=== Roman Catholic churches ===
All Roman Catholic churches in Waverley are administered by Guildford Deanery, one of 13 deaneries in the Roman Catholic Diocese of Arundel and Brighton, whose cathedral is at Arundel in West Sussex. The churches are at Farnham; Heath End; Haslemere, Hindhead (Beacon Hill) and Chiddingfold (part of a joint parish); Bramley and Cranleigh (also in a joint parish); and Godalming and Milford, whose joint parish also includes the Anglican church at Farncombe at which a weekly Catholic Mass is held. In addition, St Augustine's Abbey, Chilworth www.chilworthbenedictines.com, just outside Guildford is an order of Roman Catholic monks following the Order of St Benedict (Subiaco Cassinese Congregation). Whilst not a parish, the Abbey is open to the public 365 days a year for daily Masses and Divine Office plus study days, courses and monastic vocations.

=== Other denominations ===
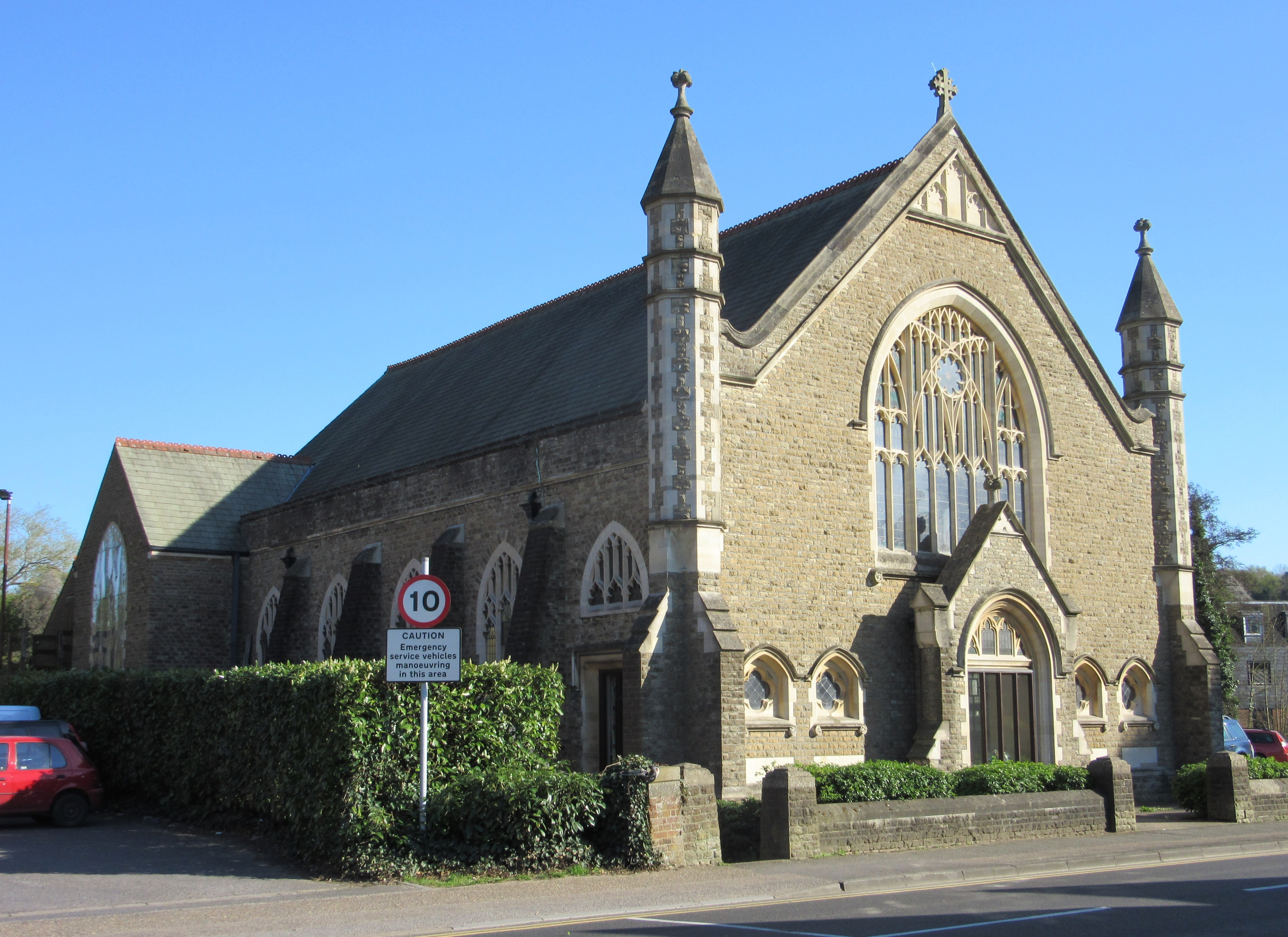
Godalming United Church is part of both the Guildford Methodist Circuit and the Wessex Synod of the United Reformed Church.

The six-church Guildford Methodist Circuit administers Cranleigh Methodist Church and Godalming United Church, a shared Methodist and United Reformed church. Farnham, Hale and Rowledge's Methodist churches are in the Hants–Surrey Border Circuit. Haslemere Methodist Church is within the East Solent and Downs Methodist Circuit. Godalming United Church is also within the Wessex Synod of the United Reformed Church's 13-synod national structure, as are the United Reformed churches at Beacon Hill, Elstead and Wonersh. (Note: The United Reformed Church denomination was formed from the amalgamation of the Congregational Church and the Presbyterian Church of England in 1972.)

The Baptist churches at Chiddingfold, Dunsfold, Ewhurst, Farnham, Godalming and Milford are part of the Guildford Network of the South Eastern Baptist Association. Bethel Baptist Chapel in Hale maintains links with GraceNet UK, an association of Reformed Evangelical Christian churches and organisations.

Alfold Chapel, Binscombe Church and the Emmanuel Free Church in Farnham are members of two Evangelical groups: the Fellowship of Independent Evangelical Churches (FIEC), a pastoral and administrative network of about 500 churches with an evangelical outlook, and Affinity (formerly the British Evangelical Council), a network of conservative Evangelical congregations throughout Great Britain.

== Listed status ==
Grade	Criteria
Grade I	Buildings of exceptional interest, sometimes considered to be internationally important.
Grade II*	Particularly important buildings of more than special interest.
Grade II	Buildings of national importance and special interest.

== Current places of worship ==
Current places of worship
Name	Image	Location	Denomination/ Affiliation	Grade	Notes	Refs
St Nicholas' Church (More images)		Alfold; 51.095714°N 0.520247°W	Anglican	I	Much of the building is 12th-century, but the north aisle is a century newer and restoration was carried out in 1845. The "heavy Wealden exterior" is accentuated by the large Horsham Stone roof and the use of local building materials (Bargate stone and chalk). A 14th-century timber porch survives in original condition on the south side. Surrounded by old trees and standing on raised ground, the setting is "delightfully picturesque". Inside is an ancient Norman font.	
Alfold Chapel		Alfold; 51.09647°N 0.517108°W	Evangelical	–	This was built in 1883 and was registered as a Baptist chapel. It is now aligned to the FIEC Evangelical movement and offers two services every Sunday.	
St George's Church (More images)		Badshot Lea; 51.230292°N 0.762358°W	Anglican	–	This church, part of the three-church Anglican parish of Badshot Lea and Hale, was founded on 23 August 1902 and completed a year later. The Bishop of Winchester, under whose jurisdiction it came at the time, consecrated the building on 24 October 1903.	
St Anselm's Church (More images)		Beacon Hill; 51.122688°N 0.755838°W	Roman Catholic	–	The Catholic church here has its roots in a private chapel of 1934 in the grounds of Hale House in the neighbouring village of Churt. The Hunt family, who had converted the building into a chapel, opened it for public worship three years later. In 1950, weekly Masses moved to another house in Hindhead and the parish of Haslemere paid £700 for land for a permanent church. This was registered for worship in May 1953 and for marriages in January 1955.	
Beacon Hill United Reformed Church (More images)		Beacon Hill; 51.122058°N 0.752987°W	United Reformed	–	This was the third of three Congregational chapels built in the Hindhead and Haslemere areas at the expense of John Grover. Completed in 1905 and registered for marriages in December 1913, it is a red-brick building with exterior rendering and a timber-framed gable. The façade has prominent buttresses. As originally built, the church included a schoolroom, working men's club, kitchen and vestry.	
Binscombe Church (More images)		Binscombe; 51.202326°N 0.61199°W	Evangelical	–	A member of Godalming Baptist Church who lived in Binscombe, a postwar housing estate, started house meetings in 1957. Meanwhile, land had been reserved for a place of worship, and at a meeting in 1961 support was given to build a church. Deeds were signed in 1964, construction started early that year and continued until 1965. It opened in March of that year, and under the name Binscombe Evangelical Church it was registered for marriages in August 1965.	
St Martin's Church (More images)		Blackheath Village; 51.205757°N 0.525255°W	Anglican	II	Charles Harrison Townsend, the Arts and Crafts movement-influenced architect of the Whitechapel Gallery and Horniman Museum in London, designed this "queer little building" in 1893–95 in a style which has been described as "Spanish mission [chapel]", "Italian Gothic or Romanesque". The interior is decorated with ceiling frescoes and marblework, while the exterior has plain cement and brickwork, a tiled roof and a small rounded bell-cot.	
St Augustine's Abbey (More images)		Blackheath Village; 51.208886°N 0.525466°W	Roman Catholic	II	Frederick Walters designed a Franciscan friary and chapel in 1892 in a rural location between Chilworth and Blackheath Village. The chapel was used as a Catholic parish church (the Church of the Holy Ghost, also known as the Greyfriars Church) from 1945. The Franciscan friars moved out in 2011 and the parish of the Holy Ghost was dissolved on 2 January of that year; but under its new name of St Augustine's Abbey, public Masses and Divine Office are held in the Abbey Church. The abbey now houses Benedictines from the Order of St Benedict (Subiaco Cassinese Congregation) who moved from an abbey in Ramsgate. Architecturally, the "soberly and honestly detailed" chapel of local (Ewhurst) stone, which is linked to the living accommodation, is Gothic Revival/Renaissance Revival in style.	
Holy Trinity Church (More images)		Bramley; 51.194489°N 0.557702°W	Anglican	II*	Henry Woodyer's restoration of 1875–76 and an earlier extension of 1850 (which added the north aisle) partly obscure the 12th- and 13th-century origins of this village church. The chancel is entirely of the 13th century, and a Norman archway with zigzag moulding which was originally in a porch at the west end has been reset above 19th-century jambs. The building is mostly of Bargate stone, partly re-roofed in slate in the 19th century. There is a tower with a shingled spire.	
Church of St Thomas More (More images)		Bramley; 51.193295°N 0.556604°W	Roman Catholic	–	This stands near Holy Trinity Church on the High Street and was built in 1958–59 to a design by R.C. Hosford. It was registered for worship in December 1958 and for marriages in September 1961. A modern triptych designed by D. O'Connell is found inside.	
St John the Baptist's Church (More images)		Busbridge; 51.177072°N 0.601507°W	Anglican	II*	George Gilbert Scott's Bargate stone Early English Gothic Revival church in this part of Godalming parish was built between 1865 and 1867 and was consecrated in the latter year. There is high-quality stained glass by Morris & Co. dating from between 1899 and 1905, including some specifically attributed to Edward Burne-Jones. Edwin Lutyens designed a "fine, decorative wrought-iron screen" in 1897; described by Nikolaus Pevsner as "mysterious and moving", it was made in 1899 by the firm of J. Starkie Gardner. Lutyens also designed some marblework below the screen and, in 1920, a war memorial in the raised churchyard.	
St Mary's Church (More images)		Chiddingfold; 51.109821°N 0.630037°W	Anglican	I	Only the chancel, with its "striking [and] impressive composition of lancets" on the south side, remains from the 13th-century church (which was itself a replacement for a pre-Norman church). Henry Woodyer's restoration of 1869 greatly widened the north aisle of the nave and removed much of the old fabric. Bargate stone walls and an interior built mostly of clunch characterise the church, which stands on high ground in the village centre. There are eight bells in the tower, which was heightened by 12 feet (3.7 m) during Woodyer's alterations.	
Chiddingfold Baptist Church (More images)		Chiddingfold; 51.114764°N 0.633823°W	Baptist	–	This church was originally registered for worship under the name Woodside Baptist Chapel. Samuel Barrow of nearby Buntingford Hall, who founded Dunsfold Baptist Church and others in Surrey, also helped this church. In the 19th century, meetings took place at a house in Ramsnest Common, then in a timber barn nearby. The present site in Chiddingfold village was bought in 1904, Barrow donated the bricks, and the old chapel was dismantled and its timber used in the new chapel's construction as well. Guildford Baptist Church looked after it for many years.	
St Teresa of Avila's Church (More images)		Chiddingfold; 51.114481°N 0.628048°W	Roman Catholic	–	Chiddingfold's Catholic church dates from 1959 and was registered for worship in October of that year, although a marriage licence was not granted until April 1961. It is an expensively built neo-Norman structure of yellow stone, cruciform in shape with a large apse. It has been described as "the best example" of prolific ecclesiastical architect Henry Bingham Towner's postwar churches, whose "asymmetric but carefully balanced design" on a prominent corner plot complements the vernacular buildings of the ancient village.	
St John the Evangelist's Church (More images)		Churt; 51.139651°N 0.781257°W	Anglican	–	"Nicely sited" away from the main road across a green, this small stone church dates from 1868 and was designed by Ewan Christian. Although Decorated Gothic Revival in style, it also has elements of the Surrey Vernacular.	
St Nicholas' Church (More images)		Cranleigh; 51.141718°N 0.486340°W	Anglican	II*	This mostly 12th-century church uses many different types of stone, but some is obscured by plasterwork on the outside. The 14th-century tower is tall and massive, particularly in its buttressing. The nave has north and south aisles, and the adjacent north and south transepts each have side chapels (the Vachery Chapel and Knoll Chapel respectively). Its "heavy solid Wealden character" and Decorated Gothic style makes it resemble a West Sussex church. William Butterfield undertook some restoration in 1845, a vestry and porch were added in the 1860s, and the churchyard was extended in 1880 (when Henry Woodyer designed a large lychgate).	
Cranleigh Baptist Church (More images)		Cranleigh; 51.142922°N 0.495425°W	Baptist	–	The new Baptist chapel facing Cranleigh Common, which at one time incorporated a school, replaced the earlier chapel nearby in 1889 and was registered for marriages in February 1893. At first it followed the principles of Strict Baptist doctrine, but by 1950 a General Baptist character had been adopted. Growth in the late 20th century led to the church moving to Glebelands School between 1998 and 2007, when a new larger building (pictured) adjacent to the 1889 chapel (click for picture) was completed.	
Cranleigh Methodist Church (More images)		Cranleigh; 51.142251°N 0.493261°W	Methodist	–	A "small Wesleyan mission church on the common" was recorded in the Victoria County History of Surrey in 1911. The present building dates from 1904 and was built for £2,400. Previously the congregation had used a smaller hall which became inadequate.	
Church of Jesus Christ Redeemer of Mankind (More images)		Cranleigh; 51.142244°N 0.48221°W	Roman Catholic	–	Cranleigh's first Catholic church had a similar dedication (to The Most Holy Redeemer) and was registered for marriages in May 1935. The present church replaced it and was registered in its place in September 1963.	
Church of the Good Shepherd (More images)		Dockenfield; 51.158579°N 0.821942°W	Anglican	–	William Curtis Green designed this small church in 1910 for this tiny, scattered settlement on the Hampshire border. "Very domestic and carefully textured", it is a plain building of Bargate stone and brick; the stonework is galleted.	
St Mary and All Saints Church (More images)		Dunsfold; 51.117717°N 0.575110°W	Anglican	I	Standing distant from the village in a remote hilltop situation, this large church was begun in the 1270s and completed within 20 years and has seen minimal alteration since. Like many local churches it is cruciform and uses Bargate stone extensively. There is no tower, but a wooden bell-cot is topped with a shingled pyramidal spire. The Crown owned land around here in the 13th century and held the advowson of the church; "royal masons" may have designed and built the church.	
Dunsfold Baptist Church (More images)		Dunsfold; 51.115968°N 0.561724°W	Baptist	–	Samuel Barrow jp provided the village with a Baptist chapel in 1883. The present building was erected in the late 20th century on the site of the village reading room, which was used as a chapel for a time: under the name Dunsfold Free Church it was registered in June 1975 in place of the original chapel. Although originally registered with the name "Free Church", it was always Baptist in character.	
St James's Church (More images)		Elstead; 51.182722°N 0.709017°W	Anglican	II*	An architect called Garling remodelled Elstead's parish church in 1871, but a little medieval fabric remains: some lancet windows of the 13th to 15th centuries and a "humble 15th-century timber porch". The white weatherboarded belfry at the west end is topped with a shingled spire. Many of the internal fittings and much of the stained glass date from the 19th century.	
Elstead United Reformed Church (More images)		Elstead; 51.184281°N 0.70007°W	United Reformed	II	The Congregational cause in this village developed in 1821 when a pastor from Farnham held services at nearby Tilford. Later that year a chapel was built in Elstead itself for £240, but in 1845 land was bought for a larger building and it was opened in the following year and was registered for marriages with the name Independent Chapel in December 1854. It is a Classical-style Bargate stone and brick building with a pediment supported by pilasters which separate the tall arched windows. Inside is a wood-panelled gallery reached by a timber staircase. In the late 20th century it was a joint Methodist and United Reformed church, but now it is solely used by a United Reformed congregation.	
St Peter and St Paul's Church (More images)		Ewhurst; 51.153091°N 0.440941°W	Anglican	I	Architect Robert Ebbels, an "almost unknown provincial practitioner", rebuilt the tower at this large sandstone church after the previous one collapsed in 1838, also wrecking the chancel. The new tower, centrally placed in the cruciform plan and in a heavy Norman style, gives the church much of its character in the view of Nikolaus Pevsner. Much of the 12th-century original Norman fabric remains, including a Norman doorway with large capitals and roll moulding around the arch.	
Ewhurst Baptist Church		Ewhurst; 51.155299°N 0.442661°W	Baptist	–	The Surrey Congregational Mission founded a chapel for that denomination in July 1821. The cause prospered and £100 was spent on renovation work in the late 1890s. A new chapel was then built in 1908, but it closed in 1958 and was bought by an FIEC-aligned Evangelical group for £3,000. Its new occupants reregistered it in November 1960. Steps towards becoming a Baptist church started in 1997 and concluded seven years later when the present name was adopted. As a Congregational chapel it was registered for marriages in May 1910; it was re-registered under its new guise as Ewhurst Evangelical Church in July 1961.	
St John the Evangelist's Church (More images)		Farncombe; 51.195784°N 0.603595°W	Anglican	–	This Victorian suburban village attached to Godalming has its own parish church, dating originally from 1847 (but consecrated two years later) and added to in 1860, 1875 and 1881. The latest work was by C. F. Hayward, but George Gilbert Scott or the colleagues in his practice were responsible for the rest of the building, which is a Bargate stone church in the Early English Gothic Revival style.	
St Andrew's Church (More images)		Farnham; 51.213185°N 0.80071°W	Anglican	I	The "handsome" massive west tower dominates this large 12th-century church in the middle of the town. Fragments of a Saxon predecessor were found in the churchyard in the early 21st century, when the church was also upgraded to Grade I listed status. Initially there was a chancel with side chapels and a nave, which was reconstructed in the 15th century; an aisle was added at this time as well; the chancel had been lengthened a century before; and the tower dates from the 16th century. Much restoration and rebuilding was carried out in the 19th century (particularly by Benjamin Ferrey in 1855), in 1959 by David Evelyn Nye and in the early 21st century.	
St Francis' Church (More images)		Farnham; 51.21505°N 0.8157°W	Anglican	–	This church, situated in Byworth in the northwest of Farnham, is part of Farnham parish together with St Andrew's Church in the town centre. There are services on three Sundays of each month.	
Brambleton Hall (More images)		Farnham; 51.204148°N 0.803048°W	Anglican	–	This combined community hall and church was built by people from the parish and is one of three churches in the parish of The Bourne, with St Thomas-on-the-Bourne and St Martin-on-the-Green. There are weekly Sunday services.	
The Wey Church (More images)		Farnham; 51.21019°N 0.801272°W	Assemblies of God	–	Pentecostal Christians have been meeting in Farnham since 1954. A church on the present site in Red Lion Lane was registered for worship and marriages in August 1965, but the current building dates from 1993. Originally known as Farnham Pentecostal Full Gospel Church, it took its present name by 2019.	
Farnham Baptist Church (More images)		Farnham; 51.21631°N 0.803843°W	Baptist	–	The church was founded in 1960 and has occupied premises on The Hart in the town centre since 1975. Its registration as a place of worship dates from June 1976. The church supports a daughter church which meets at Wrecclesham Community Centre.	
First Church of Christ, Scientist, Farnham (More images)		Farnham; 51.216466°N 0.79895°W	Christian Scientist	–	A building in West Street was registered as a place of worship for the Farnham Christian Science Society between July 1936 and May 1956. Premises on East Street succeeded it, but the present church on Bear Lane replaced it in turn in November 1964.	
Emmanuel Church (More images)		Farnham; 51.213144°N 0.794691°W	Evangelical	–	Founded in the late 19th century as an independent church (Emmanuel Episcopalian Mission), this church was later aligned with the Reformed Episcopal movement (for which it was registered for marriages in July 1911), the Free Church of England and the unconnected Evangelical Connexion of the Free Church of England. It is now an FIEC-aligned independent Evangelical congregation. The red-brick building dates from 1900 and superseded a tin tabernacle of 1889, which itself replaced an earlier iron chapel.	
Jubilee Church Farnham		Farnham; 51.204949°N 0.800213°W	Evangelical	–	Weydon Hall was registered in November 1964 but ceased to be used by its original congregation and was deregistered in September 1995. It was reregistered as Weydon Christian Centre at that time. In 2002, Jubilee Church began as a house church aligned with the Newfrontiers Evangelical movement, and subsequently services and other activities were moved to the former Weydon Hall building and to Weydon School.	
The Spire Church (Farnham Methodist Church) (More images)		Farnham; 51.214292°N 0.795469°W	Methodist and United Reformed Church	–	The church was built on land adjacent to the road from Farnham town centre to railway station, newly constructed in the 1870s. It opened in 1875 and was registered for marriages three years later. Leslie Weatherhead, later to become famous as a theological writer and president of the Methodist Conference in the 1950s, had his first ministerial appointment here from 1915. Farnham Methodist Church and Farnham United Reformed Church united as a Local ecumenical partnership with effect from 2 September 2018, but worship continues at both sites.	
The Spire Church (Farnham United Reformed Church) (More images)		Farnham; 51.214456°N 0.796525°W	Methodist and United Reformed Church	II	There was a Presbyterian meeting house in Farnham from c. 1660. It declined by the late 18th century, and the remaining congregation joined Ebenezer Independent Chapel when it opened on East Street on 16 October 1793—despite much opposition from local people who did not wish to have Nonconformists in the town. The present much larger church was built on South Street in 1872–73 after several wealthy men from Farnham and Godalming pledged money. The site was bought on 22 October 1872 and the first service was held on 16 July 1873. Twelve days later Farnham Congregational Church was registered for marriages in place of Ebenezer Chapel, which was thereafter disused. The church (now United Reformed) is a Gothic Revival building of ashlar with Decorated Gothic-style lancet windows and a tower with a tall spire. Farnham Methodist Church and Farnham United Reformed Church united as a Local ecumenical partnership with effect from 2 September 2018, but worship continues at both sites. A project to improve the building was granted permission in December 2019.	
Brethren Meeting Room (More images)		Farnham; 51.209802°N 0.813040°W	Plymouth Brethren Christian Church	–	Brethren who had previously used a meeting hall on the other side of West Street registered this former telephone exchange as a replacement place of worship in 2018 after selling the old hall for redevelopment.	
Friends Meeting Room		Farnham; 51.209661°N 0.789618°W	Quaker	–	A 17th/18th-century Quaker cause in Farnham died out c. 1712 and the meeting house does not survive. The present meeting room, registered in May 1947, succeeds an earlier one in another part of Farnham which was registered for worship between 1944 and 1947. In 1945 the Quaker community paid £1,925 for a semi-detached house which they converted to form a first-floor flat and a ground-floor meeting room. Alterations were made in 1965 and 1991. The congregation is one of five "local meetings" in the Surrey–Hampshire Border Area, along with those at Farnborough, Guildford, Godalming and Woking.	
St Joan of Arc's Church (More images)		Farnham; 51.211059°N 0.789195°W	Roman Catholic	II	J.E. Dixon-Spain's Neo-Georgian/Romanesque Revival church of 1929–30 was one of only a small number he built: schools, cinemas and film studios were his principal commissions. Distinctive for its tall campanile and steep roof, it uses brick, concrete and Portland stone and has a "sharply cubic" effect accentuated by its formally laid out grounds. The church was registered for marriages in June 1930, replacing an earlier church dedicated to St Polycarp.	
Farnham Vineyard Church (More images)		Farnham; 51.213694°N 0.796775°W	Vineyard Churches	II	This originated as a church plant in 1991, associated with the Vineyard Movement which had been founded in the 1970s. In April 2013, Sunday worship moved to the newly named Vineyard Centre. Originally called Church House, this was built in 1909 as a church hall for St Andrew's Church. The Arts and Crafts-inspired design was by R.B. Preston.	
St Mary the Virgin's Church (More images)		Frensham; 51.166056°N 0.797272°W	Anglican	II*	The large sandstone church, principally 13th-century but with a 14th-century tower with gigantic brick buttresses at the corners, experienced two restorations: one in 1868 by J.M.K. Hähn and another by William Caröe. Hähn's work was Decorated Gothic Revival in style but with one arcade in the Early English Gothic Revival style.	
Frensham Baptist Fellowship		Frensham; 51.173278°N 0.788497°W	Evangelical	–	This church belongs to the Evangelical Alliance and is based at Marindin Hall at Millbridge in Frensham parish.	
Pierrepont House (Ellel Ministries International)		Frensham; 51.172018°N 0.78237°W	Non-denominational	II*	Pierrepont House, a "formidable ... house by Norman Shaw" built in 1876 northeast of Frensham village, is now occupied by Ellel Ministries International, a non-denominational Christian organisation which offers spiritual healing and training in Christian ministry. Part of the house, which stands on private land (entrance lodge and sign pictured), has been registered for worship and for the solemnisation of marriages, the latter since September 2006.	
St Peter and St Paul's Church (More images)		Godalming; 51.187047°N 0.616144°W	Anglican	I	There is work of many periods in this "slow-growth medieval church" which dominates the streetscape in Godalming town centre. Two blocked windows survive from the pre-Norman building, and some 11th-century fabric remains in the eastern part of the nave. Otherwise much of the structure dates from between the 12th and 14th centuries and was subject to Victorian restoration. The overall style is Decorated Gothic, but some of the windows are in the later Perpendicular Gothic style. The walls are of Bargate stone with some clunch and Bath stone, and the lead-covered spire is uncommon in this part of England.	
Godalming Baptist Church		Godalming; 51.185281°N 0.610718°W	Baptist	–	The present church is a modern building, but Godalming's first permanent Baptist chapel (Gothic Revival and with a stone façade) was built in 1903 on the same site in Queen Street. A hall was built behind it in the 1930s. The Pioneer Mission and Guildford Baptist Church founded the cause in the late 19th century; meetings took place in a house and then hall before the 200-capacity church was built.	
First Church of Christ, Scientist, Godalming		Godalming; 51.184400°N 0.617908°W	Christian Scientist	–	An earlier Christian Science meeting room was registered on South Street between 1930 and 1936, when a new church replaced it. The site on which it stood was redeveloped with a care home between 2015 and 2018, and the present church was built next to it as part of the scheme.	
Kingdom Hall (More images)		Godalming; 51.183797°N 0.610659°W	Jehovah's Witnesses	–	This Kingdom Hall on Carlos Street is used by the Godalming Congregation of Jehovah's Witnesses. It was registered for worship in November 1963 and for marriages in January 1970. An earlier Kingdom Hall occupied part of a building on Meadrow and had been registered in 1942.	
Godalming United Church (More images)		Godalming; 51.188392°N 0.607783°W	Methodist and United Reformed Church	–	The building dates from 1903 and was originally a Wesleyan chapel. Under the name Hugh Price Hughes Memorial Chapel it was registered for marriages in July 1904. Meanwhile, after nearly 250 years of worshipping separately (Congregationalists had their first chapel in the town in 1730), the Congregational church's successor denomination the United Reformed Church vacated its chapel and in 1977 and joined this church, which was officially reconstituted as a United church.	
Friends Meeting House (More images)		Godalming; 51.185303°N 0.617744°W	Quaker	II	A conventicle met at Eashing from the mid-17th century, and a meeting house was opened in Godalming town a few years after 1698, when Caleb Woods bought an old mill and associated buildings. A new building was erected in 1748, and it has been in use since then as a Quaker place of worship—albeit with a 60-year break when the congregation declined to unsustainable levels. The simple brick and tile building was leased to Plymouth Brethren for some of that time. The Quaker community moved back in during 1926.	
St Edmund King and Martyr's Church (More images)		Godalming; 51.183728°N 0.615395°W	Roman Catholic	II	Godalming, a strongly Protestant Nonconformist town, was late to gain a Catholic church: a man from nearby Bowlhead Green bought land and a tin tabernacle to put on it in 1899, and this became the parish hall when the present Bargate stone Gothic Revival church was built in 1905–06 to the design of Frederick Walters and was registered for marriages in January 1908. It stands on a "dramatically sloping hillside site" high above the town. The interior, originally very austere, has been augmented by Hardman & Co. stained glass, an ornate Lady chapel and an elaborate High altar.	
Meadrow Unitarian Chapel (More images)		Godalming; 51.193522°N 0.597792°W	Unitarian	II	Hundreds of General Baptists met at a conventicle at the house of William Evershed (founder of Billingshurst Unitarian Chapel) in the mid-18th century, and in 1783 the decision was taken to build a chapel. This was achieved in 1789, and there has been a continuous history of worship since then at the plain single-storey arched-windowed brick building. By the early 19th century, though, the congregation's views had moved towards Unitarianism, and the chapel maintains a Unitarian identity into the 21st century.	
St Andrew's Church (More images)		Grafham; 51.165041°N 0.538353°W	Anglican	II*	Architect Henry Woodyer, who restored many churches in Surrey in the Victorian era, lived nearby at Grafham Grange and designed and funded this small chapel in Bramley parish (he is also buried in the churchyard). It dates from 1861 to 1864 and is of sandstone with some brick decoration and a wooden porch. The chancel has an apse.	
All Saints Church (More images)		Grayswood; 51.104941°N 0.691502°W	Anglican	II	Originally in Witley parish, this chapel of ease was designed by Swedish architect Axel Haig (who worked under Ewan Christian) in 1900–02. He is buried in the churchyard, his grave marked by a large stone with a ship design. Its style mixes Surrey Vernacular, Decorated Gothic Revival and Arts and Crafts elements. Alfred Harman of Grayswood Place paid most of the £4,750 cost. The main material is Bargate stone.	
St John the Evangelist's Church (More images)		Hale; 51.228006°N 0.785299°W	Anglican	II	A new church by designed by Benjamin Ferrey in 1844 for this suburbanised village, this is not in his characteristic Gothic Revival style but has a "wild neo-Romanesque"/neo-Norman appearance. The church was founded by Bishop of Winchester Charles Sumner, who is commemorated by a monument inside. The church was extended to Ferrey's design in 1861 and again later. The walls are of clunch and sandstone, and there is an unusual four-stage circular tower.	
Bethel Baptist Church (More images)		Hale; 51.234334°N 0.790667°W	Baptist	–	The church has grown continuously since the original chapel nearby was built in 1834. The present chapel of the early 21st century was erected alongside the Sunday school hall and is also used as a church hall. The old chapel, which still stands, was registered for marriages in April 1928.	
Hale Methodist Church (More images)		Hale; 51.233484°N 0.794792°W	Methodist	II	Known locally as The Church on the Green, this chapel was built for Wesleyan Methodists in the late 19th century: it was opened in 1880 and registered for marriages ten years later. The main building material is flint, but the quoins and dressings are of red brick and the roof is tiled. Each of the four bays in the body of the church is lit by a round-arched window and demarcated by a brick and flint buttress. The entrance is in an offset gabled porch. At the north end, three tall arched windows are set in a wide arched recess decorated with herringbone brickwork.	
St Peter's Church (More images)		Hambledon; 51.142108°N 0.614286°W	Anglican	II	Nothing survives of the original church in this thinly populated parish; the present building dates from 1846, although it uses traditional local materials (Bargate stone dressed with ashlar) and is in a local Surrey style. The nave has one aisle and attached vestry, and there is an entrance porch and a timber belfry with a small pyramidal cap. The old church, described in 1824, had only a nave and chancel with a manorial chapel. The design of the font was copied from Holy Trinity Church, Bosham, and also resembles that at nearby Alfold.	
St Peter's Church (More images)		Hascombe; 51.146385°N 0.569180°W	Anglican	II*	Regarded by Nikolaus Pevsner as one of Surrey's best Victorian churches and one of the best by Henry Woodyer, this Bargate stone building was designed in 1864 and was "thoroughly finished in every detail". An apsidal chancel leads through to the nave and south chapel (under its own roofline and with diagonal buttresses), and there is a short tower, south porch and north vestry. The original interior decoration has also been preserved.	
St Bartholomew's Church (More images)		Haslemere; 51.093008°N 0.711831°W	Anglican	II	Haslemere's parish church was a chapel of ease to Chiddingfold for many years. It is of Early English Gothic appearance, but only the tower is of the 13th century—local architect John Penfold redesigned and rebuilt the rest of the church between July 1870 and July 1871. An earlier rebuild in 1837 had already changed the appearance of the nave and chancel. Alfred, Lord Tennyson, who lived at Aldworth House nearby, is commemorated by a stained glass window designed by Edward Burne-Jones, and there is much other stained glass of the Victorian era.	
St Christopher's Church (More images)		Haslemere; 51.088742°N 0.726271°W	Anglican	II	A tin tabernacle on King's Road served Anglicans in the central and western parts of Haslemere for some years until this church was built at a cost of £4,200 (£5,000 including the land) on Lion Green. Work took place between 1902 and 1904 and it was consecrated in 1903. Architect Charles Spooner was involved, and the style has been described as "Free Late Gothic". Several different types of stone were used in construction, including ironstone which was used for galleting. A side chapel was added in 1935.	
Kingdom Hall		Haslemere; 51.088215°N 0.729137°W	Jehovah's Witnesses	–	This Kingdom Hall on Wey Hill is used by the Haslemere Congregation of Jehovah's Witnesses. It was registered for marriages in June 1971, although its worship registration was granted in October 1943.	
Haslemere Methodist Church (More images)		Haslemere; 51.087526°N 0.732586°W	Methodist	–	Formalised Methodist worship in Haslemere started in the 1880s when services were held at a hotel, then later in another hired room. A tin tabernacle was erected near a house in Longdene Road in February 1896, and on 8 October 1900 the foundation stone of Haslemere's first permanent Methodist church was laid at a ceremony attended by Hugh Price Hughes. The church cost £1,200 (exclusive of £100 to buy the land on King's Road), and the building was used until the present church opened in March 1972 on Lion Green. This site had been bought in 1947. The old church passed into the ownership of the Three Counties Church, an Evangelical group.	
Church of Our Lady of Lourdes (More images)		Haslemere; 51.089871°N 0.720793°W	Roman Catholic	–	Mass was celebrated at Haslemere from 1908, when Franciscan friars from Chilworth Friary used a room in a hotel. Construction work on a permanent church began in 1923, and it was complete in August 1924. Its registration for marriages and consecration followed in October 1925 and 1932 respectively. The Early English Gothic Revival church was designed by Frederick Walters and has a particularly high chancel and sanctuary in relation to the nave.	
Christ the King Church		Haslemere; 51.090639°N 0.737329°W	Roman Catholic	–	The hospital (part of building pictured) was built as a tuberculosis sanatorium in 1917 and was run by the Daughters of the Cross, a Roman Catholic religious institute. Its chapel is registered for public worship and has been registered for worship and marriages since 1981. It is administered as part of the parish of Haslemere.	
Hope Chapel (More images)		Haslemere; 51.088247°N 0.711236°W	Baptist	–	A man from Shottermill founded a Congregational chapel in Haslemere after attending meetings and being converted to the cause in 1792. Members seceded in the 1840s and founded a new church which eventually became Strict Baptist. A new chapel was founded on 12 May 1862 and opened exactly six months later at a cost of just over £200. A schoolroom was built to the rear in 1901, and the chapel was registered for marriages five years later. It closed in October 2018, but a church plant from Grace Church Guildford reopened it in March 2020.	
Church of the Holy Family (More images)		Heath End; 51.237915°N 0.791811°W	Roman Catholic	–	The foundation stone at this church gives 14 March 1956 as the date of the first Mass and Raphael Martin Sargent as the architect. It was registered for worship and marriages in November 1968.	
St Alban's Church (More images)		Hindhead; 51.124225°N 0.743557°W	Anglican	II	A church for the Hindhead area was first planned in 1899, but the present building was not built until 1907. A tin tabernacle was used from 1904 or 1905. George Cubitt, 1st Baron Ashcombe donated the site of the church, which was designed by John D. Coleridge in a Perpendicular Gothic Revival style "derived from Temple Moore's style". Various extensions were made later in the 20th century, in particular the nave which was completed in 1931. The church was damaged by fire in 1999.	
Brethren Meeting Hall		Hindhead; 51.118829°N 0.734864°W	Plymouth Brethren Christian Church	–	In September 2008, a planning application was submitted to convert a building behind Highcombe Edge, a former Lloyds Bank training centre in Hindhead, into a meeting room for Plymouth Brethren. The training centre itself was also converted into a school. Waverley Borough Council granted permission for the change of use the following month, and the building was registered for Brethren worship accordingly. Highcombe Edge was built by Rayner Storr in 1897 and was later owned by Viscount Exmouth.	
St Martin-by-the-Green Church (More images)		Lower Bourne; 51.195995°N 0.786921°W	Anglican	–	Built of red brick in 1904, this was originally linked to All Saints Church at Tilford as a mission church; it did not receive its present dedication until June 1957. It is one of three churches in the parish of Bourne, serving the south of Farnham.	
Brethren Meeting Room (More images)		Lower Bourne; 51.194833°N 0.787911°W	Plymouth Brethren Christian Church	–	A planning application for a Brethren place of worship on this site was raised in 2002, and the meeting room opened in 2011. It replaced St Michael's Roman Catholic church, which opened before 1971 (when it was served from St Joan of Arc's Church, Farnham) and parished in 1988. It reverted to being a Mass centre served from Farnham just before its closure in 2001.	
St Thomas-on-the-Bourne Church (More images)		Middle Bourne, Farnham; 51.203001°N 0.791955°W	Anglican	–	J. Colson designed the original church in this village (now a suburb) 1 mile (1.6 km) south of Farnham. Part of the 1862 building has been integrated into the new church, forming a Lady chapel. The present church dates from 1911 and is a simple Gothic Revival design by H. Sidebotham with assistance from Sir Charles Nicholson, 2nd Baronet. It is a plain building with a simple interior featuring a wagon-vaulted timber roof.	
St John the Evangelist's Church (More images)		Milford; 51.169654°N 0.647021°W	Anglican	–	This early Victorian church (it was completed in 1844) serves a mostly Victorian village originally in the parish of Witley. Built of Bargate stone, it is the Decorated Gothic Revival style and lacks a spire or tower, although there is a bell-turret. It was extended in 1894 with the addition of an aisle, and Edward Burne-Jones designed some stained glass for the church in 1897 and 1907.	
Milford Baptist Church (More images)		Milford; 51.169432°N 0.652035°W	Baptist	–	Congregational services started in a cottage in the village in 1856, and four years later a 60-capacity chapel was built. A second-hand tin tabernacle (obtained from Alton in Hampshire) was then erected in 1872 when more space was needed, but was replaced by the present "handsome chapel of Bargate stone" on adjacent land in July 1902. It cost £1,200 and had a capacity of 200, and was registered for marriages in March 1904. The chapel continued in Congregational use for much of the 20th century, but its registration was cancelled in August 1982 and it was reregistered for use by a Baptist congregation.	
St Joseph's Church (More images)		Milford; 51.173007°N 0.648912°W	Roman Catholic	–	For many years, Godalming's large parish (including Milford and other outlying areas) was served only by St Edmund's Church in the town centre. The school chapel at Barrow Hills School (Witley) and a chapel of ease at Elstead were the nearest alternatives until a parishioner offered land next to his house in Milford for the construction of an additional church. The firm of Henry Bingham Towner and Partners were commissioned to design the church, and it opened in 1969 and was registered in May of that year. The main material is brownish brick; at the front, a side-oriented tower (in which the entrance is set) dominates.	
St Mark's Church (More images)		Ockford Ridge; 51.181082°N 0.632044°W	Anglican	–	This combined church and community centre dates from 1934 and serves the Ockford Ridge and Aaron's Hill housing estates west of Godalming.	
St Nicholas' Church (More images)		Peper Harow; 51.188152°N 0.663991°W	Anglican	II*	This is an isolated estate village west of Godalming. The tower was erected in 1826 (replacing a timber bell-turret), an Early English Gothic Revival-style north aisle and side chapel were designed by Augustus Pugin in 1844–47, and a porch was built in 1877. Only some parts of the south wall and doorway are from the original Norman church. There are several old monuments inside, mostly to the Viscounts Midleton and their family.	
Rowledge Methodist Church (More images)		Rowledge; 51.18568°N 0.821754°W	Methodist	–	Originally a Wesleyan chapel prior to the Methodist Union of 1932, this was registered for marriages in December 1895.	
Christ Church (More images)		Shamley Green; 51.180762°N 0.522791°W	Anglican	II	A "decent Decorated Gothic Revival-style" chapel of ease to Wonersh, this was built in 1864 to the design of Charles Henry Howell. It was separately parished in 1881. It is of sandstone and is Early English Gothic Revival in style. There is no tower, but the bell-turret has a thin spire. The windows are lancets.	
St Stephen's Church (More images)		Shottermill; 51.086914°N 0.736218°W	Anglican	–	Sources vary on whether this church dates from 1838 or 1846, but it was extended in 1876 to the design of John Penfold, and more work was undertaken in 1892, 1897 and 1910. Although now part of the Haslemere urban area, it was part of the parish of Frensham when originally built (although it was allocated its own parish in 1847). The Gothic Revival church is built of local stone and has a short tower. On the street in front is a war memorial in the form of a Calvary.	
St Michael and All Angels Church (More images)		Thursley; 51.146638°N 0.713312°W	Anglican	I	The present appearance of the church is Victorian as a result of restorations in 1860 by Benjamin Ferrey and, on a much greater scale, by John Penfold in 1883–86. The first church here was a chapel of ease to Witley which dated from about 1100; the simple two-cell layout (nave and narrower chancel) survived until the 19th century, apart from the addition of a porch c. 1230. Little Norman fabric remains now, although the font may be even earlier (possibly Saxon). The central belfry (15th-century) is unusually supported by a thick wooden cage inside the church.	
All Saints Church (More images)		Tilford; 51.181171°N 0.752469°W	Anglican	II	Early English Gothic Revival in style and dating from 1867, this Bargate stone church was designed by Ewan Christian and has a simple layout: chancel, nave with one aisle, vestry, porch and bell-cot. There is a good range of Victorian stained glass, principally by James Powell and Sons and Charles Eamer Kempe. Edwin Lutyens designed one of the gravestones in the churchyard in 1908.	
St Mark's Church (More images)		Upper Hale; 51.234795°N 0.800299°W	Anglican	II	Hale grew rapidly in the late 19th century, and local residents built this church in 1883 as a chapel of ease to St John the Evangelist's Church. Materials include local flints. The site had been donated by Bishop of Winchester Charles Sumner, who had died in 1874. The church, which was listed in December 2021, has a "fine" and "original" scheme of murals in the chancel, painted by local artist Kitty Milroy.	
All Saints Church (More images)		Witley; 51.148727°N 0.647909°W	Anglican	I	A "rambling building ... with a complex building history", this large church has a range of fabric from the 11th to the 19th centuries, including some Saxon work. A large 14th-century side chapel sits alongside the chancel; next comes a central tower flanked by transepts; and the nave has a north vestry and aisle and a south porch with an 11th-century doorway. Fragments of 12th-century wall paintings by monks from Lewes Priory remain. The main materials are Bargate stone and Bath stone with some later brickwork.	
Witley Gospel Hall (More images)		Witley; 51.155528°N 0.656096°W	Open Brethren	–	This Brethren Gospel hall was registered for worship in November 1962 and for marriages in April 1964. Members of one of the local Congregational churches seceded and founded the Witley Gospel Mission, which originally used for worship a room in a building belonging to the local Co-operative Society but which later bought land in the village and built the present meeting hall.	
St John the Baptist's Church (More images)		Wonersh; 51.196102°N 0.549279°W	Anglican	II*	The appearance of this (originally pre-Norman) church is attributable to a 1793 rebuilding by William Norton, 2nd Baron Grantley after fire damage and Charles Nicholson's restoration of 1901. Materials used include ironstone, Bargate stone, Caen stone, clunch, chalk and brick. The tower's position halfway along the north side, at the point where the nave meets the chancel, is unusual. It has three stages and a battlemented top. Two side chapels flank the chancel.	
Wonersh United Reformed Church (More images)		Wonersh; 51.200023°N 0.54529°W	United Reformed	–	The first Congregational services in the parish were held in the Manor house's kitchen from 1859, then moved to a barn. William Seth-Smith (father of architect William Howard Seth-Smith III) was a devout supporter of the cause after the family moved to Wonersh in 1867; he gave land for a new chapel and £500 for its construction, and William Howard Seth-Smith III himself acted as architect. The new £2,500 church opened on 22 September 1880. Under the name Tangley District Congregational Church it was registered for marriages in July 1887.	
Brethren Meeting Hall (More images)		Wormley; 51.144400°N 0.645534°W	Plymouth Brethren Christian Church	–	This meeting room occupies an early 1970s former youth club and nursery school building of brick and tile construction south of Witley. Planning permission for its conversion was granted in June 2007, at which time it was stated the building had been vacant "for approximately ten years".	
St Peter's Church (More images)		Wrecclesham; 51.198037°N 0.817731°W	Anglican	II	James Harding's church of 1840, extended and comprehensively remodelled in 1862 and 1877 by Charles Henry Howell, was described simply as "bad" by architectural historian Nikolaus Pevsner. It was funded by the Paine family, local landowners, and met the needs of this outlying part of Farnham parish. The sandstone was quarried on Paine land at nearby Dippenhall. The organ is believed to have come from St James's Church at Farnham when that was declared redundant.	

== Former places of worship ==
Former places of worship
Name	Image	Location	Denomination/ Affiliation	Grade	Notes	Refs
Primitive Methodist Chapel		Badshot Lea; 51.231930°N 0.761496°W	Methodist	–	An earlier Primitive Methodist chapel in this village near Farnham was superseded by this building in 1902. The first chapel had been built in 1865. The London Gazette also records the certification and subsequent deregistration of a mission hall of unspecified denomination in Badshot Lea in February 1914 and February 1924 respectively.	
Blackheath Congregational Chapel		Blackheath Village; 51.204708°N 0.527316°W	Congregational	–	This was an "out-station" of Guildford Congregational Church. William Seth-Smith of Tangley (father of architect William Howard Seth-Smith III, who designed churches for various denominations in Wonersh, Chilworth and Englefield Green) started holding meetings for worship at a house in 1871; then in 1901, four years after Guildford's chapel took responsibility for the mission, a site was found for a permanent chapel and it opened in December of that year.	
St Timothy's Church (More images)		Boundstone; 51.19082°N 0.807636°W	Anglican	–	This was opened on 31 October 1907 as an Anglican mission hall in the parish of St Peter's Church, Wrecclesham. Its construction cost £215. It was later dedicated to Saint Timothy. Planning permission to convert it into two houses was granted in January 2006.	
Bowlhead Green Congregational Chapel		Bowlhead Green; 51.137192°N 0.691303°W	Congregational	–	This chapel was built in the remote hamlet of Bowlhead Green in Thursley parish in 1865. Its minister Isaac Kettle was a "roving preacher in the Devil's Punch Bowl area". When he died in 1906, he left the chapel (which is attached to a cottage) to a relative in his will, and it was converted for residential use—leaving the hamlet with no place of worship. Its marriage registration (issued in November 1865, when it was described as an Independent chapel) was not formally cancelled until March 1980.	
Providence Chapel (More images)		Chiddingfold; 51.112904°N 0.627694°W	Calvinistic Independent	–	Situated in the centre of Chiddingfold, this was used for worship from its construction in 1873 until 1995 (although it was not registered for marriages until February 1928). It became a house in 1999. The founders were the Cooper family, who owned a walking-stick factory in the village. There was a close working relationship with Woodside Baptist Chapel, and some people attended both.	
St Mary's Church (More images)		Compton; 51.210598°N 0.772592°W	Anglican	–	This small stone-built church in the hamlet of Compton, on the edge of Farnham, was built in 1863 as a schoolroom. It was also used as a place of worship, although it only received an official licence in 1918 and a dedication in 1962 (which reflects its proximity to Waverley Abbey, which was also dedicated to St Mary). The building has a tiled roof and timber windows. Built on a sloping site, it is surrounded by tall trees on a remote road.	
Cranleigh Baptist Chapel		Cranleigh; 51.145037°N 0.495967°W	Baptist	–	The first Baptist preacher in Cranleigh was the former parish clerk, who started small-scale meetings in houses from 1815. Between 1826 and 1828, he built a chapel on land he owned alongside Cranleigh Common. Although it was extended in 1882, the congregation moved seven years later to a new building in the centre of the village (part of the present Cranleigh Baptist Church). The original chapel is now a house. Having been non-denominational until 1862, the congregation became aligned to the Baptist cause in that year.	
Cranleigh Evangelical Free Church		Cranleigh; 51.140477°N 0.483187°W	Evangelical	–	The building was erected c. 1918 after some members of Cranleigh Baptist Church seceded, and it was registered for marriages under the name Evangelical Free Hall in June 1920. A declining congregation forced it to close in November 2000, it was deregistered as a place of worship in March 2001, and after some time on the market it was bought in 2005 and converted into a house by Elspeth Beard Architects of Godalming.	
Victoria Hall		Cranleigh; 51.142316°N 0.490539°W	Non-denominational	–	This was recorded as a Plymouth Brethren meeting room in 1963. In March 1984 it was registered for worship by a non-denominational group, Cranleigh Christian Fellowship, and was later registered for marriages between April 1997 and September 2002.	
Farncombe Baptist Church (More images)		Farncombe; 51.194473°N 0.603949°W	Baptist	–	In the late 1930s, a Brethren group acquired a shop and turned it into St John's Street Hall, nicknamed "The Black Hole" after the dungeon in Calcutta because worshippers were so tightly packed. It was extended to the northwest and given a gabled brick façade by architect T. Chandless-Chamberlain. In the late 20th century Godalming Baptist Church bought it and planted a Baptist church in the building; it was registered for worship and marriages in 1983. In 2010 that church stated that it was "now vacant", and its registration was cancelled in May 2019.	
Farncombe Wesleyan Chapel		Farncombe; 51.196229°N 0.606347°W	Methodist	–	This opened in 1840, succeeding two failed Methodist causes in Godalming (the later of which was founded in 1826 and met in a room above some commercial premises). Members of the Godalming congregation joined it, and the chapel was in use until 1903 when Hugh Price Hughes Memorial Church (now Godalming United Church) opened and worship was consolidated there. The Farncombe chapel is now an Indian restaurant.	
Gospel Hall (More images)		Farncombe; 51.194452°N 0.605349°W	Plymouth Brethren Christian Church	–	Alfred Holland, member of a long-established local family, was "very zealous in religious efforts" in the 19th century and founded several non-denominational Christian missions in tin tabernacles erected on small sites around Godalming. One was the mission hall on Lower Manor Road, which by the late 20th century had become a Plymouth Brethren meeting room. It was registered for worship between October 1973 and March 1980, but was recorded as being in Brethren use by 1963.	
St James's Church (More images)		Farnham; 51.218369°N 0.792539°W	Anglican	II	Nikolaus Pevsner called this Henry Woodyer church of 1876 "a weary routine job". It was executed late in Woodyer's career and was built to cope with the expanding population of Anglican worshippers on the east side of Farnham in the late Victorian era. Designed in "a quirky interpretation of the Early English style", it is of Bargate stone and has no tower or spire, although a tower was planned. It was declared redundant in 1975 and was sold five years later to the council to be converted into housing. The interior of the large (500-capacity) church has now been divided into 16 flats.	
Ebenezer Chapel		Farnham; 51.217720°N 0.794813°W	Congregational	–	Nonconformist meetings took place in the town from the 1660s, and groups identifying as Congregational and Presbyterian met separately for most of the 17th and 18th centuries before uniting when the Presbyterian cause declined. Land behind East Street was acquired and a brick chapel was opened on 16 October 1793. An eastward extension was erected in the 19th century, but a larger building was still needed. The new Congregational (now United Reformed) church opened in 1872, and the former Ebenezer Chapel has been greatly altered since—although its queen post timber roof trusses survive.	
Park Lane Chapel (More images)		Farnham; 51.216585°N 0.798528°W	Strict Baptist	II	The church's predecessor was founded in a converted loft in Farnham by Edward Samuel, a converted Jew (born Nisan Samuel) from Congress Poland. He ministered there for a time in the mid-1840s, and in 1850 a formal church was established. The small chapel on Bear Lane was built in 1852 and served Strict Baptists until c. 1994, after which it was converted into a house. The rendered façade has a round window below a pediment, and the walls are of rubble with brick dressings. It was registered for marriages in June 1870.	
Godalming Congregational Church (More images)		Godalming; 51.187331°N 0.608981°W	Congregational	II	Successor to the original chapel which became the Salvation Army hall, this was designed by W.F. Poulton and built in 1867–68 next to the Town Bridge over the River Wey. A schoolroom was added to the rear in the 1880s. Several Congregational chapels in nearby villages were served from the church during the next century, but in 1977 it was decided to close the church and unite with the Methodist congregation whose chapel stood diagonally opposite. This is still in use as Godalming United Church. Poulton's Gothic Revival Bargate stone and ashlar chapel became an auction house, then a restaurant.	
Salvation Army Hall (More images)		Godalming; 51.185817°N 0.616632°W	Salvation Army	II	Congregationalists built a chapel on this site on Mint Street in 1730, and it was rebuilt a century later at a cost of £634. The congregation continued to grow, and in 1868 the new Godalming Congregational Church was built on Bridge Street. The old chapel (which had been called Ebenezer Chapel) was sold to Methodists, who used it until 1903 when they also built a new church. Thereafter it was leased to, then bought by, The Salvation Army, who used it until 2012. It was sold for office conversion after that. The hall is a Bargate stone building with a rendered Classical frontage.	
Bethel Strict Baptist Chapel		Hale; 51.234005°N 0.791040°W	Baptist	–	Now superseded by the new chapel next to the old Sunday school hall nearby, this was built and opened on 5 June 1834 by its first pastor, William Smith. With its vestry placed at the front as a result of an extension in 1877, it "present[ed] an appearance unlike any other chapel in the country". It is of flint and rendered brick with a tiled roof, and was extended and altered again in the 1970s.	
Three Counties Church		Haslemere; 51.087942°N 0.721289°W	Evangelical	–	The pastor of Milland Evangelical Church in Milland, West Sussex, planted a church in Haslemere in 1966. It occupied rooms at the St John Ambulance headquarters until 1972, when it moved to the former Methodist chapel near the railway station; this was registered for marriages under its new identity (Haslemere Evangelical Church) in June 1972. It was later renamed Three Counties Church, but worship now takes place at a chapel in Hammer in West Sussex and this building is used as the church office.	
Haslemere United Reformed Church (More images)		Haslemere; 51.088282°N 0.712827°W	United Reformed	–	Services started in the house of the founder Christopher Lee of Shottermill in 1792, and 12 years later a chapel was built. It opened on 15 November 1804. As originally built, it had three arched windows set in a rendered façade, but it was altered when a schoolroom was built later in the 19th century and was then superseded by a new brick-built chapel erected alongside it in 1881–82. This was designed by T. Roger Smith and has a gabled frontage with a short turret and spire alongside. Its marriage registration was cancelled in January 1996.	
Tower Road United Reformed Church (More images)		Hindhead; 51.112415°N 0.736766°W	United Reformed	II	One of three local chapels founded and paid for by John Grover, this was originally built as a "general-purpose hall". Its design has been attributed to Norman Shaw. The chapel opened on 9 August 1896, and it was registered for marriages six years later. A manse and school were added in a similar style in 1901, when the church was renamed Hindhead Free Church. There are memorials dated 1913 and 1919 to John Grover and his wife Sarah respectively. A declining congregation and the proximity of Beacon Hill United Reformed Church (also founded by Grover) caused it to close in 2003, and its marriage registration was cancelled in October of that year.	
Bourne Congregational Chapel		Lower Bourne; 51.196019°N 0.790151°W	Congregational	–	The cause in this village south of Farnham was founded before 1843, and the chapel was built prior to this. Extensions were built in the 1890s, and there was a successful Sunday school.	
Shamley Green United Reformed Church		Shamley Green; 51.184882°N 0.526278°W	Congregational	–	The first Congregational chapel here was built in 1836 and was associated with the church at Guildford. Some years later it went out of use and was taken over by Strict Baptists, then the two congregations shared it before the present building (now a house) was erected in September 1900 at a cost of £700 (although the Victoria County History gives a date of 1870). Its marriage registration was cancelled in 1980.	
Tilford House Chapel		Tilford; 51.184791°N 0.75593°W	Independent	II	This is within the grounds of Tilford House and was built in 1776 as an Independent/Presbyterian chapel by Elizabeth Abney, daughter of Sir Thomas Abney, who lived at that house. It was registered as a place of worship for Independents on 25 March 1777 but passed out of religious use by 1854 and is now merely a "simple brick outbuilding", almost rectangular and with a mixture of straight-headed and round-arched windows. The doorcase is topped by a bracketed pediment. The building has a tiled hipped roof, below which runs a dentil cornice.	
Wormley Hill Chapel (More images)		Wormley; 51.138224°N 0.644863°W	Congregational	–	The minister at Godalming Congregational Chapel leased some land in this village near Witley in 1836 and built a chapel. It opened on 4 September 1836, but a larger building was soon needed. The freehold of the site was acquired in 1863, and five years later the present building was erected for £250. It continued to be served by the Godalming chapel into the 20th century, but was later acquired by the neighbouring King Edward's School and integrated into their premises.	
Congregational Mission Hall		Wrecclesham; 51.194424°N 0.815939°W	Congregational	–	This was a small mission hall and school chapel which opened in 1903 with support from the Congregational chapel at Farnham. The land was bought in 1902 for £75, and construction cost £200.	

== Former places of worship demolished since 2000 ==
Former places of worship
Name	Image	Location	Denomination/ Affiliation	Grade	Notes	Refs
Brethren Meeting Hall (More images)		Farnham; 51.208993°N 0.812913°W	Plymouth Brethren Christian Church	–	Planning permission was granted for this brick-built meeting room in 1979 and it was registered (under the name The Hall) in March 1981, replacing one in Upper South View which had been registered in 1970. In March 2015 a planning application was submitted to Waverley Borough Council seeking the demolition of the hall, which was by then disused and vacant, and its replacement with a 64-bed care home. Its registration was formally cancelled in April 2018, prior to which the Brethren had registered a former telephone exchange on the opposite side of West Street as their new place of worship.	
First Church of Christ, Scientist, Godalming (original building) (More images)		Godalming; 51.184485°N 0.618271°W	Christian Scientist	–	This building of c. 1936 replaced Godalming's original Christian Science meeting room. It was demolished in 2016 as part of a scheme to redevelop the site with a care home and a new church slightly to the east.	

== Bibliography ==
- Butler, David M. (1999). The Quaker meeting houses of Britain: Nottinghamshire to Scotland. Vol. 2. Friends Historical Society. ISBN 0-900469-44-7.
- Chambers, Ralph (1952). The Strict Baptist Chapels of England: Surrey and Hampshire. Vol. 1. Thornton Heath: Ralph Chambers.
- Cleal, Edward E.; Crippen, T. G. (1908). The story of Congregationalism in Surrey. London: James Clarke & Co.
- Facey, Roy A., ed. (1981). International Church Index (Doctrinal). Index Publications. ISBN 0-907578-00-4.
- Head, Ronald (2005). Godalming. Francis Frith's Town & City Memories. Teffont: The Francis Frith Collection. ISBN 1-85937-976-1.
- Head, Ronald (1984). Godalming in Old Picture Postcards. Vol. 1. Zaltbommel: European Library. ISBN 90-288-2860-5.
- Head, Ronald (1990). Godalming in Old Picture Postcards. Vol. 2. Zaltbommel: European Library. ISBN 90-288-4965-3.
- Hill, Roy (2002) [1990]. The Assemblies Address Book (PDF) (5th ed.). Bristol: Christian Year Publications. ISBN 1-872734-25-1. Archived from the original (PDF) on 19 September 2004.
- Janaway, John (1987). Yesterday's Town: Godalming. Buckingham: Barracuda Books Ltd. ISBN 0-86023-291-3.
- Methodist Church of Great Britain (1947). Methodist Church Buildings: Statistical Returns including Seating Accommodation as at July 1st, 1940 (PDF). Manchester: The Department for Chapel Affairs. (Available online in 14 parts; Guide to abbreviations on page 6)
- Miller, Michael (1995). Around Cranleigh. The Archive Photographs Series. Chalford: The Chalford Publishing Co. ISBN 0-7524-0143-2.
- Nairn, Ian; Pevsner, Nikolaus (1971) [1962]. The Buildings of England: Surrey (2nd ed.). Harmondsworth: Penguin Books. ISBN 0-300-09675-5.
- Polack, Bernard; Whitbourn, John (1999). The Catholic parish of St Edmund King & Martyr, Godalming, 1899–1999. Farnham: Arrow Press.
- Stell, Christopher (2002). Nonconformist Chapels and Meeting-houses in Eastern England. Swindon: English Heritage. ISBN 1-873592-50-7.
- Stock, Peter (1999). Hidden Nonconformity: a study of Nonconformity in the Godalming area from the 17th century. Farnham: Arrow Press.
- Stockwell, Arthur H., ed. (1909). The Baptist Churches of Surrey. London: Arthur Stockwell.
- The Diocese of Arundel & Brighton (1971). Diocese of Arundel & Brighton Catholic Directory 1971. Purley: Roman Catholic Diocese of Arundel and Brighton.
- The Diocese of Arundel & Brighton (1988). Diocese of Arundel & Brighton Catholic Directory 1988. Purley: Roman Catholic Diocese of Arundel and Brighton.
- The Diocese of Arundel & Brighton (2001). Diocese of Arundel & Brighton Catholic Directory 2001. Purley: Roman Catholic Diocese of Arundel and Brighton.
- Winter, Tim; Collyer, Graham (1991). Around Haslemere and Hindhead in Old Photographs. Stroud: Alan Sutton Publishing. ISBN 0-86299-937-5.
