= St Peter's Church, Hascombe =

St Peter's, Hascombe
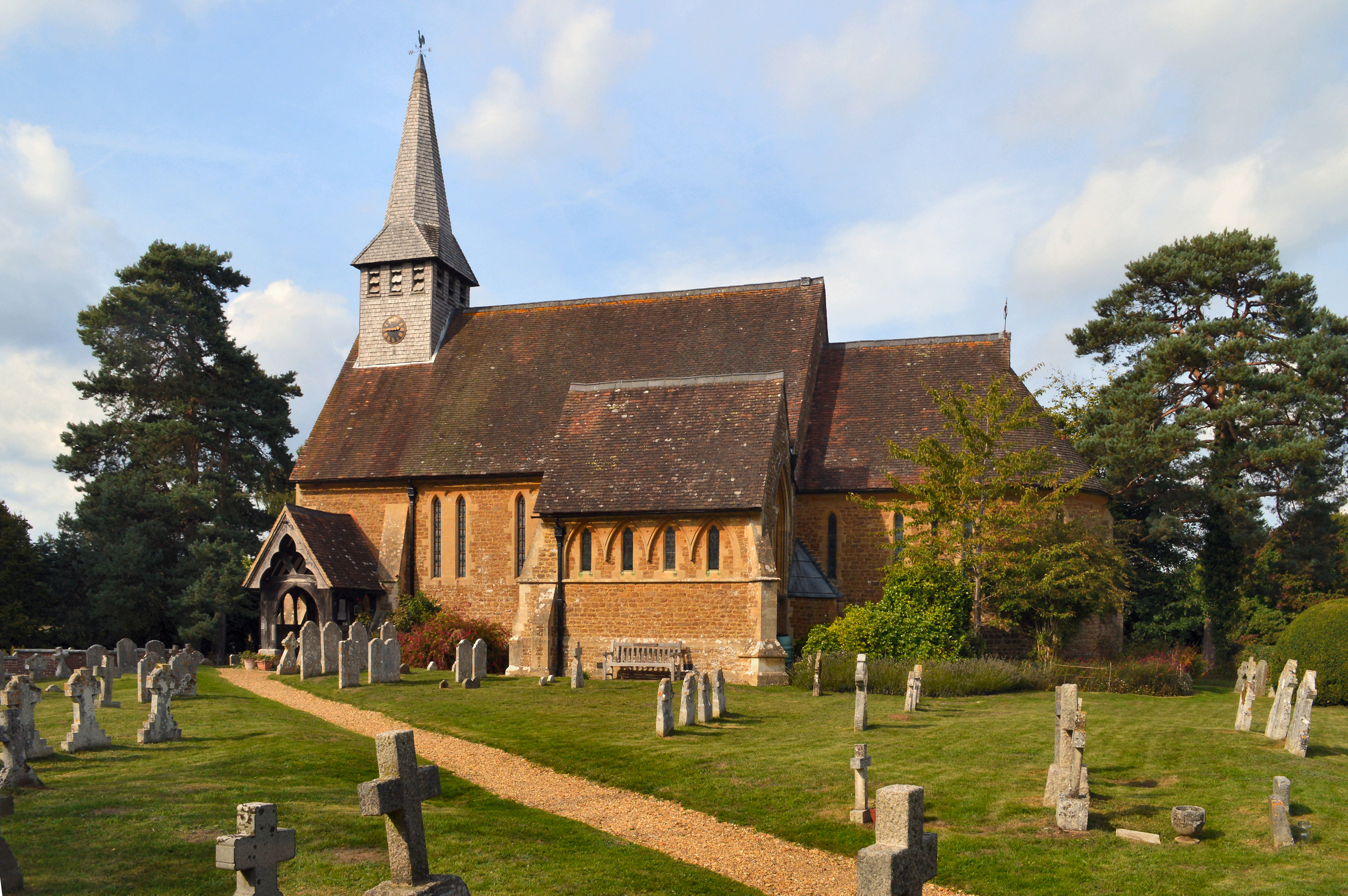
- St Peter's, Hascombe
- 51°08′47″N 0°34′09″W
- Address: Church Road, Hascombe, Surrey
- Country: England
- Denomination: Anglican

History
- Status: Parish church
- Founder: Vernon Musgrave
- Dedication: St Peter
- Consecrated: June 1864

Architecture
- Architect: Henry Woodyer
- Style: Gothic Revival
- Years built: 1862-1864; Lady chapel 1935
- Construction cost: £3,100

Specifications
- Materials: Bargate stone

Administration
- Diocese: Guildford
- Parish: St Peter's, Hascombe with St Mary's, Dunsfold

Clergy
- Pastor

Listed Building – Grade II*
- Official name: Church of St Peter
- Designated: 28 October 1986
- Reference no.: 1240725

St Peter's church in Hascombe, which is grade II* listed, was rebuilt during the mid-19th century, and the new church consecrated in June 1864. The original church dated from the 13th century but by 1862, when Canon Vernon Musgrave became rector, it was described as being in a poor condition. Musgrave set about raising funds to have the church rebuilt, paying for the chancel himself and persuading four local landowners to pay for the rest. The architect of the new church was Henry Woodyer, a pupil of William Butterfield. During the demolition and rebuilding, services were held in the village pub, The White Horse.

The church is built of local Bargate stone, with a simple nave, chancel, and lady chapel. The roof rafters are cusped and gilded. The stained-glass is mostly by Hardman and Powell and the decoration is by J A Pippet, a freelance artist employed by Hardman. The medieval rood screen, made from Jerusalem olive trees and featuring elaborate carvings and paintings, remains from the old church and was restored in 1864 and decorated by Hardman and Powell. The font of Purbeck marble, also recovered from the old church, dates back to 1690. The belfry, reached by a spiral staircase from the nave, houses a ring of five bells.

Regarded by Nikolaus Pevsner as one of Surrey's best Victorian churches and one of the best by Henry Woodyer. John Betjeman described the church as "a Tractarian work of art". The walls of the nave are decorated with the scene of the ‘miraculous draught of fishes’ with 'one hundred and fifty and three' fishes caught in a net dragged by the six disciples. Above the chancel arch is a painting of the Last Judgement, and on the inside of the arch is a picture of our Lord with angels. The walls of the choir and sanctuary have scenes from the Bible depicting the ministry of Angels. The stained glass in the chancel are scenes from the life of our Lord. The central window shows Christ on the cross. The reredos above the altar shows the Adoration of the Lamb. At the entrance to the chancel is a Victorian brass to Canon Musgrave. The pulpit panels show our Lord together with Noah, St Peter, and St John the Baptist. The west window, by William Holland shows Jesus in the fishing boat calming the storm, is in memory of Conyers Middleton who was rector from 1747 to his death in 1750. The Lady Chapel was created in 1935 and contains a squint window. The east window in the Lady Chapel is by Clayton and Bell and the lancet windows, commemorating the Godman family, are by Hardman and Powell.

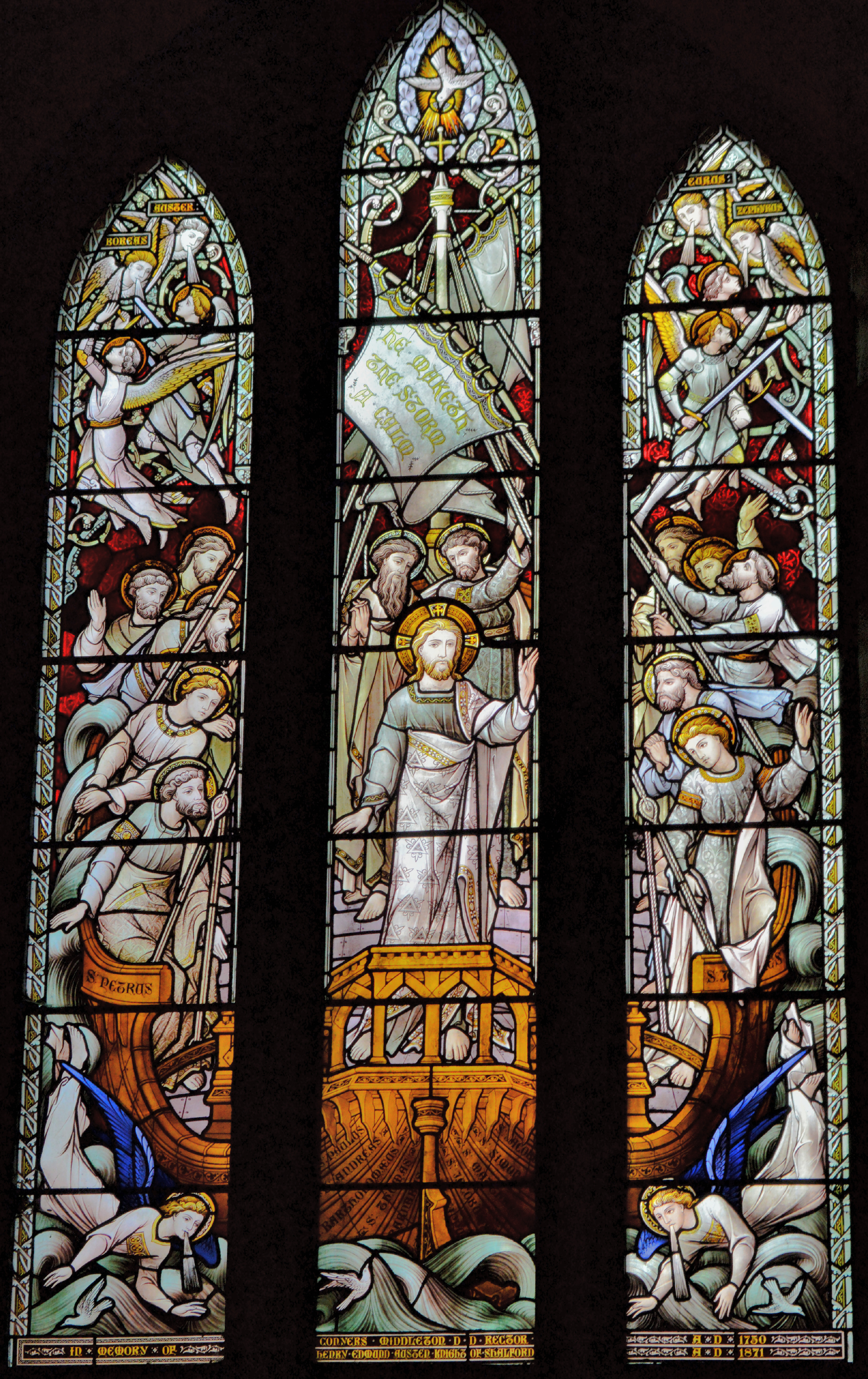
West window

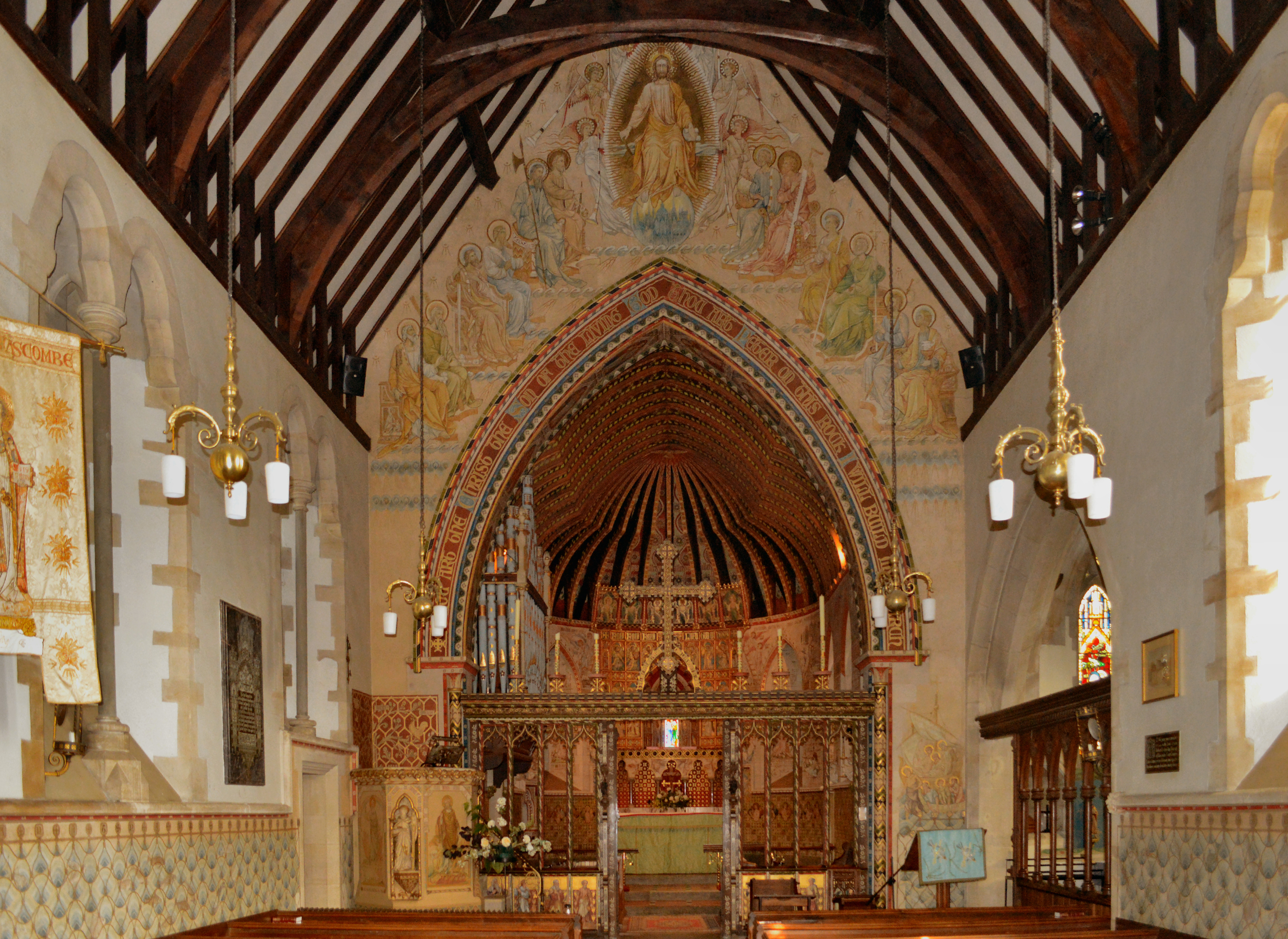
View of the nave

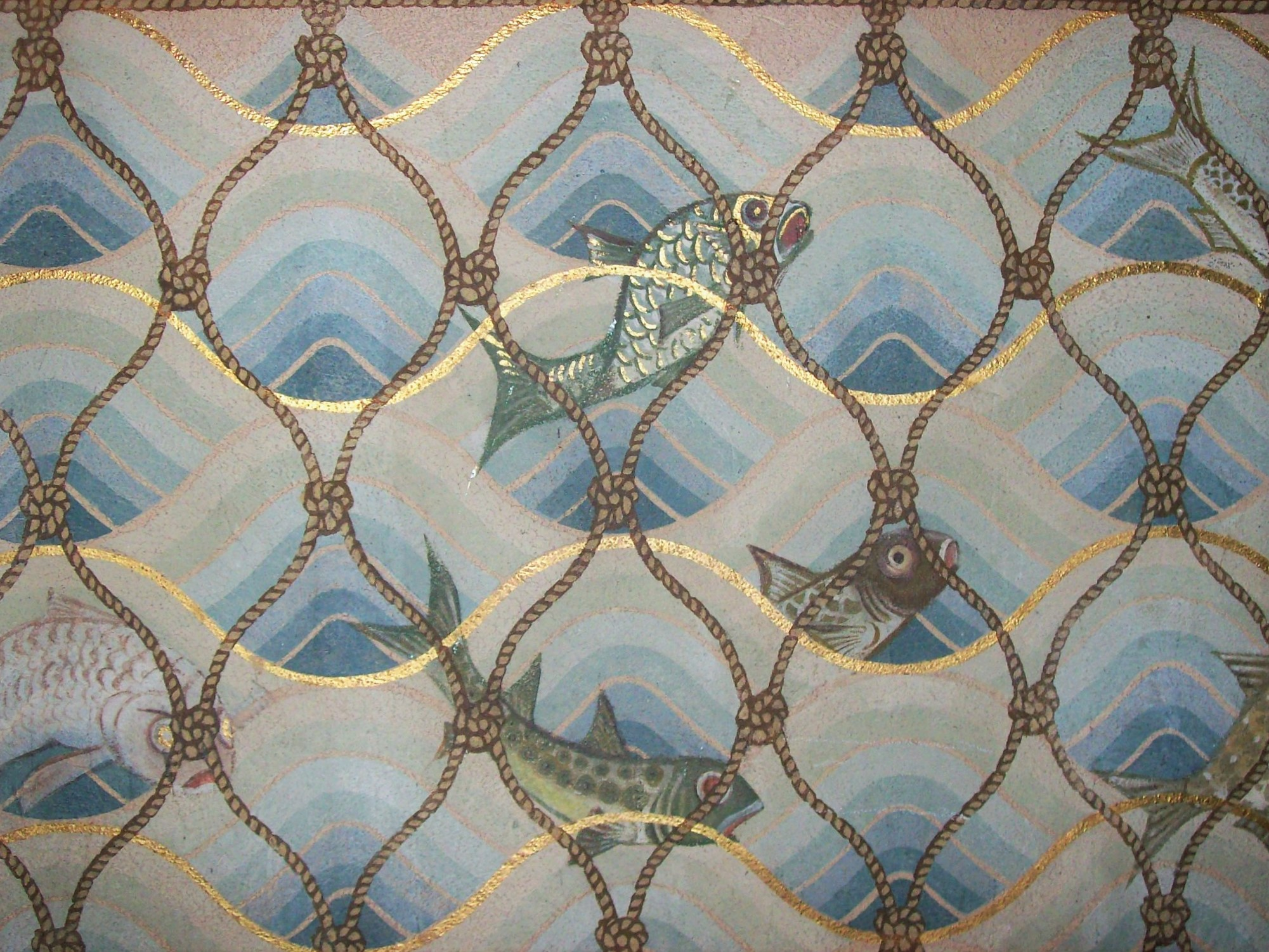
Miraculous draught of fishes

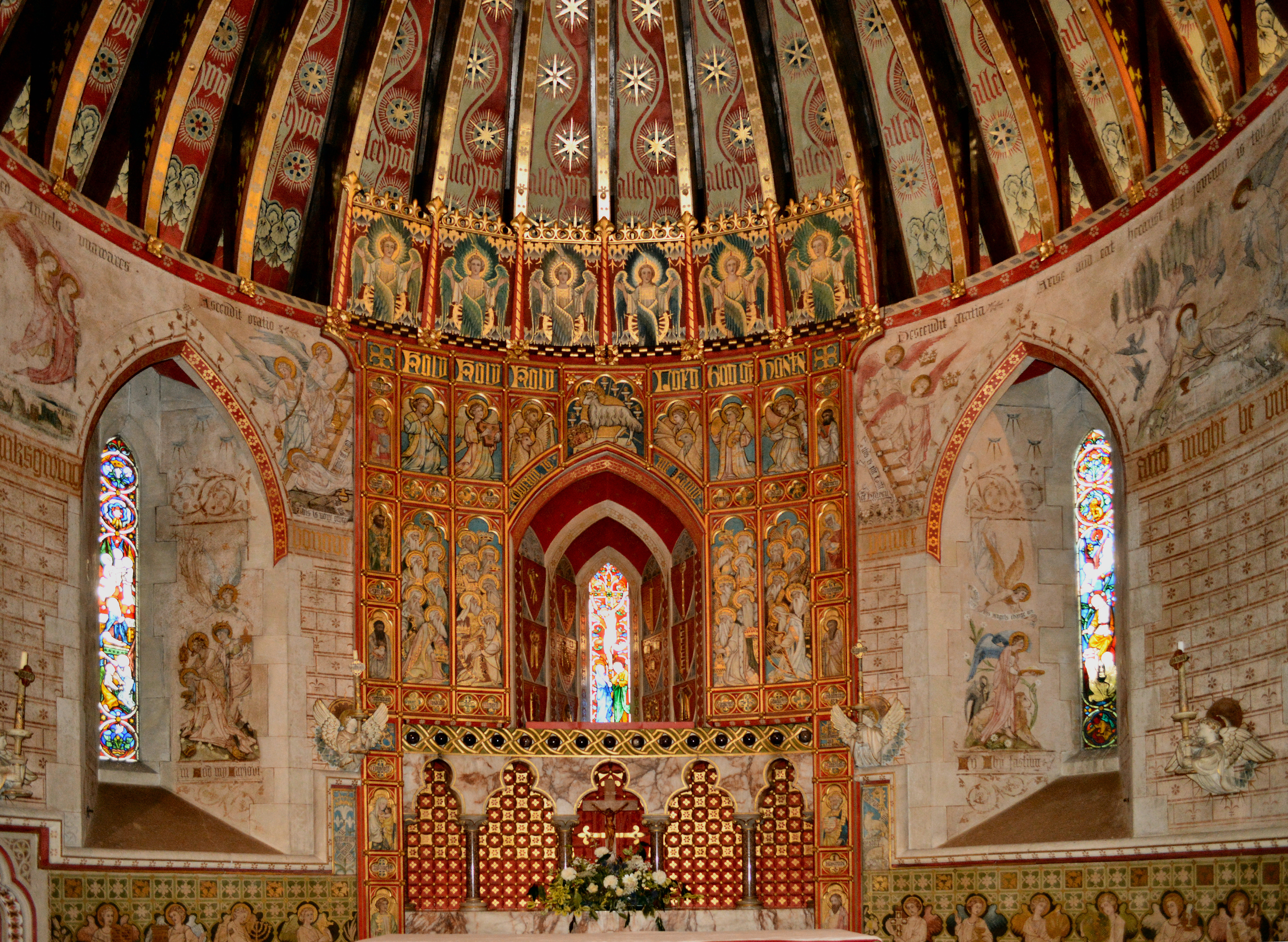
The sanctuary

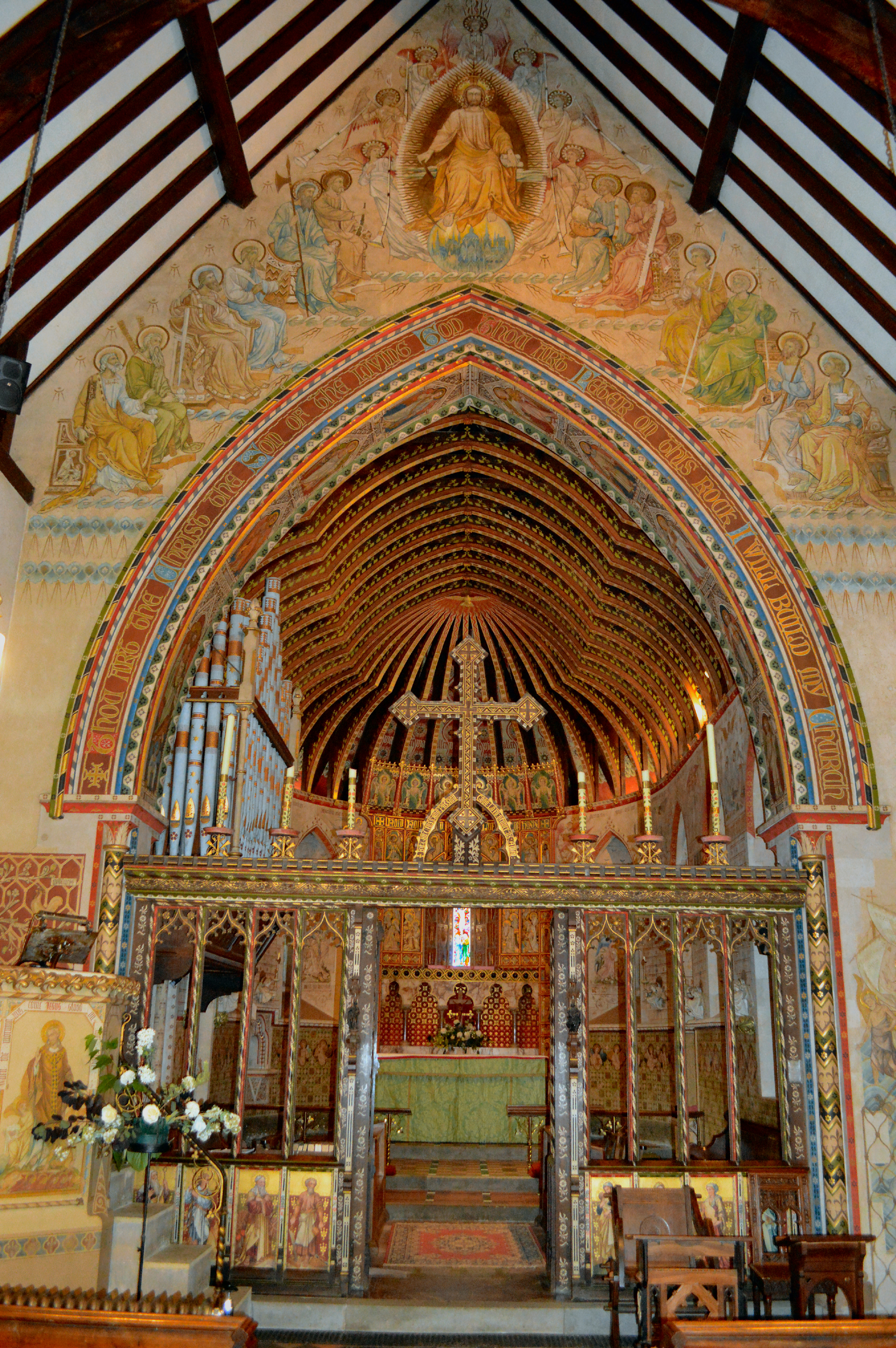
The rood screen

== See also ==
- List of places of worship in Waverley (borough)
