= St Joan of Arc's Church, Farnham =

St Joan of Arc Church, Farnham
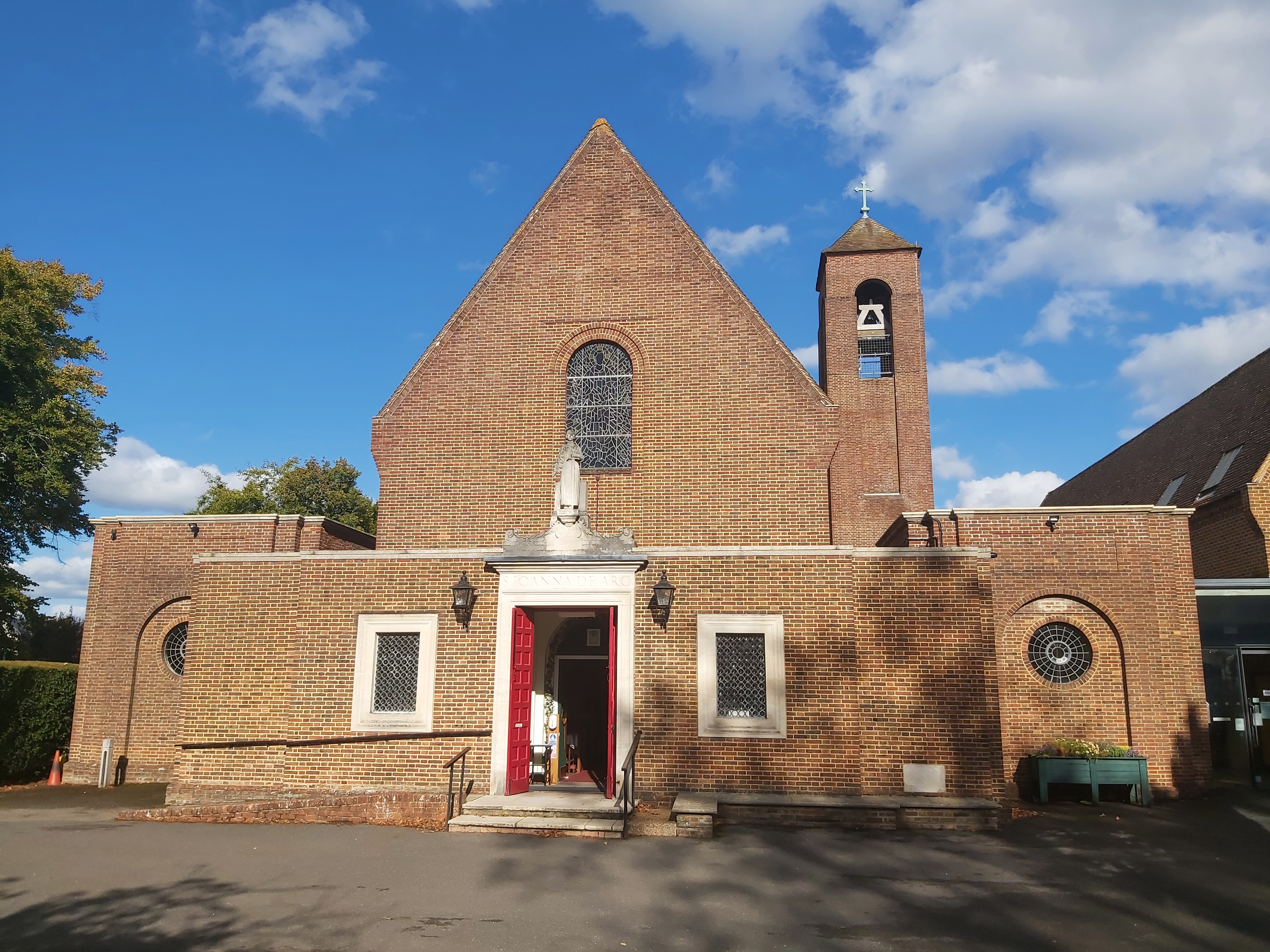
- Front entrance of the church

- Location in Surrey
- 51°12′40″N 0°47′21″W
- OS grid reference: SU 84670 46460
- Location: Farnham, Surrey
- Country: England
- Denomination: Roman Catholic
- Website: StJoanofArcFarnham.co.uk

History
- Status: Parish church
- Founded: 26 January 1890
- Founder(s): Fr Mathieu Gerin; Fr Etienne Robo
- Dedication: Saint Joan of Arc

Architecture
- Functional status: Active
- Heritage designation: Grade II
- Designated: 3 June 2010
- Architect: John Edward Dixon-Spain
- Style: Romanesque Revival
- Groundbreaking: 23 May 1929
- Completed: 30 May 1930

Administration
- Province: Southwark
- Diocese: Arundel and Brighton
- Deanery: Guildford

Clergy
- Priest: Father Simon Dray

St Joan of Arc Church is a Roman Catholic Parish church in Farnham, Surrey. It was founded in 1890 and built in its present location in 1929. It was decided that the Farnham church should be dedicated to St Joan of Arc because Farnham Castle was a residence of Cardinal Henry Beaufort who was present at her trial. It is a Romanesque Revival church and a Grade II listed building. It is situated between Tilford Road and Waverley Lane, south of Farnham Railway Station.

== History ==
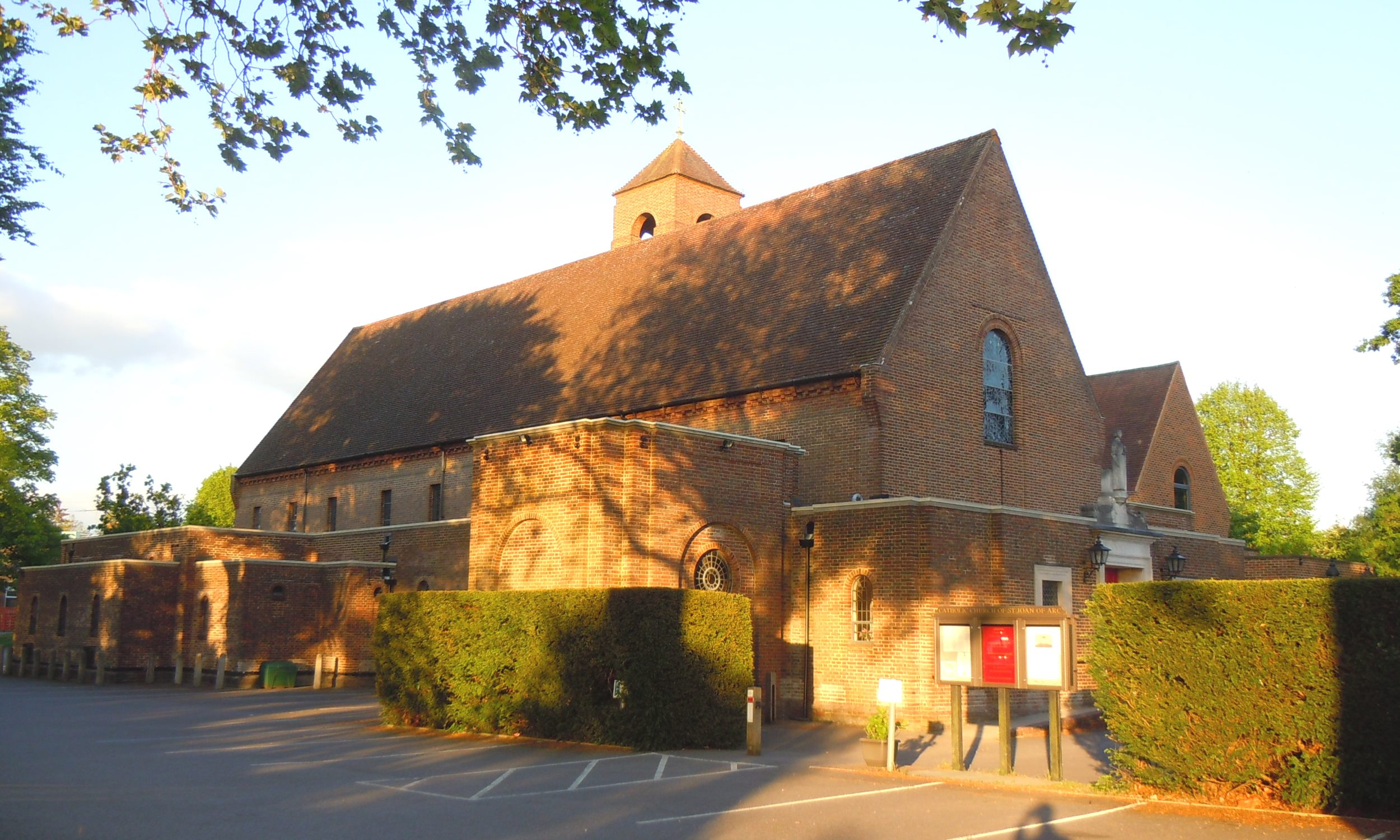
The church from the northwest

=== Frensham Place ===
In 1888, a Fr Mathieu Gerin came from France to say Mass for the Catholics in Farnham. Originally, he did this in a temporary chapel in Frensham Place, a country house that became Edgeborough School.

=== Bear Lane ===
By 1890, a larger place was needed to accommodate an increasing congregation. So Fr Gerin bought an old disused police station in Bear Lane, down hill from Farnham Castle. The top floor was turned into a church, dedicated to Saint Polycarp and the ground floor became a school. Soon the school outgrew its location and had to move next door.

=== Tilford Road ===
In 1913, eight years after Fr Gerin retired, Fr Etienne Robo came to serve the local church. After World War I he returned from France in 1919. In 1922 he realised that a new church site had to be sought to accommodate the larger congregation.

Joan of Arc was canonised in 1920 and Fr Robo wanted a church dedicated to the saint in the town that was a principal residence of Cardinal Beaufort who presided at her trial in 1431, was present at her execution and ordered her ashes to be thrown into the River Seine.

In 1923, a site was bought at Tilford Road. It was originally a gravel and rubbish pit. In 1928, after the ground was levelled and made safe, work started on the new church.

Waverley Lane leads from the church to Waverley Abbey, the ruins of an old Cistercian Monastery. In 1928, a huge celebration of the abbey's foundation, in 1128, took place with Cardinal Francis Bourne in attendance. This helped gain local public support for the new church.

In 1929, the foundation stone was laid by Bishop Peter Amigo of Southwark. The church was designed by John Edward Dixon-Spain (d. 1955) in the Romanesque Revival style and contains statues by the sculptor Vernon Hill.

On 30 May 1930, the feast day of St Joan of Arc, the church was opened and two years later it was given the status of a parish church.

== Parish ==
The church shares the site around it with St Polycarp's Catholic Primary School; the school keeping its original name from when it was located with the church in Bear Lane. The church has a close relationship with the school; Mass and services with the children are regularly held throughout the term, and are also attended by parents. The school states that its ethos and curriculum 'places great emphasis on religious education, worship and respect.' It is also a feeder school for All Hallows Catholic School in Weybourne, Surrey.

The church celebrates Mass everyday and has four Sunday Masses. The Sunday Masses are at: 5pm (Saturday Vigil), 9.15am, 11.15am and 5pm (Sunday Youth Mass).

In 2008, the St Joan's Centre was opened next door to the church. It acts as a hall for parish events and groups and can host other organisations that want to use it. The parish groups and associations include youth groups, adult formation groups, and prayer groups, as well as those working with the Make Poverty History campaign, a badminton club and Arcaid, a small, independent overseas aid charity, based in the parish.

Also within the parish is More House School, an independent boys' school for those with learning difficulties. The school prospectus states that it has close links with the local parish. A Catholic service is held in the school chapel every week.

Further down Waverley Lane from the church is the Phyllis Tuckwell Hospice, which offers palliative care to sick adults. The parish priest acts as chaplain to the hospice.

== See also ==
- Farnham Castle
- List of places of worship in Waverley (borough)
- Waverley Abbey
