= Godalming United Church =

Church in Surrey, England

Coordinates: 51.189°N 0.607°W

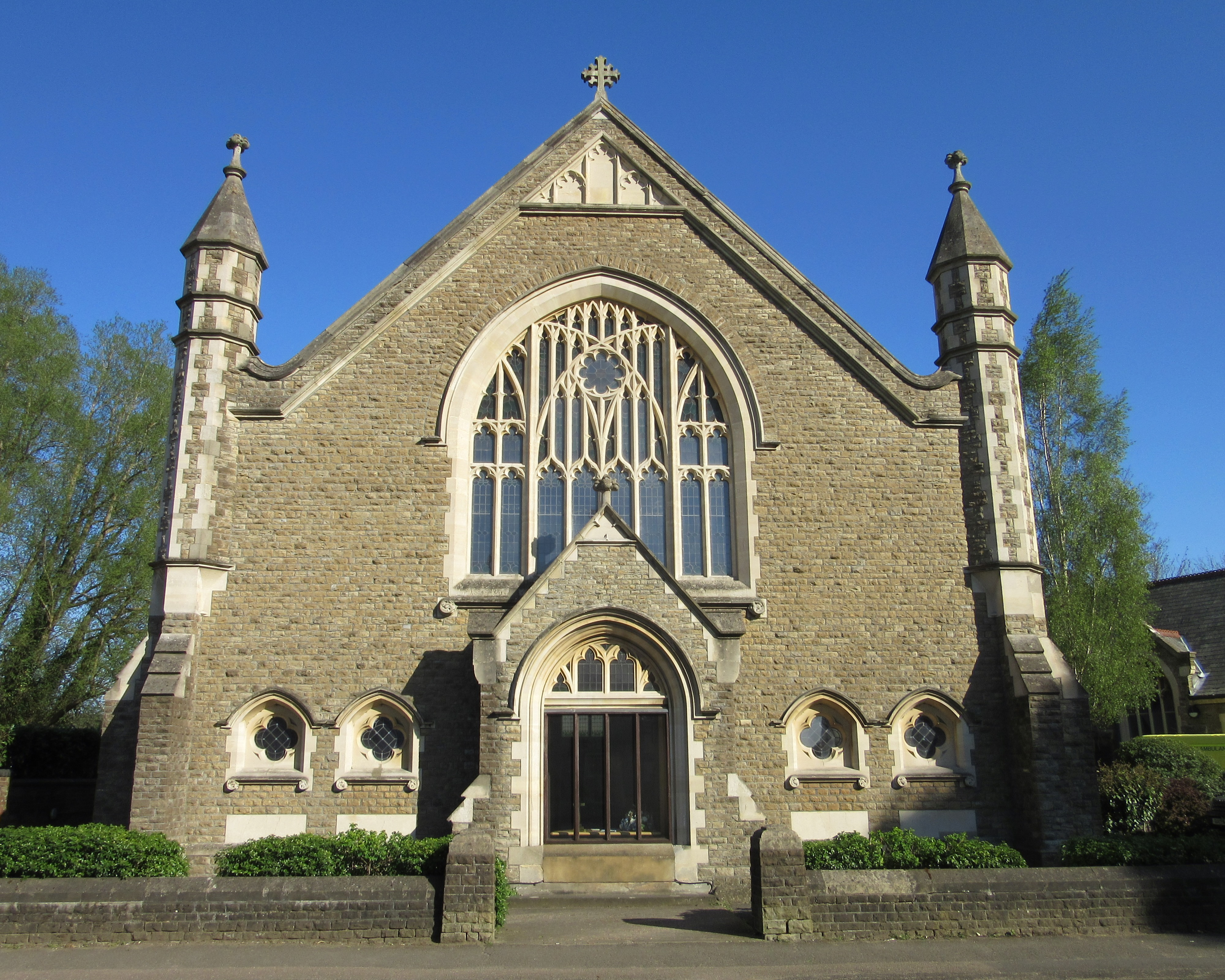
The façade of the church

Godalming United Church is a non-conformist church formed in 1977 of a union of the local Methodist and URC churches. Built in 1903, it is located between the fire station and the River Wey in Godalming. Godalming United Church is a registered place of worship for marriage, both of opposite-sex and same-sex couples. Godalming United Church is registered with the Charities Commission as a charity (number 1128613).

== Ministers ==
The post of minister has alternated between a Methodist and a URC ordained minister:

- 1977 - 1981, John Walker (Methodist)
- 1981 - 1986, Howard Starr (URC)
- 1986 - 1991, Bernard Arnold (Methodist)
- 1991 - 1992, Susan Daldorff (URC)
- 1992 - 1993, vacant
- 1993 - 2004, Trevor Allen (Methodist)
- 2004 - 2012, Paul Dean (URC)
- 2012 - 2019, Paul Hulme (Methodist)
- 2020 - , Adam Payne (URC)

== In the news ==
- In January 2022, Godalming United Church was used as an initial evacuation point for residents of a block of flats when there was a fire in which one person perished.

== See also ==
- List of places of worship in Waverley (borough)
