= Weybourne, Surrey =

Village in Surrey, England

Coordinates: 51.23°N 0.78°W

Weybourne
- Location within the United Kingdom
- Population: 4,176 (2001 including Badshot Lea)
- OS grid reference: SU8549
- District: Waverley
- Shire county: Surrey
- Country: England
- Sovereign state: United Kingdom
- Post town: FARNHAM
- Postcode district: GU9
- Dialling code: 01252
- UK Parliament: Farnham and Bordon

Weybourne is a small village in Surrey, England. It lies on the outskirts of Farnham in Surrey, and borders Aldershot in Hampshire.

== History ==
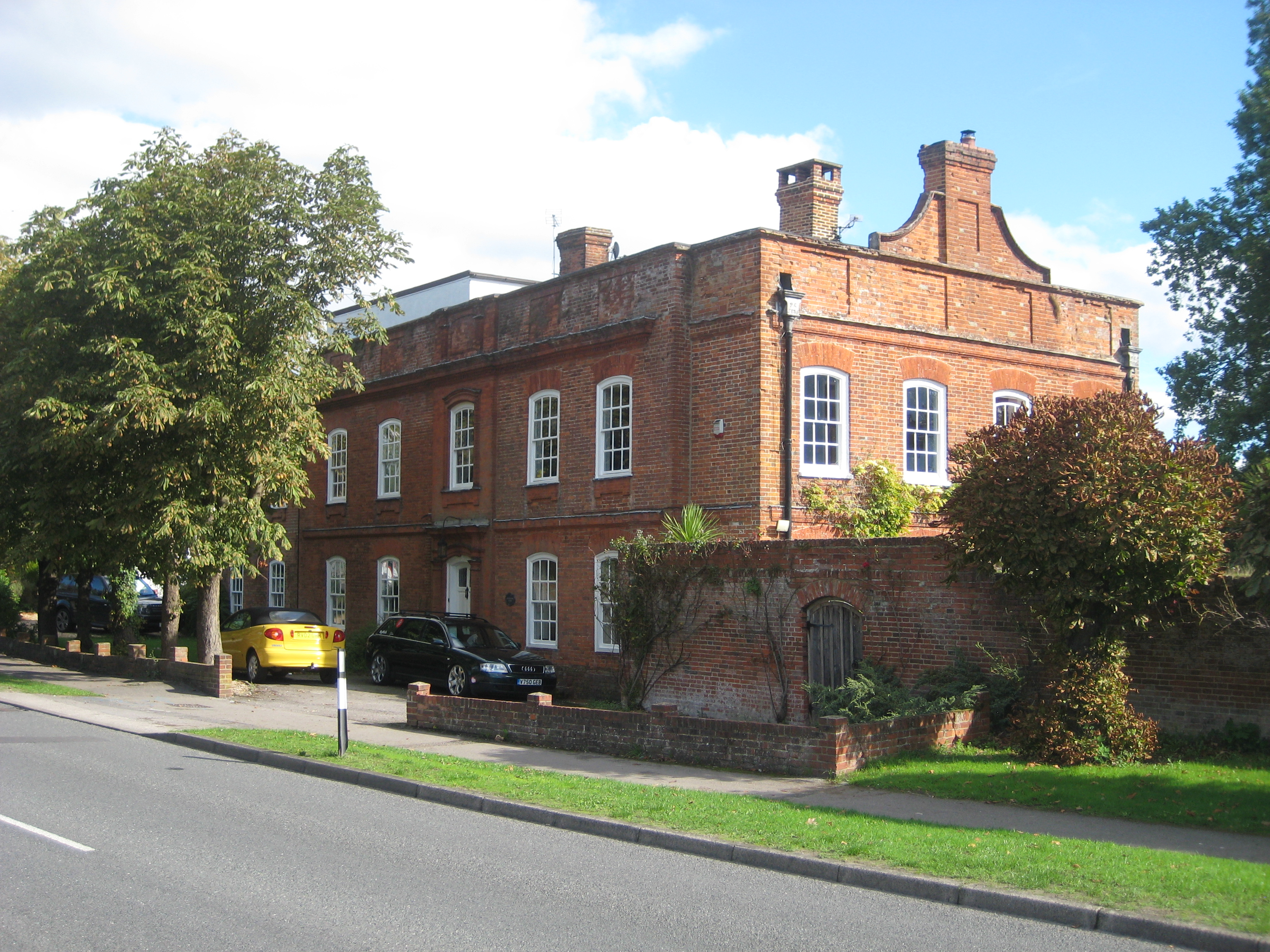
Weybourne House, Farnham

Weybourne appears on the 1816 Ordnance Survey First Series map as Weyburn, and is limited to a few buildings to the south and east of the Weybourne Road / Weybourne Lane crossroads. The buildings to the south of that crossroad are dominated by Weybourne House, a grade II* listed building dated at 1724.

The name of the village may derive from that of the house, which in turn is made up of two elements: "Wey", being the name of the river running through Farnham, and 'bourne" or "burn" meaning 'stream'.

== Geography ==
Weybourne lies to the north-east of Farnham, bordering the villages of Hale, Heath End and Badshot Lea, as well as the town of Aldershot to the north. The village centres around the crossroads of Weybourne Road (the B3007) and Upper and Lower Weybourne Lane. Its northern extent is demarcated by the river Blackwater, the ancient border of Surrey and Hampshire. The source of this river is within the Rowhill Copse Nature Reserve, which can be accessed via a number of points from Weybourne.

To the east, the village borders Badshot Lea and is bounded by the railway line between Aldershot and Farnham. The western boundary with the villages of Heath End and Hale is less clear, but the district ward boundary between the wards of Farnham Weybourne & Badshot Lea and Farnham Hale & Heath End does run between the B3007 (Weybourne Road) and the A325 (Farnborough Road) crossing Upper Weybourne Lane. In the south, Monkton Lane running from Hale to Badshot Lea crosses Weybourne Road and, where it does so, lies the boundary into Farnham proper from Weybourne.

Two nature reserves are in whole or in part within the village:

- Weybourne Local Nature Reserve
- Rowhill Copse Nature Reserve.

== Governance ==
Weybourne has a village hall but no civil parish. The area is represented, along with Badshot Lea, at Waverley Borough Council by two councillors: Andrew Laughton (Farnham Residents) and Richard Steijger (Liberal Democrats). Of the 81 single-member electoral divisions of Surrey County Council, Weybourne is in Farnham North, represented by Catherine Powell (Farnham Residents).

The village is part of the Farnham and Bordon parliamentary constituency.

== Demographics and housing ==
The central village comprises housing from the mid-to-late Victorian period, mainly along Weybourne Road. This includes The Old School House, built originally in the late-19th century as a Sunday School, then used as a local school. The school bell is still intact, although moved to the side of the building; the School House is now a private dwelling.

There is local authority housing from the 1940s and 1950s off Upper Weybourne Lane, and additional private housing was built in the late 1960s and early 1970s off Lower Weybourne Lane and Upper Weybourne Lane. Housing has been added sporadically since, with residential flats and some smaller housing developments in the 1980s and early 1990s. Towards the edge of the village, near the border with Aldershot, the housing changes in character with housing from the 1920s and 1930s being more prevalent.

== Education ==
The village has three schools:

- William Cobbett Primary School was formed in 2015 with the merger of William Cobbett Junior School (opened in 1974) and Weybourne Infant School (originally opened in 1972 as Weybourne County First School).
- All Hallows Catholic School – a mixed, voluntary-aided comprehensive secondary school and sixth form. The most recent Ofsted overall rating, in 2014, placed the school in the top category.
- Farnham Heath End School. (Note: Farnham Heath End School has been included as it borders Weybourne and Heath End villages, with William Cobbett Primary School separated only by their playing fields. Farnham Heath End School also has an entrance from Bullers Road, which is in Weybourne and not Heath End.)

== Amenities ==
- Village hall
- Sub-Post Office
- Premier newsagent
- Bakery
- The Running Stream public house
- The Elm Tree public house.

Weybourne is the home of a number of sports clubs and facilities including:

- Farnham RFU club (between Weybourne and Badshot Lea)
- Farnham United Football Club (between Weybourne and Badshot Lea)
- Weybourne Recreational Ground - sports facilities on offer include pootball pitches and a pavilion (utilised by Badshot Lea Football Club) and a tennis court
- Nuffield and David Lloyd gyms.

Weybourne has no formal places of worship. The village lies within the Church of England Parish of Badshot Lea and Hale which, in turn, is in the Deanery of Farnham, part of the Diocese of Guildford.

== Notable people ==
John Henry Knight driving his own creation: The first petroleum carriage for two people made in England

- John Henry Knight – Pioneering motorist and automobile manufacturer; lived in Weybourne House, before moving to Barfield in Runfold, Farnham.
- Dame Vera Lynn – singer; as a child she stayed with an aunt in the village every summer until the start of World War II.
- Jessie Matthews – actress; once lived in Weybourne Road, Weybourne.
- George Mesher (1860–1938) – architect and contractor who built many edifices in Victoria, British Columbia.
- Jonny Wilkinson – former England rugby union player and Rugby World Cup winner – attended William Cobbett Junior School and Weybourne Infant School.
