= Upper Hale Cemetery, Farnham =

Cemetery in Surrey, England

Coordinates: 51°14′07″N 0°48′01″W

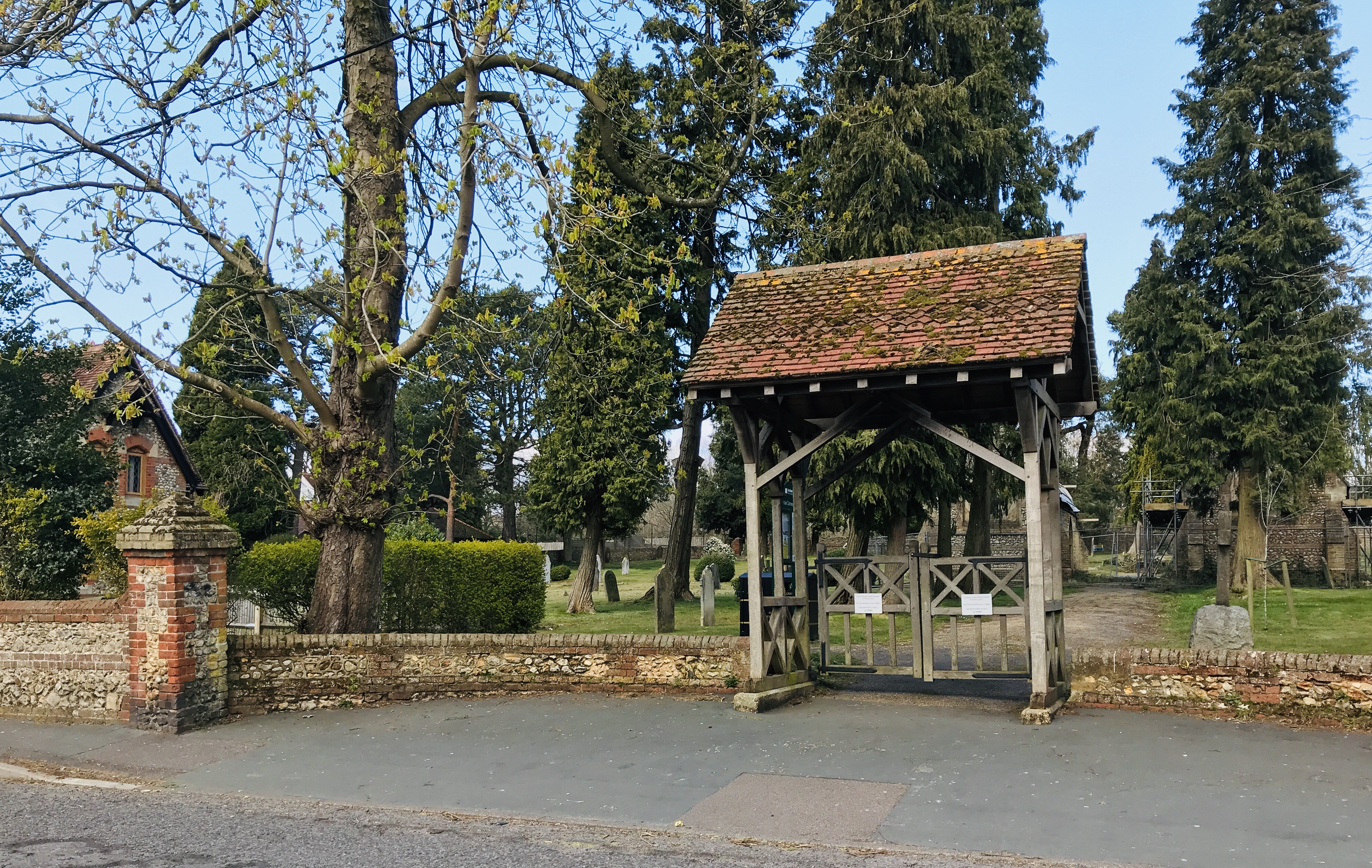
The gates to Hale Cemetery in 2020

Upper Hale Cemetery (also known as Hale Cemetery) is the burial ground for the district of Hale in Farnham in Surrey.

Hale grew rapidly after 1854 when the British Army became established in nearby Aldershot in Hampshire. At this time many people came to the area seeking employment in building Aldershot and the military barracks. As the cottages spread, those nearer to Aldershot formed a separate village, which became known as Heath End. As more homes were built and the local population expanded it soon became obvious that a new burial ground at Hale was needed as the churchyard at St John the Evangelist Church in Hale gradually began to fill. Locals could also be buried at the new cemetery at West Street Cemetery in town, also known as Farnham Cemetery, and at Badshot Lea Cemetery. However, Farnham Burial Board advised St John the Evangelist church in Hale to apply for Common land from the War Office. Funds to purchase the land for a new cemetery and to build the two small chapels came from the Hale Poor rates and in 1872 the War Office provided 2 acres (0.81 ha) of land as a burial ground for the people of Upper Hale. The church of St Mark the Evangelist was built opposite the cemetery in 1883.

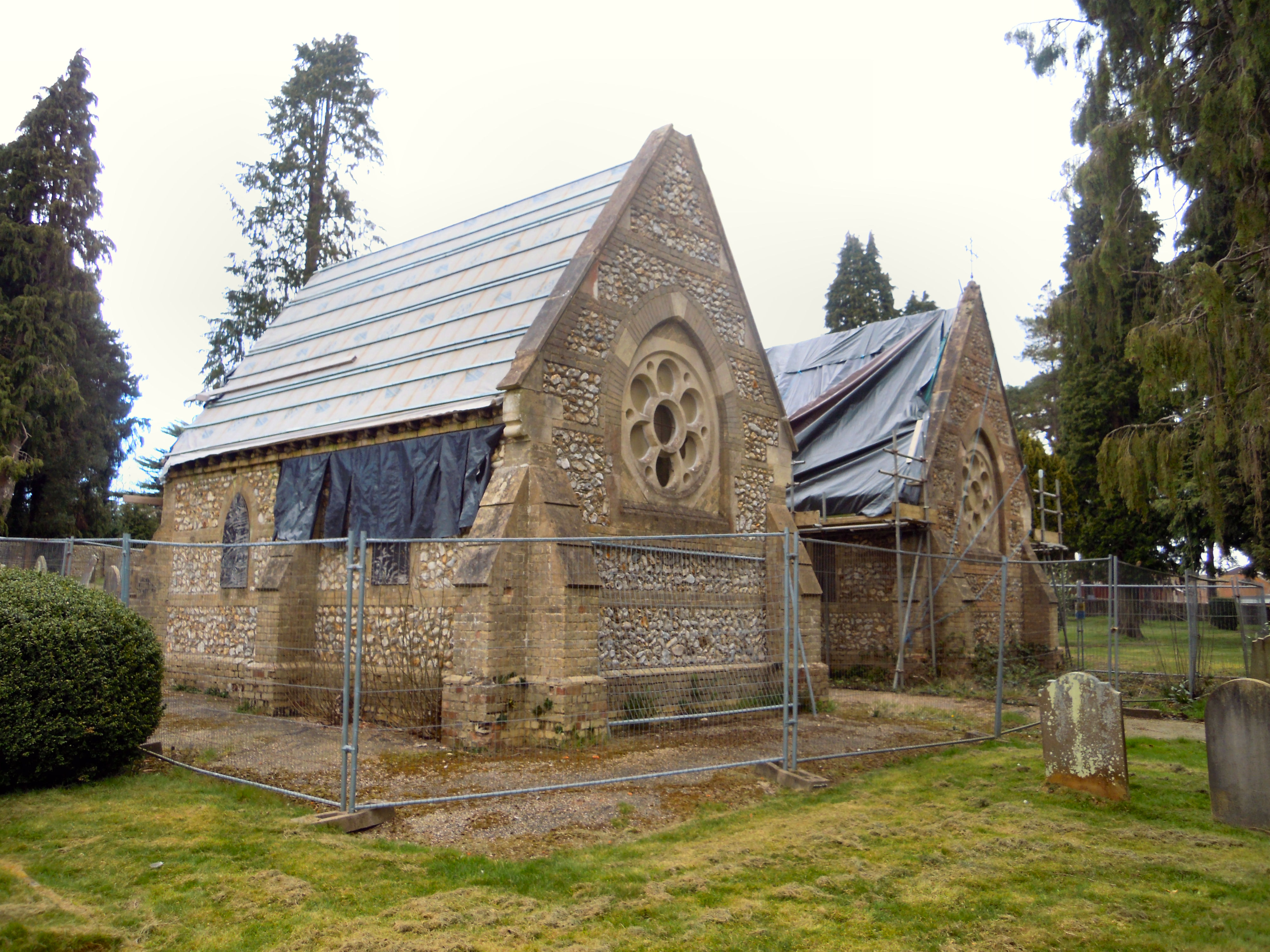
The chapels at the cemetery in 2020

It took 8 months to convert the rough land into ground suitable for a cemetery and to build the two chapels in addition to walling the area and marking out the land. Upper Hale Cemetery was consecrated by Samuel Wilberforce, the Bishop of Winchester on 1 November 1872 and the first burial took place two weeks later on 27 November 1872.

The two small chapels in the cemetery have now been partially demolished and a garden created in their place.

Upper Hale Cemetery has 20 burials from the two World Wars – 16 from World War I and 4 from World War II with their distinctive Commonwealth War Graves Commission headstones. Among the WWII burials is Pte. Maud Rose Payne (1925–1945) of the Auxiliary Territorial Service who was from Farnham.

== Notable burials ==
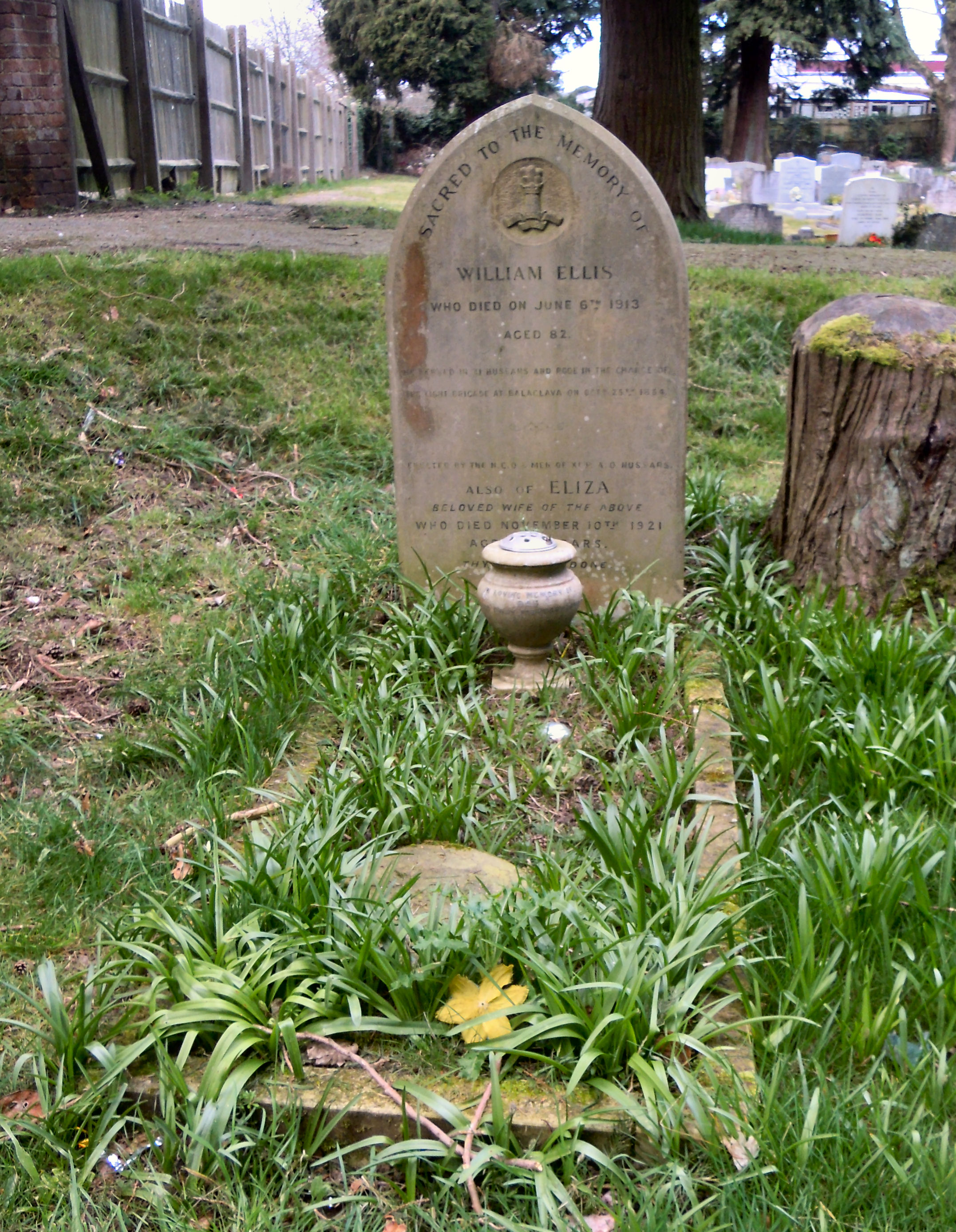
Grave of William Ellis in Upper Hale Cemetery (2020)

- William Ellis (1831–1913), served in the 11th Hussars during the Crimean War and is said to have taken part in the Charge of the Light Brigade in 1854. The military historians William Lummis and E. J. Boys wrote that Ellis 'probably charged'; Lummis, who met him, described him as a 'simple man'. His gravestone was bought by his old regiment and bears the regimental crest. The inscription reads: ‘He served in the XI Hussars and rode in the Charge of the Light Brigade at Balaclava on October 25th 1854’.
- Major-General Henry William Newcome (1875-1963) CB, CMG, DSO, who served in the Second Boer War and World War I. He went on to be Major-General, Royal Artillery for the Indian Army in February 1933 and then General Officer Commanding the 50th (Northumbrian) Division from April 1928 until he retired in February 1931.
