= Edgar Gibson =

British bishop (1848–1924)

The Right Reverend Edgar Gibson
- Bishop of Gloucester
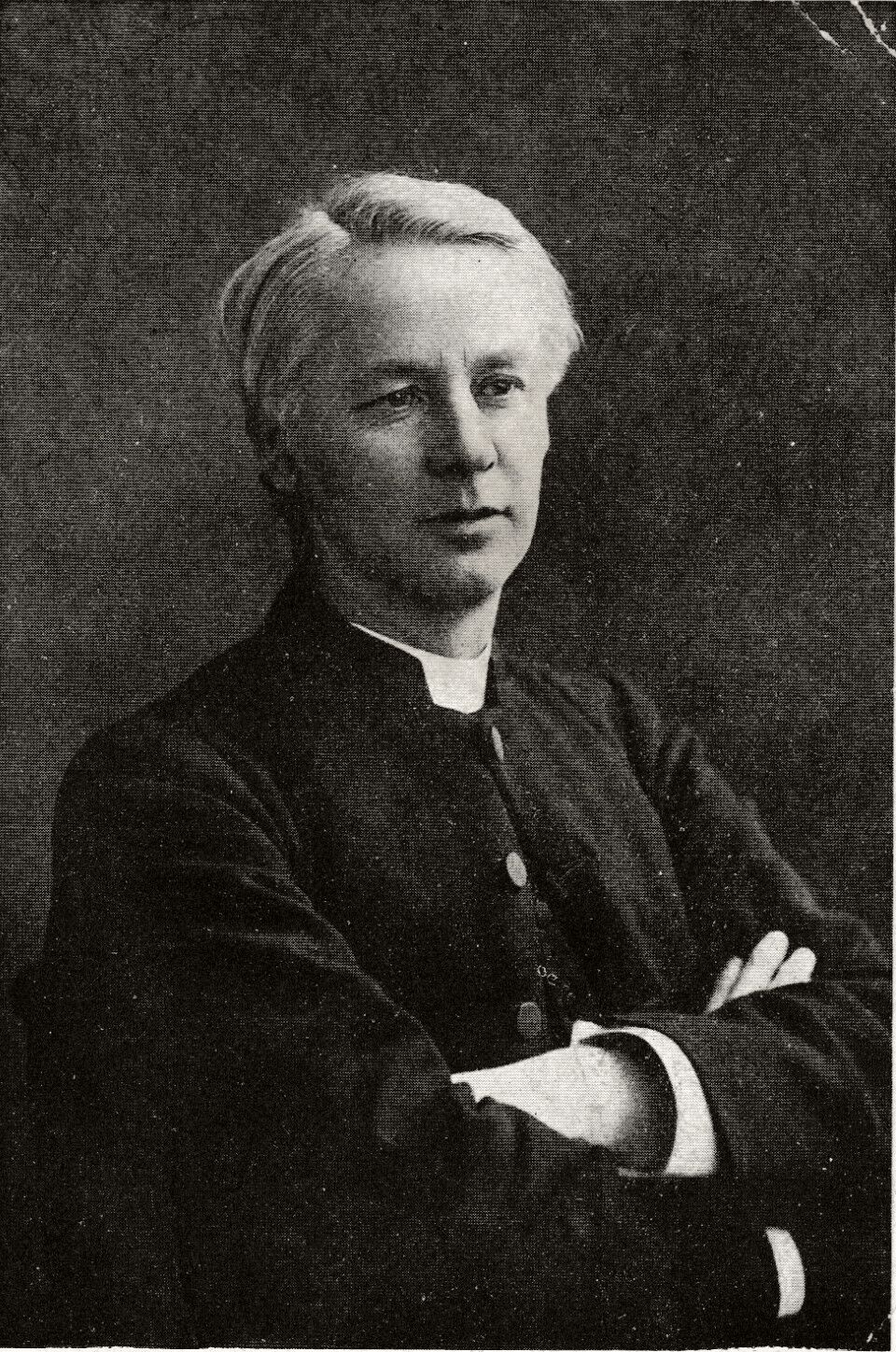
- Province: Canterbury
- Diocese: Gloucester

Personal details
- Born: 23 January 1848 Fawley, Hampshire, England
- Died: 8 March 1924 (aged 76) Fareham, England
- Denomination: Anglican
- Education: Charterhouse; Trinity College, Oxford

Edgar Charles Sumner Gibson (23 January 1848 – 8 March 1924) was the 31st Bishop of Gloucester. He was born into a clerical family. His father was a clergyman and his son Theodore Sumner Gibson was a long serving Bishop in two South African Dioceses. He was educated at Charterhouse and Trinity College, Oxford. Ordained in 1872, his first post was as Chaplain at Wells Theological College, rising to Vice Principal in 1875. His next post was as principal of Leeds Clergy School and he later became Rural Dean of the area and Vicar of Leeds Parish Church.

He was appointed an Honorary Chaplain to Queen Victoria in early January 1901.

In 1905 he was elevated to the episcopate where he remained until his death 19 years later.

His obituary in The Times noted that, "[h]e was an administrator and organizer of remarkable grasp and distinction".

== Family ==
Gibson was born at Fawley, near Southampton, to William Gibson (1804–1862), Rector of Fawley, and Louisanna Sumner (1817–1899), who had a total of 11 children:

- Ella Sophia Gibson (1838–1928)
- Emily Louisa Gibson (1840–1887)
- Ada Frances Gibson (1841–1845)
- Edith Harriet Gibson (1842–1922)
- Arthur Sumner Gibson (1844–1927), a rugby union international, who played in the first international match in 1871
- Herbert William Sumner Gibson (1846–1923), naval officer
- Edgar Charles Sumner Gibson (1848–1924)
- Walter Sumner Gibson (1849–1918), academic reader at Oxford University Press, and uncle (by marriage) of the actor Laurence Olivier
- Rosa Fanny Gibson (1850–1904)
- Florence Jennie Gibson (1853–1911)
- Alan George Sumner Gibson (1856–1922), coadjutor bishop of Cape Town

Gibson's father had previously been married to Eliza Maria Sumner (1808–1836), by whom he had two children:

- Marianne ('May') Gibson (1832–1845)
- John Sumner Gibson (1833–1892), priest and cricketer

Gibson's father's wives were first cousins: Eliza Maria Sumner was the daughter of John Bird Sumner, Archbishop of Canterbury (1848–1862), and Louisanna Sumner's father was Charles Richard Sumner (1790–1874), who served as Bishop of Llandaff (1826–1827) and Bishop of Winchester (1827–1868).

== Written works ==
- Northumbrian Saints (1884)
- Self-discipline (1894)
- Commentary on the Book of Job (1898)
- The Old Testament in The New (1904)
- The Thirty-nine Articles of the Church of England (1908)

Church of England titles
Preceded by Charles Ellicott	Bishop of Gloucester; 1905 – 1924	Succeeded by Arthur Headlam
