= Arthur Gibson (rugby union) =

England international rugby union player

- Born: Arthur Sumner Gibson; 14 July 1844 Fawley, near Southampton
- Died: 23 January 1927 (aged 82)
- School: Marlborough College
- University: Trinity College, Oxford

Rugby union career
- Position: Forward
Senior career
Years	Team	Apps	(Points)
- Manchester Football Club
International career
Years	Team	Apps	(Points)
1871	England	1	

Arthur Sumner Gibson (14 July 1844 – 23 January 1927) was a rugby union international who represented England in 1871 in the first international match.

== Early life ==
Gibson was born at Fawley, near Southampton on 14 July 1844 and baptised there on 11 August 1844. He was the son of priest William Gibson (1804–1862) and his second wife Louisanna Sumner (1817–1899). Louisanna was the eldest daughter of Charles Richard Sumner (1790–1874; who had been the Bishop of Llandaff, 1826–1827, and served as Bishop of Winchester from 1827 to 1868) and Jennie Fanny Barnabine [Maunoir] (1794–1849). She was therefore the niece of Charles' elder brother John Bird Sumner who served as Archbishop of Canterbury from 1848 to 1862. Arthur's father William, had married Arthur's mother in 1837, the year after the death of his first wife Eliza Maria, (1808–1836). Louisanna was in fact the first cousin of William's first wife with Eliza having been the third daughter of John Bird Sumner.

Arthur was born in Fawley, Hampshire where his parents had moved in 1840 and where William became Rector. Arthur had two older half siblings from his father's first marriage: Marianne (May; 1832–1845) and John Sumner (1833–1892). From his father's second marriage Arthur was the eldest son, having four older sisters, Ella Sophia (1838–1928); Emily Louisa (1840–1887); Ada Frances (1841–1893); and Edith Harriet (1842–1922). His mother, having had four daughters in succession then had four sons consecutively, the first of which was Arthur, followed by Herbert William Sumner (1846–1923); Edgar Charles Sumner (1848–1924); and Walter Sumner (1849–1918). Three more children followed, Rosa Fanny (1850–1904); Florence Jennie (1853–1911) and finally Alan George Sumner (1856–1922).

At Arthur's baptism his sponsors were his grandfather, Charles Richard Sumner and his grandmother, Jennie as well as his maternal uncle, Robert. When he was eight months old he, along with all his siblings, caught whooping cough. His older sister May although suffering lightly with whooping cough then caught dropsy and died in October 1845.

Arthur began attending Marlborough College when he was 12 and he was later admitted at Trinity College, Oxford on 11 June 1863 where he received his BA.

== Rugby union career ==
After completing his education he moved to Swinton in Lancashire where he practised as a Civil Engineer. This location gave him the opportunity to play for the Manchester Football Club. Gibson made his international debut on 27 March 1871 at Edinburgh in the Scotland vs England match, the first international rugby match. He was one of four Manchester players to be selected. As with the majority of the side, he was not selected to play for England again, their next game being the following year.

== Later life and career ==
Arthur practised as a Civil Engineer in Lancashire and remained affiliated to the Institution of Civil Engineers until he was 61, in 1905. In 1884 he married Mary Hesketh, whom he had met in Swinton, where she was living with her aunt, Mrs Lempriere. They had three children: Hugh Sumner (1844–1942), who later served in the Indian Forest Service; Percy (Peter) Lemprière (1886–1950) who became a surgeon in the Royal Navy; and Edith Monica (1890–1954) who became a renowned butterfly expert.

Following Arthur's father's death in 1862, his mother, Louisanna, had moved to Farnham, Surrey and then moved again after the death of her father, Bishop Sumner, in 1874, to Blackwater, Hampshire. Arthur, in 1895, chose to be closer to his mother and moved his family down to house in Binfield, roughly nine miles from his mother, which she described in her memoirs as a "great comfort to have him near us." In Binfield, he became the church warden of the parish of St Mark's Church and served as such for over twenty years. On the floor of the church, near to the choir stalls, is a tablet of Cumberland stone in memory of Arthur Sumner Gibson.

Of his siblings, Herbert William Sumner Gibson became a Vice Admiral in the Royal Navy; and Edgar Charles Sumner Gibson became Bishop of Gloucester. His brother, Walter Sumner Gibson became an academic reader at the Oxford University Press from 1914 and his nephew through his wife's youngest brother was the actor Laurence Olivier. Arthur's youngest brother, Alan George Sumner Gibson became the Coadjutor Bishop of Cape Town.
