= James Fellowes (cricketer) =

English cricketer and soldier

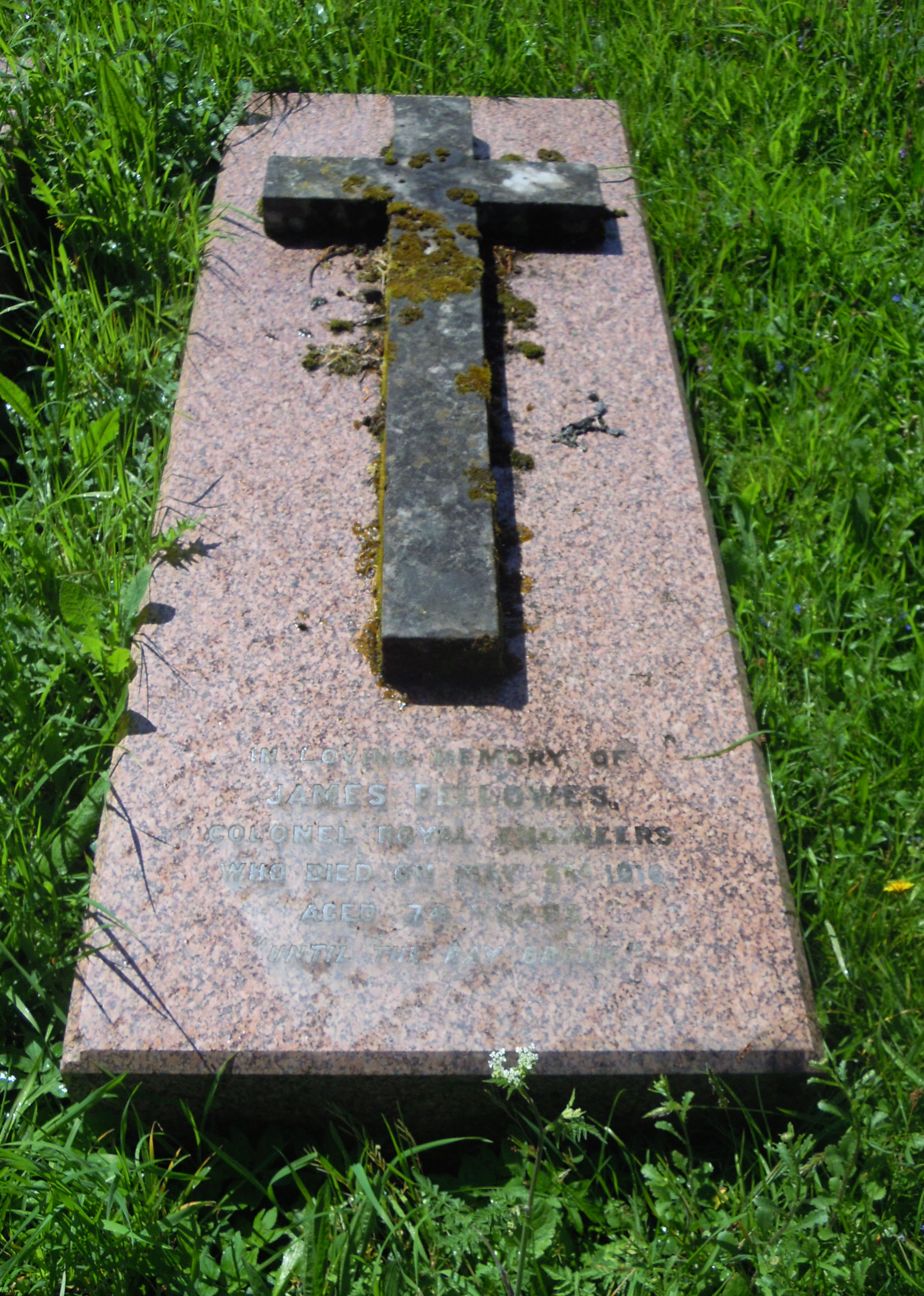
- Grave of James Fellowes in the churchyard at Hale, Surrey

Personal information
- Full name: James Fellowes
- Born: 24 August 1841; Cape of Good Hope, South Africa
- Died: 3 May 1916 (aged 74); Dedham, Essex, England
- Height: 6 ft 1 in (1.85 m)
- Batting: Right-handed
- Bowling: Right-arm roundarm fast
- Relatives: Coote Hedley (son-in-law)

Domestic team information
- Years: Team
- 1870: Marylebone Cricket Club
- 1873–1881: Kent
- 1883–1885: Hampshire

Career statistics
Competition	First-class
Matches	23
Runs scored	432
Batting average	12.34
100s/50s	0/0
Top score	32
Balls bowled	2,708
Wickets	60
Bowling average	18.96
5 wickets in innings	4
10 wickets in match	1
Best bowling	7/24
Catches/stumpings	23/–
- Source: Cricinfo, 7 January 2009

James Fellowes FRAS (21 August 1841 – 3 May 1916) was an English first-class cricketer, cricket administrator, and an officer in the Royal Engineers. As a first-class cricketer, he was mostly associated with Kent County Cricket Club and Hampshire County Cricket Club. At Hampshire, he was joint-secretary alongside Russell Bencraft from 1883 to 1885, later serving as honorary secretary until 1887. He was an important figure in the relocation of Hampshire from the Antelope Ground to the County Ground in Southampton in 1885.

== Early life and military career ==
The son of James Fellowes and his wife, Susan, he was born in the Cape Colony of present-day South Africa in August 1841. Hailing from a military family, Fellowes attended the Royal Military Academy at Woolwich. He graduated from there into the Royal Engineers (RE) as a temporary lieutenant in June 1858, with him gaining the rank in full in 1860. He held the rank of captain by July 1877, at which point he was appointed as an adjutant to the 1st Yorkshire (West Riding) Engineer Volunteers Corps. In September 1879, he was promoted to major, with promotion to lieutenant colonel following in July 1885.

In May 1888, Fellowes was appointed assistant commandant at the Royal School of Military Engineering at Chatham. He was promoted to colonel in July 1889, before vacating his appointment at the school when he was placed on half-pay in July 1890. In February 1891, he was appointed to the staff of the RE until January 1896, remaining on half pay. Fellowes retired from active service in August 1898. Like many RE officers of the Victorian era, he was extensively involved with the Ordnance Survey in Southampton. He was also elected a fellow of the Royal Astronomical Society in 1883.

== Cricket career ==
Fellowes first played cricket for the Royal Engineers Cricket Club in 1868 and joined the Marylebone Cricket Club (MCC) in 1869. It was for the MCC that he made his debut in first-class cricket in 1870, playing against Cambridge University at Lord's; he played a second first-class match for the MCC in the same season, against Gloucestershire. He qualified to play for Kent in 1873, by virtue of being garrisoned at Woolwich. He played first-class cricket for Kent irregularly until 1881, making nine appearances. In these, he took 47 wickets at an average of 14.65, taking four five wicket hauls and ten-wickets in a match once. Noted as being an "exceptionally accurate" right-arm roundarm fast bowler, he took 7 for 24 against Surrey at Maidstone in 1873, while the following season at the same venue he took 6 for 58 and 7 for 42 against Lancashire. While associated with Kent, Fellowes also played one first-class match for a combined Kent and Gloucestershire team against England during the Canterbury Cricket Week of 1874.

While stationed in Southampton with the RE, Fellowes became associated with Hampshire, for whom he played first-class cricket on nine occasions until 1885, when the county lost its first-class status. He was less effective as a bowler for Hampshire, taking 11 wickets at an average of 35.72. He was an important figure at Hampshire, serving as joint-secretary with Russell Bencraft from 1883; he succeeded Bencraft as honorary secretary in 1885, holding that appointment until his resignation in 1887, when his RE duties took him away from Hampshire. During his association with Hampshire, he was instrumental in obtaining a new home ground for the county to replace the Antelope Ground in Southampton. Fellowes made himself the guarantor of the fund to raise money for the acquisition of land for new ground, with him negotiating successfully with the Hulse estate for land on Northlands Road in Southampton. He subsequently oversaw its layout and development. While stationed in Hampshire, he founded the wandering Hampshire Hogs Cricket Club.

Away from first-class cricket, he played the majority of his non-first-class games for the RE, reputedly taking over 1,000 wickets for the regimental team. In his later years he was homorary secretary to Devon, where he supervised the construction of the County Ground in Exeter. In Devon, he founded the wandering Devon Dumplings Cricket Club in 1902.

== Later life ==
Fellowes died suddenly at his Castle House residence in Dedham, Essex on 3 May 1916, aged 74. He is buried in the churchyard of St John the Evangelist at Hale, Surrey. His daughter, Anna, was married to Coote Hedley, who also served in the RE and was a first-class cricketer.
