= John Henry Knight (inventor) =

British inventor and automotive pioneer

- Knight driving "The first petroleum carriage for two people made in England"
- Born: 21 January 1847; Farnham, Surrey, England
- Died: 22 September 1917 (aged 70); Farnham, Surrey, England
- Occupations: Engineer, inventor, vehicle manufacturer
- Years active: Victorian - 1890s
- Known for: 1895 - built the first petroleum carriage for two people made in England

John Henry Knight tricycle

John Henry Knight (21 January 1847 – 8 September 1917), from Farnham, was a wealthy engineer, landowner and inventor. With the help of the engineer George Parfitt he built one of Britain's first petrol-powered motor vehicles, Frederick Bremer of Walthamstow having built the first in 1892. On 17 October 1895, with his assistant James Pullinger, they drove through Farnham, Surrey, whereupon he was prosecuted for using a locomotive with neither a licence nor a man walking in front with a red flag. This is sometimes misreported as the first person to be convicted of speeding in the UK, but that sobriquet subsequently fell to Walter Arnold of East Peckham, Kent, in January 1896. (Note: On 28 January 1896 Walter Arnold, of East Peckham Kent, was fined for speeding at 8 mph (13 km/h), thus exceeding the contemporary speed limit of 2 mph (3.2 km/h). He was fined 1 shilling plus costs, the first speeding fine in England.)

Knight was both an inventor and pioneer, having created successful "Trusty" steam powered standing engine; a (failed) steam powered road vehicle; a renowned steam powered hop digger; a heat saving radiator; a brick laying machine; a grenade thrower, a speedometer, wooden vehicle tyres, and a patent 'dish lever' for tilting plates when carving meat.

Knight was a founder member of the Automobile Association and politically active in the repeal of the Red Flag Act, he was also a pioneer of colour photography, an early adopter of household electricity, plus writing various factual and practical books.

== Family and early life ==
John Henry Knight was born in 1847 to John Coldham Knight, a banker and brewer of Farnham, who died in 1856 when John Henry was 9 years old. His mother was Mary Knight [nee Crump]. His father's will bequeathed him title to, among other things, 'The Anchor Inn, Normandy' when he was 21 years old. He was born and raised at Weybourne House, Weybourne, Farnham, Surrey, which still stands today. He then moved to Barfield in Runfold, just outside Farnham, which is now a Preparatory school (whose alumni include Mike Hawthorn).

He was inspired by The Great Exhibition of 1851 and went on to train as an engineer, developing an early enthusiasm for steam powered road-going transport. He owned an engineering works on West Street, Farnham.

== Early motoring ==
Britain's First Motoring Summons sent to James Pullinger on 23 October 1895, stated: "Information has been laid this day by William Harrington Buyans a Police Officer for that you on the seventeenth day of October one thousand eight hundred and ninety-five at Farnham in the County aforesaid, then being in charge of a locomotive did cause the same to pass on a certain highway there situate called Castle Street, between the hours of ten o'clock in the forenoon and six o'clock in the afternoon, to wit at thirty minutes past three in the afternoon of the same day in contravention of a certain Bye Law duly made pursuant to the Highways and Locomotives Act 1848 by the Quarter Sessions of the Peace of the said County, contrary to the statute in such case made and provided.

You are therefore hereby summoned to appear before the Court of Summary Jurisdiction, sitting at the Town Hall, Farnham, on Thursday, the 31st day of October, 1895, at the hour of twelve at noon, to answer to the said information."

— British Local History. The First Motor Offender

In 1895 Knight built one of Britain's first petrol-powered motor vehicles, a three-wheeled, two-seater contraption with a top speed of only 8 mph (13 km/h). It was "The first petroleum carriage for two people made in England" and believed to be the fourth British vehicle to be built plus the 'first petrol driven vehicle ever to be driven on British roads'.

Sources such as British Local History state that:

The car was designed very much as an experiment in order to attract police attention and therefore create public awareness of the many restrictions which prevented the use of motor carriages in Britain at that time. Knight managed to use the vehicle for some 150 miles (240 km) on public roads, before being stopped by the Police.

On 17 October 1895 Knight's assistant, James Pullinger, was stopped in Castle Street, Farnham, by the Superintendent of Police and a crowd had gathered by the time Knight arrived. Knight was advised by his lawyer to admit liability for not having a licence for the vehicle. He and Pullinger were charged with using a locomotive without a licence. The case was heard at 'Farnham Petty Sessions' held at Farnham Town Hall on 31 October 1895. Knight and Pullinger were both fined half a crown 2s 6d (or possibly 5 shillings) plus 10 shillings costs (or possibly 12s 6d). Knight largely restricted the use of the car to farm roads until the Locomotives on Highways Act 1896 created a new class of vehicles weighing less than 3 tons to which bye-laws imposed under the Highways and Locomotives (Amendment) Act 1878 did not apply. His action contributed to the movement for the repeal of the notorious Red Flag legislation.

Knight's vehicle was said to be "almost silent" when it was running; the vehicle entered a limited production run in 1896 and shortly after that the tricycle was the only British car at the 1896 Horseless Carriage display at The Crystal Palace, although the design was later changed in favour of a four-wheel version. The car is currently on display at the National Motor Museum.

Knight was a founder member of the Automobile Club of Great Britain, so the members first ever 'club run' was hosted at his Barfield home.

== Other inventions and pioneering activities ==
John Henry Knight Steam vehicle, circa 1868

Although best remembered for his car and his driving, he had, for many years, been an inventor and a designer of steam-powered machines, which he used for agricultural work and early road transport.

=== Steam powered road vehicle ===
In 1868 he built a steam powered road vehicle, although it was not a practical proposition due to inefficiency.

John Henry Knight's steam powered hop digging machine, circa 1872

=== Steam powered hop digging machine ===
In 1872 Knight developed a steam powered hop digging machine. A rival designer, Frank Proctor, stated in an 1890 edition of the weekly magazine "Engineering" that "Mr Knight has undoubtedly earned the distinction of being one of the early pioneers in the system of steam digging". He had begun developing his first digging machine in 1872, specifically for working in hopfields, which are difficult to cultivate due to the incidence of the hop poles which support the strings up which the plants climb. "Digging by Steam" by Colin Tyler (published in 1977 by Argus Books Ltd) devotes a chapter to hop digging machines, many of which were designed and built by Knight, and which are illustrated with drawings or photos.

=== Other inventions ===
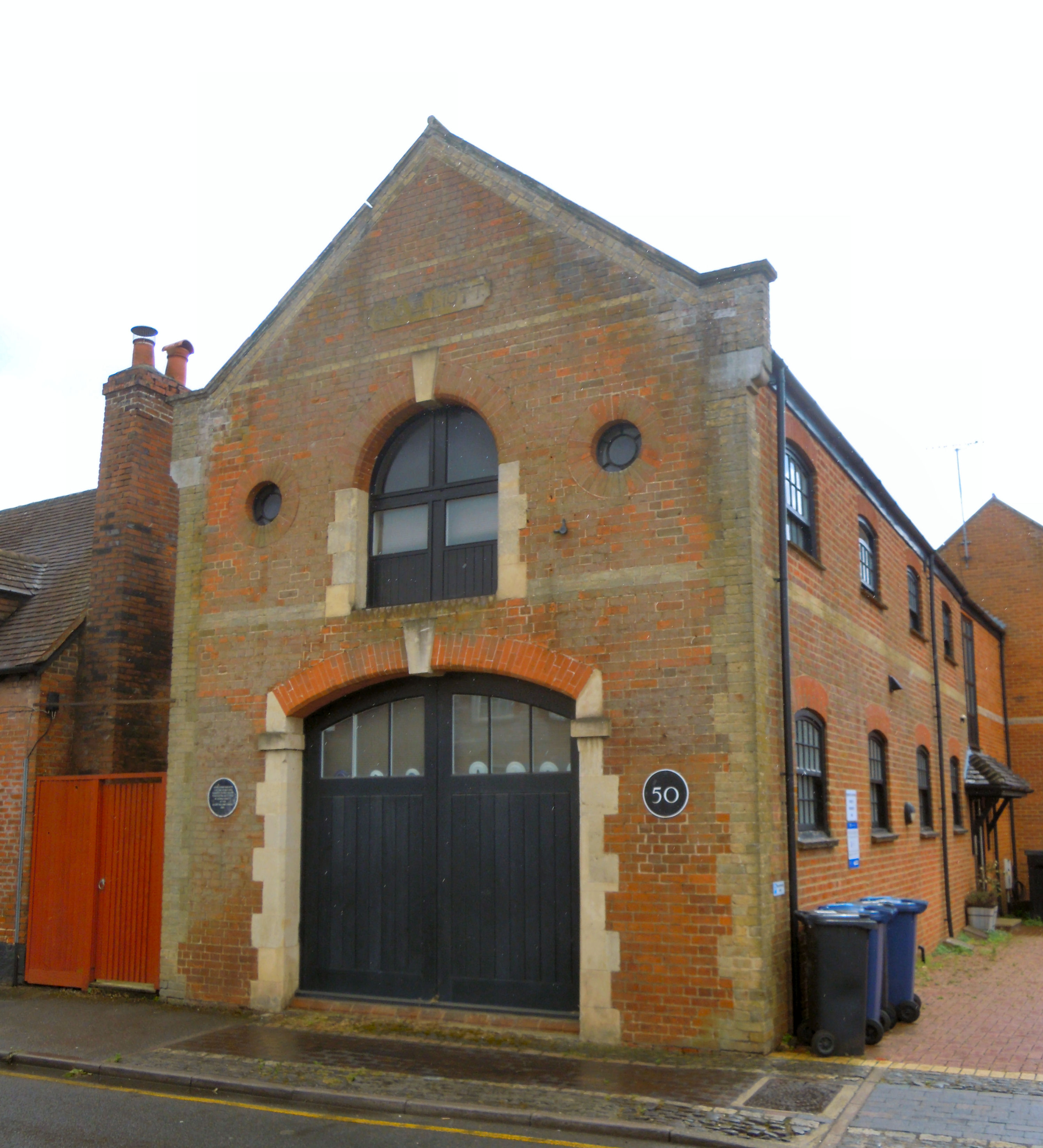
The former Elliot Works on Farnham's West Street where Knight's petrol driven vehicle was built in 1895

His other inventions included -

- Knight's Thermosote Heat Saving Radiator, for which patents were applied for;
- a brick laying machine; a wall that it built still stands at Barfield School in Runfold, but the machine's main flaw was an inability to turn/build corners.
- a grenade thrower,
- a speedometer,
- wooden vehicle tyres,
- Knight's patent 'dish lever' for tilting plates when carving meat.

=== Photography ===
He was a keen photographer and pioneer of early colour photography, photographing Farnham and the surrounding countryside in the early years of the 20th century.

=== Writing ===
His publications included:

- Electric Light for Country Houses
- Reminiscences of a Country Town
- Notes on Motor Carriages with Hints for Purchasers and Users. Published 1896, Hazell, Watson & Viney, Ltd. London
- A Catechism of the Motor Car, Containing about 320 Questions and Answers Explaining the Construction and Working of a Modern Motor Car. For the Use of Owners, Drivers, and Students. By John Henry Knight.
- Light Motor Cars and Voiturettes, A 1902 book reflecting light cars and motoring of the time. By John Henry Knight.

== Commemoration ==
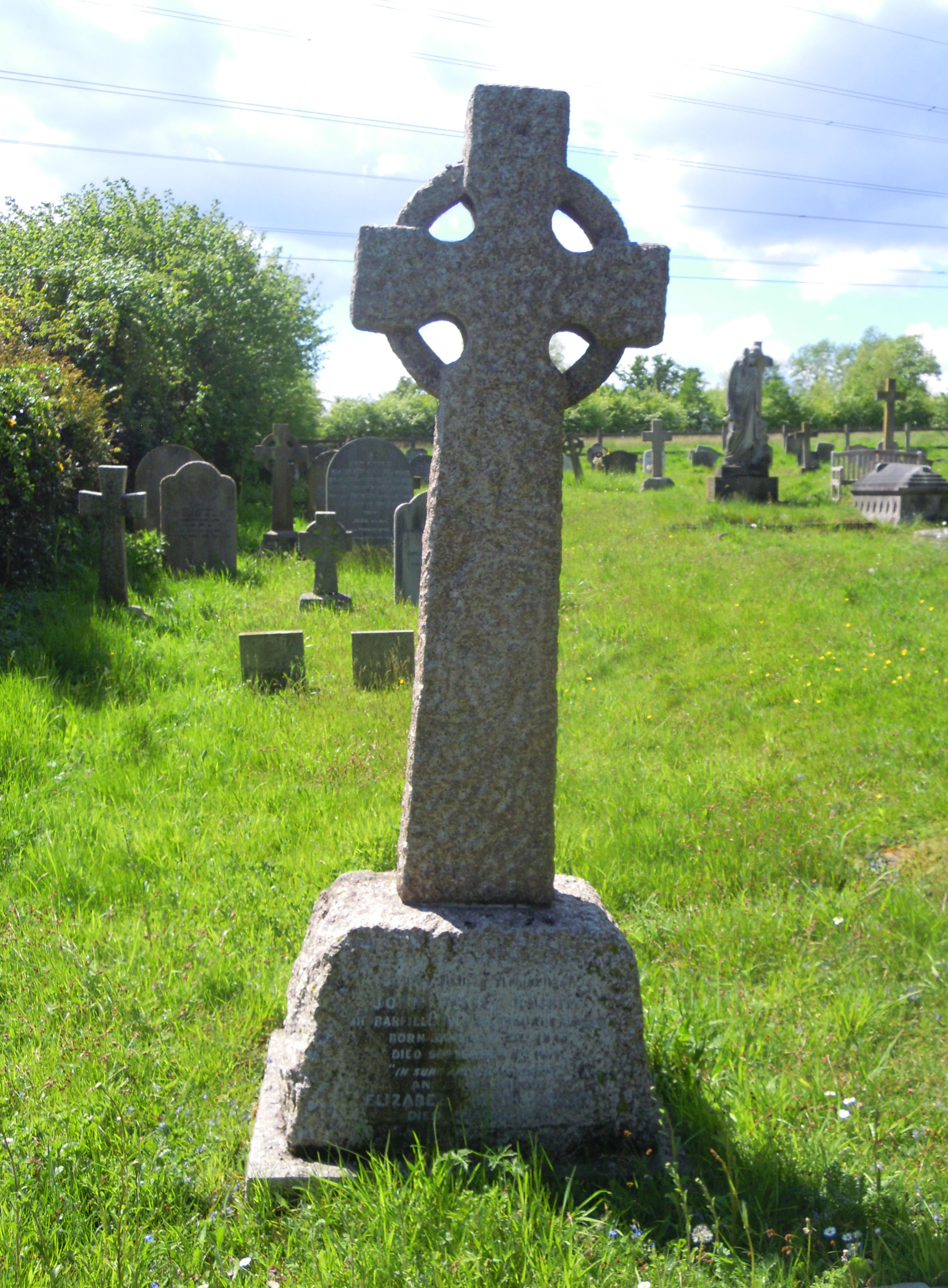
The grave of John Henry Knight at Hale, Surrey

Knight died in September 1917 and is buried in St John's churchyard in Hale, north east of Farnham in Surrey. A black plaque on the wall of the old works at West Street, Farnham commemorates John Henry Knight's achievement. It says

John Henry Knight's car, one of Britain's earliest petrol driven vehicles, was built here by George Parfitt at the Elliot Reliance Works. 1895

== See also ==
- Frederick Bremer
