= Badshot Lea =

Village in Surrey, England

Coordinates: 51°14′N 0°46′W

- Village
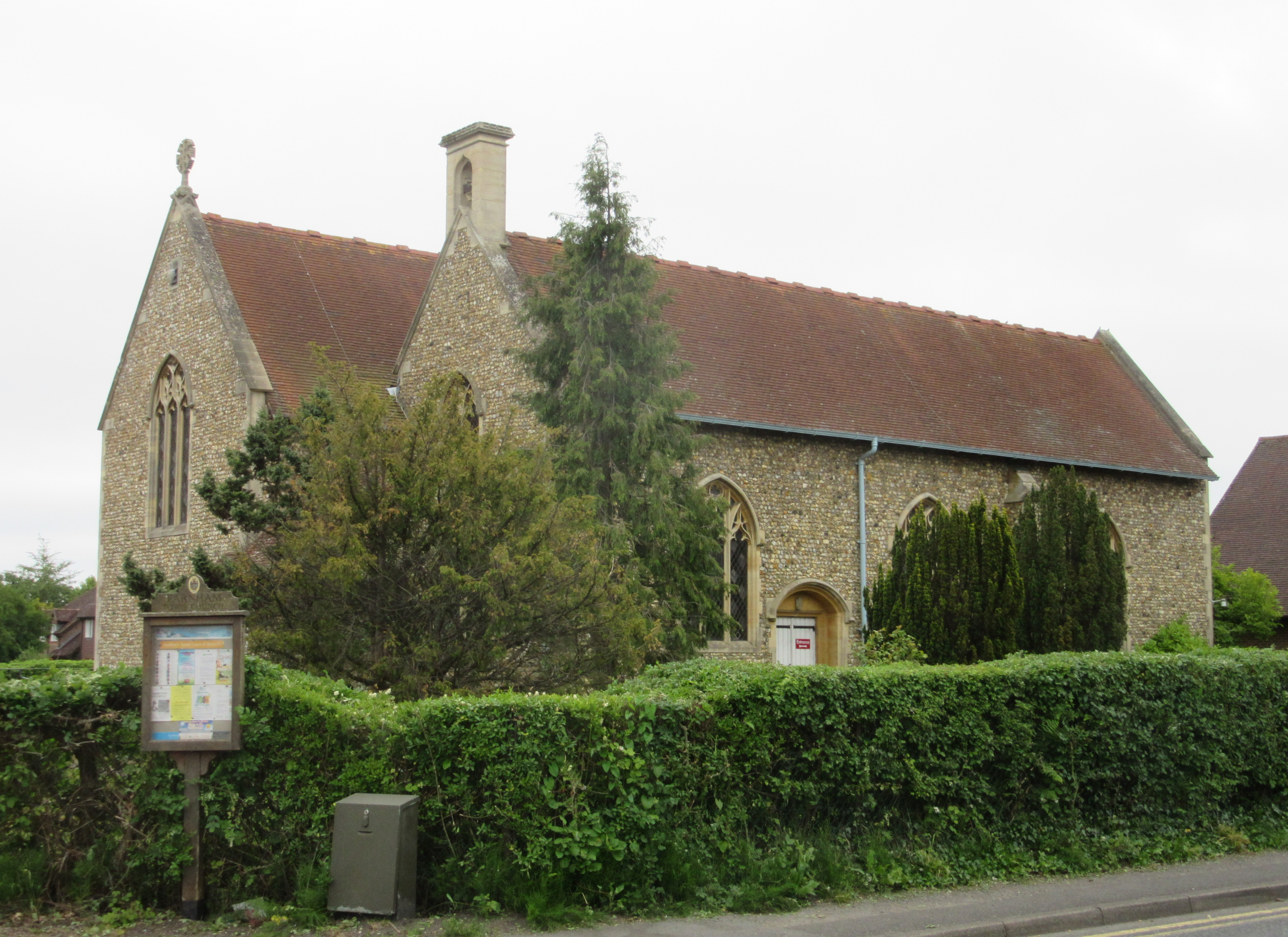
- St Georges church

- Location within Surrey
- Population: 1,509 (2011 Ward)
- OS grid reference: SU865489
- District: Waverley
- Shire county: Surrey
- Region: South East
- Country: England
- Sovereign state: United Kingdom
- Post town: Farnham
- Postcode district: GU9
- Dialling code: 01252
- Police: Surrey
- Fire: Surrey
- Ambulance: South East Coast
- UK Parliament: Farnham and Bordon

Badshot Lea is a village in Surrey, England, close to Aldershot. Badshot Lea has access in either direction to the A31 and A331 and is connected to railway stations in the nearby towns with regular bus services. The village is part of the Blackwater Valley or Aldershot Urban Area, the thirtieth largest conurbation in the UK. Badshot Lea's boundaries are four bridges—three western railway bridges and Pea Bridge over the uppermost part of the River Blackwater— these inspired a logo for the village and the football team who play in the larger neighbouring village of Ash. The Blackwater separates Badshot Lea from Aldershot to the north; the eastern and western boundaries are short and the southern boundary is the A331.

== History ==
In prehistory mammoths were in the area now encompassed by the village boundaries, evidenced by the Mammoth tusks occasionally excavated by Surrey Archaeological Society.

The village has remains in, or close to, the village from the Mesolithic, Neolithic, Iron Age, Roman and medieval periods. In 1967 the Badshot Lea Village school master and amateur archaeologist William (Billy) Rankine discovered the remains of a Neolithic Long Barrow (burial mound also known as a tumulus) here. The site was excavated by the Surrey Archaeological Society and many finds are on display at Guildford Museum. Little remains of the original mound due to quarrying and the excavation of the Railway cutting in the 1800s. The burial mound was sited close to the Harrow Way. The village used to be surrounded by thriving farms, with a particular focus on hop growing; these played such an important role in the economic development of the village that hops feature in the village logo.

The eastern end of the village has suffered terrible flooding. This led to the road near the Aldershot boundary being nicknamed the 'docks'.

Badshot Lea is close to the GHQ Line pill box fortifications built during World War II to defend London in the event of a successful German invasion of Britain in Operation Sea Lion. An example can still be found behind the rifle range.

== Politics ==
=== Local ===
Badshot Lea has a Community Association (BLCA) but has no civil parish. Badshot Lea is represented by Chris Jackman (Farnham Residents) and Mark Merryweather (LibDem) at Farnham Town Council, and at Waverley Borough Council by two councillors: Andy MacLeod (Farnham Residents) and Mark Merryweather (LibDem) as part of the Badshot Lea and Moor Park ward. Of the 81 single-member electoral divisions of Surrey County Council Badshot Lea is in Farnham North, represented by Catherine Powell (Farnham Residents).

=== National ===
Badshot Lea is part of the Farnham and Bordon constituency, and the MP is Gregory Stafford MP (Conservative) as of the July 2024 election.

== Transport ==
Badshot Lea lies on the A31 and so has links to Guildford, London, and south to Portsmouth. It lies at the southern tip of the A331 (the Blackwater Valley Route) which connects the village to Farnborough and Camberley. Bus services are provided by Stagecoach and Fleet Buzz. There are links to Farnham, Aldershot, Guildford, Elstead, and Hale. Badshot Lea is equidistant from Aldershot and Farnham Railway stations. The nearest airport for business passengers is Farnborough Airport. The nearest major airport is London Heathrow Airport which is 31 miles (50 km) by road. Gatwick Airport and Southampton Airport are each about 43 miles (69 km) away by main roads.

== Amenities ==
=== Educational and general ===
The village is home to Badshot Lea Village Infant School, a nursery, "the Kiln" village hall (built in 1886), a Community Garden (located at The Kiln) run by the Badshot Lea Bloomers, Badshot Lea Big Pond fishing lake, an electrical substation, a sewage treatment facility, T.S. Swiftsure Sea Cadet centre, St George's C of E Church and hall, a cemetery, a pond-dipping stage, an animal sanctuary, a working men's club and two pubs/inns, The Cricketers and The Crown. There is a large garden centre with an aquatic department and cafe. Formally known as 'Badshot Lea Garden Centre' and owned by the Caffyn Parsons family, it was taken over by Squires in 2006. Its extensive pets and aquatics centre was opened in 1999 by Charlie Dimmock.

=== The Bishop Sumner Educational Foundation ===
Young people in the village in full-time education can apply for grants from the Bishop Sumner Educational Foundation.

=== Sports and open spaces ===
Sports include a pavilion for football and cricket, two tennis courts, a cricket club, cricket nets, indoor and outdoor shooting ranges, a riding school, an equestrian centre, a dog agility club, two fishing ponds, a model car club with outdoor racing track, Badshot Lea Football Club, four geocaches, and several children's playgrounds.

The village has green buffers to all sides but the north, intersected by paths. The north has a buffer which is pond named the King's Pond, separating it from Aldershot in a salient part of Hampshire.

Badshot Lea is also home to part of Tice’s Meadow Nature Reserve. This beautiful wildlife area near Farnham is widely considered to be one of the best inland sites to watch birds in the southeast of England.

== Economy ==
=== Quarries ===
Areas to the east and south of the village have been exploited for sand and gravel extraction. One former quarry, operated by Hanson UK between the mid-1990s and 2010, was reopened as the 55 ha (140-acre) Tice's Meadow nature reserve by the Mayor of Farnham in 2018.

== Landmarks ==
=== St George's Church ===
Badshot Lea has a parish church in stonemasonry, named after St George. The Foundation Stone was laid on 23 August 1902 by the Lord Lieutenant of Surrey, Viscount Middleton. The stone can still be seen today, at the West end of the church. A year later the church was completed and was consecrated on 24 October 1903 by the Bishop of Winchester.

Following the demolition of the Old Parsonage, and construction of a new Vicarage in 1999, the funds released were used for the further development of the church. The Southern aisle of the church was not completed with the rest of the building. In 1999 a new Church Room was added, and opened on 10 October 1999 by Rt. Rev. John Gladwin, Bishop of Guildford.

The church's memorials include:

- Elizabeth Allen — Treasurer of the Badshot Lea Mothers' Union and Women's Fellowship
- Sarah Emmerson — Headmistress of Badshot Lea Infant School
- Thomas Kitchin
- William Garrett — Royal Navy

The church is part of the Church of England Parish of Badshot Lea and Hale and works in unison with the churches of St John the Evangelist Church, Hale, Surrey and St Mark the Evangelist Church, Upper Hale, Farnham. In turn this is in the Deanery of Farnham, part of the Diocese of Guildford. The church is closely linked to the 45-strong SATB choir, the Carillon Singers.

The church is active in village life and hosts an annual village fair, a Remembrance service, and a community carol concert.

== Crime ==
In the year ending September 2024, the crime rate in Waverley was lower than the average crime rate across similar areas.

Notable crimes in the village include a cannabis factory (2009), an attack on a horse, and distraction burglaries.

== Climate ==
Badshot Lea has a temperate maritime climate, free from extreme temperatures, with moderate rainfall and often breezy conditions. The nearest official weather station to Badshot Lea is Alice Holt Lodge. The highest temperature recorded was 35.4 °C (95.7 °F), in July 2006. In an 'average' year, the warmest day would reach 29.1 °C (84.4 °F), with 15.2 days attaining a temperature of 25.1 °C (77.2 °F) or higher. The lowest temperature recorded was −14.0 °C (6.8 °F) in February 1986. On average, 58.6 nights of the year will register an air frost. Annual rainfall averages 799mm, with at least 1mm of rain reported on 122.4 days. All averages refer to the 1971–2000 observation period.

== Famous residents ==
Notable former residents of Badshot Lea include

- Lieutenant-Commander William Armstrong D.S.M. – Airman who initiated the hunt for the World War II Nazi Germany battleship Bismarck.
- Lance Corporal Alan Davis – Bomb disposal expert
