= Weybourne LNR =

Nature reserve in Surrey, England

Coordinates: 51.229°N 0.778°W

Weybourne
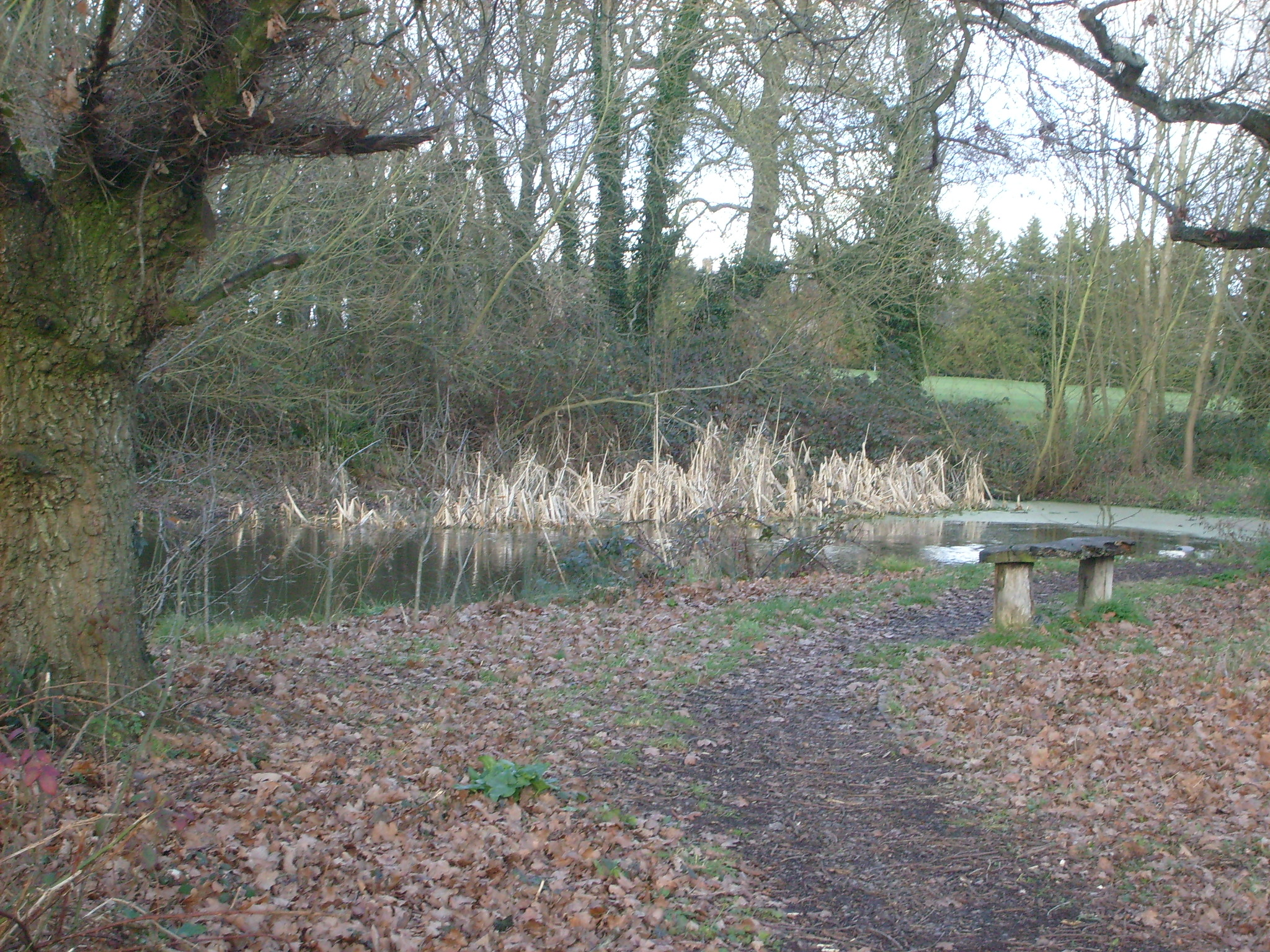
- Interactive map of Weybourne
- Type: Local Nature Reserve
- Location: Weybourne, Surrey
- OS grid: SU 854 485
- Area: 2.4 hectares (5.9 acres)
- Manager: Waverley Borough Council

Weybourne LNR is a 2.4-hectare (5.9-acre) Local Nature Reserve on the southern outskirts of Weybourne in Surrey. It is owned and managed by Waverley Borough Council.

This site has a variety of habitats, including woodland, grassland, fen and scrub.

There is access from Weybourne Road.
