= Henry Newcome (British Army officer) =

British Army general

Major-General Henry Newcome CB CMG DSO
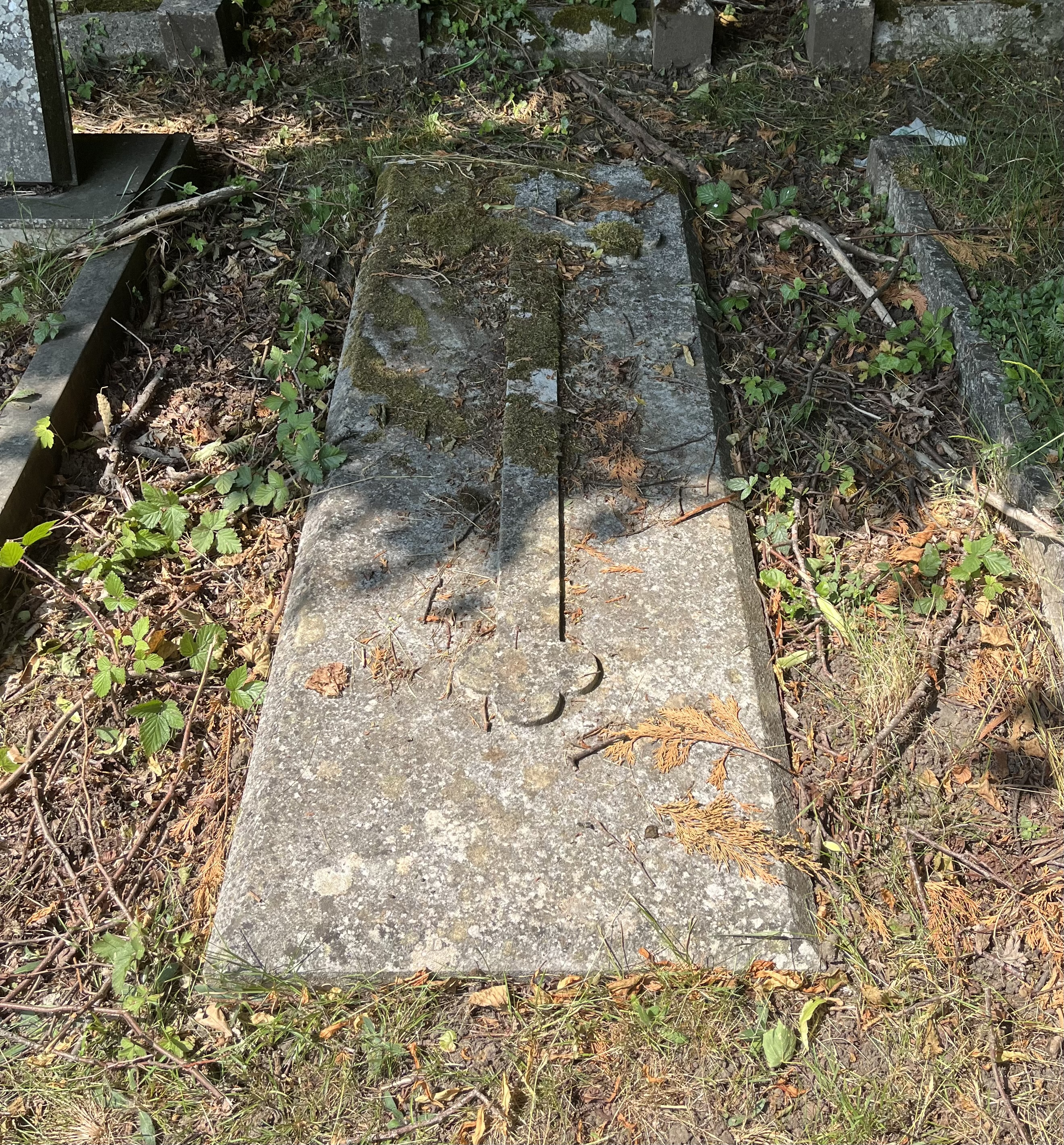
- The grave of Henry William Newcome in Upper Hale Cemetery in Farnham in Surrey
- Born: 14 July 1875; Hilsea, Hampshire
- Died: 25 February 1963 (aged 87)
- Military career
- Allegiance: United Kingdom
- Branch: British Army
- Rank: Major-General
- Commands: Royal School of Artillery; Baluchistan District; 50th (Northumbrian) Division
- Conflicts: Second Boer War; First World War
- Awards: Companion of the Order of the Bath; Companion of the Order of St Michael and St George; Distinguished Service Order

Major-General Henry William Newcome, CB, CMG, DSO (14 July 1875 – 25 February 1963) was a British Army officer.

== Early life ==
Newcome was the oldest of six children of Major Henry George Newcome RA (1846–1895) and Sibylla Caroline Dale (1843–1932), later of the Manor House in Aldershot in Hampshire.

== Military career ==
Newcome was commissioned into the Royal Artillery and saw action in South Africa during the Second Boer War.

He was promoted from supernumerary captain to captain in January 1905.

He served on the Western Front in the First World War, which began in the summer of 1914, with the Royal Field Artillery for which he was appointed a Companion of the Distinguished Service Order (DSO). The citation for his DSO appeared in The London Gazette in April 1915 and reads as follows:

For the excellent work performed throughout the campaign, especially on the 10th and 11th March, 1915, during the action at Givenchy, when he directed the fire of his Battery from a ruined house with great skill whilst exposed to very heavy rifle fire. The reports furnished by Major Newcome during the engagement were of the greatest value.

He was seconded from his regiment and served as a general staff officer, grade 2 from August 1915. He was then the brigadier general, Royal Artillery in the 21st Division from May 1917 to November 1918. In January 1918 he was made a brevet colonel.

After the war he succeeded Brigadier-General William Basil Browell as Commandant of the Chapperton Down Artillery School in November 1918, became Commander, Royal Artillery at Northern Command in April 1923 and, promoted to major general in March 1927, General Officer Commanding Baluchistan District in India in March 1931. He went on to be Major-General, Royal Artillery for the Indian Army in February 1933 and then General Officer Commanding the 50th (Northumbrian) Division from April 1928 until he relinquished this position on 20 February 1931 and retired from the army.

He was appointed a Companion of the Order of St Michael and St George in the 1919 New Year Honours and Companion of the Order of the Bath in the 1923 New Year Honours.

He was buried in Upper Hale Cemetery in Farnham in Surrey.

== Bibliography ==
- Snowden, K. L. (2001). British 21st Infantry Division on the Western Front 1914–1918: A Case Study in Tactical Evolution (PDF) (PhD). Department of Modern History School of Historical Studies: Birmingham University. OCLC 690664905.

Military offices
Preceded by Sir George Cory	GOC 50th (Northumbrian) Division; 1928–1931	Succeeded by Richard Pope-Hennessy
