= Runfold =

Coordinates: 51°13′14″N 0°45′14″W

- Village
- Location within Surrey
- OS grid reference: SU871476
- District: Waverley
- Shire county: Surrey
- Region: South East
- Country: England
- Sovereign state: United Kingdom
- Post town: Farnham
- Postcode district: GU10
- Dialling code: 01252
- Police: Surrey
- Fire: Surrey
- Ambulance: South East Coast
- UK Parliament: Farnham and Bordon

Runfold is a village in Surrey, U.K., about 2 mi (3.2 km) ENE of Farnham.

Runfold lies on the ancient trackway known as the Pilgrims' Way and on the former route of the A31 road, which has by-passed the village since the early 1990s. Loss of through traffic has made the village safer and quieter but has affected the village economy, with the loss of the service station, post office and "Alf's Café", a notable transport café. One pub remains; the Princess Royal, which also offers accommodation; the former Jolly Farmer is now a Chinese restaurant.

The village has been affected by mineral extraction, subsequent infilling of the resultant sand and gravel pits, and the heavy vehicle movements associated with that industry.

Runfold Manor is a large house in the east of the village, at the foot of the Hog's Back. Much of the contents were auctioned in 2005 when the owners decided to move away.

John Henry Knight, a former resident of Barfield House in the village, built "The first petroleum carriage for two people made in England". Barfield School, an independent mixed Primary School, is now located there; Mike Hawthorn, Britain's first Formula One motor racing World Champion was educated here.

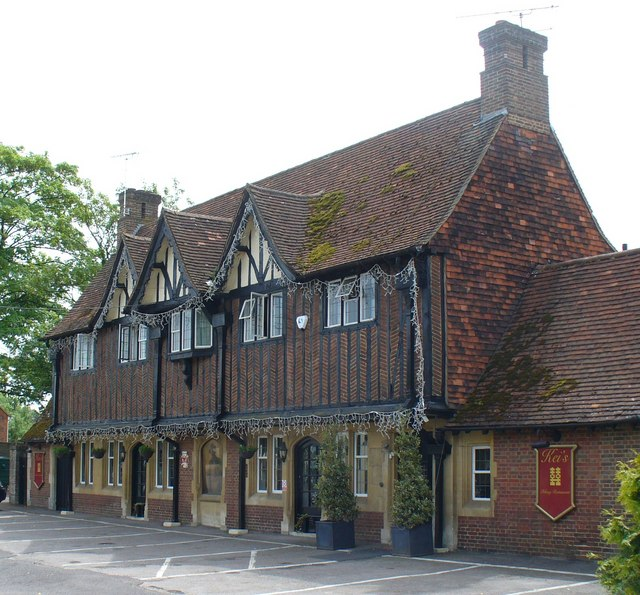
Kei's Beijing Restaurant

Runfold, along with a number of other villages in the Surrey and Sussex Weald (such as Alfold, Dunsfold, Durfold, Kingsfold and Chiddingfold) comprise the "Fold Villages", the suffix probably relating to the clearance of forest and its use as pasturage for sheep or cattle in Saxon times.
