= St Mark the Evangelist Church, Upper Hale, Farnham =

St Mark the Evangelist, Upper Hale
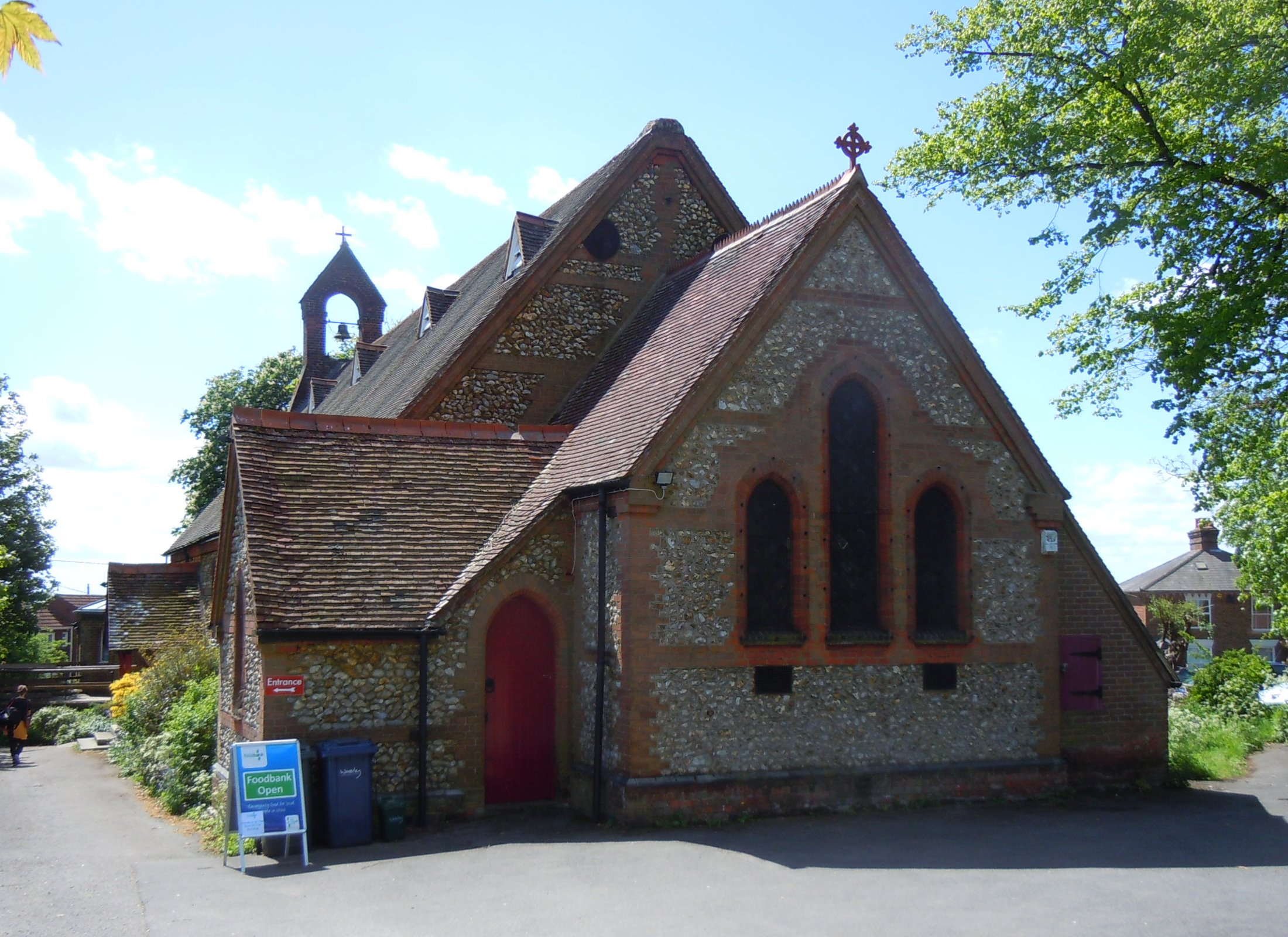
- St Mark the Evangelist
- St Mark the Evangelist, Upper Hale
- 51.235075°N 0.800314°W
- Location: Alma Lane, Upper Hale, Surrey, GU9 9RP
- Country: England
- Denomination: Church of England
- Churchmanship: Liberal Catholic
- Website: badshotleaandhale.org/

History
- Status: Active
- Dedication: Mark the Evangelist
- Dedicated: 14 July 1883

Architecture
- Functional status: Parish church
- Heritage designation: Grade II
- Designated: 10 December 2021
- Architect: A.R.Barker
- Construction cost: £1200

Administration
- Diocese: Diocese of Guildford
- Archdeaconry: Archdeaconry of Surrey
- Deanery: Farnham
- Parish: Badshot Lea and Hale

Clergy
- Rector: The Rev'ds Alan and Lesley Crawley

St Mark the Evangelist Church is a Church of England parish church in Upper Hale, Surrey. It is a red brick structure, fairfaced inside and out, with an aisle-less nave and small chancel adorned with a "fine" and "original" set of murals by local artist Kitty Milroy. The church was consecrated in 1883.

== History ==
St Mark's is a daughter church to St John the Evangelist Church, Hale, Surrey. The church was built largely due to the efforts of the Vicar of Hale, John Powell, encouraged by many parishioners, tradition has it that the locals collected flints from the common to build the walls. The parishioners of the larger houses in Hale worshipped at St John's but the servants couldn't attend because they were working at that time. St John's was at the southernmost edge of the parish and the servants were too scared to walk in the dark. Consequently, the vicar started services for the servants at the local school. When the congregation had grown large it was clear that another church was needed in the parish.

St Mark's was dedicated by the Bishop of Winchester Harold Browne on 14 July 1883, the eve of St Swithun's Day, and the first communion was on the following day. Hence, the Centenary Window depicts St Swithun. The newspaper article at the time reported on the opening of St Mark's Mission Church parish writing it was situated in "a very poor and populous part of the parish of Hale, some little distance from St John the Evangelist, which for a considerable time has been felt to be totally inadequate to the requirements of the district."

The church was granted Grade II listed status in December 2021.

== Interior features ==
Tudor Altar

The altar is Tudor in style and has an inscription "GIVEN BI HENRIE LVNNE 1608", 275 years before St Mark's was built. It is believed to have come from St Andrew's Church, Farnham, as an article from the Surrey Advertiser on 4 December 1880 says:

"A working party of ladies in Farnham have presented a new altar to the Parish Church. This, with a new altar cloth, was placed in the church on St Andrew’s Day, Nov. 20th. The old altar and altar cloth have been accepted by the Vicar of Hale for the use of a church which it is intended to begin next year at Hale Common."

Pipe Organ

Initially the singing in the church was accompanied by a harmonium. But thanks to a legacy from a local woman, Emily Mangles, a pipe organ was installed on All Saints' Day 1912. The organ was built by Samuel Frederick Dalladay of Hastings, it is a good and early example of his smaller organs, well built and tonally pleasant. Some later work was undertaken on it at a later date by George Osmond, but it remains a largely authentic instrument. The organ is affectionately known as "Emily".

Wall Paintings

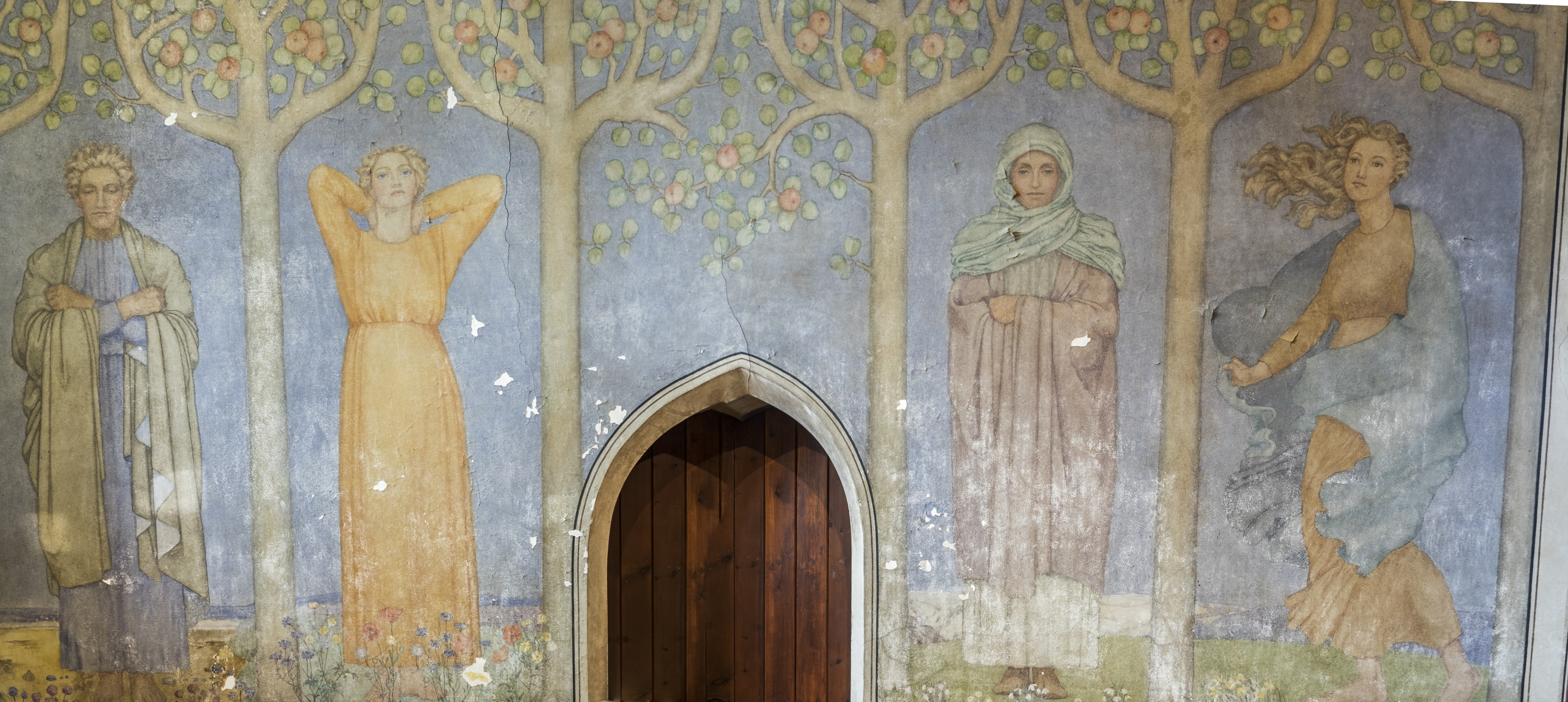
Wall paintings by Kitty Milroy

The sanctuary is adorned with a wall painting scheme executed between about 1911 and 1920 by a local artist, Kitty Milroy. Her work is exceptional for a number of reasons:

- Milroy's idiosyncratic paintings illustrate the Annunciation and the Benedicite. In the latter, monumental figures personify seasonal attributes; at dado level, painted roundels include representations of local scenes and views. Imaginatively conceived and executed, blending influences from European Symbolist painting and the Arts and Crafts Movement.
- Kitty Milroy's paintings stand at a critical point in the stylistic and technical development of mural practice in England, and have considerable local and national importance. She was unusual in persisting with the complex spirit fresco technique into the 20th century. Kitty Milroy's artistic and technical skill are considerable, and examination and analysis of her scheme shows that she availed herself of the wide range of pigments that were available in the early 20th century.

A conservation project to restore the wall paintings began in 2021 and a plaque honouring Milroy was erected in South Street, Farnham, in September 2023.

Stained Glass

In around 1955, two stained glass windows were installed, depicting St Mary and St Agnes. The first of the two came from the chapel of the Mary Yolland Children's Home, about half a mile down the road from the church in Yolland Close. A third, showing St Mark was added some years later. It was made by John Blyth (1915 – 99), of Markinch in Fife, Scotland who signed his work by incorporating a small bumble bee. He was apprentice to the famous glass maker, William Wilson (artist). The window contains a piece of red, sixteenth century, semi-precious glass in the centre of the bible which St Mark is holding.

Choir Vestry

The Choir Vestry, measuring 22 ft (6.7 m) by 12 ft (3.7 m) was built by members of the congregation for a total cost of £400. It was dedicated by Augustine Studdert, archdeacon of Surrey, on 1 February 1959.

Centenary Window

As a permanent thanksgiving for a hundred years of worship at St Mark's Church the Parochial Church Council commissioned John Blyth of Markinch in Fifeshire, Scotland to produce a stained-glass window of St Swithun of Winchester to be placed in the window immediately to the right of the main entrance.

St Swithun is depicted in Eucharistic vestments and mitre holding his crozier. At his feet can be seen a view of the West End of Winchester Cathedral - Recalling the legends surrounding St Swithun there is the water of the River Itchen underneath the saint and at his head a rainbow. In the border of the window are symbols of the Holy Trinity to whom Winchester Cathedral is dedicated.

The subject was chosen to remember that the church was dedicated by the then Bishop of Winchester on 14 July 1883 -the Eve of St Swithun's Day — whilst the first celebration of Holy Communion was on St Swithun's Day.

This was the seventh window produced by John Blyth in the parish.

Bells

Initially there was one bell, but later two others were added, and the three were affectionately known as "Tom, Dick and Harry". During the First World War they were rung every lunchtime as a call to prayer for those fighting. Two became cracked and then the clapper failed on the third, so they were taken to John Taylor & Co's smeltery where they were resmelted into a single bell.

== Present day ==
St Mark the Evangelist is part of the Parish of Badshot Lea and Hale in the Diocese of Guildford. The church stands in the Liberal Catholic tradition of the Church of England.

Services include Sunday 11:00am Informal Worship and Friday noon Communion Service.

The church is committed to being environmentally friendly and has an Eco Church award, it also is committed to welcoming and including everyone, embracing people of different race, sexuality, gender, physical and mental disabilities and wealth or poverty and is listed as an Inclusive Church.

== List of incumbents ==
- 1879-1891 John Powell
- 1891-1894 Robert Brown
- 1894-1910 G.E. Hitchcock
- 1910-1914 Alan M. Watson
- 1914-1917 H.D. Birley
- 1917-1923 John du V. Brunton
- 1923-1926 Bernard Woodard
- 1926-1930 E. Logan-Hunter
- 1930-1941 J.L.R Pastfield
- 1941-1944 R.H.C. Mertens
- 1944-1956 Arthur E. Jaggs
- 1956-1967 Jonathan Edwards
- 1967-1984 Michael H. Sellors, later Dean of St. George's Cathedral, Jerusalem (1997–2002)
- 1984-1991 Michael Chapman, later Archdeacon of Northampton (1991–2004)
- 1992-1999 Humphrey Southern, later Bishop of Repton (2007–2015) and Principal of Ripon College Cuddesdon (2015–present)
- 2000-2002 P.A. Smith
- 2003-2010 John J. Page
- 2011–2024 Alan and Lesley Crawley

== Gallery ==
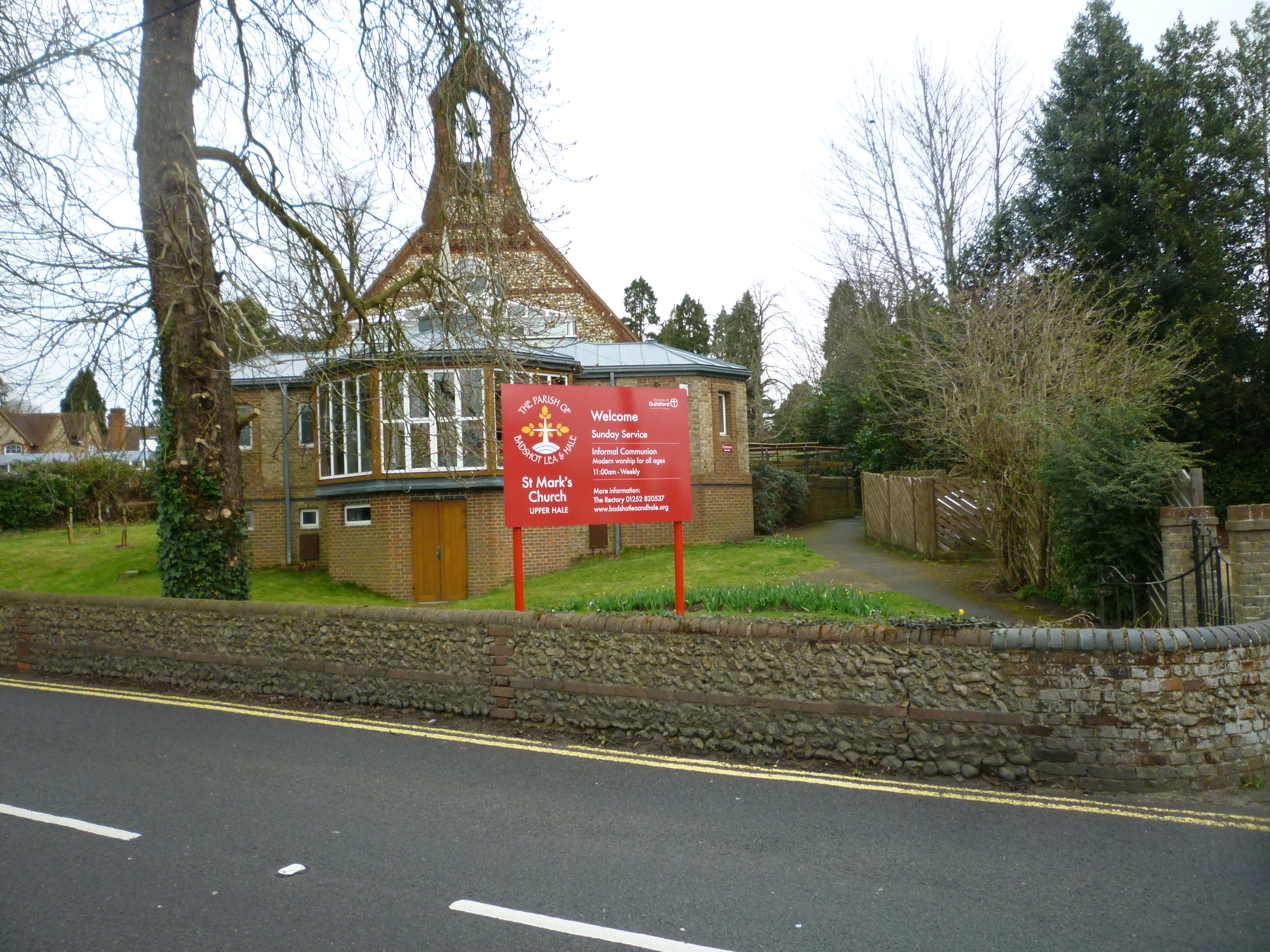
Exterior

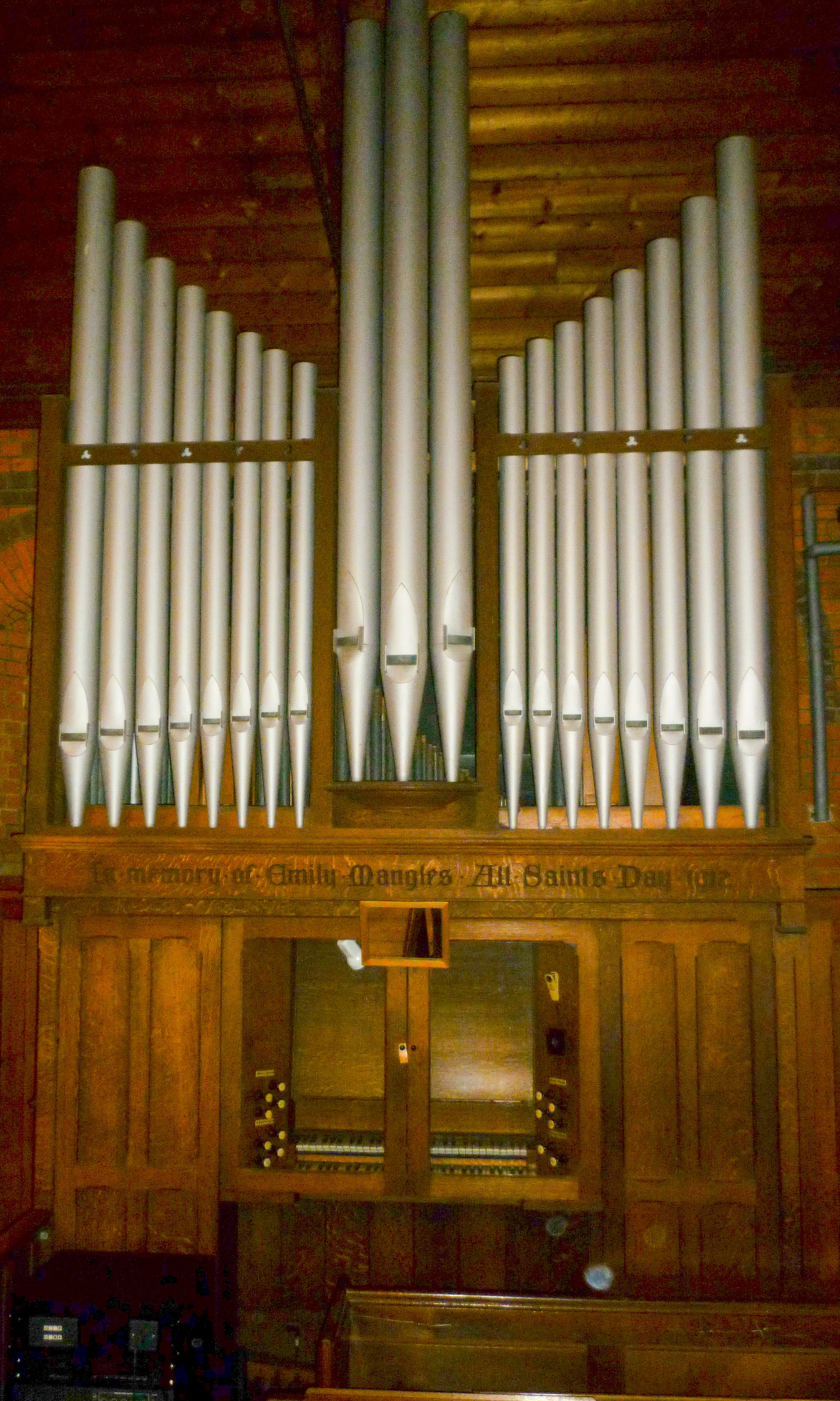
Organ

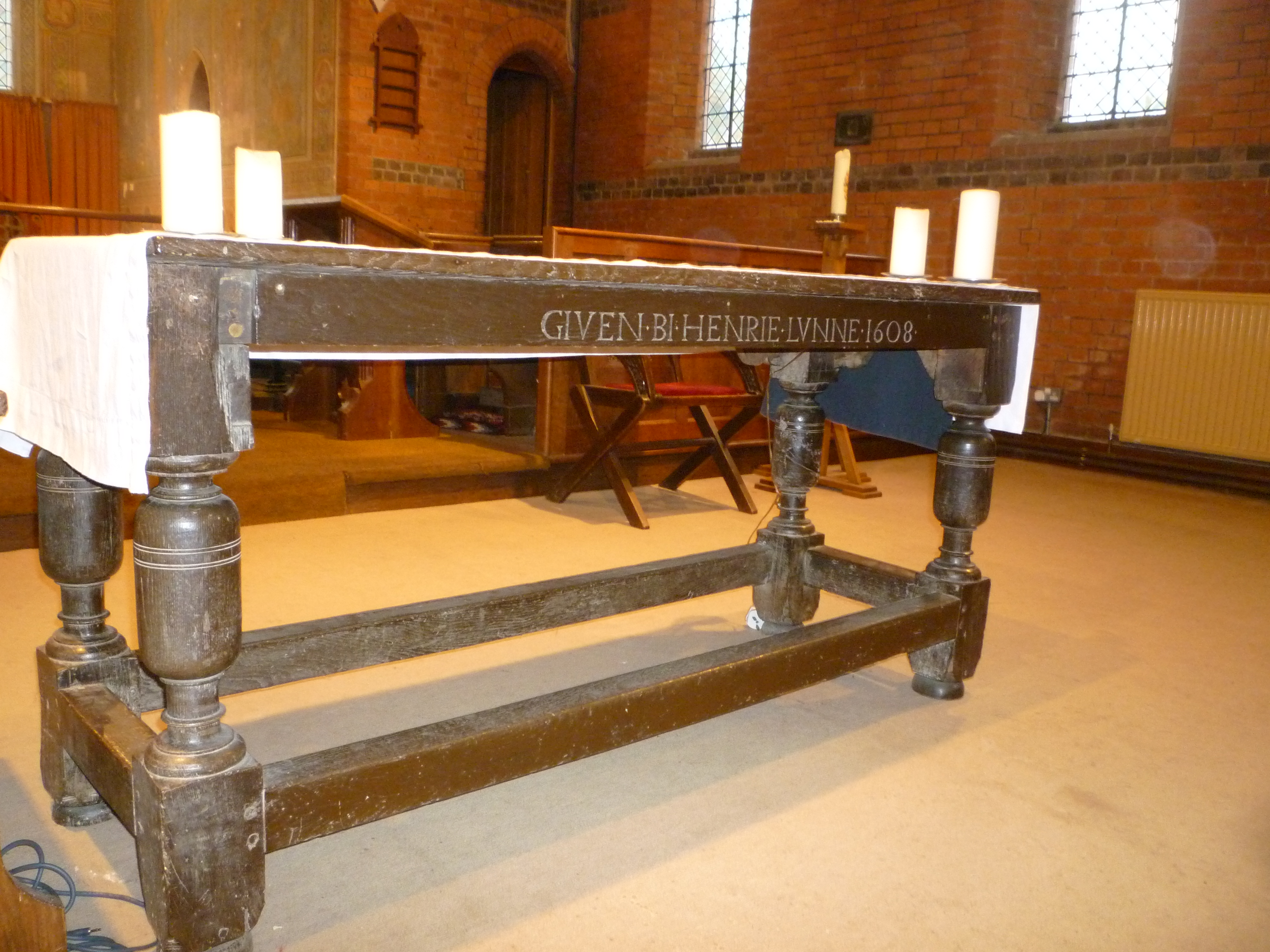
Altar

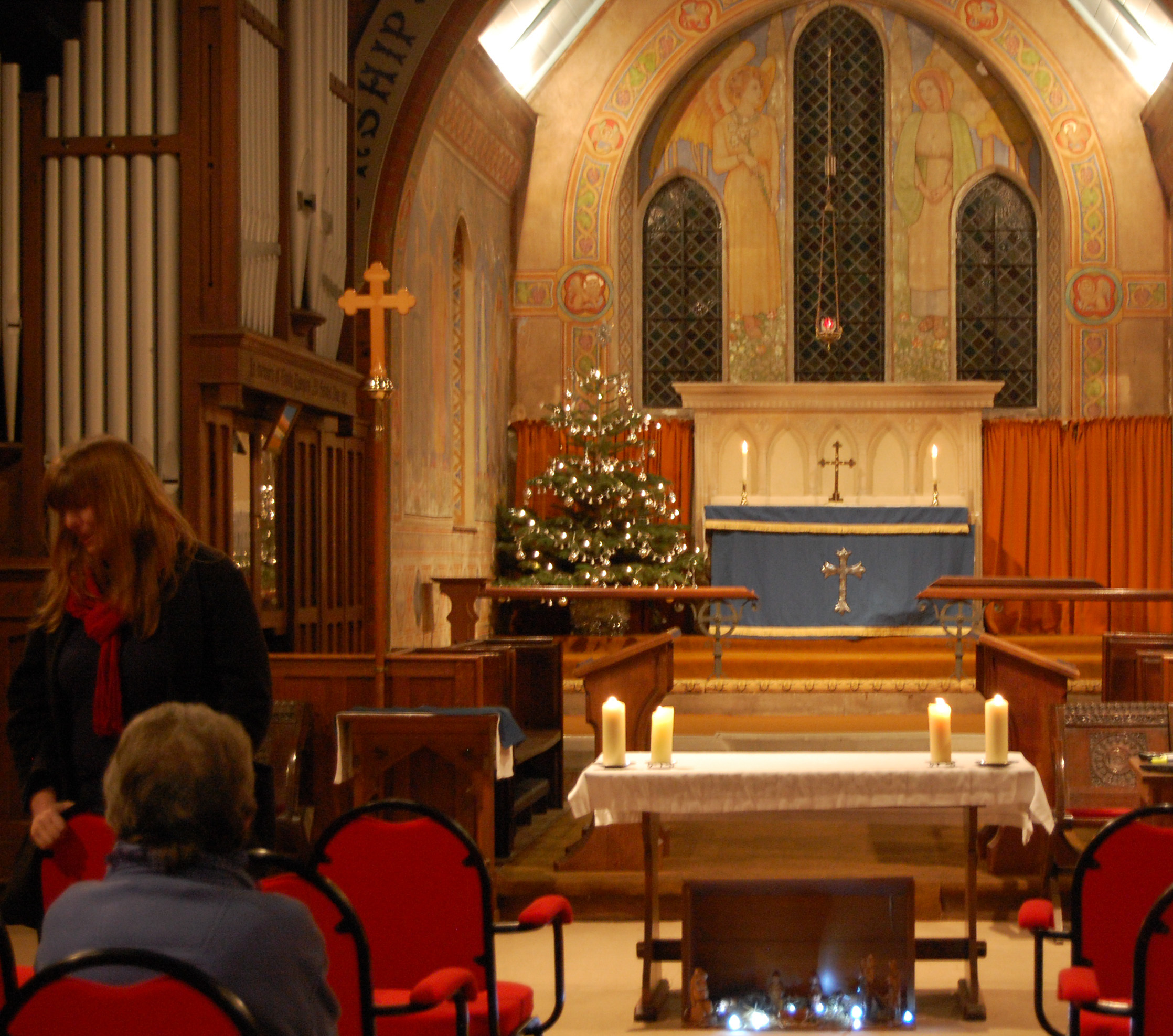
Interior

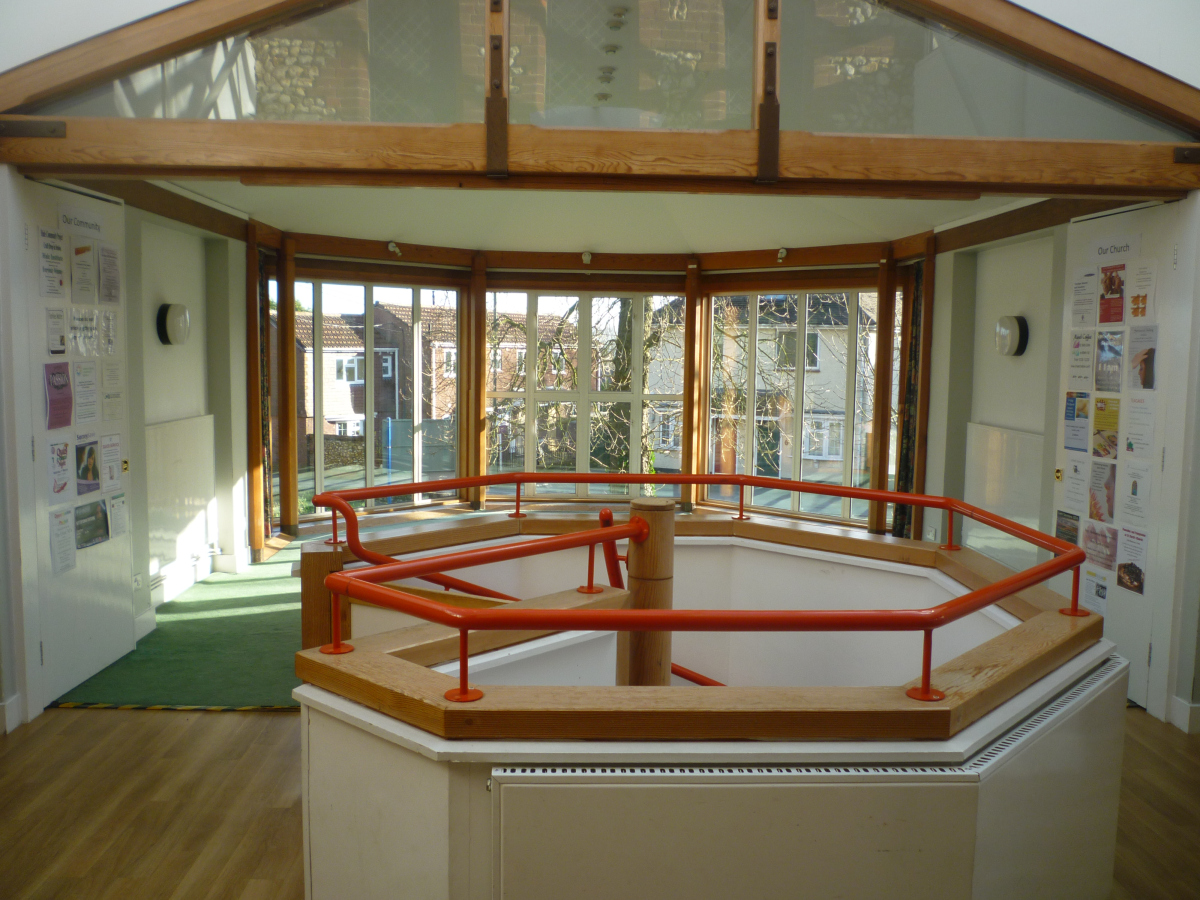
St Mark's Centre

== See also ==
- List of places of worship in Waverley (borough)
