= Charles Sumner (bishop) =

Church of England bishop (1790–1874)

The Right Reverend Charles Sumner
- Bishop of Winchester
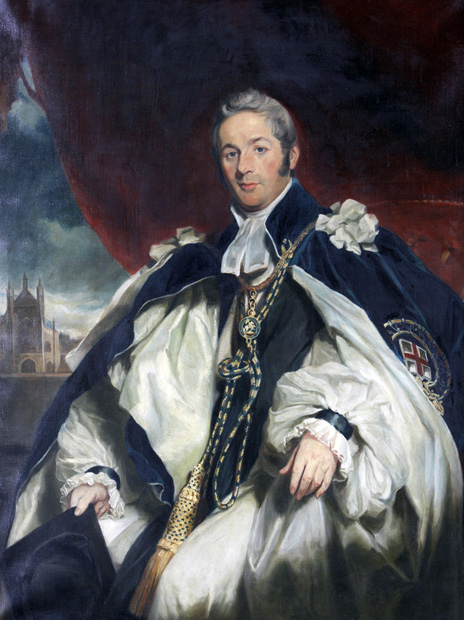
- Portrait of Sumner in the robes of the Order of the Garter by Sir Martin Archer Shee, 1833
- Province: Province of Canterbury
- Diocese: Diocese of Winchester

Personal details
- Born: Charles Richard Sumner; 22 November 1790 Kenilworth, England
- Died: 15 August 1874 (aged 83) Farnham, England
- Denomination: Church of England
- Education: Eton College; Trinity College, Cambridge

Charles Richard Sumner (22 November 1790 – 15 August 1874) was a Church of England bishop.

== Life ==
Charles Sumner was a brother of John Bird Sumner, Archbishop of Canterbury. Their father was Robert Sumner, and their mother was Hannah Bird, a first cousin of William Wilberforce.

Sumner was educated at Eton College and Trinity College, Cambridge and graduated Bachelor of Arts (BA) in 1814 and Cambridge Master of Arts (MA) in 1817. After ordination he ministered for the two winters of 1814–1816 to the English congregation in Geneva. From 1816 to 1821 he was curate of Highclere, Hampshire. In 1820, George IV wished to appoint him as a canon of Windsor, but the prime minister, Robert Jenkinson, 2nd Earl of Liverpool, objected; Sumner received instead a royal chaplaincy and librarianship. Other preferments quickly followed; in 1826 he was consecrated Bishop of Llandaff (at that point the Bishop of Llandaff was also Dean of St Paul's Cathedral, London) and in 1827 Bishop of Winchester. In 1869 he resigned his seat, but continued to live at the official residence in Farnham until his death on 15 August 1874.

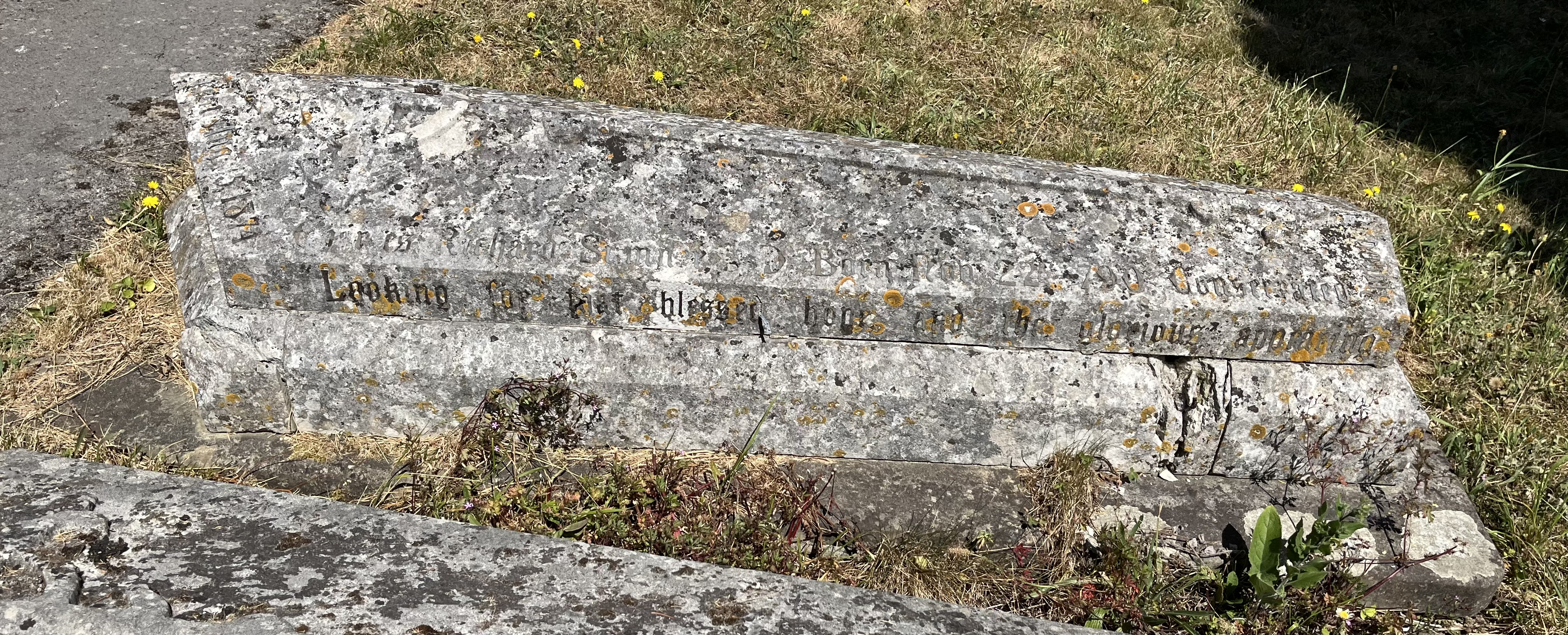
The grave of Charles Sumner in Hale, Surrey

He and his wife are buried in the churchyard of St John the Evangelist Church in Hale, Surrey.

Though Evangelical in his views he did not confine his patronage to that school.

He and his brother were members of the Canterbury Association from 27 March 1848.

== Works ==
Sumner published a number of charges and sermons and The Ministerial Character of Christ Practically Considered (London, 1824). He also edited and translated John Milton's De doctrina christiana, which was found in the State Paper office in 1823, and formed the text of Macaulay's essay on Milton.

== Family ==
Sumner married Jennie Fanny Barnabine Maunoir (23 February 1794 – 3 September 1849) and had seven children - four sons and three daughters, including:

- John Maunoir Sumner (c. 1816 at Highclere – 1 April 1886), rector of North Waltham 1842–1845, and of Buriton, Hampshire, 1845, until his death.
- Louisanna Sumner (1817–1899), who married the Rev. William Gibson, Rector of Fawley, Hampshire, and had eleven children including:
  - Arthur Sumner Gibson (1844–1927), a rugby union international, who played in the first international match in 1871
  - Edgar Charles Sumner Gibson, (1848–1924), Bishop of Gloucester
  - Alan George Sumner Gibson (1856–1922), Coadjutor Bishop of Cape Town from 1894
- Sophia Albertina Sumner (1823–1884), married the Rev. William Henry Ridley
- George Henry Sumner (1824–1909), Bishop of Guildford, whose wife Mary founded the Mothers' Union
- Emily Sarah Frances Sumner (1832–1926), who married Robert Newman Milford (1829–1913), Rector of East Knoyle, Wiltshire and canon of Salisbury Cathedral, whose children included Sir Humphrey Sumner Milford, a publisher at Oxford University Press

Church of England titles
Preceded by William Van Mildert	Bishop of Llandaff and Dean of St Paul's; 1826–1827	Succeeded by Edward Copleston
Preceded by George Pretyman-Tomline	Bishop of Winchester; 1827–1869	Succeeded by Samuel Wilberforce
