= Alan Gibson (bishop) =

Alan George Sumner Gibson was Coadjutor Bishop of Cape Town from 1894 to 1906.

== Early life ==
He was born in 1856 to William Gibson (1804–1862), Rector of Fawley, and Louisanna Sumner (1817-1899), daughter of Charles Sumner, Bishop of Winchester. He was educated at Haileybury and Corpus Christi College, Oxford and ordained in 1881.

== Clerical career ==
He was vice-principal of St Paul Burgh Missionary College then curate of Croft, Lincolnshire. He was the incumbent of Umtata Pro-Cathedral from 1882 to 1884; Missionary at Dalindyebo from 1884 to 1893; Canon of Umtata from 1885 to 1894; Archdeacon of Kokstad from 1886 to 1891; 91; Diocesan Secretary from 1892 to 1894; rector of Claremont from 1894 to 1897; and Canon of St. George's Cathedral, Cape Town from 1895 to 1906.

== Works ==
Gibson was a prolific author; amongst others he wrote:

- Intloko Zentshumayelo (Kaffir Sermon Sketches), 1890;
- Eight Years in Kaffraria, 1891;
- Some Thoughts on Missionary Work and Life, 1894;
- Sermon Sketches for a Year, 1898;
- Between Cape Town and Loanda, 1905;
- Translations from the Organon of Aristotle, 1877;
- Reminiscences of the Pondomisi War, 1900; and
- Sketches of Church Work and Life in the Diocese of Cape Town, 1901;

Gibson died on 20 October 1922.
