= Farnham Heath End School =

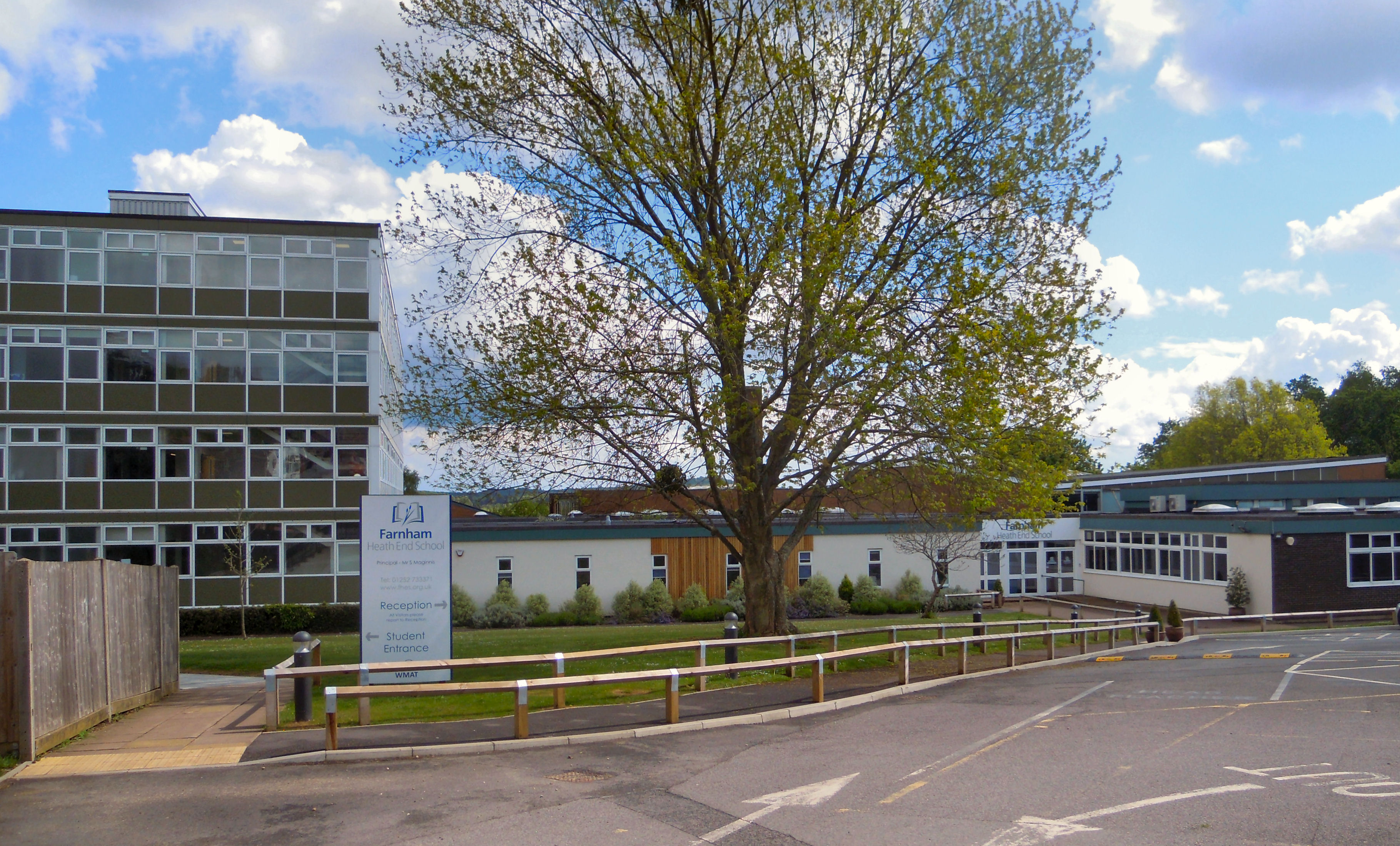
- Farnham Heath End School in 2020

Location
- Hale Reeds; Farnham, Surrey, GU9 9BN; England; 51.23199°N 0.78348°W

Information
- Type: Academy
- Department for Education URN: 144520 Tables
- Ofsted: Reports
- Principal: Stuart Maginnis
- Gender: Coeducational
- Age: 11 to 16-17 (17 For one person)
- Enrollment: 1092
- Colour: Blue
- Website: www.fhes.org.uk

Farnham Heath End School is a mixed coeducational secondary school with academy status, in Heath End, Surrey, with 1092 pupils.

== About ==
In April 2013 the school became a Specialist Mathematics and Computing College. The school has "Healthy School" status and is accredited as an "Investor in People". It converted to an academy in 2013.

== Ofsed Inspection judgements ==
- 2011: Satisfactory
- 2012: Good
- 2016: Requires Improvement
- 2020: Good

== Alumni ==
- Joel Freeland, basketball player
- Kylie Grimes, para-athlete
- Carole Hersee, the Test Card Girl
- Jann Turner, film director, novelist, television director and screenwriter
- Ella Chandler, cricketer
