= John Gibson (cricketer, born 1833) =

English cricketer and priest

John Sumner Gibson (25 November 1833 – 28 September 1892) was an English priest and first-class cricketer who played in one match for Cambridge University, the 1855 University match against Oxford. He was born at Chester and died at Iridge Place, a listed country house near Hurst Green, East Sussex.

== Family and background ==
Gibson was the eldest son of William Gibson (a priest; 1804–1862) and his first wife, Eliza Maria, who was the daughter of John Bird Sumner, Archbishop of Canterbury; the reformer and churchman William Wilberforce was also a relation. After Eliza Maria died in 1836, William Gibson married her cousin, Louisiana, who was the daughter of Charles Sumner, Bishop of Winchester from 1827 to 1868. Many of the 13 children produced by William Gibson's two marriages had "Sumner" as part of their collection of forenames, and some then hyphenated it with "Gibson" to produce a double-barrelled surname; John Sumner Gibson appears not to have done so and to have been known, in the family at least, as "Sumner Gibson" with "Sumner" as the preferred forename.

== Cricket and after ==
Gibson was educated at Harrow School, where he played in the cricket team, and at Trinity College, Cambridge. His one recorded first-class cricket match was the University Match of 1855 when he batted low in the batting order, scoring 8 and 23, and did not bowl.

Gibson was ordained as a Church of England priest and held various parish incumbencies in Kent, Warwickshire and Derbyshire up to 1873, when he appears to have retired to East Sussex.
