= Heath End, Surrey =

Village in Surrey, England

Coordinates: 51.237°N 0.788°W

Heath End
- Location within Surrey
- Area: 0.58 km^{2} (0.22 sq mi)
- Population: 1,628 (Civil Parish 2011)
  - Density: 2,807/km^{2} (7,270/sq mi)
- OS grid reference: SU8449
- District: Waverley
- Shire county: Surrey
- Region: South East
- Country: England
- Sovereign state: United Kingdom
- Post town: Farnham
- Postcode district: GU9
- Dialling code: 01252
- Police: Surrey
- Fire: Surrey
- Ambulance: South East Coast
- UK Parliament: Farnham and Bordon

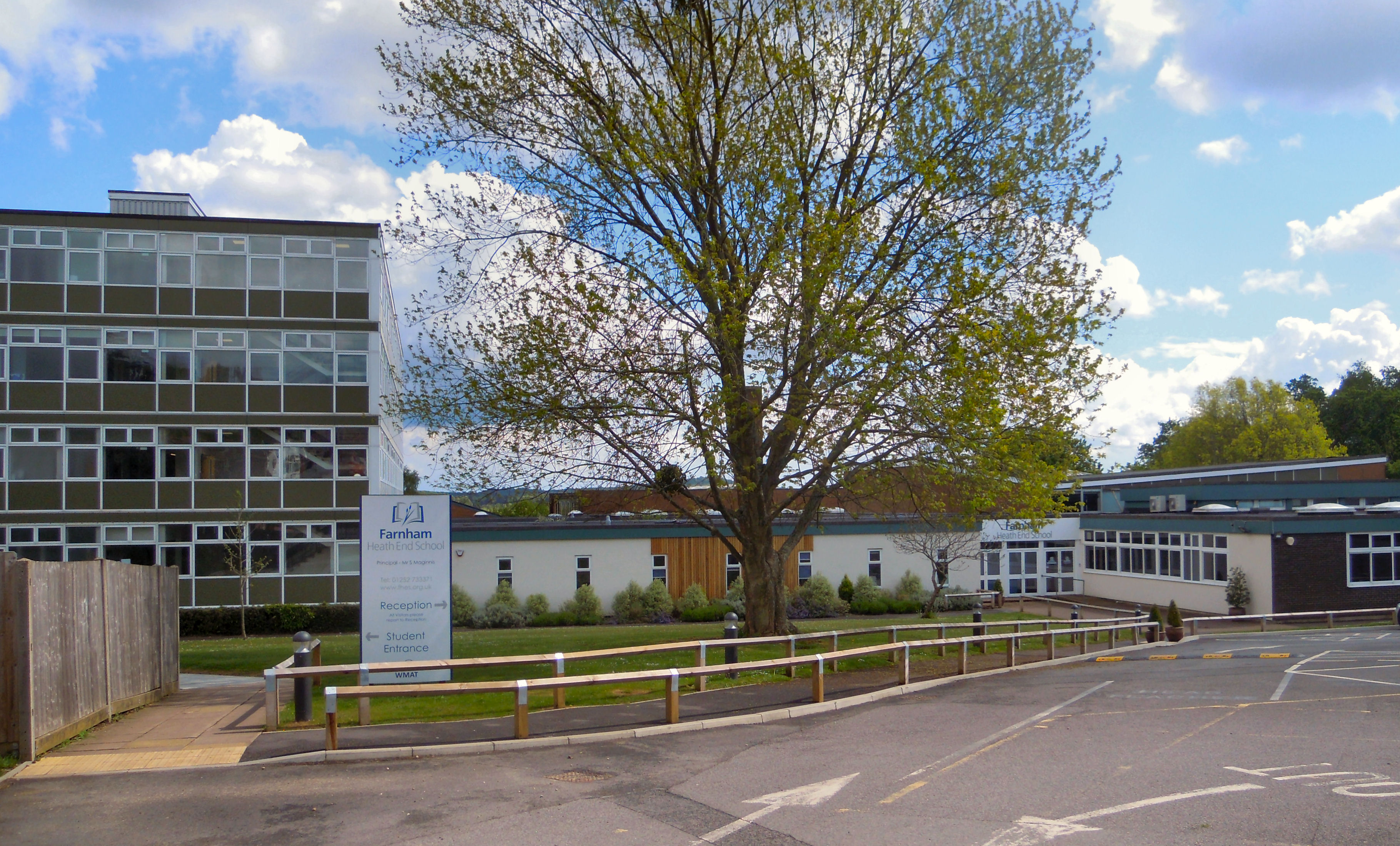
Farnham Heath End School in Farnham, Surrey in 2020

Heath End is a village in the Waverley district of Surrey, England, traditionally part of the large town parish of Farnham. Heath End is smaller in area than most villages and does not have an Anglican church so does not meet the older criteria for villages in England. It is between Farnham and Aldershot. To the north homes directly adjoin an upland in Hampshire which is a military training area.

== History and geography ==
The north part of the parish of Hale, Heath End grew rapidly after 1854, when the British Army became established in Aldershot. As the building of cottages spread, those in this area acquired its distinct name – being the homes at the end of the large military heath (in this case sandy, acidic high land that is part of the Bagshot Formation) to the west.

Heath End housed a campus of Aldershot Army College, now demolished. No dual carriageways or railways bisect the area, the nearest part of the heath is a long promontory (Hungry Hill) of 160m above ordnance datum — Heath End itself at 120-140m above ordnance datum.

The current Heath End School building was completed in 1968. Rising to four storeys, it stands above most of the surrounding estates of various uses, but primarily residential use.

The actor Bill Maynard was born in the village in 1928.

== Demography ==
The 2011 census considered the village as five relevant output layers, approximately a third of the ward.

The proportion of households all divisions of Heath End who owned their home outright was close to the borough average and above the national average in four divisions. The proportion who owned their home with a loan was in each case greater than the national average. In the east was a proportion in 2011 close to the national average of private and socially rented residential property: 24.8%.

2011 Census Key Statistics
Output area	Population	Households	% Owned outright	% Owned with a loan	hectares
E00157509 (North)	319	131	36.6	47.3	21
E00157510 (East)	356	145	22.8	46.9	13
E00157503 (South East)	312	120	33.3	42.5	10
E00157511 (Centre)	293	124	32.3	46.8	5
E00157502 (South West)	348	131	37.4	48.1	9

== Local government ==
The area is a northern part of Farnham Hale and Heath End ward that elects two borough councillors. It had a population of 4,492 in 2021.
