= Hale, Surrey =

Village and parish in Surrey, England

Coordinates: 51.227°N 0.784°W

Hale
- Location within Surrey
- OS grid reference: SU8449
- District: Waverley
- Shire county: Surrey
- Region: South East
- Country: England
- Sovereign state: United Kingdom
- Post town: Farnham
- Postcode district: GU9
- Dialling code: 01252
- Police: Surrey
- Fire: Surrey
- Ambulance: South East Coast
- UK Parliament: Farnham and Bordon

Hale is a village in Surrey, England. It lies just north of Farnham, towards Aldershot, with Badshot Lea to the east. Some maps show Lower Hale and Upper Hale, but the area between the two is indistinct. Hale in part overlaps Weybourne and Heath End, making it difficult to class them as separate villages –all three share amenities and form a neatly buffered settlement. Hale is on the side of the Farnham clay and sandstone range and is quite elevated, with some housing having views southward towards the Greensand Ridge from Hindhead to Ewhurst. The electoral ward Farnham Upper Hale has a population of 4,241.

== History ==
There is evidence that the area has been occupied since the Mesolithic period. Some of the oldest surviving buildings in Hale date from the late 17th century, in the area once known as Hungry Hill.

The oldest place of worship in the village is a chapel built in 1834. St John's Church was founded in 1844. It was paid for by Bishop Sumner and designed by the architect Benjamin Ferrey. Sumner is buried in the churchyard with his wife.

Hale grew rapidly after 1854 when the British Army became established in Aldershot. Many people came to the area seeking employment in building the nearby town and barracks. As the cottages spread, those nearer to Aldershot formed a separate village, which became known as Heath End. In recognition of the services they had rendered, the army gave the villagers of Hale 2 acres (0.81 ha) of land for a new cemetery, Upper Hale Cemetery. The church of St Mark the Evangelist was built opposite the cemetery in 1883.

== Buildings and structures ==
At Upper Hale, there is at 51°14'5"N 0°48'54"W a 27.43 metres (90 ft) tall wooden radio tower. It is one of the few wooden radio towers in the world and today used by radio amateurs as ATV relay station .

== Schools ==
=== Primary schools ===
There are two primary schools in Upper Hale, which are:

- Hale School
- Folly Hill Infant School

As well as these, William Cobbett Primary School is also on the outskirts of nearby Weybourne.

=== Secondary schools ===
There are no secondary schools in Hale, but Farnham Heath End School is very close-by, and All Hallows School is in Weybourne, near to William Cobbett Primary School.

=== Higher education ===
Higher Education options are provided by nearby Guildford, Farnham and Farnborough.

== See also ==
- Caesar's Camp, Rushmoor and Waverley
- List of places of worship in Waverley (borough)
