= St John the Evangelist Church, Hale, Surrey =

St John's
- St John the Evangelist, Hale
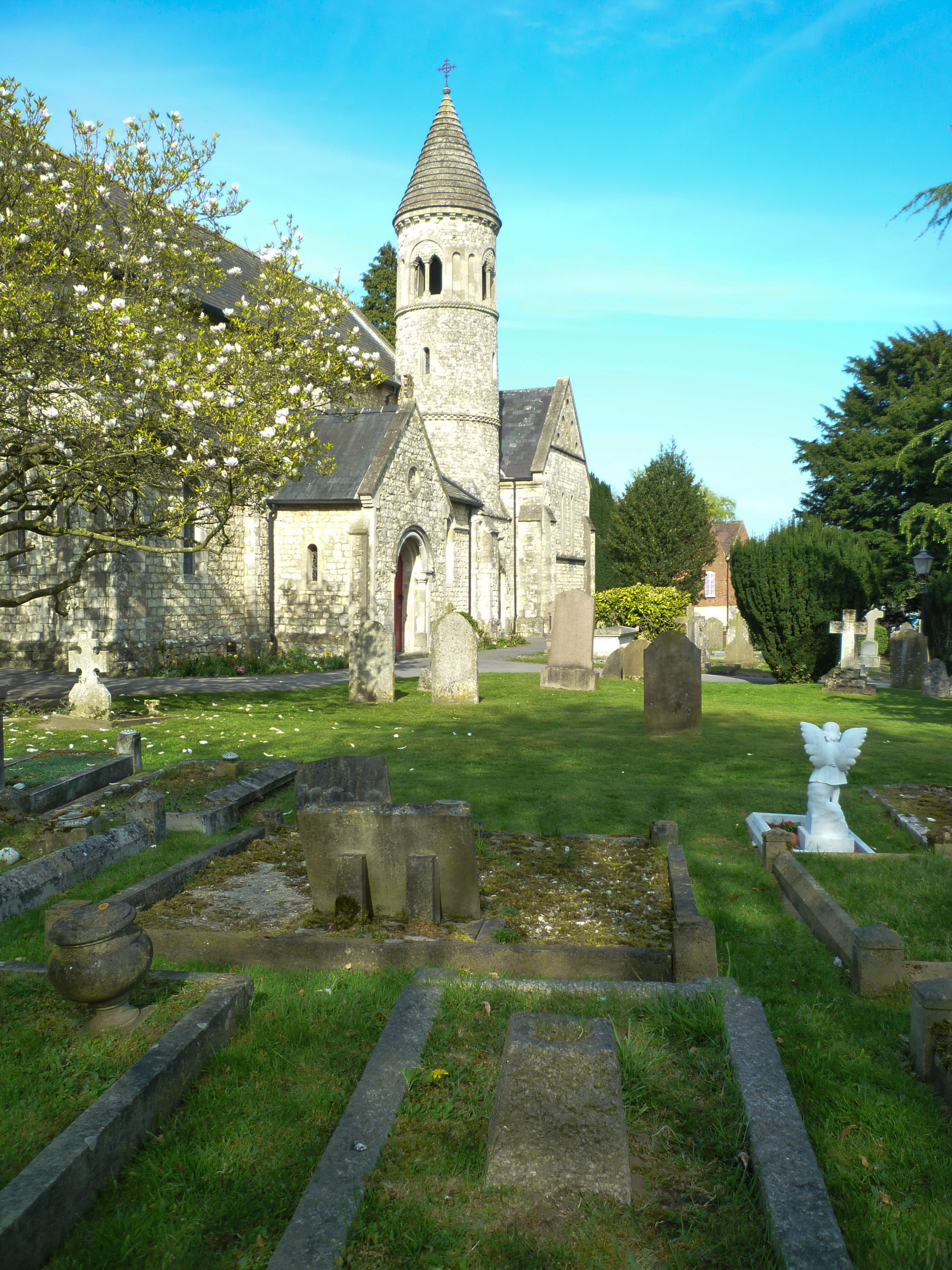
- St John the Evangelist

- Location in Surrey
- 51°13′41″N 0°47′07″W
- OS grid reference: SU 84915 48343
- Location: Hale Road, Hale, Surrey, GU9 9RP
- Country: England
- Denomination: Church of England
- Churchmanship: Liberal Catholic
- Website: badshotleaandhale.org/

History
- Status: Active
- Founder: Charles Sumner (bishop)
- Dedication: John the Evangelist

Architecture
- Functional status: Parish church
- Heritage designation: Grade II listed
- Designated: 26 April 1950
- Architect: Benjamin Ferrey
- Architectural type: Romanesque Revival architecture
- Completed: November 1844

Administration
- Diocese: Diocese of Guildford
- Archdeaconry: Archdeaconry of Surrey
- Deanery: Farnham
- Parish: Badshot Lea and Hale

Clergy
- Rector: The Rev'ds Alan and Lesley Crawley

St John the Evangelist Church is a Church of England parish church in Hale, Surrey. Consecrated in 1844, the church is now a Grade II listed building.

== History ==
The church was designed by the architect Benjamin Ferrey. Unlike Ferrey's other designs, the church is not in his characteristic Gothic Revival style but has a "wild neo-Romanesque"/neo-Norman appearance. The walls are of clunch and sandstone, and there is an unusual four-stage circular tower."

Bishop Charles Sumner consecrated the church on 8 November 1844. He was Bishop of Winchester from 1827 to 1869 and lived at his official residence, Farnham Castle. Also in attendance was his son, George Sumner, and archdeacon Samuel Wilberforce. Charles Sumner and his wife, Jennie, are buried in the churchyard. However very soon the church was too small and an appeal to extend the church stated:

A few years after the opening of the Church, Aldershot, from being an obscure hamlet, became a large Garrison town. The effect of this upon the adjoining Parish of Hale, was such, as almost immediately to double the population. At the census of 1861, it was found to have risen from a few hundreds, to nearly 3,000 people; the population is now little less than 4,000, and is still rapidly increasing.

With so large a Parish, there is only Church Accommodation for 175 persons; —and besides the regular Parishioners, many Officers and their families are in the habit of attending from Aldershot, and they would do so in greater numbers, could room be found for them. It is therefore proposed to meet the urgent demand for further accommodation, by an addition, of 400 Sittings to the Church, this being the largest increase of which the building is capable.

Plans have been drawn out by Benjn. Ferrey, F.S.A. Esq., of Charing Cross, the Architect of the original structure, for the Erection of a North Transept, the Enlargement of the South Aisle, and an Extension of the present very contracted Chancel.

To carry out those alterations fully, a sum of £1300 will be required, for which an appeal is now made to the Christian liberality of churchmen. The Parishioners of Hale, are among the very poorest, in the Diocese of Winchester, and there is not one gentleman resident in the place. The present Incumbent has no private means, and his clerical income is insufficient to meet the demands of so poor and so rapidly increasing population.

The church was extended significantly in 1897.

The church was designated as a Grade II listed building on 26 April 1950.

== Buried in the churchyard ==
In addition to Charles and Jennie Sumner, other notable graves include:

- John Henry Knight (inventor), builder of one of Britain's first petrol-powered motor vehicles.
- James Fellowes (cricketer) played first class cricket for Kent County Cricket Club and Hampshire County Cricket Club.

Also there are:

- Five Commonwealth Graves
  - Lieutenant Colonel Owen, Lindsay Cunliffe.
  - Private Hammond, J E.
  - Driver Moore, William Fenwick.
  - Rifleman Collyer, Sydney Harry.
  - Warrant Officer Class II (C.S.M.) Webb, William Leslie.
- 321 people who died in Farnham Workhouse between the years of 1845 and 1872

== Present day ==
St John the Evangelist is part of the parish of Badshot Lea and Hale in the Diocese of Guildford. The church stands in the Liberal Catholic tradition of the Church of England. It is listed as an Inclusive Church.

== List of incumbents ==
- 1868–1875 George E. Fox
- 1875–1879 David Rowe
- 1879–1891 John Powell
- 1891–1894 Robert Brown
- 1894–1910 G.E.Hitchcock
- 1910–1914 Alan M. Watson
- 1914–1917 H.D. Birley
- 1917–1923 John du V. Brunton
- 1923–1926 Bernard Woodard
- 1926–1930 E. Logan-Hunter
- 1930–1941 J.L.R Pastfield
- 1941–1944 R.H.C. Mertens
- 1944–1956 Arthur E. Jaggs
- 1956–1967 Jonathan Edwards
- 1967–1984 Michael H. Sellors, later Dean of St. George's Cathedral, Jerusalem (1997–2002)
- 1984–1991 Michael Chapman, later Archdeacon of Northampton (1991–2004)
- 1992–1999 Humphrey Southern, later Bishop of Repton (2007–2015) and Principal of Ripon College Cuddesdon (2015–present)
- 2000–2002 P.A.Smith
- 2003–2010 John J. Page
- 2011–present Alan and Lesley Crawley

== See also ==
- List of places of worship in Waverley (borough)
