= Farnham and Bordon =

UK Parliament constituency (since 2024)

Coordinates: 51.14°N 0.79°W

- County constituency for the House of Commons
- Interactive map of boundaries from 2024
- Boundary of Farnham and Bordon in South East England
- County: Hampshire; Surrey
- Electorate: 72,938 (2023)
- Major settlements: Bordon; Farnham; Frensham; Haslemere

Current constituency
- Created: 2024
- Member of Parliament: Greg Stafford (Conservative)
- Seats: One
- Created from: East Hampshire; South West Surrey

Farnham and Bordon is a constituency of the House of Commons in the UK Parliament. It is a cross-county constituency covering parts of Hampshire and Surrey. It was first contested in the 2024 general election and is currently represented by Greg Stafford of the Conservative Party.

A majority of the population, of the electorate and of the land area of this constituency come from the Borough of Waverley in Surrey, with the relevant wards of the District of East Hampshire making up a significant minority of the seat.

== Constituency profile ==
The Farnham and Bordon constituency is located in South East England and covers parts of Hampshire and Surrey. It includes the towns of Farnham, Bordon and Haslemere and the villages of Liphook, Headley and Hale. Farnham is a historic market town and Bordon grew around a British Army base during the 20th century. The eastern parts of the constituency lie within the Surrey Hills National Landscape, part of the North Downs range of hills. The constituency is generally affluent with low levels of deprivation; Farnham and Haslemere fall within the top 10% least-deprived areas in England. The average house price is almost double the national figure.

Residents of the constituency are generally older and well-educated. Household income and rates of professional employment are very high compared to the rest of the country. White people made up 93% of the population at the 2021 census. At the local council level, Farnham and Bordon are mostly represented by local residents' associations, Haslemere by Liberal Democrats and the villages and rural areas by Conservatives. An estimated 55% of voters in the constituency supported remaining in the European Union in the 2016 referendum, higher than the nationwide figure of 48%.

== Boundaries ==
The constituency was created by the 2023 review of Westminster constituencies, and is composed of the following wards:

- The District of East Hampshire wards of Bramshott & Liphook, Grayshott, Headley, Lindford, Whitehill Chase, Whitehill Hogmoor & Greatham, and Whitehill Pinewood.
- The Borough of Waverley wards of Farnham Bourne, Farnham Castle, Farnham Firgrove, Farnham Heath End, Farnham Moor Park, Farnham North West, Farnham Rowledge, Farnham Weybourne, Haslemere East, Haslemere West, Hindhead & Beacon Hill, and Western Commons (except Thursley parish).

It comprises the following areas of Hampshire and Surrey:

- In the Borough of Waverley: Farnham, Hindhead, Beacon Hill and Haslemere from South West Surrey
- In the East Hampshire District: Bordon, Bramshott and Liphook, Grayshott, Headley, Lindford and Whitehill from East Hampshire

== Members of Parliament ==
Election	Member	Party
2024	Greg Stafford	Conservative

== Elections ==
=== Elections in the 2020s ===
General election 2024: Farnham and Bordon
Party	Candidate	Votes	%	±%
Conservative	Greg Stafford	18,951	35.7	−23.7
Liberal Democrats	Khalil Yousuf	17,602	33.2	+0.4
Labour	Alex Just	7,328	13.8	+7.0
Reform	Ged Hall	6,217	11.7	N/A
Green	Claire Matthes	2,496	4.7	+3.8
Hampshire Ind.	Don Jerrard	421	0.8	N/A
Majority		1,349	2.5	−24.0
Turnout		53,015	69.8	−0.3
Registered electors		75,918		
Conservative hold		Swing	−12.1	

=== Elections in the 2010s ===
2019 national result
Party	Vote	%
Conservative	30,376	59.4
Liberal Democrats	16,799	32.8
Labour	3,487	6.8
Green	479	0.9
Turnout	51,141	70.1
Electorate	72,938	

== See also ==
- Parliamentary constituencies in Hampshire
- Parliamentary constituencies in Surrey
- List of parliamentary constituencies in the South East England (region)
