= St Edmund Church, Godalming =

St Edmund's Church
- The Church of St Edmund King and Martyr
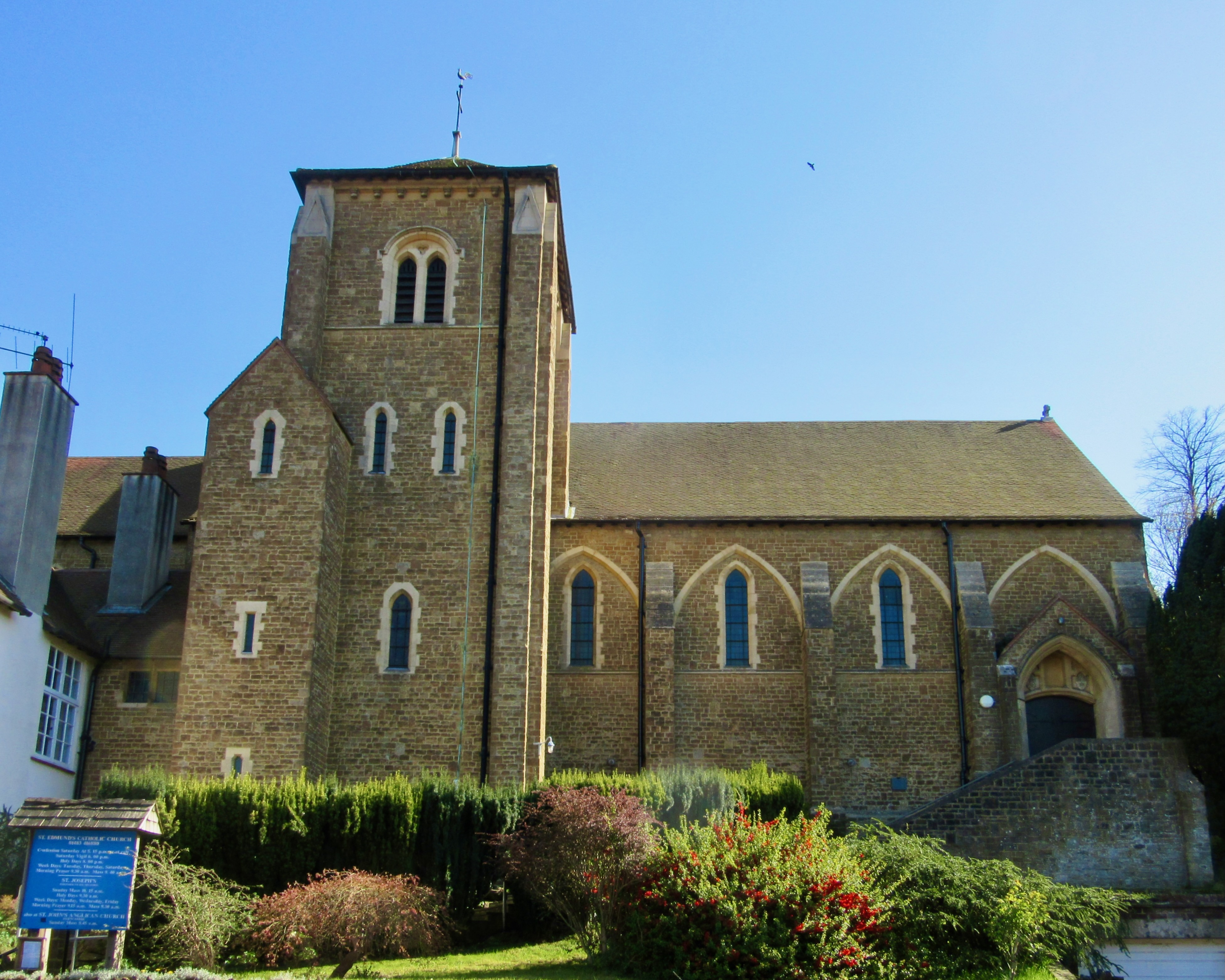
- The church viewed from the north

Location map and quick summary
Location	19 Croft Road, Godalming, Surrey GU7 1DB
Country	England
Denomination	Roman Catholic
Website	StEdmundGodalming.btck.co.uk
History
Status	Active
Founded	26 November 1899
Dedication	Saint Edmund the Martyr
Consecrated	3 October 1923
Architecture
Functional status	Parish church
Heritage designation	Grade II listed
Designated	1 February 1991
Architect	Frederick Walters
Style	Gothic Revival
Years built	1905–06
Groundbreaking	8 October 1905
Completed	27 June 1906
Construction cost	£4,700
Specifications
Length	98.5 feet (30.0 m)
Width	21.5 feet (6.6 m)
Materials	Bargate stone
Administration
Province	Southwark
- Diocese: Arundel and Brighton
- Deanery: Guildford

St Edmund's Church (in full, The Church of St Edmund King and Martyr) is the Roman Catholic parish church of Godalming, a town in the English county of Surrey. It was built in 1906 to the design of Frederick Walters and is a Grade II listed building. The church stands on a "dramatic hillside site" on the corner of Croft Road just off Flambard Way close to the centre of the town.

Although originally present from ancient times, since the 1500s the Catholic Church had no modern presence in the historic town of Godalming—known for its Protestant Nonconformity—until the end of the 19th century, and the parish of St Edmund's has always covered a large rural area of southwest Surrey. Since the church was founded in 1899 Mass has also been said at various other locations, from purpose-built churches to converted barns and halls, in the surrounding villages; and St Edmund's continues to support a daughter church at nearby Milford. Hospitals, convents and Catholic schools are also within the parish, and a large Polish community has been served by Polish-speaking priests for many years.

The "fine, if austere" church is built of local stone and overlooks the town. It is one of several churches in the area designed by the prolific architect Frederick Walters. The interior decoration dates from various times in the 20th century and includes rare bas-relief Stations of the Cross, an ornate Lady chapel and stained glass by Hardman & Co.

== Early Catholicism in Godalming ==
After the English Reformation, the Catholic faith almost died out in Surrey. In 1588, one recusant was recorded in Godalming—an ancient, principally industrial town in the west of the county—and another lived nearby in Thursley, but a survey by Sir William More (Note: More's roles in Surrey during the 16th century included Knight of the Shire, Justice of the peace, Sheriff, Deputy Lieutenant and Member of parliament for the Guildford constituency. He also enforced the Elizabethan Religious Settlement in the county.) three years later found none. Moreover, by the 17th century Godalming was "a hotbed of radical Protestant Nonconformity". Until the 19th century, the only Catholic worship in the west of Surrey took place at the Sutton Place estate, owned by a Catholic family (a chapel in the house was succeeded by a church in 1876), and at a private chapel in Westbrook House, Godalming—home of the Oglethorpe family, where Theophilus Oglethorpe mp was Protestant but his wife Eleanor Oglethorpe and their daughters were Catholic. A Mass centre—sources differ on whether it was a temporary chapel or merely part of a house—was founded in central Guildford in 1792 and was served by émigré priests from France, but it disappeared in or soon after 1801, after which Sutton Place resumed its role as "the rendezvous for Surrey Catholics".

The Catholic population of Godalming grew during the 19th century. By 1860, when priests from Sutton Place founded and built a new Catholic church in Guildford, about 60 residents travelled there every Sunday for Mass. This arrangement continued for the rest of the century, but in 1899 Captain W.H. Rushbrooke of Bowlhead Green, a nearby hamlet, bought a site in Croft Road (Note: 51.184235°N 0.613523°W) and arranged for a tin tabernacle to be erected. This was opened on 26 November 1899 by Bishop of Southwark Francis Bourne and was dedicated to Edmund the Martyr, 9th-century king of East Anglia, because Rushbrooke was from Suffolk where Edmund lived and was buried. Rushbrooke, described on this death in 1926 as "a very faithful supporter ... and a great benefactor [of] the Catholic Church", also built a chapel at his home and funded the permanent church in Guildford and the first church in Farnham.

== The present church ==
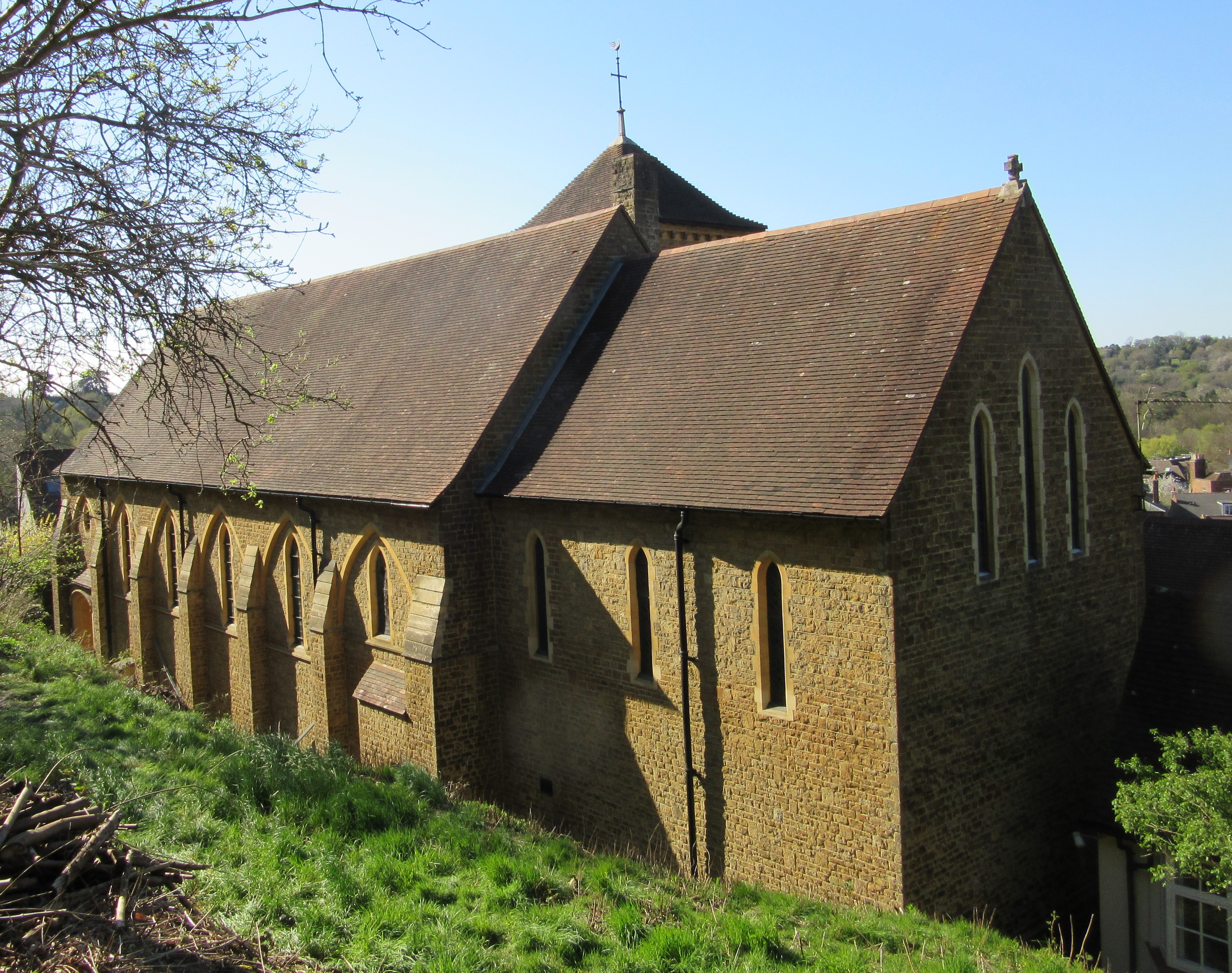
North side

At first, the tin tabernacle was served by priests from the Franciscan friary at Chilworth and from the church at Guildford. It was allocated its own parish in 1904, and the first resident priest was appointed on 1 November of that year. Fr. St George Kieran Hyland was 29 years old and had served as a curate at St George's Cathedral, Southwark; Godalming was his first appointment as a priest. Recognising the need for a larger permanent church, he took steps to purchase land on a "towering bank of undeveloped hillside" further along Croft Road. The site was acquired on 15 May 1905, the first stone of the new church was laid on 8 October 1905 and construction was completed on 27 June 1906. The local firm of David Fry built the church, and the architect was Frederick Walters. This "extraordinarily prolific architect" designed more than 50 Catholic churches, many in southeast England.

The church cost £4,700 to build. Some of the money was donated anonymously before work started, but after the church opened fundraising began immediately to raise the remainder. Fr. Hyland gave lectures and organised various events, and after the debt was cleared St Edmund's Church was consecrated by Bishop Peter Amigo. The service was held on 3 October 1923. A new High altar was installed just before this at a cost of £1,000, and a reredos was put up at the same time; the set of altar rails date from the later in the 1920s; and the Lady chapel was created in 1930 in the base of the tower. Also in the mid-1920s, a church hall was built on the site of the old tin tabernacle, which had served as the parish hall until then. The debt from this was paid off by 1930. The windows of the church were fitted with stained glass in stages between 1922 and 1950.

Canon Hyland (he became a canon in the early 1920s) died in 1950, having served the parish since 1904. He was buried under the sanctuary of St Edmund's Church in a burial vault built in 1949. During the course of his ministry he held many other administrative roles: he was chaplain to the Surrey County Sanatorium (now Milford Hospital) and the King George V Sanatorium at Hydestile, and performed the same role at the Holy Cross Sanatorium (now Holy Cross Hospital) in Haslemere until the town was separately parished in 1924. In 1920, just before he became Canon, he was appointed rector to St John's Seminary, Wonersh, and he was dean of Guildford Deanery. His successor was Fr Denis Hawkins, known internationally for his theological and philosophical writing. During his 14 years as parish priest, a hall at Elstead began to be used for worship and the site for a church in Milford was bought. Attendances at St Edmund's Church rose in the late 1950s after a former barracks in the town was converted into temporary accommodation for refugees from the Hungarian Revolution of 1956, many of whom were Catholic. Godalming already had a large Polish population, and Mass was said in Polish at St Edmund's for many years. After St Joseph's Church was built in Milford the Polish community gravitated to that church, and a Polish priest continues to celebrate Mass there.

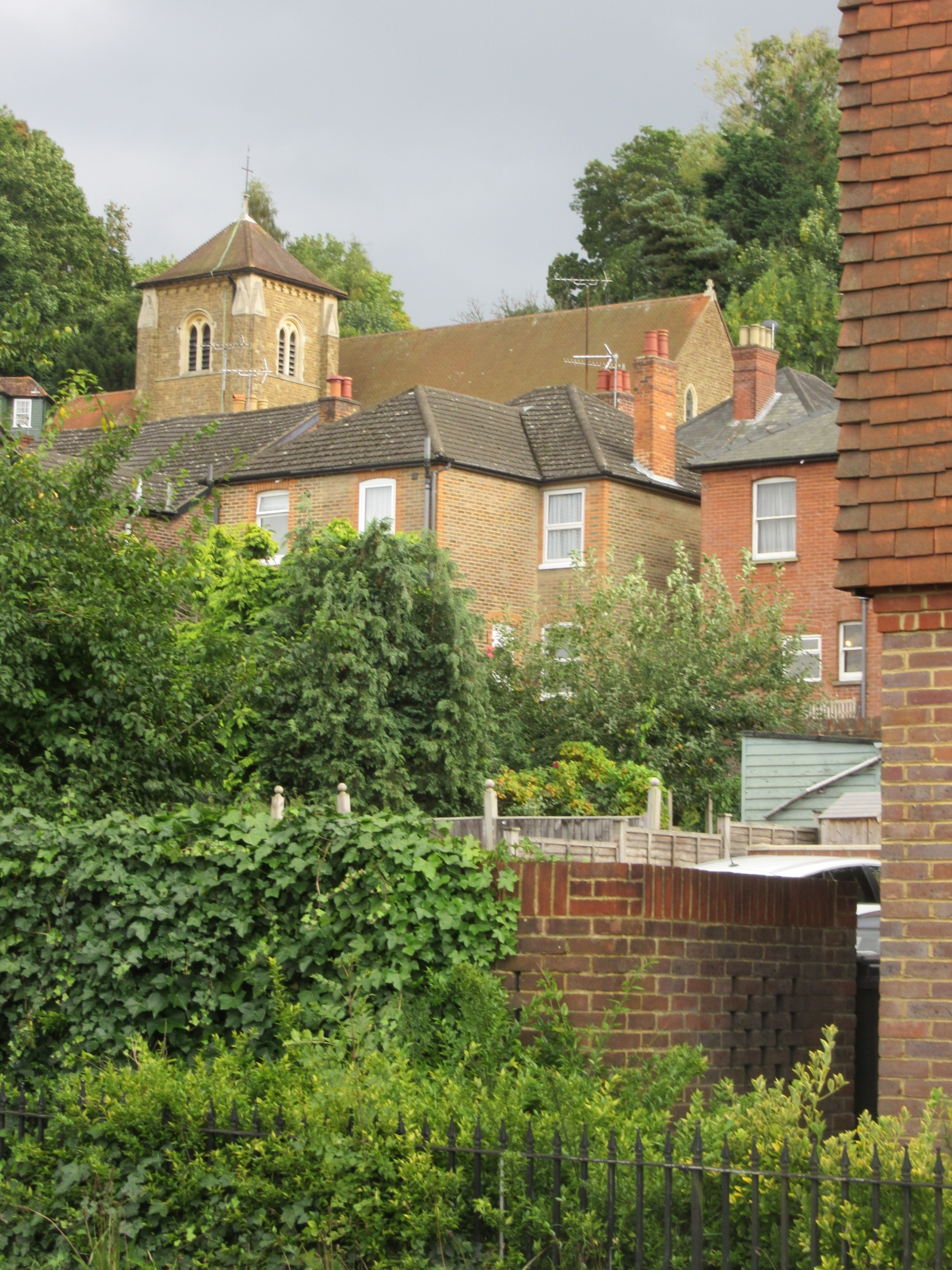
The church (seen here from Flambard Way) stands high above Godalming town centre on a steep hill.

Fr Hawkins was succeeded by Fr Maurice Pledger, under whose five-year ministry St Joseph's Church at Milford and the Church of Our Lady of Assumption in Elstead were opened. The parish now had three churches. Fr John McSheehy served for ten years from 1969 and established the first St Edmund's Catholic Primary School near Godalming town centre, and also opened dialogue with the Anglican Diocese of Guildford which culminated in Farncombe's Anglican church being used for weekly Catholic Masses, serving the population in the north of the parish. During Fr Tony Clarke's incumbency (1980–1990), a new St Edmund's School (Note: 51.17778°N 0.6042024°W) was built and plans were made for a large new church to be built alongside it: the aim was to replace St Edmund's Church, the daughter churches at Milford and Elstead (the latter closed in 1985) and the Mass centre at Farncombe with a single central place of worship for the whole parish. This never came to fruition, though, and land reserved for the proposed church next to the school (Note: 51.1779°N 0.6053°W) was sold for residential development. After Fr Clarke moved to St Mary of the Angels Church in Worthing, new priest Fr Bernard Rowley again took up the idea of centralising worship in a single church: he sought a site within Godalming town, and also considered the former Congregational chapel on Bridge Street which had been sold in 1977 and was in commercial use, but structural problems made it unsuitable for conversion back into a place of worship. Fr Michael Perry, who joined the parish in 1994, instead arranged for St Edmund's and St Joseph's churches to be refurbished and improved. The parish hall was sold in 1997 and was demolished in favour of a block of flats.

== Architecture ==
St Edmund King and Martyr's Church was designated a Grade II listed building on 1 February 1991. Such buildings are defined as "nationally important and of special interest". As of February 2001, it was one of 1,548 Grade II listed buildings and 1,661 listed buildings of all grades in the Borough of Waverley, the local government district in which Godalming is situated. It is one of several current and former places of worship in Godalming with listed status: Meadrow Unitarian Chapel, the Quaker meeting house on Mill Street, the former Salvation Army Hall on Mint Street (originally Congregational, and later Methodist) and the later Congregational church on Bridge Street (also no longer in religious use) are all Grade II-listed, and St Peter and St Paul's parish church has Grade I status.

Fr Hyland was "the inspiration and the driving force" behind St Edmund's Church, which was "very much his own church". He chose the site and may have influenced the design. Local tradition claims that it was built on the side of a steep hill overlooking the town so that even its short spire would reach higher than the tall steeple of the parish church, St Peter and St Paul's, which stands on low ground by the river; and Frederick Walters ensured it would "make the most of its dramatic hillside site". Walters designed churches in various architectural styles and could work with large or small budgets, but his work in the present Diocese of Arundel and Brighton (Note: Within the present Diocese he designed the Catholic churches at Petworth, Heron's Ghyll, Worthing, East Grinstead, Eastbourne, Haslemere and Camberley, the friary at Chilworth and additions to the churches at Brighton (St Joseph), Hove (Sacred Heart) and West Grinstead.) "suggests ... he was better at designing fairly plain buildings than more ornamental ones". St Edmund's Church is a simple, "austere" building which derives its effectiveness from the contrast between its strongly vertical emphasis (created by the large tower and high walls) and the high, steeply sloping site. The walls are 21.5 feet (6.6 m) tall, but the internal height is 40 feet (12 m) when measured to the apex of the roof. The church is 98.5 feet (30.0 m) long by 21.5 feet (6.6 m) wide. In style it is an Early English Gothic Revival building (Nikolaus Pevsner described it as "low-voltage Late Gothic") built of Bargate stone. This coarse, light-brown sandstone was quarried locally for many years and was used in many medieval and 19th-century churches. The walls are dressed with ashlar and the roof is tiled. Buttresses support the walls, tower and entrance porch, which is reached by a flight of steps and which leads into the nave. The doorway is set beneath a pointed (Gothic) arch with a hood mould and a panelled tympanum. All of the windows are narrow, tall lancets; those in the nave are flanked by buttresses and recessed below pointed arches. There are similar windows in three stages of the tower, which is topped by a pyramidal spire with a weather vane. There are two windows to the chancel, which has a vaulted roof; the nave roof has arch-braced trusses. A presbytery is linked to the chancel and the east end of the church; it was also built in 1906 and designed by Frederick Walters, but substantial alterations were carried out in 1957.

As originally built, the interior was very plain: most of the fittings post-date it by several years. The Lady Chapel of 1930 in the base of the tower is elaborately decorated with a carved reredos and rood screen of stone. Stencilwork patterns cover the ceiling and walls, and there is a Madonna statue. The chancel and nave are separated by a chamfered chancel arch with moulded columns and simple capitals. The High altar and carved reredos, which depicts saints Edmund, Ambrose, Gregory the Great, Jerome, Augustine of Hippo and Thomas of Canterbury, date from 1923. All of the stained glass windows are by Hardman & Co. except the west window which has been attributed to Geoffrey Webb and dated to 1937. This depicts Jesus flanked by St George and St Demetrius. Another, installed in 1922 and designed by Hardman & Co., depicts St Mary Magdalene. Their window of 1934 shows St John Fisher, Bishop of Rochester, and two others installed by them in 1950 represent the Annunciation, Assumption of Mary and the Visitation, and the Nativity of Jesus, the Coronation of the Virgin and the Presentation of Jesus at the Temple. The 14 Stations of the Cross were donated anonymously in 1907 and are of a rare bas-relief design. The font was presented to the church anonymously in the same year. The organ was bought in 1996 to replace a secondhand instrument acquired from St George's Cathedral, Southwark.

== Parish, other churches and administration ==
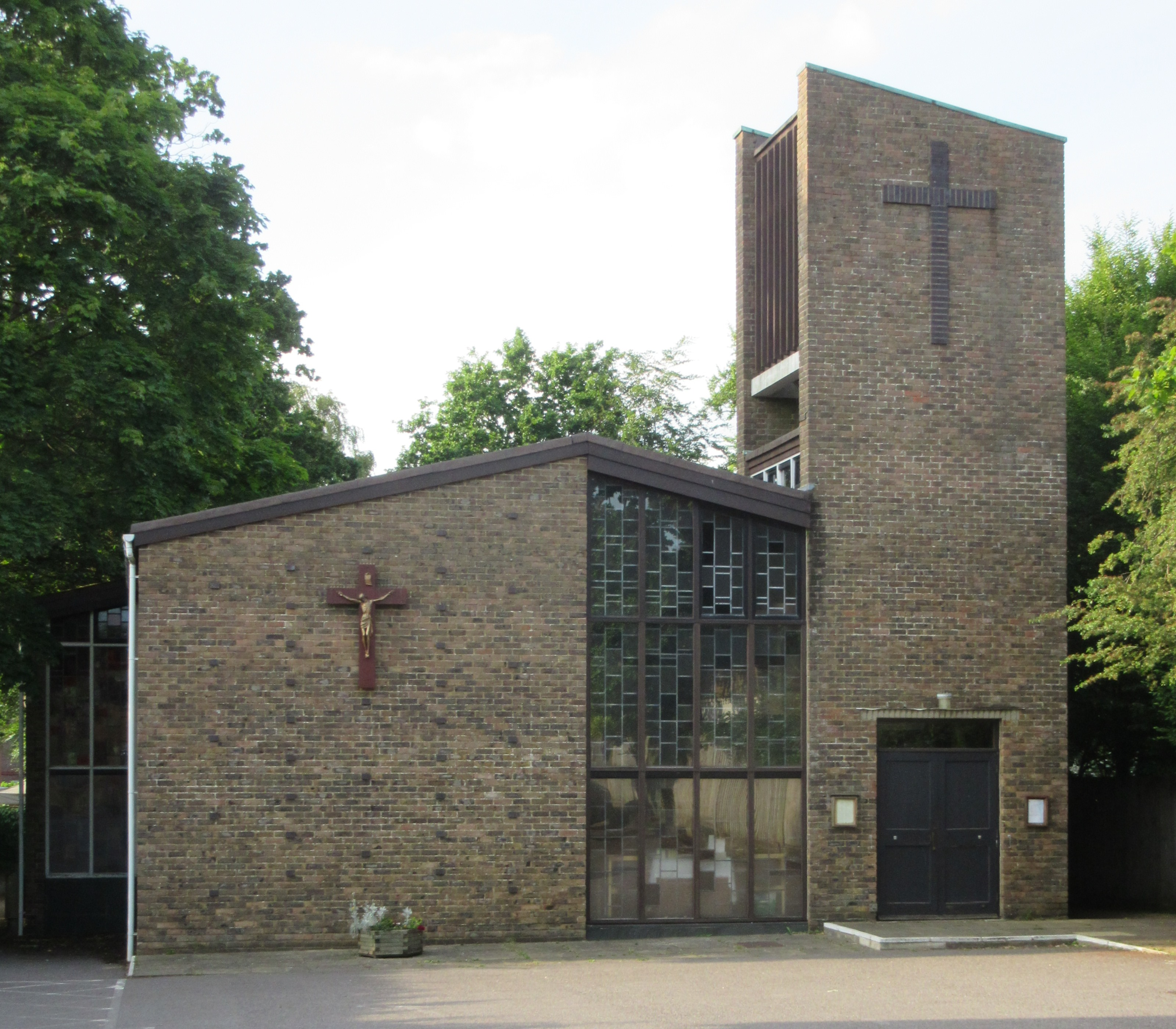
St Joseph's Church, Milford (built 1967–68) is a daughter church within the parish.

Godalming parish is one of seven within the Deanery of Guildford, one of 13 deaneries in the Diocese of Arundel and Brighton. The parish covers a large area of southwest Surrey—about 100 square miles (260 km^{2})—but was originally even bigger, spanning a vast rural area from Hindhead in the southwest to Cranleigh in the northeast. In its present form it is bounded by the parishes of Guildford to the north, Cranleigh & Bramley to the east, Haslemere to the south and Farnham to the west. There are now three Catholic congregations within the parish: St Edmund's has a daughter church at Milford, and there is an arrangement for Mass to be said at the Anglican church in Farncombe. As of 1999, monthly Masses were also said at Ladywell Convent (Note: 51.171923°N 0.618378°W) on the southern edge of Godalming and at the Hydon Hill Leonard Cheshire Disability Hospice (Note: 51.156455°N 0.605369°W) in Busbridge. The church also serves Milford Hospital, (Note: 51.16707°N 0.625649°W) formerly the Surrey County Sanatorium. There was another daughter church at Elstead until 1985, and Masses open to the public have sometimes been offered at the chapel of Barrow Hills School, (Note: 51.151282°N 0.656425°W) a Catholic preparatory school between Godalming and Witley. During the 1920s, public Mass was occasionally said at Captain Rushbrooke's private chapel at Cosford House in Bowlhead Green.

Haslemere was the first parish to be carved out of the original St Edmund's parish. A Mass centre was founded there in 1908, but no church building was provided initially—the back room of a pub was used for worship. In 1924 it was allocated its own parish and priest, and the present Church of Our Lady of Lourdes was completed in August of that year (again to the design of Frederick Walters). Bramley was in Godalming parish until 1955; the present Church of St Thomas More dates from 1959 and is now part of a joint parish with Cranleigh.

St Joseph's Church (Note: 51.17329°N 0.649018°W) is in Milford, a village south of Godalming. A parishioner at St Edmund's donated land, formerly an orchard, next to his house in 1957, and fundraising began: parishioners were asked to donate to a building fund which was also used to pay for the now demolished church at Elstead. Construction started in 1967 and continued into 1969; the local firm of David Fry were the building contractors, as they were more than 60 years previously at St Edmund's. The church was designed by Henry Bingham Towner and Partners and has a simple design with a tower to one side, clerestory lighting and seating on three sides around a central altar. It was consecrated on Saint Joseph's Day, 19 March 1999.

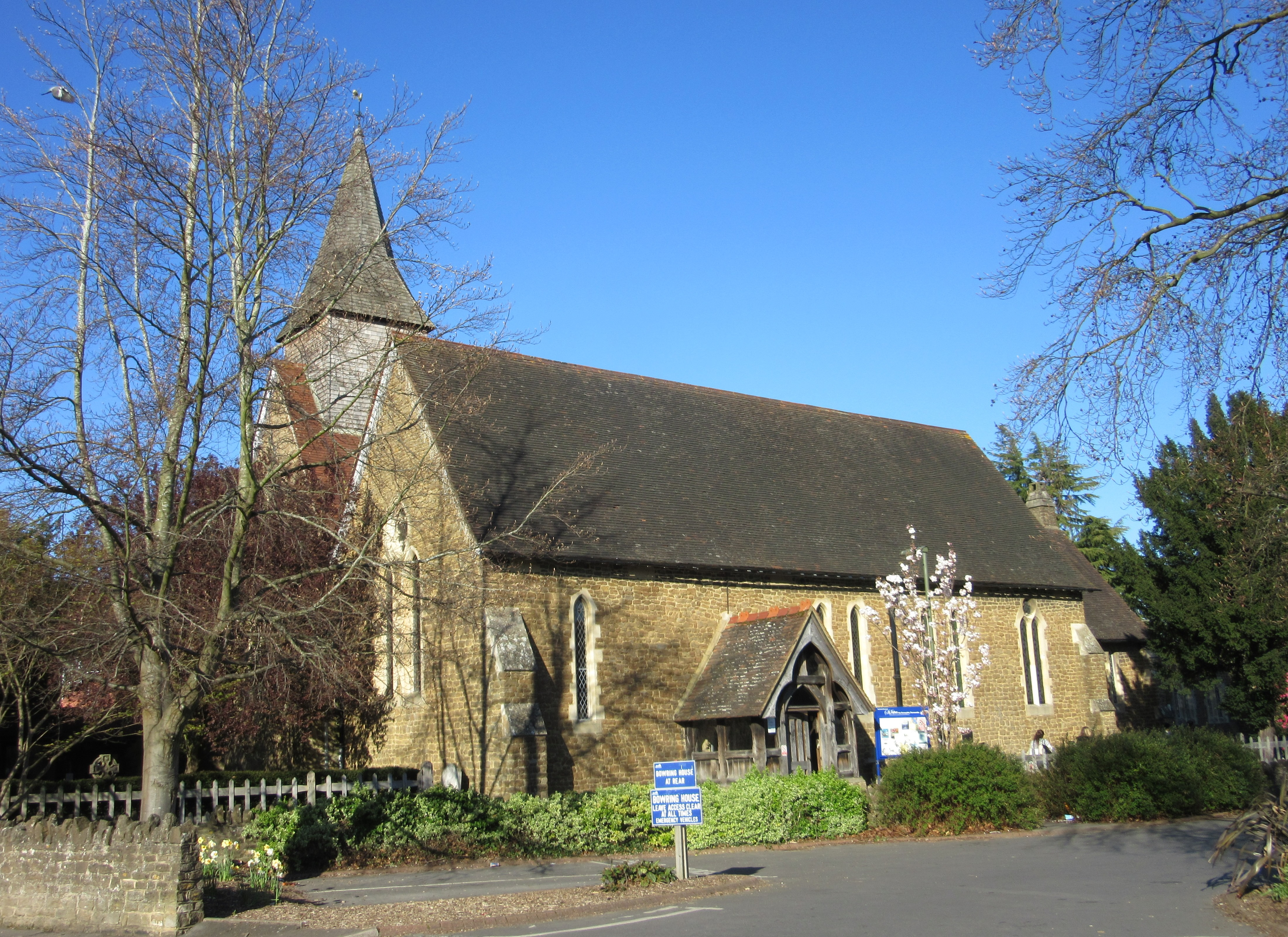
Catholic Mass has been celebrated at the Anglican St John the Evangelist's Church in Farncombe since 1973.

In Farncombe the parish priest of St Edmund's says Mass for the local Catholic population in the Anglican Church of St John the Evangelist. (Note: 51.195762°N 0.603685°W) The need for a Mass centre in the north of the parish was first discussed in November 1971, and after extensive consultation with the Anglican community a trial Mass was held at St John the Evangelist's on 11 March 1973. Its success was repeated when further trials took place in summer 1974, and the Bishop of Dorking Kenneth Evans formalised the arrangement in November that year.

Money from the weekly building fund started by Fr Denis Hawkins in 1964 was used both for St Joseph's Church in Milford and for the construction of a permanent church in Elstead, a village between Godalming and Farnham. Before World War II, a resident of Elstead named Colonel Fitzgerald petitioned Bishop of Southwark Peter Amigo to ask for Mass to be celebrated in the village. Canon Hyland of St Edmund's Church agreed to send a curate, and Fitzgerald himself fitted up the upper storey of a barn to create a temporary chapel. This was used until 1953, when a hall formerly owned by The Royal British Legion was converted into a chapel. This building was dilapidated even then, though, so in 1968 a prefabricated building was purchased and became the Church of Our Lady of the Assumption. (Note: 51.177864°N 0.706345°W) It was also used as a hall. A shortage of priests in the 1980s meant the church could no longer be served, and the last Mass was said in 1985. The building (Note: An early-1980s photograph of the church showed a long building with a low-pitched roof, a small cross on the gable and a recessed entrance below wooden panelling.) stood until 1992, when it was demolished and replaced with a detached house.

In 2015, no Sunday Masses were held at St Edmund's Church: a Vigil Mass takes place at 6.00pm on Saturdays. There are three Masses of Holy Days of Obligation, one of which is in Polish. One Sunday Mass takes place at St Joseph's Church in Milford (10.15 am) and the Anglican church in Farncombe (8.45 am). Rev. Mirosław Slawicki, one of three Polish priests serving the Diocese of Arundel and Brighton, is based at St Joseph's Church. Two Sunday Masses are said in Polish there each week, and he also celebrates Mass at Horsham and Guildford. A diocesan review of the parish in 2006 stated that the average weekly Mass attendance across all three churches in the parish was 427. The seating capacity of St Edmund's Church was stated as 188, St Joseph's was given as 192 and St John the Evangelist's at Farncombe was 200. Average weekly attendance figures across all churches in the parish are known for 1910 (138 people; only St Edmund's Church existed then), the mid-1960s (900 across Godalming, Milford and Elstead churches) and 1999 (426 across Godalming, Milford and Farncombe).

St Edmund's Church is licensed for worship in accordance with the Places of Worship Registration Act 1855 and has the registration number 42119. It was registered for the solemnisation of marriages on 14 January 1908.

== See also ==
- List of places of worship in Waverley (borough)
- Roman Catholic Diocese of Arundel and Brighton

== Bibliography ==
- Head, Ronald (1990). Godalming in Old Picture Postcards. Vol. 2. Zaltbommel: European Library. ISBN 90-288-4965-3.
- Kelly, Bernard W. (1907). Historical Notes on English Catholic Missions (PDF). London: Kegan Paul, Trench, Trübner & Co.
- Nairn, Ian; Pevsner, Nikolaus (1971) [1962]. The Buildings of England: Surrey (2nd ed.). Harmondsworth: Penguin Books. ISBN 0-300-09675-5.
- Polack, Bernard; Whitbourn, John (1999). The Catholic Parish of St Edmund King & Martyr, Godalming, 1899–1999. Farnham: Arrow Press.
- Sladen, Teresa; Antram, Nicholas (11 November 2005). Architectural and Historic Review of Churches in the Roman Catholic Diocese of Arundel and Brighton (PDF) (Report). English Heritage.
- The Diocese of Arundel & Brighton (2015). Diocese of Arundel & Brighton Diocesan Directory 2015. Crawley: Roman Catholic Diocese of Arundel and Brighton.
