= Godalming Friends Meeting House =

Quaker meeting house in Surrey, England

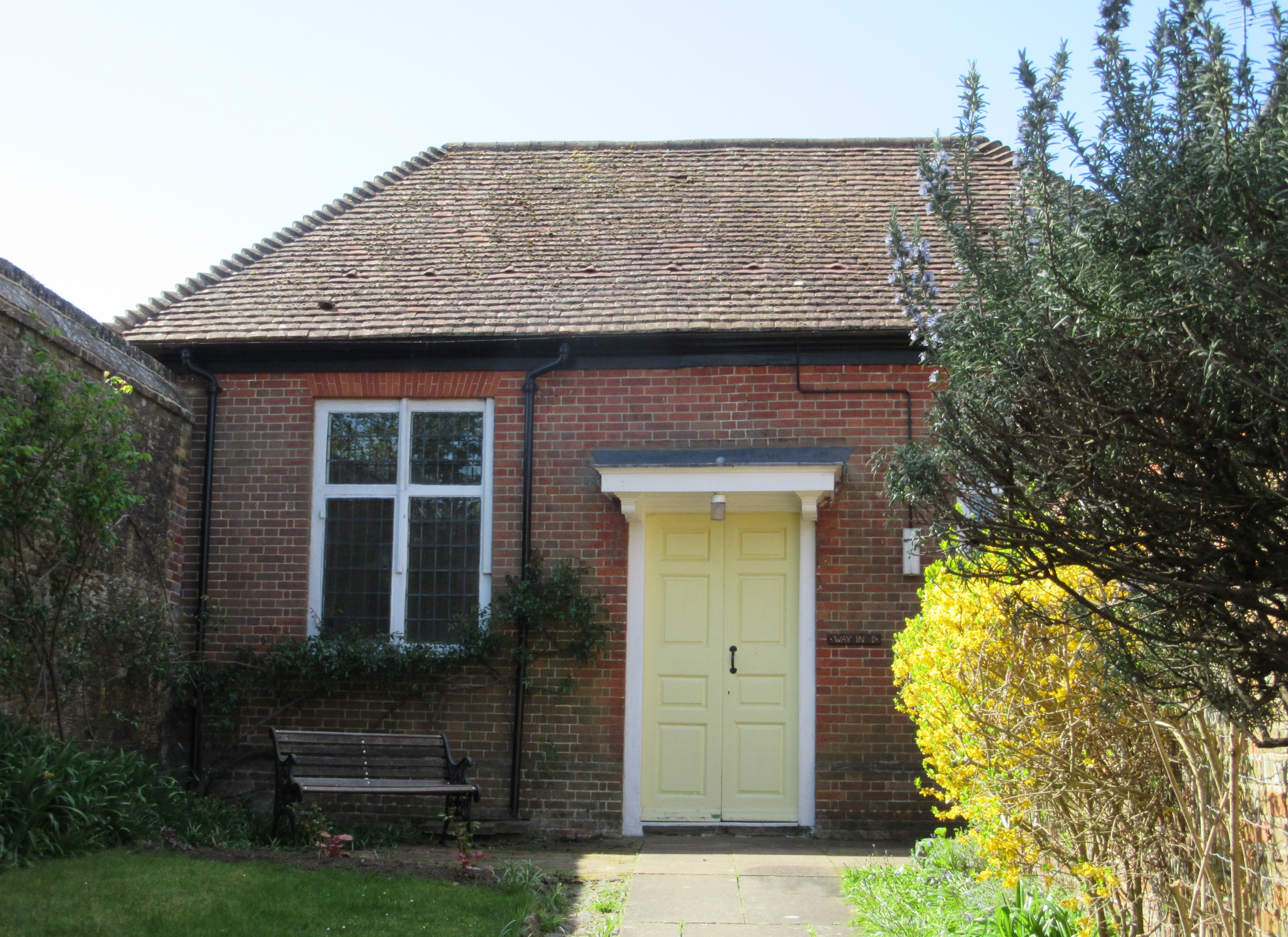
- The meeting house from the south-southeast

Location map and quick summary
Location within Surrey
51.185303°N 0.617744°W
Location	The Mint, Mill Lane, Godalming, Surrey GU7 1HB
Country	England
Denomination	Quaker
History
Status	Friends meeting house
Founded	c. 1687
Architecture
Functional status	Open
Heritage designation	Grade II
Designated	18 December 1947
Completed	1715 or 1748
Closed	1868 (reopened 1926)
Specifications
Length	27.5 feet (8.4 m)
Width	26 feet (7.9 m)
Materials	Red brick, Bargate stone, tiles

Godalming Friends Meeting House is a Friends meeting house (Quaker place of worship) in the ancient town of Godalming in the English county of Surrey. One of many Nonconformist places of worship in the town, it dates from 1748 but houses a congregation whose roots go back nearly a century earlier. Decline set in during the 19th century and the meeting house passed out of Quaker use for nearly 60 years, but in 1926 the cause was reactivated and since then an unbroken history of Quaker worship has been maintained. Many improvements were carried out in the 20th century to the simple brick-built meeting house, which is Grade II-listed in view of its architectural and historical importance.

== Early history ==
Quakers were one of the dissenting religious groups to emerge after the English Civil War in the mid-17th century. At that time Godalming, a centuries-old industrial town on the River Wey in the southwest of Surrey, was "overwhelmingly Puritan in belief and practice". The parish was extremely large, meaning that the incumbent at the Church of England parish church (St Peter and St Paul's) saw little of his parishioners; and his Anglo-Catholic views were unpopular and out of step with the beliefs of many locals. Therefore, by the 1660s, Nonconformist conventicles (unofficial, informal religious meetings led by laypersons) had a substantial following in Godalming. One, which attracted up to 500 people weekly, was held at a house in Eashing (west of Godalming) belonging to the brother of a Quaker called Henry Gill. This developed out of an earlier conventicle at Binscombe Manor on the north side of Godalming, the property of Thomas Patching. He was converted to the Quaker cause by the preaching of the denomination's founder George Fox at Ifield in West Sussex—an early centre for the Quaker cause where a Friends meeting house (still in use) was opened in 1676. Patching inherited Binscombe Manor in the late 1650s and held regular Quaker meetings at a barn on the estate. A Quaker burial ground was established next to it in 1659. Fox himself preached at Binscombe, as did other early Quaker leaders. Describing a journey into Surrey in 1655, Fox wrote "we passed on [from Reigate] to Thomas Patching's, of Binscombe in Godalming, where we had a meeting, to which several Friends came from London". Patching was arrested in 1660 for failing to pay parish tithes, and died soon afterwards. Henry Gill, who then took up the Quaker cause at Binscombe, was arrested on the same charge and had property seized. More Quakers were prosecuted throughout the rest of the 17th century. Meetings later moved to the home of Ezra Gill (Henry Gill's brother), Jordans, in Eashing. Some were also held at Henry Gill's own home, the location of which is now unknown. Gill had in 1658 published a pamphlet entitled Warning and Visitation to the Inhabitants of Godalming which encouraged the town's residents to follow the Quaker cause. The following year, a group of Quakers in the town "were much beaten and abused, and put into the cage there ... for opposition to the priest".

The burial ground at Binscombe Manor continued in use throughout this period. Many local Quakers were buried there, including Thomas Patching who had originally made the land available. The arrangement was formalised in 1695 when his son Resta Patching granted the Quaker community a 2,000-year lease on the burial ground at a nominal rent. The growth of the community across west Surrey at this time is demonstrated by the number of towns and villages represented among the 70 burials: Guildford, Godalming, Farncombe, Shalford, Merrow, Albury, Wonersh, Bramley, Witley, Elstead, Hurtmore, Compton, Ewhurst, Dunsfold and St Martha.

== Meeting house ==
The present Friends meeting house traces its origins to 1698, when local man Caleb Woods bought the Mill House on Mill Lane. In 1702 he acquired the adjacent house, barn, garden and orchard, and a year earlier he was one of the contributors to a fund for the meeting house. A document (still in existence) dated 1701 records nine names and subscriptions totalling £15.10s. Evidence from Woods's will suggests that the money was used to convert the buildings on his land into a place of worship rather than to build a separate meeting house. In 1715 a trust was set up to administer the meeting house, and Woods's son, also called Caleb, received £30 from the five trustees for "all that messuage tenement and building now used for a meeteing house [sic] ... and the backside and garden therewith". It is not known when the buildings were first used as a place of worship, but the existence of a carved piece of wood inscribed with Friends Meeting House 1714 suggests it was already in use by that date.

Sources vary on when the present meeting house was built to replace it. A date of 1748 is usually claimed, but other sources give 1715 as the year (suggesting a new meeting house was built immediately after the trustees took ownership of the Mill House); and it is also claimed that "the red brick, Bargate stone, tiled roof and lattice windows of the meeting house are consistent with a late-17th-century date", suggesting the Mill House itself was remodelled rather than being demolished and replaced. In 1752 a burial ground was created behind the meeting house, replacing the old graveyard at Binscombe. In about 1772 an extra section, consisting of a narrow wing separate from the main meeting house, was added. Minor repairs to the building were carried out in 1776–77, for which the debt was paid off in 1778. At this time, and until about 1800, the main monthly meeting alternated between Godalming and the Friends meeting house at nearby Guildford. Quarterly meetings covering the whole of Surrey were also occasionally held at Godalming. The close links with Guildford were strengthened in 1803 when "Godalming Quakers subscribed generously to the fund" for Guildford's new meeting house, under construction at the time: more than £100 was raised by the nine members of the Godalming 50-strong congregation. As well as the monthly meetings shared with Guildford, there were regular meetings for worship on Sunday mornings and during the week, although minutes kept during the 19th century suggest the latter were not well attended.

The burial ground behind the meeting house was said to have room for only 16 more graves in 1836, but burials continued until 1890. In 1864 the old burial ground at Binscombe was sold for £30 to the owner of the Loseley Park estate. Meanwhile, the meeting was in decline: Sunday afternoon worship ceased in 1852, the monthly meetings stopped taking place at Godalming in 1859 and was held at Guildford each month instead; by 1864 no members of the Godalming congregation attended it; and in 1868 worship ceased altogether at Godalming when the congregation had fallen to three, all of whom were elderly. The meeting house stood empty for some years, but it was later rented to a Plymouth Brethren congregation for 1s. per year.

The building was still owned by Quaker trustees until 1923, when it was sold to Francis Ashby. He was also a Quaker, and after his death in 1926 it was conveyed back to the local Quaker community, which had grown again by this time, for £200. Meetings were restarted at this time. The congregation again fell to only a few members in the 1930s, but at that time Godalming became a popular retirement destination for wealthy people, and several new residents began worshipping at the meeting house. The new headmaster of Godalming Grammar School was also a Quaker and joined the congregation. By 1938 the meeting house was able to rejoin the monthly meeting, which by this time covered the meeting houses at Guildford, Dorking and Horsham. (From 1961 monthly meetings began to alternate between Guildford and Godalming again.) A 250th-anniversary celebration was held on 19 July 1964, when the other Christian groups in Godalming were invited to an ecumenical service at the meeting house, and also in the mid-1960s a former Quaker meeting at Haslemere was discontinued and its members transferred to Godalming. In 1969 there were proposals for the construction of a ring road, which would have threatened "the whole of [the] attractive, quiet area" around Mill Lane, but these came to nothing. Repairs had been carried out in 1938, and a further £26,000 was spent on improvement works in 1991.

The meeting house was designated a Grade II listed building on 18 December 1947. Such buildings are defined as "nationally important and of special interest". As of February 2001, it was one of 1,548 Grade II listed buildings and 1,661 listed buildings of all grades in the Borough of Waverley, the local government district in which Godalming is situated. It is one of several current and former places of worship in Godalming with listed status: St Edmund's Roman Catholic Church, Meadrow Unitarian Chapel, the former Salvation Army Hall on Mint Street (originally Congregational, and later Methodist) and the later Congregational church on Bridge Street (also no longer in religious use) are all Grade II-listed, and St Peter and St Paul's parish church has Grade I status.

The meeting house is licensed for worship in accordance with the Places of Worship Registration Act 1855 and has the registration number 49902.

== Architecture ==
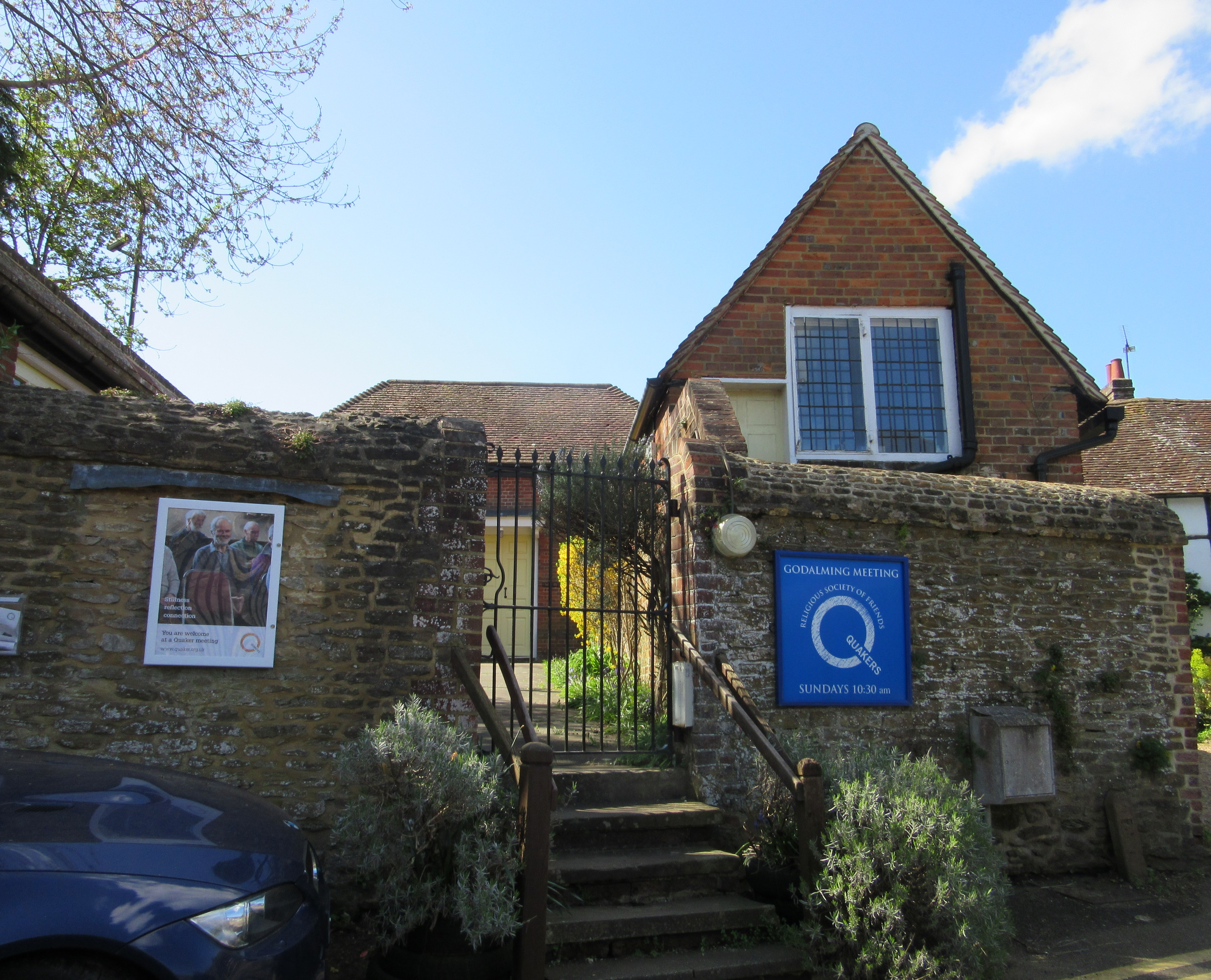
View of the meeting house from outside the grounds.

The Friends meeting house is "a simple 18th-century brick building", similar in appearance to the series of old meeting houses elsewhere in Surrey such as Capel (1724), Guildford (1805), Esher (1793) and Dorking (1846, replacing a building of 1709). The walls are mostly of red brick laid in the Flemish bond pattern, with some vitrified brickwork. Some of the lower courses of brickwork are galleted. There is also some Bargate stone, and the roof is laid with tiles and is of a hipped design. The centrally placed eight-panelled door is recessed into a doorway below a hood mould supported on corbels. It is flanked by one straight-headed casement window on each side. The rear wall, on which the brickwork is galleted, also has a central doorway flanked by cross-framed windows, and a second doorway gives access to a staircase which leads to a loft. This staircase immediately adjoins the neighbouring cottage. On the rear wall, several bricks have been inscribed with the year 1748 and members' initials. Likewise, in the annexe, the year 1772 and sets of initials are visible on several bricks.

The narrow wing built c. 1772 was extended and converted into a women's meeting room in 1808. It was originally detached, but after the meeting room reopened a connecting lobby was built in the mid-20th century to link the room (which had been converted into a classroom, but which later became a kitchen) to the main meeting house. This annexe is smaller and narrower than the meeting house and stands in front of it to the right. The interior has three bays corresponding to these openings. The ceiling is plastered and has a moulded cornice. The room was originally partitioned, but only a wooden beam across the roof (supported on a centrally placed timber post) shows where this was.

== Burial ground ==
The old burial ground in Binscombe Lane (51.204351°N 0.616811°E) is in the present suburb of Binscombe. Its original walls survive and are Grade II-listed. There were 188 burials there during more than a century of use, but no graves or monuments are visible. The last burial was in 1790. In 1988 a plaque was fixed to the wall to commemorate the history of the burial ground. The barn next to the burial ground, in which Thomas Patching arranged regular meetings in the 1650s and where George Fox preached, survives but has been converted into a house.

The first burial at the new burial ground behind the meeting house was in 1709 and was of a resident of Bramley, Jane Chandler. A transcript at the Surrey History Centre records all burials between then and 1890 (Mary Dudley—"this is the last interment allowed"). Names occurring frequently include Boxall, Constable, Dawes, Kidd, Peto, Sweetapple, Trimmer and Waring. Most people were local but others came from Worcester, Deal and London.

== See also ==
- Media related to Friends Meeting House, Godalming at Wikimedia Commons
- List of places of worship in Waverley (borough)
