= Godalming Congregational Church =

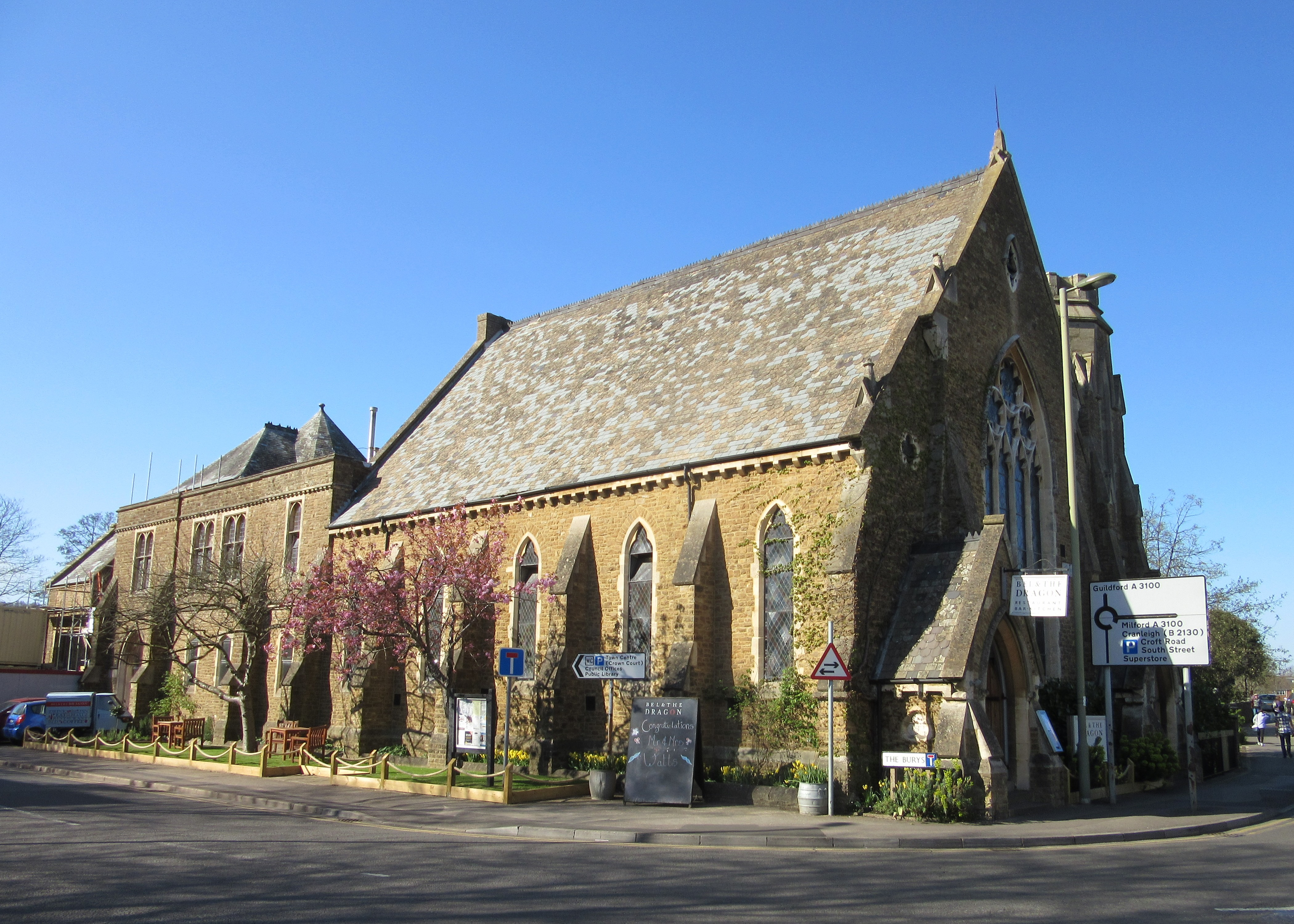
- The former chapel and schoolroom in 2015 after conversion into a restaurant

Location map and quick summary
Location within Surrey
51°11′14″N 0°36′32″W
OS grid reference	SU 97309 44042
Location	Bridge Street, Godalming, Surrey GU7 1HY
Country	England
Denomination	Congregational
History
Founded	c. 1730 (in another building)
Architecture
Functional status	Closed
Heritage designation	Grade II
Designated	1 February 1991
Architect	William F. Poulton
Style	Gothic Revival
Groundbreaking	27 May 1868
Completed	28 October 1868
Construction cost	£3,600
Closed	1977

Specifications
- Materials: Bargate stone, ashlar

The building formerly known as Godalming Congregational Church was the Congregational chapel serving the ancient town of Godalming, in the English county of Surrey, between 1868 and 1977. It superseded an earlier chapel, which became Godalming's Salvation Army hall, and served a congregation which could trace its origins to the early 18th century. The "imposing suite of buildings", on a major corner site next to the Town Bridge over the River Wey, included a schoolroom and a manse (now demolished), and the chapel had a landmark spire until just before its closure in 1977. At that time the congregation transferred to the nearby Methodist chapel, which became a joint Methodist and United Reformed church with the name Godalming United Church. The former chapel then became an auction gallery before being converted into a restaurant; then in 2018 the premises were let to the Cotswold Company to be converted into a furniture and home accessories showroom. In 1991 the former chapel was listed at Grade II for its architectural and historical importance.

== History ==
Godalming is an ancient industrial town in which Protestant Nonconformism was a dominant force from the 17th century. Conventicles attracting hundreds of worshippers were held regularly from the mid-1650s, despite official opposition and punitive sanctions. These groups gradually developed into more formal meetings along denominational lines, and chapels and meeting houses were built around the town.

A group which followed Congregational polity bought land in 1729 on Hart's Lane (now Mint Street) and built a chapel named Ebenezer. It was extended in 1821 and rebuilt in 1830 as the congregation grew, and it continued to thrive throughout the 19th century through the efforts of the Surrey Congregational Mission and ministers such as John Nelson Goulty, an unordained student from Homerton College, Cambridge who went on to become a prominent pastor at Union Chapel, Brighton. By 1867—despite a period of "trial and discouragement for the church" with no permanent pastor, and the recent (1862) completion of renovation work—the congregation decided that Ebenezer Chapel was too small, and plans were made for a new building on a better site. Thomas Davies, the minister, started a subscription fund in January 1867, and a Mr Thomas Simpson "threw himself into the movement" by offering £600. The church paid £633 for a site next to the Town Bridge on Bridge Street, and received £450 from Methodists who bought Ebenezer Chapel for their use. The first stone of the new church was laid on 27 May 1868 by Mr T. Barnes, and the 450-capacity building was ready five months later: the first service was held on 28 October 1868. It cost about £3,600. More land was bought to the rear in 1879, and the church spent £2,500 on a two-storey schoolroom with integral hall. This was built in 1883 and opened on 27 March 1884. An early photograph shows a wooden gallery around the upper floor and rows of wooden seats with a desk at the front. A house next to the church was bought and turned into a manse for the minister.

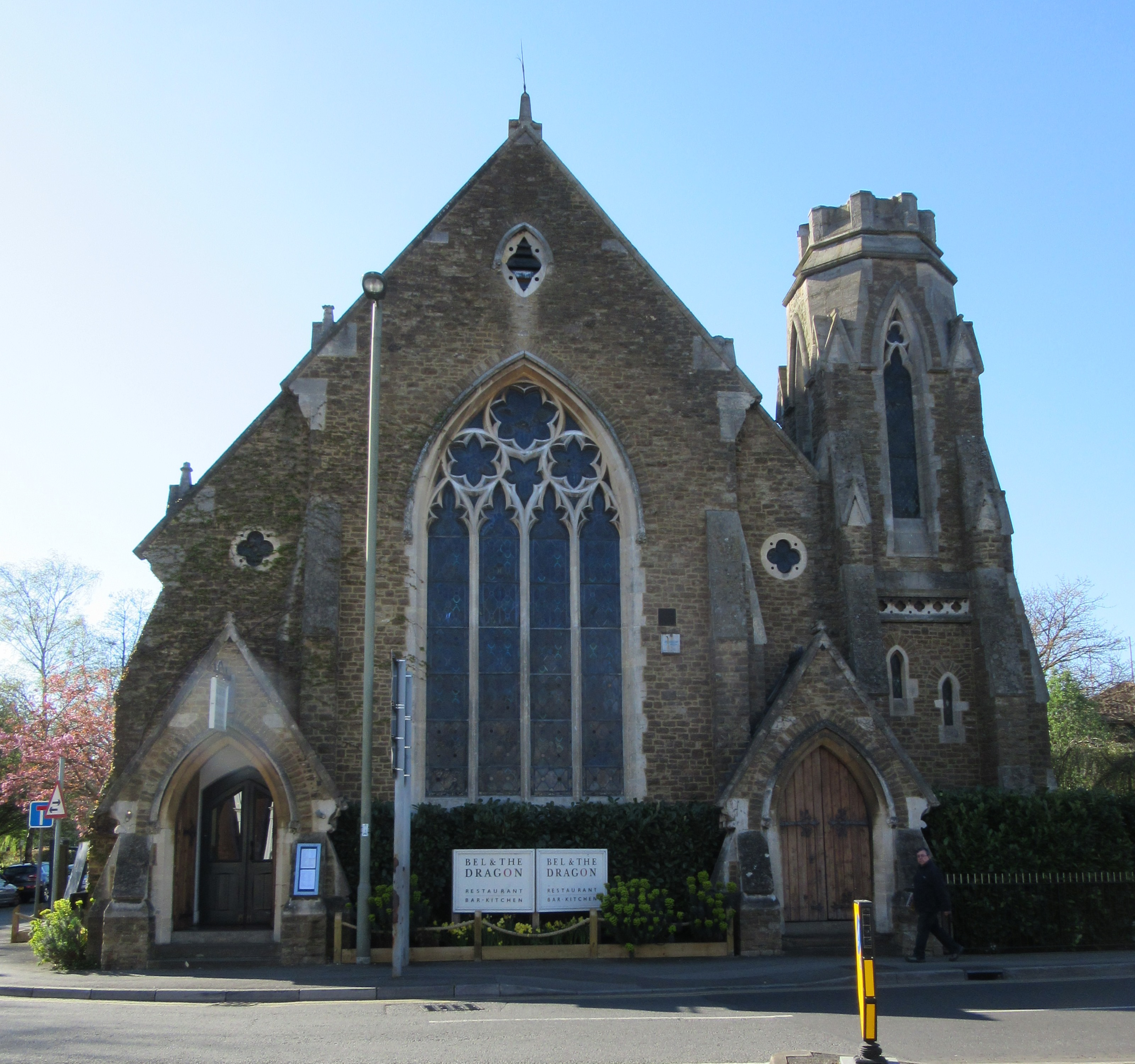
The tower (right) lost its spire c. 1969.

The church was responsible for founding or taking charge of several other Congregational mission chapels in the surrounding villages. One was founded at Elstead in October 1834, when members of Ebenezer Chapel left to establish a formal church there (Congregational services had taken place informally in the village since 1821, when a chapel was erected to provide a venue for services which had previously been held outdoors in nearby Tilford). A new chapel was built in 1845. After a period of being looked after by Farnham Congregational Church, Godalming took charge again from 1890. It remains in use as a United Reformed church. In 1870 Godalming Congregational Church took responsibility for the chapel at Wormley, a hamlet near Witley. The first chapel was originally Independent in character and was built in 1836. The site, which had been leased, was purchased in 1866 and a new chapel was built two years later for £250, after which it became another "out-station" of Godalming. It closed in the 20th century and is now part of the adjacent King Edward's School. At Milford, a Congregational church which began with house meetings in 1856 moved to a shed-like wooden chapel in 1860 and then a secondhand tin tabernacle in 1872. At that point it was taken over by Godalming Congregational Church and became another out-station. A "handsome chapel of Bargate stone" was erected in 1902. This closed in the late 20th century and was sold to a Baptist congregation, and is now known as Milford Baptist Church.

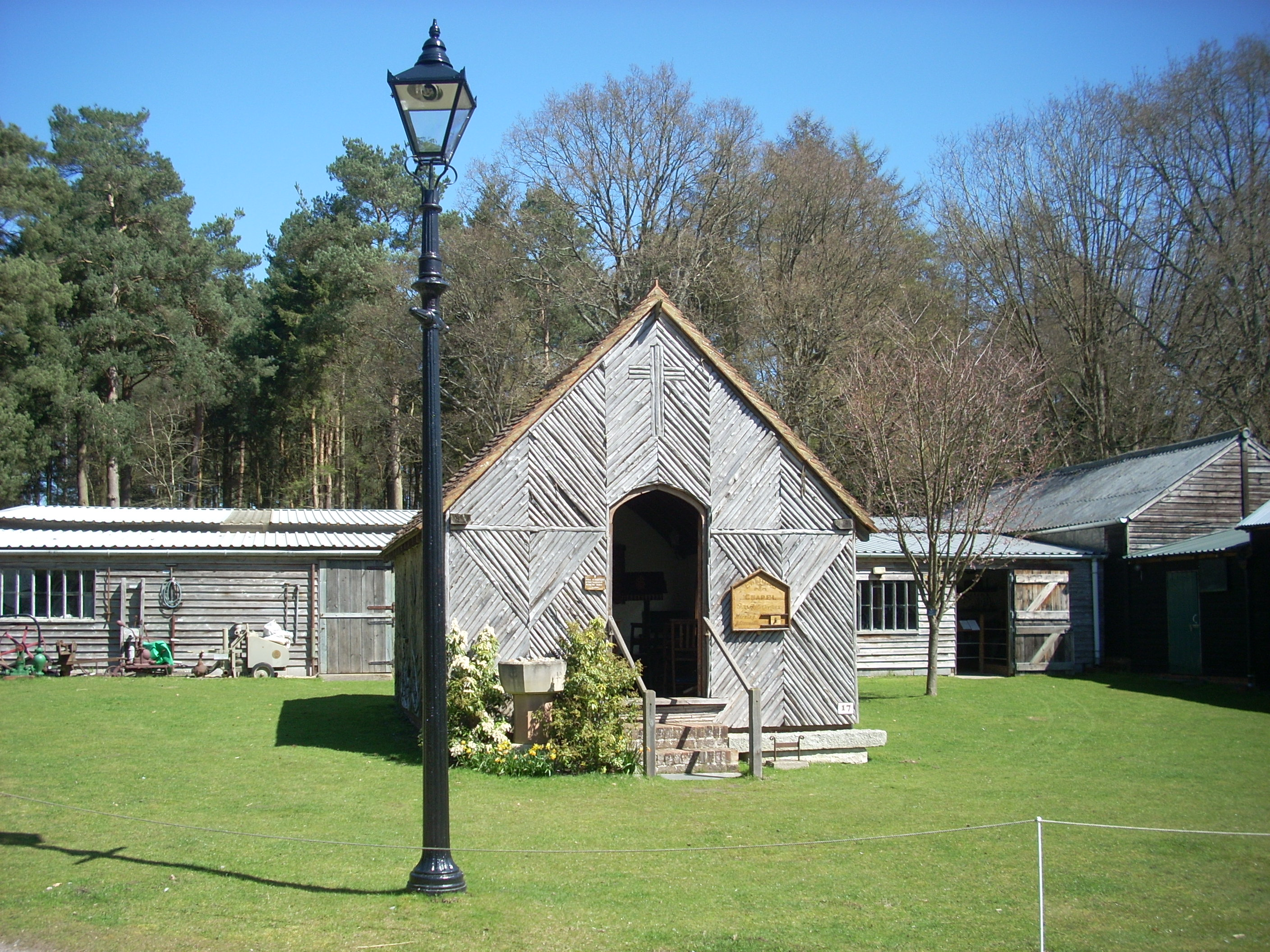
Eashing chapel

At Eashing, west of Godalming, a wooden chapel was erected in 1858 and was served from Godalming from 1866. The modest building, which also had a Sunday school, was dismantled and has been re-erected at the Rural Life Living Museum in Tilford. There was also a Congregational chapel at Bowlhead Green near Thursley, which was run from Godalming during the late 19th century but which had to close in 1906 when the building was left to a relative of the founder rather than, as had been expected, in trust to Godalming Congregational Church,.

The church experienced "a century of varying fortunes" until its closure in 1977. The iron railings around the church were requisitioned for the war effort during World War II, and the manse was sold and converted into a doctor's surgery, then demolished to make way for Godalming's public library (which opened in 1965). The landmark spire, which rose from the corner tower, became structurally unsafe and had to be removed in about 1969. In 1977, the decision was taken to unite with Godalming Methodist Church, whose chapel on the opposite side of Bridge Street had opened in 1903. The congregations formed Godalming United Church, a joint Methodist and United Reformed congregation (the Congregational Church had joined several other groups in 1972 to form this new denomination), and transferred their worship to the 1903 chapel.

The last service at the Congregational chapel was held on 25 December 1977, and the building was sold soon afterwards. It became a furniture auction house, but in the early 2000s it was refurbished and turned into a restaurant. It was latterly part of the Bel and the Dragon chain, which by 2015 had seven restaurants across Surrey, Hampshire and Berkshire. In September 2018 the building was acquired by The Cotswold Company, a retailer of handmade furniture. The building, including the former schoolroom at the rear, is to be converted into a furniture and home accessories showroom.

Under the name Former Congregational Church and attached Sunday School, now Messenger May Baverstock Premises, the complex of buildings were listed at Grade II on 1 February 1991. Such buildings are defined as "nationally important and of special interest". As of February 2001, it was one of 1,548 Grade II listed buildings and 1,661 listed buildings of all grades in the Borough of Waverley, the local government district in which Godalming is situated. It is one of several current and former places of worship in Godalming with listed status: St Edmund's Roman Catholic Church, Meadrow Unitarian Chapel, the Quaker meeting house on Mill Street, and the original Congregational chapel (latterly the Salvation Army Hall) on Mint Street are all Grade II-listed, and St Peter and St Paul's parish church has Grade I status.

== Architecture ==
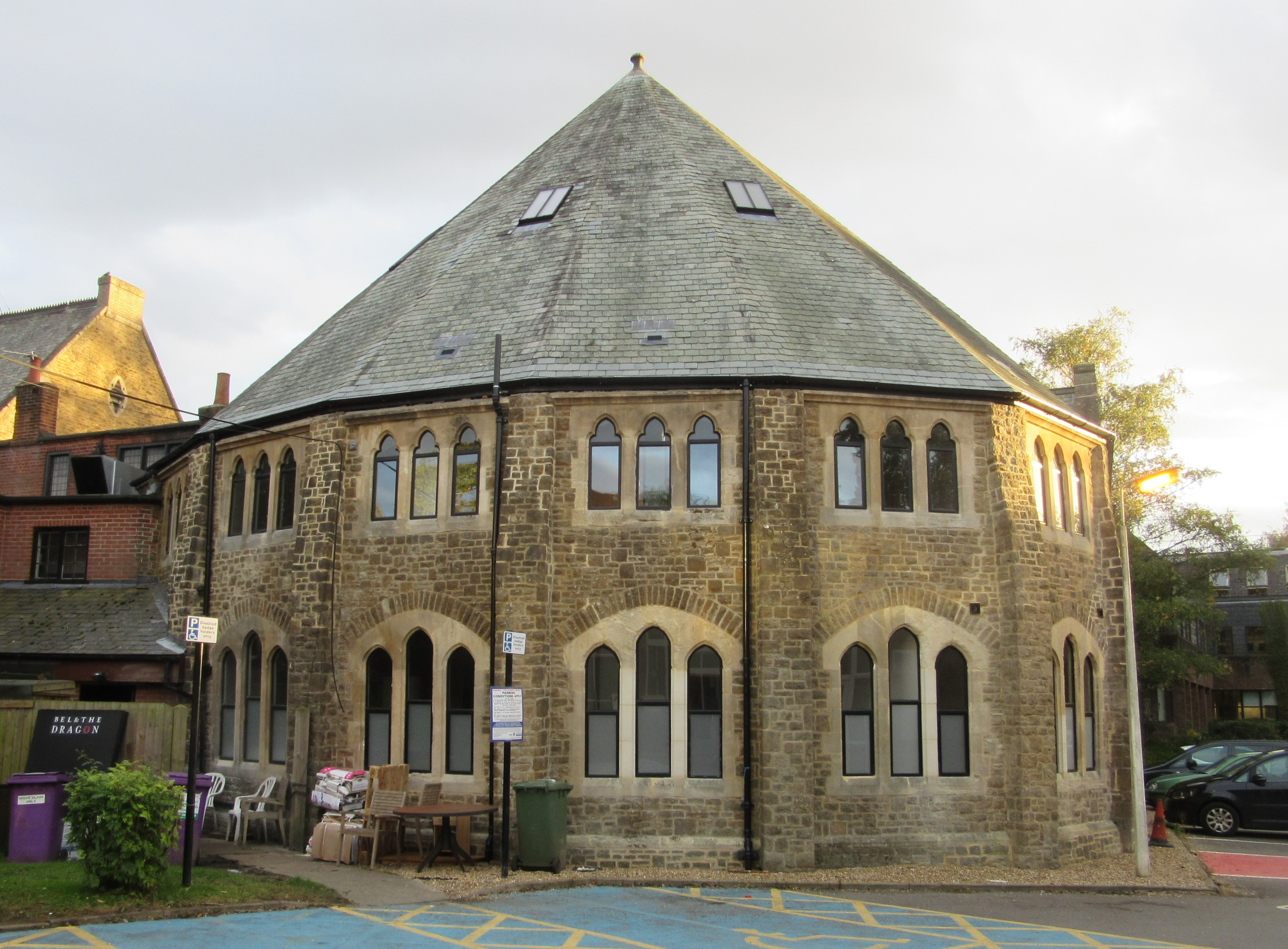
The rearmost section of the mission room is polygonal.

The church, described by Nikolaus Pevsner as "picturesque from a distance", was designed by William F. Poulton of the Reading-based firm Poulton and Woodman. A "popular designer of Congregational churches", Poulton and his firm were among a group of "uniquely qualified specialists" regularly used by Nonconformist churches in the Victorian era to build or remodel their chapels. The Sunday school and mission room to the rear were designed by the firm of form Welman and Street. The complex of buildings is Gothic Revival in style, built of yellowish Bargate stone dressed with ashlar and with slate-tiled roofs. The lancet windows have Decorated Gothic-style tracery. The tall four-light window on the steeply gabled Bridge Street façade is flanked by two projecting gabled stone porches with doorways set beneath pointed-arched hood moulds. Full-height buttresses rise alongside this window. There are two small oculi in the form of quatrefoils above the porch gables, and another larger (stretched) quatrefoil oculus with a hood mould between the peak of the window and the upper gable of the chapel. Offset to the right is a Gothic-style tower of two stages, the upper stage slightly narrower and with buttresses rising nearly to its turreted top; there are small lancets in the lower stage and a much taller, narrow lancet above. The spire sat on top of this turret until it was removed.

To the rear is the mission room and schoolroom complex of 1883–84. These are linked by a flat-roofed block of three bays, each separated by a buttress, and with flat-arched windows with transoms to each bay. In the leftmost bay is a pointed-arched recessed entrance. The parapet has a dentil cornice. The main part of the mission room adjoining this is of two storeys and two bays entered through a portico with three pointed-arched openings. A further bay, with its gable end facing parallel to the street (The Burys), has stepped lancet windows in its side elevation and paired lancets on both storeys. Attached to the rear of this is a two-storey polygonal section with buttresses marking each angle and triple lancets to each storey.

== See also ==
- List of places of worship in Waverley (borough)

== Bibliography ==
- Brooks, Chris; Saint, Andrew (1995). The Victorian Church: Architecture and Society. Manchester: Manchester University Press. ISBN 9780719040207.
- Cleal, Edward E.; Crippen, T. G. (1908). The story of Congregationalism in Surrey. London: James Clarke & Co.
- Head, Ronald (1990). Godalming in Old Picture Postcards. Vol. 2. Zaltbommel: European Library. ISBN 90-288-4965-3.
- Head, Ronald (2005). Godalming. Francis Frith's Town & City Memories. Teffont: The Francis Frith Collection. ISBN 1-85937-976-1.
- Nairn, Ian; Pevsner, Nikolaus (1971) [1962]. The Buildings of England: Surrey (2nd ed.). Harmondsworth: Penguin Books. ISBN 0-300-09675-5.
- Stell, Christopher (2002). Nonconformist Chapels and Meeting-houses in Eastern England. Swindon: English Heritage. ISBN 1-873592-50-7.
- Stock, Peter (1999). Hidden Nonconformity: a study of Nonconformity in the Godalming area from the 17th century. Farnham: Arrow Press.
