= St Tarcisius Church, Camberley =

Coordinates: 51°20′18″N 0°45′02″W

St Tarcisius Church
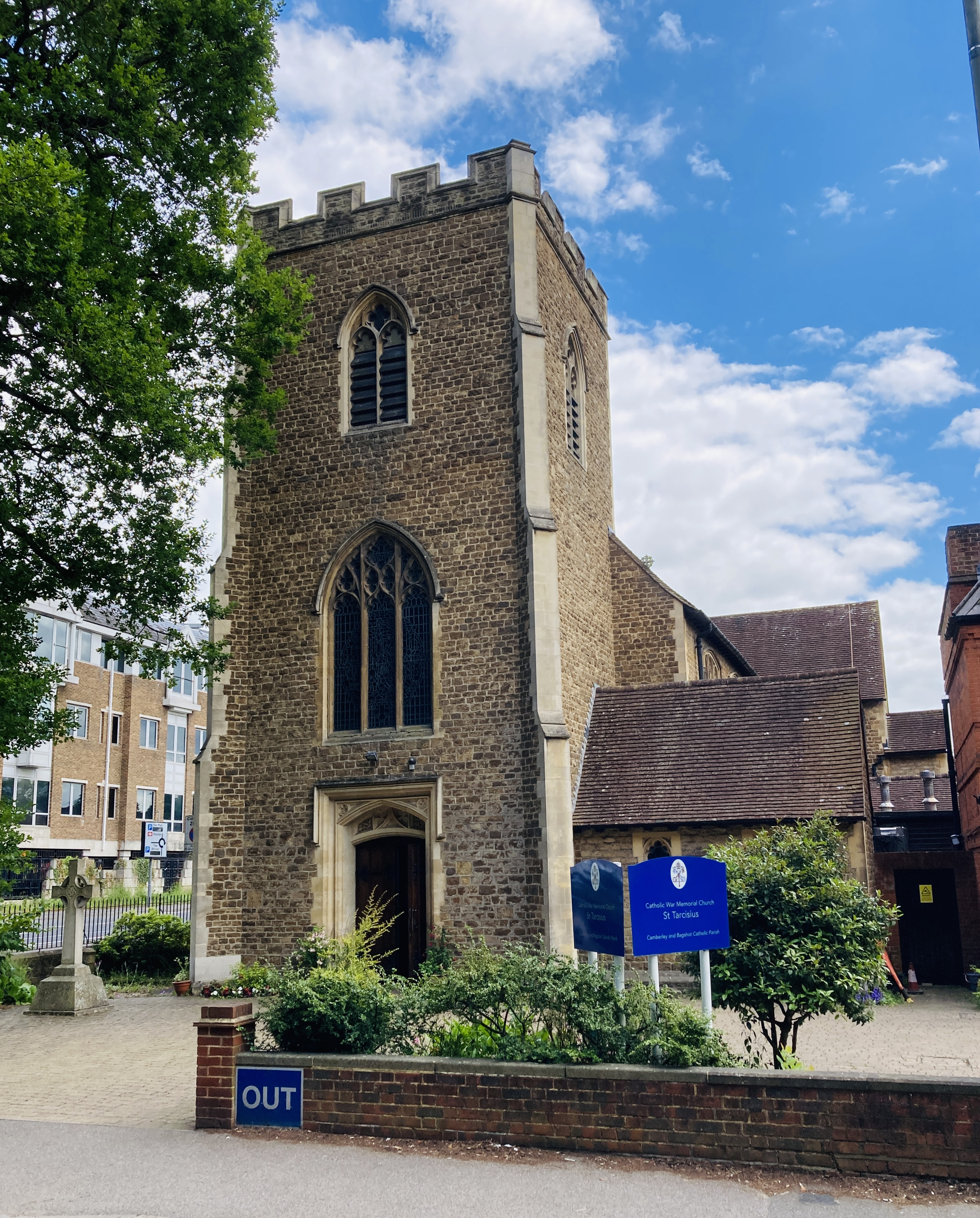
- St Tarcisius Church from the front

- Location in Surrey
- Location: Camberley
- Country: England
- Denomination: Roman Catholic
- Website: CBParish.co.uk

History
- Status: Parish church
- Dedication: Saint Tarcisius
- Consecrated: 26 June 1926

Architecture
- Functional status: Active
- Heritage designation: Grade II listed
- Designated: 3 March 2005
- Architect: Frederick Walters
- Style: Gothic Revival
- Groundbreaking: 12 September 1923
- Completed: 18 November 1924
- Construction cost: £13,500

Administration
- Province: Southwark
- Diocese: Arundel and Brighton
- Deanery: Woking
- Parish: Camberley & Bagshot

Clergy
- Priest: Father Paul Turner

St Tarcisius Church is a Roman Catholic Parish church in Camberley, Surrey. It was built between 1923 and 1924 and was designed by Frederick Walters. It is situated on the London Road, to the north of the town, next to The Atrium Shopping Centre. It is a Grade II listed building.

== History ==
=== Foundation ===
In 1869, a priest, Fr Thomas Purcell would come from Aldershot, to say Mass for the local Catholic population in various people's houses. For the next four years, Catholics would travel to St Joseph's Church, Aldershot for Mass. On 25 January 1873, a site was bought for £120 for a school. In 1874, a priest, Fr McKenna, was permanently appointed to serve the Catholics in Camberley. In 1879, Lady Southwell gave a plot of land, the present site, for the construction of St Tarcisius Church. In 1884, a temporary iron church was built to accommodate the congregation. In 1888, the priest's house was built and in 1896 the school was expanded.

=== Construction ===
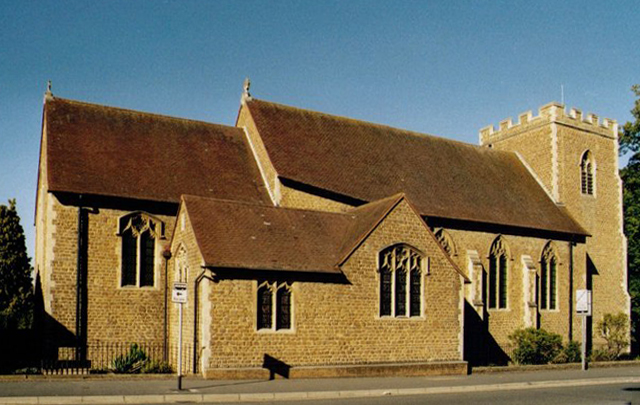
View of the east side of the church

In 1906, Fr Patrick Twomey came to Camberley and started to plan to build a new permanent church. On 12 September 1923, the foundation stone of the church was laid by the Bishop of Southwark, Peter Amigo.

On 18 November 1924, the church was opened. The church was designed by Frederick Walters as a War Memorial for fallen British Catholic military officers in the First World War. It served as the chaplaincy for Catholics at the Royal Military Academy Sandhurst. On 26 June 1926, the church was consecrated by Cardinal Francis Bourne. In 1935, stained-glass windows, designed by Paul Woodroffe, were installed in the church.

== Architecture ==
=== Exterior ===
There is a tower on the north west side of the church and the church is made of Bargate stone. The top of the tower is crenellated and there is a porch under the tower. There is a traceried window above the entrance. The transepts are gabled and also have traceried windows. Above the chancel is a five-bay traceried window.

=== Interior ===
There are memorial plaques made of marble in the porch. The nave has a pine ceiling. The arcade in the nave and the arches inside the transepts are made of Bath stone. The original pews, made of oak, that were installed when the church was built, are still present.

== Gallery ==
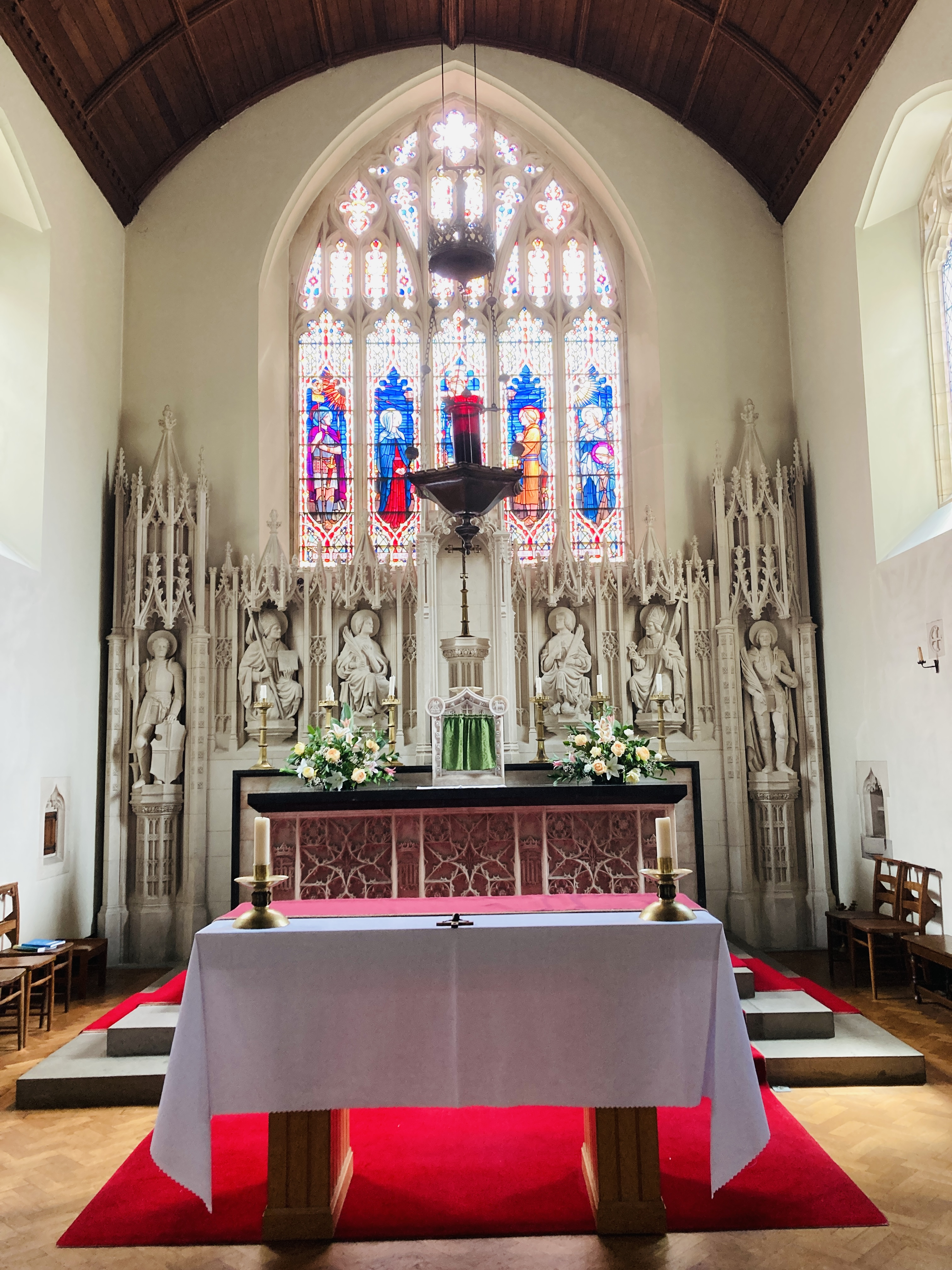
The high altar

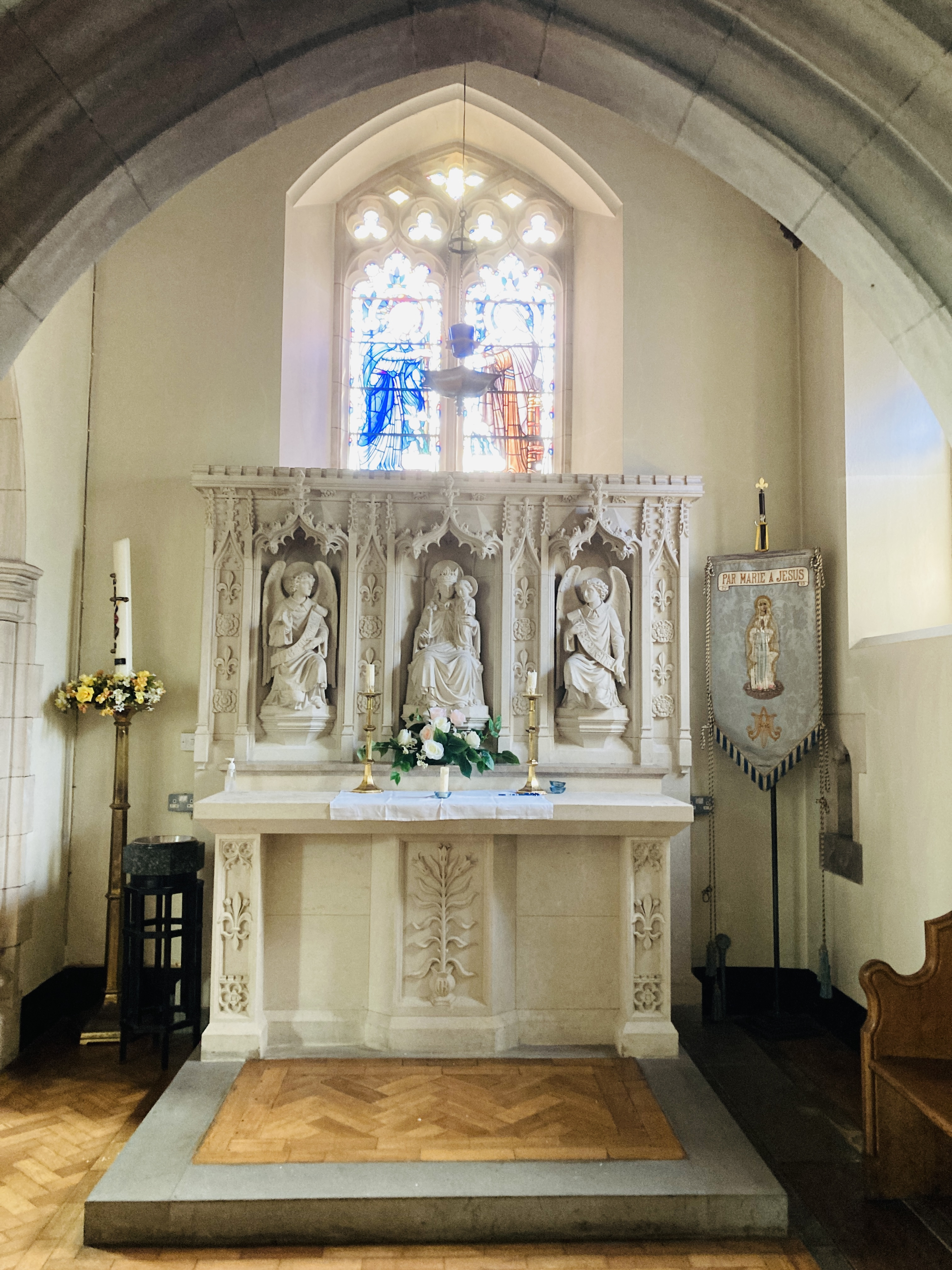
The altar in a side chapel

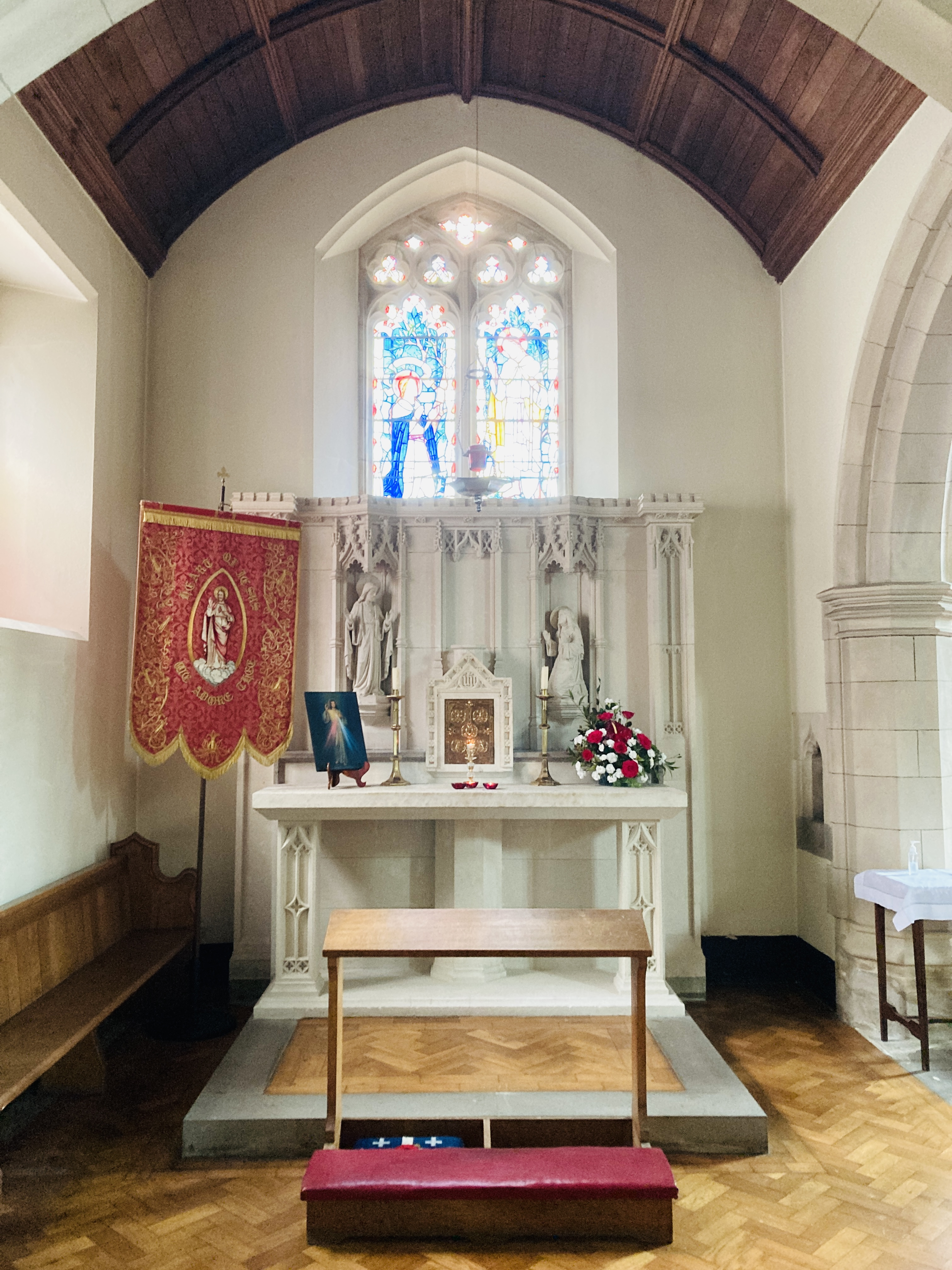
Side chapel

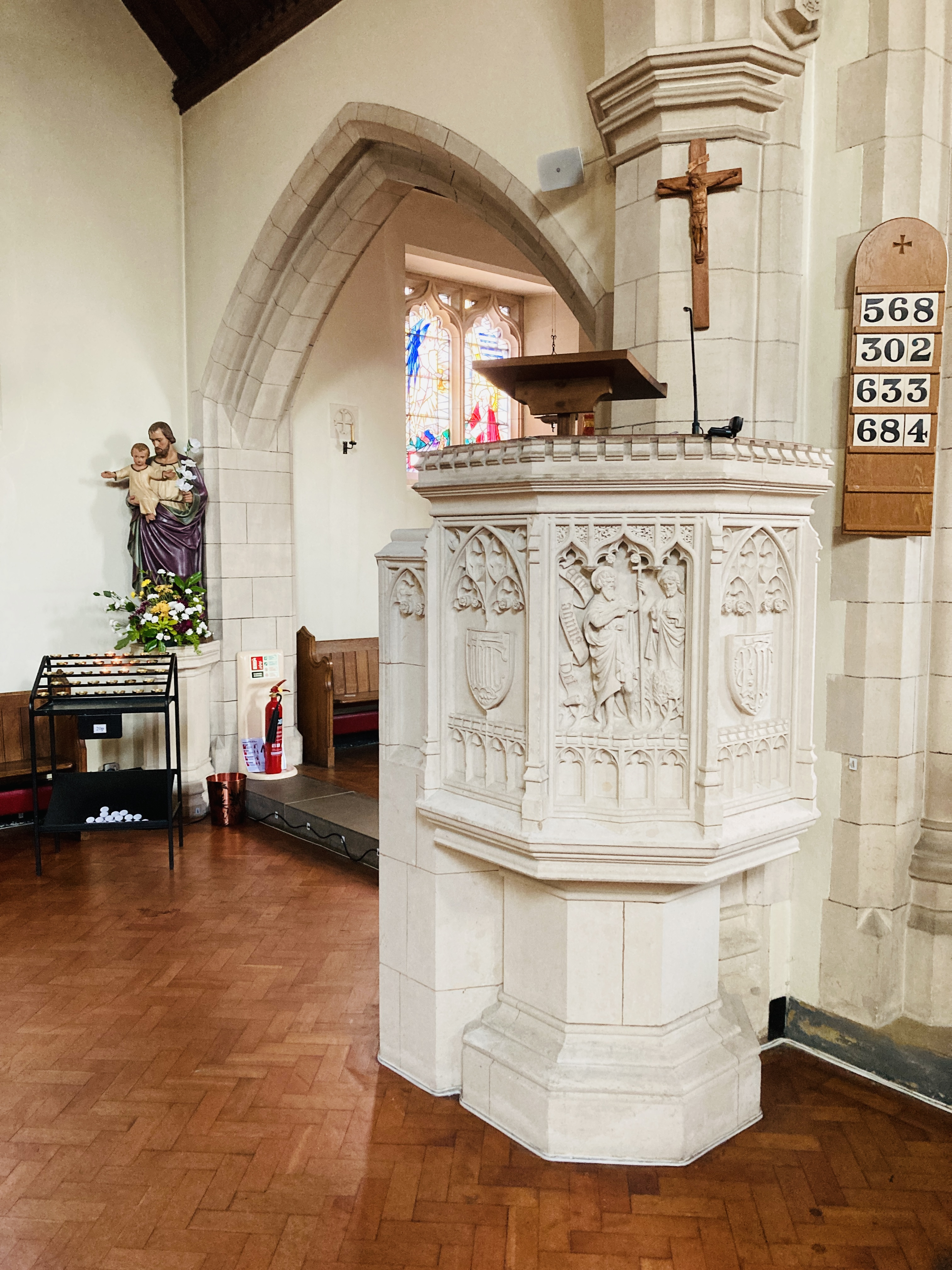
The pulpit

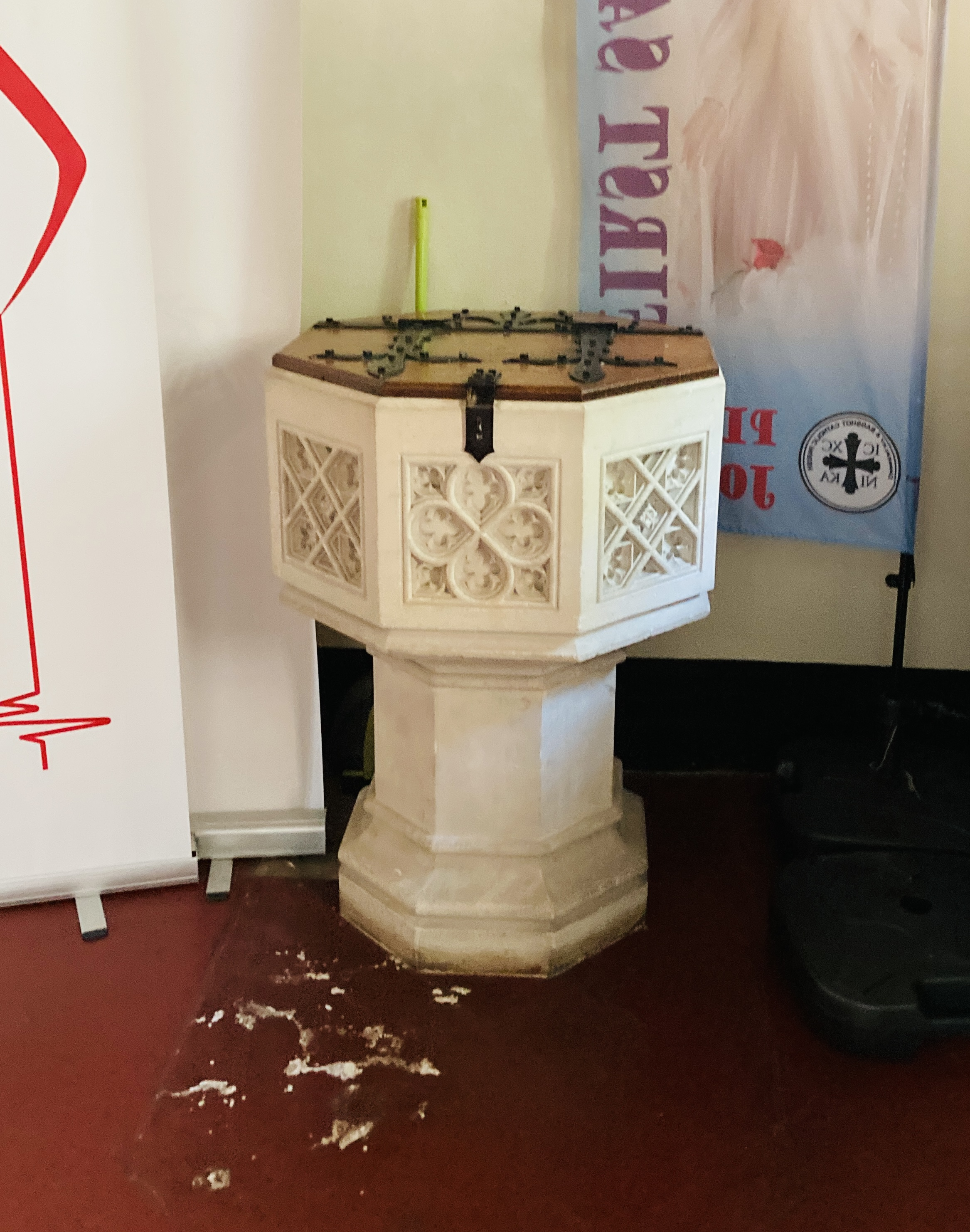
The baptismal font

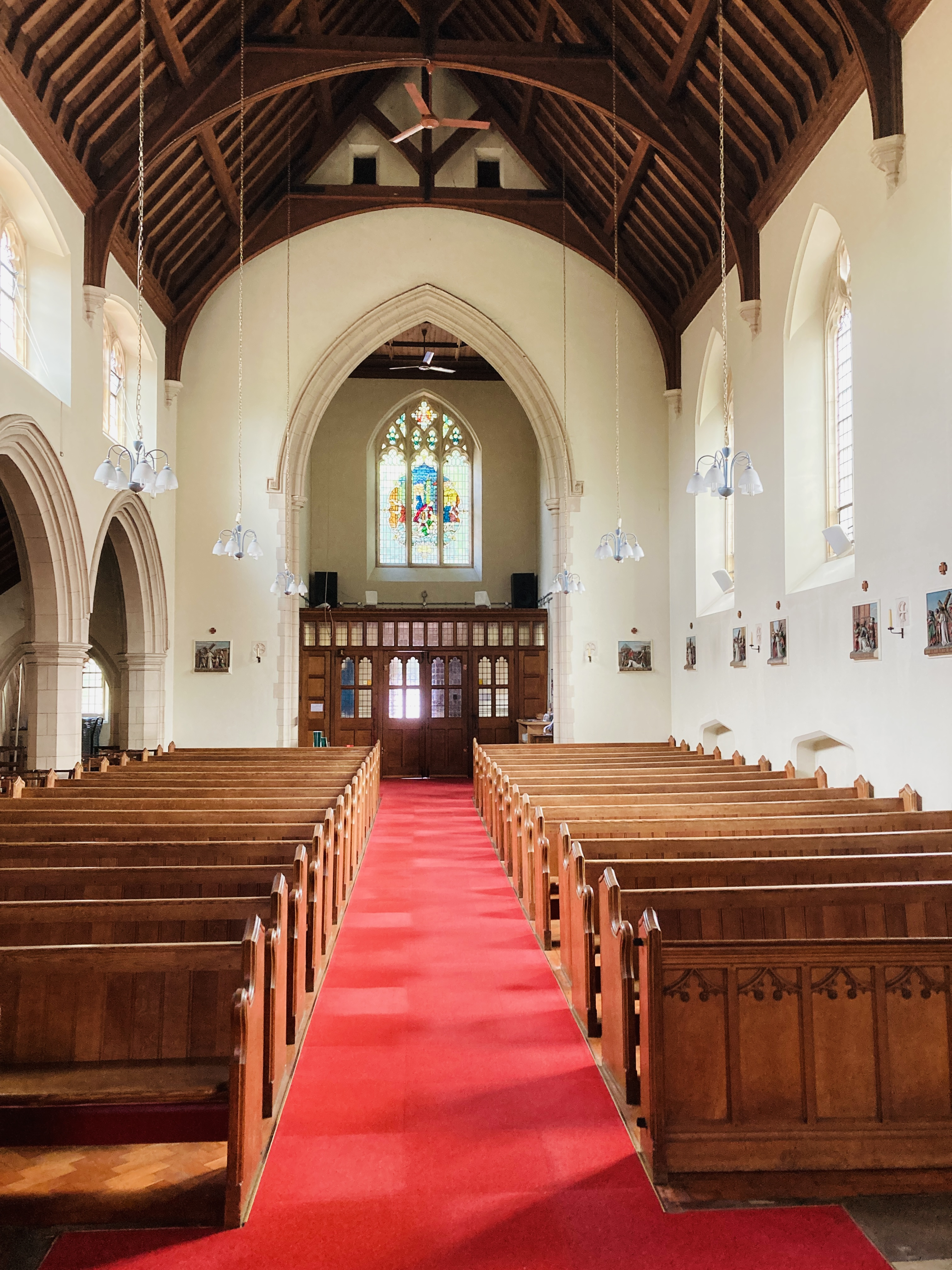
View down the nave to the entrance

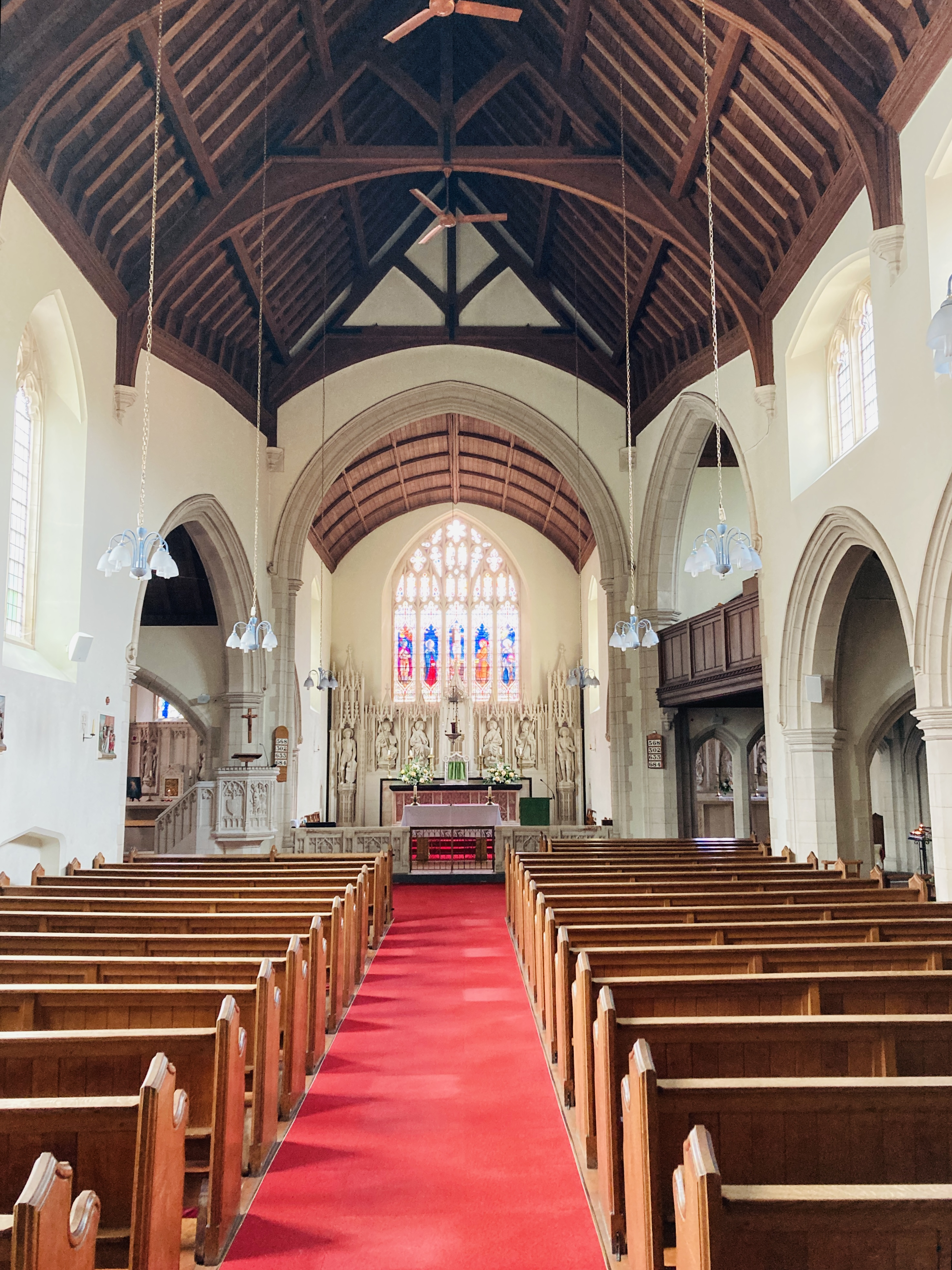
View up the nave to the altar

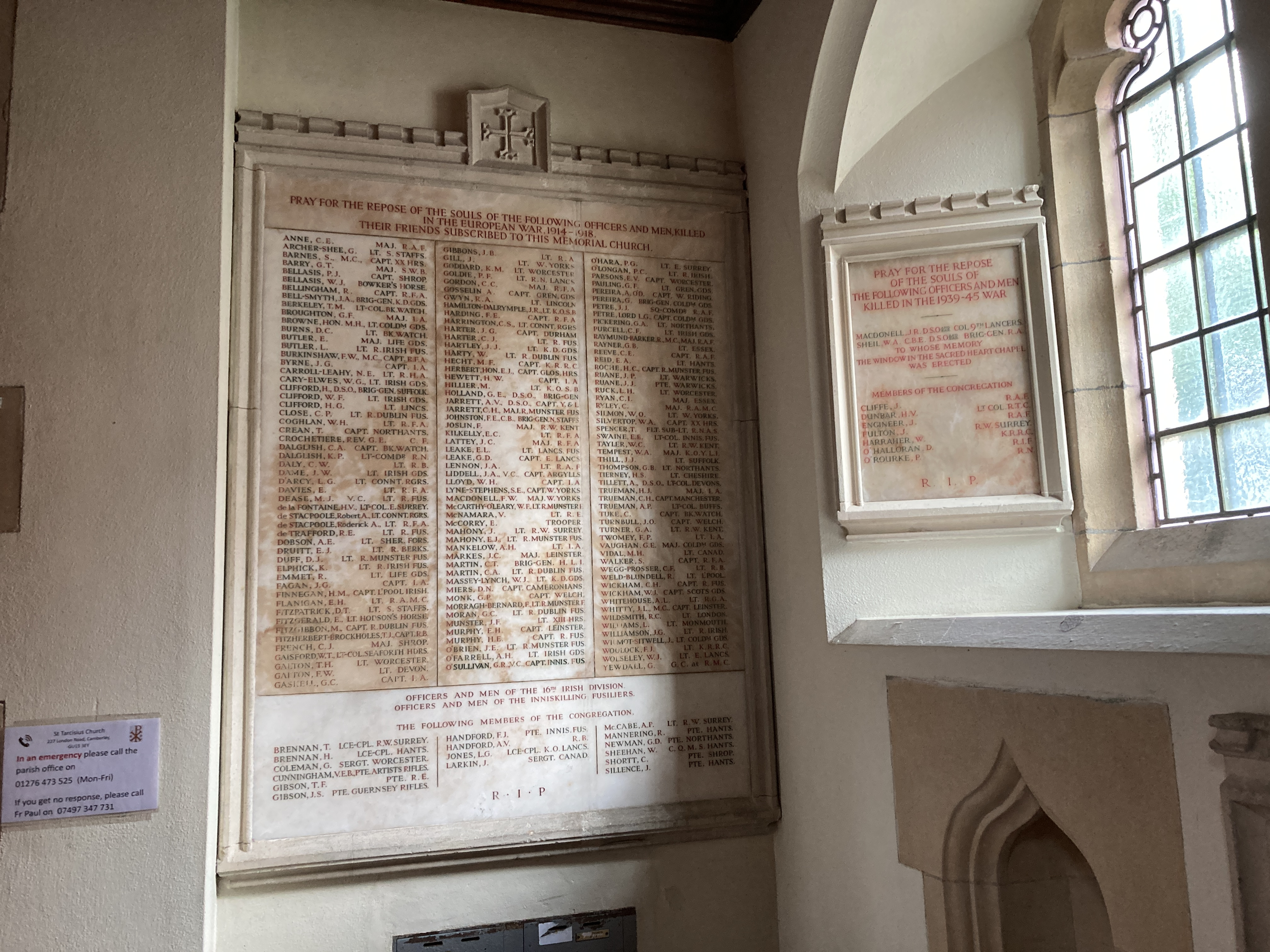
Memorial plaques in the porch

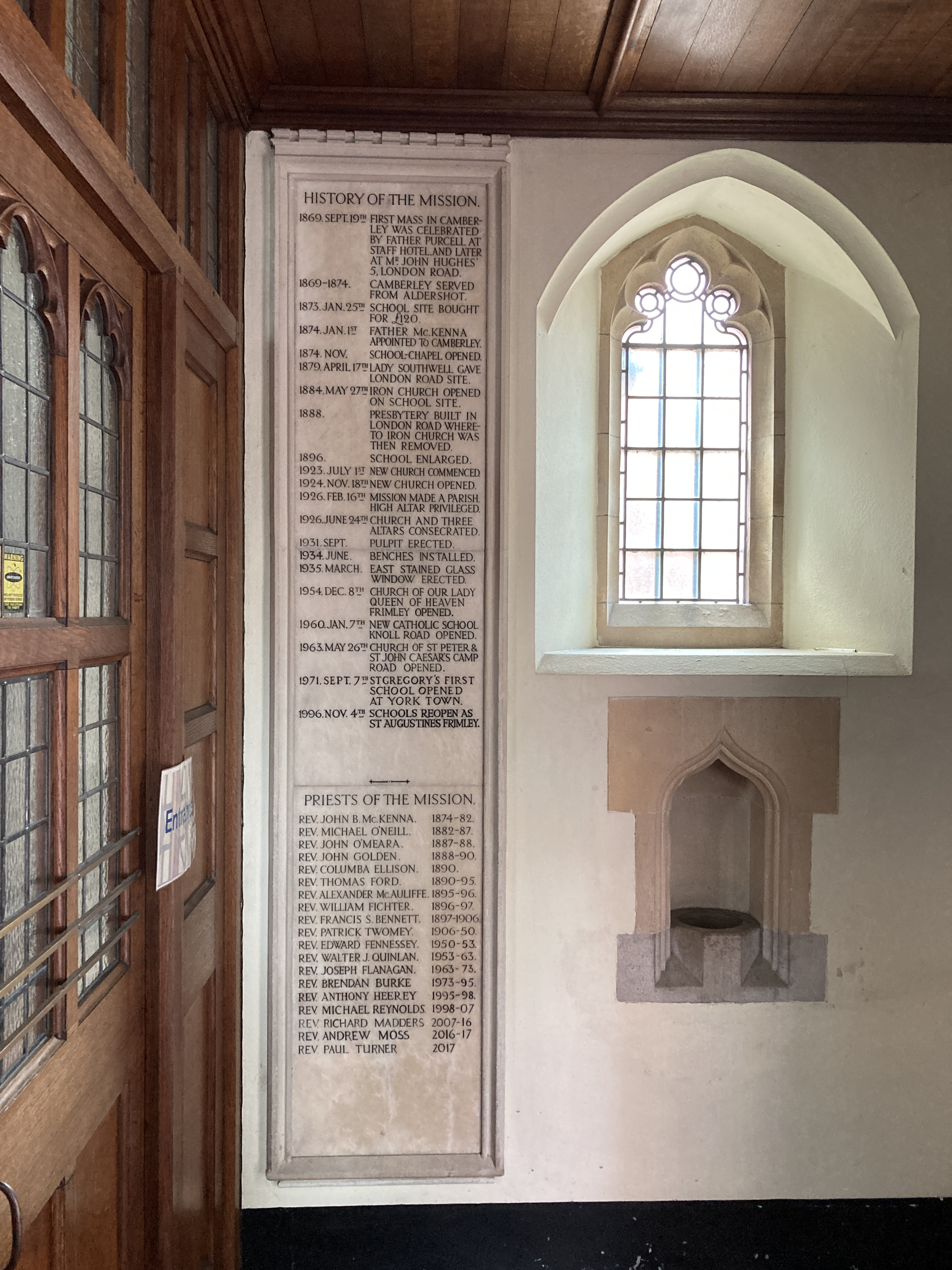
Plaque in the porch

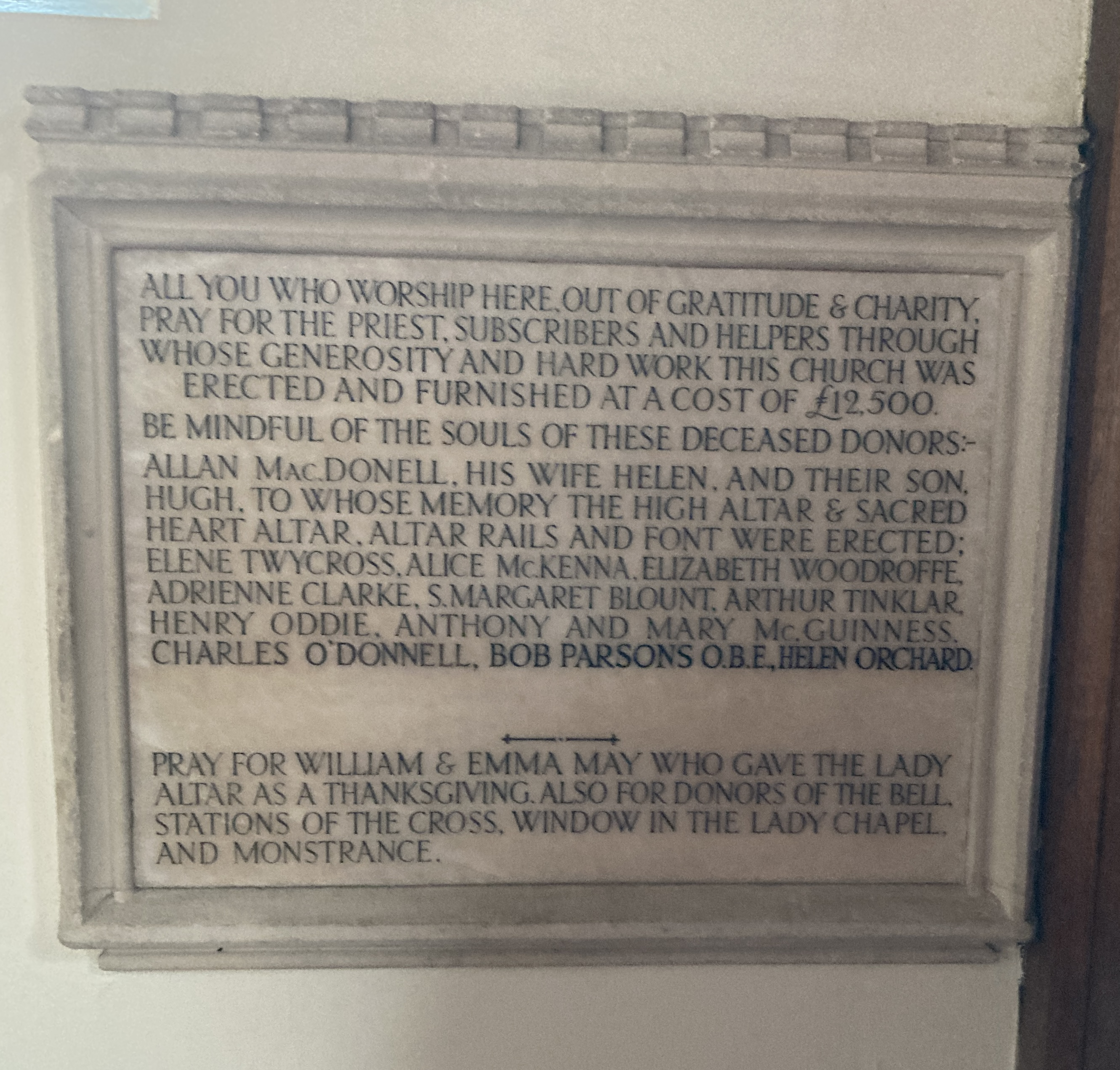
Plaque in the porch

== Parish ==
Since 2007, the church has been part of the parish of Camberley & Bagshot along with Christ the King Church in Bagshot and St Peter & St John Church in Old Dean, so the Mass times of the churches do not conflict. St Tarcisius Church has Sunday Mass at 9:15 am, Christ the King Church has its Sunday Mass at 11:15 am and the Sunday Mass for St Peter & St John Church is on Saturday afternoon at 5:30 pm.

== See also ==
- Roman Catholic Diocese of Arundel and Brighton
