= Church of St Peter & St Paul, Godalming =

Church in Surrey, England

Church of St. Peter and St. Paul
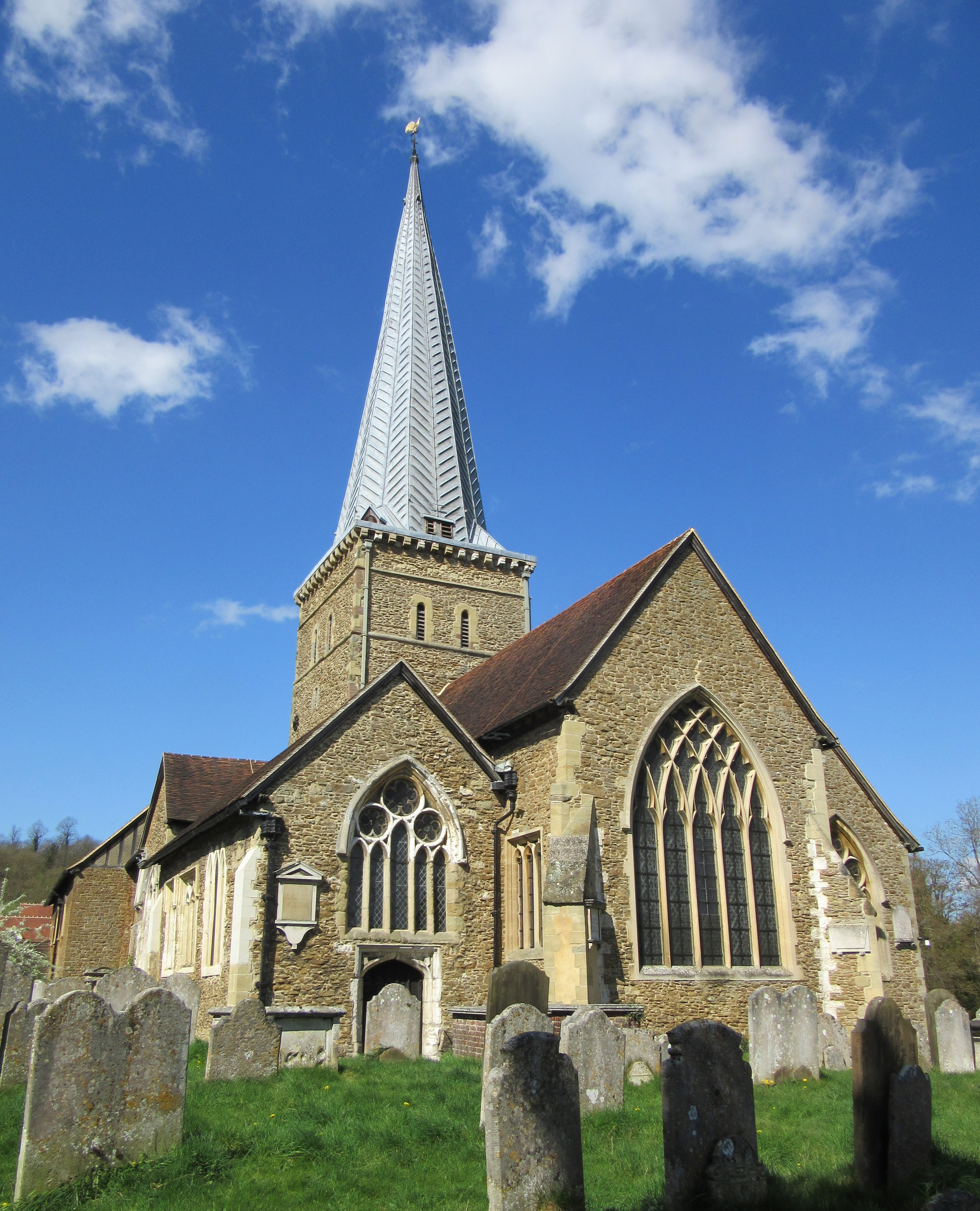
- The church viewed from the churchyard

- Location in Surrey
- 51°11′13″N 0°36′57″W
- Denomination: Church of England
- Churchmanship: Broad Church
- Website: https://godalmingminster.org/

History
- Dedication: Saint Peter and Saint Paul

Administration
- Province: Canterbury
- Diocese: Guildford
- Archdeaconry: Surrey
- Deanery: Godalming
- Parish: Godalming Minster

Clergy
- Priest(s): Rev'd Chris Lion, Rector

The Church of St. Peter and St. Paul is part of Godalming Minster (est. 2024) and is also known as Godalming Minster Church Street. It is a parish church of the Church of England in Godalming, Surrey.

The present building, the oldest in the town, was built in the twelfth century, replacing an earlier Anglo-Saxon church. Two medieval chapels are integrated into the present building. Its core is made from the local sandstone, Bargate stone from the nearby Greensand Ridge, which is found close to the town. Also found around the church is the old Lammas, or 'common', land.

The church is set on the town centre thoroughfare, Church Street, in the urban part of the market town that doubles as a commuter and retirement town and is a Grade I-listed building.

== Social history ==
=== Origins ===
A church has stood on this site since at least the mid-ninth century. It features several carved stones, which are dated between 820 and 840. A few Anglo Saxon remnants survive in the present structure, which was largely rebuilt in the twelfth century. In 1086, the Domesday Book recorded that Ranulf Flambard, justiciar of William Rufus, held Godalming church.

The lammas, or common land, complemented a substantial glebe, the funds from which allowed for a grand and spacious structure to be built.

=== The church in the European wars of religion and English Civil War ===
Godalming, at the end of King Charles the First's reign, was a Calvinistic stronghold. The vicar at that time, known as Dr. Andrews, was ejected from his living in 1640, and the town welcomed the Calvinistic preacher, Thomas Edwards. As he travelled the 30 miles from London, via the Portsmouth Road, three or four times a week, he would preach to people at certain points along the road.

Some of the land around the church and the town belonged to Salisbury Cathedral, and due to the diversity of important clergymen who owned the land, in the seventeenth century 'Godalming' became a byword for piety. A proverb of the time says:

He that shall say well, do well, and think well in mind,
Shall as soon come to heaven, as they that dwell at Godalming.

=== Rectory ===
The rectory, which was considered a manor, was not owned by the church. Therefore, its lay owner appointed a vicar in 1066 named Ulmaer, who held it under Edward the Confessor. Save for 11 years of seizure under the governments of Cromwell it was held by the Dean and Chapter of Salisbury Cathedral between 1128 and 1846. In that year the Ecclesiastical Commissioners took charge of it and it was sold in 1860 to John Simmonds, who devised it to Mr J. Whateley Simmonds.

== Architectural history ==
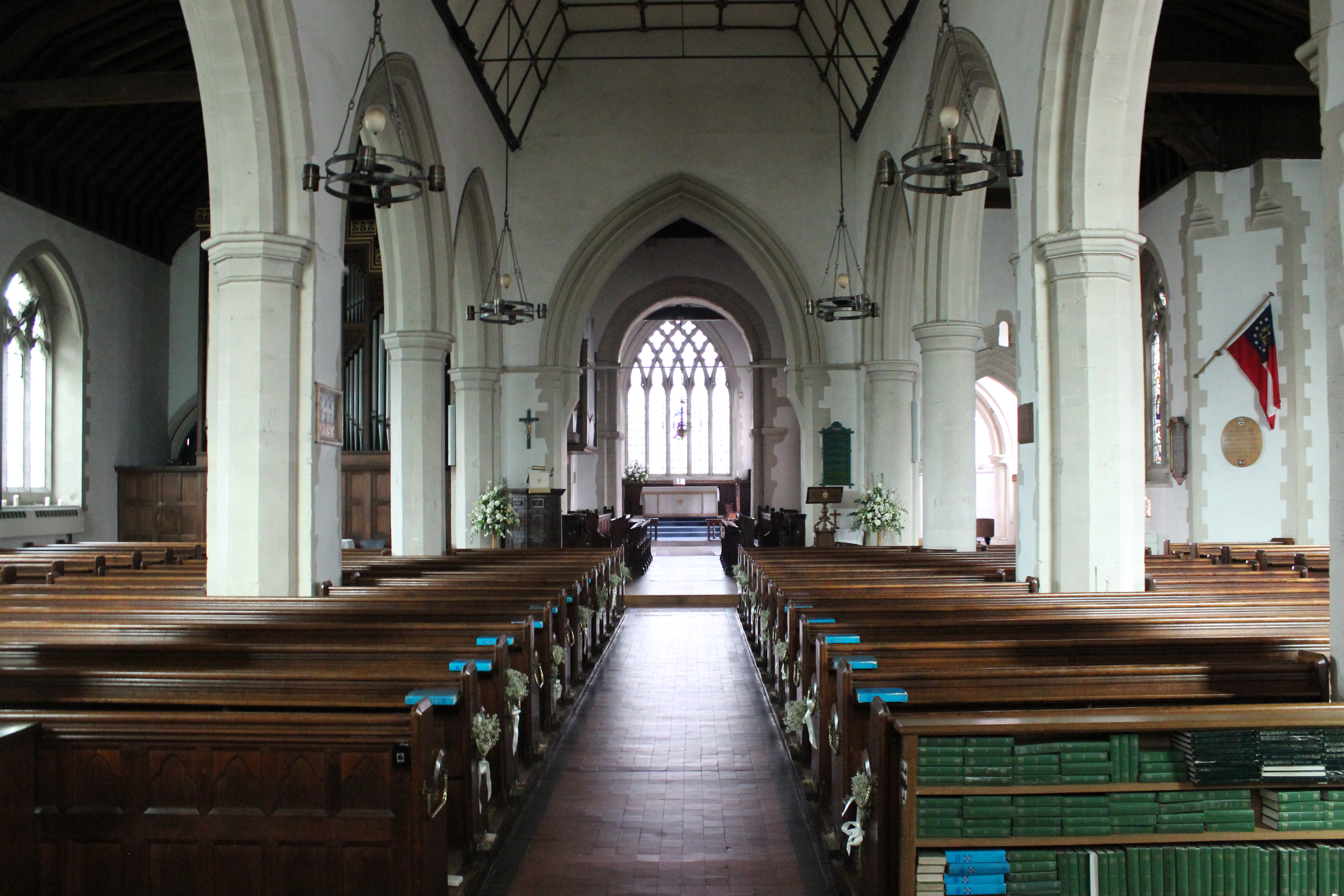
Church interior

First built during the Anglo-Saxon and early Norman periods, the structure has been proven in ecclesiastical records to have been a redevelopment of an Anglo-Saxon church:

The nucleus around which it has grown lies in the centre, the eastern half of the nave representing the simple aisleless nave of the pre-Conquest church, and the central tower its short, square chancel. This would give a nave of about 32 ft. by 20 ft.; the chancel...being 16 ft. 6 in. wide and in length originally about a foot longer. This Saxon church had walls averaging 3 ft. in thickness, and disproportionately lofty—about 25 ft.—as was commonly the case in work of this period...
About the year 1100 the primitive church received its first enlargement, in the form of a long chancel (about 33 ft. 3 in. by 17 ft. 3 in.), a low tower being raised upon the gabled walls of the original chancel, and the eastern wall thickened by about a foot on the western side, an arch of two plain orders, with chamfered imposts, being pierced through it. This arch still exists, but in 1879 it was lifted up on higher piers...

In the thirteenth century, the cruciform church of the Norman England was converted into a rectangle by the construction of the north and south chapels and the widening of the nave aisles. In the same century, the magnificent oak-timbered spire was constructed, which was clad in lead (and still is to this day).

Further building work followed in subsequent centuries, particularly in the fourteenth century. In the nineteenth century, the nave was lengthened and the aisles were extended westwards and widened, and the twentieth century saw the construction of a porch in 1911 and vestries in 1925.

The structure gained listed status in 1947 and is classed as Grade I.

== Services ==
See godalmingminster.org/Sundays

== Chapels and paintings ==
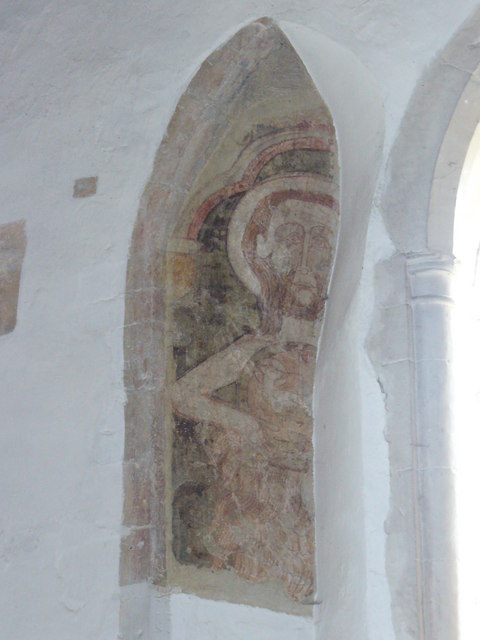
Medieval wall painting of St John the Baptist

In the two chapel sections are decorative mural paintings and a medieval painting of St John the Baptist.

== Monuments ==
The church has interior monuments to Judeth Elyott, d.1615: a figure of a lady kneeling before a book on a lectern in an elaborately decorated aedicule, the cornice surmounted by coat of arms, shields, and end pedestals with skull and hour-glass, and tablet with skull and cross-bones underneath; Thomas and Joan Purvoche, d.1509, John Barker, d.1595 and John and Elizabeth Westbrook.

Wall paintings on its window frames have been re-exposed in the twenty-first century.

== Heraldic Roof Bosses ==
There are currently 68 roof bosses in the nave. The bosses are not in their original settings. One notable boss is that of the arms of Thomas Howard, Earl of Surrey who defeated the Scots at Flodden on the 9th September 1513.

== Bells ==
The Church has a fine set of bells hung for the traditional English-style of bell-ringing. The tenor weighs just over a tonne and weighs in at 1221 kg.

In 2017, all of the bells were recast, with the tenor weighing two hundredweight more than previously (now weighing 24 hundredweight, 0 quarters and 4 pounds, or 1221 kg). The restoration and recasting were carried out by John Taylor & Co, now Britain's largest church-bell firm.

The bells are rung regularly for the 10 am service in Church, and ringing practice is held on Tuesday evenings.

== See also ==
- List of places of worship in Waverley (borough)
