= Bargate stone =

Highly durable form of sandstone used for building

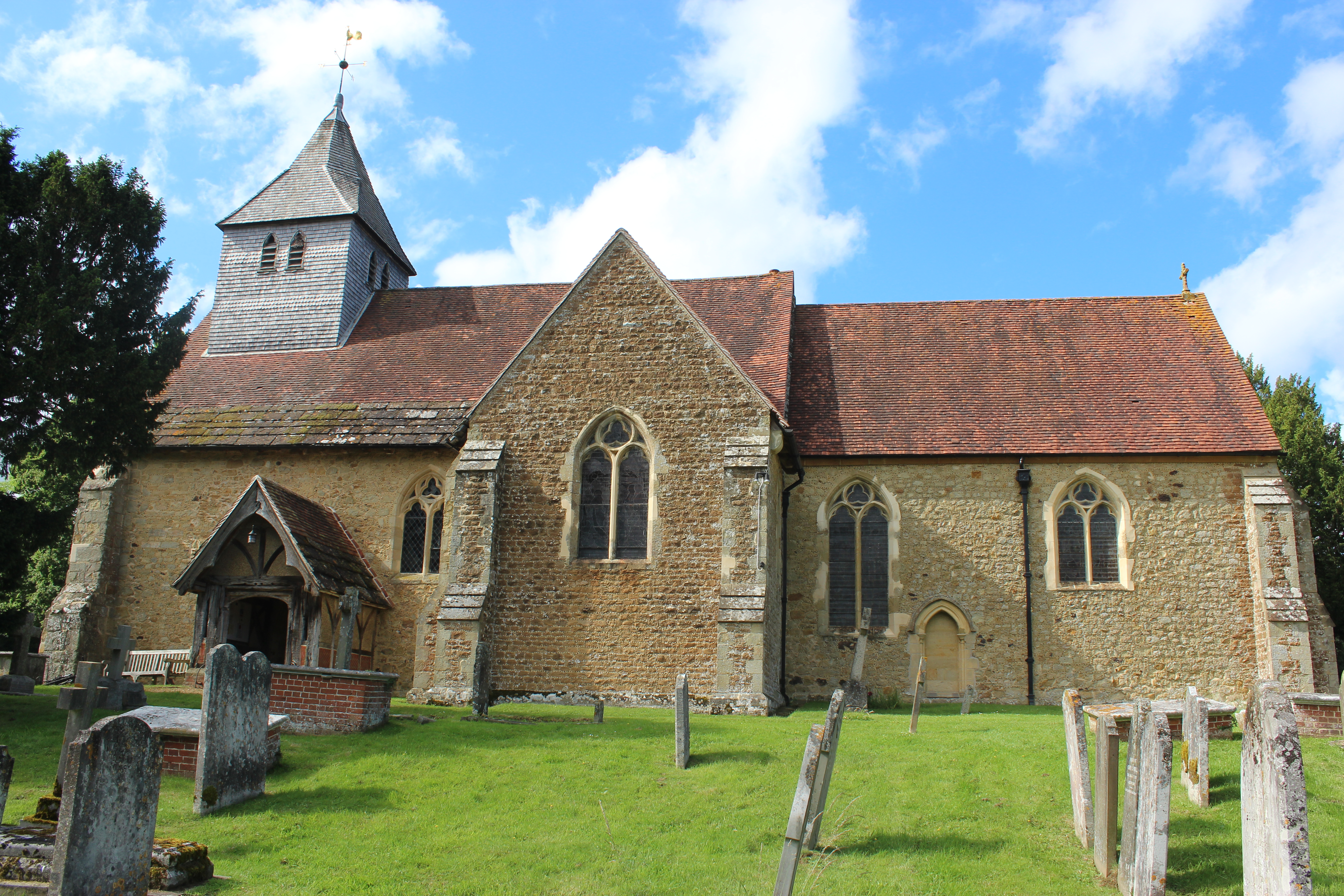
Church of St Mary and All Saints, Dunsfold

Bargate stone is a highly durable form of sandstone. It owes its yellow, butter or honey colouring to a high iron content. In some contexts it may be considered to be a form of ironstone. However, in the context of stone buildings local to the extraction of Bargate Stone, the term 'ironstone' is often used to refer to a darker stone, also extracted from the Greensand, which rusts to a brown colour.

== Sources ==
This stone was quarried for centuries in the Bargate Member of the Greensand Ridge, particularly where it is widest in south west Surrey, England. It occurs near the surface and was quarried in the hillsides near Godalming. Medieval quarries are still visible in Godalming, at the foot of Holloway Hill.

Bargate stone is rare in current use due to its short supply. Bath stone, Yorkstone and other similar coloured stone is sometimes used as alternatives, or to complement it.

== Petrography ==
Bargate stone is typically a mix of sandy bioclastic limestone and bioclastic sandstone. The intergranular cements comprise ferroan carbonate.

== Use ==
Bargate Stone is found in many buildings in Surrey, approximately 250 of which are listed, and in two churches in London. It is endemic to older buildings near the Greensand Ridge where it is found. Its 20th-century use tended towards coursed use of Bargate sandstone with bricks, or concrete, sometimes with ashlar dressings or mortar rendering.

=== Examples ===
==== Early medieval ====
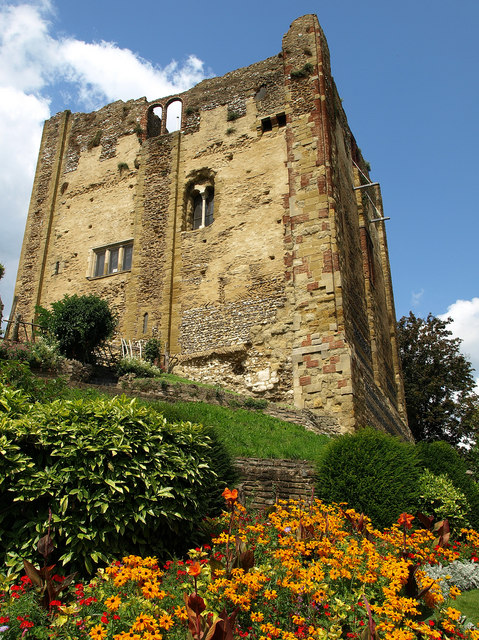
Guildford Castle keep

- The Keep at Guildford Castle. It was a credit to the strength of Bargate that it was chosen for the main structure, standing on top of the natural chalk and Bargate stone bedrock, made it available by quarrying in the locality.
- Godalming Parish Church, Grade I listed assisted by Saxon features.
- Church of St. Mary and All Saints, Dunsfold
- St Nicholas's Church Compton, Guildford (Bargate rubble used, mortar-rendered)
- Church of St. Mary the Virgin (12th-century tower only), Oxted in Tandridge District, east Surrey
- St Mary's Church, (relevantly mostly in clunch from its own Quarry Street) Guildford
- St James's Church, Abinger (Note: Tower parapet only)
- All Saints Church, Witley, Surrey

==== 16th Century ====
Tillingbourne Cottage, Wotton, Surrey

==== 17th Century ====
Cosford Mill, Thursley

==== 18th Century ====
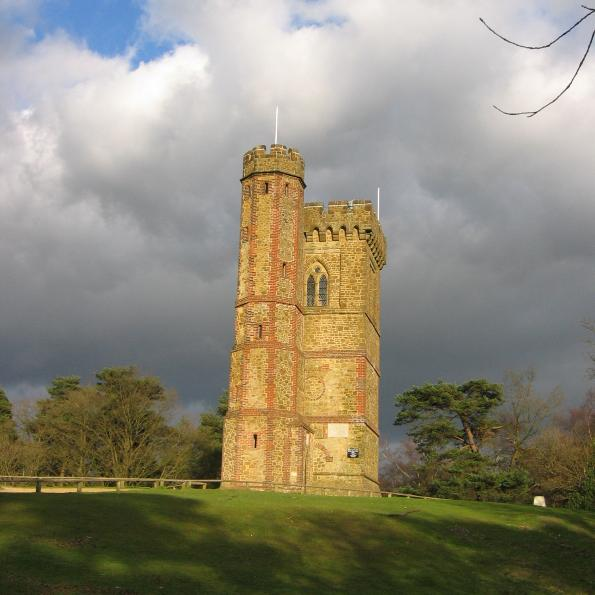
The tower on the top of Leith Hill

- Leith Hill Tower

==== 19th Century ====
- St Catherine's School/Drama Studio, Guildford
- St Stephen's Church, Gloucester Road, London (York stone parpoints and dressings in Bath stone) (Note: By Joseph Peacock)
- St Nicholas's Church, Guildford
- St Michael's Church, York Town, Camberley
- The Shah Jahan Mosque, completed in 1889 along with similar-coloured Bath stone, but a limestone not a sandstone
- Charterhouse School (completed 1872) (Note: By Sir Edwin Lutyens)
- St Stephen's Church, Rochester Row, Westminster (Note: by architect Benjamin Ferrey - Bargate here described not as sandstone but ragstone)
- Booker's Tower
- Munstead Wood (Note: By Lutyens)
- Chinthurst Hill (Note: By Lutyens)
- Grafham Grange School, Bramley (Note: By Henry Woodyer as architect's home, now school)
- St James' Court, Farnham (Note: By Henry Woodyer, formerly a church)
- St Johns Church, Caterham (Note: William Bassett Smith and Thomas Graham Jackson)

==== 20th Century ====
- The Pergola, Vann Park and Garden, Hambledon
- Pinewoods, Oxshott
- Tigbourne Court, Wormley (blocks with thin horizontal bands of tiles)
- Hascombe Court, Hascombe (Note: By J. D. Coleridge, for Robert EA Murray and later for Sir John Jarvis)
- Platform of war memorial, Bramshott, Hampshire (Note: Mostly made of Doulton stone)
- St Tarcisius Church, Camberley — the War Memorial Church to the British Catholic army officers who died in World War I. North Lady Chapel has triple arches and a stone reredos depicting the Virgin and Child and angels Bath stone dressings (Note: By Frederick Walters, dressings in Bath stone, many religious reredos including angels and the Virgin Mary)
- Orchards by Edwin Lutyens and Gertrude Jekyll, Bramley

== See also ==
- Reigate Stone quarried from the Upper Greensand Formation in east Surrey

== Notes and references ==
Notes
