= St Wilfrid's Church, Hailsham =

Church in East Sussex, England

St Wilfrid's Church
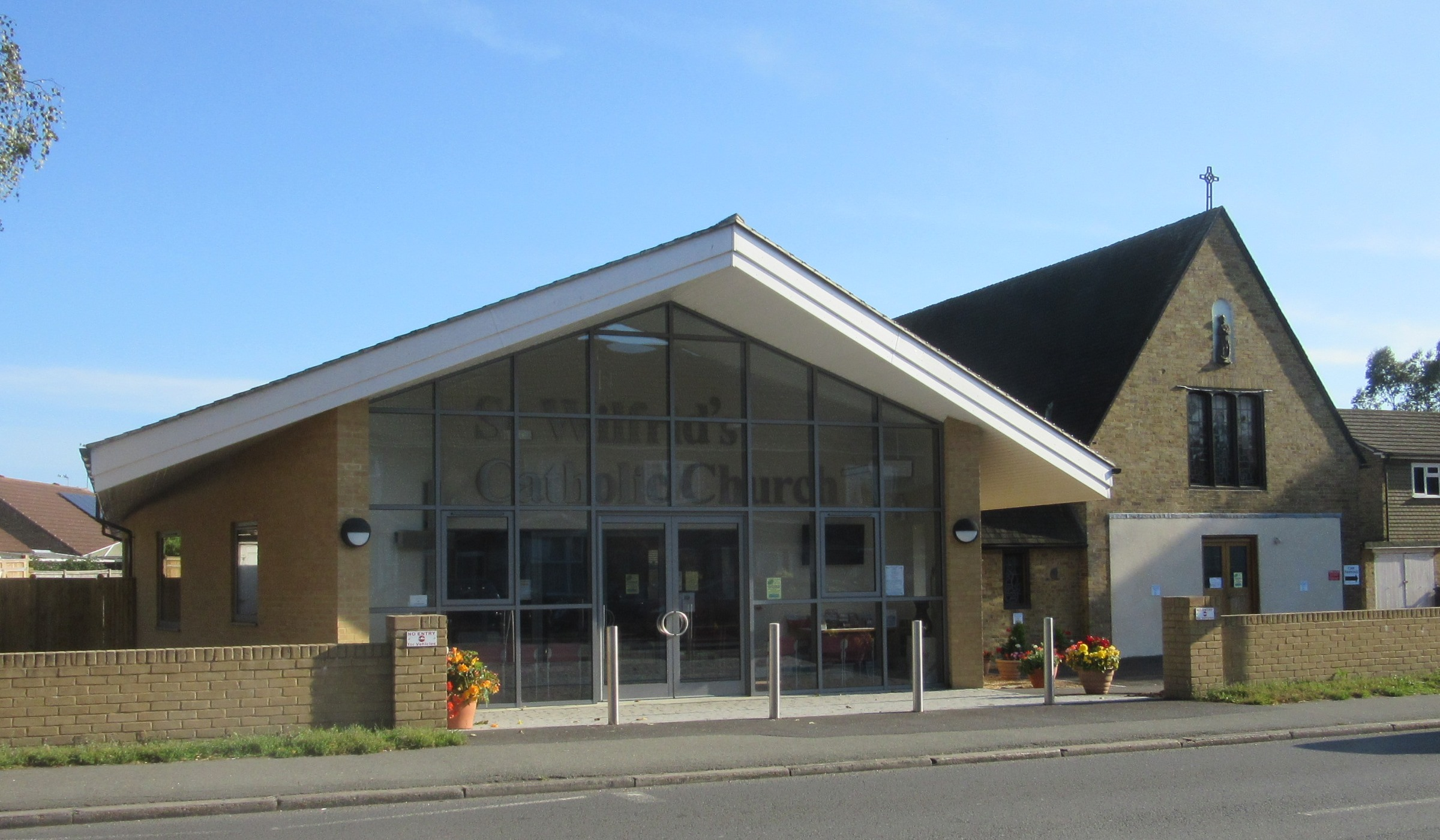
- The 2015 (left) and 1955 (right) church buildings from the northwest, seen in 2016
- St Wilfrid's Church
- 50.8605°N 0.2557°E
- OS grid reference: TQ 58846 09200
- Location: South Road, Hailsham, East Sussex BN27 3JG
- Country: England
- Denomination: Roman Catholic
- Website: saintsgeorgeandwilfrid.co.uk

History
- Status: Church
- Founded: 1922
- Founder: Mgr Arthur Cocks
- Dedication: Wilfrid
- Consecrated: 21 April 2016 (third church)

Architecture
- Functional status: Active
- Architect(s): First church: Fr Alexis Hauber; Second church: Henry Bingham Towner; Third church: Simon Franks of Innerdale Hudson Architects
- Style: First church: Vernacular; Second church: Vernacular; Third church: Modern
- Years built: First church: 1922; Second church: 1954–55; Third church: 2014–15

Administration
- Diocese: Arundel and Brighton
- Deanery: Eastbourne
- Parish: Hailsham and Polegate

Clergy
- Priest: Rev. Rory Kelly

St Wilfrid's Church is a Roman Catholic church serving the town of Hailsham in the Wealden district of East Sussex, England. The present building was completed in 2015 and is the third church to serve the town; it stands between its predecessors, a small hall opened in 1922 and a larger church of 1955, on a site which had belonged to a Catholic family since the 19th century. The Hailsham area was historically supportive of Protestant Nonconformist beliefs and had few Catholics, and for many years worshippers had to attend Mass in basic premises: rooms in private houses and, from 1917, a subdivided loft in the stables of a brewery. Numbers grew rapidly after the first permanent church opened, and after six decades of being served from Our Lady of Ransom Church, Eastbourne, Hailsham became an independent parish in 1957. The town's rapid postwar growth and an increasing Catholic population prompted the construction of the larger new church.

When created in 1957, Hailsham's parish covered an extensive, mostly rural area of East Sussex, and it was extended again in the early 21st century when nearby Polegate was included. The parish is now formally known as "Hailsham and Polegate" and is served by St Wilfrid's Church—at which there are two Sunday Masses each week—and St George's Church at Polegate. Both are part of the Eastbourne Deanery within the Roman Catholic Diocese of Arundel and Brighton. Masses were also celebrated up to once a week at a chapel at Hellingly Hospital, a large psychiatric hospital within the parish, for about 50 years until the late 1980s.

== History ==
The market town of Hailsham, 8 miles (13 km) north of Eastbourne, existed at the time of the Domesday survey of 1086 and has been a centre of agriculture and industry for centuries. Growth encouraged by the opening of a railway line brought more people to the town, and by the start of the 20th century Anglicans, Strict Baptists, Methodists and the Free Church had their own places of worship. No provision was made for Roman Catholic worship, though: the town was covered by the vast parish of Our Lady of Ransom Church in Eastbourne (the largest in the Archdiocese of Southwark at the time). In 1895 its priest appealed to the Vicar-General of the Archdiocese with a request to celebrate Mass in various towns and villages in the parish; he compiled a list showing distances from Eastbourne and the number of known Catholics in each place. Hailsham was said to have three, which was a "notably small" proportion given that it was by far the largest of the listed settlements.

About 3 miles (4.8 km) from Hailsham was the village of Upper Dicker, a stronghold of Protestant Nonconformism (the 400-capacity Zoar Strict Baptist Chapel had opened in 1838). One resident was a Catholic convert, though, and she wrote to Bishop of Southwark Peter Amigo in 1915 asking for part of her house (Elm Cottage) to be used as a public oratory for herself and local Catholics. Permission was granted, and Fr Paul Lynch of Our Lady of Ransom Church said Mass for her and three other people on 15 July 1915. This became a regular arrangement, and within months nurses from Hellingly Hospital were also attending. The small chapel was furnished with spare benches from St Peter and St Paul's Anglican church at Hellingly.

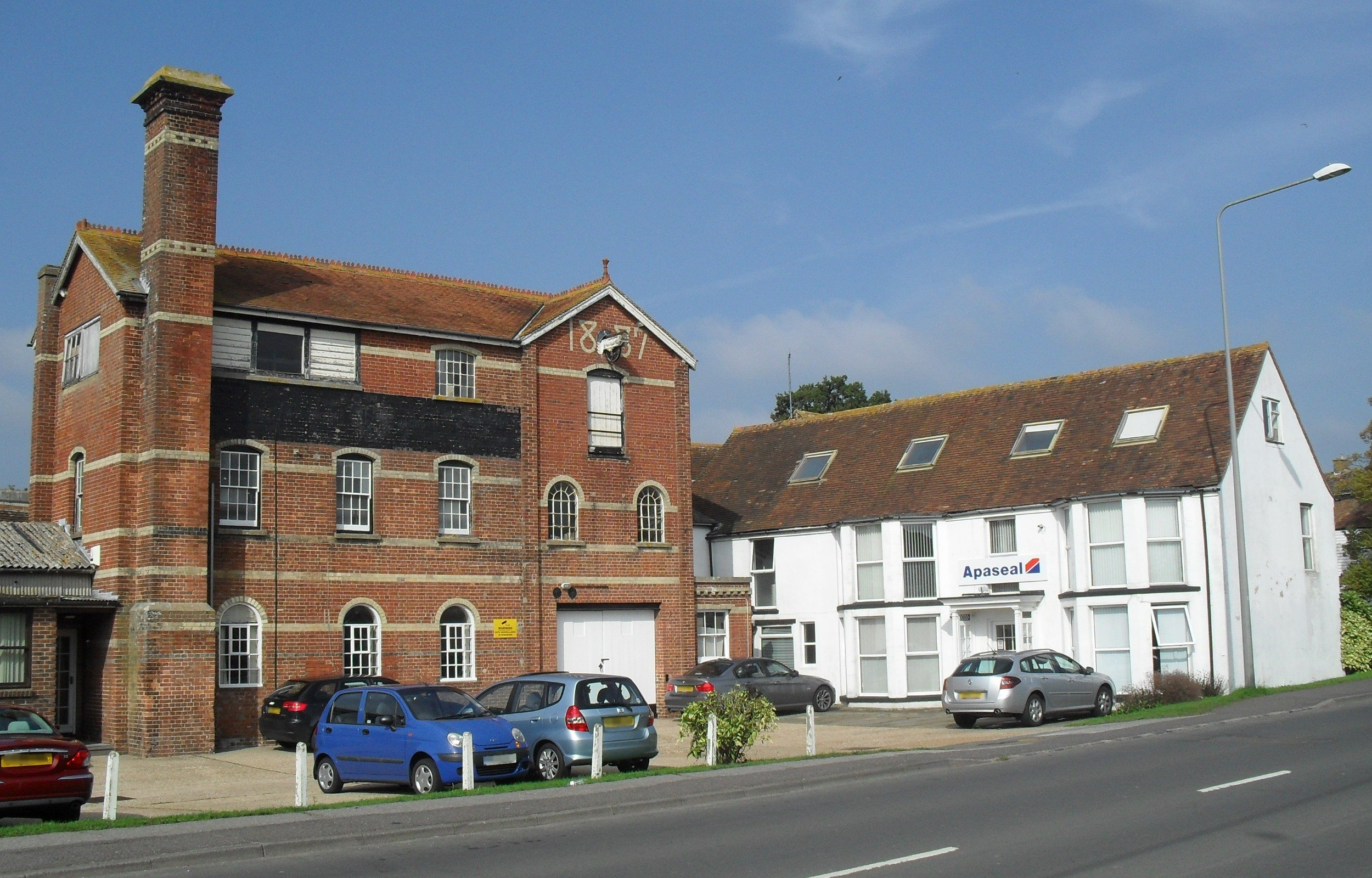
Mass was celebrated in an upper room at Lynn's Brewery in Battle Road (pictured in 2010 when owned by Apaseal).

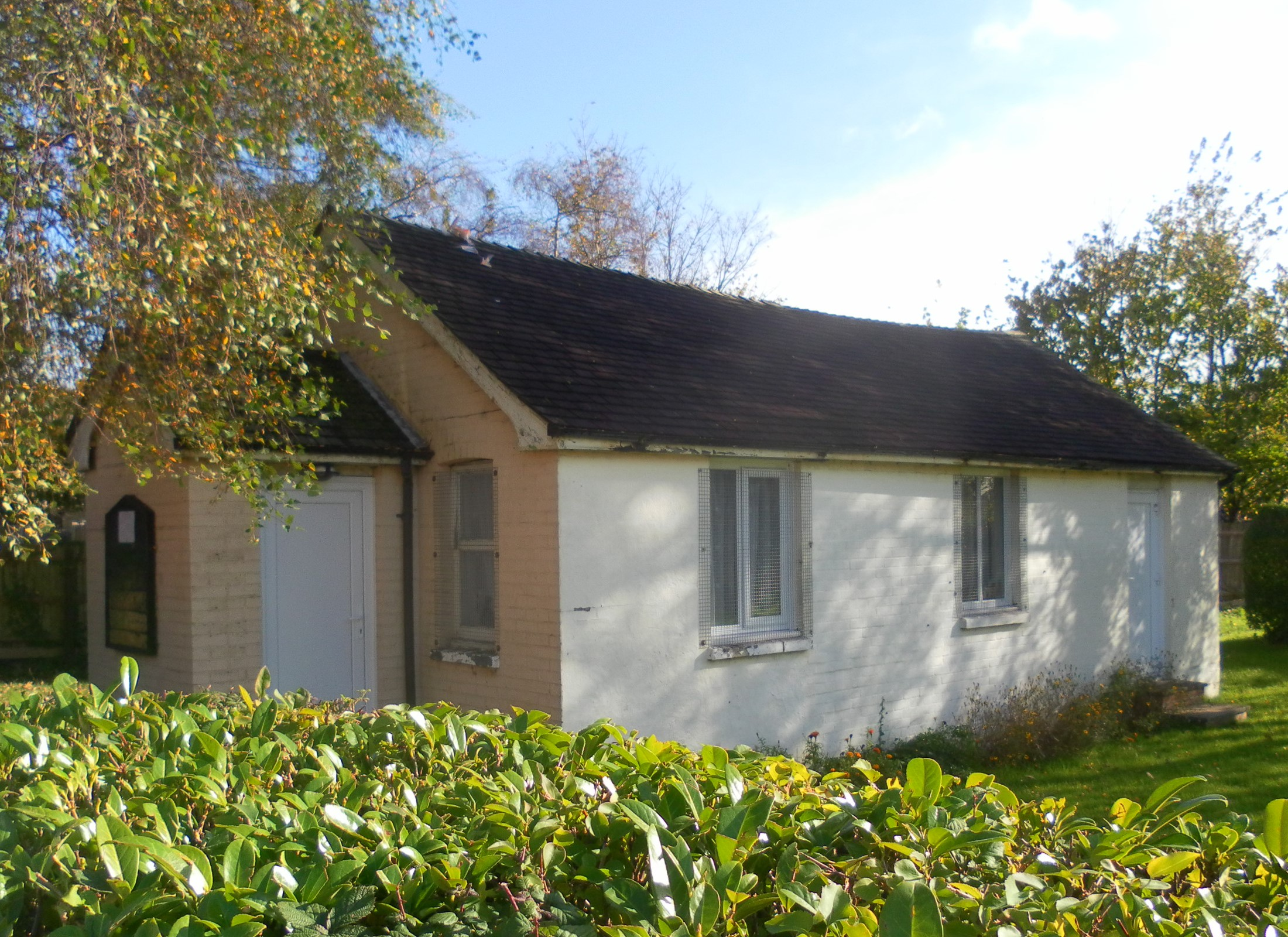
The first permanent church was designed by Fr. Alexis Hauber and opened in 1922.

Mgr Arthur Cocks, who took over from Fr Lynch in 1917, decided that Hailsham would be a more effective Mass centre than the remote hamlet of Upper Dicker. Early efforts to establish a permanent base there faced difficulties: there was little money, Our Lady of Ransom Church could not afford to lend any, there was anti-Catholic feeling in the town, and no premises could be found. Meanwhile, the Catholic resident of Upper Dicker moved to Hailsham and arranged for a visiting priest to celebrate Mass at her new home. Then from 28 July 1917, Mgr Cocks was able to rent part of a brewery and conduct services there. The property on Battle Road (a yellow- and red-brick building of 1887 which still survives) had stables at the rear, and the hay-loft was partitioned to form a rudimentary chapel, accessed by a timber staircase. Masses were held monthly, and congregations soon reached double figures.

Also in 1917, the Archdiocese discovered that land at South Road near Hailsham railway station was owned by a Catholic family. Mgr Cocks bought the site for £564.3s.4d inclusive of legal fees on 23 December 1920 with the aim of keeping it free for a permanent church. The Archdiocese, into whose name the land was legally transferred, lent £500 and Our Lady of Ransom Church in Eastbourne paid the balance. Bishop Peter Amigo stated that the loan was on the basis that a permanent structure—either a proper church or a hall which could be superseded by a church later—would be built, which prevented Mgr Cocks buying a wooden World War I Army hut which had come up for sale for £371 in Dover. The loan from the Archdiocese was paid back in May 1925.

Work on a small (30 by 15 feet (9.1 m × 4.6 m)) permanent hall started quickly to the design of Fr. Alexis Hauber, an assistant priest at Eastbourne. Construction cost £701.10s.3d., and the building opened for worship on 12 August 1922. Another assistant priest from Eastbourne, Fr Alexander Trew, was put in charge. The building was registered for worship in accordance with the Places of Worship Registration Act 1855 on 5 September 1923. It was a brick structure (later painted) with a low-pitched tiled roof.

Mass attendance rose from 29 in the early months at the hall to 70 by 1926, which included Catholics from the nearby town of Polegate (whose own church, St George's, opened in 1938) and villages such as Chiddingly, Hellingly and Herstmonceux. Money was already coming in to allow a larger church to be built: weekly collections were being put towards a building fund, a Catholic from Eastbourne left over £670 in her will in December 1932, and by November 1934 £1,500 was available. When it became clear that no work would start before World War II broke out, some was invested in War Bonds to earn interest.

Writing in 1940 in respect of the previous year, during which thousands of wartime evacuees moved to Eastbourne, Fr John Corballis of Our Lady of Ransom Church reported that "the little church in Hailsham has been so inadequate that a public hall has had to be taken for Sunday Masses". A Nissen hut was also erected in the grounds of the church to provide more capacity on Sundays. Long-planned work on building a larger church had been delayed by the war and the expenditure on St George's Church at Polegate, and it was not until 1952 that architect Henry Bingham Towner of nearby Uckfield was commissioned for the job. He submitted a sketch in February of that year, and the Ministry of Works gave its approval for the work at the end of the year. Bingham Towner was recommended to Canon Corballis by Geoffrey Webb, one of the architects of St George's Church. The foundation stone was laid on 6 June 1954 by Bishop Cyril Cowderoy and the new church was formally opened on 22 May 1955, the Feast of the Ascension, when the Bishop returned to celebrate the inaugural Mass and bless the building. Bingham Towner's design was not adopted in full: what was intended to be a cruciform church was built as a long, narrow nave, small sanctuary, attached sacristy and side porch. It was built by Richard Thorpe Bros. of Southborough, Kent. Joseph Cribb carved the foundation stone and statues of Our Lady and the Sacred Heart, and the "rather imposing entrance doors" were taken from a demolished mansion at nearby Battle. The temporary Nissen hut was demolished in the summer of 1955. Canon Corballis was seriously ill when the new church opened but managed to attend the opening ceremony; he died in December 1955.

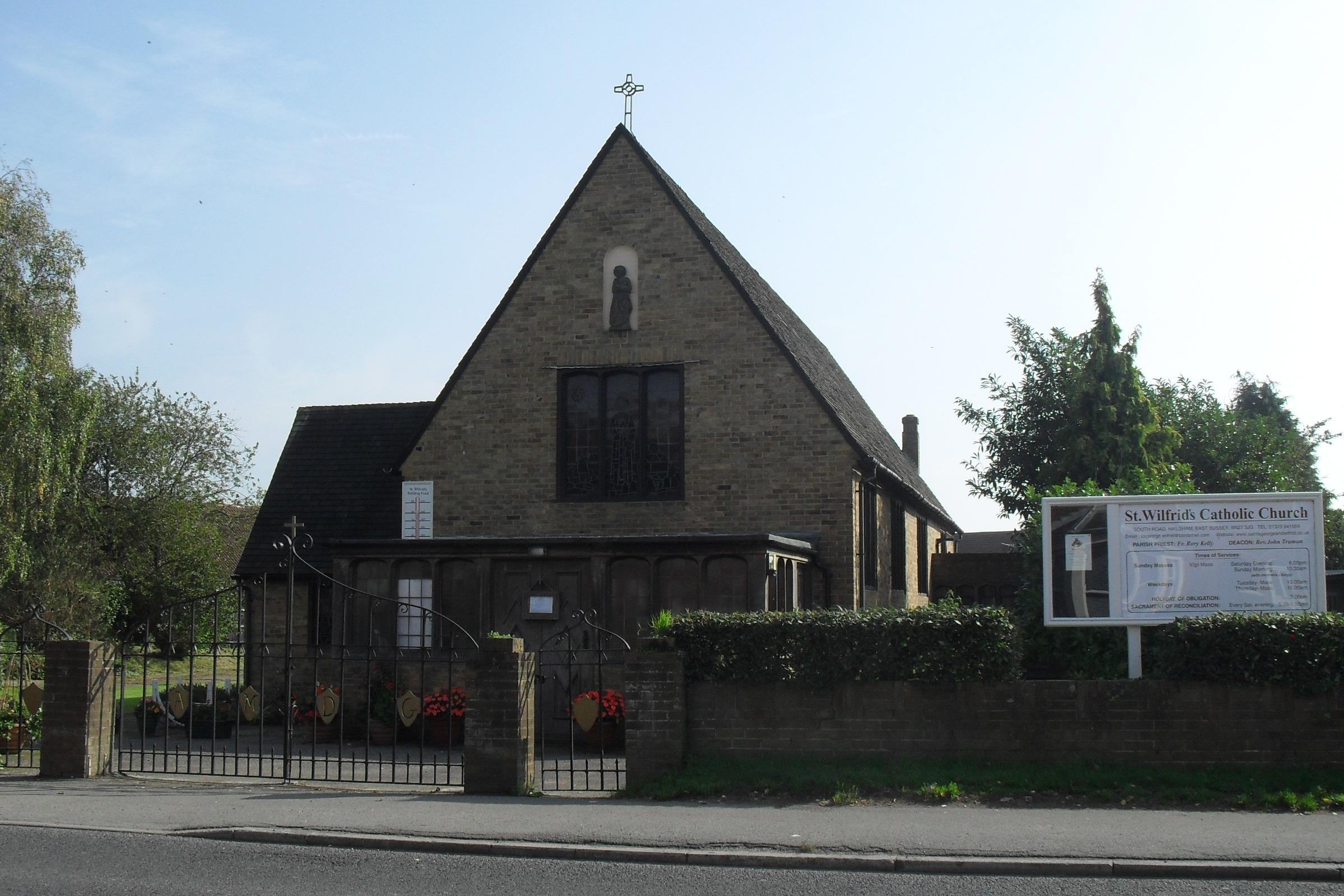
Henry Bingham Towner designed the new St Wilfrid's Church in 1955.

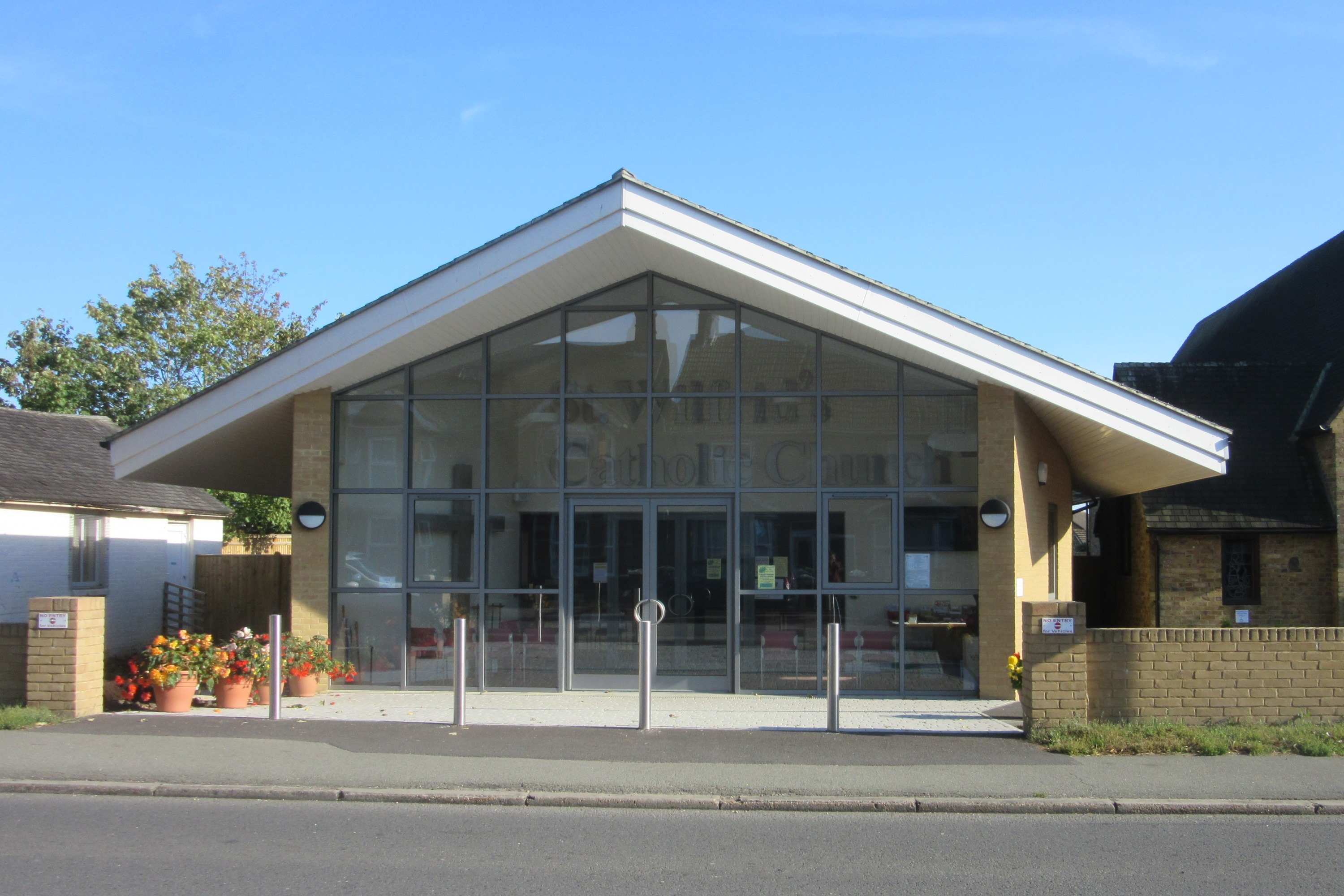
It was replaced by the present church in 2015.

St Wilfrid's Church was cut off from the parish of Our Lady of Ransom, Eastbourne and became the centre of an independent parish from the end of October 1957, initially with the name "Hailsham with Hellingly". Hellingly Hospital was within the parish; it had been served from Hailsham since the 1930s, when a monthly and (from 1937 or 1938) a weekly Mass was held at the chapel there. From the late 1960s part of St Luke's Anglican chapel was used for Masses and reservation of the Blessed Sacrament. Weekly Mass was celebrated there by the priest of St Wilfrid's until 1988. Meanwhile, various improvements were made to the fabric and fittings of St Wilfrid's over the next decades. A new presbytery was built (again to the design of Henry Bingham Towner) south of the church in 1959, which allowed the priest to move out of a nearby cottage. In 1964 a bequest by a parishioner allowed the church and its fittings to be redecorated. Shortly after this the parish priest died, and new Stations of the Cross carved from Bath stone by Joseph Cribb were donated to the church in his memory. In 1966 more extensive structural work was carried out: the original entrance porch was rebuilt as a baptistery, a new font was provided (again to the design of Joseph Cribb—one of his last works before his death) and a new porch was erected, again to the design of Henry Bingham Towner. In 1970 a new Portland stone altar was carved by a local craftsman and presented to the church to commemorate the canonisation that year of the Forty Martyrs of England and Wales, and a stained glass window commemorating Margaret Clitherow—one of the Martyrs—was designed by Kenneth Dunton of Edenbridge, Kent. Also installed around this time was another carving by Joseph Cribb, featuring George slaying the Dragon, which was bought from Cribb's studio and adapted to form a war memorial. George Elliott of Herstmonceux, who provided the altar, also designed an alcove with a "graceful parabolic arch" for the reservation of the Blessed Sacrament.

The church held up to 130 people, making it the smallest of the eight designed by Henry Bingham Towner in the diocese. In the early 21st century it was decided to build another new church on the South Road site and convert Bingham Towner's building into a church hall. Innerdale Hudson Architects of Eastbourne (scheme architect Simon Franks) were commissioned to design the building, and the building contractors were P.D. Harris (Henfield) Ltd of Henfield. The Diocese of Arundel and Brighton approved the scheme in late 2013 and sought planning permission from Wealden District Council in December of that year. The application was approved in May 2014.

Construction was underway in winter 2014–15. The church hall (the original 1922 church) was used by the builders to store materials, so at that time a portable building was erected in the grounds to serve as a temporary church hall. By April 2015 the steel frame of the new church was in place, and all exterior construction work finished later that year. The first Mass at the new St Wilfrid's Church was celebrated on 31 October 2015 (the Vigil Mass for All Saints' Day) after a two-week period when all parish Masses were held at St George's Church in Polegate. Many fittings were moved from the old church, including the Stations of the Cross, altar and font. Bishop Richard Moth, the Bishop of Arundel and Brighton Diocese, consecrated the church on 21 April 2016. It was completed on schedule and under budget; part of the cost was met by parish fundraising events and bequests, which had raised £260,000.

== Architecture ==
Bingham Towner's 1954–55 church, a "pleasant little building" of yellowish-buff brick, with a steep shingled roof and designed in the Vernacular style, was small and unpretentious: Nikolaus Pevsner described it as "modest indeed", even after its porch and sacristy were added in 1966. The "fine oak porch" gave some more emphasis to what was "just a simple rectangular box". The mullioned leaded light windows gave an unecclesiastical appearance reminiscent of a Tudor Revival house.

The new church was designed to be wider than its predecessor, which meant the pitch of the roof (originally planned to be as steep) had to be flattened to avoid affecting nearby houses. The church has an aisled layout with side aisles marked by lower ceilings and large windows, and curves outwards in the middle to provide more capacity. The roof projects beyond the entrance, forming a cantilevered section with large overhanging eaves. The church is built of brick with an extensively glazed façade facing the street.

== Administration and services ==
The church is licensed for worship in accordance with the Places of Worship Registration Act 1855 and has the registration number 65019. It was registered for the solemnisation of marriages on 24 March 1953.

St Wilfrid's Church is part of the Hailsham and Polegate parish, along with St George's Church in Polegate (opened in 1938 and now served from St Wilfrid's). The parish is one of nine (covering 15 churches) which make up the Deanery of Eastbourne and St Leonards-on-Sea. In turn, this is one of 11 deaneries in the Roman Catholic Diocese of Arundel and Brighton. As of 2025 the parish of Hailsham and Polegate is served by one priest who celebrates Mass at 10.30am on Sundays at St Wilfrid's and at 9.00am on Sundays at St George's, as well as a monthly Sacrament of Penance at the latter.

In 2005–06, the Diocese of Arundel and Brighton (Note: This was created out of the Archdiocese of Southwark from 28 May 1965.) analysed the attendance, capacity and parish structure of all of its churches. It reported that one priest served the parish of Hailsham and Polegate, two Sunday Masses were celebrated at St Wilfrid's Church, and the attendance across both was 153 worshippers. The seating capacity was given as 130, although the planning application submitted for the new church in 2013 stated that "up to 100 people [could] be accommodated" in the old church. The new church was required to have a capacity of at least 160.

As originally constituted in 1957, the parish was bounded by the villages of Horam, Vines Cross, Warbleton, Punnett's Town, Three Cups Corner, Rushlake Green, Bodle Street Green and Windmill Hill; then the boundary passed north of Wartling, across the Rickney Levels (near Pevensey) and north of Hankham and Polegate; it then continued towards Ripe, Golden Cross, Whitesmith, Chiddingly and back to Horam. Other villages within this area include Hellingly, Herstmonceux, Lower Dicker and Upper Dicker. The northern section between Horam, Three Cups Corner and Rushlake Green was much closer to Heathfield but was originally an outlying part of the vast parish of Our Lady of Ransom Church, Eastbourne, so became part of Hailsham parish. The anachronism was corrected in 1971 when Heathfield's boundaries were realigned to incorporate this section.

== See also ==
- List of current places of worship in Wealden

== Bibliography ==
- Antram, Nicholas; Pevsner, Nikolaus (2013). Sussex: East with Brighton and Hove. The Buildings of England. London: Yale University Press. ISBN 978-0-300-18473-0.
- Elleray, D. Robert (2004). Sussex Places of Worship. Worthing: Optimus Books. ISBN 0-9533132-7-1.
- Kennedy, Joan (2001). Our Lady of Ransom, in Gratitude and Hope. Eastbourne: Our Lady of Ransom Catholic Church.
- Smith, Lez (2003). A History of the Dicker: Two Sussex Villages. Hailsham: Lez Smith. ISBN 0-9546322-0-6.
- The Diocese of Arundel & Brighton (1988). The Diocese of Arundel & Brighton Diocesan Directory 1988. Crawley: Roman Catholic Diocese of Arundel and Brighton.
- The Diocese of Arundel & Brighton (2019). The Diocese of Arundel & Brighton Diocesan Directory 2019. Crawley: Roman Catholic Diocese of Arundel and Brighton.
- The Diocese of Arundel & Brighton (2025). The Diocese of Arundel & Brighton Diocesan Directory 2025. Crawley: Roman Catholic Diocese of Arundel and Brighton.
- Whatmore, Leonard E. (1972). A History of St Wilfrid's Parish, Hailsham. Hailsham: St Wilfrid's Church, Hailsham.
- Whatmore, Leonard E. (1977). The Story of Our Lady of Ransom Eastbourne. Eastbourne: Our Lady of Ransom Church.
