= St Edmund's Church, Beckenham =

Coordinates: 51.40599°N 0.02958°W

St Edmund's Church
- St Edmund of Canterbury Church
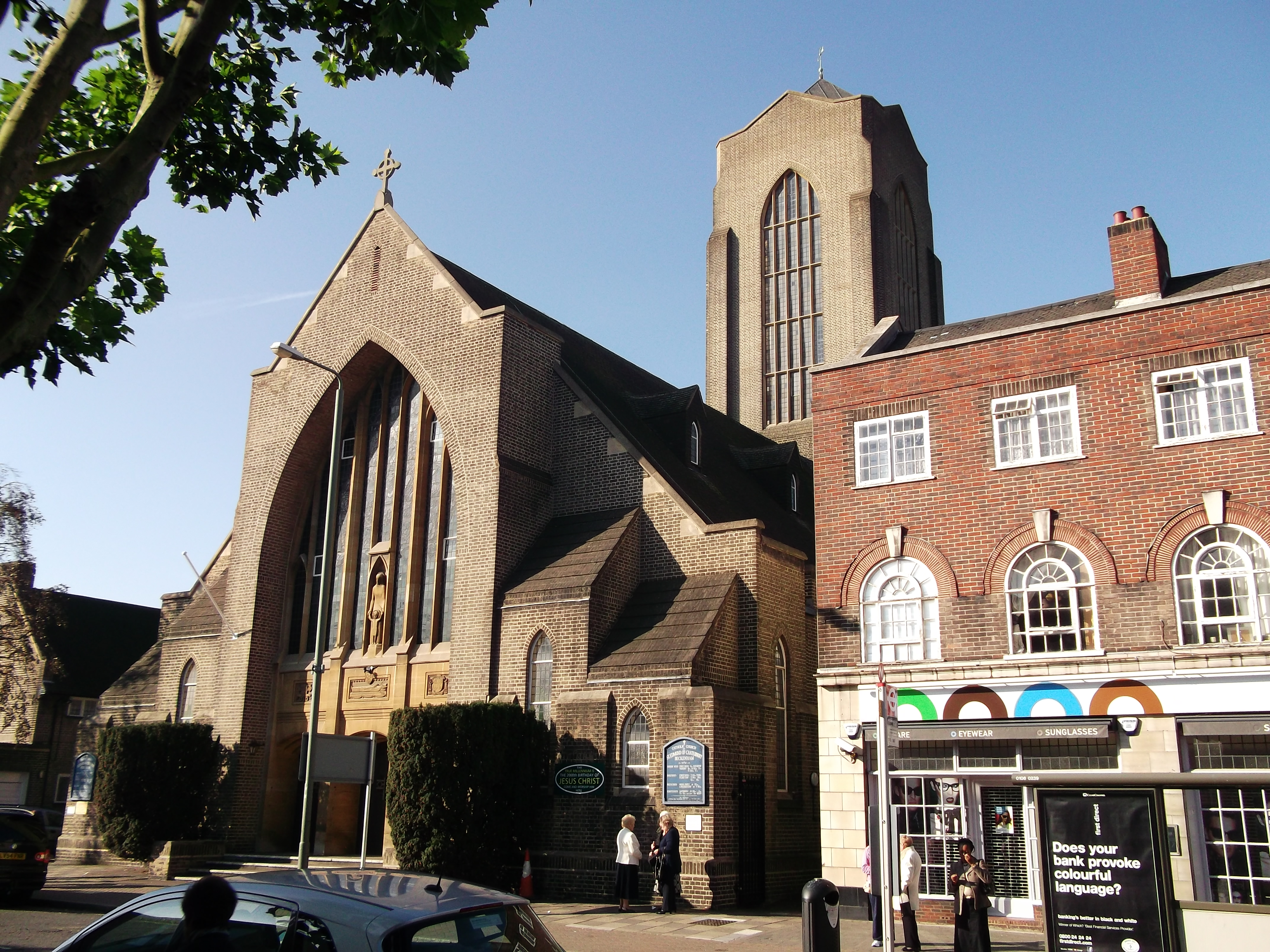
- St Edmund's Church
- OS grid reference: TQ 37146 69282
- Location: Beckenham
- Country: England
- Denomination: Catholic
- Website: SaintEdmunds.net

History
- Status: Parish church
- Founded: 24 April 1927
- Dedication: Edmund of Canterbury

Architecture
- Functional status: Active
- Architect: James O’Hanlon Hughes
- Style: Gothic Revival
- Groundbreaking: 3 July 1937
- Completed: 1938
- Construction cost: £16,500

Administration
- Province: Southwark
- Archdiocese: Southwark
- Deanery: Bromley
- Parish: St Edmund's

St Edmund's Church or St Edmund of Canterbury Church is a Catholic parish church in Beckenham, the Borough of Bromley, London. It was built from 1937 to 1938 and designed by James O’Hanlon Hughes who also designed St George's Church, Polegate. Built in the late Gothic Revival style, it is situated close to the town centre, on Village Way near the junction with the High Street. According to Nikolaus Pevsner's The Buildings of England, the church is "worthy of Sir Giles Scott himself".

== History ==
=== Foundation ===
In 1891, a mission was started in Beckenham to serve the Catholics there. From that mission, a parish was started, and two churches were built before the current one was opened. The first church, on Overbury Avenue, was called the Church of the Transfiguration and St Benedict. The foundation stone was laid on 27 October 1891 by the Archbishop of Southwark, John Butt. The church was designed by R. A. Boase in the classical style. It had stained glass windows designed by Nathaniel Westlake. It was quite small, cost £1,500, and a planned second part of the church was never built, and the church has since been demolished.

=== Construction ===
In 1920, the church got its own parish. A new larger church was needed to accommodate the growing congregation. The site of the current church was purchased and a temporary church was built on the same street. On 24 April 1927, the temporary church was opened. Like the current church, it was named after St Edmund of Canterbury.

While the temporary church was being used, plans were made and fundraising was done for the construction of the current church. On 3 July 1937, the foundation stone for the current church was laid by the Archbishop of Southwark Peter Amigo. The church was designed by James O'Hanlon Hughes. He also designed St George's Church, Polegate and St Thomas More Church in Seaford. He designed the church in a Gothic Revival style reminiscent of Giles Gilbert Scott. The total cost of the church and its furnishings was £16,500. In 1938, the church was opened.

=== Developments ===
In 1938, 1946, 1965, 1969 and 1971, stained glass windows were added to the church. They were made by Hardman & Co. In 1975, the parish hall was built opposite the church. Throughout the 1970s, the altar was moved forward, the canopy and the altar rails removed, and the tabernacle stand was moved to the southeast chapel.

== Parish ==
The church is in the deanery of Bromley, and has four Sunday Masses at 6:00 pm on Saturday, and at 9:30 am, 11:00 am, and 5:30 pm on Sunday.

== See also ==
- Archdiocese of Southwark
