= St George's Church, Polegate =

St George's Church
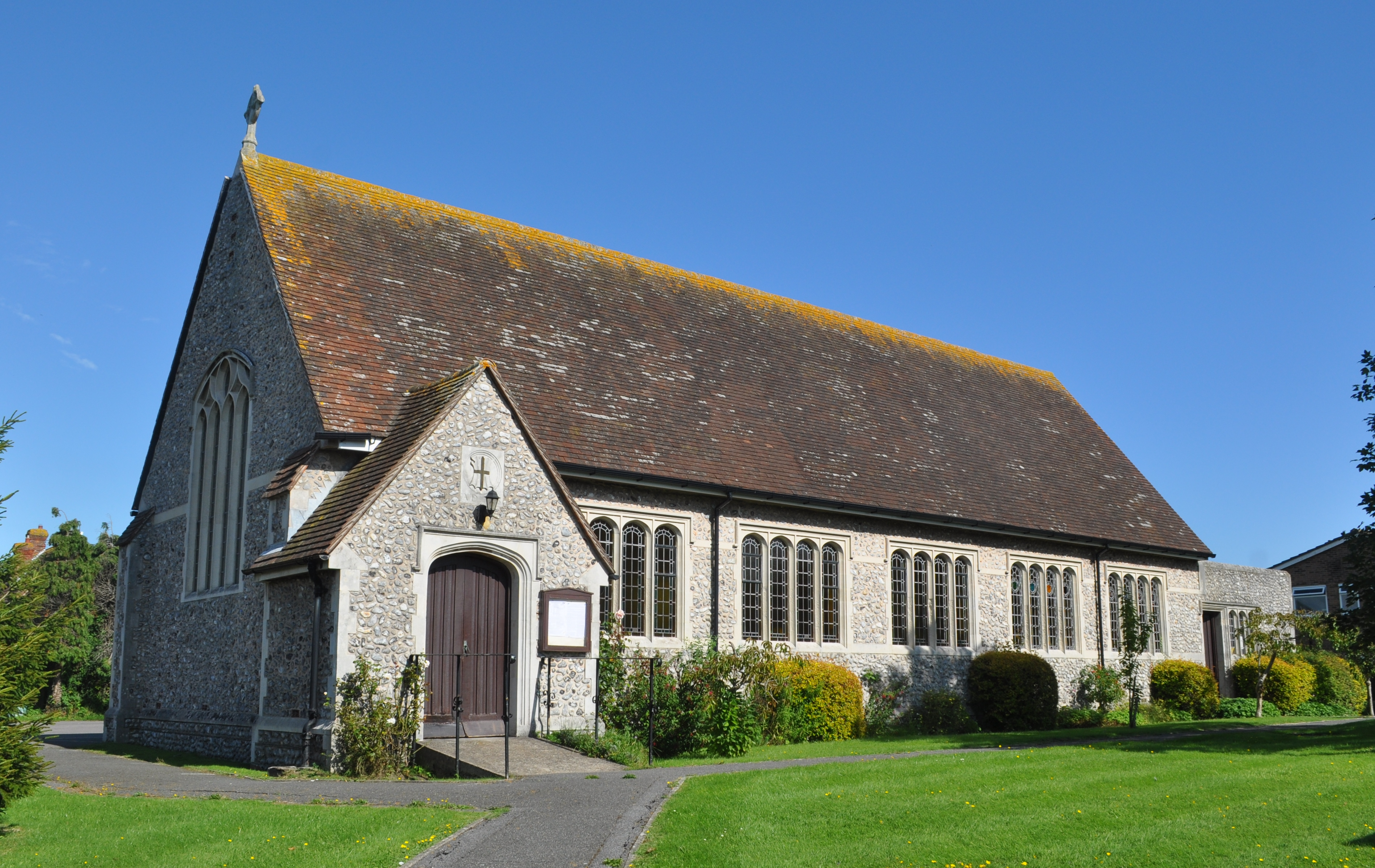
- The church from the west-northwest in 2023

- 50.8188°N 0.2428°E
- Location: Eastbourne Road, Polegate, East Sussex BN26 5DF
- Country: England
- Denomination: Roman Catholic
- Website: saintsgeorgeandwilfrid.co.uk

History
- Status: Church
- Founded: 7 June 1938
- Founder: Fr. John Corballis of Our Lady of Ransom Church, Eastbourne
- Dedication: Saint George

Architecture
- Functional status: Active
- Architect(s): J. O'Hanlon Hughes and Geoffrey Webb
- Style: Perpendicular Gothic Revival
- Groundbreaking: 7 June 1938
- Completed: 7 December 1938
- Construction cost: £4,000 (construction) £500 (fixtures and fittings) £1,318 (land and legal fees) (Contractor W. Llewellyn & Sons)

Administration
- Diocese: Arundel and Brighton
- Deanery: Eastbourne
- Parish: Hailsham and Polegate

Clergy
- Priest: Rev. Rory Kelly

St George's Church is a Roman Catholic church of the parish of Hailsham and Polegate serving the town of Polegate in the Wealden district of East Sussex, England.

Consideration was first given to "bringing the Mass to Polegate" in the late 19th century, when it was a rapidly growing village within the vast Catholic parish of the seaside resort of Eastbourne to the south. Only with the arrival of a new priest at Eastbourne in 1936 was any action taken; but within two years construction work was underway and by the end of 1938 the simple but "very dignified" flint- and stone-built Gothic Revival church was opened. Structural problems occurred after World War II as expenditure was concentrated on other churches in the parish, and remedial work had to be carried out in the 1950s and 1960s.

St George's Church has experienced five changes to the composition of its parish. It was initially a chapel of ease within Eastbourne parish, but in 1958 it became a separate district within Eastbourne with its own priest and two years later became independent of Eastbourne when the new parish of Polegate with Hampden Park was created. Five years later Polegate was separated from Hampden Park, but the two parishes merged again before another change in the early 21st century created the joint parish of Hailsham and Polegate. Weekly Masses are held, and the church is registered for the solemnisation of marriages.

== History ==
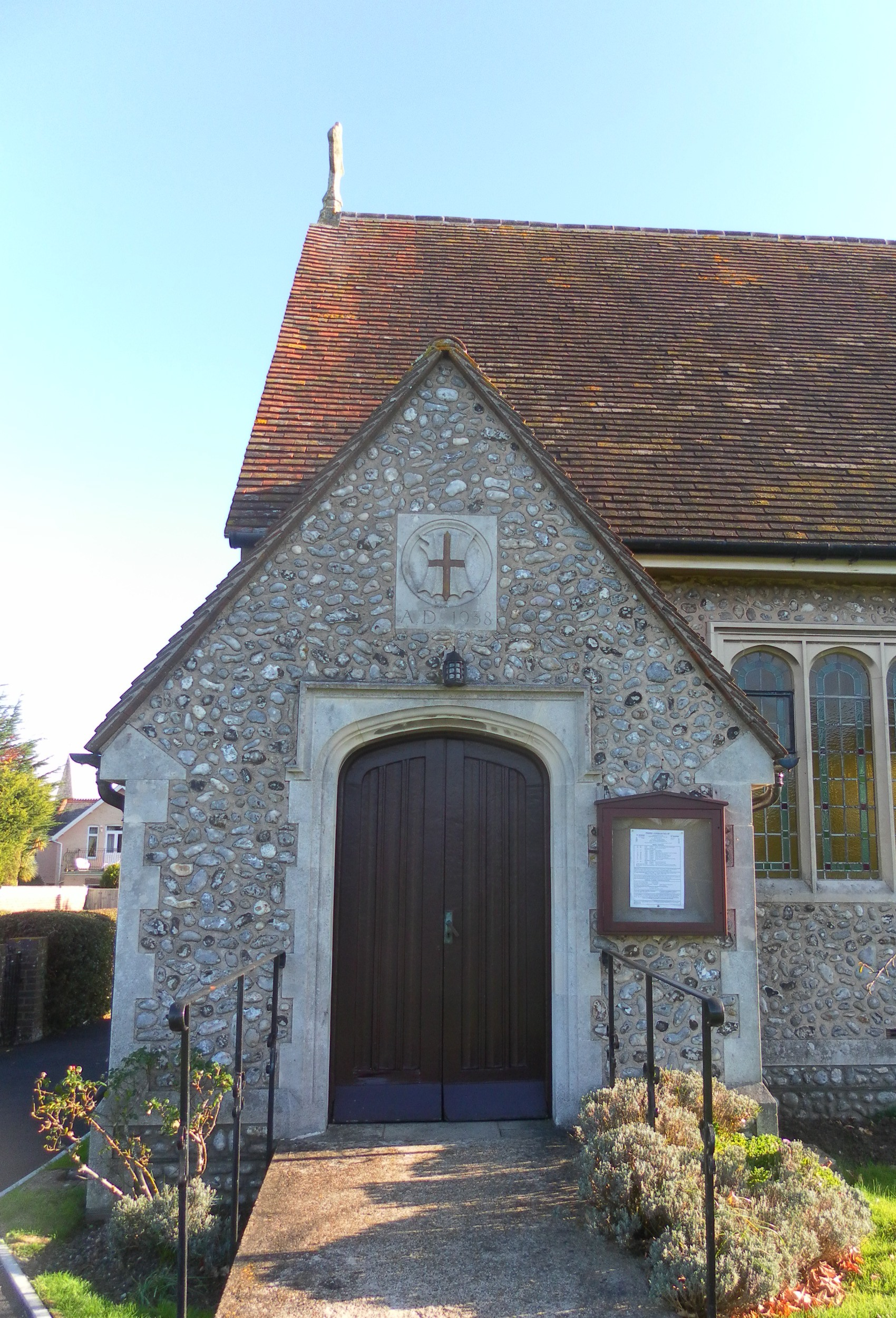
The entrance porch "projects oddly" beyond the nave.

Polegate, originally a small village in the parish of Hailsham, grew rapidly in the 19th and early 20th century after the London, Brighton and South Coast Railway opened two routes which met at a junction there. There were only 50 houses in 1873, but by the early 21st century the population exceeded 8,000 and suburban development linked the town to its larger southern neighbour Eastbourne. Our Lady of Ransom Church in Eastbourne town centre served Polegate as part of its extensive parish. In October 1895, the priest of that church told the Vicar-General of the Archdiocese of Southwark that there was demand for Mass to be celebrated in various distant towns and villages. In Polegate, 5 miles (8.0 km) from Eastbourne, he said there were nine Catholics who could be better served by a local place of worship. In the same year, a man named William Attwood of Osborne House died. The house (no longer in existence) had a private oratory which may have been used for public Masses, although there is no definitive record of this. Nothing more happened until 1913, when another man allowed his house in the Hampden Park area of Eastbourne (close to Polegate) to be used for worship. This arrangement was formalised into a monthly celebration of Mass from May 1919.

Father John Corballis became parish priest of Our Lady of Ransom Church in January 1936 and immediately "set his mind on building a church at Polegate". The following month he paid £1,318.10s.10d. for a plot of land on the southeast corner of the Polegate crossroads—the junction of the High Street and the main road to Eastbourne. This debt was cleared with the help of regular fundraising at that church. Building work on the site was planned to begin in summer 1938 and an architect was commissioned to design the new church. On 7 June 1938, Bishop William Francis Brown, Auxiliary Bishop of Southwark and Titular Bishop of Pella, led a service at which the foundation stone was laid. Building work took exactly six months, and on 7 December 1938 Bishop Peter Amigo and several priests from Eastbourne attended the first Mass in the church, which was dedicated to Saint George. Construction cost £4,000 and fittings cost a further £500, and a balance of £3,000 was outstanding.

At first there was one Mass on a Saturday evening and one on a Sunday morning, and this pattern continued throughout the time the church was a chapel of ease to Our Lady of Ransom Church. Stations of the Cross were installed in March 1939. World War II brought a large influx of evacuees, mostly children, to the Eastbourne area, and many more people attended the churches in the parish: St George's Church was described as "full" each week. Later in the war, as evacuees left and bombing raids made the town unsafe, services at all churches in the parish were cut back and some closed temporarily, but St George's remained open.

After the war, attention turned to providing a larger church at Hailsham, buying a site for a future church at Hampden Park and reorganising the vast parish of Eastbourne. Canon John Curtin, who became priest of Our Lady of Ransom Church in January 1956, decided to create independent parishes for several of the chapels of ease in the parish, including Polegate—noting that this was "in accordance with their express desire over many years". The process happened in two stages. In July 1958 Father John Flanagan was appointed as the first parish priest of Polegate with Hampden Park, although at first it was still a district within Eastbourne parish. St George's Church was not formally separated from Eastbourne until June 1960 when St Joachim's Church opened at Hampden Park and the new parish of Polegate with Hampden Park was formally created. Prior to the opening of St Joachim's, Hampden Park residents worshipped at St Gregory's Church in the Old Town of Eastbourne or at St George's; then from August 1958 Mass was celebrated in a public hall and then in a derelict house in the grounds of which St Joachim's was built.

Meanwhile, as early as 1952 St George's Church was found to have been experiencing subsidence "for some time", and when Canon Curtin took over the church the altar and most of the seats had to be destroyed because they were infested with dry rot and woodworm respectively; the church was unheated, the walls and floor "were of rough uncovered cement", and the site was found to be waterlogged causing the building to be affected by damp. Our Lady of Ransom Church paid for improvements to be carried out, and in 1965 more extensive work was undertaken at a cost of £20,000.

In September 1965 the composition of St George's parish changed for the third time when St Joachim's Church at Hampden Park was given its own parish served by a new priest. Fr Flanagan, who had taken over St George's Church in 1958 when it was separate from Hampden Park but still part of Eastbourne parish, was now in charge solely of Polegate. St Joachim's Church again became part of a joint parish with St George's Church in 1999, but after further reorganisation in the early 21st century the churches separated and a new joint parish was formed covering Hailsham and Polegate. By 2005, St George's Church was served by priests from St Wilfrid's Church in Hailsham, while by 2007 Hampden Park was served from the Church of Christ the King at Langney.

== Architecture ==
St George's Church was built by the firm of W. Llewellyn & Sons and designed by J. O'Hanlon Hughes (Note: A report by English Heritage in 2005 named the architect as "Mr Hughes" and tentatively attributed the church to J. O'Hanlon Hughes, but a definitive attribution was made in The Buildings of England series in 2013.) and Geoffrey Webb. The same architects had worked together in 1935 at St Thomas More Church in nearby Seaford, where the nave, sanctuary and south aisle they designed survive with later additions. Elsewhere in Sussex, Webb was responsible for a stained glass window at Roedean School and a sculpture in St Dunstan's Church, Mayfield, as well as a village sign there. The 1938 edition of The Catholic Calendar and Blotter publication described Hughes as the architect and Webb as a "technical advisor".

The church is a simple building in the Perpendicular Gothic Revival style: a long rectangle with no transepts or side chapels, a single-span gabled roof and a side porch which "projects oddly beyond the west wall" of the nave. The walls are of local flint dressed with Portland stone, and the groups of four slightly arched windows in the side (north and south) walls are set in simple rectangular surrounds. In the east and west walls are taller four-light windows with slightly more complex tracery. The overall appearance is "Gothic, but only just". The interior is also unadorned, with a canted ceiling. At the opening ceremony, Fr Corballis remarked that while "not exotic", the design was "in harmony with the surrounding downland" and "plain … [but] very dignified".

== Administration and services ==
The church is licensed for worship in accordance with the Places of Worship Registration Act 1855 and has the registration number 58747. It was registered to conduct marriages on 26 February 1940.

St George's Church is part of the Hailsham and Polegate parish, along with St Wilfrid's Church in Hailsham from which it is served. The parish is one of four (covering eight churches) which make up the Deanery of Eastbourne. In turn, this is one of 13 deaneries in the Roman Catholic Diocese of Arundel and Brighton. As of 2019 the parish of Hailsham and Polegate is served by one priest who celebrates Mass at 9.00 am on Sundays at St George's and offers the Sacrament of Penance monthly, as well as offering two Masses and the Sacrament of Penance weekly at St Wilfrid's. St George's is one of four places of worship in Polegate town, along with Anglican, United Reformed and Seventh-day Adventist churches.

In 2005–06, the Diocese of Arundel and Brighton (Note: This was created out of the Archdiocese of Southwark from 28 May 1965.) analysed the attendance, capacity and parish structure of all of its churches. It reported that one priest served the parish of Hailsham and Polegate, one Sunday Mass was celebrated at St George's Church, and the average attendance there was 88 worshippers. The seating capacity was given as 100, although a report about the opening service in 1938 stated that there was accommodation for 120 worshippers.

== See also ==
- List of current places of worship in Wealden
