= St Teresa of Avila Church, Chiddingfold =

St Teresa of Avila
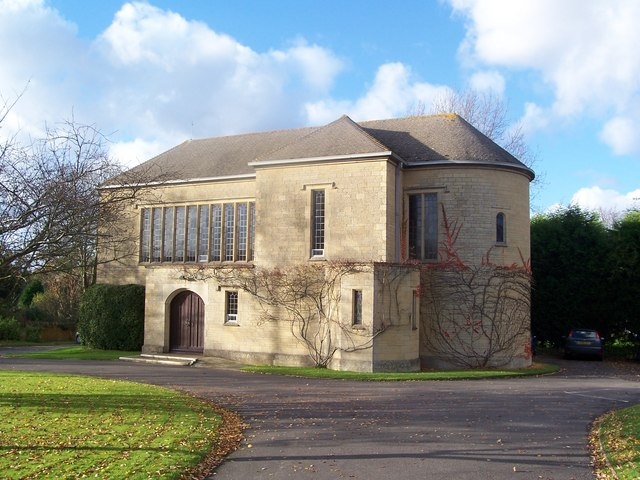
- South side of church
- St Teresa of Avila
- 51.114429°N 0.627919°W
- Location: Chiddingfold, Surrey
- Country: England
- Denomination: Roman Catholic
- Website: CatholicHaslemere.com

History
- Status: Active
- Dedication: Teresa of Ávila

Architecture
- Functional status: Parish church
- Architect: Henry Bingham Towner
- Completed: 15 October 1959

Administration
- Province: Southwark
- Diocese: Arundel and Brighton
- Deanery: Guildford
- Parish: Haslemere, Hindhead and Chiddingfold

St Teresa of Avila Church is a Roman Catholic Parish church in Chiddingfold, Surrey. It is situated on the corner of Petworth Road and Woodside Road in the centre of the village, next to the cricket green of Chiddingfold Cricket Club. It was built in 1959 and designed by Henry Bingham Towner. Although it is not a listed building, English Heritage stated, "The church makes an important contribution to the townscape of Chiddingfold," and that it of all the churches designed by Bingham Towner they stated, "we judge St Theresa of Avila to be the best of the churches we have seen."

== History ==
=== Foundation ===
In 1953, Josephite priests from Barrow Hills School in Witley came to Chiddingfold to serve the local Catholic population. They said Mass in a small hut in the village.

=== Construction ===
In 1959, construction on the church began. The architect was Henry Bingham Towner. He designed the church so that it occupied exactly the same space as the previous building on the site. The church opened on 15 October 1959.

== Architecture ==
The church is cruciform. There is an aisle running down the centre of the nave, parallel to one on the north side. The sanctuary is semi-circular. The ceiling is not separated, there is no divide between the nave, transepts and the sanctuary. The south transept has a porch on its west side, and a side chapel on its east. The north transept is attached to the vestry. The walls of the church are made of stone and the roof is made of slate.

== Exterior ==
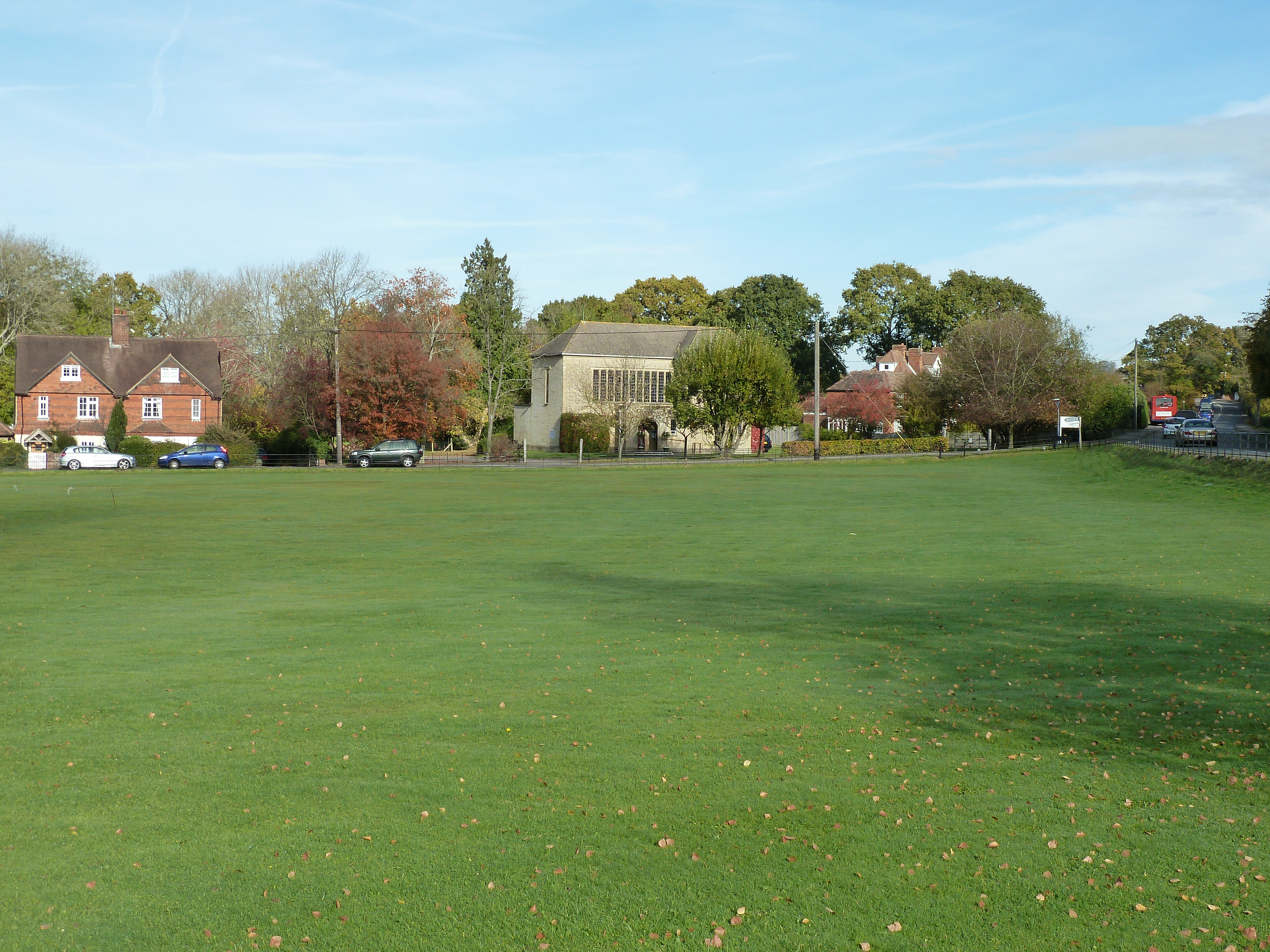
View across cricket green

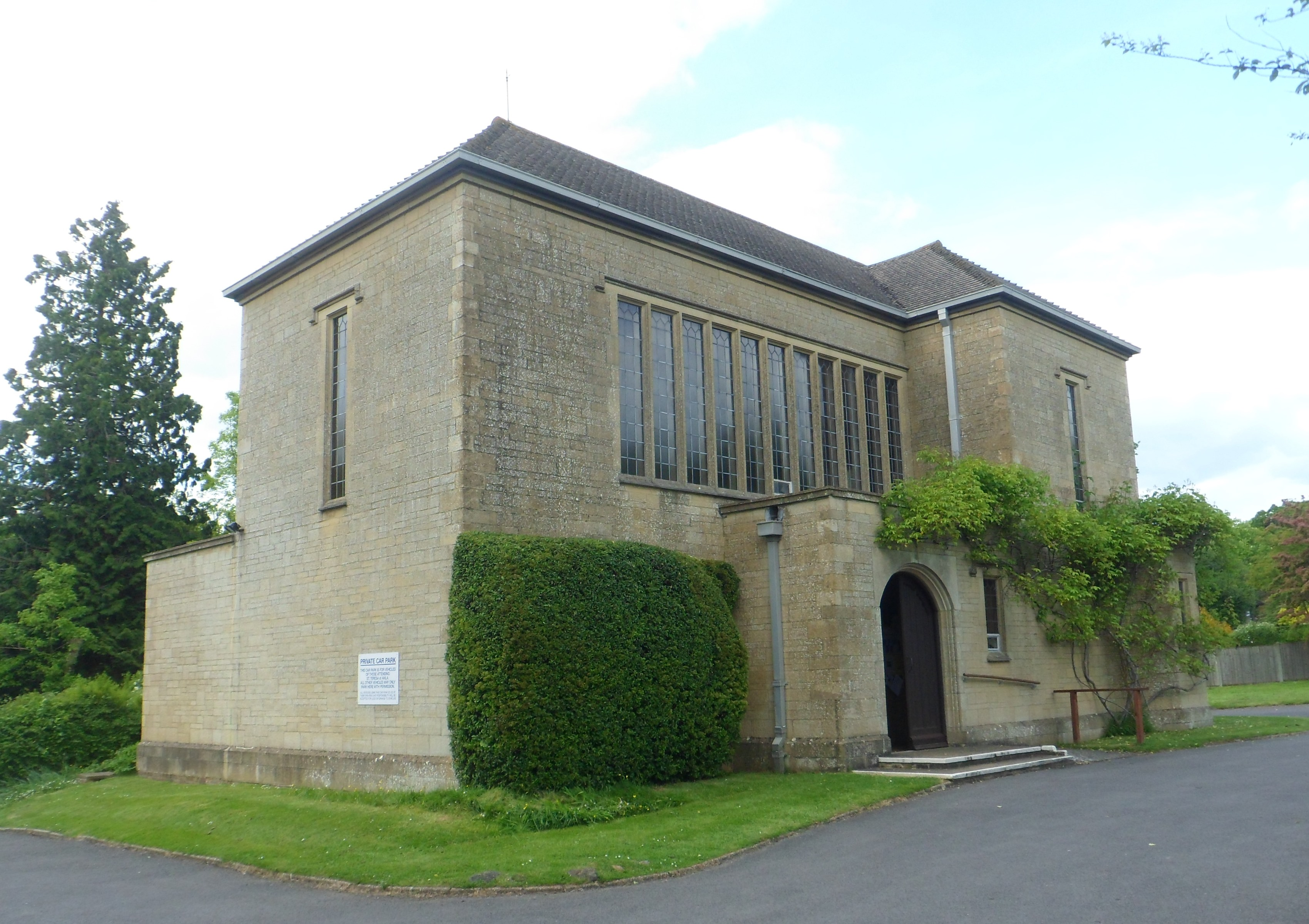
West side of church

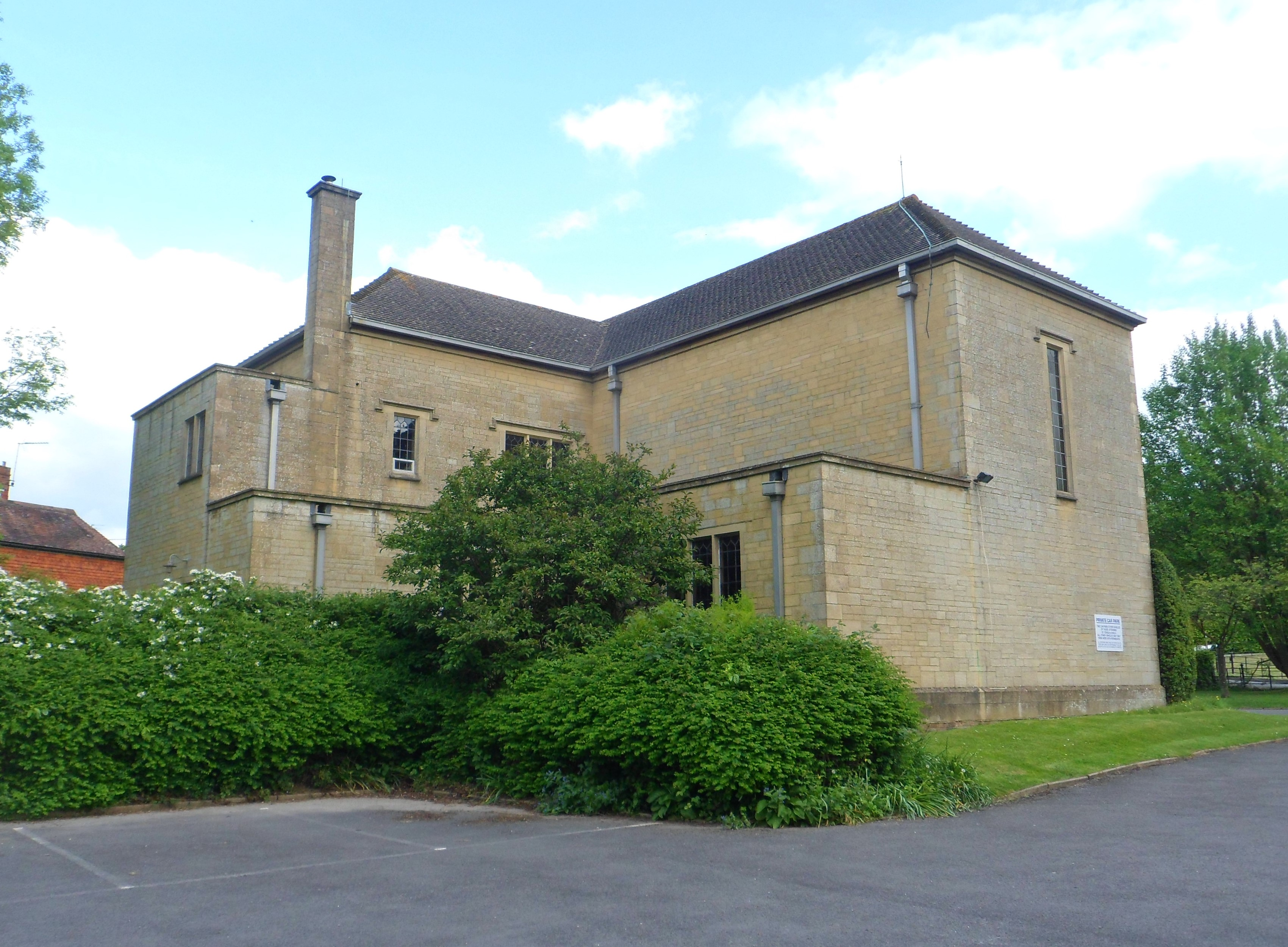
Back of the church

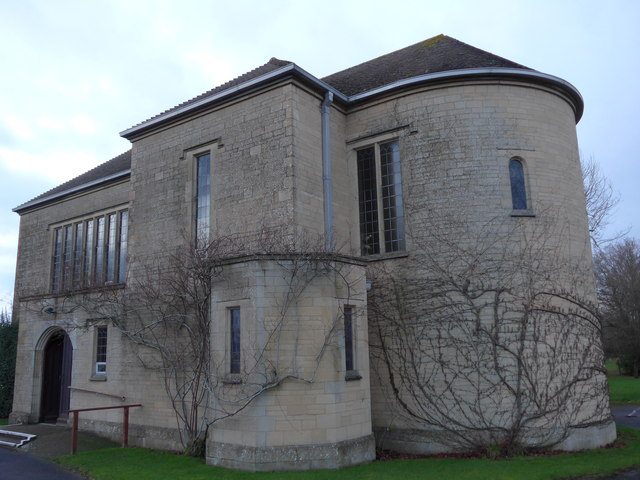
East side of church

== Parish ==
St Teresa's Church is in the same parish as Our Lady of Lourdes Church in Haslemere and St Anselm Church in Hindhead. The parish priest also says Mass at Holy Cross Hospital in Haslemere. Our Lady of Lourdes Church in Haslemere was designed by Frederick Walters and built between 1923 and 1925. In 1937, windows by Geoffrey Webb were installed in the church.

St Anselm Church is in the Beacon Hill area of Hindhead. The site upon which it stands was bought in 1950 for £700. In 1954, the church was open and became its own parish. In the 2000s, the parishes of Haslemere, Hindhead and Chiddingfold became one.

St Teresa's Church has one Sunday Mass at 9:00 am, it also has a weekday Mass at 10:00 am on Wednesday. Our Lady of Lourdes Church in Haslemere has its Sunday Mass at 11:00 am, its weekday Masses are at 10:00 am on Monday, 12 noon on Thursday and 10:00 am on Saturday. St Anselm Church in Hindhead has its Sunday Mass at 6:00 pm on Saturday evening and a weekday Mass at 10:00 am on Tuesday.

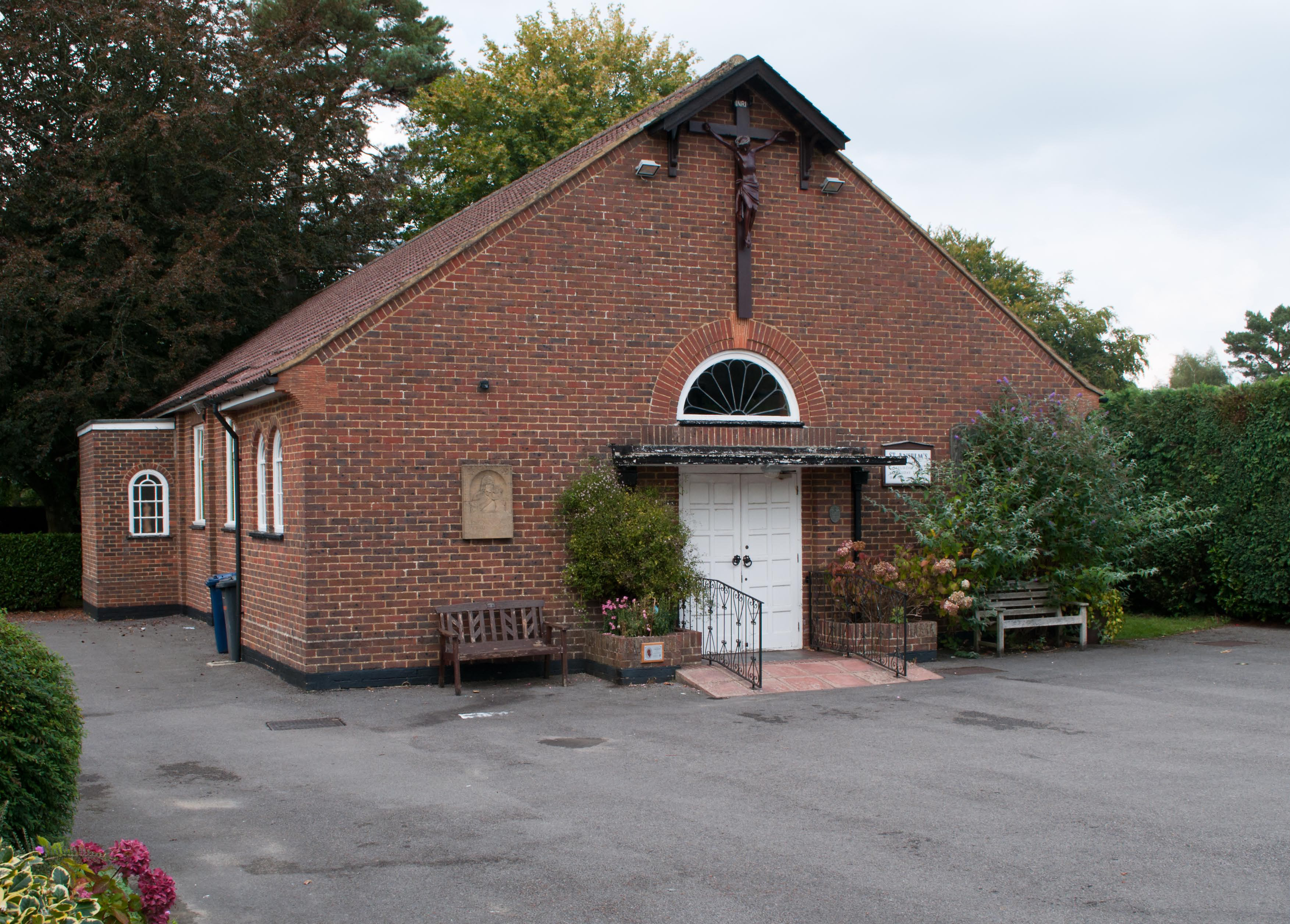
St Anselm's Church, Hindhead

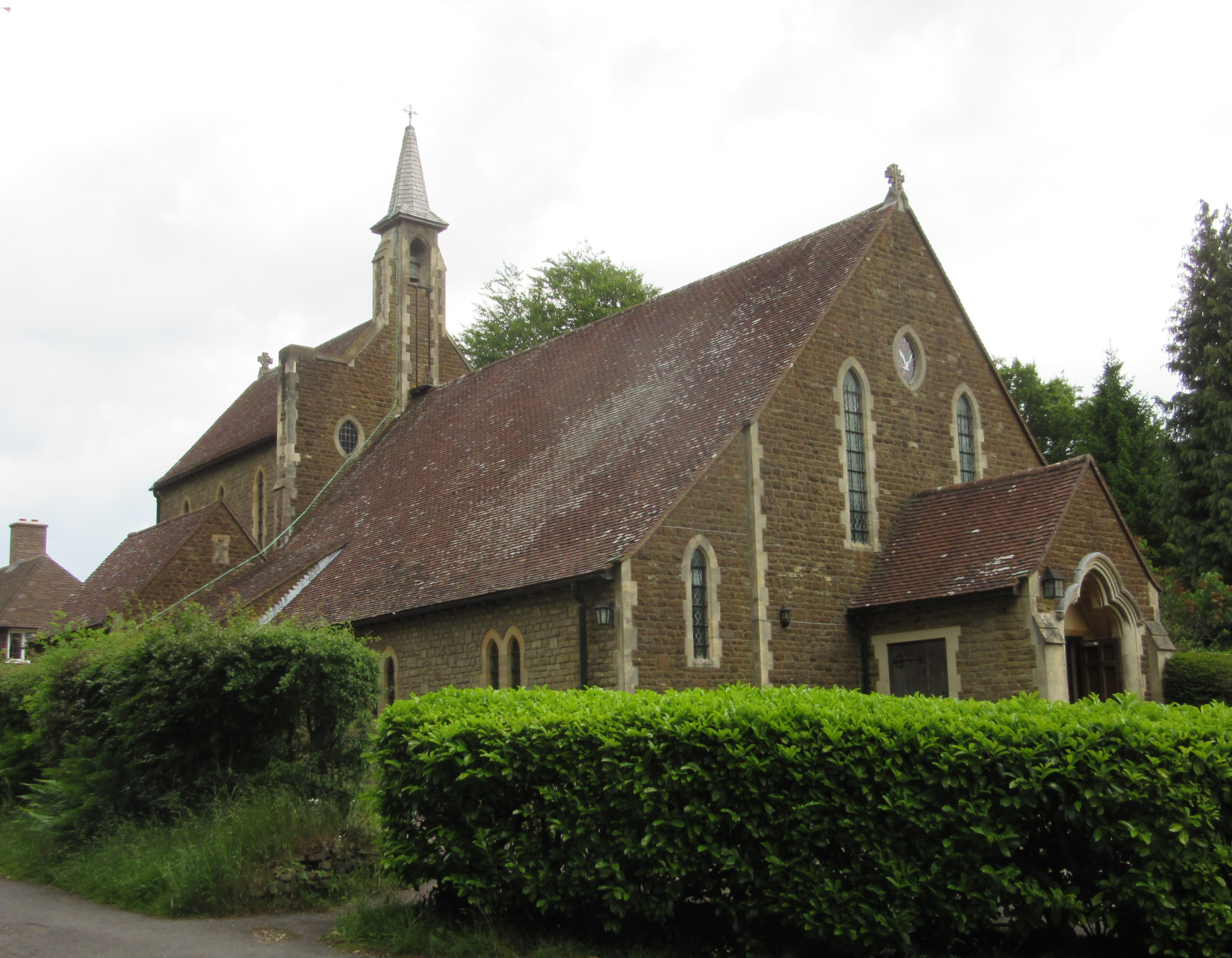
Our Lady of Lourdes Church in Haslemere

== See also ==
- List of places of worship in Waverley (borough)
- Roman Catholic Diocese of Arundel and Brighton
