= Henry Bingham Towner =

English architect

Henry Bingham Towner (1909–1997) was an English architect. He is best known for designing churches in Southern England.

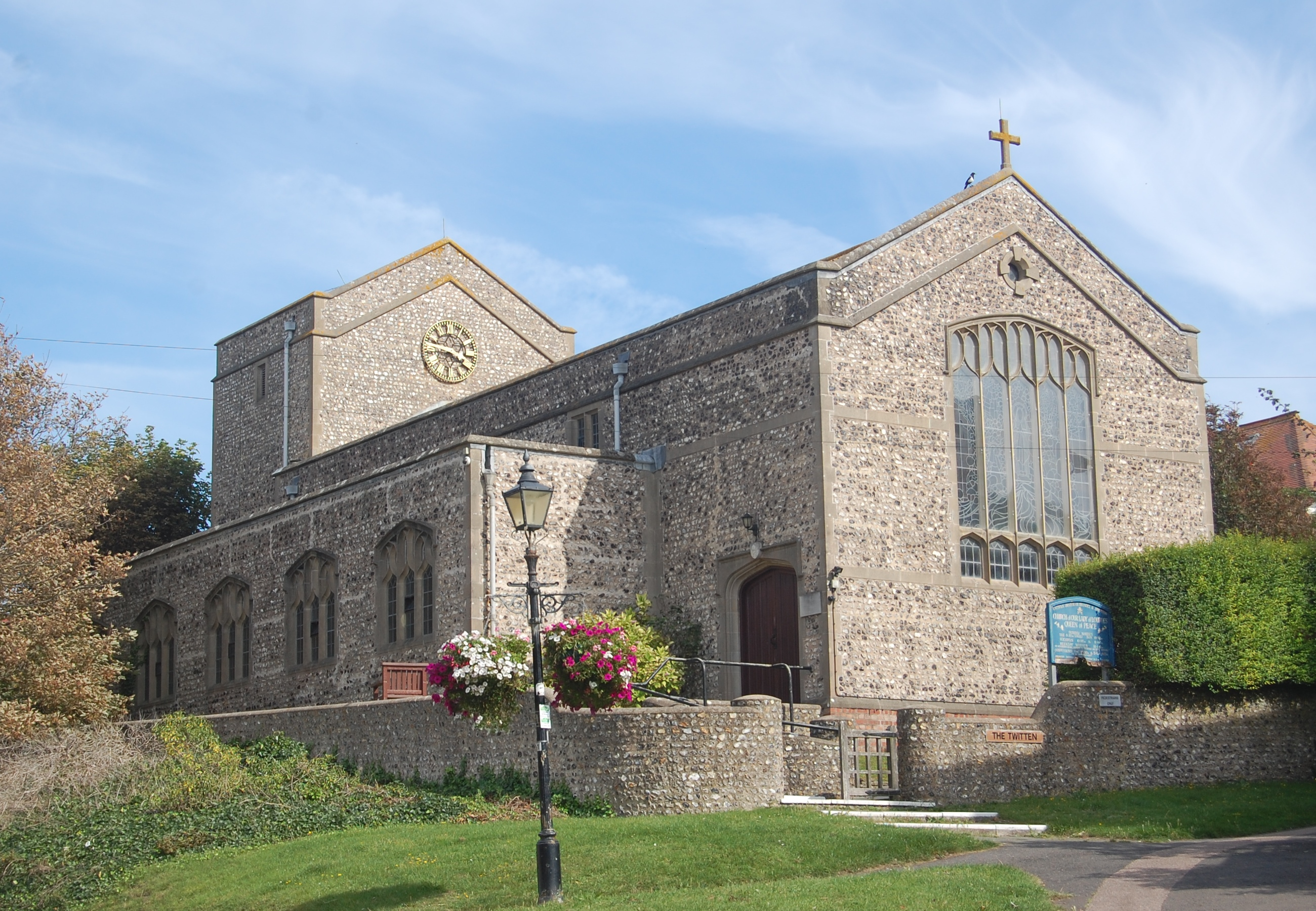
Church of Our Lady of Lourdes, Queen of Peace, Rottingdean, East Sussex, England

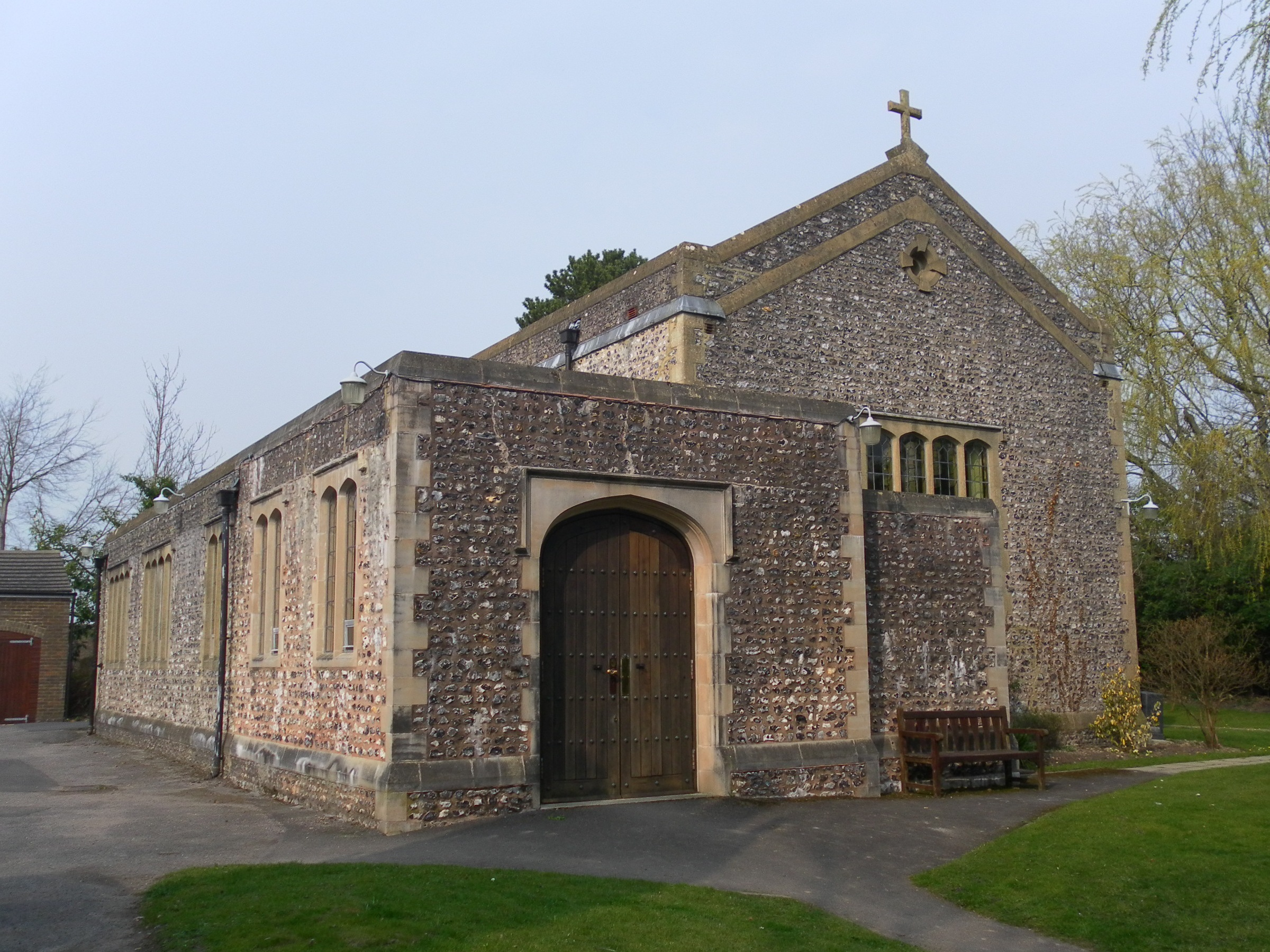
Church of St Thomas of Canterbury, Mayfield, East Sussex, England

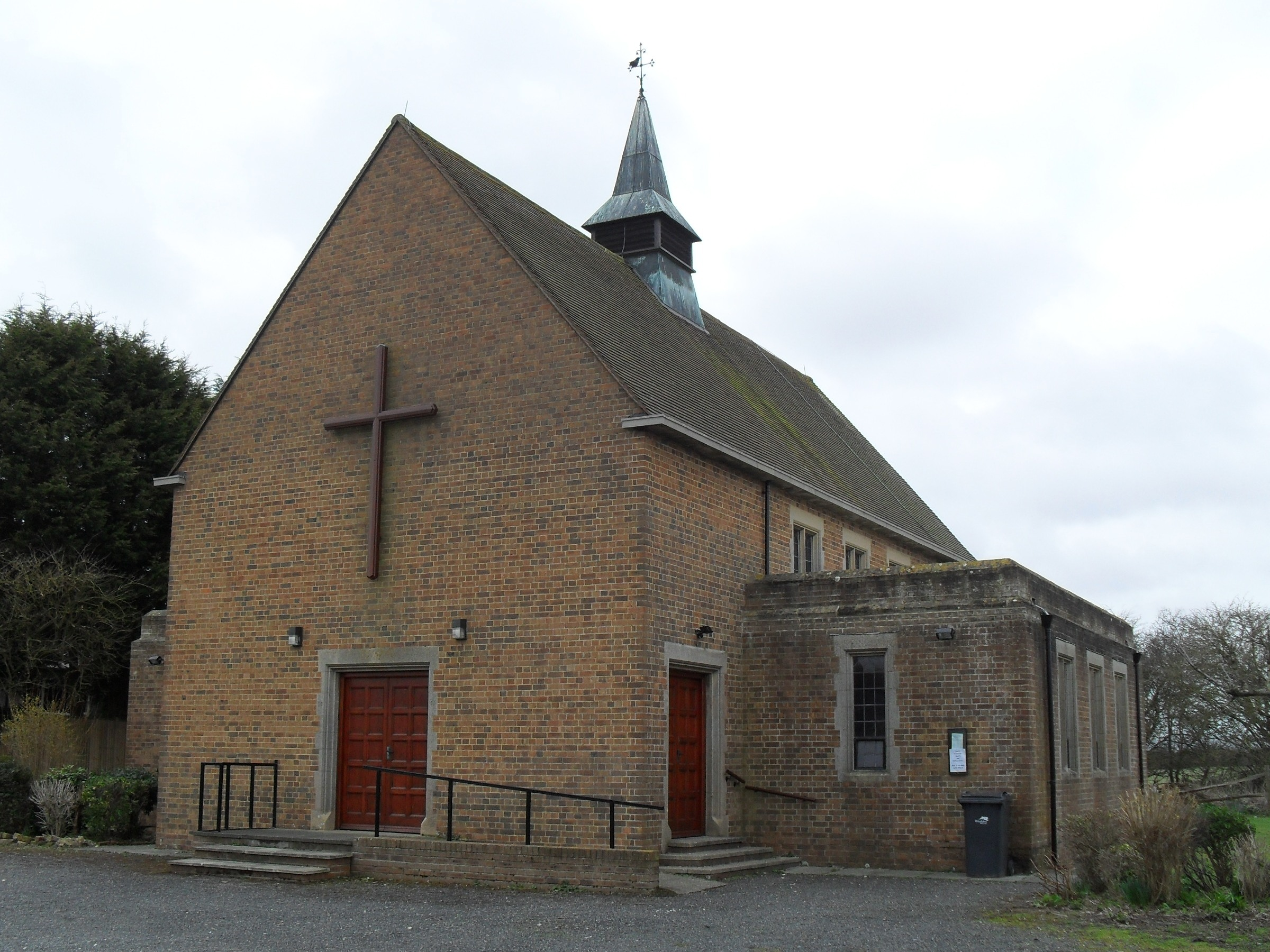
Chapel of the Holy Rood, Pevensey Bay, East Sussex, England

== Biography ==
=== Early life ===
He was born and raised in Uckfield, Sussex. After giving up on becoming a Roman Catholic priest, he studied architecture.

=== Career ===
He started his architectural firm in Uckfield in 1938.

He is best known for designing many churches in Sussex, Kent and Surrey in South-East England, starting in the 1950s. For example, he designed St Wilfrid's Church in Hailsham in 1954. In 1957, he designed the Church of Our Lady of Lourdes, Queen of Peace located at Whiteway Lane in Rottingdean and the Church of St Thomas of Canterbury in Mayfield. In 1959, he designed St John Vianney Roman Catholic Church in Bexleyheath and the Church of St Teresa of Avila in Chiddingfold.

Two years later, in 1961, he designed St Gabriel's Church, Billingshurst and started work on St Michael and All Angels Church in Locksbottom, Farnborough, Kent (completed in 1964). In 1962, he designed St Charles Borromeo Catholic Church in East Worthing, Sussex, and a year later in 1963, St Thomas More's Church in Patcham, a suburb of Brighton. He designed the Chapel of the Holy Rood in Pevensey Bay in 1964. In 1969, he designed an extension to the Church of St Thomas More in Seaford, Sussex and to the St Francis of Assisi Roman Catholic Church in Moulsecoomb, a suburb of Brighton. The same year, he designed St Joseph's Roman Catholic Church in Milford, Surrey. A year later, in 1970, he designed both Christ the King Catholic Church in Langney near Eastbourne and the Holy Family Church in Lancing, West Sussex.
