= Church of St Thomas More, Seaford =

Church in East Sussex, England

Church of St Thomas More
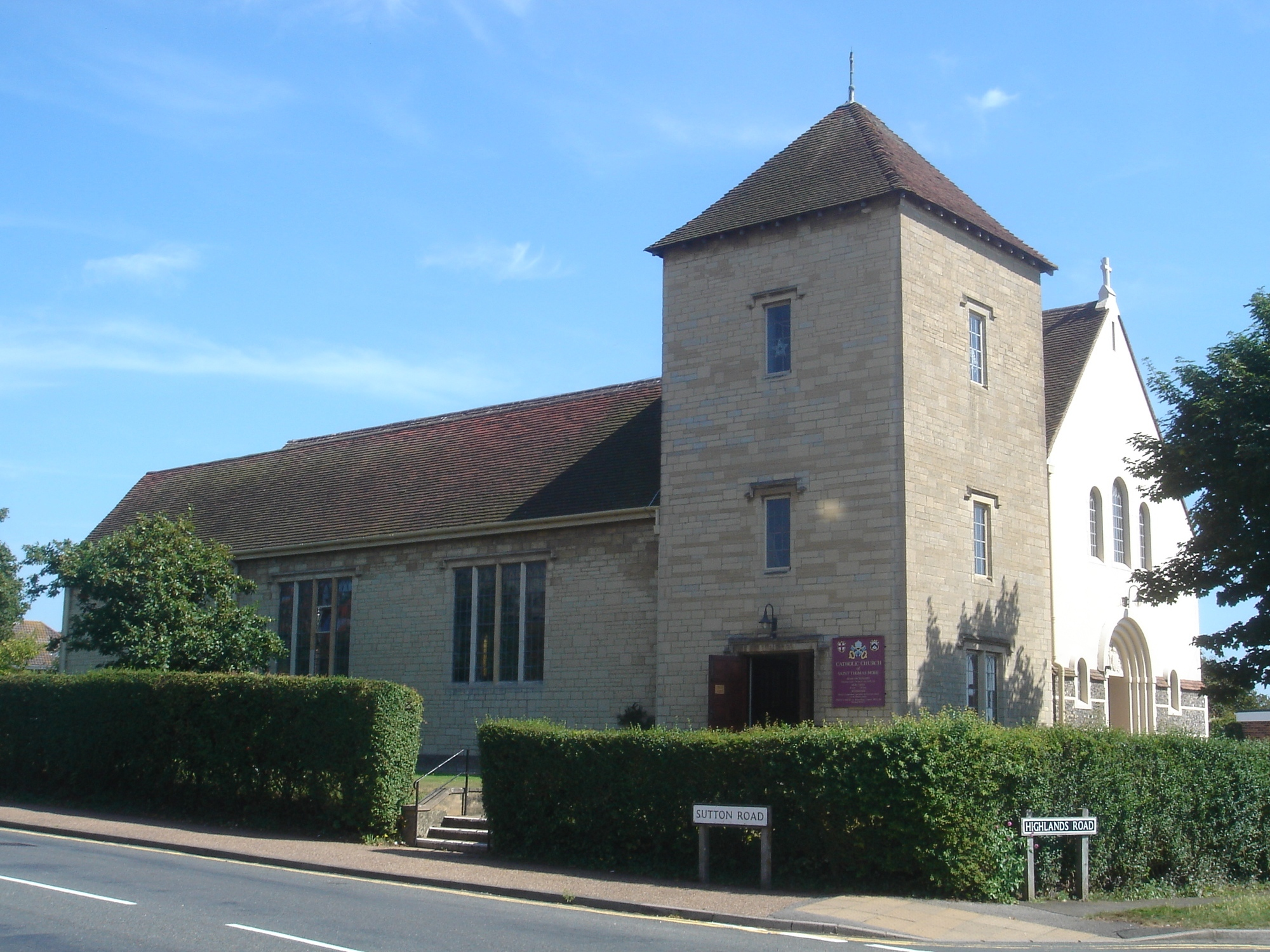
- The church from the northwest
- Church of St Thomas More
- 50.7739°N 0.1073°E
- Location: 54 Sutton Road, Seaford, East Sussex BN25 1SS
- Country: England
- Denomination: Roman Catholic
- Website: www.st-thomas-more.co.uk

History
- Status: Church
- Founded: 1935
- Dedication: Thomas More
- Events: 1969: extended by Henry Bingham Towner

Architecture
- Functional status: Active
- Architects: James O'Hanlon Hughes; >Geoffrey Welch
- Completed: 12 March 1936

Administration
- Diocese: Arundel and Brighton
- Deanery: Eastbourne
- Parish: Seaford

Clergy
- Pastor: Fr Michael Faneye MSP

The Church of St Thomas More is the Roman Catholic parish church in Seaford, East Sussex, England. It has a congregation of around 200 people, and the current Priest is Fr Michael Faneye

== Layout ==
The church is built in the traditional shape of a cross, with four aisles and the altar facing the parishioners at the head. The north aisle is the longest, as it stretches around the side of the altar. The two central aisles are directly facing the altar, whilst the south aisle is facing the lady altar. The south aisle also has the confessional and a library at the back. The church has an organ-loft, which is used when the church becomes very busy. At the front, is a small ashes cemetery and a car park. The church has two entrances, one of which is used regularly and another for special occasions only. The priest's house is connected to the church, as is the parish hall.

== History ==
At the beginning of the 20th century, Seaford had only six Roman Catholics. Shortly after, the Bishop of Southwark, Francis Bourne, built a chapel dedicated to St Francis de Sales, next to his holiday home, which was called Annecy. In 1903, a group of nuns called the Sisters of Providence bought it and turned it into a convent and school.

Mass was regularly led by Father Berchmans, but he died suddenly in 1927. The bishop then appointed Fr. Reginald Webb as the first parish priest. As the Catholic population of 100 was now too big for the chapel, they moved to the hall in Annecy School. Numbers continued to rise and in 1935, a new church was founded. It was opened on 12 March 1936. The overall cost was £10,000 and by now, attendance figures had risen to 250.

In 1962, Father Webb died and was replaced as parish priest, by Fr William Guinane. In 1970, he lengthened the south aisle and added a north aisle and tower. In 1965, the church became part of the newly formed Diocese of Arundel and Brighton. In 1980, Fr Kenneth McCarthy took over from Fr William Guinane and became the third parish priest. He built a hall and car park, before being replaced in 1990 by Father Chris Benyon, due to ill health.

Father Chris Benyon supported musical groups at the church. In 1999, he left the parish and Father Tony Churchill stepped in. In 2004, Annecy school celebrated its centenary, in a service with over 500 people led by Bishop Kerian Conry. Father Niven Richardson replaced Father Tony Churchill as parish priest in 2007.

The church is licensed for worship in accordance with the Places of Worship Registration Act 1855 and has the registration number 56568.

== Parish priests ==
- Fr Reginald Webb (1927–1962)
- Fr William Guinane (1963–1980)
- Fr Kenneth McCarthy (1980–1990)
- Fr Chris Benyon (1990–1999)
- Fr Anthony Churchill (1999–2007)
- Fr Niven Richardson (2007–2011)
- Fr Paul Jennings (2011–2019 )
- Fr Ian Byrnes (2019–2022)
- Deacon Stephen Sharpe (2022-2026)
- Fr Michael Faneye MSP (2026-)
