= Our Lady of Ransom Church, Eastbourne =

Our Lady of Ransom Church
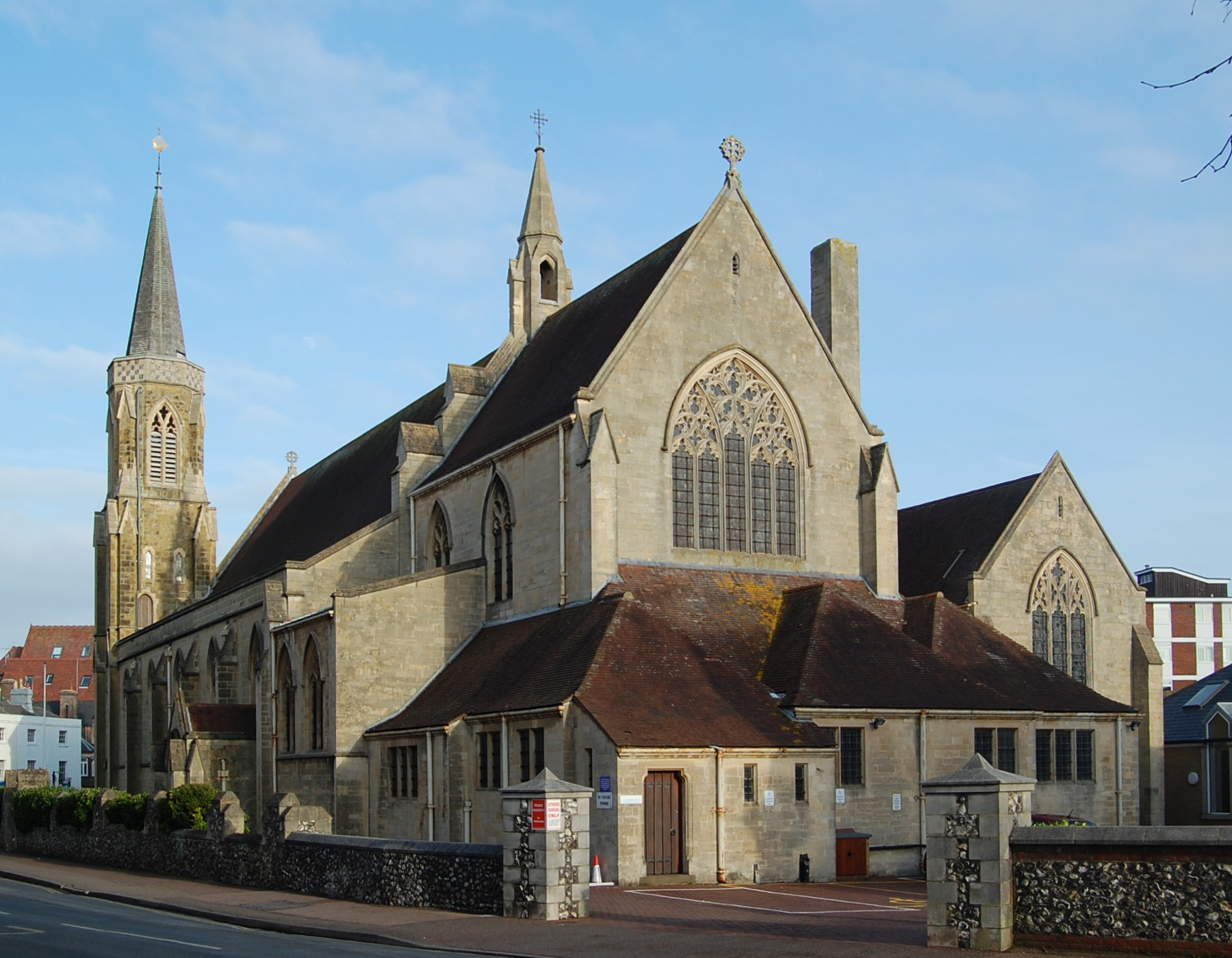
- Our Lady of Ransom Church
- 50.7661°N 0.2777°E
- Location: Eastbourne, East Sussex
- Country: England
- Denomination: Roman Catholic
- Website: EastbourneCatholicChurches.co.uk

History
- Status: Active
- Dedication: Our Lady of Ransom

Architecture
- Functional status: Parish church
- Heritage designation: Grade II listed
- Designated: 22 October 1998
- Architect: Frederick Walters
- Groundbreaking: 1890
- Completed: 1903

Administration
- Province: Province of Southwark (since 1965)
- Diocese: Diocese of Arundel and Brighton (since 1965)
- Deanery: Eastbourne
- Parish: Eastbourne

Our Lady of Ransom Church is a Roman Catholic Parish church in Eastbourne, East Sussex. It was founded as a mission in 1869, built from 1900 to 1903, and had extensions completed in 1926. It is situated on the corner of Meads Road and Grange Road, opposite Eastbourne Town F.C. in the centre of the town. It was designed by Frederick Walters and is a Grade II listed building.

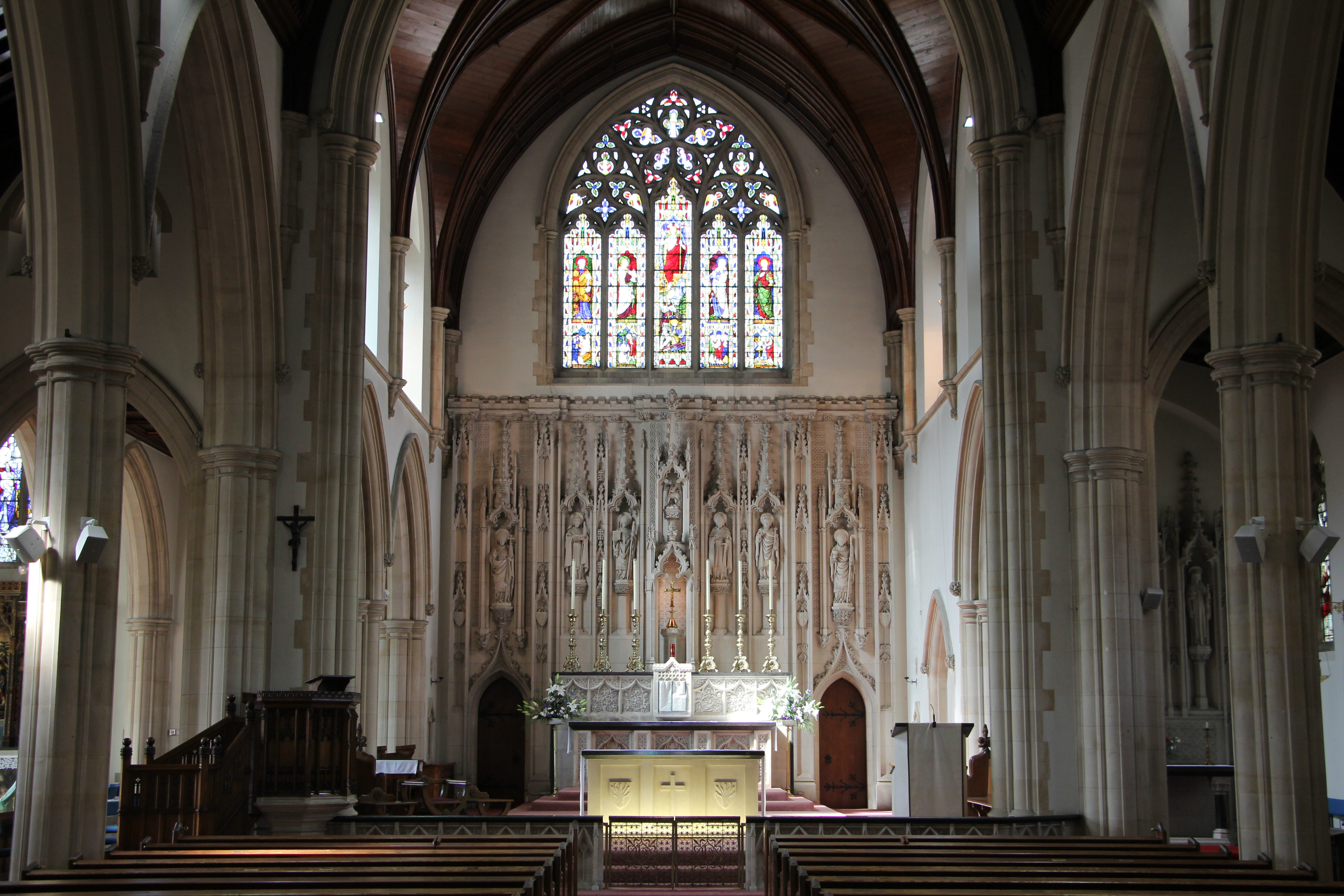
Interior

== History ==
=== Foundation ===
On 29 May 1867, a mission started in the town to serve the local Roman Catholic population. It was in 42 Ceylon Place in the town. The first priest was Fr Charles P. King. In less than a year after the mission began, Fr King paid for a chapel, made of brick, to be built on Junction Road. On 1 April 1869, it was opened. It was dedicated to Stella Maris.

On 14 April 1890, the old Our Lady of Ransom Church was opened by Fr Charles Stapley. It was a temporary church close to Grove Road. It was previously the market hall and it became a garage for the police station. For the next ten years attempts were made to build a permanent church in the town. In February 1893, Fr King left Eastbourne. On 23 September 1895, St Joseph's Catholic School was opened.

=== Construction ===
Before 1900, the site of the present church was bought. On 11 December 1900, the foundation stone of the church was laid. The architect was Frederick Walters and he designed the church in the Gothic Revival style. The total cost of the construction of the church came to £11,000. On 15 December 1901, the church was opened by the Bishop of Southwark, Francis Bourne, who went on to become a cardinal and Archbishop of Westminster. In 1903, the church was completed, with the exception of the tower. By that time, the priest of the church was Fr Paul Lynch. In 1912, the church's tower and spire were completed. On 11 February 1926, various church extensions, such as the chancel, lady chapel and sacristy, were completed and the church was reopened. On 8 July 1926, the church was consecrated.

In 1995, further work on the church was completed after a new altar was installed and the sanctuary refurbished.

== Parish ==
Our Lady of Ransom Church is part of the same Eastbourne parish as St Agnes Church on Whitley Road in Roselands, Eastbourne, and St Gregory's Church on Victoria Drive in Downside, Eastbourne. St Agnes Church was founded in 1895 as a mission in St Joseph’s School. In 1906, Agnes Zimmermann gave £1,500 to build the church. On 28 September 1906, the foundation stone was laid. On 6 March 1907, the church was opened. The architect was Percy Dulvey Stonham (1877-1942). With the opening of St Richard's Catholic College in Bexhill-on-Sea in 1959 and St Thomas a Becket infant and junior schools from 1973 to 1974, St Joseph's School closed and became a centre for St Agnes' church.

St Gregory's Church was originally built in 1934 as a timber church at a cost of £1,000. In 1965, building work on the present church started. Construction cost £43,000. It was designed by Gordon Robins of the architectural firm B. Stevens & Partners, headed by A. J. M. McDonough, and the builders were C. Bainbridge & Sons Ltd. On 8 December 1966, the church was opened. The old timber church still exists to the north of the present church.

Our Lady of Ransom Church has three Sunday Masses at 6:00pm on Saturday and 10:15am and 5:30pm on Sunday. St Agnes Church has one Sunday Mass at 11:30am. St Gregory's Church has one Sunday Mass at 9:00am.

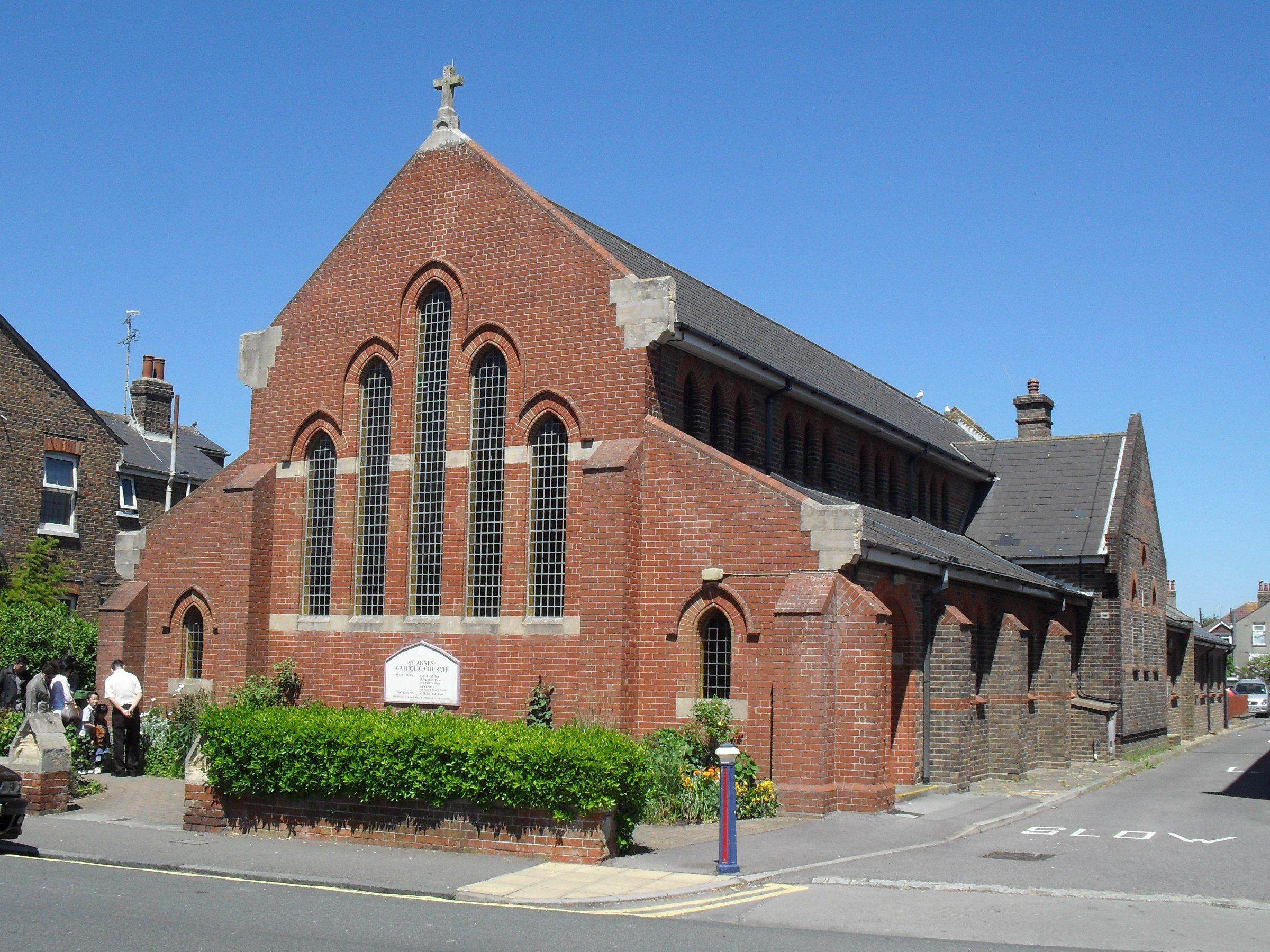
St Agnes Church, Eastbourne

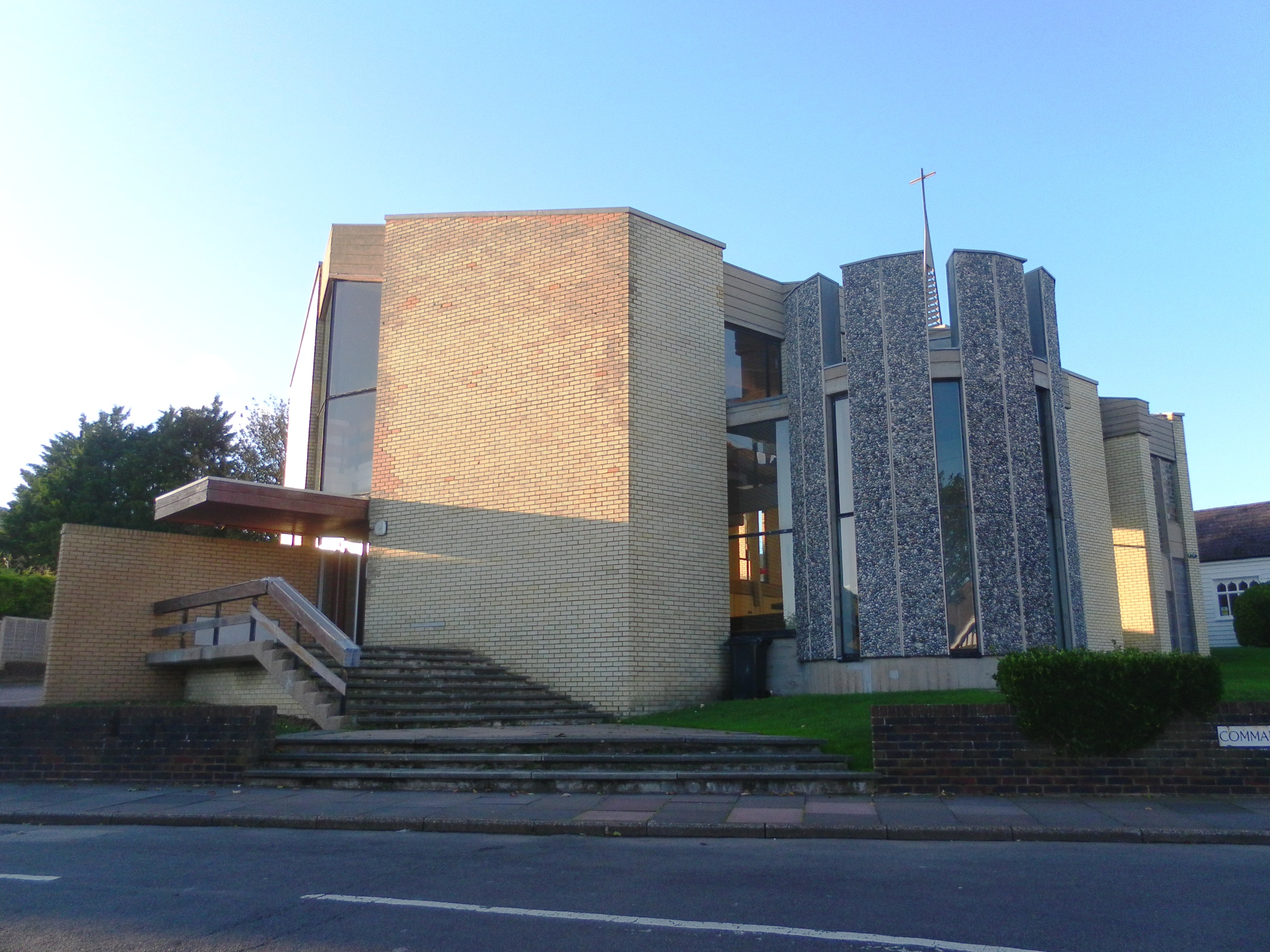
St Gregory's Church, Eastbourne

== See also ==
- Listed buildings in Eastbourne
- List of places of worship in Eastbourne
- Roman Catholic Diocese of Arundel and Brighton
