= Surrey Wildlife Trust =

Wildlife and nature charity in Surrey, England

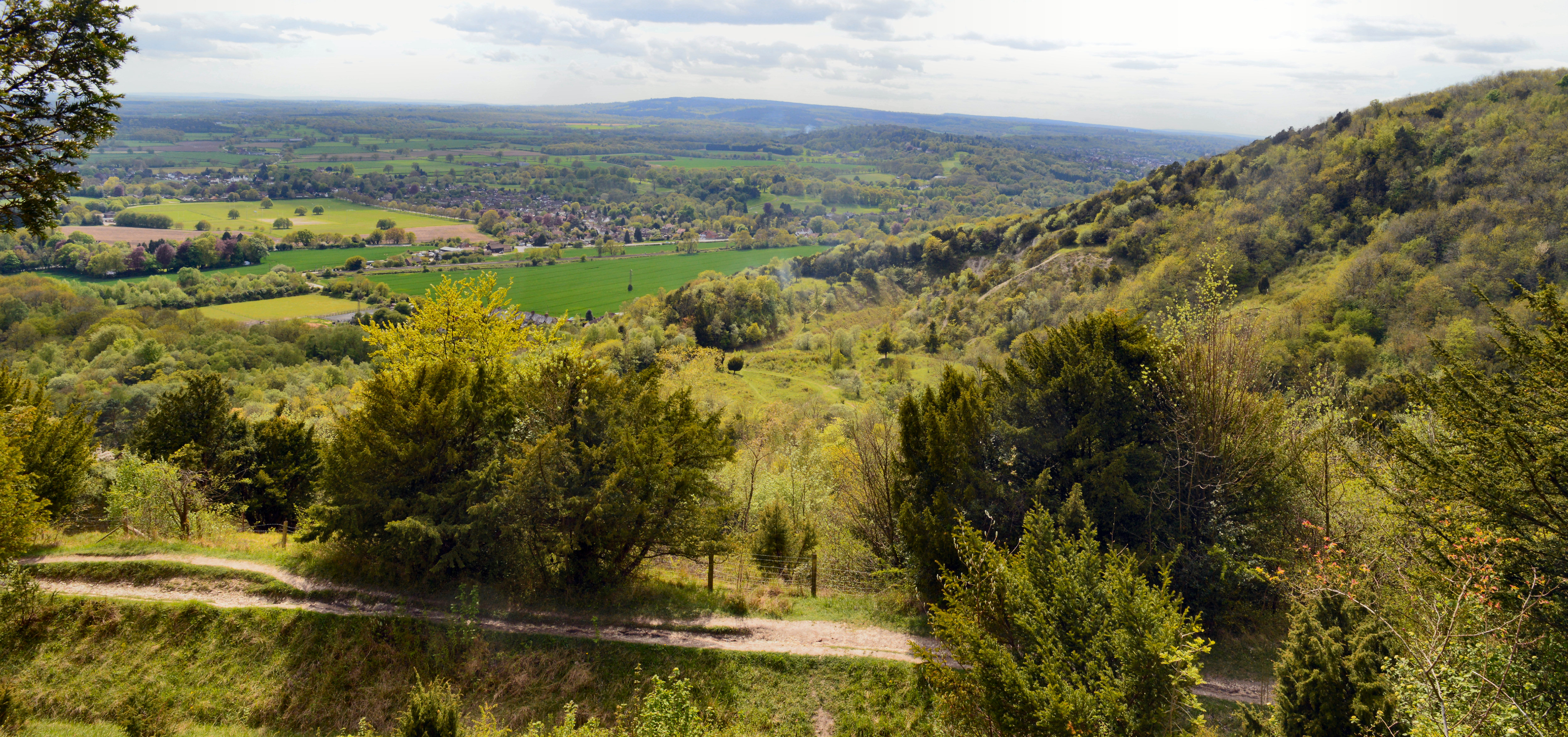
Brockham Limeworks

Surrey Wildlife Trust (SWT) was founded in 1959 as Surrey Naturalists' Trust and it is one of forty-six wildlife trusts covering Great Britain, Northern Ireland, Isle of Man and Alderney. SWT carries out conservation activities on a considerable area of Surrey County Council's large countryside estate and also manages land on behalf of the Ministry of Defence estate. As of 2022 the SWT manages more than 6,000 hectares (15,000 acres) of land for wildlife and employs more than 100 staff. It had an income of £5.1 million and expenditure of £5.7 million.

As of April 2022 the SWT manages sixty-eight nature reserves. (Note: Seventy-four reserves are listed below. Four sites are excluded because the SWT does not give a clear location and states that they are not open to the public. They are Pirbright Ranges, Seccombe's Wood, Wentworth and Whippets Cant.) Thirty-one are Sites of Special Scientific Interest, nine are Special Protection Areas, eight are Special Areas of Conservation, one is a national nature reserve, twelve are local nature reserves, four are Nature Conservation Review sites, two are Geological Conservation Reviews, five include scheduled monuments and two are listed on the Register of Historic Parks and Gardens of Special Historic Interest.

Surrey is a county in South East England. It has an area of 642 square miles (1,660 square kilometres) and an estimated population of 1.19 million as of 2017. It is bordered by Greater London, Kent, East Sussex, West Sussex, Hampshire and Berkshire. Its top level of government is provided by Surrey County Council and the lower level by eleven boroughs and districts, Elmbridge, Epsom and Ewell, Guildford, Mole Valley, Reigate and Banstead, Runnymede, Spelthorne, Surrey Heath, Tandridge, Waverley and Woking.

== Key ==
=== Public access ===
- FP = public access to footpaths through the site
- No = No public access
- PL = public access at limited times
- PP = public access to part of the site
- Yes = public access to the whole or most of the site

=== Classifications ===
- GCR = Geological Conservation Review
- LNR = Local nature reserve
- NCR = Nature Conservation Review
- NNR = National nature reserve
- RHPG = Register of Historic Parks and Gardens of Special Historic Interest
- SAC = Special Area of Conservation
- SM = Scheduled monument
- SPA = Special Protection Area under the European Union Directive on the Conservation of Wild Birds
- SSSI = Site of Special Scientific Interest

== Sites ==
Site	Photograph	Area (Note: Unless otherwise stated, the area and location are taken from the Wildlife Trust page for each site.)	Location	Public access	Classifications	Description
Ash Ranges	Ash Ranges	1,392 hectares (3,440 acres)	Pirbright; 51.268°N 0.660°W; SU936529	PL	SPA, SSSI	This large area of dry heath provides a habitat for many rare plants, invertebrates and reptiles. There are flora such as bell heather, early-purple orchid and the carnivorous round-leaved sundew, and heath tiger and green tiger beetles, while birds include nightjars, woodlarks and Dartford warblers.
Ashtead Park	Ashtead Park	24 hectares (59 acres)	Ashtead; 51.315°N 0.291°W; TQ192587	YES	LNR, RHPG	The nature reserve was formerly part of the park of Ashtead House. It is mainly woodland on heavy London Clay and it has two ponds. Fauna include the broad-bodied chaser and emperor dragonflies and common blue damselfly.
Barossa	Barossa	498 hectares (1,230 acres)	Camberley; 51.351°N 0.745°W; SU875621	YES	SPA, SSSI	This site is mainly heathland with areas of pine and deciduous woodland. Birds include nightjars, woodlarks and Dartford warblers. There are snakes such as adders and grass snakes, and lizards include slow worms and common lizards.
Bay Pond	Bay Pond	7 hectares (17 acres)	Godstone; 51.248°N 0.064°W; TQ352516	NO	SSSI	This is an educational reserve run by the Trust, with facilities such as an outdoor classroom. It has four ponds and the main one is believed to have been made in 1611 to hold back water for a mill. Other habitats are wildflower meadows and a mature alder swamp. Butterflies include gatekeeper, ringlet, small skipper and orange tip.
Betchworth Quarry and Lime Kilns	Betchworth Quarry	27 hectares (67 acres)	Betchworth; 51.247°N 0.285°W; TQ198511	YES	SAC, SSSI	This chalk downlands site is part of the North Downs and the Surrey Hills Area of Outstanding Natural Beauty. It has a rich variety of flowering plants, including orchids. The lime kilns house a variety of bat species, such as the whiskered, Natterer's, brown long-eared, Brandt's and Daubenton's.
Bisley and West End Commons and Reidon Hill	Bisley Common	46 hectares (110 acres)	Woking; 51.325°N 0.645°W; SU945593	YES	LNR, SAC, SPA, SSSI	This site has heath, grassland and woodland. There are mammals such as roe deer, and invertebrates include adders, grass snakes, slow-worms and common lizards.
Blindley Heath	Blindley Heath	26 hectares (64 acres)	Godstone; 51.186°N 0.045°W; TQ367448	YES	LNR, SSSI	This damp grassland site on Weald Clay has a rich flora. There are also a number of ponds and the Ray Brook runs through the heath. The grassland is dominated by tussock grass and there are scattered oaks, hawthorns, willows and blackthorns.
Brentmoor Heath and Folly Bog	Brentmoor Heath	59 hectares (150 acres)	Woking; 51.340°N 0.658°W; SU936610	YES	LNR, SAC, SPA, SSSI,	The nature reserve has heathland, woodland, acid grassland and ponds. There are grass snakes and adders and birds such as woodlarks, Dartford warblers, peregrine falcons and hobbies.
Broadstreet, Backside and Rydes Commons	Backside Common	158 hectares (390 acres)	Guildford; 51.247°N 0.622°W; SU963507	YES		These commons provide access to nature for people in the local area. The site has poor acidic grassland, oak and semi-mature birch woodland and ponds.
Brockham Limeworks	Brockham Limeworks	45 hectares (110 acres)	Brockham; 51.248°N 0.275°W; TQ205513	YES	SAC, SM, SSSI	This former chalk quarry ceased operation in 1936. It had two batteries of lime kilns, which have become roosting sites for bats. Some of the floor of the quarry has become species-rich chalk grassland, with plants such as broad-leaved helleborine and pyramidal, common spotted, fragrant and bee orchids.
Brookwood Lye	Brookwood Lye	22 hectares (54 acres)	Brookwood; 51.307°N 0.620°W; SU963573	NO		This is mainly wet grassland which has a rich variety of flora. Other habitats include alder carr and broadleaved woodland. There are many birds and invertebrates such as dragonflies.
Burner's Heath and Swallows Pond	Burner's Heath	5 hectares (12 acres)	Pirbright; 51.288°N 0.642°W; SU948552	YES		This site is mainly woodland. It is a conifer plantation with areas of broadleaf trees, heath and acid grassland.
Chinthurst Hill	Chinthurst Hill	17 hectares (42 acres)	Guildford; 51.202°N 0.550°W; TQ014458	YES	LNR, SM	The hill has woodland and dry acid grassland. There are woodland flowering plants such as wood anemone, yellow archangel, wood forget-me-not, red campion, common figwort, butcher’s broom and lady’s smock.
Chitty's Common	Chitty's Common	5 hectares (12 acres)	Guildford; 51.262°N 0.598°W; SU979524	YES		This urban common has wet and dry woodland, grassland, ponds and ditches. There are large amounts of dead wood which provide a habitat for invertebrates such as stag beetles. The grassland has many butterflies such as commas, red admirals and peacocks.
Chobham Common	Chobham Common	574 hectares (1,420 acres)	Chobham; 51.374°N 0.602°W; SU974648	YES	NCR, NNR, SAC, SM, SPA, SSSI	The common has a variety of habitats, such as wet and dry heathland, and its fauna and flora include many rare and scarce species, such as marsh clubmoss and marsh gentian. There are more than eighty birds species, including nationally important breeding populations of nightjars, woodlarks and Dartford warblers. The site is also very important for invertebrates, with sixty-four rare or scarce species, including the ant Formica rufibarbis, the robber fly Eutolmus rufibarbis and the silver-studded blue butterfly.
Colekitchen Down	Colekitchen Down	3 hectares (7.4 acres)	Gomshall; 51.228°N 0.448°W; TQ084488	NO		This sloping area of species-rich unimproved chalk grassland is surrounded by woodland and scrub. There is a variety of butterflies including chalkhill blue, small heath, adonis blue, gatekeeper, brimstone and marbled white.
Crooksbury Hill	Crooksbury Hill	17 hectares (42 acres)	Farnham; 51.206°N 0.745°W; SU878459	YES	SM	There are extensive views from the top of the hill over south-west Surrey and east Hampshire. The site has sandy soil with heath and woodland. It was formerly part of Crooksbury Common, and the trees were planted after the area was enclosed in 1848. Soldier's Ring on the north side of the hill is a scheduled monument: it is a hillfort dating to the late Bronze Age or early Iron Age.
Cucknell's Wood	Cucknell's Wood	11 hectares (27 acres)	Shamley Green; 51.177°N 0.512°W; TQ041430	YES		Birds in this 400 year old semi-natural wood include great spotted woodpecker, lesser spotted woodpecker, willow tit, treecreeper, nuthatch, goldcrest, green woodpecker and tawny owl. There are mammals such as dormice.
Dawcombe	Dawcombe	23 hectares (57 acres)	Reigate; 51.259°N 0.260°W; TQ215525	NO	SAC, SSSI	This site is mainly chalk grassland with large areas of hawthorn scrub and woodland. The grassland provides a habitat for many species of orchids, including pyramidal, fly, common spotted, man, greater butterfly, fragrant and bee.
Elstead Group of Commons	Elstead Common	180 hectares (440 acres)	Elstead; 51.172°N 0.677°W; SU926423	YES	SPA, SSSI	This site has heath, woodland and dry acid grassland, with scrub controlled by a herd of Belted Galloway cattle. It is important for saproxylic (dead wood eating) invertebrates, such as stag beetles. There are several ponds with a population of around a thousand toads.
Fames Rough	Fames Rough	23 hectares (57 acres)	Chipstead; 51.302°N 0.187°W; TQ265574	YES	SSSI	This site is notable for its wild flowers. Part of it is grassland which is periodically ploughed in order to provide a habitat for three very rare arable weeds, ground pine, cut-leaved germander and mat-grass fescue.
Farncombe Wood	Farncombe Wood	1 hectare (2.5 acres)	Godalming; 51.201°N 0.617°W; SU967455	YES		This steeply sloping wood was donated to the trust in 2003. It is mainly hazel coppice with oak standards. Ground flora include bluebells, wood anemone, yellow archangel and pignut.
Fir Tree Copse	Fir Tree Copse	6 hectares (15 acres)	Dunsfold; 51.105°N 0.540°W; TQ023350	YES	SSSI	This is oak and ash woodland, with hazel coppice. Pipistrelle bats have been recorded, together with birds such as the tawny owl and willow warbler. There are many species of fungi on rotting logs, and invertebrates include the nationally scarce common fan-foot moth.
The Forest and the Highlands	The Forest and the Highlands	27 hectares (67 acres)	East Horsley; 51.285°N 0.431°W; TQ095552	YES		Almost 180 plant species and more than 50 of birds have been recorded in this woodland site, including woodpeckers, Eurasian nuthatches, Eurasian treecreeper and tawny owls. There are amphibians such as common toads and great crested newts.
Fraser Down	Fraser Down	10 hectares (25 acres)	Dorking; 51.260°N 0.266°W; TQ211526	NO	SAC, SSSI	This is mainly chalk downland with some yew and beech woodland. The grassland has the rare silver-spotted skipper butterfly and wild flowers such as cowslip and wild marjoram.
Gracious Pond	Gracious Pond	14 hectares (35 acres)	Chobham; 51.365°N 0.584°W; SU987638	NO	SSSI	This site has heath, wet woodland and ponds. Fauna include common toad and raft spiders, which can run on water. There are heathland plants such as round-leaved sundew and trees include beeches.
Graeme Hendrey Wood	Graeme Hendrey Wood	10 hectares (25 acres)	Bletchingley; 51.234°N 0.073°W; TQ346501	YES		This former sand and gravel quarry is now a wood, with ash, oak, sycamore, sweet chestnut, hazel and silver birch. Ground flora include enchanter’s nightshade, bird's-nest orchid and dog’s mercury.
Hackhurst Downs	Hackhurst Downs	40 hectares (99 acres)	Guildford; 51.227°N 0.432°W; TQ096487	YES	LNR, SSSI	Much of this steeply sloping site is chalk grassland which is grazed by goats, and there are also areas of mature woodland and scrub. Flowering plants include wild marjoram, hedge bedstraw, vervain, harebell and mouse-ear hawkweed.
Hedgecourt	Hedgecourt	5 hectares (12 acres)	Felbridge; 51.145°N 0.070°W; TQ351402	YES	SSSI	This lakeside site has wet alder woodland, willow carr, damp oak woods and reedswamp. Twelve species of dragonfly have been recorded and breeding birds include water rails, mute swans, sedge warblers and tufted ducks.
Hill Park	Hill Park	24 hectares (59 acres)	Tatsfield; 51.284°N 0.039°W; TQ423559	YES	LNR	This site on the slope of the North Downs has flora-rich chalk grassland with fly, bee and pyramidal orchids. There is also woodland with ash, beech, yew and an avenue of horse chestnut.
Howell Hill	Howell Hill	5 hectares (12 acres)	Epsom; 51.342°N 0.224°W; TQ238618	YES		There are chalk spoil heaps on this calcareous grassland site. Around 260 species of flowering plants have been recorded, including mouse-eared hawkweed, kidney vetch, common spotted orchid, common knapweed, fragrant orchid and white helleborine orchid.
Kitchen Copse	Kitchen Copse	7 hectares (17 acres)	Bletchingley; 51.256°N 0.098°W; TQ328525	NO		This ancient semi-natural wood has diverse species of trees and ground flora. Flowering plants include dog's mercury, lesser celandine, yellow archangel, bluebell, enchanter's nightshade, primrose and common dog-violet.
Littlefield Common	Littlefield Common	17 hectares (42 acres)	Worplesdon; 51.264°N 0.625°W; SU960526	YES		The common has wet and dry woodland, heath, grassland and ponds, which have a variety of amphibians such as newts, toads and frogs. Flora include common yellow sedge and heath spotted-orchid.
Manor Farm	Manor Farm	25 hectares (62 acres)	Byfleet; 51.329°N 0.468°W; TQ068600	FP		This was part of a deer park in the seventeenth century and in the Second World War the wet meadows next to the River Wey were ploughed as part of the Dig for Victory campaign. The site was then a market garden until 2006. The Trust acquired it in 2009 and is restoring it to its natural state.
Middlebriars Wood	Middlebriars Wood	1 hectare (2.5 acres)	Shackleford; 51.203°N 0.637°W; SU953457	YES		This is a small mixed wood in a residential area of Hurtmore. The trust is working to improve its ecological value.
Milford Green and Coxhill Green	Milford Green and Coxhill Green	15 hectares (37 acres)	Chobham; 51.338°N 0.587°W; SU985608	YES		These greens have wet and dry woodland with several ponds. Milford Green is mainly oak with other trees such as silver birch, horse chestnut, sweet chestnut, beech and elm. Coxhill Green is broad-leaved woodland with an area of Scots pine.
Newdigate Brickworks	Newdigate Brickworks	24 hectares (59 acres)	Newdigate; 51.171°N 0.278°W; TQ205427	YES		The clay pits of this former brickworks are now lakes and ponds which provide habitats for great crested newts and dragonflies such as the broad-bodied chaser and emperor. Other habitats are woodland, scrub, grassland and marsh and 188 plant species have been recorded.
Norbury Park	Norbury Park	531 hectares (1,310 acres)	Dorking; 51.272°N 0.341°W; TQ158538	YES	RHPG, SAC, SSSI	The park was purchased by Surrey County Council to protect the land from being developed for housing and it is still managed for nature conservation. It has three farms, woodland, calcareous grassland and a stretch of the River Mole. Yew trees in Druid’s Grove are thought by SWT to be almost 3,000 years old.
Nower Wood	Nower Wood	33 hectares (82 acres)	Leatherhead; 51.278°N 0.290°W; TQ193546	NO		This is an educational reserve which hosts classrooms and children's events. It is mainly ancient oak woodland with areas of hazel coppice, chalk grassland, heath and artificial ponds which are used for pond dipping. There is a variety of birds such as woodcock and wood warbler.
Nutfield Marshes	Nutfield Marshes	62 hectares (150 acres)	Nutfield; 51.246°N 0.152°W; TQ291513	PP		These former sand quarries along the Redhill Brook are now wetland nature reserves called The Moors, Spynes Mere, and Holmethorpe Lagoons. They provide habitats for many birds, with 144 species recorded in Holmethorpe Lagoon. Spynes Mere has three lakes.
Papercourt Marshes	Papercourt Meadows	10 hectares (25 acres)	Send; 51.296°N 0.518°W; TQ034562	NO	SSSI	This wetland site has standing water scrapes, reed beds, marshes, wet woodland and grassy rides. More than a hundred species of bird have been recorded and the site also has a rich variety of aquatic plants and invertebrates.
Poors Allotment	Poors Allotment	76 hectares (190 acres)	Camberley; 51.360°N 0.726°W; SU888631	YES	SPA, SSSI	This site got its name because it was set aside under an early 19th century inclosure act to allow poor people to gather turf and bracken as fuel. It has heath, acid grassland and woods. Its importance lies in its fauna, such as woodlarks, nightjars, Dartford warblers, adders and several species of butterfly.
Priest Hill	Priest Hill	35 hectares (86 acres)	Epsom; 51.339°N 0.236°W; TQ230615	PP		More than 1,500 tons of tarmac and rubble were cleared from these former playing fields to create a grassland nature reserve. Three ponds have been created and cut grass and other plant matter from another reserve has been spread over some areas to introduce the seeds of wild flowers such as kidney vetch.
Pucks Oak Barn and McAlmont Reserves	McAlmont Reserve	4 hectares (9.9 acres)	Guildford; 51.213°N 0.633°W; SU956469	YES		This site is composed of four small woodland reserves, Farncombe Wood, Glebe Wood, Hayden's Copse and Pucks Oak Barn and Orchard. Ground flora include bluebells, wood anemone, ground elder and yellow archangel.
Quarry Hangers	Quarry Hangers	11 hectares (27 acres)	Caterham; 51.266°N 0.114°W; TQ317536	YES	SSSI	This chalk grassland site has very diverse flora and in some areas there are forty different species in a square metre, such as birdsfoot trefoil, salad burnet, wild strawberry, bee orchid, marjoram and wild thyme.
Rodborough Common	Rodborough Common	62 hectares (150 acres)	Milford; 51.165°N 0.666°W; SU934415	YES	LNR	Sheep and cattle were grazed on the common in the 19th century, and it was used for military exercises in the Second World War. It has heath, woodland and acid grassland. Flora include greater stitchwort, enchanter's nightshade and germander speedwell, and there are reptiles such as grass snakes, slowworms and common lizards.
Runfold Wood	Runfold Wood	12 hectares (30 acres)	Farnham; 51.214°N 0.757°W; SU869468	YES		This former beech plantation was badly damaged by the major storms of 1987 and 1990. It is now regenerating naturally as a mixed woodland. It has rare invertebrates, lichens and fungi together with birds such as blackcaps and nuthatches.
Seale Chalk Pit and Meadow	Seale Chalk Pit	3 hectares (7.4 acres)	Farnham; 51.225°N 0.714°W; SU 899 481	NO	GCR, SSSI	Part of this former quarry is a geological SSSI which exposes rocks of the Hog’s Back and exhibits the separation of the folding Mesozoic rocks of the Weald from the Tertiary sediments of the London Basin. The site has a variety of butterflies and more than 130 species of chalk grassland plants have been recorded.
Shabden Park	Shabden Park	103 hectares (250 acres)	Chipstead; 51.292°N 0.175°W; TQ274563	FP	SSSI	This is a working farm which has wildlfower meadows on chalk grassland together with areas of woodland. It has a nationally scarce species of mining bee and other fauna include Roesel's bush-cricket and a variety of birds and butterflies.
Sheepleas	Sheepleas	110 hectares (270 acres)	East Horsley; 51.252°N 0.440°W; TQ090515	YES	GCR, LNR, SSSI	This sloping site on the North Downs has woodland, scrub and botanically rich grassland. The diverse invertebrate fauna includes two nationally rare flies, Norellia spinipes and Microdon devius. A cutting in Mountain Wood exposes a unique gravel Pleistocene deposit which throws light on the Quaternary history of the Weald and the evolution of the London Basin.
Sheepwalk Lake	Sheepwalk Lake	9 hectares (22 acres)	Shepperton; 51.396°N 0.463°W; TQ070675	YES		This former gravel pit was allowed to flood, unlike many others in the area which were used for landfill sites. It is used by more than 100 species of resident and migratory birds, including, kingfishers, herons, tufted ducks, moorhens, coots, cormorants and great crested grebes.
Stringer's Common	Stringer's Common	30 hectares (74 acres)	Guildford; 51.268°N 0.582°W; SU990530	YES		This is one of eight commons in the parish of Worplesdon near Guildford. It was formerly used for grazing, but it is now mainly mixed woodland with some heath and grassland.
Thorpe Hay Meadow	Thorpe Hay Meadow	6 hectares (15 acres)	Egham; 51.420°N 0.520°W; TQ030700	YES	SSSI	This hay meadow in the flood plain on alluvial gravels of the River Thames has plants which thrive in lime-rich soil. It is surrounded by mature hedgerows and a drainage ditch has five species of willow, including purple willow and almond willow.
Thundry Meadows	Thundry Meadows	16 hectares (40 acres)	Elstead; 51.189°N 0.721°W; SU895441	YES	SSSI	This site on the north bank of the River Wey grassland has alder carr, wet and dry woodland, ditches and springs. The meadows are maintained by Belted Galloway cattle, providing suitable conditions for harvest mice. An unusual habitat is quaking mire, a mat of vegetation floating on liquid peat.
Underdown	Underdown	1 hectare (2.5 acres)	Farnham; 51.193°N 0.811°W; SU832444	YES		This reserve was donated to the Trust by Mrs Underdown in memory of her husband in 1987. It is a steeply sloping area of gorse and heather together with mixed woodland. There is a variety of invertebrates, including solitary wasps.
Vann Lake and Candy's Copse	Vann Lake and Candy's Copse	11 hectares (27 acres)	Ockley; 51.142°N 0.347°W; TQ157394	YES	SSSI	The lake is believed to date to the middle of the 18th century, when a stream was dammed to power a mill which was never built. It is surrounded by ancient wet and dry woodland on Weald clay. Over 900 species of fungi have been recorded, including six new to Britain, and one, Myarium crystallinum, never previously recorded. The stream has a nationally rare cranefly, Molophilus lackschewitzianus.
Wallis Wood	Wallis Wood	14 hectares (35 acres)	Dorking; 51.138°N 0.399°W; TQ121389	YES		A stream runs through this woodland reserve, which has an area of meadow pasture on its bank. Woodland flora include bluebells, broad-leaved helleborine orchids, violet helleborine orchids, common spotted orchids, primroses and wood anemone. There is a rare spider, Hyptiotes paradoxus, which lives in yew trees and is only found in one other site in the county.
Whitmoor and Rickford Commons	Whitmoor Common	183 hectares (450 acres)	Guildford; 51.266°N 0.594°W; SU982529	YES	LNR, SPA, SSSI	This site on the heath of the London Basin has a variety of heathland habitats, as well as areas of woodland, meadow and still and running water. The heath has a nationally scarce spider, Oxyopes heterophthalmus and beetle Hyperaspis pseudopustulata and there are nationally important populations of several bird species.
Wisley and Ockham Commons and Chatley Heath	Wisley and Ockham Commons	297 hectares (730 acres)	Wisley; 51.320°N 0.452°W; TQ080590	YES	LNR, SPA, SSSI	This site is mainly heathland but it also has areas of open water, bog, woodland and scrub. It has a rich flora and it is of national importance for true flies and for dragonflies and damselflies. Rare species include the white-faced darter dragonfly and the Thyridanthrax fenestratus bee fly.

== See also ==
- List of Sites of Special Scientific Interest in Surrey
- List of Local Nature Reserves in Surrey

== Sources ==
- Ratcliffe, Derek, ed. (1977). A Nature Conservation Review. Vol. 2. Cambridge, UK: Cambridge University Press. ISBN 0-521-21403-3.
