= Fames Rough =

Nature reserve in Surrey, England

Coordinates: 51.302°N 0.187°W

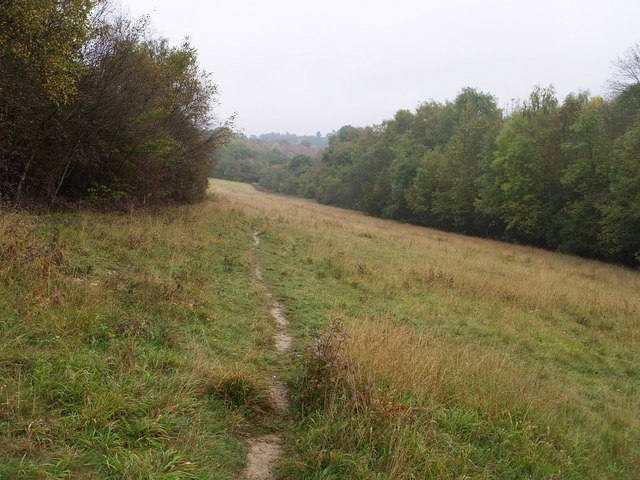
- Interactive map of Fames Rough
- Type: Nature reserve
- Location: Chipstead, Surrey
- OS grid: TQ265574
- Area: 23 hectares (57 acres)
- Manager: Surrey Wildlife Trust

Fames Rough is a 23-hectare (57-acre) nature reserve south-west of Chipstead in Surrey. It is managed by the Surrey Wildlife Trust and is part of the Chipstead Downs Site of Special Scientific Interest.

This site is notable for its wild flowers. Part of it is grassland which is periodically ploughed in order to provide a habitat for three very rare arable weeds, ground pine, cut-leaved germander and mat-grass fescue.
