= Hardivillers-Breteuil narrow gauge railway =

Industrial railway in France

Coordinates: 49.62174869265985°N 2.2503573818035494°E

Hardivillers–Breteuil
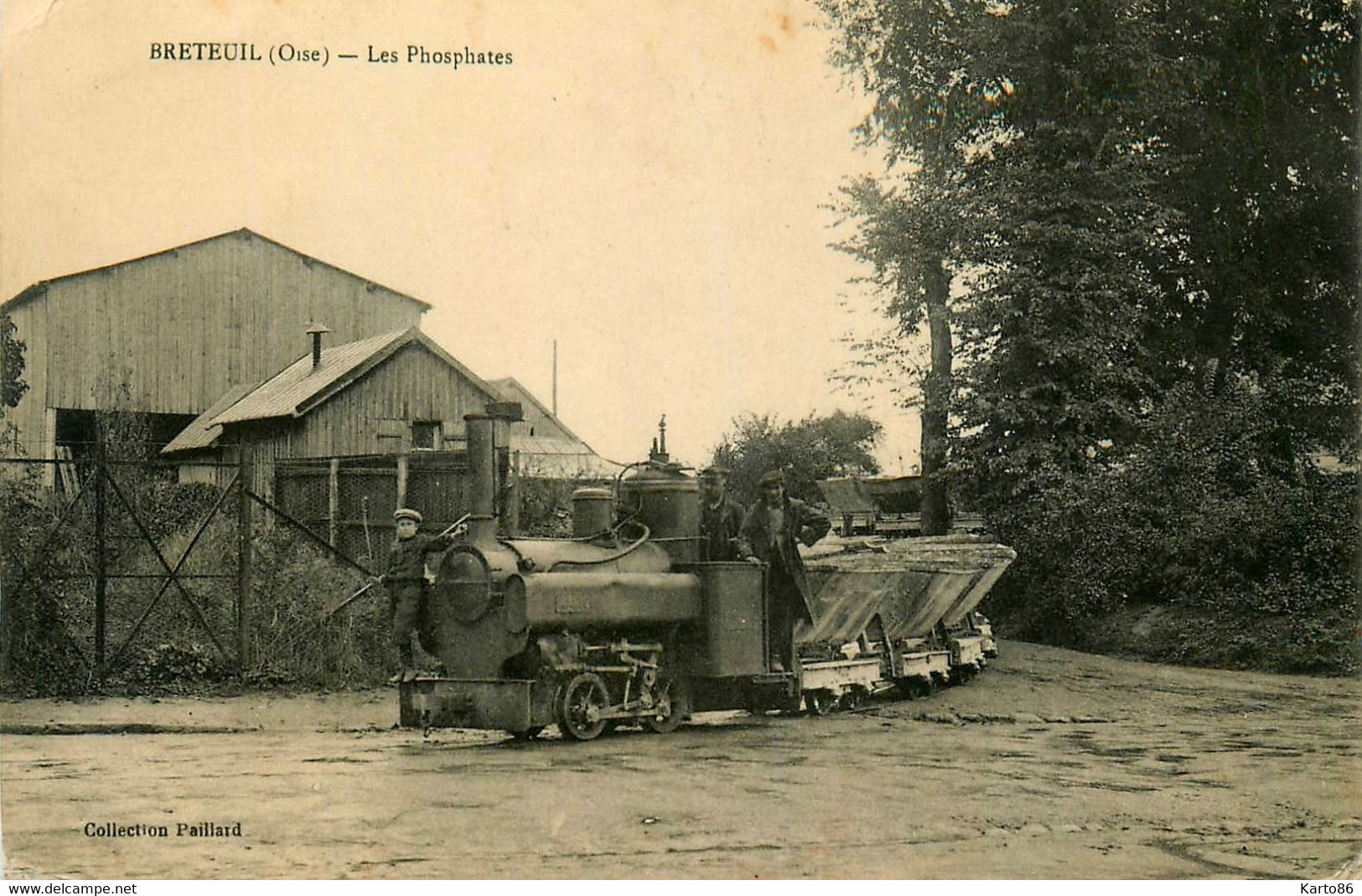
- Corpet locomotive N°356/1882 with a Brown valve gear

Technical
- Line length: 4 kilometres (2.5 mi)
- Track gauge: 600 mm (1 ft 11 5/8 in)

The Hardivillers-Breteuil narrow gauge railway was a 600 mm (1 ft 11 5/8 in) gauge industrial railway, approximately 4 kilometres (2.5 mi) long, in the north of France. It ran from the phosphate quarries and factory at Hardivillers along the Rue de Creveceur (D 930) to a loading ramp called Quai des Phosphates at the railway station in Breteuil.

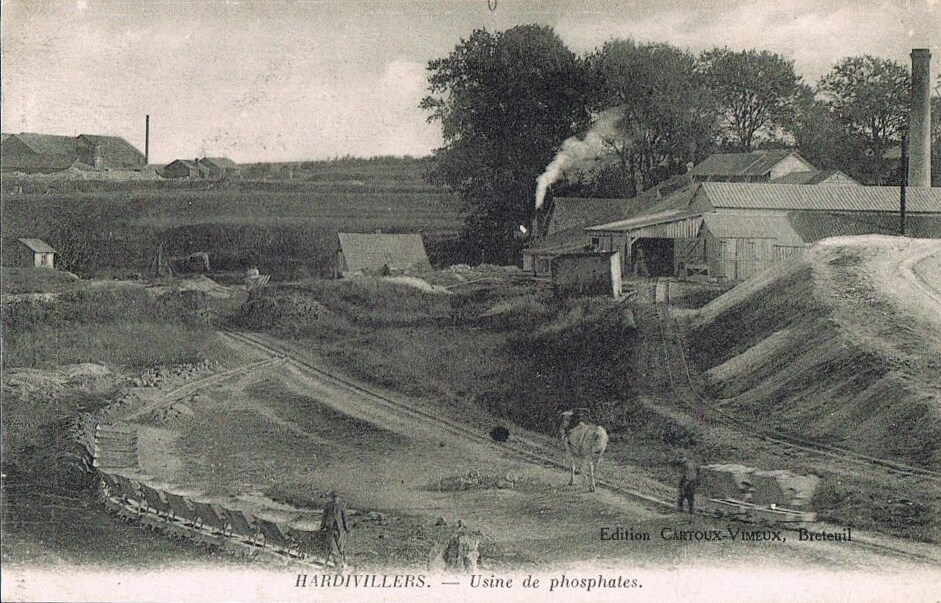
Horse-drawn trains in the quarry

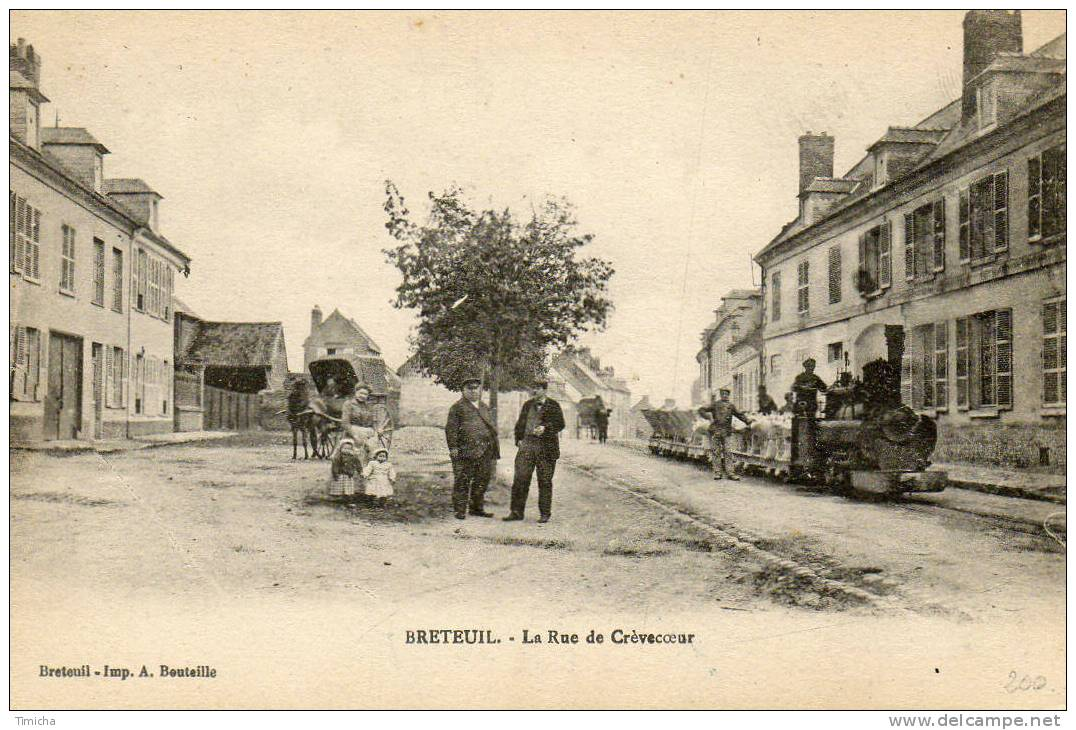
Rue de Creveceur

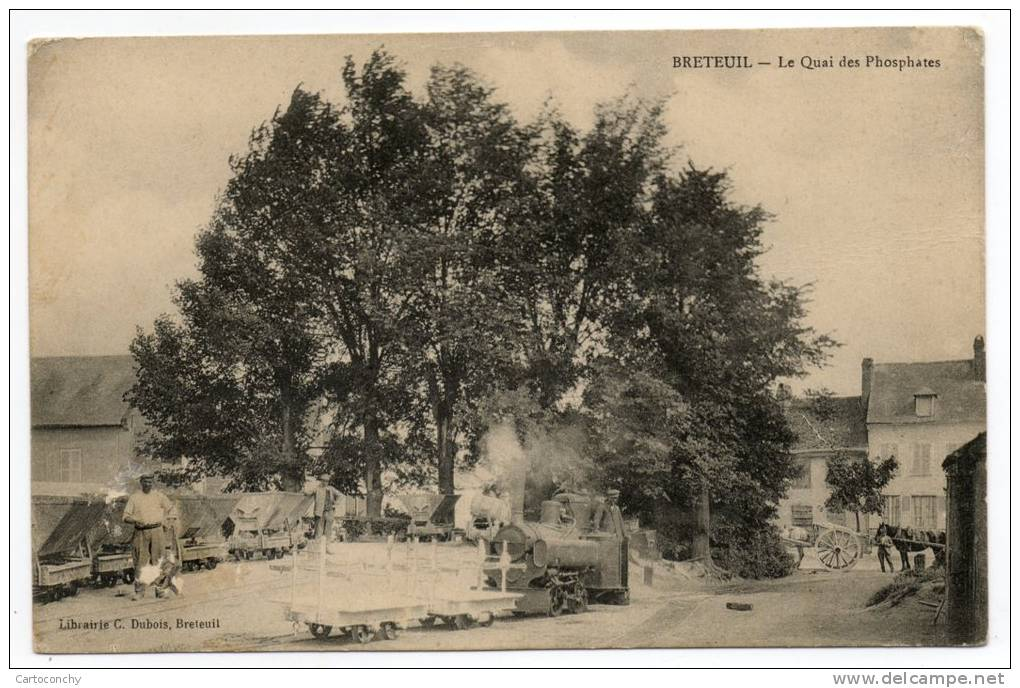
Quai des Phosphates

== Railway operation ==
In the quarries, horses were mainly used to haul the V-skip trucks for transporting the extracted minerals to the ore washing plant and phosphate factory. The four wheel Corpet steam locomotive N°356/1882 was used, among others, on the approximately 4 km long, mostly straight line to the station. It has been delivered to its first owner M. d'Angicourt on 25 November 1881 under the name Secondat and came to the Établissements P. LINET in Breteuil in 1927. There was also the Corpet-Louvet steam locomotive N° 956/1903, delivered on 12 June 1903 under the name of Mireille to the entrepreneur Gardet in Brest, which also came to the Établissements P. LINET in 1927.

== Quarries ==
There were several quarries in the area between Hardivillers and Breteuil. Phosphate mining was carried out from about 1887 to 1972 in open pits and deep mine tunnels, in the chalk fields of the Plateau Picard. Since the closure, pioneer vegetation has been able to develop there and recolonise the spoil heaps. Since the pioneer phase, the scree slopes and chalk cliffs have been overgrown with hawkweed oxtongue and carline thistle, and cutleaf chamomander and lesser butter and eggs (linaria supina) grow on the chalk scree slopes. In older, replanted areas, mahaleb cherry, golden rain and viburnum bushes grow. A beech forest with bluebells eventually develops on the loamy plateaus.

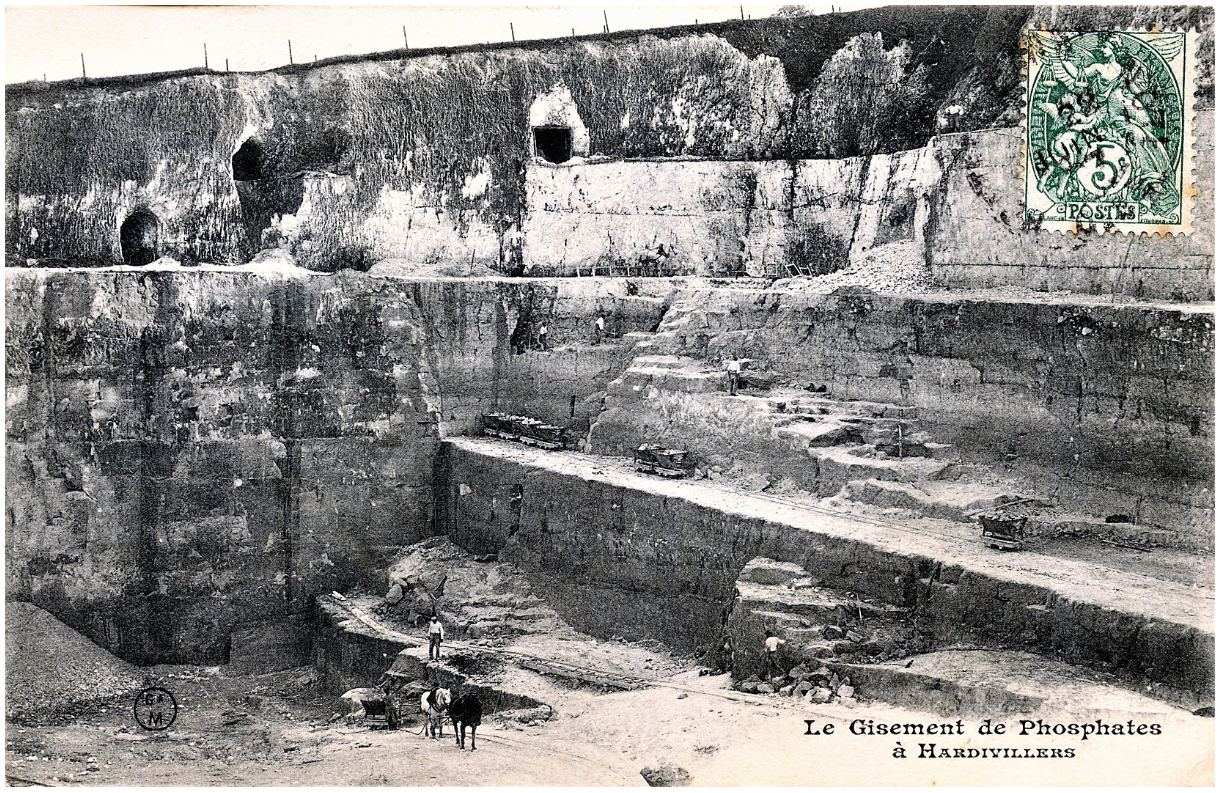
Open pit and deep mines, ca 1907

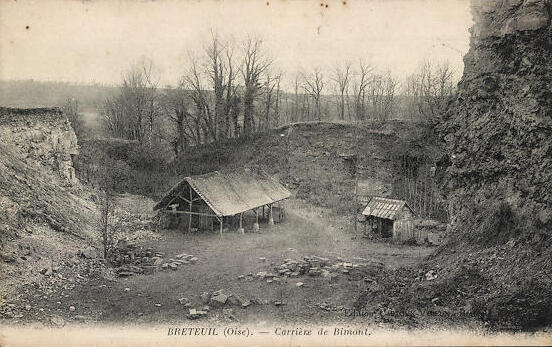
Carrière de Bimont, ca 1916

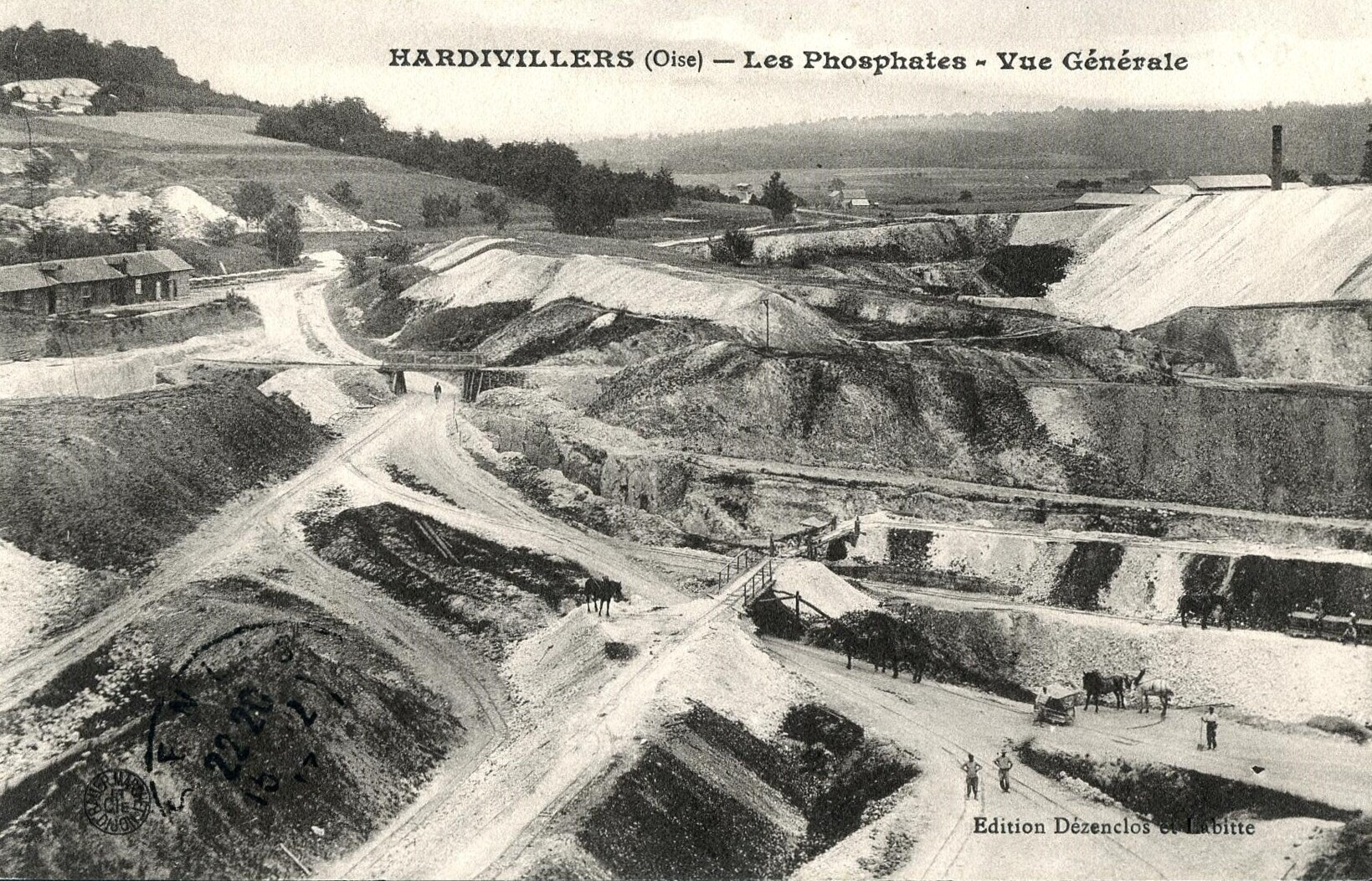
The quarry from above

== Phosphate factory ==
The Société des Établissements P. LINET operated a phosphate factory in Hardivillers. It advertised that the organic nitrogen in P. LINET's compound fertilisers was particularly well absorbed by the plants, pointing out that incorrectly mixed fertilisers led to irregular results. Thanks to the production methods used in Hardivillers, there had been nothing of the sort with P. LINET's compound fertilisers. According to the company, phosphates for agriculture (phosphate chalk from the department of Oise) had the same fertilising effect as phosphates from the department of Somme.

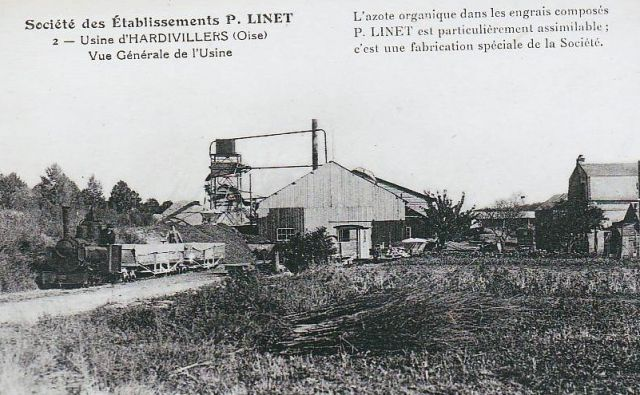
Société des Établissements P. LINET

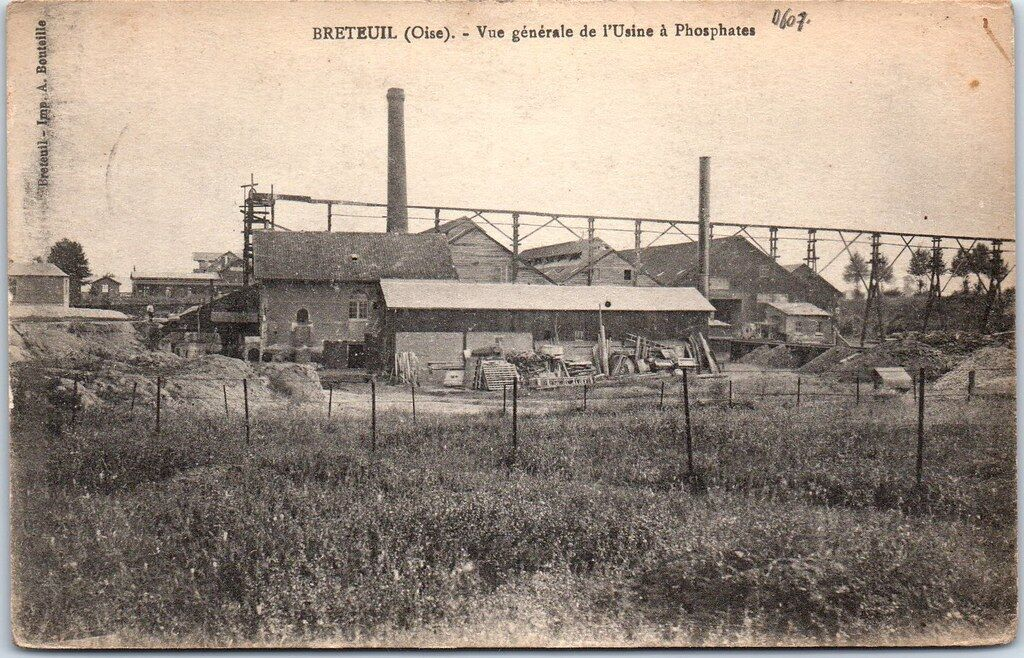
Factory building

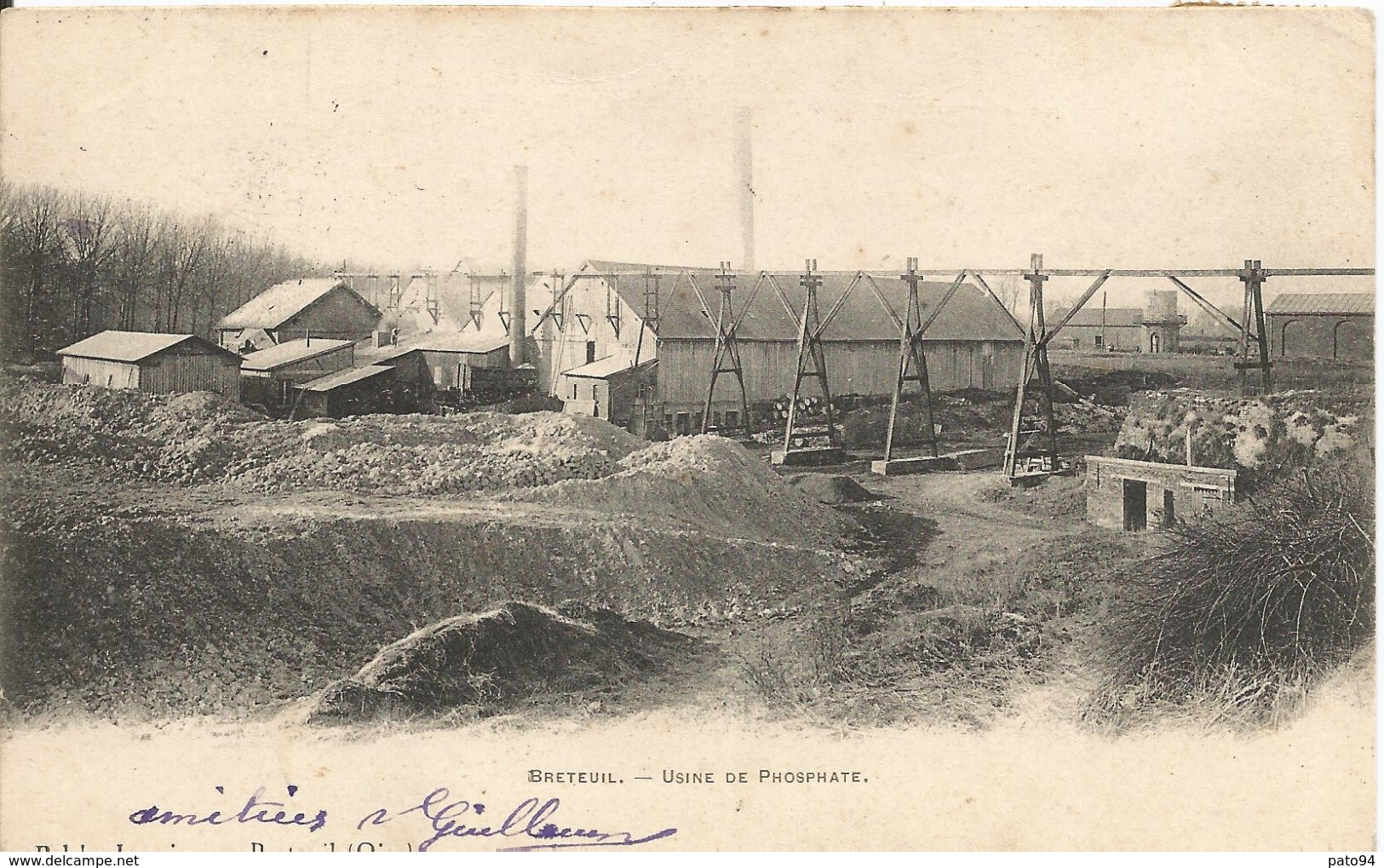
Water supply

== Onward transport ==
For marketing, the phosphates were loaded on the Quai des Phosphates near the railway station onto standard-gauge goods trains.

== Geology ==
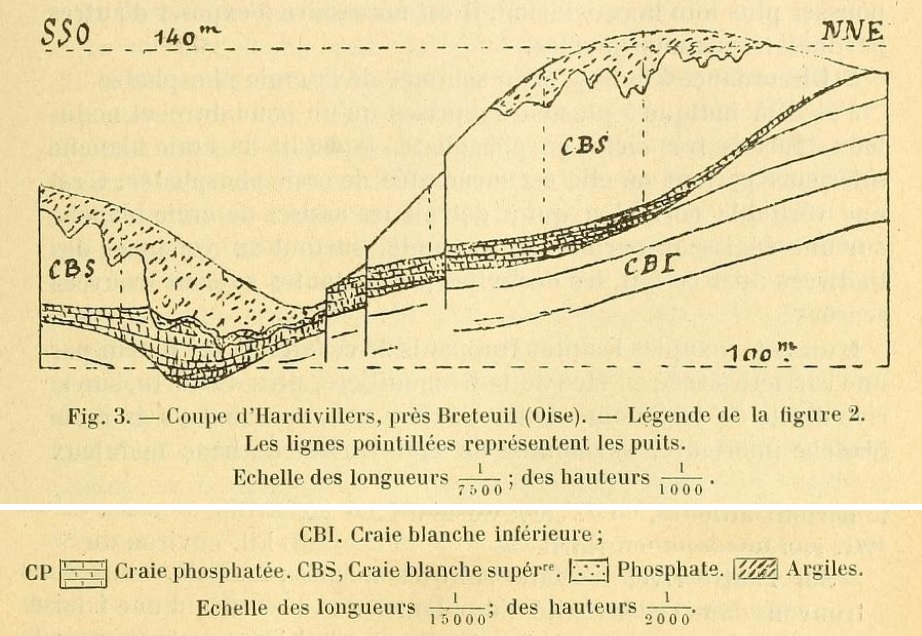
Geological section through Hardivillers, near Breteuil (Oise). The dashed lines represent the shafts. CBI = Lower white chalk; CP (horizontal/vertical hatching) = Phosphatic chalk; CBS = Upper white chalk; Dotted = Phosphate; Oblique hatching = Clay minerals (Alumina)

Around 1892, it was scientifically proven that the phosphate chalk of Hardivillers is on a geologically higher level than that of Doullens, because the fossils found in it are different.
