= Alvescot Meadows =

UK Site of Special Scientific Interest

Coordinates: 51.7435°N 1.6055°W

- Site of Special Scientific Interest
- Location of Alvescot Meadows.
- Area of search: Oxfordshire
- Grid reference: SP 273 050
- Interest: Biological
- Area: 2.9691 hectares (7.337 acres)
- Notification date: March 18, 1992; 34 years ago
- Location map: Magic Map

Alvescot Meadows is a Site of Special Scientific Interest just under 3 hectares (7.4 acres) in size near Alvescot in Oxfordshire.

== Description ==
The site consists of two hay meadows next to the Shill Brook, just north of Alvescot village and adjoining RAF Brize Norton to the north. The larger meadow is very wet.

== Natural history ==
The meadows are rich in sedges, such as star sedge and common yellow-sedge, wildflowers including common milkwort, marsh orchids, devil's-bit scabious, green-winged orchids, cowslips, and pepper saxifrage, and other plants such as adder's-tongue ferns. Marsh valerian, marsh marigolds, and ragged robin are found in the wettest areas.

== History ==
Neither meadow has undergone any agricultural improvement such as ploughing, reseeding, or treatment with herbicides. The site was declared a Site of Special Scientific Interest on 18 March 1992.
