= Chitty's Common =

Nature reserve in England

Coordinates: 51.262°N 0.598°W

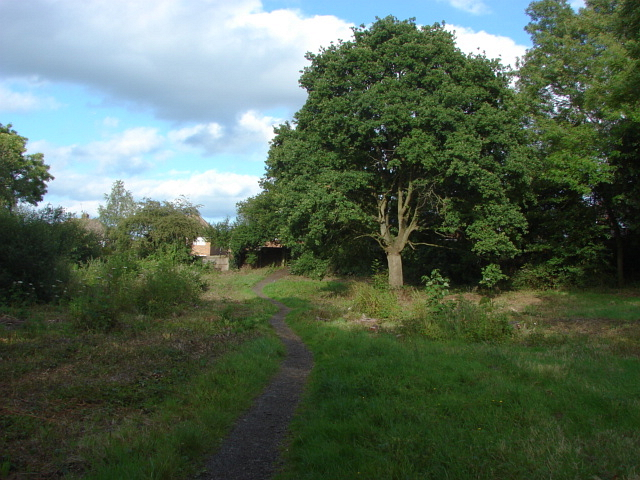
- Interactive map of Chitty's Common
- Type: Nature reserve
- Location: Guildford, Surrey
- OS grid: SU 979 524
- Area: 5 hectares (12 acres)
- Manager: Surrey Wildlife Trust

Chitty's Common is a 5-hectare (12-acre) nature reserve in Guildford in Surrey. It is owned by Surrey County Council and managed by the Surrey Wildlife Trust.

This urban common has wet and dry woodland, grassland, ponds and ditches. There are large amounts of dead wood which provide a habitat for invertebrates such as stag beetles. The grassland has many butterflies such as commas, red admirals and peacocks.

There is access from Keens Lane and Rydes Hill Road.

Other nearby commons include; Whitmoor Common, Littlefield Common and Broadstreet Common.
