= White Downs =

White Downs may refer to:

- Hackhurst and White Downs, a nature reserve in Surrey, England
- White Downs, an area in The Shire in J. R. R. Tolkien's fictional Middle-earth
