= Burner's Heath and Swallows Pond =

Nature reserve in Surrey, England

Coordinates: 51.288°N 0.642°W

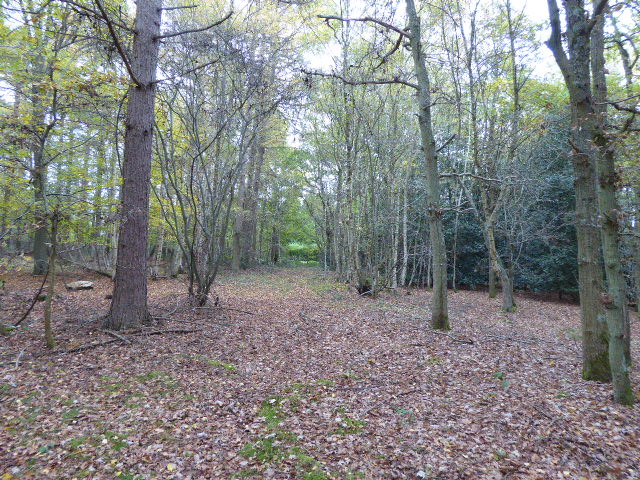
- Interactive map of Burner's Heath and Swallows Pond
- Type: Nature reserve
- Location: Pirbright, Surrey
- OS grid: SU948552
- Area: 5 hectares (12 acres)
- Manager: Surrey Wildlife Trust

Burner's Heath and Swallows Pond is a 5-hectare (12-acre) nature reserve in Pirbright in Surrey. It is owned by Surrey County Council and managed by the Surrey Wildlife Trust.

This site is mainly woodland. It is a conifer plantation with areas of broadleaf trees, heath and acid grassland.

There is access from the A324 and B3032 roads.
