= Thundry Meadows =

Nature reserve in Surrey

Coordinates: 51.189°N 0.721°W

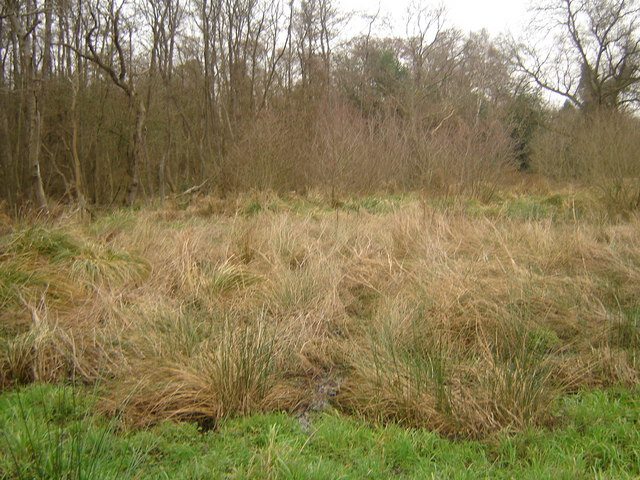
- Interactive map of Thundry Meadows
- Type: Nature reserve
- Location: Elstead, Surrey
- OS grid: SU895441
- Area: 16 hectares (40 acres)
- Manager: Surrey Wildlife Trust

Thundry Meadows is a 16-hectare (40-acre) nature reserve in Elstead in Surrey. It is managed by the Surrey Wildlife Trust. Part of it is Charleshill Site of Special Scientific Interest.

This site on the north bank of the River Wey grassland alder carr, wet and dry woodland, ditches and springs. The meadows are maintained by Belted Galloway cattle, providing suitable conditions for harvest mice. An unusual habitat is quaking mire, a mat of vegetation floating on liquid peat.

There is access from Farnham Road.
