= Broadstreet, Backside and Rydes Commons =

Nature reserve in Surrey, England

Coordinates: 51.247°N 0.622°W

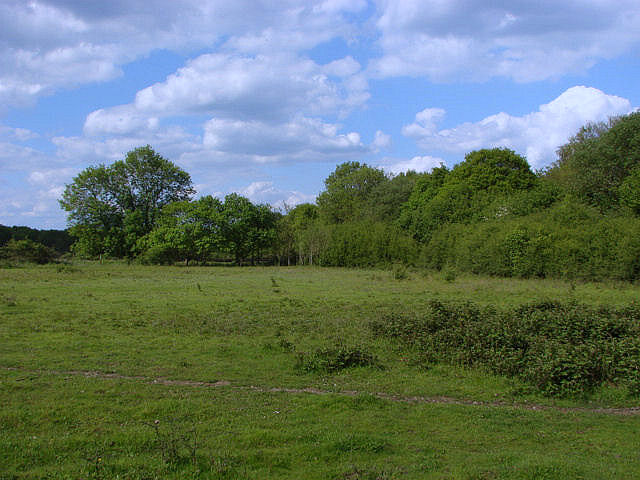
- Backside Common
- Interactive map of Broadstreet, Backside and Rydes Commons
- Type: Nature reserve
- Location: Wood Street Village, Surrey
- OS grid: SU 963 507
- Area: 158 hectares (390 acres)
- Manager: Surrey Wildlife Trust

Broadstreet, Backside and Rydes Commons is a 158-hectare (390-acre) nature reserve in Wood Street Village in Surrey. It is owned by Surrey County Council and managed by the Surrey Wildlife Trust.

These commons provide access to nature for people in the local area. The site has poor acidic grassland, oak and semi-mature birch woodland and ponds.
