= Underdown nature reserve =

Nature reserve in Surrey, England

Coordinates: 51.193°N 0.811°W

Underdown
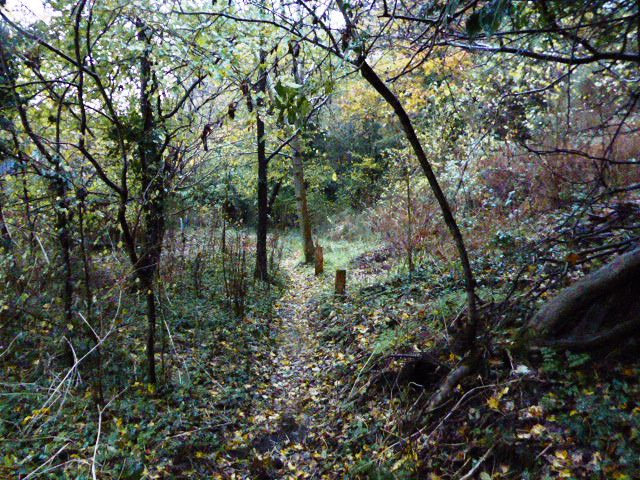
- Interactive map of Underdown
- Type: Nature reserve
- Location: Farnham, Surrey
- OS grid: SU 832 444
- Area: 1 hectare (2.5 acres)
- Manager: Surrey Wildlife Trust

Underdown is a 1-hectare (2.5-acre) nature reserve in Farnham in Surrey. It is owned and managed by the Surrey Wildlife Trust.

This reserve was donated to the Trust by Mrs Underdown in memory of her husband in 1987. It is a steeply sloping area of gorse and heather together with mixed woodland. There is a variety of invertebrates, including solitary wasps.

There is access by a footpath from Sandrock Hill Road.
