= Papercourt Marshes =

Nature reserve in Surrey, England

Coordinates: 51.299°N 0.515°W

Papercourt
- Site of Special Scientific Interest
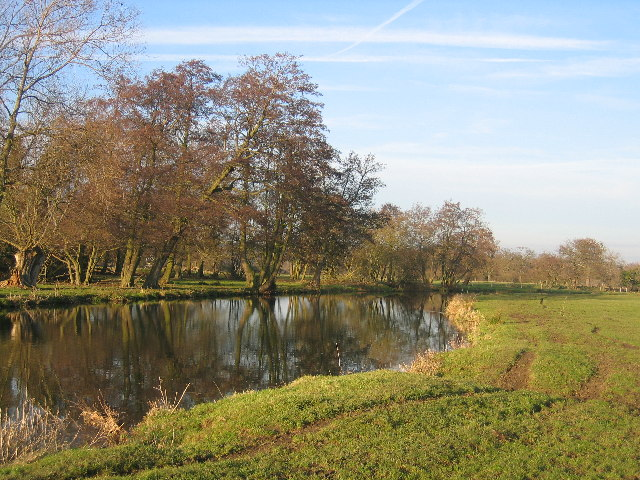
- Location of Papercourt.
- Area of search: Surrey
- Grid reference: TQ 036 566
- Interest: Biological
- Area: 70.0 hectares (173 acres)
- Notification date: 1986
- Location map: Magic Map

Papercourt Marshes is a 10-hectare (25-acre) nature reserve in the borough of Guildford in Surrey. It is managed by the Surrey Wildlife Trust. A roughly 50 hectares (120 acres) lake and associated surrounds, including the marshes totalling 20.0 hectares (49 acres) is designated a biological Site of Special Scientific Interest as Papercourt.

This site has a variety of wetland habitats with marshes, unimproved meadows, streams and flooded gravel pits. More than seventy species of birds breed on Papercourt and ninety species winter there.

The stream, and banks are rich in flora such as greater sweet-grass, reed canary grass and red pondweed.

Access is limited to Papercourt Sailing Club, chosen ecologists and ornithologists.
