= Newdigate Brickworks =

Nature reserve

Coordinates: 51.171°N 0.278°W

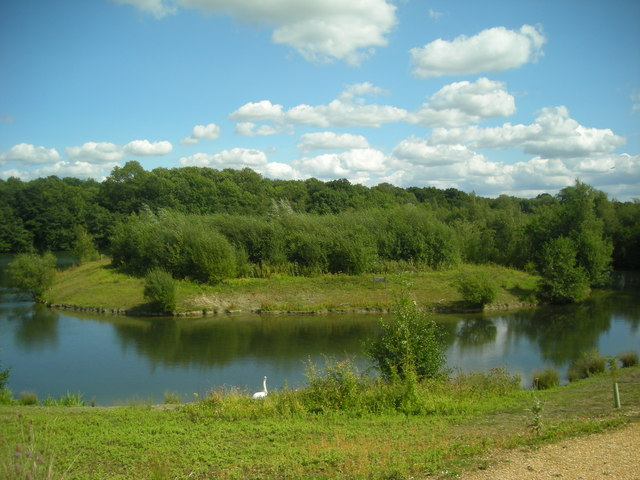
- Interactive map of Newdigate Brickworks
- Type: Nature reserve
- Location: Newdigate, Surrey
- OS grid: TQ 205 427
- Area: 24 hectares (59 acres)
- Manager: Surrey Wildlife Trust

Newdigate Brickworks is a 24-hectare (59-acre) nature reserve in Newdigate in Surrey, England. It is managed by the Surrey Wildlife Trust.

The clay pits of this former brickworks are now lakes and ponds which provide habitats for great crested newts and dragonflies such as the broad-bodied chaser and emperor. Other habitats are woodland, scrub, grassland and marsh and 188 plant species have been recorded.

There is access from Hoggspudding Lane.
