= Middlebriars Wood =

Nature reserve in Surrey, England

Coordinates: 51.203°N 0.637°W

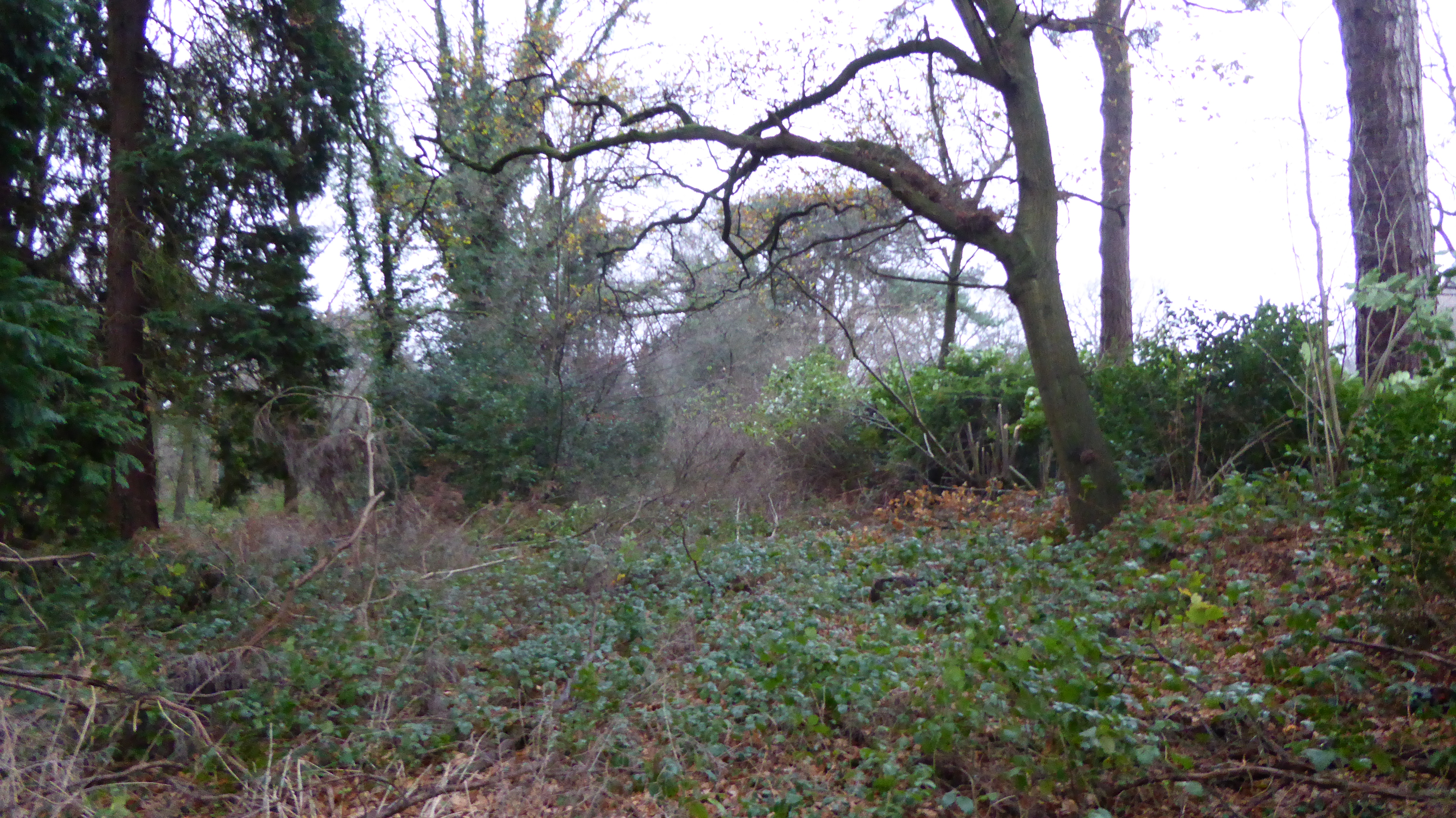
- Interactive map of Middlebriars Wood
- Type: Nature reserve
- Location: Hurtmore, Surrey
- OS grid: SU 953 457
- Area: 1 hectare (2.5 acres)
- Manager: Surrey Wildlife Trust

Middlebriars Wood is a 1-hectare (2.5-acre) nature reserve in Hurtmore, west of Farncombe in Surrey. It is managed by the Surrey Wildlife Trust.

This is a small mixed wood in a residential area of Hurtmore. The trust is working to improve its ecological value.

There is access from Priorsfield Road.
