= Kitchen Copse =

Nature reserve in Surrey, England

Coordinates: 51.256°N 0.098°W

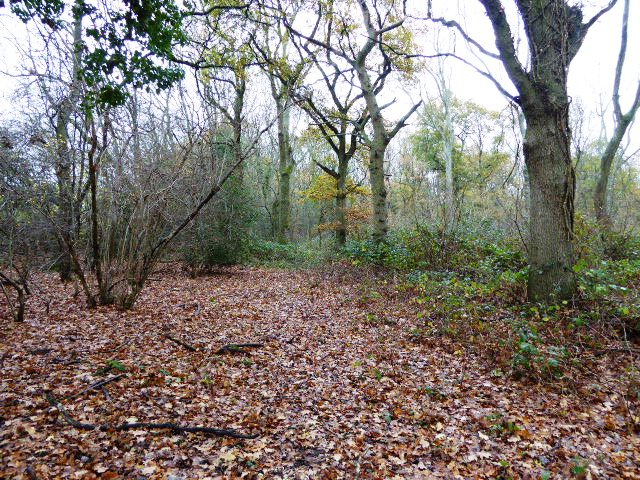
- Interactive map of Kitchen Copse
- Type: Nature reserve
- Location: Bletchingley, Surrey
- OS grid: TQ 328 525
- Area: 7 hectares (17 acres)
- Manager: Surrey Wildlife Trust

Kitchen Copse is a 7-hectare (17-acre) nature reserve north of Bletchingley in Surrey. It is managed by the Surrey Wildlife Trust.

This ancient semi-natural wood has diverse species of trees and ground flora. Flowering plants include dog's mercury, lesser celandine, yellow archangel, bluebell, enchanter's nightshade, primrose and common dog-violet.

There is no public access to the site.
