= Blindley Heath SSSI =

UK Site of Specific Scientific Interest

Coordinates: 51.186°N 0.046°W

Blindley Heath
- Site of Special Scientific Interest
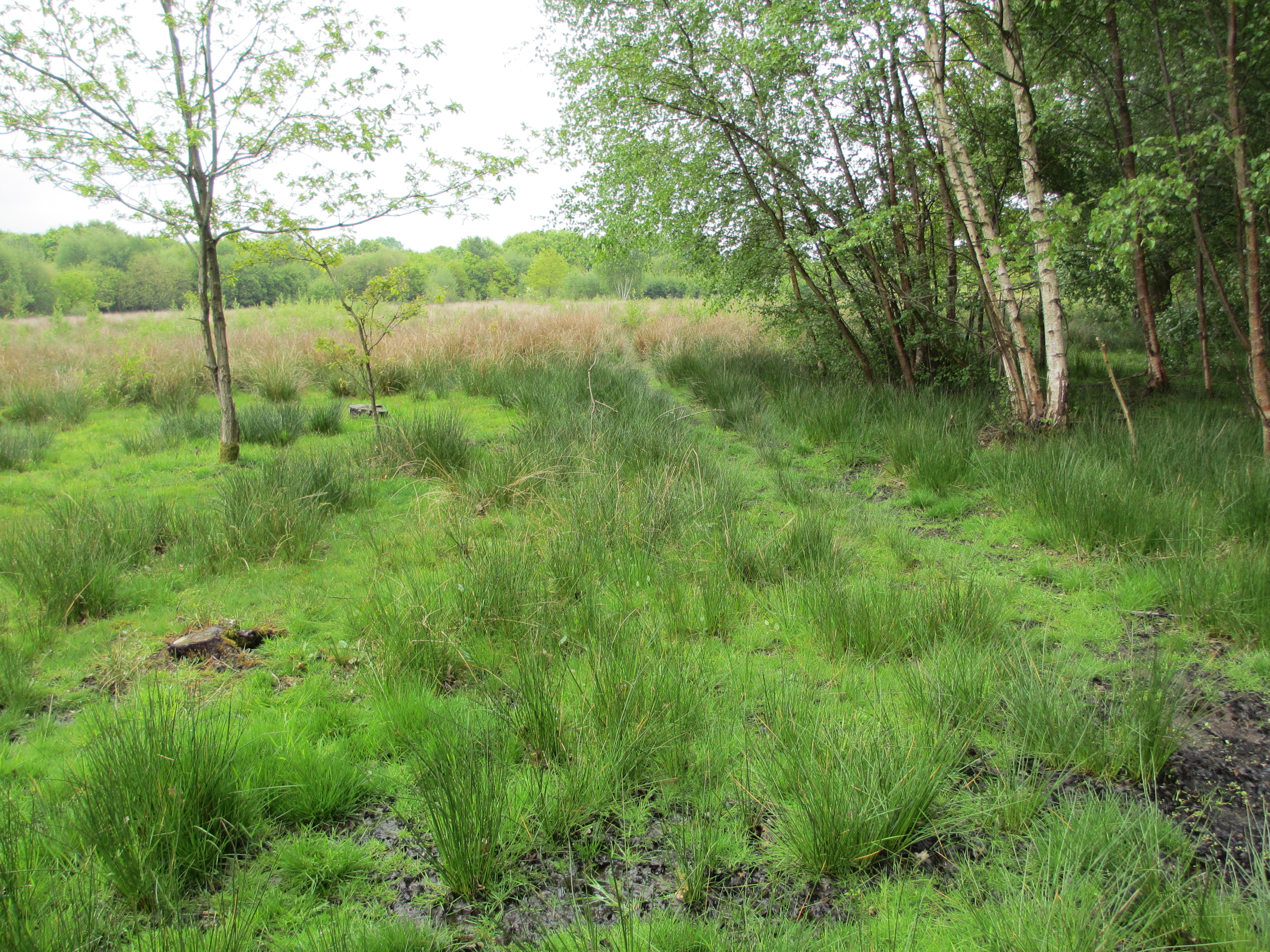
- Location of Blindley Heath.
- Area of search: Surrey
- Grid reference: TQ 367 448
- Interest: Biological
- Area: 26.3 hectares (65 acres)
- Notification date: 1984
- Location map: Magic Map

Blindley Heath SSSI is a 26.3-hectare (65-acre) biological Site of Special Scientific Interest in the hamlet Blindley Heath, on the southern outskirts of Godstone in Surrey. It is also a Local Nature Reserve. It is owned by Godstone Parish Council and managed by the Surrey Wildlife Trust

This damp grassland site on Weald Clay has a rich flora. There are also a number of ponds and a stretch of the Ray Brook runs through the heath. The grassland is dominated by tussock grass and there are scattered oaks, hawthorns, willows and blackthorns.

There is access from Ray Lane.
