= The Forest and the Highlands =

Nature reserve in Surrey, England

Coordinates: 51.285°N 0.431°W

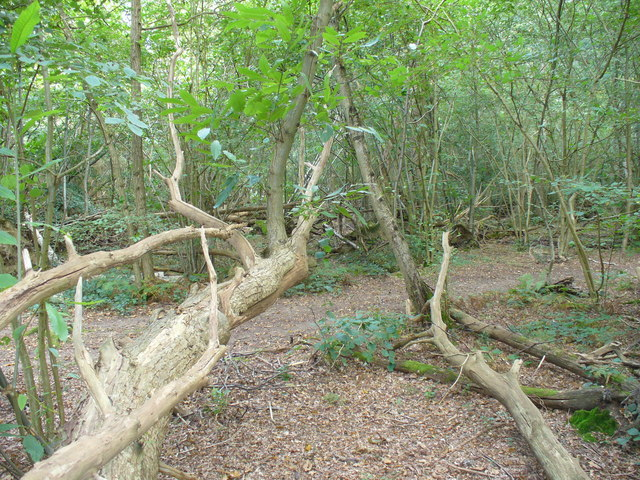
- Interactive map of The Forest and the Highlands
- Type: Nature reserve
- Location: East Horsley, Surrey
- OS grid: TQ 095 552
- Area: 29.74 hectares (73.5 acres)
- Manager: Surrey Wildlife Trust

The Forest and the Highlands is a 29.74-hectare (73.5-acre) nature reserve north of East Horsley in Surrey. It is owned by East Horsley Parish Council and managed by the Surrey Wildlife Trust.

Almost 180 plant species and more than 50 of birds have been recorded in this woodland site, including woodpeckers, nuthatches, treecreeper and tawny owls. There are amphibians such as common toads and great crested newts.

There is access from The Drift.
