= Manor Farm, Surrey =

Nature reserve in Surrey, England

Coordinates: 51.329°N 0.468°W

Manor Farm
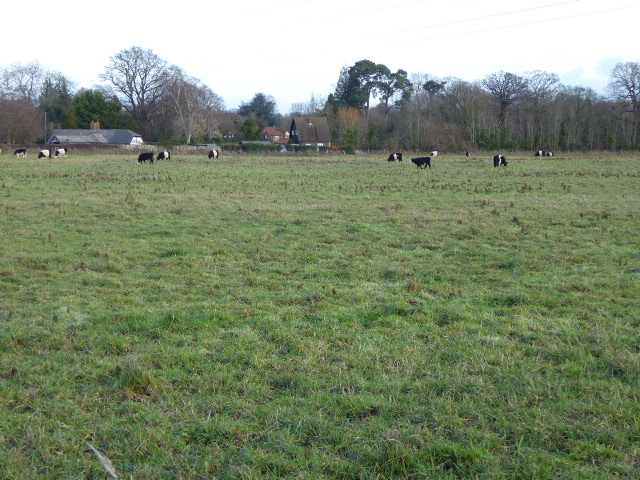
- Interactive map of Manor Farm
- Type: Nature reserve
- Location: Byfleet, Surrey
- OS grid: TQ068600
- Area: 25 hectares (62 acres)
- Manager: Surrey Wildlife Trust

Manor Farm is a 25-hectare (62-acre) nature reserve in Byfleet, Surrey. It is owned and managed by the Surrey Wildlife Trust.

In the seventeenth century, the area was part of a deer park and in the Second World War the wet meadows next to the River Wey were ploughed as part of the Dig for Victory campaign. The site was then a market garden until 2006.

The Trust acquired Manor Farm in 2009 and introduced cattle to graze the land to increase biodiversity in the same year. It was officially opened on 29 May 2010 and the Woking News and Mail reported the same month that skylarks, pied wagtails, linnets and roe deer were already visiting the site. An artificial otter holt was constructed by the Wey in the first year of the trust's ownership. Among the species recorded in a 2011 survey of the wet meadows next to the river were: the nationally scarce dotted fan-foot moth (thought to have been absent from Surrey for the previous 14 years); Baryphyma pratense (a money spider not previously recorded in the county); a species of rove beetle.

At the end of 2010, the trust was awarded £20k in grants by Biffaward and the Veolia Environmental Trust to create new hedgerows and construct a new bird hide. A £1M conservation project, funded by Shepperton Studios began in February 2023. The 30-year scheme will provide a habitat for plant species that thrive in low-nutrient soils, including orchids and other wildflowers.

There is access to footpaths only apart from a dog exercise area.
