= Runfold Wood =

Nature reserve in Surrey, England

Coordinates: 51.214°N 0.757°W

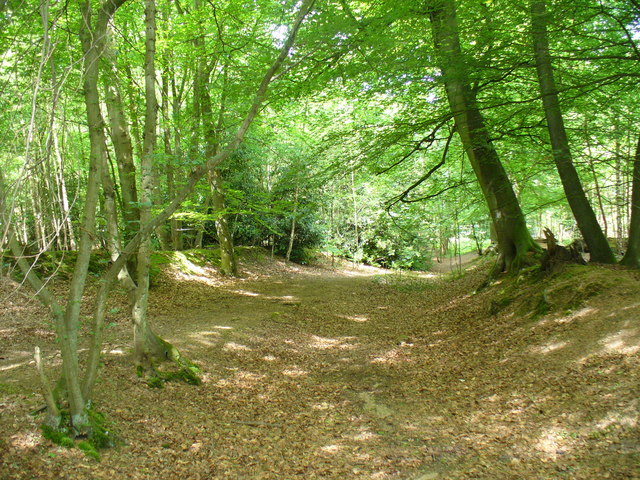
- Interactive map of Runfold Wood
- Type: Nature reserve
- Location: Farnham, Surrey
- OS grid: SU 869 468
- Area: 12 hectares (30 acres)
- Manager: Surrey Wildlife Trust

Runfold Wood is a 12-hectare (30-acre) nature reserve east of Farnham in Surrey. It is managed by the Surrey Wildlife Trust.

This former beech plantation was badly damaged by the major storms of 1987 and 1990. It is now regenerating naturally as a mixed woodland. It has rare invertebrates, lichens and fungi together with birds such as blackcaps and nuthatches.

There is access from Crooksbury Road or Compton Way in Runfold.
