= Littlefield Common =

Nature reserve in Worplesdon, Surrey

Coordinates: 51.264°N 0.625°W

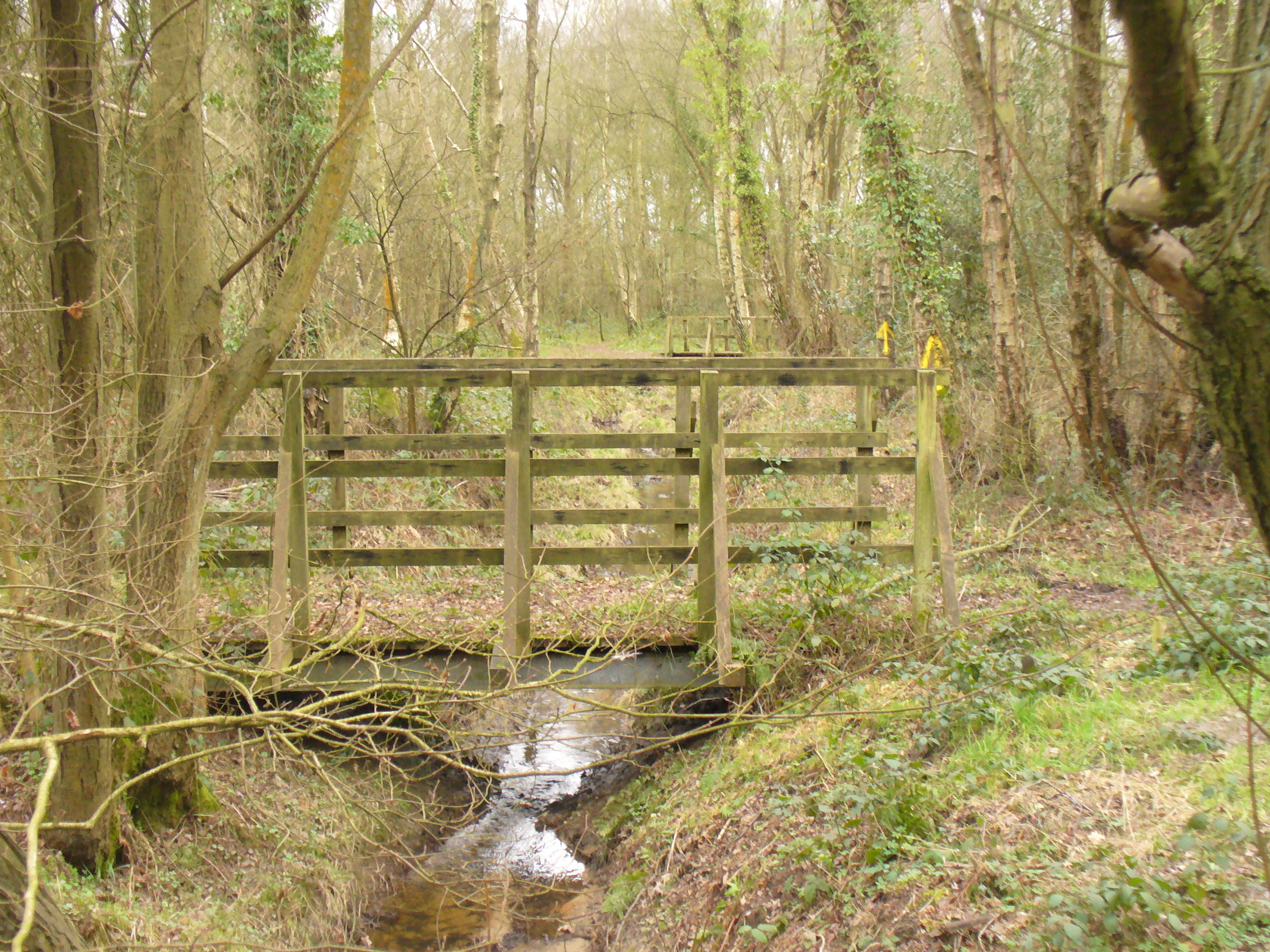
- Interactive map of Littlefield Common
- Type: Nature reserve
- Location: Worplesdon, Surrey
- OS grid: SU 960 526
- Area: 17 hectares (42 acres)
- Manager: Surrey Wildlife Trust

Littlefield Common is a 17-hectare (42-acre) nature reserve south-west of Worplesdon in Surrey. It is owned by Surrey County Council and managed by the Surrey Wildlife Trust.

The common has wet and dry woodland, heath, grassland and ponds, which have a variety of amphibians such as newts, toads and frogs. Flora include common yellow sedge and heath spotted-orchid.

There is access from Aldershot Road.
