= Stringer's Common =

Nature reserve in Surrey, England

Coordinates: 51.268°N 0.582°W

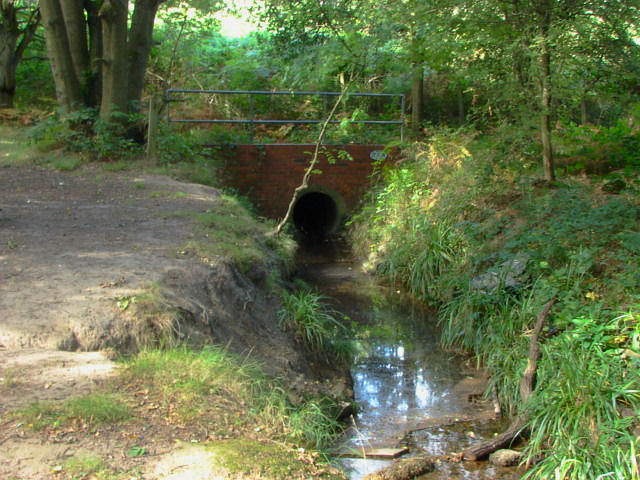
- Interactive map of Stringer's Common
- Type: Nature reserve
- Location: Worplesdon, Surrey
- OS grid: SU990530
- Area: 30 hectares (74 acres)
- Manager: Surrey Wildlife Trust

Stringer's Common is a 30-hectare (74-acre) nature reserve east of Worplesdon in Surrey. It is owned by Surrey County Council and managed by the Surrey Wildlife Trust.

This is one of eight commons in the parish of Worplesdon near Guildford. It was formerly used for grazing, but it is now mainly mixed woodland with some heath and grassland.

There is public access to the site.
