= Pucks Oak Barn and McAlmont Reserves =

Nature reserve in Surrey, England

Coordinates: 51.213°N 0.633°W

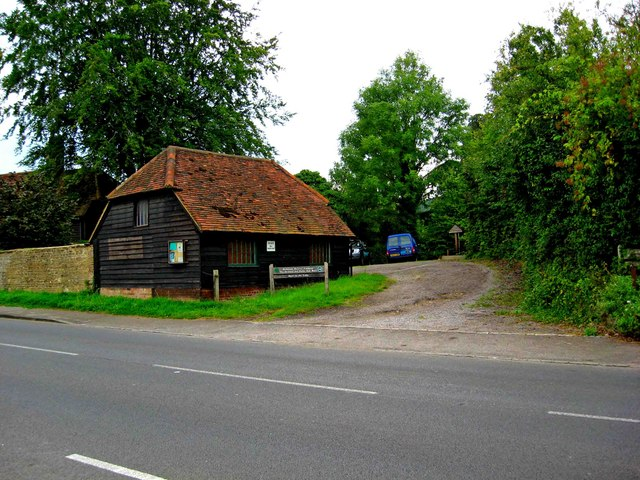
- Interactive map of Pucks Oak Barn and McAlmont Reserves
- Type: Nature reserve
- Location: Compton, Guildford, Surrey
- OS grid: SU956469
- Area: 4 hectares (9.9 acres)
- Manager: Surrey Wildlife Trust

Pucks Oak Barn and McAlmont Reserves is a 4-hectare (9.9-acre) nature reserve near Compton, west of Guildford in Surrey. It is managed by the Surrey Wildlife Trust.

This site is composed of four small woodland reserves, Farncombe Wood, Glebe Wood, Hayden's Copse and Pucks Oak Barn & Orchard. Ground flora include bluebells, wood anemone, ground elder and yellow archangel.
