= Brentmoor Heath =

Nature reserve in Surrey, United Kingdom

Coordinates: 51.340°N 0.655°W

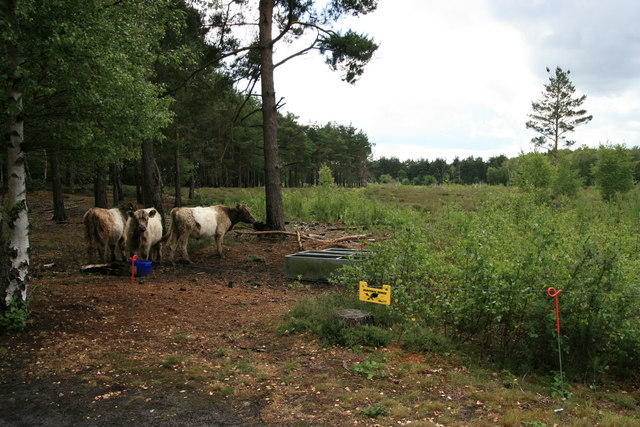
- Interactive map of Brentmoor Heath
- Type: Local Nature Reserve
- Location: Camberley, Surrey
- OS grid: SU 938 610
- Area: 28.6 hectares (71 acres)
- Manager: Surrey Wildlife Trust

Brentmoor Heath is a 28.6-hectare (71-acre) Local Nature Reserve east of Camberley in Surrey. It is part of Brentmoor Heath and Folly Bog nature reserve, the ownership of which is divided between the Ministry of Defence, Surrey County Council and Surrey Heath Borough Council, and is managed by Surrey Wildlife Trust. The site is also part of Colony Bog and Bagshot Heath site of Special Scientific Interest, Thursley, Ash, Pirbright & Chobham Special Area of Conservation and Thames Basin Heaths Special Protection Area.

The nature reserve has heathland, woodland, acid grassland and ponds. There are grass snakes and adders, and birds such as woodlarks, Dartford warblers, peregrine falcons and hobbies.
