= Rodborough Common, Surrey =

Local Nature Reserve in Surrey, England

Coordinates: 51.166°N 0.668°W

Rodborough Common
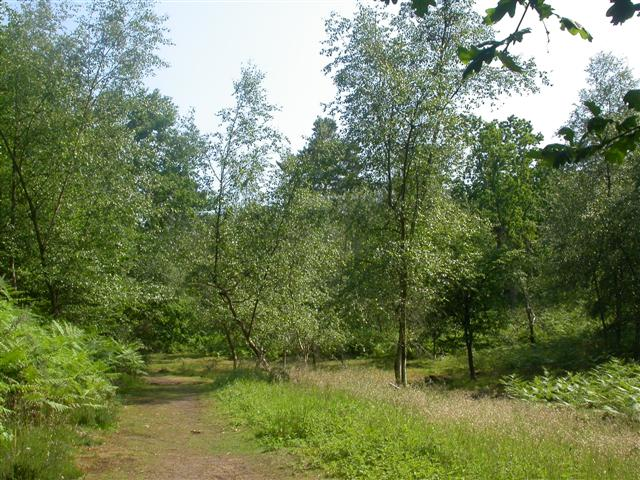
- Interactive map of Rodborough Common
- Type: Local Nature Reserve
- Location: Milford, Surrey
- OS grid: SU 932 416
- Area: 62.2 hectares (154 acres)
- Manager: Surrey Wildlife Trust

Rodborough Common is a 62.2-hectare (154-acre) Local Nature Reserve west of Milford in Surrey. It is owned by Surrey County Council and managed by Surrey Wildlife Trust.

Sheep and cattle were grazed on the common in the nineteenth century and it was used for military exercises in the Second World War. It has heath, woodland and acid grassland. Flora include greater stitchwort, enchanter's nightshade and germander speedwell, and there are reptiles such as grass snakes, slowworms and common lizards.

There is access from Portsmouth Road.
