= Cucknell's Wood =

Nature reserve in Surrey, England

Coordinates: 51.177°N 0.512°W

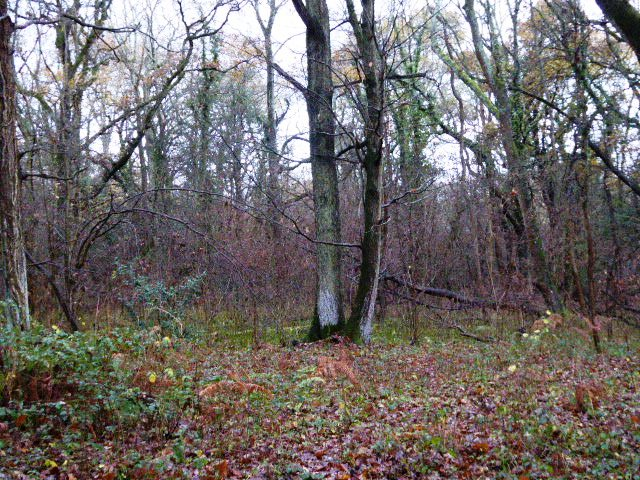
- Interactive map of Cucknell's Wood
- Type: Nature reserve
- Location: Shamley Green, Surrey
- OS grid: TQ 041 430
- Area: 11 hectares (27 acres)
- Manager: Surrey Wildlife Trust

Cucknell's Wood is a 11-hectare (27-acre) nature reserve south-east of Shamley Green in Surrey. It is managed by the Surrey Wildlife Trust.

Birds in this 400 year old semi-natural wood include great spotted woodpecker, lesser spotted woodpecker, willow tit, treecreeper, nuthatch, goldcrest, green woodpecker and tawny owl. There are mammals such as dormice.

There is access on foot from Stroud Lane. There is no parking, Stroud Lane is mostly a single track road with passing places.

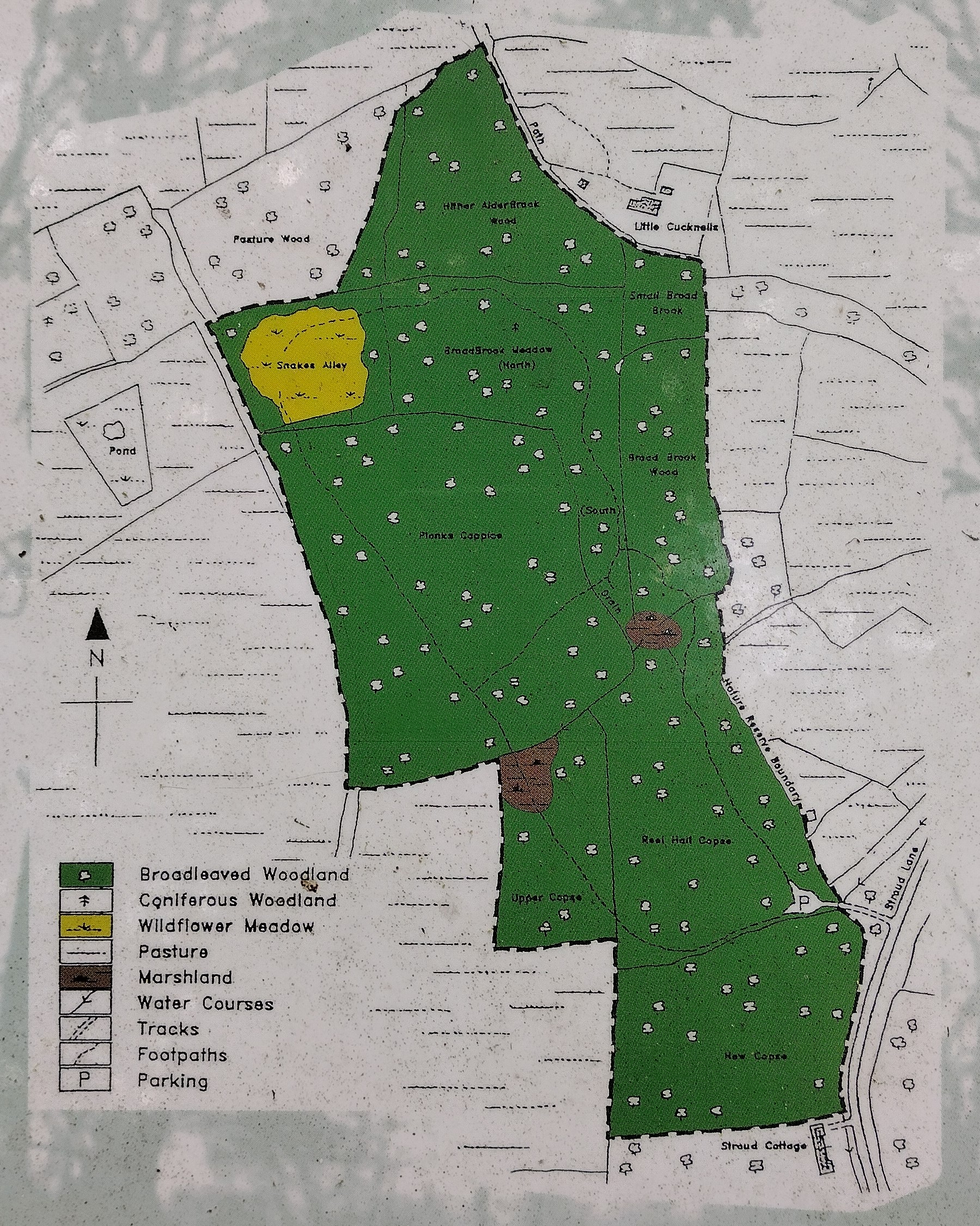
A map of the site
