= Barossa nature reserve =

Nature reserve in Surrey, England

Coordinates: 51.351°N 0.745°W

Barossa
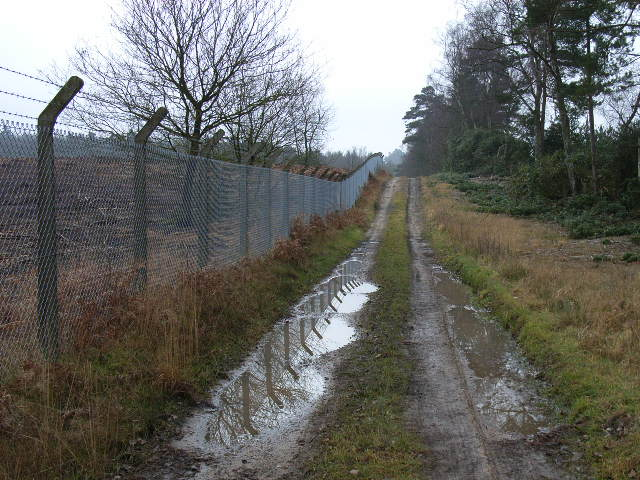
- Interactive map of Barossa
- Type: Nature reserve
- Location: Camberley, Surrey
- OS grid: SU 875 621
- Area: 498 hectares (1,230 acres)
- Manager: Surrey Wildlife Trust

Barossa is a 498-hectare (1,230-acre) nature reserve north of Camberley in Surrey. It is owned by the Ministry of Defence and managed by the Surrey Wildlife Trust. It is part of the Thames Basin Heaths Special Protection Area and the Broadmoor to Bagshot Woods and Heaths Site of Special Scientific Interest

This site is mainly heathland with areas of pine and deciduous woodland. Birds include nightjars, woodlarks and Dartford warblers, there are snakes such as adders and grass snakes and lizards include slow worms and common lizards.
