= Milford Green and Coxhill Green =

Nature Reserves in Chobham, Surrey, British Columbia

Coordinates: 51.338°N 0.587°W

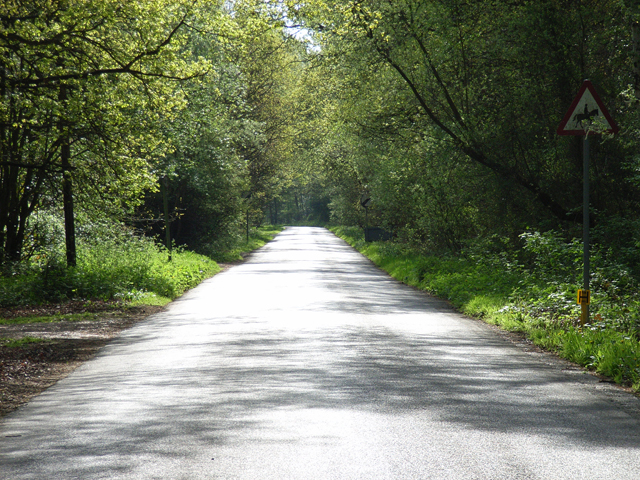
- Interactive map of Milford Green and Coxhill Green
- Type: Nature reserve
- Location: Chobham, Surrey
- OS grid: SU985608
- Area: 15 hectares (37 acres)
- Manager: Surrey Wildlife Trust

Milford Green and Coxhill Green is a 15-hectare (37-acre) nature reserve south-east of Chobham in Surrey. It is owned by Surrey County Council and managed by the Surrey Wildlife Trust.

These greens have wet and dry woodland with several ponds. Milford Green is mainly oak with other trees such as silver birch, horse chestnut, sweet chestnut, beech and elm. Coxhill Green is broad-leaved woodland with an area of Scots pine.
