= Hill Park, Tatsfield =

Nature reserve in Surrey, England

Coordinates: 51.284°N 0.039°W

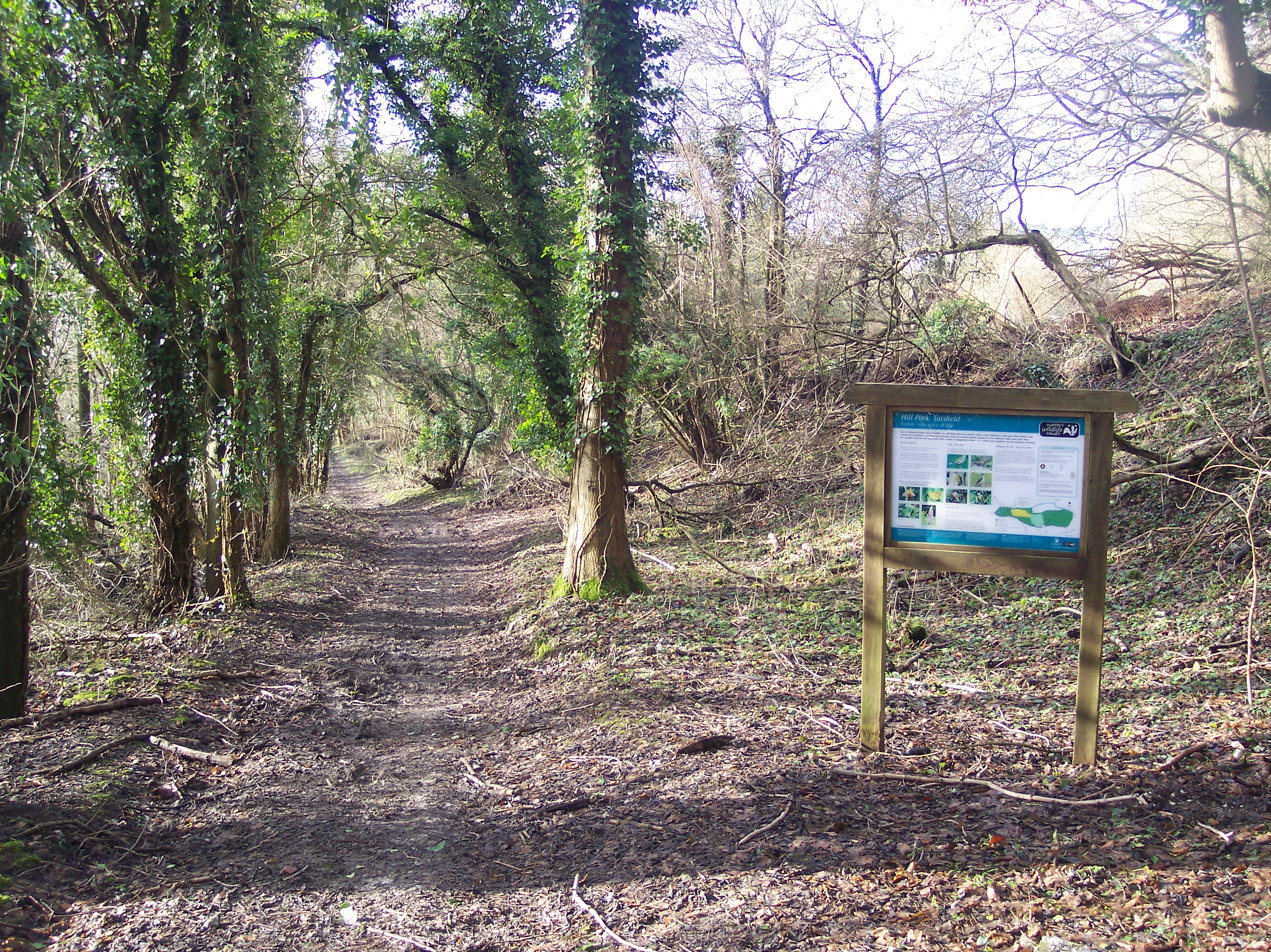
- Interactive map of Hill Park, Tatsfield
- Type: Local Nature Reserve
- Location: Tatsfield, Surrey
- OS grid: TQ 423 559
- Area: 24.5 hectares (61 acres)
- Manager: Surrey Wildlife Trust

Hill Park, Tatsfield is a 24.5-hectare (61-acre) Local Nature Reserve south of Tatsfield in Surrey. It is owned by Surrey County Council and managed by Surrey Wildlife Trust.

This site on the slope of the North Downs has flora-rich chalk grassland with fly, bee and pyramidal orchids. There is also woodland with ash, beech, yew and an avenue of horse chestnut.

There is access from Chestnut Avenue.
