= Graeme Hendrey Wood =

Nature reserve in Surrey, United Kingdom

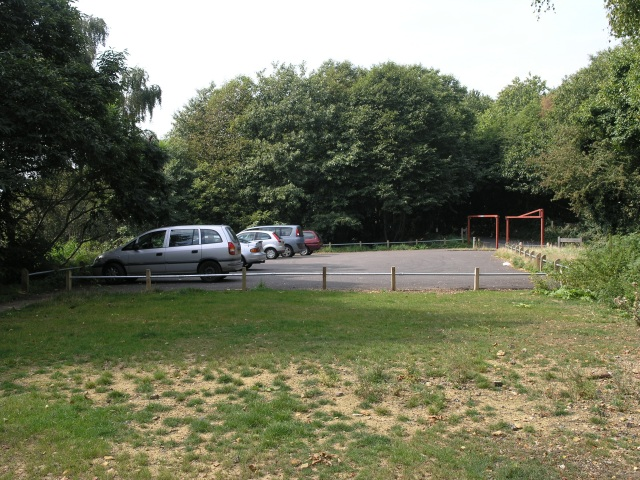
- Interactive map of Graeme Hendrey Wood
- Type: Nature reserve
- Location: Bletchingley, Surrey
- OS grid: TQ346501
- Coordinates: 51.234°N 0.073°W
- Area: 10 hectares (25 acres)
- Manager: Surrey Wildlife Trust

Graeme Hendrey Wood is a 10-hectare (25-acre) nature reserve east of Bletchingley in Surrey. It is managed by the Surrey Wildlife Trust.

This former sand and gravel quarry is now a wood, with ash, oak, sycamore, sweet chestnut, hazel and silver birch. Ground flora include enchanter’s nightshade, bird's-nest orchid and dog’s mercury.

There is access from Rabies Heath Road.
