= Vann Lake and Ockley Woods =

Protected area in Surrey, England

Coordinates: 51.138°N 0.353°W

- Site of Special Scientific Interest
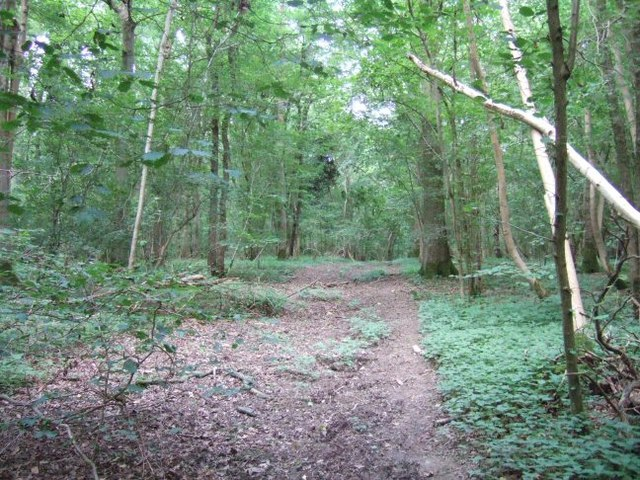
- Location of Vann Lake and Ockley Woods.
- Area of search: Surrey
- Grid reference: TQ 153 389
- Interest: Biological
- Area: 57.8 hectares (143 acres)
- Notification date: 1986
- Location map: Magic Map

Vann Lake and Ockley Woods is a 57.8-hectare (143-acre) biological Site of Special Scientific Interest south of Ockley in Surrey. Vann Lake is part of Vann Lake and Candy's Copse, a nature reserve managed by the Surrey Wildlife Trust.

This site has a lake and ancient woodland which is botanically rich, especially for mosses, liverworts and fungi. There are diverse species of breeding birds and invertebrates include the rare Molophilus lackschewitzianus cranefly and purple emperor and silver-washed fritillary butterflies. There is also a population of dormice.
