= Farncombe Wood =

Nature reserve in Surrey, England

Coordinates: 51.201°N 0.617°W

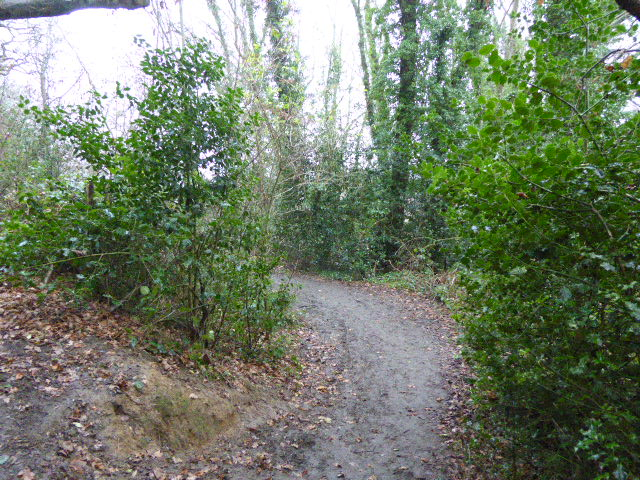
- Interactive map of Farncombe Wood
- Type: Nature reserve
- Location: Farncombe, Surrey
- OS grid: SU967455
- Area: 1 hectare (2.5 acres)
- Manager: Surrey Wildlife Trust

Farncombe Wood is a 1-hectare (2.5-acre) nature reserve in Farncombe in Surrey. It is owned and managed by the Surrey Wildlife Trust.

This steeply sloping wood was donated to the trust in 2003. It is mainly hazel coppice with oak standards. Ground flora include bluebells, wood anemone, yellow archangel and pignut.

Access is by going along Huxley Close, carrying straight on along a footpath when the road turns right, turning sharp left down a steep path and keeping to the left.
