= Bisley and West End Commons =

Nature reserve in Surrey, United Kingdom

Coordinates: 51.327°N 0.651°W

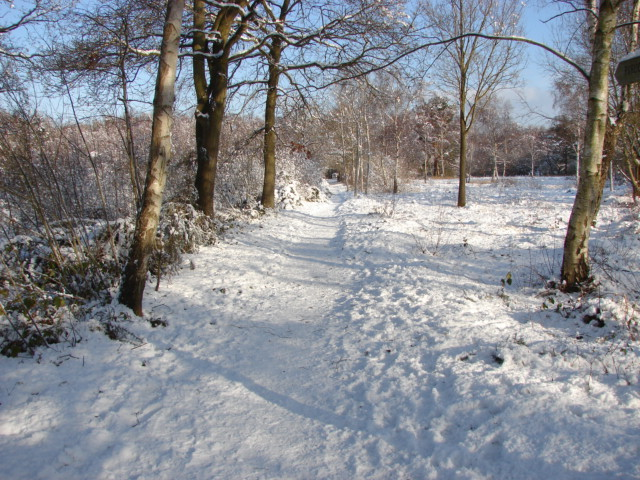
- Bisley Common
- Interactive map of Bisley and West End Commons
- Type: Local Nature Reserve
- Location: Woking, Surrey
- OS grid: SU 941 595
- Area: 37.2 hectares (92 acres)
- Manager: Surrey Wildlife Trust

Bisley and West End Commons is a 37.2-hectare (92-acre) Local Nature Reserve west of Woking in Surrey. It is part of the 46-hectare (110-acre) Bisley & West End Commons and Reidon Hill nature reserve, which is owned by Surrey County Council and managed by Surrey Wildlife Trust. The site is also part of the Colony Bog and Bagshot Heath Site of Special Scientific Interest, the Thursley, Ash, Pirbright & Chobham Special Area of Conservation and the Thames Basin Heaths Special Protection Area,

This site has heath, grassland and woodland. There are mammals such as roe deer and reptiles include adders, grass snakes, slow-worms and common lizards.
