= Quarry Hangers =

Protected area in Surrey, England

Coordinates: 51.267°N 0.112°W

- Site of Special Scientific Interest
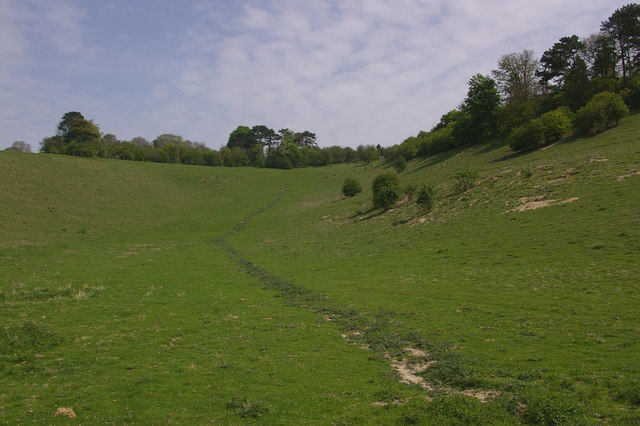
- Location of Quarry Hangers.
- Area of search: Surrey
- Grid reference: TQ 318 537
- Interest: Biological
- Area: 28.5 hectares (70 acres)
- Notification date: 1986
- Location map: Magic Map

Quarry Hangers is a 28.5-hectare (70-acre) biological Site of Special Scientific Interest south-west of Caterham in Surrey. An area of 11 hectares (27 acres) is a nature reserve managed by the Surrey Wildlife Trust.

This sloping site on the North Downs has species-rich chalk grassland, woodland and scrub. Heavily grazed areas are dominated by red fescue and sheep’s fescue, with flowering plants including horseshoe vetch, bird’s-foot trefoil and wild thyme. There is a taller sward in less grazed areas, with grasses such as upright brome and wood false-brome.
