= Colekitchen Down =

Nature reserve in Surrey, England

Coordinates: 51.228°N 0.448°W

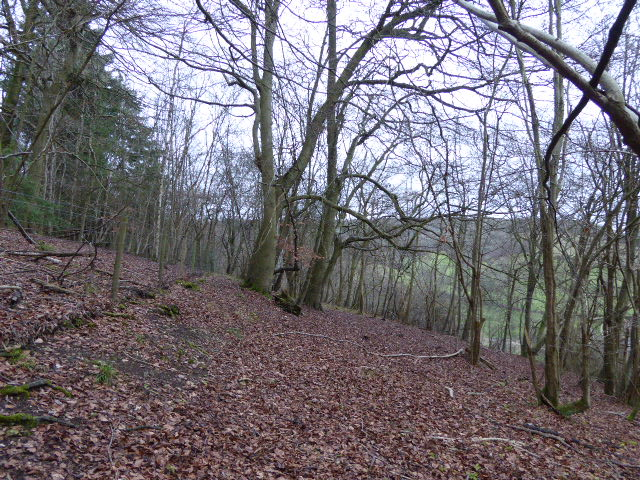
- Interactive map of Colekitchen Down
- Type: Nature reserve
- Location: Gomshall, Surrey
- OS grid: TQ084488
- Area: 3 hectares (7.4 acres)
- Manager: Surrey Wildlife Trust

Colekitchen Down is a 3-hectare (7.4-acre) nature reserve north of Gomshall in Surrey. It is managed by the Surrey Wildlife Trust.

This sloping area of species-rich unimproved chalk grassland is surrounded by woodland and scrub. There is a variety of butterflies including chalkhill blue, small heath, adonis blue, gatekeeper, brimstone and marbled white.

There is no public access.
