= Wallis Wood =

Nature reserve in Surrey, England

Coordinates: 51.138°N 0.399°W

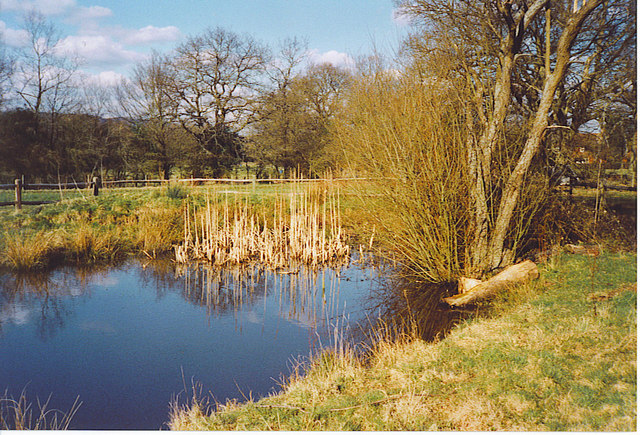
- Interactive map of Wallis Wood
- Type: Nature reserve
- Location: Ewhurst, Surrey
- OS grid: TQ121389
- Area: 14 hectares (35 acres)
- Manager: Surrey Wildlife Trust

Wallis Wood is a 14-hectare (35-acre) nature reserve south-east of Ewhurst in Surrey. It is managed by the Surrey Wildlife Trust.

A stream runs through this woodland reserve, which has an area of meadow pasture on its bank. Woodland flora include bluebells, broad-leaved helleborine orchids, violet helleborine orchids, common spotted orchids, primroses and wood anemone. There is a rare spider, Hyptiotes paradoxus, which lives in yew trees and is only found in one other site in the county.

There is access from Horsham Road in Walliswood.
