= Brookwood Lye =

Nature reserve in England

Coordinates: 51.307°N 0.620°W

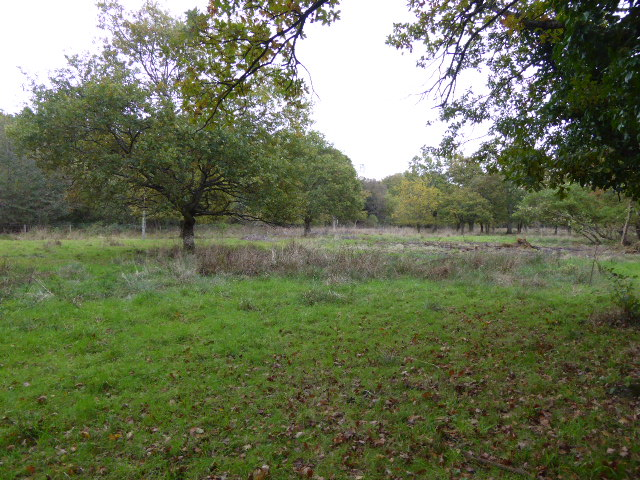
- Interactive map of Brookwood Lye
- Type: Nature reserve
- Location: Brookwood, Surrey
- OS grid: SU963573
- Area: 22 hectares (54 acres)
- Manager: Surrey Wildlife Trust

Brookwood Lye is a 22-hectare (54-acre) nature reserve in Brookwood in Surrey. It is managed by the Surrey Wildlife Trust. The site borders the A324 road to the South and the Basingstoke Canal to the North.

This is mainly wet grassland which has a rich variety of flora. Other habitats include alder carr and broadleaved woodland. There are many birds and invertebrates such as dragonflies.

There is no public access to the site.
