= Seale Chalk Pit =

Chalk quarry in Surrey, England

Coordinates: 51.225°N 0.714°W

- Site of Special Scientific Interest
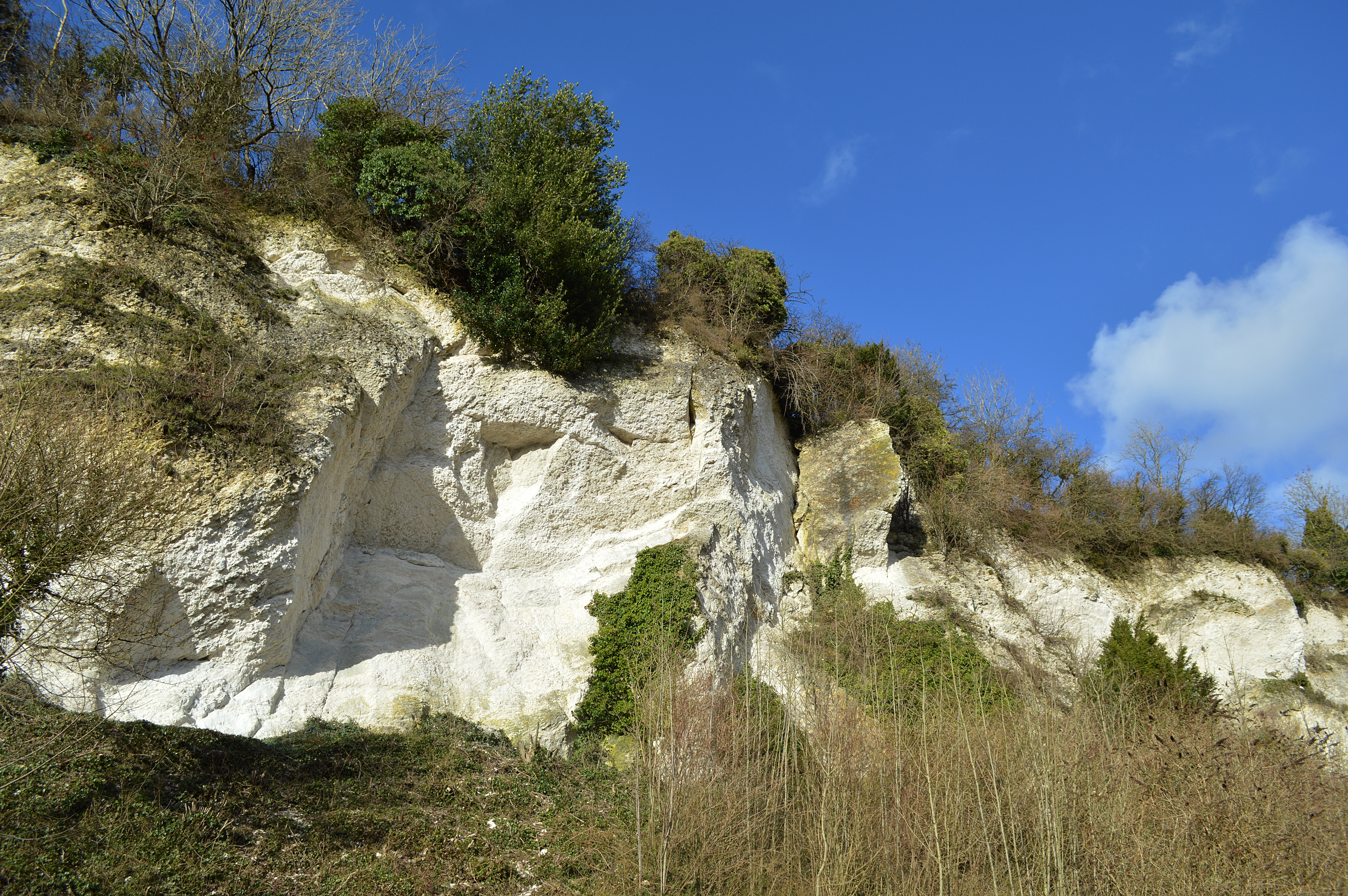
- Location of Seale Chalk Pit.
- Area of search: Surrey
- Grid reference: SU 899 481
- Interest: Geological
- Area: 1.2 hectares (3.0 acres)
- Notification date: 1989
- Location map: Magic Map

Seale Chalk Pit is a 1.2-hectare (3.0-acre) geological Site of Special Scientific Interest west of Guildford in Surrey. It is a Geological Conservation Review site and part of the Seale Chalk Pit and Meadow 3-hectare (7.4-acre) private nature reserve, which is managed by the Surrey Wildlife Trust.

This former quarry exposes rocks of the Hog’s Back, and exhibits the separation of the folding Mesozoic rocks of the Weald from the Tertiary sediments of the London Basin.

There is no public access.

== Land ownership ==
All land within Seale Chalk Pit SSSI is owned by the local authority.
