= Hackhurst and White Downs =

Protected area in Surrey, England

Coordinates: 51.230°N 0.402°W

- Site of Special Scientific Interest
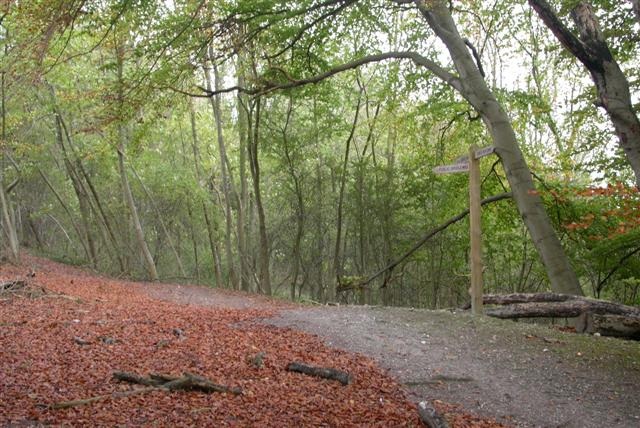
- Hackhurst Downs
- Location of Hackhurst and White Downs.
- Area of search: Surrey
- Grid reference: TQ 117 491
- Interest: Biological
- Area: 185.1 hectares (457 acres)
- Notification date: 1986
- Location map: Magic Map

Hackhurst and White Downs is a 185.1-hectare (457-acre) biological Site of Special Scientific Interest west of Dorking in Surrey. White Downs is a Nature Conservation Review site, Grade 2, and part of it is in the 200-hectare (490-acre) White Downs nature reserve, which is owned by the Wotton Estate and managed by the Surrey Wildlife Trust (SWT). Hackhurst Downs is a 29.9-hectare (74-acre) Local Nature Reserve, which part of the 40-hectare (99-acre) Hackhurst Downs nature reserve, which is owned by Surrey County Council and also managed by the SWT.

This steeply sloping land is a shared escarpment with Ranmore Common, amounting to an almost whole section of the North Downs, which has grassland, secondary woodland and scrub. It has a rich invertebrate fauna with forty species of butterfly, including adonis blue, chalkhill blue, brown hairstreak, Duke of Burgundy fritillary, marbled white and silver-spotted skipper.
