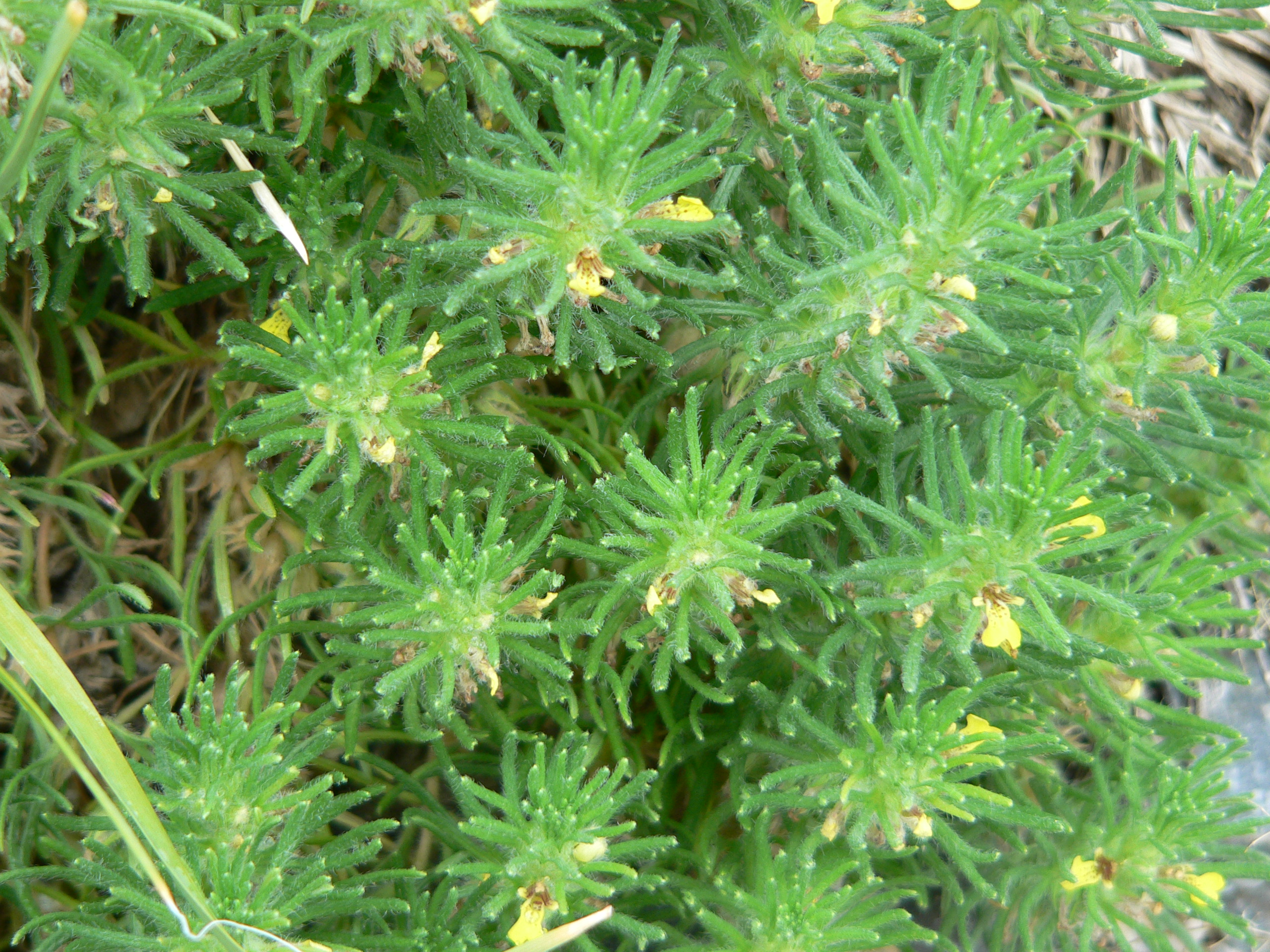

Scientific classification
- Kingdom: Plantae
- Clade: Tracheophytes
- Clade: Angiosperms
- Clade: Eudicots
- Clade: Asterids
- Order: Lamiales
- Family: Lamiaceae
- Genus: Ajuga
- Species: A. chamaepitys

Binomial name
- Ajuga chamaepitys (L.) Schreb.

= Ajuga chamaepitys =

Yellow bugle

Species of flowering plant

Ajuga chamaepitys is a species of flowering plant of the family Lamiaceae. Popularly known as yellow bugle, Chian bugle or ground-pine, the plant has many of the same characteristics and properties as Ajuga reptans. A. chamaepitys can be found in Europe, the Eastern part of the Mediterranean, and North Africa.

== Description ==
Ajuga chamaepitys is a small herbaceous perennial that reaches 10–40 cm in height. The leaves have an opposite arrangement. Its flowering season is generally in late spring. Ground pine is a plant whose richness has been severely reduced by changes to downland farming. At first sight, A. chamaepitys looks like a tiny pine tree with a reddish purple four-cornered hairy stem. The leaves can get up to 4 cm long, are divided into three linear lobes, and, when crushed, have a smell similar to pine needles. Ground pine sheds its shiny black seeds close to the parent plant and the seeds can remain alive in the soil for up to 50 years.

== Herbal use ==
Ajuga chamaepitys has stimulant, diuretic and emmenagogue action and is considered by herbalists to form a good remedy for gout and rheumatism and also to be useful in female disorders. In the Levant, the plant has traditionally been used by locals as an analgesic. Ground pine was a plant well known to Tudor herbalists who exploited the resins contained within the leaves. The herb was formerly regarded almost as a specific in gouty and rheumatic affections. The plant leaves were dried and reduced to powder. It formed an ingredient of the once famous gout remedy, Portland Powder. It was composed of the leaves of Ajuga camaepitys, which has a slightly turpentine-like smell and a rough taste, with properties described as being similar to diluted alcohol.
