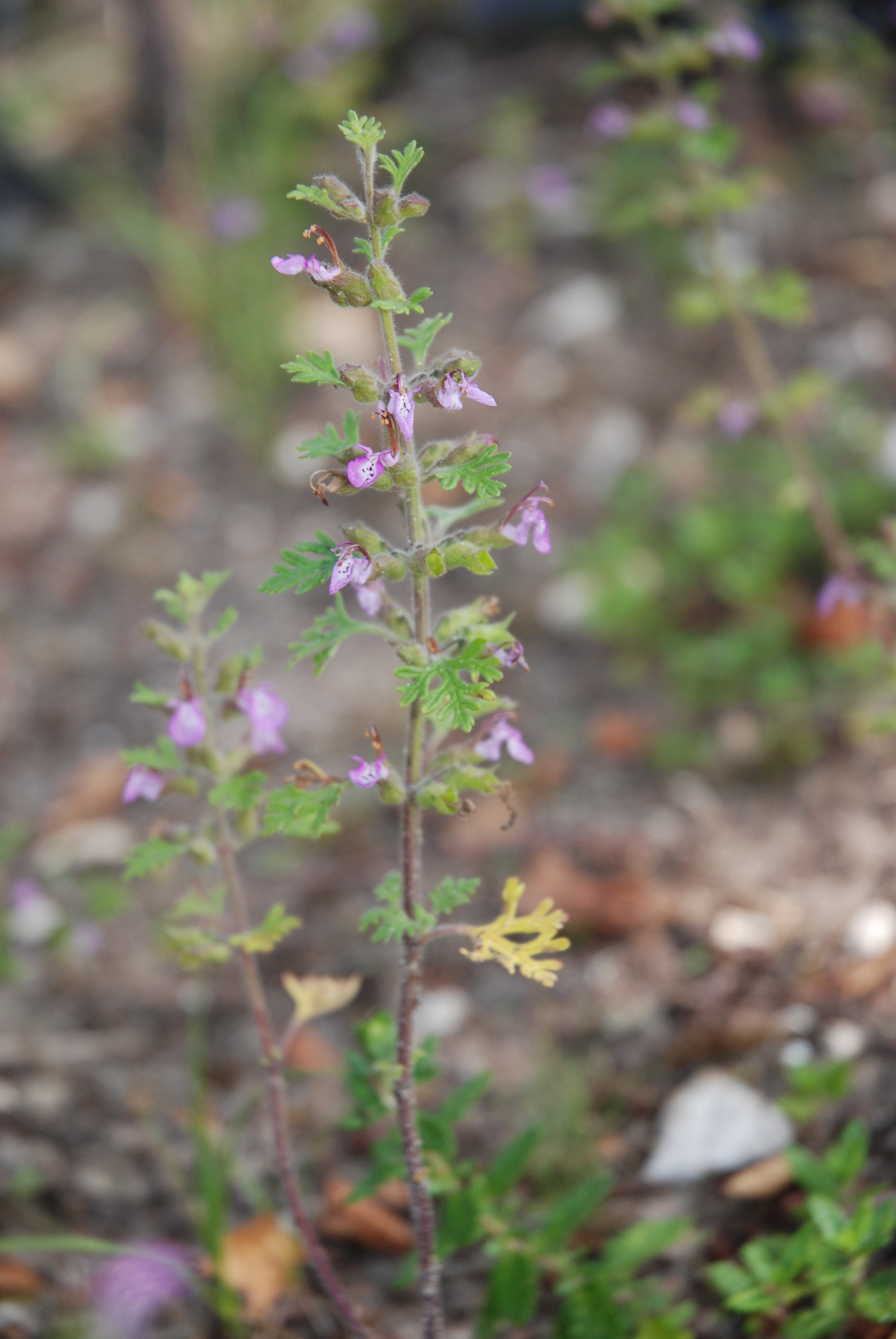

Scientific classification
- Kingdom: Plantae
- Clade: Tracheophytes
- Clade: Angiosperms
- Clade: Eudicots
- Clade: Asterids
- Order: Lamiales
- Family: Lamiaceae
- Genus: Teucrium
- Species: T. botrys

Binomial name
- Teucrium botrys L.

= Teucrium botrys =

Species of flowering plant

Teucrium botrys, the cutleaf germander or cut-leaved germander is a low to short downy annual, sometimes biennial, plant. It was noted by Carl Linnaeus in 1753 and is classified as part of the genus Teucrium in the family Lamiaceae. It has oval, but deeply cut leaves, which appear almost pinnate in form. Its flowers are two-lipped but with the upper lip diminutive. They are pink to purple and form from the stem at the base of the leaves, in whorls. It is in flower in the northern hemisphere from June to October. It prefers limy soils and bare stony ground. It is native to Western Europe, especially France and Germany. It has been introduced into north-eastern North America.

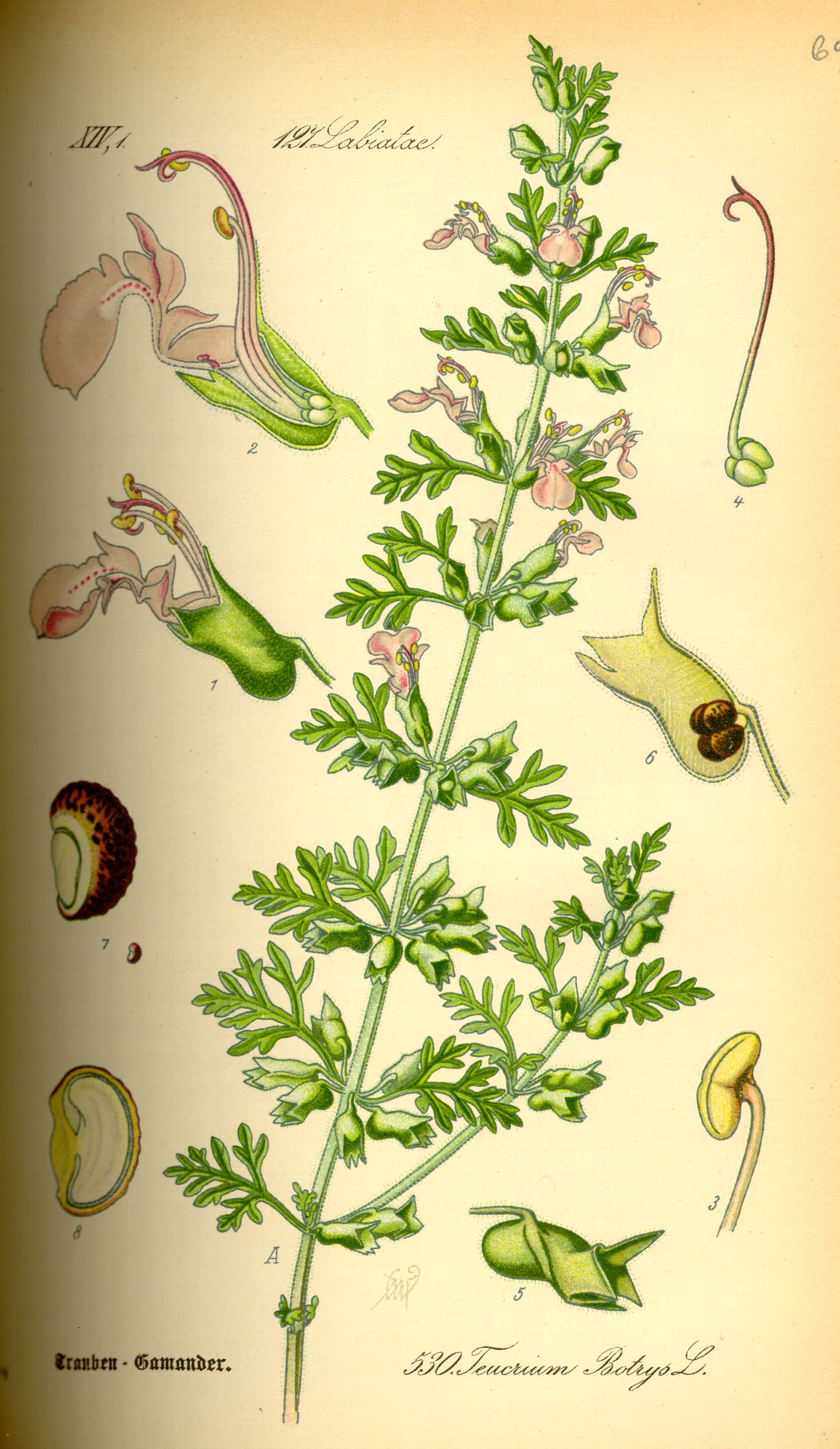
Teucrium botrys
