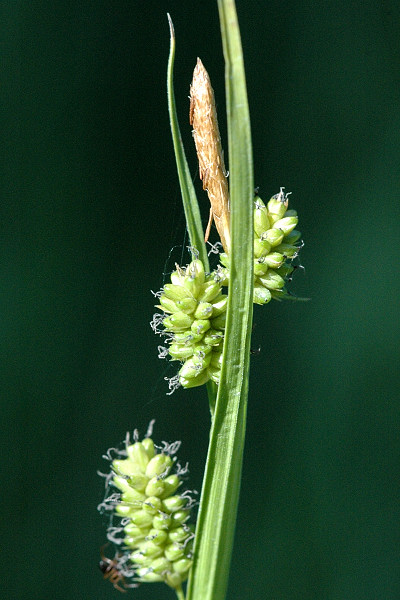
- Inflorescence

Scientific classification
- Kingdom: Plantae
- Clade: Tracheophytes
- Clade: Angiosperms
- Clade: Monocots
- Clade: Commelinids
- Order: Poales
- Family: Cyperaceae
- Genus: Carex
- Species: C. demissa

Binomial name
- Carex demissa Hornem.

Synonyms
- Carex flava subsp. demissa (Hornem.) O.Bolòs, Masalles & Vigo; Carex flava f. demissa (Hornem.) Kük.; Carex oederi subsp. demissa (Hornem.) C.Vicioso

= Carex demissa =

Species of grass-like plant

Carex demissa is a species of sedge (genus Carex) native to Iceland, Macaronesia, all of Europe, and western Asia, extending to the Himalayas and possibly Greenland. It has been introduced to eastern Canada, New Jersey, and Tasmania. It is a member of the Carex flava species complex.

== Subspecies ==
The following subspecies are currently accepted:

- Carex demissa subsp. cedercreutzii (Fagerstr.) Jac.Koopman – Azores
- Carex demissa subsp. demissa – Europe, Madeira, Canary Islands, the Caucasus, Iran, Afghanistan, and the western Himalayas
