= List of Sites of Special Scientific Interest in Surrey =

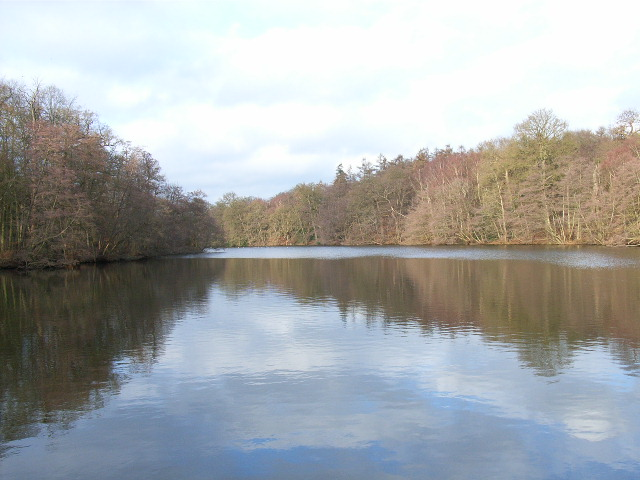
Johnson's Pond in Windsor Great Park

In England, Sites of Special Scientific Interest (SSSIs) are designated by Natural England, which is responsible for protecting England's natural environment. Designation as an SSSI gives legal protection to the most important wildlife and geological sites. As of May 2019, there are 62 Sites of Special Scientific Interest in the county, 52 of which have been designated for their biological interest, 8 for their geological interest, and 2 for both biological and geological interest.

Surrey is a county in South East England. It has an area of 642 square miles (1,660 square kilometres) and an estimated population of 1.1 million as of 2017. It is bordered by Greater London, Kent, East Sussex, West Sussex, Hampshire and Berkshire. Its top level of government is provided by Surrey County Council and the lower level by eleven boroughs and districts, Elmbridge, Epsom and Ewell, Guildford, Mole Valley, Reigate and Banstead, Runnymede, Spelthorne, Surrey Heath, Tandridge, Waverley and Woking.

Fourteen sites are also Special Protection Areas, six are Special Areas of Conservation, six are Ramsar sites, eleven are Nature Conservation Review sites, ten are Geological Conservation Review sites, twelve are local nature reserves, three are national nature reserves and one is on the Register of Historic Parks and Gardens. Five include scheduled monuments and twenty-six are managed by the Surrey Wildlife Trust.

== Key ==
=== Interest ===
- B = site of biological interest
- G = site of geological interest

=== Public access ===
- FP = access to footpaths through the site only
- No = no public access to site
- PP = public access to part of site
- Yes = public access to all or most of the site

=== Other classifications ===
- GCR = Geological Conservation Review site
- LNR = Local nature reserve
- NCR = Nature Conservation Review site
- NNR = National nature reserve
- Ramsar = Ramsar site, an internationally important wetland site
- RHPG = Register of Historic Parks and Gardens of Special Historic Interest in England
- SAC = Special Area of Conservation
- SM = Scheduled monument
- SPA = Special Protection Area under the European Union Directive on the Conservation of Wild Birds
- SWT = Surrey Wildlife Trust

== Sites ==
Site name	Photograph	B	G	Area (Note: The area and grid reference are taken from the "Details" page for each site on the Natural England database.)	Public access	Location	Other classifications	Map (Note: The maps are provided by Natural England on the Magic Map website.)	Citation (Note: Citations are provided for each site by Natural England.)	Description
Ash to Brookwood Heaths	Ash to Brookwood Heaths	✓		1,576.3 hectares (3,895 acres)	PP	Woking; 51.277°N 0.687°W; SU 917 539	NCR, SAC, SPA, SWT	Map	Citation	This site has dry heathland, wet heath and bog. Large areas have been protected from development because they are army training ranges. The site is important for mosses and liverworts and there are nationally important populations of European nightjars, woodlarks, Dartford warblers and hobbies.
Auclaye	Auclaye		✓	0.6 hectares (1.5 acres)	NO	Dorking; 51.137°N 0.332°W; TQ 168 388	GCR	Map	Citation	This site is important for its fossils of Mesozoic insects, with many well preserved bodies from several orders dating to the Lower Cretaceous period. It has produced new species of aculeata (wasps, ants and bees) and crickets.
Banstead Downs	Banstead Downs	✓		126.7 hectares (313 acres)	PP	Sutton; 51.334°N 0.204°W; TQ 252 610	SM	Map	Citation	This downland site has large areas of woodland, chalk grassland and scrub. It is important for birds, with 57 species recorded, out of which 44 breed there. Breeding species include European stonechat, grasshopper warbler, lesser whitethroat, great and lesser spotted woodpecker and tawny owl. There is a rich chalk flora.
Basingstoke Canal	Basingstoke Canal	✓		101.3 hectares (250 acres)	PP	Farnborough; 51.277°N 0.778°W; SU 855 538	NCR	Map (Note: This site is partly in Hampshire)	Citation	This is the most botanically rich aquatic area in England and flora include hairlike pondweed and tasteless water-pepper, both of which are nationally scarce. The site is also nationally important for its invertebrates. There are 24 species of dragonfly and other species include two nationally rare Red Data Book insects.
Blackheath	Blackheath	✓		141.6 hectares (350 acres)	YES	Guildford; 51.204°N 0.516°W; TQ 038 460		Map	Citation	This area of dry lowland heath and acid grassland is managed for conservation and fauna includes a wide range of breeding birds, the vulnerable heathland spider Oxyopes heterophthalmus and the rare beetle Lomechusoides strumosa. There is also woodland which has a rare moss, Dicranum polysetum.
Blindley Heath	Blindley Heath	✓		26.3 hectares (65 acres)	YES	Lingfield; 51.186°N 0.046°W; TQ 367 448	LNR, SWT	Map	Citation	This damp grassland site on Weald Clay has a rich flora. There are also a number of ponds and the Ray Brook runs through the heath. The grassland is dominated by tussock grass and there are scattered oaks, hawthorns, willows and blackthorns.
Bookham Commons	Bookham Common	✓		154.7 hectares (382 acres)	YES	Leatherhead; 51.296°N 0.384°W; TQ 128 564		Map	Citation	These commons have a variety of habitats. Approximately two-thirds of the site is woodland, but there are also areas of scrub, grassland and open water. Many species of insects have been recorded, including 611 beetles, 1140 flies, 146 bugs, 201 spiders, 17 dragonflies and more than 300 butterflies and moths. This represents over one quarter of the British list for these species.
Bourley and Long Valley	Bourley and Long Valley	✓		823.5 hectares (2,035 acres)	PP	Fleet; 51.255°N 0.806°W; SU 834 513	SPA	Map	Citation	Predominantly in Hampshire, part of the southern area, including Caesar's Camp, straddles the border of Surrey and Hampshire. This site has varied habitats, with heath, woodland, scrub, mire and grassland. The heathland is important for three vulnerable birds, woodlarks, European nightjars and Dartford warblers. There is a rich invertebrate fauna, including the nationally scarce Eumenes coarctatus potter wasp, silver-studded blue butterfly and downy emerald dragonfly.
Broadmoor to Bagshot Woods and Heaths	Bagshot Heath	✓		1,696.3 hectares (4,192 acres)	PP	Camberley; 51.386°N 0.742°W; SU 877 640	SPA, SWT	Map (Note: This site is partly in Berkshire)	Citation	These woods have a variety of habitats with broadleaved woodland, a conifer plantation, heathland, valley mire and ponds. The heath and plantation support internationally important populations of three vulnerable birds, woodlark, European nightjar and Dartford warbler, together with nationally important populations of dragonflies and damselflies.
Brook Brick Pit	Brook Brick Pit		✓	0.9 hectares (2.2 acres)	NO	Godalming; 51.132°N 0.672°W; SU 930 378	GCR	Map	Citation	This site exposes rocks of the Atherfield Clay Formation, dating to the Aptian stage of the Lower Cretaceous around 120 million years ago. It shows the onset of marine conditions in southern England in the Aptian and it has diverse bivalve fossils.
Charleshill	Charleshill	✓		10.1 hectares (25 acres)	YES	Godalming; 51.188°N 0.721°W; SU 895 440	SWT	Map	Citation	This site has wet and dry meadows with a very wet area which has quaking mire. The mire is dominated by bottle sedge, marsh cinquefoil and bog-bean, together with white sedge in the wettest part. There is also some wet woodland.
Charterhouse to Eashing	Charterhouse to Eashing	✓		68.4 hectares (169 acres)	PP	Godalming; 51.190°N 0.641°W; SU 951 443		Map	Citation	This is a steep valley cut through a broad flood plain. Much of the site is wooded, with areas of tall fen, grassland and standing water. There is a diverse fly population, including several rare species, such as Lonchoptera scutellata cranefly, Stratiomys potamida and the cranefly Gonomyia bifida.
Chiddingfold Forest	Chiddingfold Forest	✓		542.5 hectares (1,341 acres)	PP	Billingshurst; 51.089°N 0.581°W; SU 995 332	SWT	Map (Note: This site is partly in West Sussex)	Citation	The site consists of a number of separate areas with a mosaic of habitats, such as ancient woodland and conifer plantations. Over 500 species of butterflies and moths have been recorded, including several which are rare and endangered, such as the large tortoiseshell butterfly and the rest harrow and orange upperwing moths. Other insects include the Cheilosia carbonaria hoverfly.
Chipstead Downs	Chipstead Downs	✓		157.4 hectares (389 acres)	YES	Banstead; 51.305°N 0.185°W; TQ 266 578	SWT	Map	Citation	This site has ancient woodland and steeply sloping chalk grassland together with associated secondary woodland and scrub. A large part of the grassland is dominated by tor-grass, but in some areas mowing and rabbit grazing have produced a rich chalk grassland flora including the endangered greater yellow-rattle. There are rich bird and butterfly fauna.
Chobham Common	Chobham Common	✓		655.7 hectares (1,620 acres)	YES	Chobham; 51.373°N 0.604°W; SU 973 647	NCR, NNR, SAC, SM, SPA, SWT	Map	Citation	The common has a variety of habitats, such as wet and dry heathland, and its fauna and flora include many rare and scarce species. There are more than eighty birds species, including nationally important breeding populations of European nightjars, woodlarks and Dartford warblers. The site is also very important for invertebrates, with sixty-four rare or scarce species.
Clock House Brickworks	Clock House Brickworks		✓	35.9 hectares (89 acres)	NO	Dorking; 51.135°N 0.321°W; TQ 176 386	GCR	Map	Citation	The pit exposes temperate and subtropical palaeoenvironments of the Weald Clay Group, dating to the Lower Cretaceous. The site is particularly important for its several thousand fossil insects, including the first described social insect, a termite. There are also aquatic plants, fish and reptiles.
Colony Bog and Bagshot Heath	Colony Bog and Bagshot Heath	✓		1,130.5 hectares (2,794 acres)	PP	Woking; 51.326°N 0.367°W; SU 925 594	LNR, NCR, SAC, SPA, SWT	Map	Citation	Habitats in this site include wet and dry heath, bog and unimproved grassland. Much of the site is a military danger area and as a result little is known of its rare fauna and flora. Waterlogged areas have a layer of peat with a mass of peat mosses and a diverse bog flora. Areas of open heath provide a habitat for a variety of heathland bird species to breed.
Colyers Hanger	Colyers Hanger	✓		26.6 hectares (66 acres)	YES	Guildford; 51.224°N 0.518°W; TQ 036 482	NCR, SWT	Map	Citation	This is an area of ancient forest on a south facing slope. It has a variety of woodland types due to the geological diversity of the escarpment at different levels. At the bottom is a stream with poorly drained woodland dominated by alder and a ground layer with plants such as marsh marigold and pendulous sedge.
Combe Bottom	Combe Bottom	✓		42.1 hectares (104 acres)	YES	Guildford; 51.229°N 0.470°W; TQ 069 489	LNR, SWT	Map	Citation	This site on a slope of the North Downs is mainly woodland and scrub, with a small area of unimproved chalk grassland. The woodland is dominated by beech and yew. There is a wide variety of bryophytes, including the rare moss Herzogiella seligeri.
Devil's Punch Bowl	Devil's Punch Bowl	✓		282.2 hectares (697 acres)	YES	Hindhead; 51.120°N 0.727°W; SU 892 364	SPA	Map	Citation	Habitats in this site include broadleaved and conifer woodland, heath and meadows. The invertebrate fauna is rich and varied. More than sixty species of bird breed on the site, including wood warblers, common redstarts, firecrests, redpolls and crossbill.
Dumsey Meadow	Dumsey Meadow	✓		9.6 hectares (24 acres)	YES	Chertsey; 51.388°N 0.484°W; TQ 056 665		Map	Citation	This unimproved and species-rich meadow is grazed by ponies and cattle. The most common grasses are rye-grass, common bent, red fescue and Yorkshire-fog, and there are herbs such as creeping cinquefoil, ribwort plantain and lesser hawkbit.
Epsom and Ashtead Commons	Epsom Common	✓		360.4 hectares (891 acres)	YES	Ashtead; 51.327°N 0.308°W; TQ 180 600	LNR, NNR, SM	Map	Citation	These commons have diverse habitats on London Clay which provide habitats for rich communities of breeding birds. This is one of the most important sites in the county for invertebrates, including a threatened beetle, Rhizophagus oblongicollis and three nationally rare species, the beetle Bibloporus minutus and the flies Ctenophora bimaculata and Oedalea apicalis.
Esher Commons	Esher Commons	✓		360.8 hectares (892 acres)	YES	Esher; 51.348°N 0.376°W; TQ 132 622	LNR	Map	Citation	More than 2,000 species of insects have been recorded on this site, many of which are nationally rare or scarce, although some have probably been lost due to recent reductions in the area of heath. However, there is still an outstanding community of invertebrates, and rare species include the water beetle Graphoderus cinereus, the ladybird Coccinella distincta and the bark beetle Platypus cylindrus.
Glover's Wood	Glover's Wood	✓		74.5 hectares (184 acres)	YES	Horley; 51.152°N 0.246°W; TQ 228 407	NCR	Map	Citation	This semi-natural broadleaved wood has a very rich ground flora, including dog's mercury, yellow archangel, ramsons and woodland buttercup. The insect fauna has not been well studied, but it is known that there are some rare craneflies such as Molophilus lackschewitzianus.
Godstone Ponds	Godstone Ponds	✓		123.6 hectares (305 acres)	PP	Godstone; 51.244°N 0.059°W; TQ 356 512	SWT	Map	Citation	The three ponds on this site have been created by damming, with the oldest, Leigh Mill Pond, estimated to be around 1,500 years old. There are also areas of wet alder woodland, and 54 species of breeding birds have been recorded. The site is also important for invertebrates, especially craneflies.
Gong Hill	Gong Hill	✓		5.9 hectares (15 acres)	NO	Farnham; 51.183°N 0.788°W; SU 848 433		Map	Citation	This heathland site is dominated by ling, bell heather and wavy hair-grass, with other plants including bryophytes and lichens. The south facing aspect of the site and patches of bare sand make it suitable for egg-laying reptiles, including a large population of the endangered and specially protected sand lizard.
Hackhurst and White Downs	Hackhurst Downs	✓		185.1 hectares (457 acres)	YES	Dorking; 51.230°N 0.402°W; TQ 117 491	LNR, NCR, SWT	Map	Citation	This steeply sloping site is part of the North Downs escarpment, which has grassland, secondary woodland and scrub. It has a rich invertebrate fauna with forty species of butterfly, including adonis blue, chalkhill blue, brown hairstreak, Duke of Burgundy fritillary, marbled white and silver-spotted skipper.
Hankley Farm	Hankley Farm	✓	NO	2.4 hectares (5.9 acres)	NO	Godalming; 51.184°N 0.728°W; SU 890 435		Map	Citation	This sandy arable field has been designated an SSSI because of its large population of a nationally endangered plant, red-tipped cudweed. This was formerly a common weed on arable fields, but it has been in sharp decline since the 1960s. The colonies in the site and neighbouring fields may represent as much as 50% of the British population.
Hedgecourt	Hedgecourt	✓		33.6 hectares (83 acres)	YES	East Grinstead; 51.146°N 0.064°W; TQ 355 403	SWT	Map	Citation	Hedgecourt Lake is an ancient mill pond formed by damming the Eden Brook. Other habitats are fen, grassland and woodland. There are wetland breeding birds such as water rail, mute swan, sedge warbler, kingfisher and tufted duck.
Horsell Common	Horsell Common	✓		152.0 hectares (376 acres)	YES	Woking; 51.336°N 0.563°W; TQ 002 606	SPA	Map	Citation	This site on the Bagshot Beds has diverse fauna and flora characteristic of heathland areas. It is one of the richest places in the county for bees, wasps and ants, with 163 species recorded, including 15 spider-hunting wasps, the potter wasp and the European wool carder bee.
Kempton Park Reservoirs	Kempton Park Reservoirs	✓		25.3 hectares (63 acres)	NO	Feltham; 51.423°N 0.392°W; TQ 119 706	Ramsar, SPA	Map (Note: This site is partly in Greater London)	Citation	Waders that breed regularly include northern lapwing, common redshank, ringed plover and little ringed plover. The first successful inland breeding in the British Isles of pied avocet was at this reservoir. Other birds recorded include smew, garganey, Temminck's stint, spotted crake and red-necked phalarope.
Knight and Bessborough Reservoirs	Bessborough Reservoir	✓		63.4 hectares (157 acres)	NO	West Molesey; 51.400°N 0.393°W; TQ 119 680	Ramsar, SPA	Map	Citation	These reservoirs support many wildfowl, including nationally important numbers of wintering shovelers and substantial populations of gadwalls, cormorants and goldeneyes.
Langham Pond	Langham Pond	✓		26.7 hectares (66 acres)	YES	Egham; 51.438°N 0.560°W; TQ 002 720		Map	Citation	The pond and its surrounding alluvial meadows on chalk represent a habitat unique in southern England. The pond is the remains of an oxbow lake, formed when a meander of the River Thames was bypassed. The pond contains all four British duckweeds, three nationally scarce plants and a species of fly which has been found nowhere else in Britain, Cerodontha ornata.
Leith Hill	Leith Hill	✓		337.9 hectares (835 acres)	PP	Dorking; 51.185°N 0.379°W; TQ 134 441	SWT	Map	Citation	These woods support diverse breeding birds, including all three species of British woodpeckers found in Britain. The invertebrate population is outstanding, with many nationally rare and uncommon species, such as the beetles Notolaemus unifasciatus, which is found on dead wood, Silvanus bidentatus, which feeds on fungus, and the water beetle Agabus melanarius. There are two nationally rare moths.
Lingfield Cernes	Lingfield Cernes	✓		10.3 hectares (25 acres)	FP	Edenbridge; 51.1084°N 0.032°W; TQ 421 447		Map	Citation	This site has unimproved meadows which are poorly drained and there are a number of uncommon plants, including two which are nationally scarce, true fox-sedge and narrow-leaved water-dropwort. The site also has species-rich mature hedgerows and aquatic plants in ditches which run into the Eden Brook, which runs along the northern boundary.
Mole Gap to Reigate Escarpment	Mole Gap to Reigate Escarpment	✓	✓	1,016.4 hectares (2,512 acres)	PP	Tadworth; 51.260°N 0.290°W; TQ 194 526	GCR, NCR, SAC, SWT	Map	Citation	This eight mile long site on the North Downs contains an outstanding range of wildlife habitats, including large areas of woodland and chalk grassland. Mole Gap has a variety of Quaternary landforms and there are well developed river cliffs where alluvial fans have diverted the River Mole against the valley sides.
Moor Park	Moor Park	✓		6.7 hectares (17 acres)	YES	Farnham; 51.205°N 0.759°W; SU 868 458		Map	Citation	This site in the valley of the River Wey is mainly alder carr, which is a nationally rare habitat. It is dominated by alder, with some crack willow. An area of swamp is mainly covered by common reed, with other plants including water-plantain, marsh violet, opposite leaved golden-saxifrage and hemlock water dropwort.
Netherside Stream Outcrops	Netherside Stream Outcrops		✓	2.9 hectares (7.2 acres)	YES	Haslemere; 51.098°N 0.656°W; SU 942 341	GCR	Map	Citation	This is the Type locality for the Netherside Sand Member of the Weald Clay Group, dating to the Lower Cretaceous around 130 million years ago. Upward sloping sandstone has fossil Lycopodites plants in vertical life positions.
Ockham and Wisley Commons	Ockham and Wisley Commons	✓		256.0 hectares (633 acres)	YES	Cobham; 51.318°N 0.456°W; TQ 077 588	LNR, SPA, SWT	Map	Citation	This site is mainly heathland but it also has areas of open water, bog, woodland and scrub. It has a rich flora and it is of national importance for true flies and for dragonflies and damselflies. Rare species include the white-faced darter dragonfly and the Thyridanthrax fenestratus bee fly.
Papercourt	Papercourt	✓		70.0 hectares (173 acres)	NO	Woking; 51.299°N 0.515°W; TQ 036 566	SWT	Map	Citation	This site has a variety of wetland habitats with marshes, unimproved meadows, streams and flooded gravel pits. More than seventy species of birds breed on Papercourt and ninety species winter there. The stream has a rich flora such as greater sweet-grass, reed canary grass and red pondweed.
Puttenham and Crooksbury Commons	Puttenham Common	✓		113.8 hectares (281 acres)	YES	Guildford; 51.207°N 0.697°W; SU 911 461	SM, SWT	Map	Citation	These commons on the Folkestone Beds of the Lower Greensand are surviving fragments of a formerly much larger heath. Puttenham Common has two large pools which have a variety of aquatic plants such as white water lily and the rare eight-stamened waterwort. Crooksbury Common is important for the protected smooth snake and sand lizard.
Quarry Hangers	Quarry Hangers	✓		28.5 hectares (70 acres)	PP	Redhill; 51.267°N 0.112°W; TQ 318 537	SWT	Map	Citation	This sloping site on the North Downs has species-rich chalk grassland, woodland and scrub. Heavily grazed areas are dominated by red fescue and sheep’s fescue, with flowering plants including horseshoe vetch, bird’s-foot trefoil and wild thyme. There is a taller sward in less grazed areas, with grasses such as upright brome and wood false-brome.
Ranmore Common	Ranmore Common	✓		224.3 hectares (554 acres)	YES	Dorking; 51.247°N 0.364°W; TQ 143 510		Map	Citation	This site is mainly woodland, some of it ancient, but there are also areas of heath and rough pasture. The dominant trees are pedunculate and sessile oaks, with a shrub layer of holly, silver birch and yew. There is a diverse community of breeding birds and invertebrates include the satin wave moth and the white admiral butterfly.
Reigate Heath	Reigate Heath	✓		61.7 hectares (152 acres)	PP	Reigate; 51.237°N 0.231°W; TQ 236 501	LNR, SM	Map	Citation	Most of the site is heath and acidic grassland, with some areas of woodland and marshy meadow. One part is a golf course. The heath is mainly ling, bell heather and wavy hair-grass. Marshy meadows have Yorkshire fog, sharp-flowered rush, meadowsweet, wild angelica and marsh marigold.
Seale Chalk Pit	Seale Chalk Pit		✓	1.2 hectares (3.0 acres)	NO	Farnham; 51.225°N 0.714°W; SU 899 481	GCR SWT	Map	Citation	This former quarry exposes rocks of the Hog’s Back, and exhibits the separation of the folding Mesozoic rocks of the Weald from the Tertiary sediments of the London Basin.
Sheepleas	heepleas	✓	✓	99.9 hectares (247 acres)	YES	Leatherhead; 51.253°N 0.441°W; TQ 089 516	GCR, LNR, SWT	Map	Citation	This sloping site on the North Downs has woodland, scrub and botanically rich grassland. The diverse invertebrate fauna includes two nationally rare flies, Norellia spinipes and Microdon devius. A cutting in Mountain Wood exposes a unique gravel Pleistocene deposit which throws light on the Quaternary history of the Weald and the evolution of the London Basin.
Smart's and Prey Heaths	Smart's Heath	✓		39.0 hectares (96 acres)	YES	Woking; 51.292°N 0.586°W; SU 987 557		Map	Citation	These mainly damp heaths are dominated by ling, cross-leaved heath and purple moor-grass. Other plants include creeping willow, dwarf gorse, oblong-leaved sundew, deergrass and round-leaved sundew.
Smokejack Clay Pit	Smokejack Clay Pit		✓	56.0 hectares (138 acres)	PP	Cranleigh; 51.125°N 0.415°W; TQ 110 374	GCR	Map	Citation	This site exposes Lower Cretaceous rocks of the Weald Clay Group. Fossils of six orders of insects have been recorded and an unusual level of details has been preserved. It is the best Weald Clay reptile site, with crocodile teeth, coprolites and part of an Iguanodon. The holotype specimen of the fish eating theropod dinosaur, Baryonyx walkeri was discovered on the site.
Staffhurst Wood	Staffhurst Wood	✓		51.0 hectares (126 acres)	YES	Edenbridge; 51.219°N 0.020°W; TQ 412 486	LNR, NCR, SWT	Map	Citation	This common on Weald Clay has been wooded since the Anglo-Saxon period and past management has left many ancient trees. The canopy is mainly pedunculate oak and the older trees support a rich lichen flora. The moth fauna is outstanding, with six uncommon species.
Staines Moor	Staines Moor	✓		510.8 hectares (1,262 acres)	PP	Staines-upon-Thames; 51.447°N 0.501°W; TQ 043 731	Ramsar, SPA	Map	Citation	Staines Moor consists of the alluvial flood meadows, the King George VI Reservoir, the Staines Reservoirs and a stretch of the River Colne. The reservoirs have nationally important populations of wintering wildfowl and a pond has a nationally important aquatic flora, including one of only three known British localities of the brown galingale.
Stockstone Quarry	Stockstone Quarry		✓	3.9 hectares (9.6 acres)	NO	Farnham; 51.135°N 0.749°W; SU 876 381	GCR	Map	Citation	This site provides the best exposure of the Bargate Beds, a lithological sub-unit of the rocks of the Lower Greensand, dating to around 120 million years ago in the Lower Cretaceous epoch. It exhibits both calcareous and cherty sandstone.
Stones Road Pond	Stones Road Pond	✓		0.5 hectares (1.2 acres)	NO	Epsom; 51.340°N 0.261°W; TQ 212 615		Map	Citation	This deep pond in an urban area has been designated an SSSI because it has one of the largest colonies of great crested newts in England, with 400 to 500 adults during the breeding season. There is also a population of more than 1,000 smooth newts.
Thorpe Hay Meadow	Thorpe Hay Meadow	✓		6.4 hectares (16 acres)	YES	Egham; 51.420°N 0.522°W; TQ 029 700	SWT	Map	Citation	This hay meadow in the flood plain on alluvial gravels of the River Thames has plants which thrive in lime-rich soil. It is surrounded by mature hedgerows and a drainage ditch has five species of willow, including purple willow and almond willow.
Thorpe Park No 1 Gravel Pit	Thorpe Park No 1 Gravel Pit	✓		42.5 hectares (105 acres)	YES	Chertsey; 51.403°N 0.525°W; TQ 027 681	Ramsar, SPA	Map	Citation	This former gravel pit has been designated an SSSI because it is nationally important for wintering gadwall. There are also several other species of wintering wildfowl, such as goldeneyes and smew.
Thursley, Hankley and Frensham Commons	Thursley Commo	✓		1,878.5 hectares (4,642 acres)	PP	Godalming; 51.160°N 0.726°W; SU 892 409	LNR, NCR, NNR Ramsar, SAC, SPA, SWT	Map	Citation	This site is of national importance for its invertebrates, birds and reptiles. It is mainly heathland but the valley mire on Thursley Common is one of the best in the country. Orthoptera include the nationally rare large marsh grasshopper. The site is one of the richest in southern England for birds and of outstanding importance for reptiles, such as the nationally rare sand lizard.
Titsey Woods	Titsey Woods	✓		45.3 hectares (112 acres)	PP	Oxted; 51.269°N 0.034°W; TQ 420 542		Map	Citation	This site is composed of wet semi-natural woods on Gault Clay with diverse ground flora. There are a number of uncommon lepidoptera, including the silver-washed fritillary and white-letter hairstreak butterflies and rose-marbled and alder kitten moths.
Upper Common Pits	Upper Common Pits		✓	3.0 hectares (7.4 acres)	NO	Leatherhead; 51.238°N 0.450°W; TQ 083 499	GCR	Map	Citation	These pits have yielded deposits which are part of the Netley Heath Beds, which date to the Early Pleistocene and are related to the Red Crag Formation. There is a considerable difference in elevation compared with the Red Crag of East Anglia, suggesting differential warping. Near the base there are sandy deposits with many marine fossils.
Vann Lake and Ockley Woods	Vann Lake and Ockley Woods	✓		57.8 hectares (143 acres)	PP	Dorking; 51.138°N 0.353°W; TQ 153 389	SWT	Map	Citation	This site has a lake and ancient woodland which is botanically rich, especially for mosses, liverworts and fungi. There are diverse species of breeding birds and invertebrates include the rare Molophilus lackschewitzianus cranefly and purple emperor and silver-washed fritillary butterflies. There is also a population of dormice.
Wey Valley Meadows	Wey Valley Meadows	✓		94.1 hectares (233 acres)	PP	Guildford; 51.206°N 0.580°W; SU 993 462		Map	Citation	This 4-kilometre (2.5-mile) long stretch of the valley of the River Wey consists of species-rich unimproved meadows. Much of it is maintained by rabbit grazing, but there are also areas wet fen meadow, woodland and scrub. Snipe, lapwing and kingfisher breed on the site.
Whitmoor Common	Whitmoor Common	✓		166.0 hectares (410 acres)	YES	Guildford; 51.273°N 0.591°W; SU 984 536	LNR, SPA, SWT	Map	Citation	This site on the heath of the London Basin has a variety of heathland habitats, as well as areas of woodland, meadow and still and running water. The heath has a nationally scarce spider, Oxyopes heterophthalmus and beetle Hyperaspis pseudopustulata and there are nationally important populations of several bird species.
Windsor Forest and Great Park	Windsor Great Park	✓		1,778.9 hectares (4,396 acres)	YES	Windsor; 51.444°N 0.632°W; SU 952 725	NCR, RHPG, SAC	Map	Citation	This large site has woodland with many ancient trees and large areas of parkland. It is second only to the New Forest for the diversity of its invertebrates, including many Red Data Book beetles and flies. There is an internationally important population of the violet click beetle. The fungi species are very diverse, including some which are extremely rare.
Woldingham and Oxted Downs	Woldingham and Oxted Downs	✓		128.4 hectares (317 acres)	PP	Godstone; 51.270°N 0.038°W; TQ 370 542		Map	Citation	This sloping site on the North Downs has species-rich chalk grassland, woodland and scrub. Common plants in grazed areas include red fescue, sheep’s fescue, quaking grass, yellow oat grass, purging flax, bee orchid, thyme, common centaury and yellow-wort.
Wraysbury Reservoir	Wraysbury Reservoir	✓		205.6 hectares (508 acres)	NO	Staines-upon-Thames; 51.460°N 0.526°W; TQ 025 745	Ramsar, SPA	Map	Citation	The reservoir has nationally important numbers of wintering cormorants, great crested grebe and shovelers. It also supports many gadwalls.

== See also ==
- List of Local Nature Reserves in Surrey
- Surrey Wildlife Trust

== Sources ==
- Ratcliffe, Derek, ed. (1977). A Nature Conservation Review. Vol. 2. Cambridge, UK: Cambridge University Press. ISBN 978-0-521-21403-2.
