= Dwarf furze =

Dwarf furze is a common name for several plants in the genus Ulex and may refer to:

- Ulex gallii, which is also called western gorse
- Ulex minor
