= Blackheath SSSI, Surrey =

Protected area in Surrey, England

Coordinates: 51.204°N 0.516°W

Blackheath
- Site of Special Scientific Interest
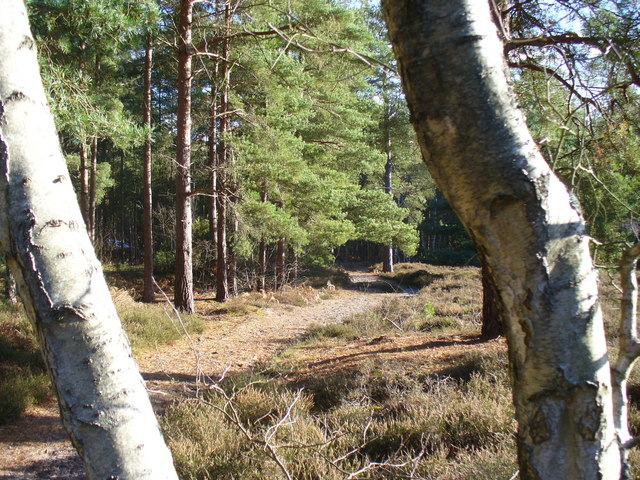
- Location of Blackheath.
- Area of search: Surrey
- Grid reference: TQ 038 460
- Interest: Biological
- Area: 141.6 hectares (350 acres)
- Notification date: 1987
- Location map: Magic Map

Blackheath is a 141.6-hectare (350-acre) biological Site of Special Scientific Interest south-east of Guildford in Surrey.

This area of dry lowland heath and acid grassland is managed for conservation and fauna includes a wide range of breeding birds, the vulnerable heathland spider Oxyopes heterophthalmus and the rare beetle Lomechusoides strumosa. There is also woodland which has a rare moss, Dicranum polysetum.

Blackheath Lane and Littleford Lane go through the site.
