= Glover's Wood =

Woodland in Surrey, England

Coordinates: 51.152°N 0.246°W

- Site of Special Scientific Interest
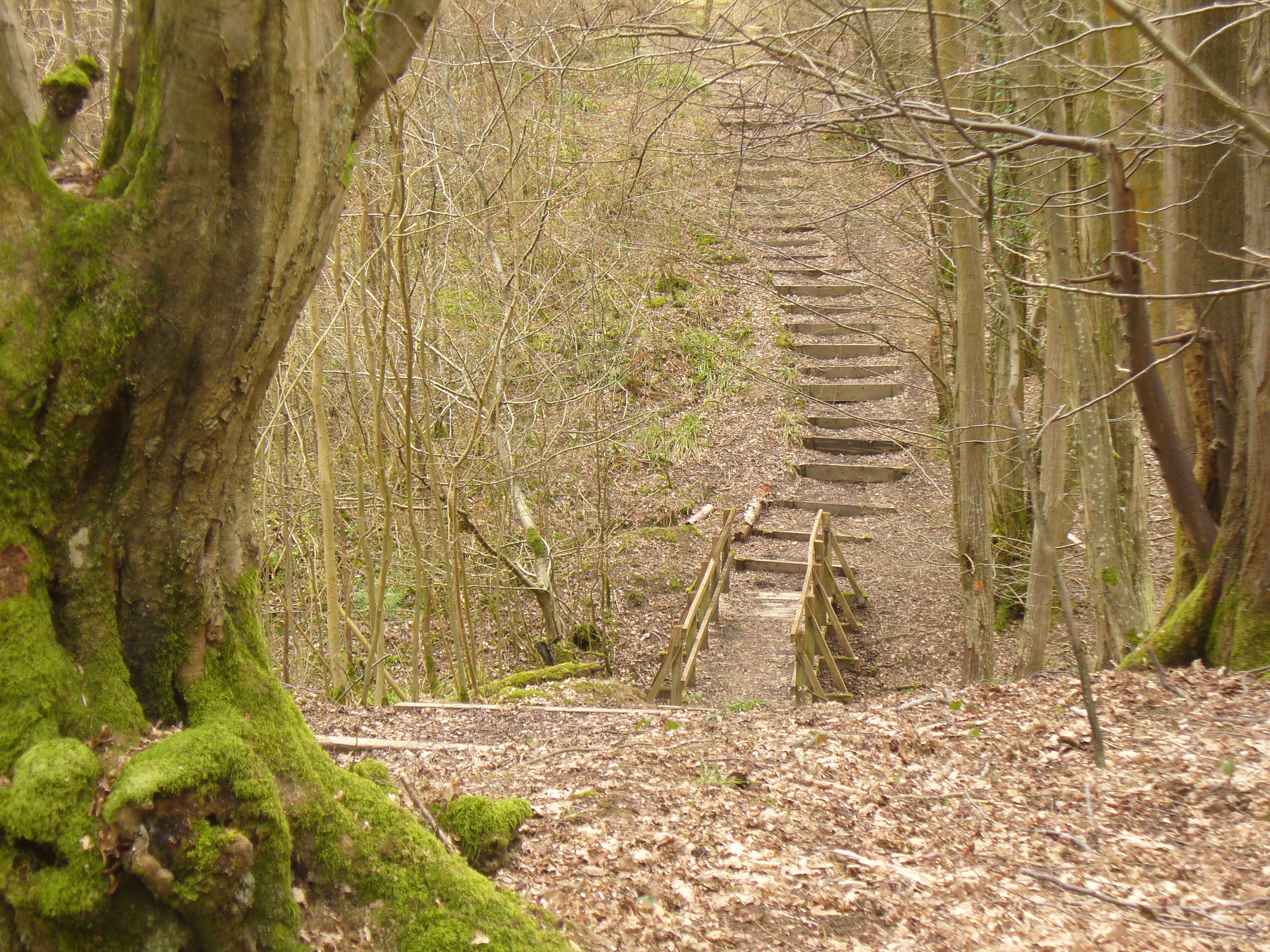
- Location of Glover's Wood.
- Area of search: Surrey
- Grid reference: TQ 228 407
- Interest: Biological
- Area: 74.5 hectares (184 acres)
- Notification date: 1986
- Location map: Magic Map

Glover's Wood is a 74.5-hectare (184-acre) biological Site of Special Scientific Interest east of Charlwood in Surrey. It is a Nature Conservation Review site, Grade 2.

This semi-natural broadleaved wood has a very rich ground flora, including dog's mercury, yellow archangel, ramsons and woodland buttercup. The insect fauna has not been well studied, but it is known that there are some rare craneflies such as Molophilus lackschewitzianus.

The site is crossed by footpaths.
