= Ranmore Common SSSI =

Nature reserve in Surrey, England

Coordinates: 51.247°N 0.364°W

Ranmore Common
- Site of Special Scientific Interest
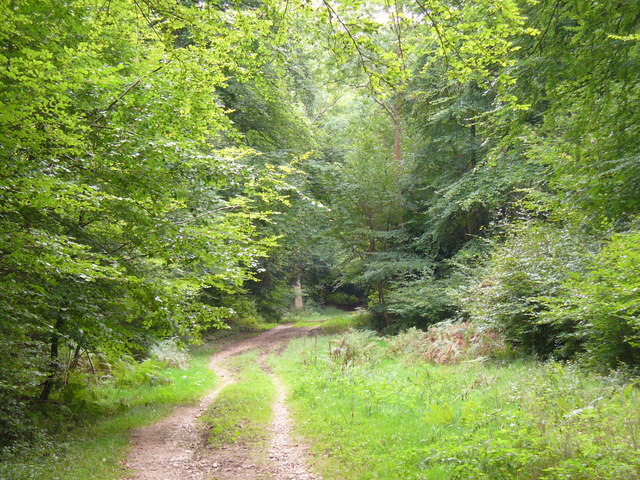
- Location of Ranmore Common.
- Area of search: Surrey
- Grid reference: TQ 143 510
- Interest: Biological
- Area: 224.3 hectares (554 acres)
- Notification date: 1986
- Location map: Magic Map

Ranmore Common SSSI is a 224.3-hectare (554-acre) biological Site of Special Scientific Interest in Ranmore Common, north-west of Dorking in Surrey.

This site is mainly woodland, some of it ancient, but there are also areas of heath and rough pasture. The dominant trees are pedunculate and sessile oaks, with a shrub layer of holly, silver birch and yew. There is a diverse community of breeding birds and invertebrates include the satin wave moth and the white admiral butterfly.
