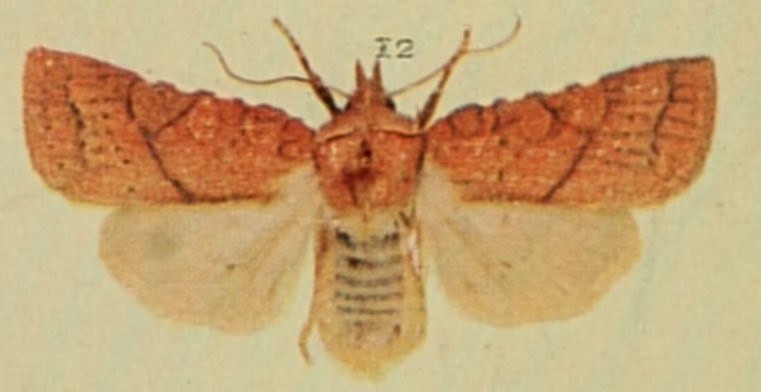
- Jodia croceago

Scientific classification
- Kingdom: Animalia
- Phylum: Arthropoda
- Clade: Pancrustacea
- Class: Insecta
- Order: Lepidoptera
- Superfamily: Noctuoidea
- Family: Noctuidae
- Subtribe: Xylenina
- Genus: Jodia; Hübner, 1818

= Jodia =

Genus of moths

Jodia is a genus of moths of the family Noctuidae erected by Jacob Hübner in 1818.

== Species ==
- Jodia croceago (Denis & Schiffermüller, 1775)
- Jodia sericea (Butler, 1878)
