= Smart's and Prey Heaths =

Protected area in Surrey, England

Coordinates: 51.292°N 0.586°W

- Site of Special Scientific Interest
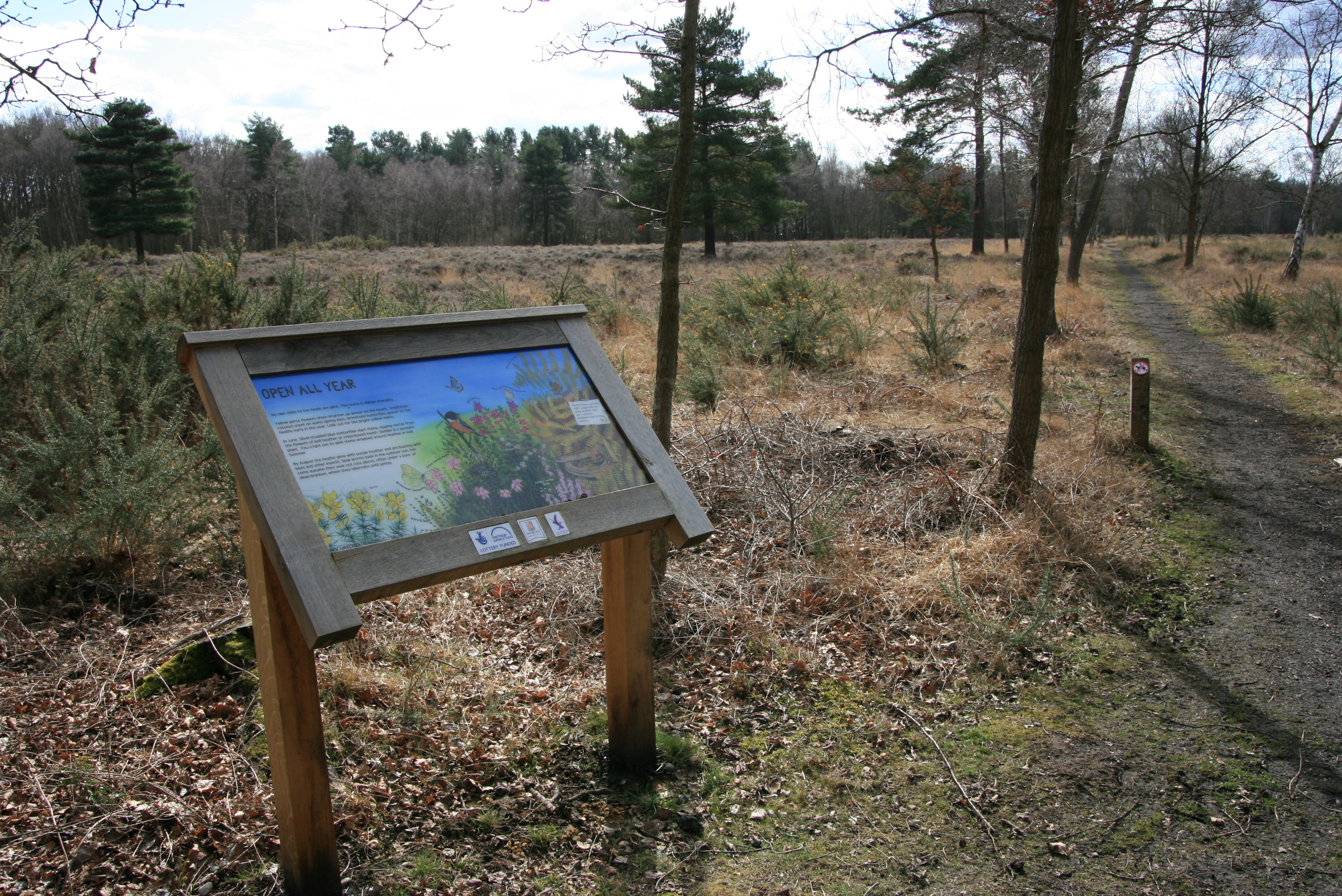
- Location of Smart's and Prey Heaths.
- Area of search: Surrey
- Grid reference: SU 987 557
- Interest: Biological
- Area: 39.0 hectares (96 acres)
- Notification date: 1993
- Location map: Magic Map

Smart's and Prey Heaths is a 39-hectare (96-acre) biological Site of Special Scientific Interest south-west of Woking in Surrey.

These mainly damp heaths are dominated by ling, cross-leaved heath and purple moor-grass. Other plants include creeping willow, dwarf gorse, oblong-leaved sundew, deergrass and round-leaved sundew.

The heaths are crossed by footpaths.
