= Banstead Downs =

Protected area in Banstead, Surrey, England

Coordinates: 51.335°N 0.193°W

- Site of Special Scientific Interest
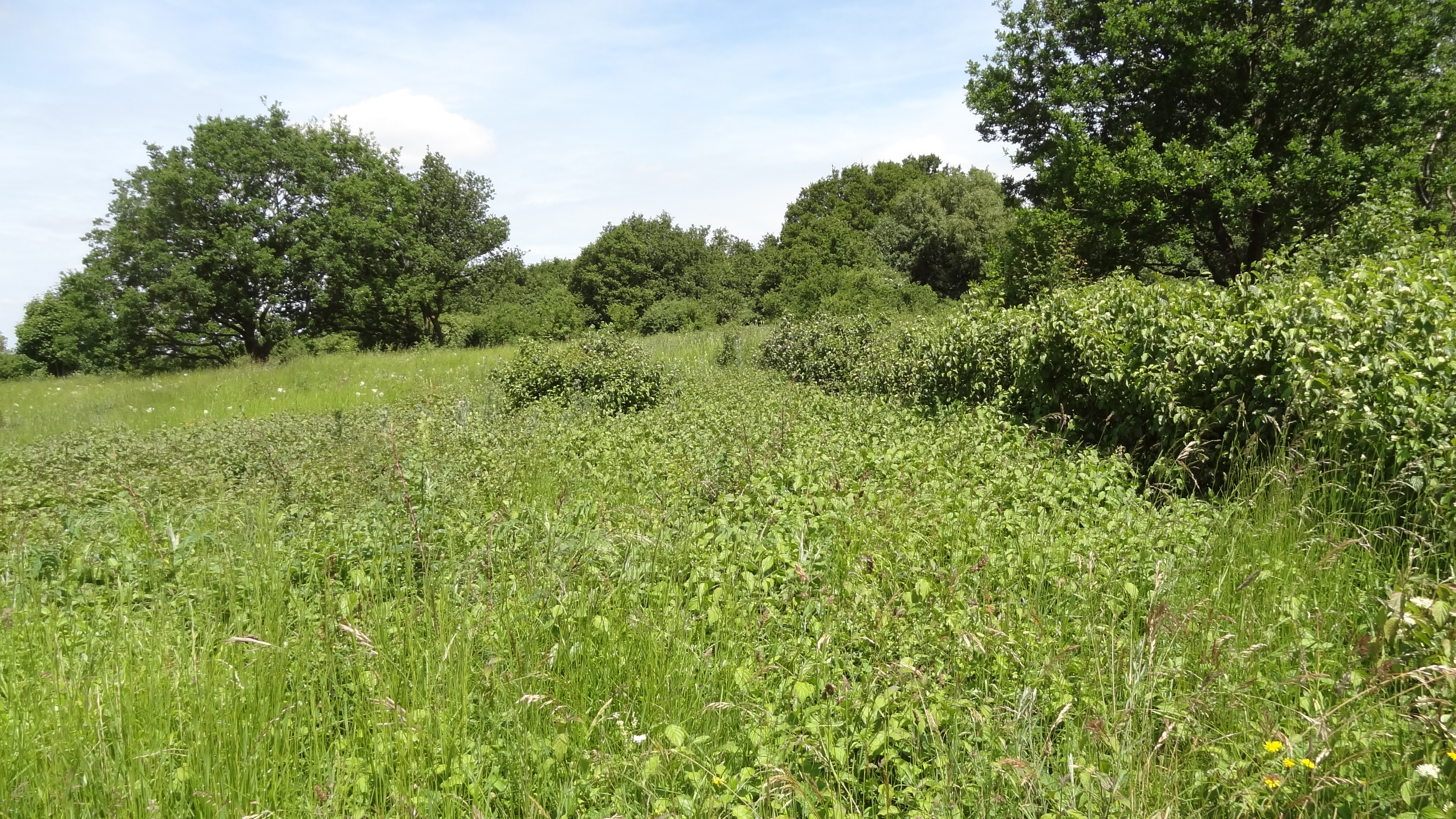
- Location of Banstead Downs.
- Area of search: Surrey
- Grid reference: TQ 252 610
- Interest: Biological
- Area: 126.7 hectares (313 acres)
- Notification date: 1985
- Location map: Magic Map

Banstead Downs is a 126.7-hectare (313-acre) biological Site of Special Scientific Interest in Banstead in Surrey. There are Saxon burial mounds on the site and they are a Scheduled Monument. Today, with wooded areas and wide open fields, Banstead Downs are predominantly used for walks by local residents. The downs also form a pathway from Belmont Village and Brighton Road to Banstead.

== History ==
Archaeological finds on Banstead Downs include Roman and Iron Age pottery and Bronze Age axes. Saxon bowl barrows have been found at the "Gally Hills" site to the west of Brighton Road. The name Gally Hills possibly indicates the former position of a gallows and a gibbet is said to have stood nearby. The northernmost barrow of the remaining Gally Hill barrows was excavated during May 1972, after extensive damage, and was thought to contain the remains of a Saxon warrior. Other secondary burials, in which were found two intact skeletons with dislocated necks, suggest that gallows victims were also buried nearby.

The Downs have long formed a largely open grass chalkland attraction, physically separated since the early 20th century by housing at Burgh Heath from their neighbouring geographical continuation, Epsom Downs. It is a section of the North Downs which is not so eroded or indented as elsewhere on the Downs and marks a relatively abrupt rise of the tall North Downs less than 15 miles (24 km) from the City of London.

...Spacious airy downs,
With grass and thyme o'erspread, and clover wild,
Where smiling Phoebus tempers every breeze,
The fairest flocks rejoice -
Such are the Downs of Bansted, edg'd with woods
And tow'ry villas

— John Dyer (1699–1757), The Fleece, book 1

Banstead Downs are still a wide extent of open land, though much reduced since the time when they made one unbroken expanse with Epsom Downs; the old four mile racecourse ran from a point between Banstead village and the railway station into the present 'straight' of Epsom racecourse. Banstead Downs are recorded in the Domesday Book in 1086, when they were the property of Bishop Odo, the half-brother of William the Conqueror.

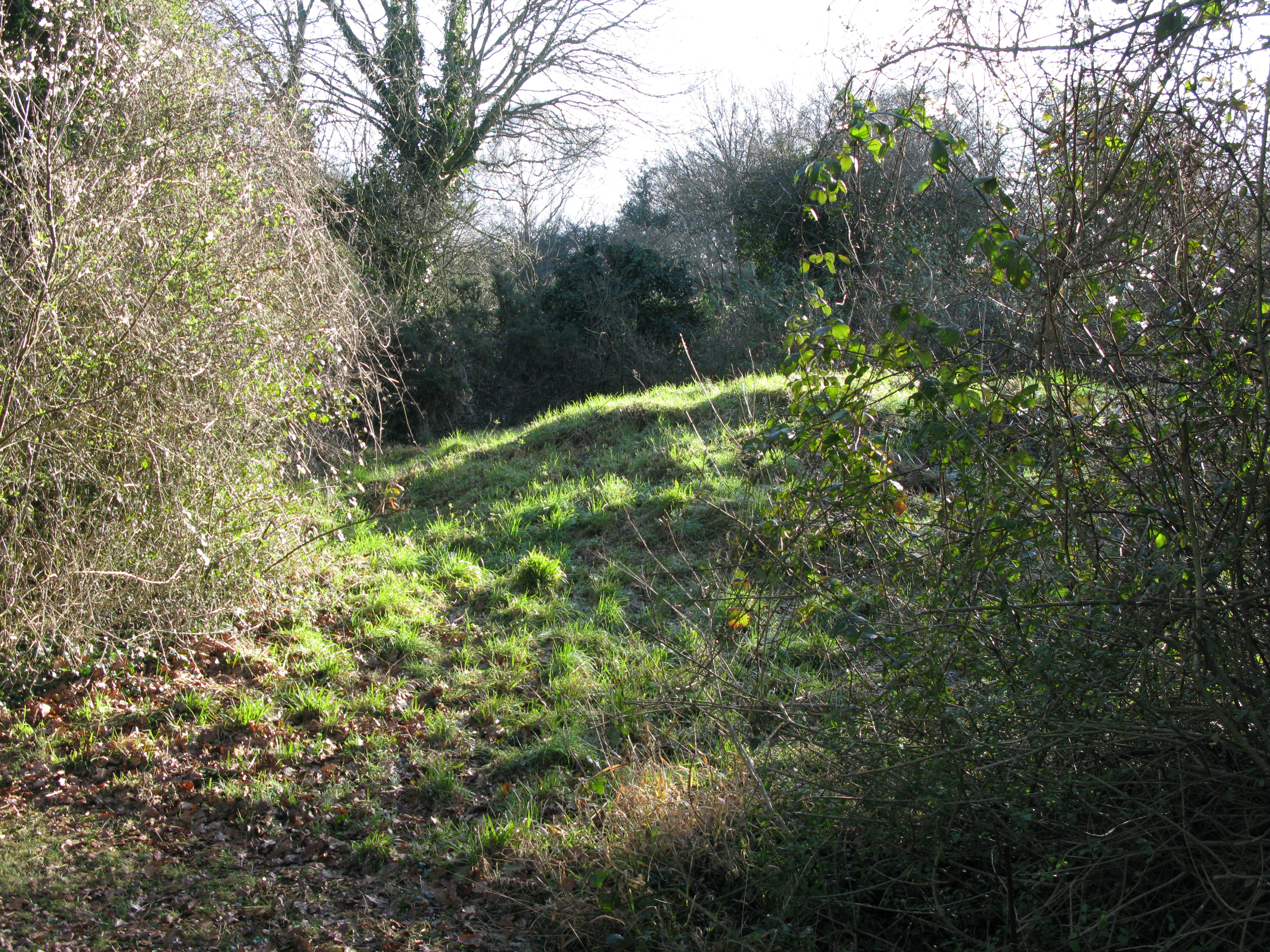
Gally Hills

The Downs, now appropriated chiefly for golf, formerly fed sheep in abundance. The old inn in Banstead village, a building which may well date from the 17th century, is called the 'Wool Pack,' a survival of a past trade. In 1324 the Abbot of Chertsey impleaded John de la Lane, bailiff to Isabella the Queen at Banstead, and others, for taking 1,500 of his sheep at Evesham (Epsom), driving them to Banstead and imparking (i.e. impounding) them, until some died from want of food. The bailiff answered that he took them on Banstead Down by way of distress as the abbot had been impleaded for trespass in the queen's manorial court at Banstead, but had not answered. In the king's court, to which the case was transferred, the abbot obtained damages. In 1338 it was ordered that the officers taking wool for purveyance should exact none from the queen's (Philippa's) manors of Witley and Banstead. The high quality of the wool is shown by a petition of the House of Commons in 1454, in which they prayed that a sack of wool of the growth of Banstead Down might not be sold for less than 100 shillings, as the price of such wool was greatly decayed. The reputation of Banstead Downs for sheep is referred to by Alexander Pope in his Imitations of Horace, and by others.

Historically Banstead Downs were the scene of sport. The sheep-cropped Downs turf and dry chalky subsoil adapted itself admirably to sporting pursuits; vast crowds assembled for foot and horse races, prize fights, wrestling, hawking and hunting. Sutton was the nearest place providing refreshments for animals and man; there was no water on the Downs. Royal horses were stabled at Belmont, where also a range of training stables existed. Nonsuch Palace in the near proximity supplied its quota of royal visitors, and the Royal Hare Warren on the Downs was visited by at least four kings.

When the Earl of Holland's ill-contrived royalist rising of 1648 took place at Kingston, the original plan had included a muster of adherents, as for a horse race, on Banstead Downs. Rumour was rife at the time of such an assembly being formed, and that Holland had marched thither from Kingston. But in fact he had marched to Dorking, and Major Audeley, who was on his track, went over Banstead Downs without finding him or the assembly. The rising had in fact exploded prematurely.

There is evidence of races at Banstead as early as 1625, when the Banstead Downs Plate of £20 value was run on 24 August of that year. A notable footrace was run in 1663, and a famous prize-fight is recorded in 1669. When the great question of the exclusion of James, Duke of York from the succession was before the House of Lords, in 1678, the Duke of Ormonde wrote to Colonel Cooke that he tried to delay the first reading by pointing out the thinness of the House owing to a Dog Match at Hampton Court, and a Horse Match on Banstead Downs. He himself did not attend the Horse Match, where 12 horses ran for 3 plates, 'owners up,' apparently, but he sent a description of it. Two horses fell, one nearly killing his jockey, and it was reported that "the Duke of Monmouth escaped narrowly," so apparently he was also riding.

Hares and partridges were also preserved on the Downs. Henry Saunders was made keeper of a portion of the Downs at £30 a year under The Protectorate, as a reward for trying to seize a highwayman, and in 1668 a gamekeeper was appointed by the Duchy of Lancaster, at the same salary, to preserve hares and partridges. In 1669 the King (Charles II) was hawking there, it not being then the custom to shoot partridges.

The Downs were also used as a muster-place for the Surrey Militia in 1670, when an inspection of the troops was made by the King and Prince Rupert. The formation of a camp of the regular army under the Duke of York or the Duke of Monmouth was discussed in 1678, but it is uncertain whether the plan was carried out.

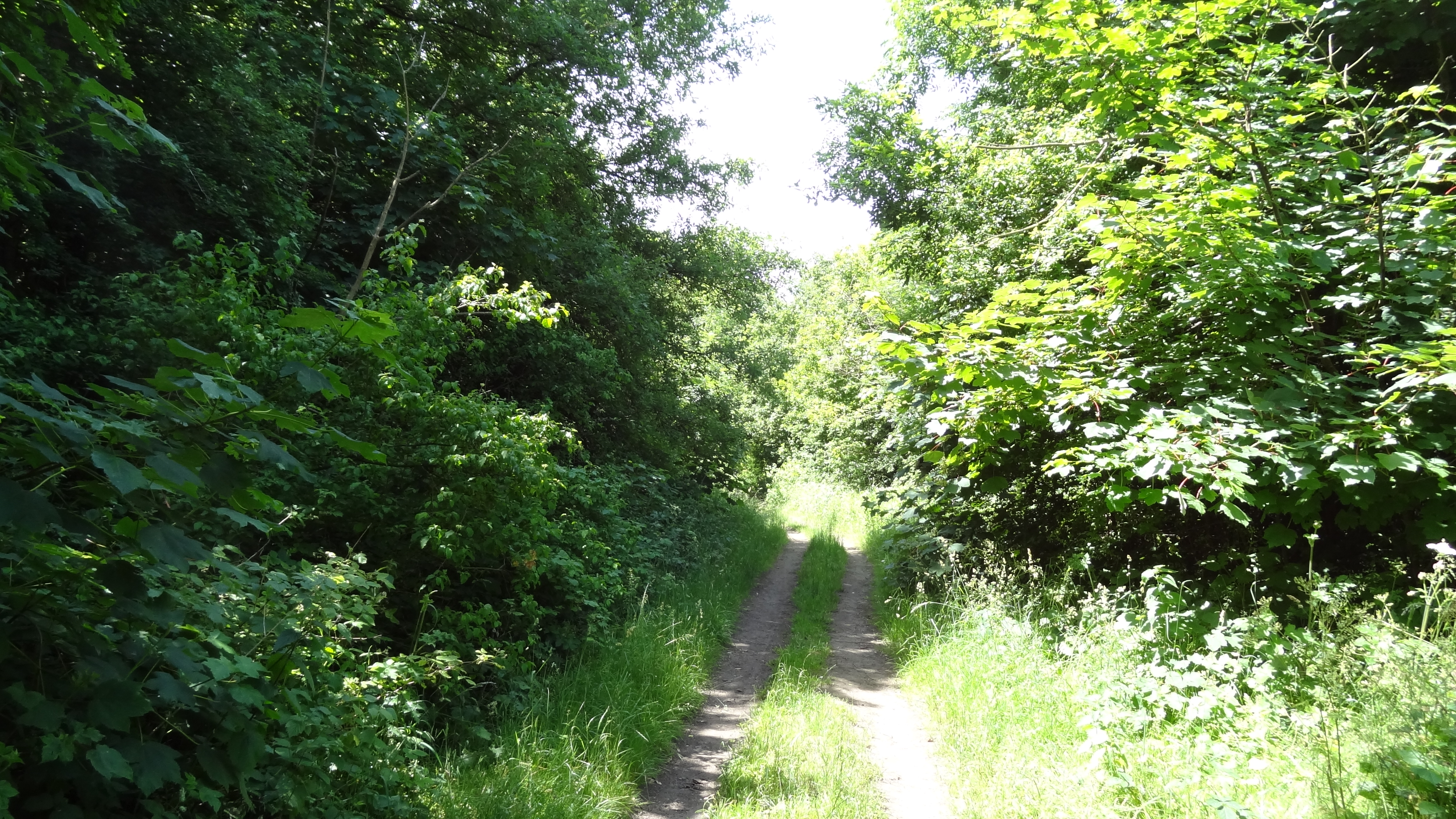
Track on Banstead Downs

During the 17th and 18th centuries, Banstead Downs gained notoriety for the number of highwaymen who lurked there to attack wealthy people enjoying the Downs, attending the races, going to the fashionable spa town of Epsom or travelling from London to Brighton. In July 1731, The Grub-Street Journal reported:

On tuesday Miss Worsley, Niece to the Lady Scawen, being out on Banstead Downs in an open Chaise, having a footman on horseback following, was attacked by one Highwayman, who shew'd his pistol after the usual greeting: the footman was disabled by the fright, but the young Lady struck at him with her whip several times, and company coming up, he thought fit to march off without any booty.

In another account of a more successful robbery from May 1735:

Last week, in the dusk of the Evening, a Gentleman and his Lady going down to Betchworth in Surrey in a Coach, were stopt in Potter's Lane, between Banstead Downs and Walton Heath, by a single Highwayman, who threatened to shoot the Coachman if he stirred, and robbed the Gentleman of a Silver Watch and some Money, and then rode off with his Booty in a great hurry.

== Features ==
The Downs is one of four green areas in the area, which are overall referred to as Banstead Commons. The other areas are Burgh Heath (87 acres), Banstead Heath (760 acres) and Park Downs (74 acres). These areas were the focus of a protracted legal battle in the 19th century.

Banstead Downs is home to the rare small blue butterfly.

== See also ==
- List of Sites of Special Scientific Interest in Surrey
