= Jodia sericea =

Scientific classification
- Domain: Eukaryota
- Kingdom: Animalia
- Phylum: Arthropoda
- Class: Insecta
- Order: Lepidoptera
- Superfamily: Noctuoidea
- Family: Noctuidae
- Genus: Jodia
- Species: J. sericea

Binomial name
- Jodia sericea (Butler, 1878)

Synonyms
- Hoporina sericea Butler, 1878

Species of moth

Jodia sericea is a moth of the family Noctuidae. It is found in China, Japan (Hokkaido, Honshu, Shikoku), the Russian Far East (Primorye, Khabarovsk, Amur region) and the Korean Peninsula.
