= Bay Pond =

Nature reserve in Surrey, England

Coordinates: 51.248°N 0.064°W

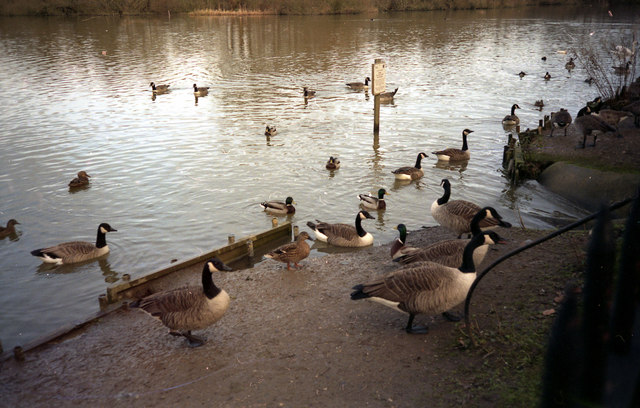
- Interactive map of Bay Pond
- Type: Nature reserve
- Location: Godstone, Surrey
- OS grid: TQ352516
- Area: 7 hectares (17 acres)
- Manager: Surrey Wildlife Trust

Bay Pond is a 7-hectare (17-acre) nature reserve in Godstone in Surrey. It is managed by the Surrey Wildlife Trust. It is part of Godstone Ponds Site of Special Scientific Interest

Bay Pond has no public access, and is an educational reserve run by the Trust. It has four ponds and the main one is believed to have been made in 1611 to hold back water for a mill. Other habitats are wildflower meadows and a mature alder swamp. Butterflies include Gatekeeper, ringlet, small skipper and orange tip.
