= Upper Common Pits =

Protected area in Surrey, England

Coordinates: 51.238°N 0.450°W

- Site of Special Scientific Interest
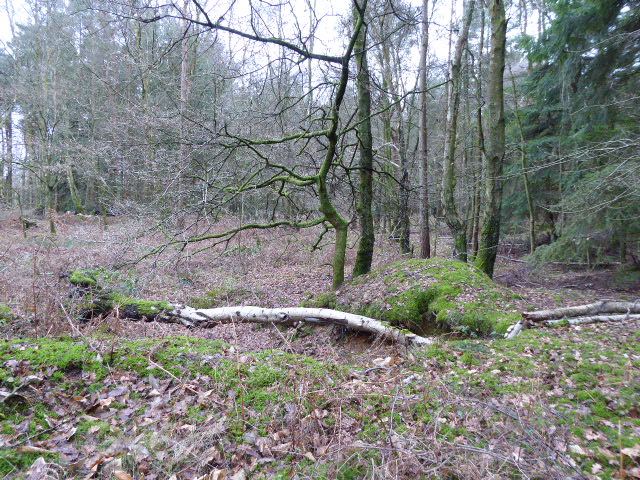
- Location of Upper Common Pits.
- Area of search: Surrey
- Grid reference: TQ 083 499
- Interest: Geological
- Area: 3.0 hectares (7.4 acres)
- Notification date: 1992
- Location map: Magic Map

Upper Common Pits is a 3-hectare (7.4-acre) geological Site of Special Scientific Interest in the north of Gomshall in Surrey. It is a Geological Conservation Review site.

== Overview ==
These pits have yielded deposits which are part of the Netley Heath Beds, which date to the Early Pleistocene and are related to the Red Crag Formation. There is a considerable difference in elevation compared with the Red Crag of East Anglia, suggesting differential warping. Near the base there are sandy deposits with many marine fossils.

The site is private land with no public access.
