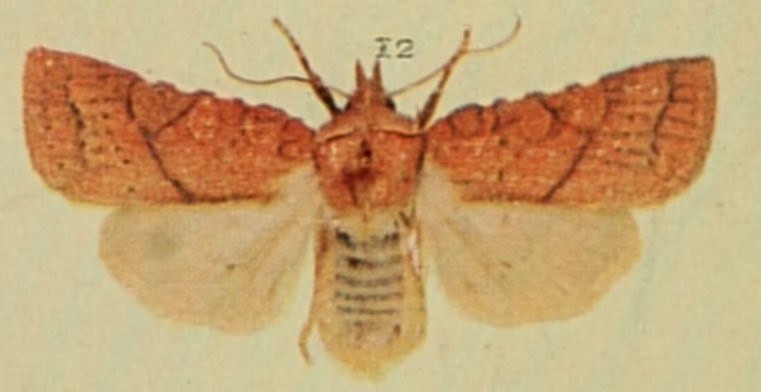

Scientific classification
- Domain: Eukaryota
- Kingdom: Animalia
- Phylum: Arthropoda
- Class: Insecta
- Order: Lepidoptera
- Superfamily: Noctuoidea
- Family: Noctuidae
- Genus: Jodia
- Species: J. croceago

Binomial name
- Jodia croceago (Denis & Schiffermüller, 1775)

Synonyms
- Noctua croceago Denis & Schiffermüller, 1775; Phalaena aurantiago Donovan, 1796; Hoporina croceago var. corsica Mabille, 1868

= Jodia croceago =

Species of moth

Jodia croceago, the orange upperwing, is a moth of the family Noctuidae. The species was first described by Michael Denis and Ignaz Schiffermüller in 1775. It is found in southern and central Europe, to the north up to the southern half of England and Wales. According to Warren. W. in Seitz, A. Ed., 1914 also in Algeria, Asia Minor, and Armenia.

== Technical description and variation ==
X. croceago F. (= aurantiago Don.) (35 f). Forewing dark yellow, thickly irrorated with orange red, in a few instances with blackish dusting; the costa with 4 white dashes in median area; lines generally marked with olive grey, sometimes blackish; inner line pale, waved, edged externally by darker, angled outwards in submedian interval; outer line at 3/4, curved, marked by dark veinspots; upper stigmata large, pale orange, with yellow annuli, the reniform 8-shaped and projecting outwards below cell; median shade broad, dark grey, running from inner margin to outer dark edge of reniform, along which it appears to run, its upper arm from costa above orbicular being more or less obscured and often obsolete, distinct only in the darker orange and black-speckled examples; submarginal line grey, sinuous; veins towards termen often darker; hindwing white, slightly pinkish-tinged, with cellspot and outer line; fringe white; — fulvago Esp. nec L. (35 f) has the orange suffusion deeper, the dark irroration stronger, the upper arm of median shade well-marked; corsica Mab. (35 f), from Corsica, is of a very pale biscuit colour. the irroration and lines very pale olive brownish; the stigmata large and pale, without annuli or centre; hindwing whiter. Larva yellowish grey dotted with dark red;the tubercles white; dorsal line pale, inconspicuous; on segments 4—11 a row of brown V-shaped marks; 11 th segment with a slight hump and two broad white spots behind it; head large, redbrown, pale-dotted. The wingspan is about 35 mm.

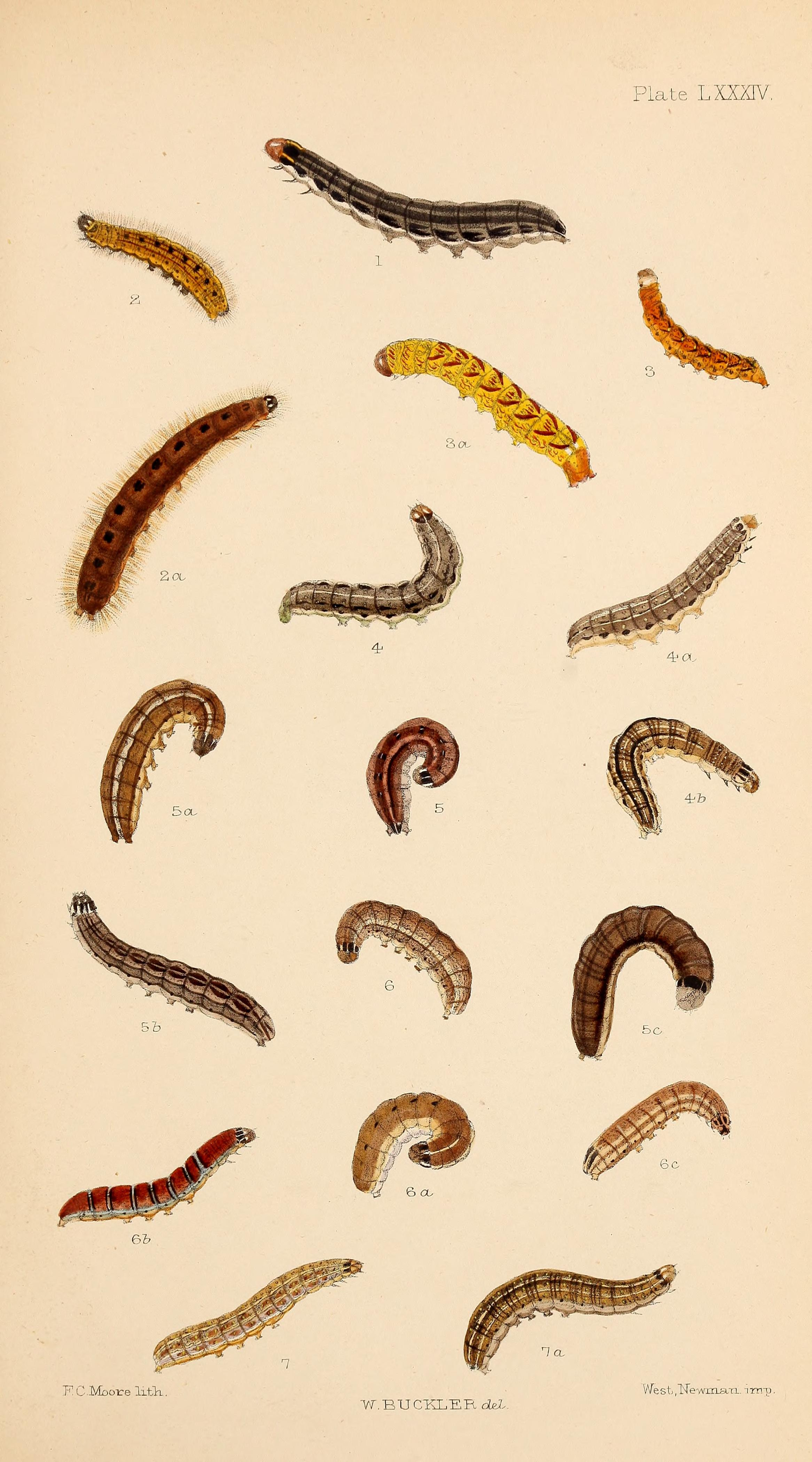
Figs 3, young larva 3a, larvae after final moult

== Biology ==
The moth flies from October to November depending on the location. The larvae feed on Quercus species.

== United Kingdom ==
The species has disappeared from the United Kingdom as a resident species during the first decade of the 21st century.
