= Wey Valley Meadows =

Site in Surrey, England

Coordinates: 51.206°N 0.580°W

- Site of Special Scientific Interest
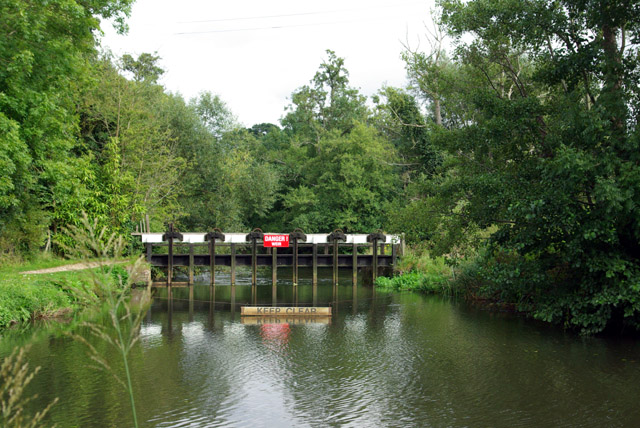
- Location of Wey Valley Meadows.
- Area of search: Surrey
- Grid reference: SU 993 462
- Interest: Biological
- Area: 94.1 hectares (233 acres)
- Notification date: 1991
- Location map: Magic Map

Wey Valley Meadows is a 94.1-hectare (233-acre) biological Site of Special Scientific Interest north of Godalming in Surrey.

This 4-kilometre (2.5-mile) long stretch of the valley of the River Wey consists of species-rich unimproved meadows. Much of it is maintained by rabbit grazing, but there are also areas of wet fen-meadow, woodland and scrub. Snipe, lapwing and kingfisher breed on the site.
