= Gong Hill =

Site of Special Scientific Interest in England

Coordinates: 51.183°N 0.788°W

- Site of Special Scientific Interest
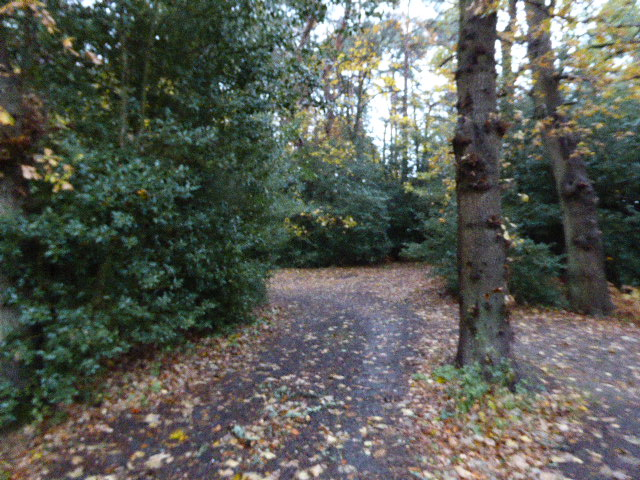
- Location of Gong Hill.
- Area of search: Surrey
- Grid reference: SU 848 433
- Interest: Biological
- Area: 5.9 hectares (15 acres)
- Notification date: 1988
- Location map: Magic Map

Gong Hill is a 5.9-hectare (15-acre) biological Site of Special Scientific Interest south of Farnham in Surrey.

This heathland site is dominated by ling, bell heather and wavy hair-grass, with other plants including bryophytes and lichens. The south facing aspect of the site and patches of bare sand make it suitable for egg-laying reptiles, including a large population of the endangered and specially protected sand lizard.

The site is private land with no public access.
