= Thorpe Park No 1 Gravel Pit =

Protected area in Surrey, England

Coordinates: 51.403°N 0.525°W

- Site of Special Scientific Interest
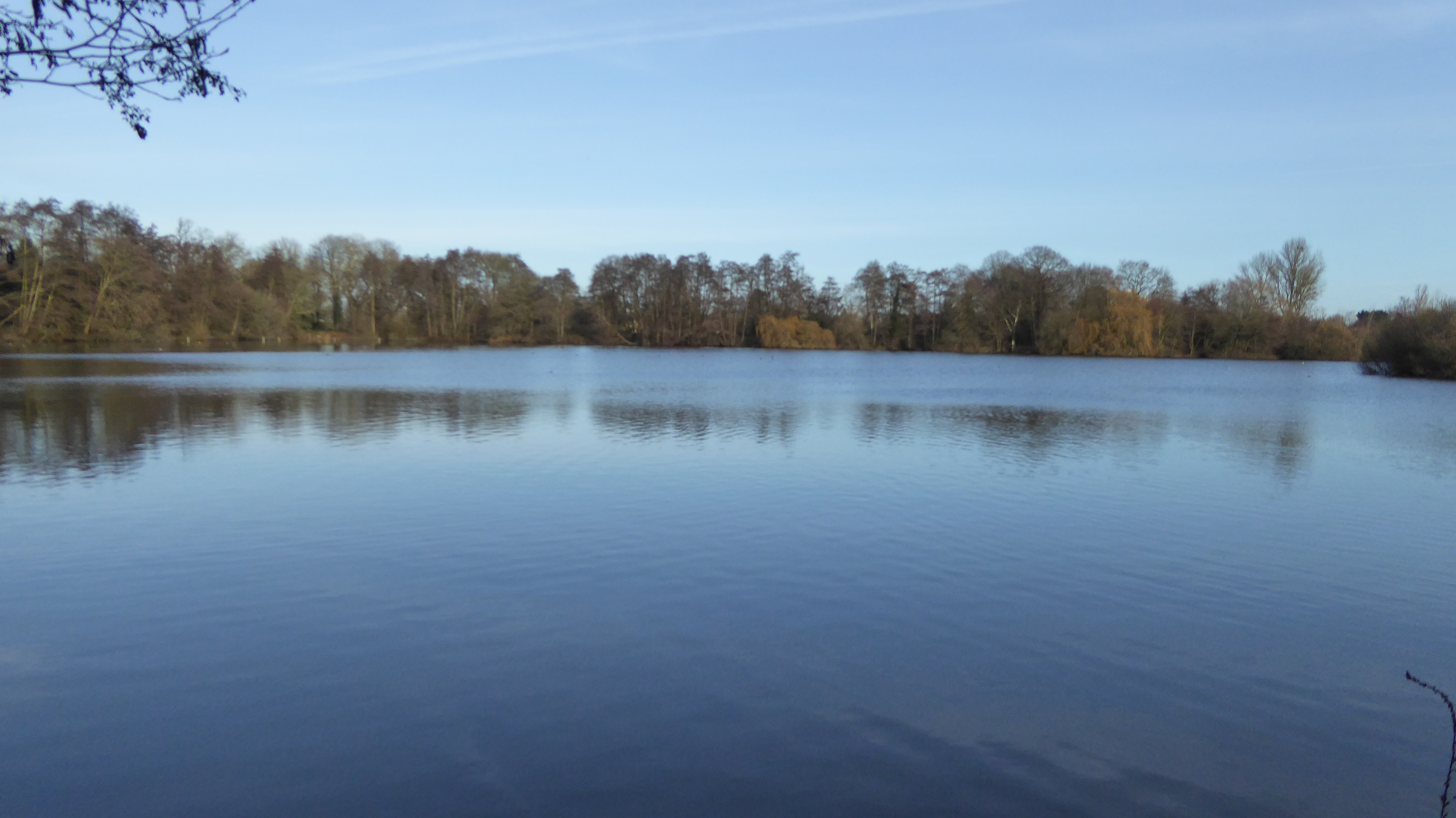
- Location of Thorpe Park No 1 Gravel Pit.
- Area of search: Surrey
- Grid reference: TQ 027 681
- Interest: Biological
- Area: 42.5 hectares (105 acres)
- Notification date: 1999
- Location map: Magic Map

Thorpe Park No 1 Gravel Pit is a 42.5-hectare (105-acre) biological Site of Special Scientific Interest (SSSI) east of Virginia Water in Surrey. It is part of the Thorpe Park theme park.

== Ecology ==
This former gravel pit has been designated an SSSI because it is nationally important for wintering gadwall. There are also several other species of wintering wildfowl, such as goldeneyes and smew.

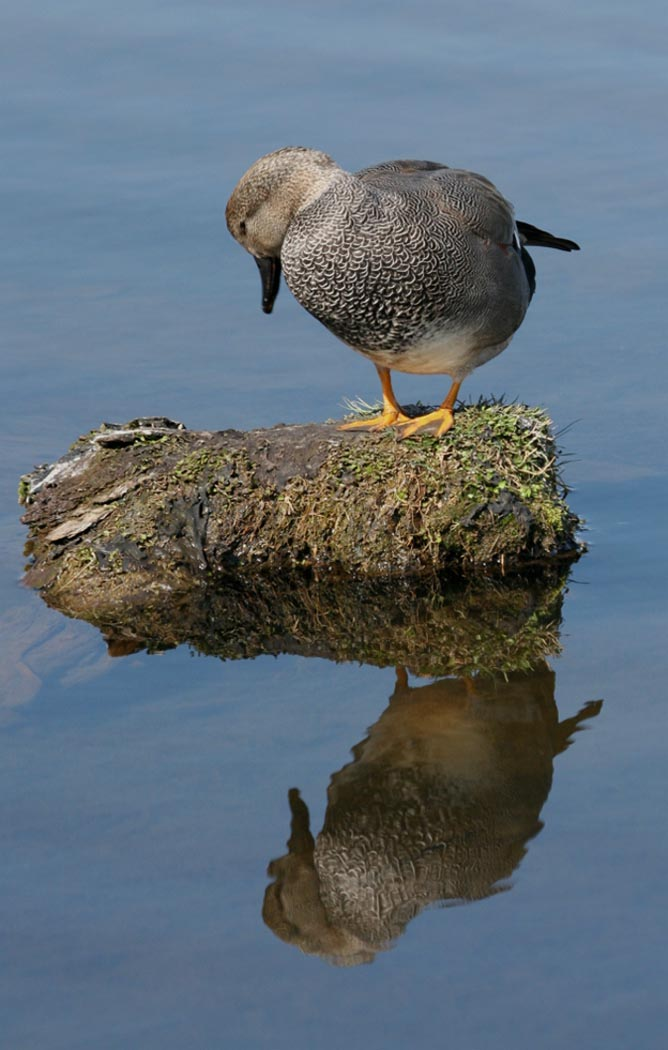
Gadwalls such as this pictured (this example has distinctive male colouring) are not found widely elsewhere inland in England and contributed to the site's listing

== History ==
The gravel pits at Thorpe Park were developed by Ready Mixed Concrete Ltd in the 1930s for the extraction of both sand and gravel for use in construction. They were intentionally flooded in the 1970s when the site was re-purposed for recreational use.

The British Trust for Ornithology noted a Wetlands Advisory Service report of 2003 that suggested recreational activities at the site might have contributed to a decline in recorded gadwall numbers. The site is used for waterskiing but the activity is prohibited between 1 October – 31 March, which is the period when the gadwalls use it for feeding. At other times of the year, the number of participants is restricted.
