= Thorpe Hay Meadow =

Protected area in Surrey, England

Coordinates: 51.420°N 0.522°W

- Site of Special Scientific Interest
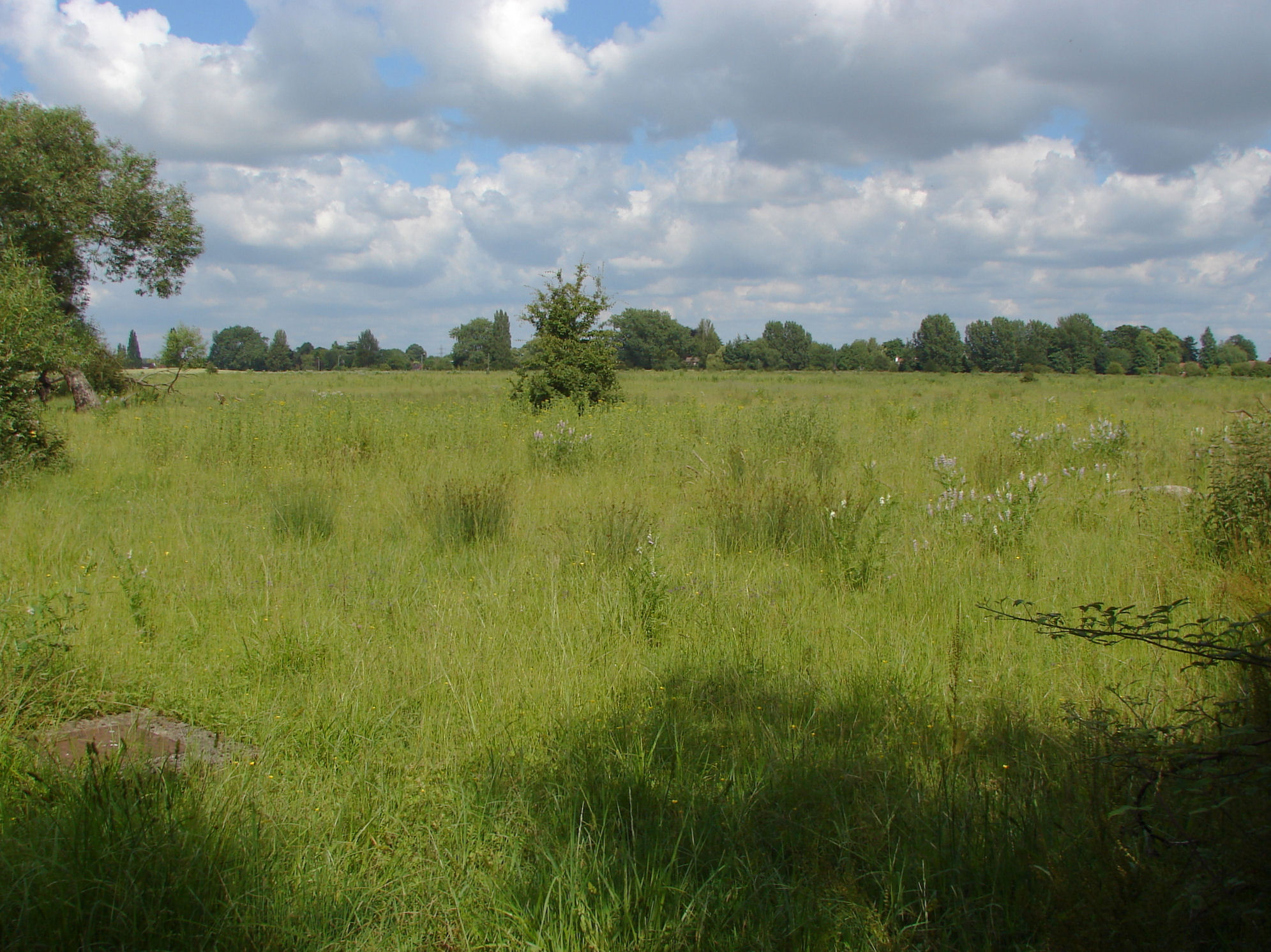
- Location of Thorpe Hay Meadow.
- Area of search: Surrey
- Grid reference: TQ 029 700
- Interest: Biological
- Area: 6.4 hectares (16 acres)
- Notification date: 1985
- Location map: Magic Map

Thorpe Hay Meadow is a 6.4-hectare (16-acre) biological Site of Special Scientific Interest west of Staines-upon-Thames in Surrey. It is owned and managed by the Surrey Wildlife Trust.

Its habitat is (acid-alkali) neutral grassland and it contains Cynosurus cristatus - Centaurea nigra grassland as a notified feature.

The site is thought to be the last remaining example of a Thames valley hay meadow in Surrey. It contains a range of lime-loving (calcicole) plants which are characteristic of this type of meadow. The grassland is dominated by rough-stalked meadow grass Poa trivialis, crested dog’s-tail grass Cynosurus cristatus, and lesser knapweed Centaurea nigra. Yellow rattle Rhinanthus minor, meadow-fescue grass Festuca pratensis, meadow barley Hordeum secalinum, smooth hawk’s-beard Crepis capillaris and common reed Phragmites australis are locally abundant, the last species being unusual in such dry situations. Other frequent species include meadow brome Bromus commutatus, a grass only recorded from one other Surrey location in recent years, meadow foxtail grass Alopecurus pratensis, Yorkshire-fog grass Holcus lanatus, pepper saxifrage Silaum silaus and meadow-sweet Filipendula ulmaria. Associated calcicole species include meadow cranesbill Geranium pratense, clustered bell-flower Campanula glomerata, cowslip Primula veris, hoary plantain Plantago media, salad burnet Sanguisorba minor and lady’s bedstraw Galium verum.

The meadow is surrounded by old hedgerows with a variety of species such as ash Fraxinus excelsior, hawthorn Crataegus monogyna, field maple Acer campestre, spindle Euonymus europaeus, dogwood Cornus sanguinea, and buckthorn Rhamnus catharticus. A drainage ditch along two sides of the site supports five species of willow including purple willow Salix purpurea and almond willow Salix triandra. Common comfrey Symphytum officinale, ragged robin Lychnis flos-cuculi, cyperus sedge Carex pseudocyperus and the uncommon aquatic liverwort Riccia fluitans...along this ditch.

— Species listed in Citation, 1985, Natural England

A footpath from Staines passes through the site.
