= Stockstone Quarry =

Geological Conservation Site

Coordinates: 51.135°N 0.749°W

- Site of Special Scientific Interest
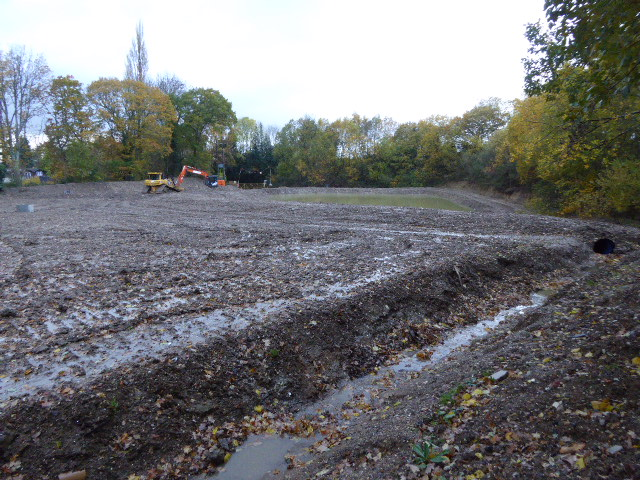
- Location of Stockstone Quarry.
- Area of search: Surrey
- Grid reference: SU 876 381
- Interest: Geological
- Area: 3.9 hectares (9.6 acres)
- Notification date: 1986
- Location map: Magic Map

Stockstone Quarry is a 3.9-hectare (9.6-acre) geological Site of Special Scientific Interest south of Farnham in Surrey. It is a Geological Conservation Review site.

This site provides the best exposure of the Bargate Beds, a lithological sub-unit of the rocks of the Lower Greensand, dating to around 120 million years ago in the Lower Cretaceous epoch. It exhibits both calcareous and cherty sandstone.

The site is private land with no public access.
