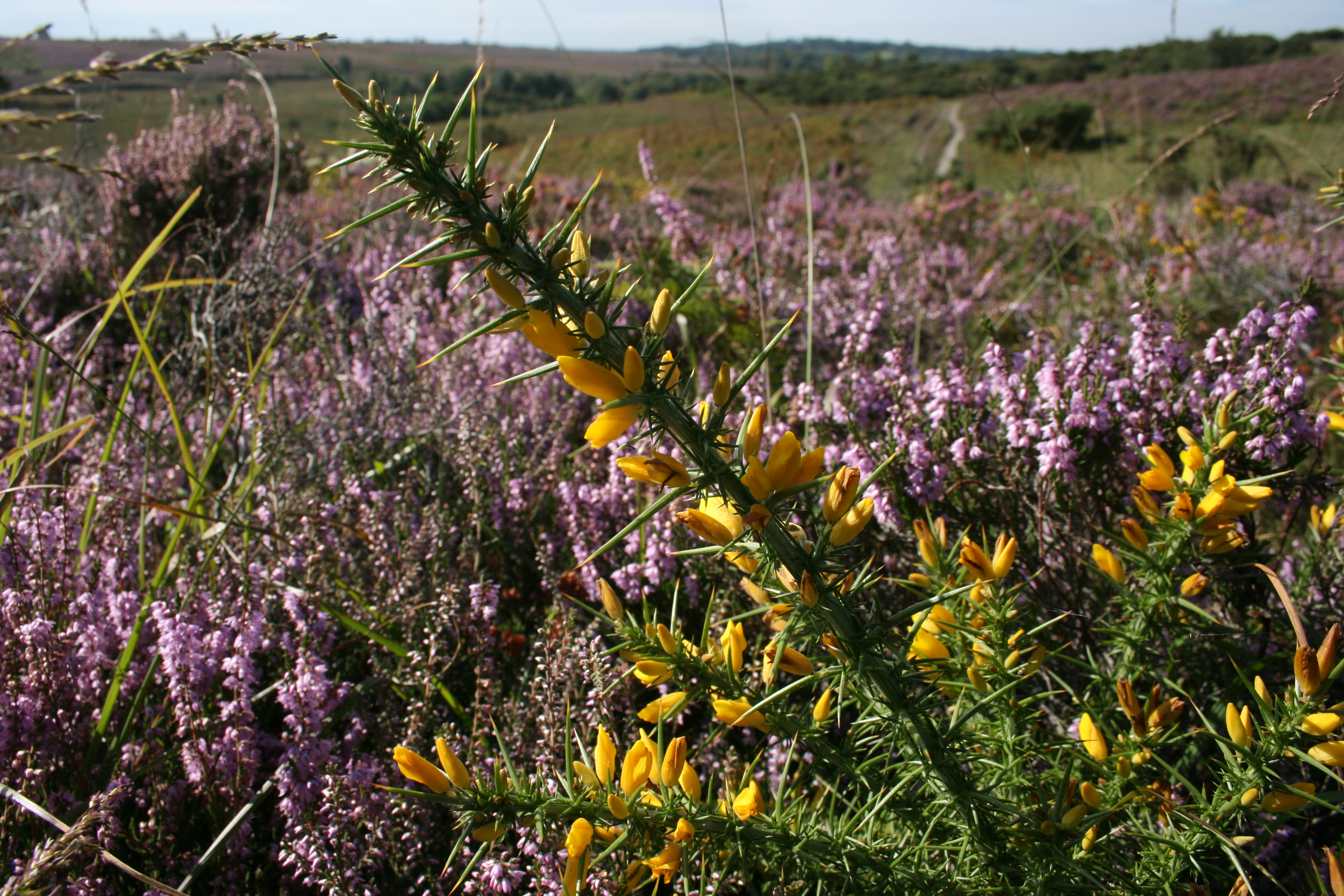

Conservation status
- Least Concern (IUCN 3.1)

Scientific classification
- Kingdom: Plantae
- Clade: Tracheophytes
- Clade: Angiosperms
- Clade: Eudicots
- Clade: Rosids
- Order: Fabales
- Family: Fabaceae
- Subfamily: Faboideae
- Genus: Ulex
- Species: U. gallii

Binomial name
- Ulex gallii Planch.

= Ulex gallii =

Species of flowering plant in the pea family

Ulex gallii, the western gorse or dwarf furze is an evergreen shrub in the pea family (Fabaceae), native to the Atlantic coasts of western Europe: southern Scotland, England, Wales, Ireland, the Isle of Man, western France and the northern coast of Spain.

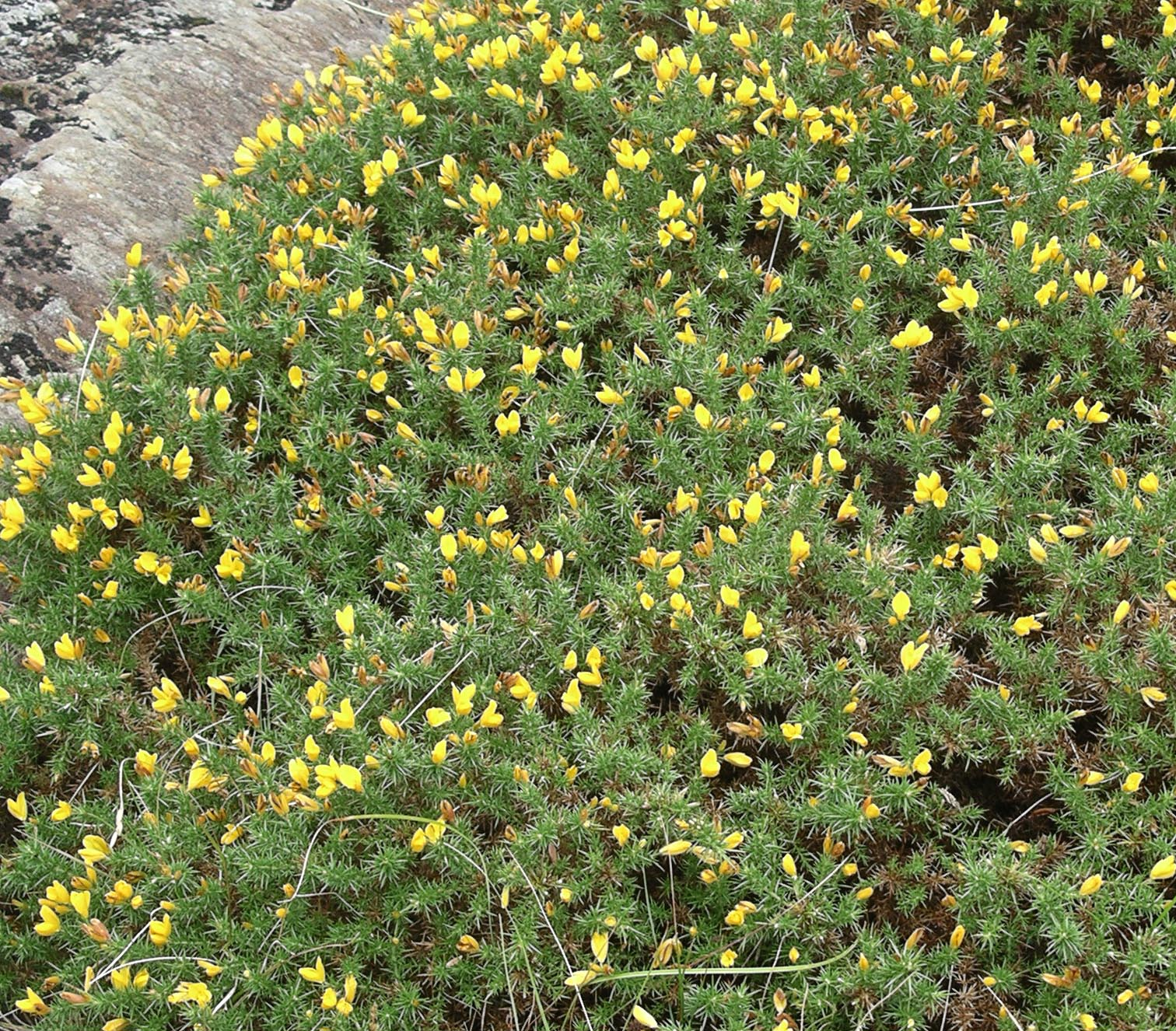
Ulex gallii growing on the flanks of Snowdon

It favours acidic heathy soils and is frequently found in exposed maritime and montane environments. It is more common in the west of its distribution; in eastern England it is replaced in similar habitats by the closely related Dwarf Furze (Ulex minor), with very little overlap in the distribution of the two species.

== Description ==
Ulex gallii is usually 10 to 50 centimetres (4 to 20 in) tall although it may grow up to 2 metres (7 ft). The stems are modified into spines, mostly about 1 centimetre (0.4 in) long, but with some regularly spaced recurved spines of about 3 centimetres (1 in). Like other members of the genus Ulex it has trifoliate leaves as a seedling, but later the leaves are reduced to small scales or spines. The stems are green, and almost wholly replace the leaves as the plant's functioning photosynthetic organs.

The flowers are yellow, 1 to 2 centimetres (0.4 to 0.8 in) long, with the typical pea-flower structure; they are produced principally in the late summer and autumn, rarely before July. The fruit is a legume (pod), partly enclosed by the pale brown remnants of the flower.

Like many species of gorse, it can grow as a fire-climax plant, which readily catches fire but re-grows from the roots after the fire; the seeds are also adapted to germinate after slight scorching by fire.
