= Netherside Stream Outcrops =

Protected area in Surrey, England

Coordinates: 51.098°N 0.656°W

- Site of Special Scientific Interest
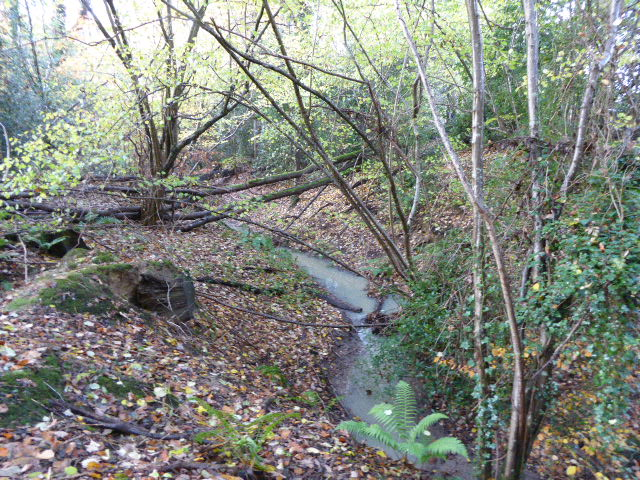
- Location of Netherside Stream Outcrops.
- Area of search: Surrey
- Grid reference: SU 942 341
- Interest: Geological
- Area: 2.9 hectares (7.2 acres)
- Notification date: 1992
- Location map: Magic Map

Netherside Stream Outcrops is a 2.9-hectare (7.2-acre) geological Site of Special Scientific Interest north-east of Haslemere in Surrey. It is a Geological Conservation Review site.

This is the Type locality for the Netherside Sand Member of the Weald Clay Group, dating to the Lower Cretaceous around 130 million years ago. Upward sloping sandstone has fossil Lycopodites plants in vertical life positions.

A public footpath runs through the site.
