= Colony Bog and Bagshot Heath =

Site of Special Scientific Interest in Surrey, England

Coordinates: 51.326°N 0.367°W

- Site of Special Scientific Interest
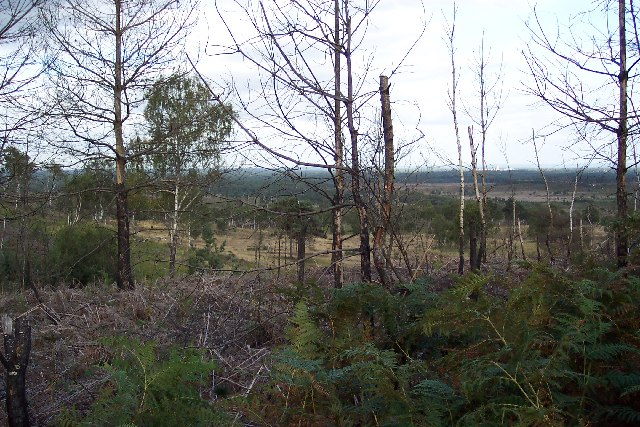
- Location of Colony Bog and Bagshot Heath.
- Area of search: Surrey
- Grid reference: SU 925 594
- Interest: Biological
- Area: 1,130.5 hectares (2,794 acres)
- Notification date: 1993
- Location map: Magic Map

Colony Bog and Bagshot Heath is a 1,130.5-hectare (2,794-acre) biological Site of Special Scientific Interest between Camberley and Woking in Surrey, England. Part of it is a Nature Conservation Review site, Grade I. It is part of the Thames Basin Heaths Special Protection Area and the Thursley, Ash, Pirbright and Chobham Special Area of Conservation. It includes Brentmoor Heath, a Local Nature Reserve which is managed by the Surrey Wildlife Trust

Habitats in this site include wet and dry heath, bog and unimproved grassland. Much of the site is a military danger area and as a result little is known of its rare fauna and flora. Waterlogged areas have a layer of peat with a mass of peat mosses and a diverse bog flora. Areas of open heath provide a habitat for a variety of heathland bird species to breed.
