= Brook Brick Pit =

Coordinates: 51.132°N 0.672°W

- Site of Special Scientific Interest
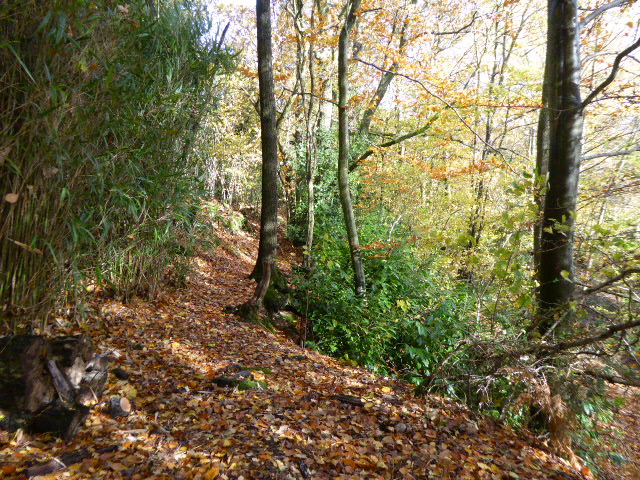
- Location of Brook Brick Pit.
- Area of search: Surrey
- Grid reference: SU 930 378
- Interest: Geological
- Area: 0.9 hectares (2.2 acres)
- Notification date: 1988
- Location map: Magic Map

Brook Brick Pit is a 0.9-hectare (2.2-acre) geological Site of Special Scientific Interest west of Wormley Surrey. It is a Geological Conservation Review site.

This site exposes rocks of the Atherfield Clay Formation, dating to the Aptian stage of the Lower Cretaceous around 120 million years ago. It shows the onset of marine conditions in southern England in the Aptian and it has diverse bivalve fossils.

The site is private land with no public access.
