= Woldingham and Oxted Downs =

Forest east of Caterham, Surrey, England

Coordinates: 51.270°N 0.038°W

- Site of Special Scientific Interest
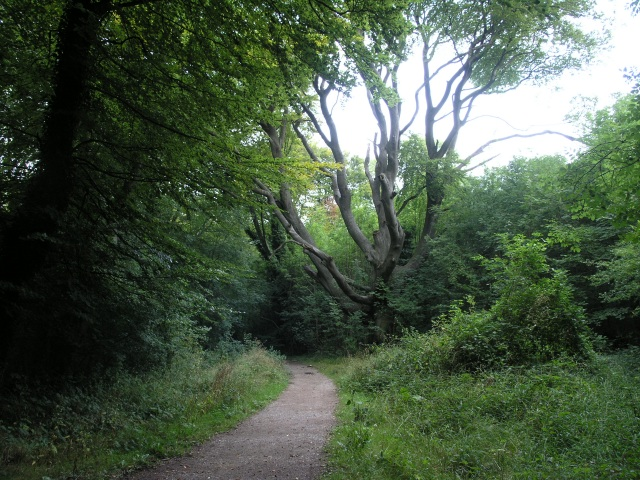
- Location of Woldingham and Oxted Downs.
- Area of search: Surrey
- Grid reference: TQ 370 542
- Interest: Biological
- Area: 128.4 hectares (317 acres)
- Notification date: 1986
- Location map: Magic Map

Woldingham and Oxted Downs is a 128.4-hectare (317-acre) biological Site of Special Scientific Interest east of Caterham in Surrey.

This sloping site on the North Downs has species-rich chalk grassland, woodland and scrub. Common plants in grazed areas include red fescue, sheep's fescue, quaking grass, yellow oat grass, purging flax, bee orchid, thyme, common centaury and yellow-wort.
