= Charleshill SSSI =

UK Site of Special Scientific Interest

Coordinates: 51.188°N 0.721°W

Charleshill
- Site of Special Scientific Interest
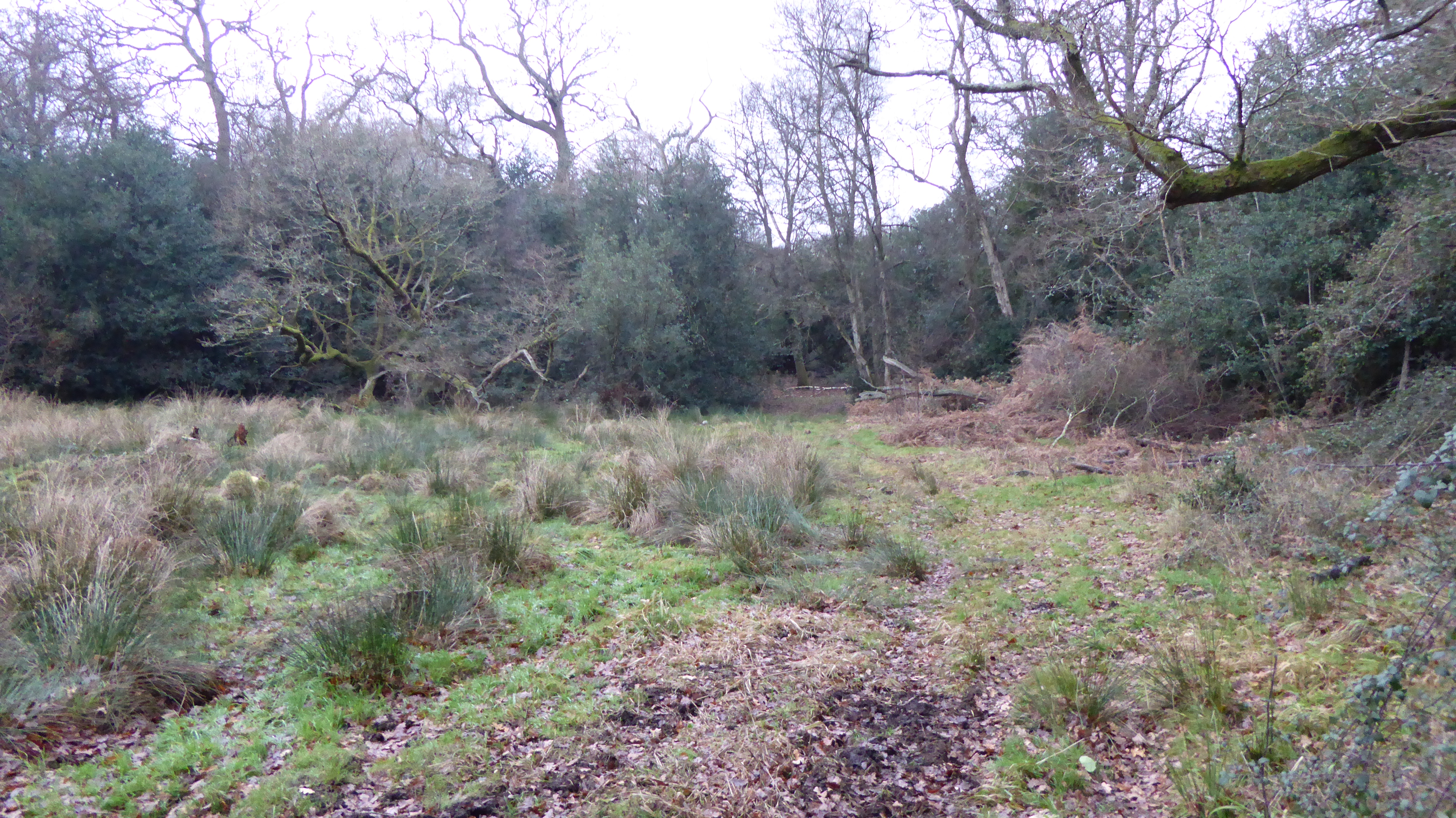
- Location of Charleshill.
- Area of search: Surrey
- Grid reference: SU 895 440
- Interest: Biological
- Area: 10.1 hectares (25 acres)
- Notification date: 1988
- Location map: Magic Map

Charleshill SSSI is a 10.1-hectare (25-acre) biological Site of Special Scientific Interest west of Elstead in Surrey. It is part of Thundry Meadows nature reserve, which is owned and managed by the Surrey Wildlife Trust

This site has wet and dry meadows with a very wet area which has quaking mire. The mire is dominated by bottle sedge, marsh cinquefoil and bog-bean, together with white sedge in the wettest part. There is also some wet woodland.

There is access from Farnham Road.
