= Langham Pond =

Nature reserve in Surrey, England

Coordinates: 51.438°N 0.560°W

- Site of Special Scientific Interest
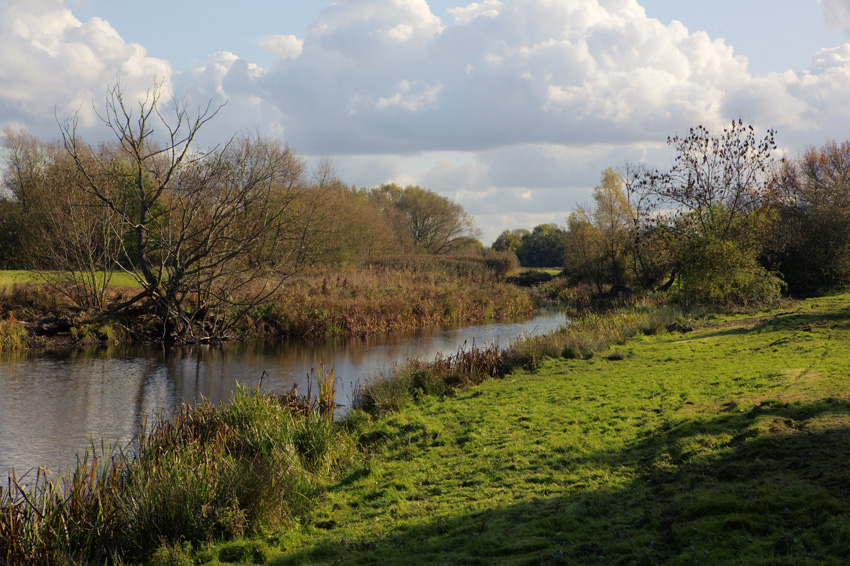
- Location of Langham Pond.
- Area of search: Surrey
- Grid reference: TQ 002 720
- Interest: Biological
- Area: 26.7 hectares (66 acres)
- Notification date: 1986
- Location map: Magic Map

Langham Pond is a 26.7-hectare (66-acre) biological Site of Special Scientific Interest north of Egham in Surrey, England.

The pond and its surrounding alluvial meadows on chalk are a unique habitat in southern England. The pond is the remains of an oxbow lake, formed when a meander of the River Thames was bypassed. It contains all four British duckweeds, three nationally scarce plants and a species of fly which has been found nowhere else in Britain, Cerodontha ornata.
