= Hankley Farm =

Protected area in Surrey, England

Coordinates: 51.184°N 0.728°W

- Site of Special Scientific Interest
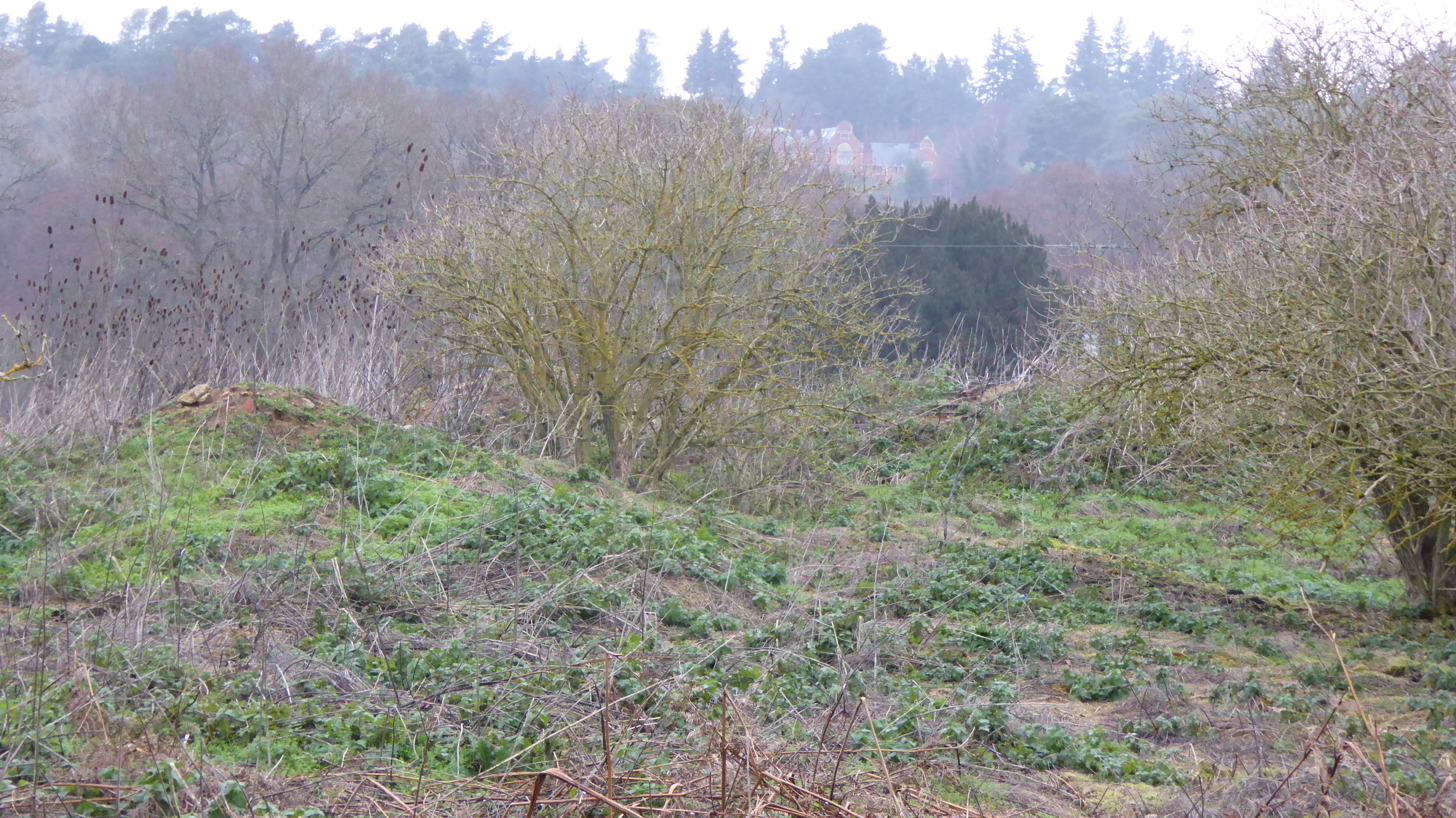
- Location of Hankley Farm.
- Area of search: Surrey
- Grid reference: SU 890 435
- Interest: Biological
- Area: 2.4 hectares (5.9 acres)
- Notification date: 1994
- Location map: Magic Map

Hankley Farm is a 2.4-hectare (5.9-acre) biological Site of Special Scientific Interest (SSSI) west of Elstead in Surrey.

This sandy arable field has been designated an SSSI because of its large population of a nationally endangered plant, red-tipped cudweed. This was formerly a common weed on arable fields, but it has been in sharp decline since the 1960s. The colonies in the site and neighbouring fields may represent as much as 50% of the British population.

The site is private land with no public access.
