= Godstone Ponds =

Pond and nature reserve in Godstone, Surrey, England

Coordinates: 51.241°N 0.056°W

- Site of Special Scientific Interest
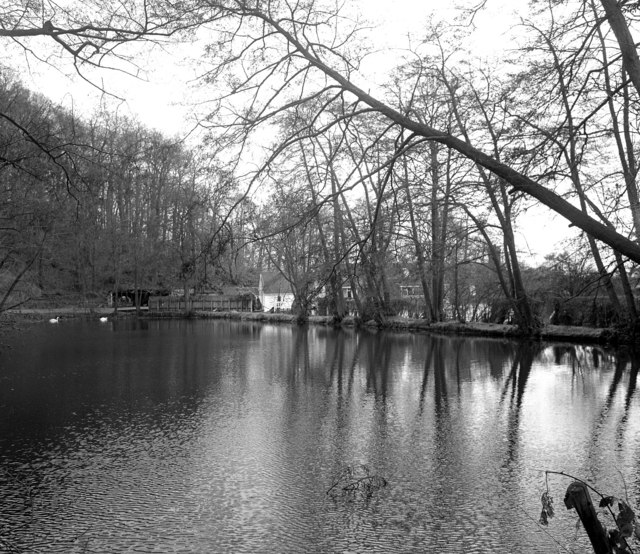
- Leigh Place Pond
- Location of Godstone Ponds.
- Area of search: Surrey
- Grid reference: TQ 356 512
- Interest: Biological
- Area: 13.6 hectares (34 acres)
- Notification date: 1985
- Location map: Magic Map

Godstone Ponds is a 13.6-hectare (34-acre) biological Site of Special Scientific Interest in Godstone in Surrey. Bay Pond is an educational nature reserve closed to the public which is managed by the Surrey Wildlife Trust.

The three ponds on this site have been created by damming, with the oldest, Leigh Mill Pond, estimated to be around 1,500 years old. There are also areas of wet alder woodland, and 54 species of breeding birds have been recorded. The site is also important for invertebrates, especially craneflies.
