= Staffhurst Wood =

Woodland in Surrey, England

Coordinates: 51.219°N 0.020°E

- Site of Special Scientific Interest
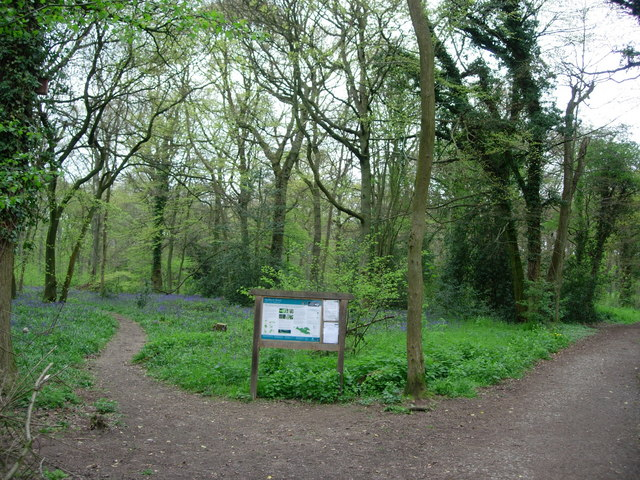
- Location of Staffhurst Wood.
- Area of search: Surrey
- Grid reference: TQ 412 486
- Interest: Biological
- Area: 51.0 hectares (126 acres)
- Notification date: 1986
- Location map: Magic Map

Staffhurst Wood is a 51-hectare (130-acre) biological Site of Special Scientific Interest south of Oxted in Surrey. It is a Nature Conservation Review site, Grade 2. An area of 38.1 hectares (94 acres) is a Local Nature Reserve, which is owned by Surrey County Council.

This common on Weald Clay has been wooded since the Anglo-Saxon period and past management has left many ancient trees. The canopy is mainly pedunculate oak and the older trees support a rich lichen flora. The moth fauna is outstanding, with six uncommon species.

There is access from Staffhurst Wood Road.
