= Stones Road Pond =

Protected area in Surrey, England

Coordinates: 51.340°N 0.261°W

- Site of Special Scientific Interest
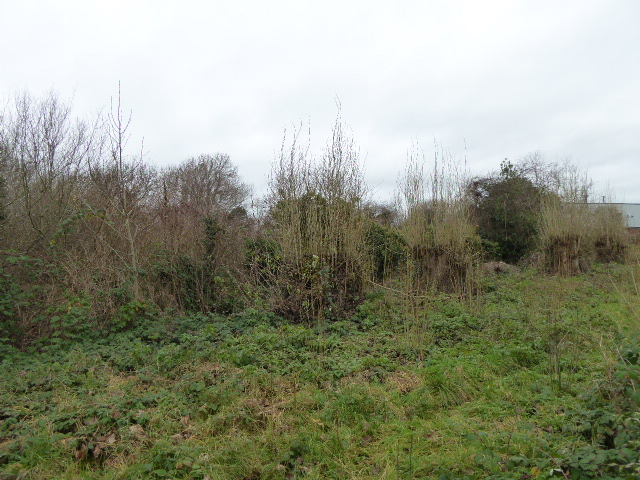
- Location of Stones Road Pond.
- Area of search: Surrey
- Grid reference: TQ 212 615
- Interest: Biological
- Area: 0.5 hectares (1.2 acres)
- Notification date: 1985
- Location map: Magic Map

Stones Road Pond is a 0.5-hectare (1.2-acre) biological Site of Special Scientific Interest (SSSI) in Epsom in Surrey.

This deep pond in an urban area has been designated an SSSI because it has one of the largest colonies of great crested newts in England, with 400 to 500 adults during the breeding season. There is also a population of more than 1,000 smooth newts.

The site is private land with no public access.

== Land ownership ==
All land in Stones Road Pond SSSI is owned by the local authority.
