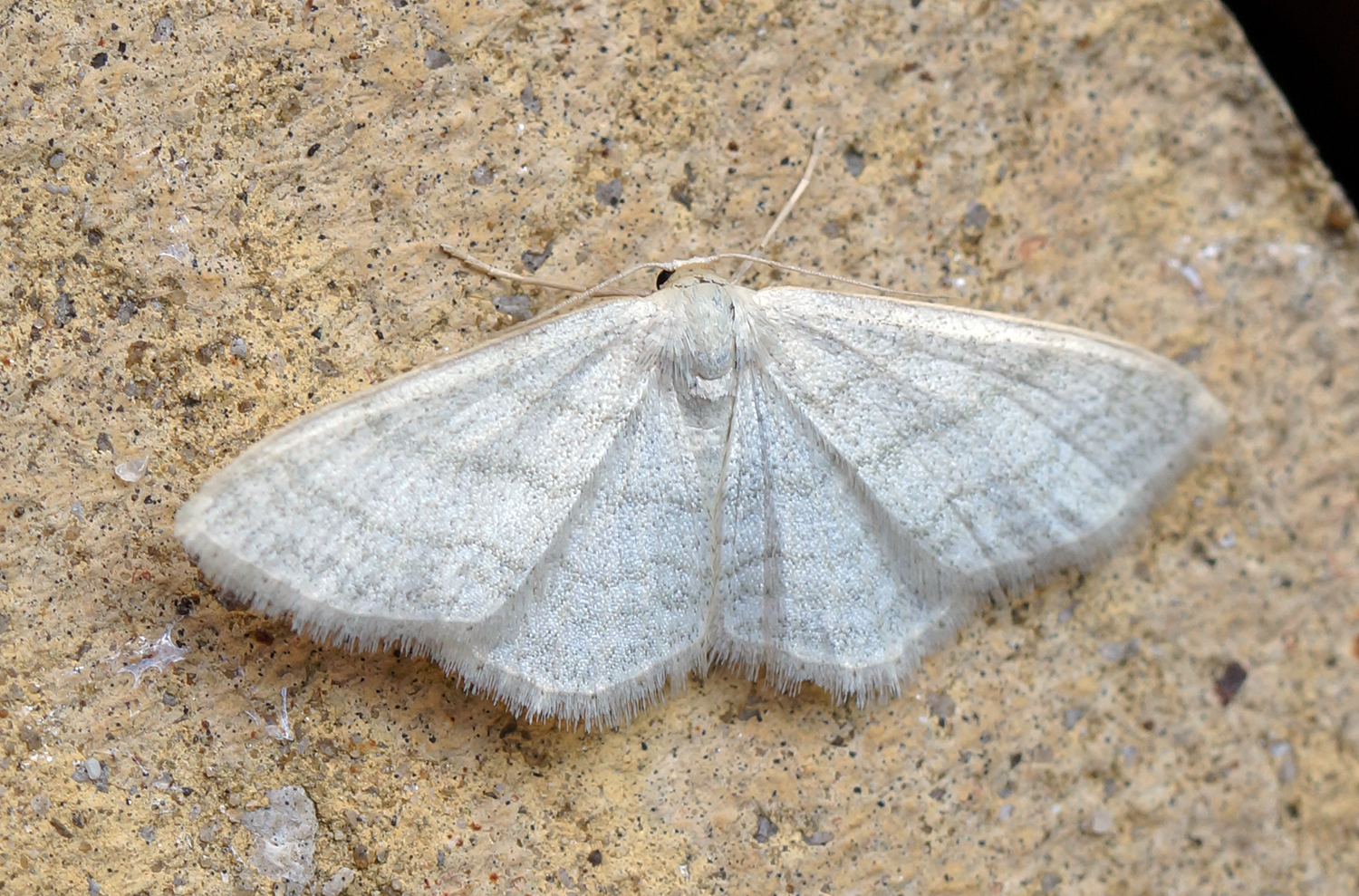

Scientific classification
- Kingdom: Animalia
- Phylum: Arthropoda
- Clade: Pancrustacea
- Class: Insecta
- Order: Lepidoptera
- Family: Geometridae
- Genus: Idaea
- Species: I. subsericeata

Binomial name
- Idaea subsericeata (Haworth, 1809)

= Idaea subsericeata =

Satin wave

Species of moth

Idaea subsericeata, the satin wave, is a moth of the family Geometridae. The species was first described by Adrian Hardy Haworth in 1809. It is found from central and southern Europe, North Africa, Asia Minor to Transcaspia.

== Description ==
The ground colour is white with strong silky gloss, the lines grey, seldom strongly expressed, on the other hand usually all present, thus numbering five on the forewing and four on the hindwing; the outermost line (distal shading of subterminal) the oftenest absent; all except the median are parallel with the distal margin, but slightly wavy; the median on the forewing is usually somewhat oblique, but occasionally almost parallel with the others; that of the hindwing runs straighter across the wing, instead of following the curve of the strongly convex distal margin. Cellspots and terminal line wanting or rarely the former present, minute; fringe usually with a series of minute black dots at the base, which are sometimes in part, more rarely entirely obsolete. Forewing beneath often with a smoky suffusion, either basally or all over; median and postmedian lines present, often well developed; a small discal dot present. Hindwing beneath white, with discal dot and postmedian line. Male antennal ciliation little longer than diameter of shaft; hindtarsus short. Not on the whole an extremely variable species, except in size; there is, however, a great deal of trivial variation, i.e. as regards the absolute or relative strength of the several lines, the close proximity of the inner subterminal to the postmedian or their wider separation, the degree of suffusion of the under surface, etc. Second-brood specimens, besides being smaller seem to be on an average whiter beneath and are sometimes rounder winged. The oval egg has a depression in the middle of the upper end. The surface has small, flat recesses. It is initially light yellow and later turns bright orange with red spots.The caterpillar is relatively slender, the diameter decreasing a little at the front end. It is whitish grey, grey, grey-brown or brown and shows a slightly reddish dorsum. The surface looks wrinkled and is studded with fine warts. The dorsal line is relatively narrow, dark and is lined with dark dots. The lateral lines are yellowish white. The large head has a notch in the middle of the apex.The pupa is blackish brown to golden brown with greenish wing-sheaths . It is nine millimeters long and measures 2.9 millimeters in diameter. The cremaster is about as long as wide and is studded with four pairs of hook-shaped curved bristles.

The species has a wingspan of 22–25 mm. The adults fly in one generation from June to July.

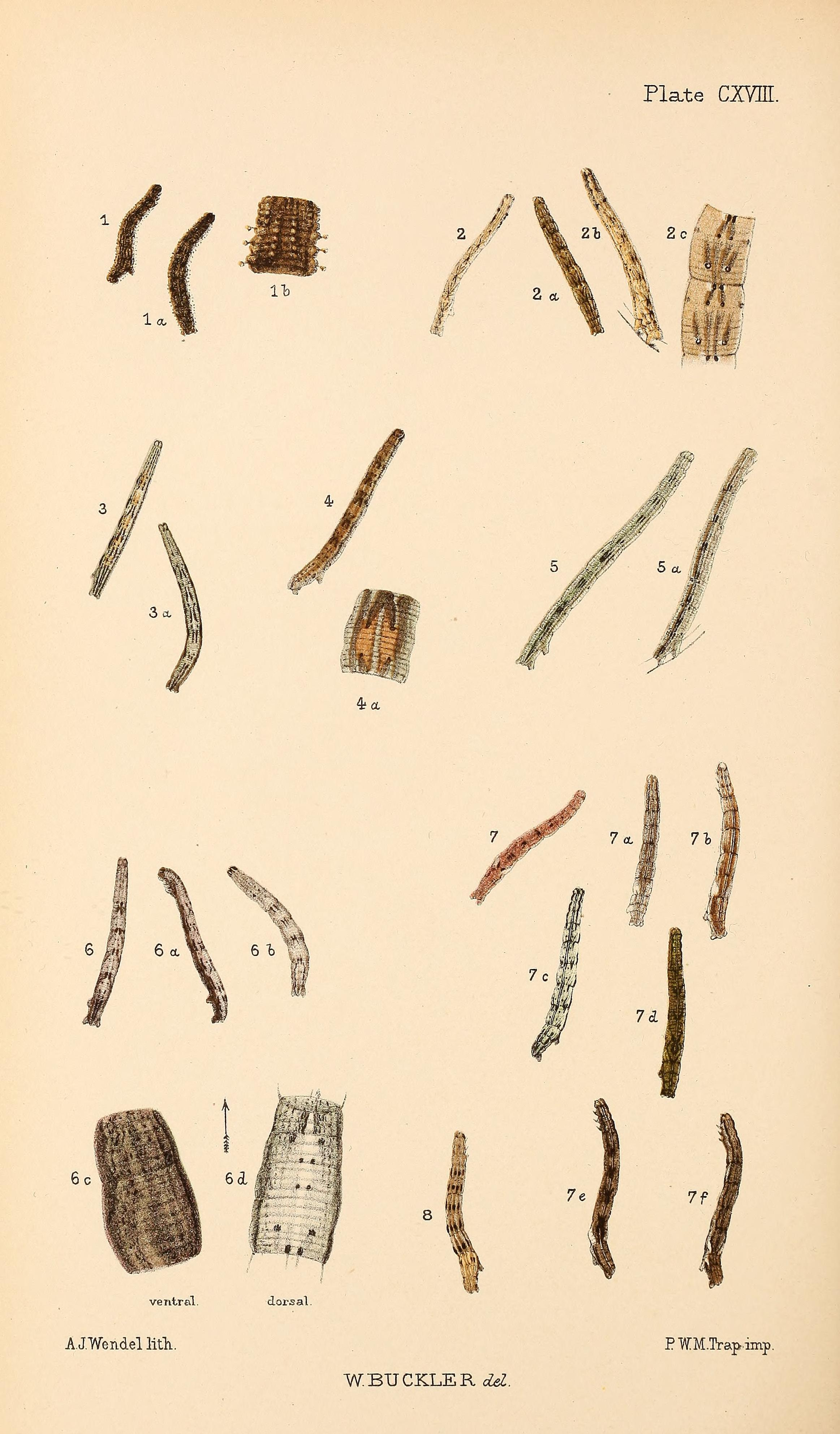
Fig.8 Larvae after final moult

The larvae feed on low growing plants such as knotgrass, dandelion and chickweed. It prefers warm slopes, sun-exposed forest edges and clearings, rows of hedgerows, dry grass, fallow fields, abandoned vineyards and dry salt marshes near the coast.

== Notes ==
1. The flight season refers to the British Isles. This may vary in other parts of the range.
