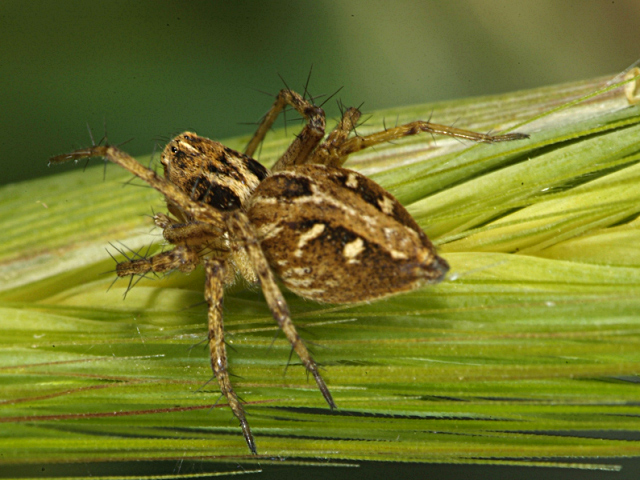

Scientific classification
- Kingdom: Animalia
- Phylum: Arthropoda
- Subphylum: Chelicerata
- Class: Arachnida
- Order: Araneae
- Infraorder: Araneomorphae
- Family: Oxyopidae
- Genus: Oxyopes
- Species: O. heterophthalmus

Binomial name
- Oxyopes heterophthalmus (Latreille, 1804)

Synonyms
- Aranea heterophthalma Latreille, 1804; Sphasus heterophthalmus (Latreille, 1804); Oxyopes variegatus Latreille, 1806; Sphasus alexandrinus Audouin, 1826; Sphasus lineatus Walckenaer, 1837; Oxyopes alexandrines (Audouin, 1826); Oxyopes optabilis O. Pickard-Cambridge, 1872; Oxyopes dentatus Thorell, 1872; Oxyopes lineatus (Walckenaer, 1837)

= Oxyopes heterophthalmus =

Species of spider

Oxyopes heterophthalmus is a lynx spider from the family Oxyopidae, it is the type species of the genus Oxyopes and was described by Pierre André Latreille in 1804, it has a Palearctic distribution.

== Description ==
The palps of the male have a dorsally directed patellar apophysis, which is nearly as long as male's palpal tibia. The epigyne has a reddish-brown median part, and is broadly rounded anteriorly. The body colour is dark brown, with a whitish pattern on the dorsum. The legs are black, with bright hairs and strikingly robust spines. Both sexes are 5–7 millimetres (1/5–3/10 in) in length. Their abdomen is roughly triangular in shape and ends in a point.

== Biology ==
Oxyopes heterophthalmus is a long legged, diurnal hunting spider which is capable of running very fast and jumping on their prey in a similar fashion to a cat, leading to their common name of lynx spider. They do not utilise webs to catch prey. Their eyesight is not as good as that of the jumping spiders but they can see their prey from a distance of up to 10 centimetres (4 in). In Great Britain adults occur in late May and June. The female spins a cocoon which is attached to a plant, she guards this until the eggs hatch.

== Habitat ==
Oxyopes heterophthalmus is normally found in mature dry heathland. It has a preference for heather and other low shrubs.

== Distribution ==
Oxyopes heterophthalmus has a Palearctic distribution. In Europe it is found in Central and Southern Europe, and is more common to the south. In Great Britain it is confined to a few sites in southern England.
