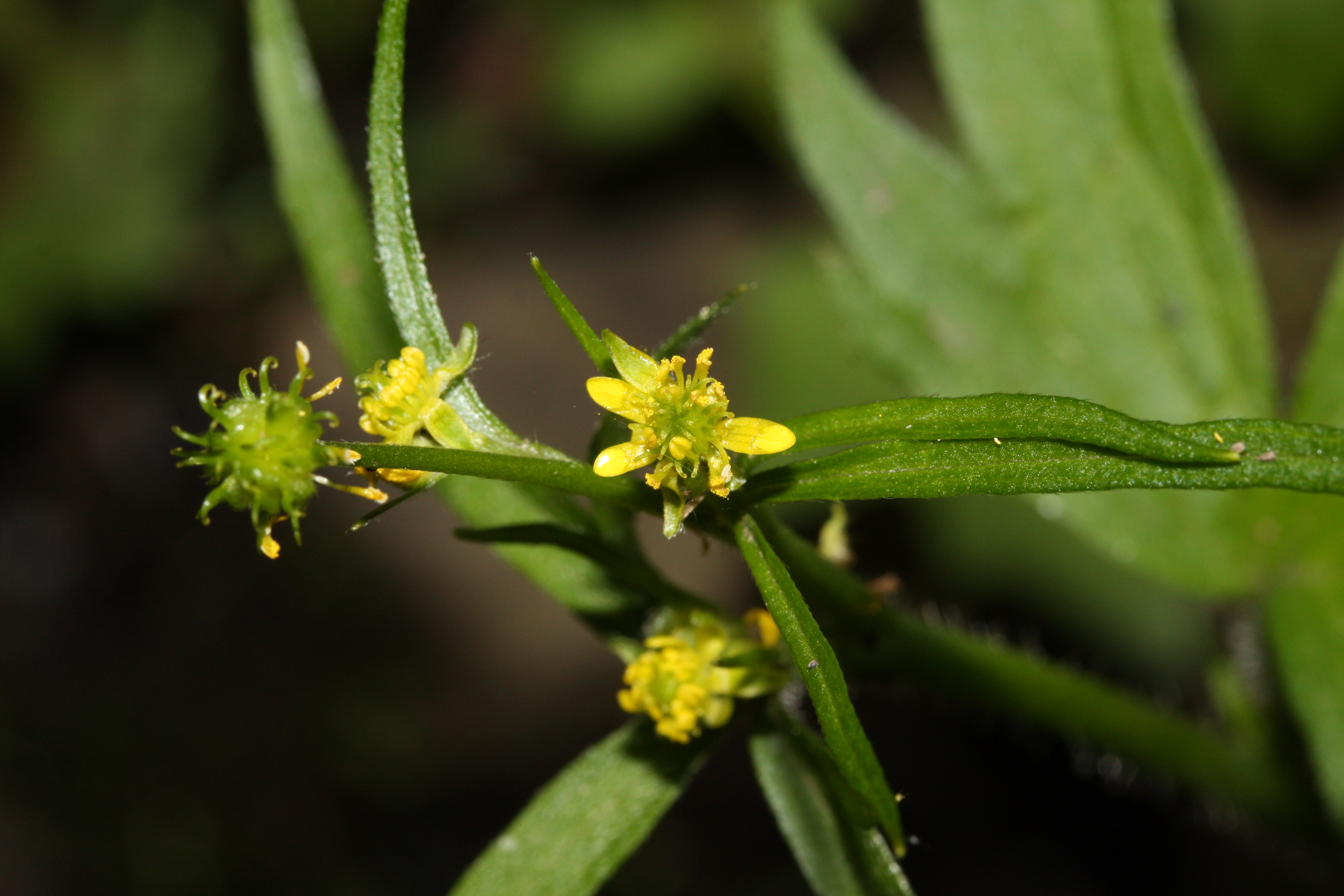

Scientific classification
- Kingdom: Plantae
- Clade: Embryophytes
- Clade: Tracheophytes
- Clade: Spermatophytes
- Clade: Angiosperms
- Clade: Eudicots
- Order: Ranunculales
- Family: Ranunculaceae
- Genus: Ranunculus
- Species: R. uncinatus

Binomial name
- Ranunculus uncinatus D.Don ex G.Don

= Ranunculus uncinatus =

Species of buttercup

Ranunculus uncinatus is a species of buttercup known by the common names woodland buttercup and little buttercup. It is native to western North America from Alaska to California to New Mexico, where it grows in wet, wooded habitat such as forest streambanks.

== Description ==
It is a perennial herb producing a slender, erect stem which may exceed half a meter in maximum height. The lightly hairy lower leaves have blades deeply divided into three toothed lobes borne on long petioles. The upper leaves are smaller and divided into narrower lobes. The flower has four or five yellow petals a few millimeters long around a central receptacle and many stamens and pistils. The fruit is an achene borne in a spherical cluster. The bloom color is yellow. The bloom period is between the months of April to August. A lot of the leaves grow on the long stalks from the base, while a couple leaves grow along the stem. The basal leaves are deeply divided into three lobes, and further divided and toothed. The leaves on the stem are divided further. This plant has tiny clusters of seeds with hooked tips.

Ranunculus uncinatus flowers could be confused with Geum macrophyllum and other members of genus Ranunculus, as these share yellow five-petaled flowers, are found in similar habitats, and have a similar range, but they can be differentiated by examining the leaves and achenes.

== Habitat ==
It can be found in a variety of low to mid-elevation habitats, from meadows, streamsides, and beaches to shady and moist woodlands. It can also be found along trails and other disturbed areas. It can equally be found in non-wetland areas and wetland areas. It is a member of the plant communities of redwood forests, yellow pine forests, red fir forests, and wetland-riparian areas. It can also be found by streams and other areas with water. In elevations, in can be found in anywhere between valleys and lower subalpine.
