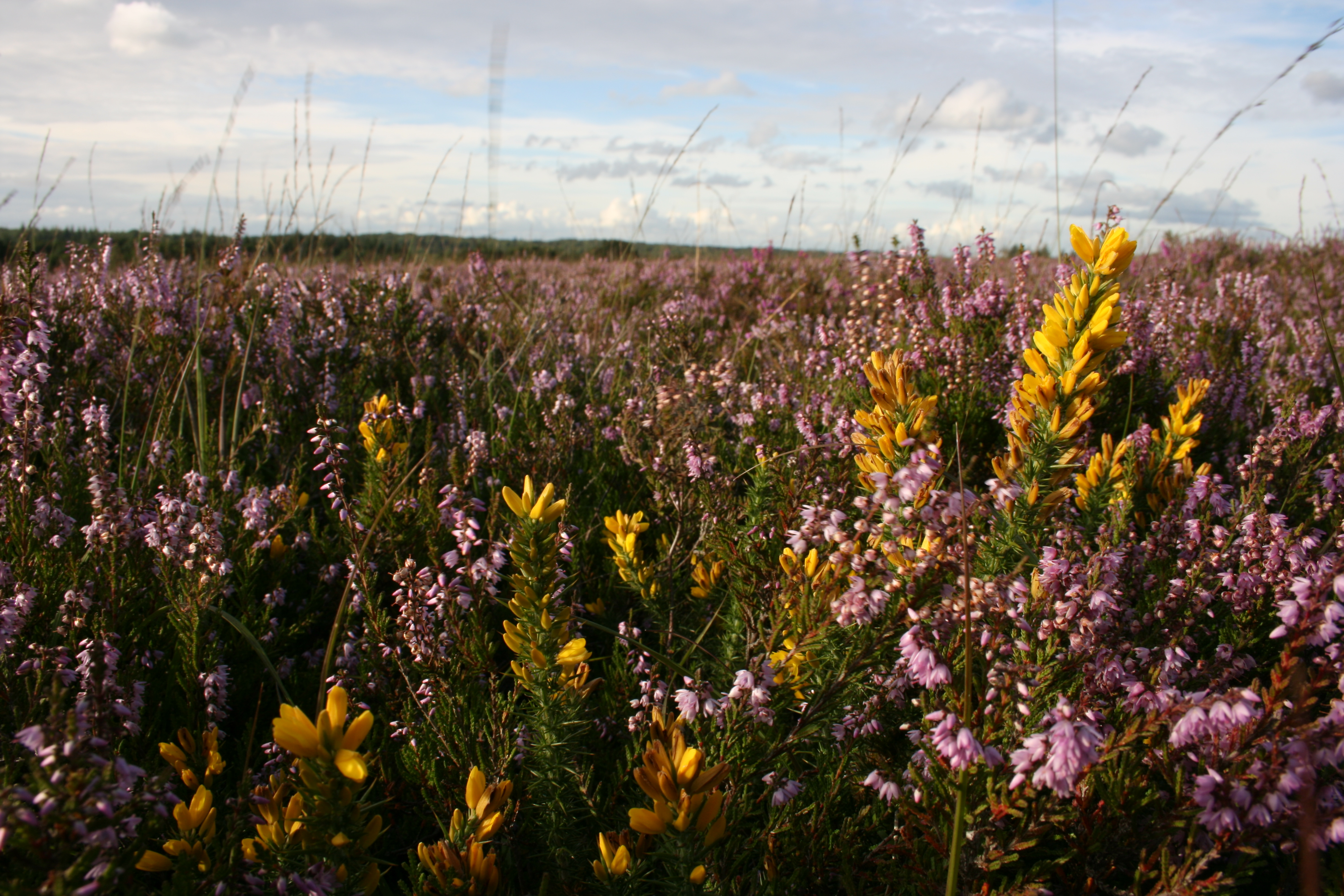

Conservation status
- Least Concern (IUCN 3.1)

Scientific classification
- Kingdom: Plantae
- Clade: Tracheophytes
- Clade: Angiosperms
- Clade: Eudicots
- Clade: Rosids
- Order: Fabales
- Family: Fabaceae
- Subfamily: Faboideae
- Genus: Ulex
- Species: U. minor

Binomial name
- Ulex minor Roth.

= Ulex minor =

Species of flowering plant in the legume family

Ulex minor, the dwarf furze or dwarf gorse is an evergreen dwarf shrub in the family Fabaceae, native to eastern England, France, Spain and Portugal. It is restricted to lowland heathland habitats.

It normally grows about 30 centimetres (10 in) tall, although in shaded, ungrazed conditions it may reach 1 metre (40 in). It is a low-growing shrub, forming small bushes or often growing mingled with heather. The leaves are limited to scales or small spines, and the shoots are modified into rather soft, green, densely crowded spines, about 1 cm (0.4 in) long.

The flowers are yellow, 1–2 cm (0.4–0.8 in) long, with the typical pea-flower structure; they are produced principally in the late summer and autumn, rarely before July. The fruit is a legume (pod), partly enclosed by the pale brown remnants of the flower.

Due to its relatively soft spines, dwarf furze is readily grazed by livestock and wild herbivores.

The distributions of dwarf furze and its close relative western gorse (Ulex gallii) hardly overlap, even in similar habitats.
