= Moor Park =

Moor Park may refer to several things in England:

== Hertfordshire ==
- Moor Park, Hertfordshire, a suburban residential development
- Moor Park (house), a neo-Palladian mansion
- Moor Park Golf Club, a country club
- Moor Park tube station, a commuter rail station

== Elsewhere in England ==
- Moor Park, Blackpool, a municipal park
- Moor Park, Crosby, Merseyside, a residential area
- Moor Park, Preston, a municipal park and electoral ward
  - Moor Park High School
- Moor Park School, Shropshire, a Catholic preparatory school near Ludlow
- Moor Park, Farnham, Surrey, a house and park
  - Moor Park SSSI, a Site of Special Scientific Interest

== See also ==
- Moor Park and Eastbury, a ward in Three Rivers, England
- Moorpark, California, USA
- Moore Park (disambiguation)
