= Moor Park, Farnham =

House in Farnham, Surrey, England

Coordinates: 51.2115°N 0.7671°W

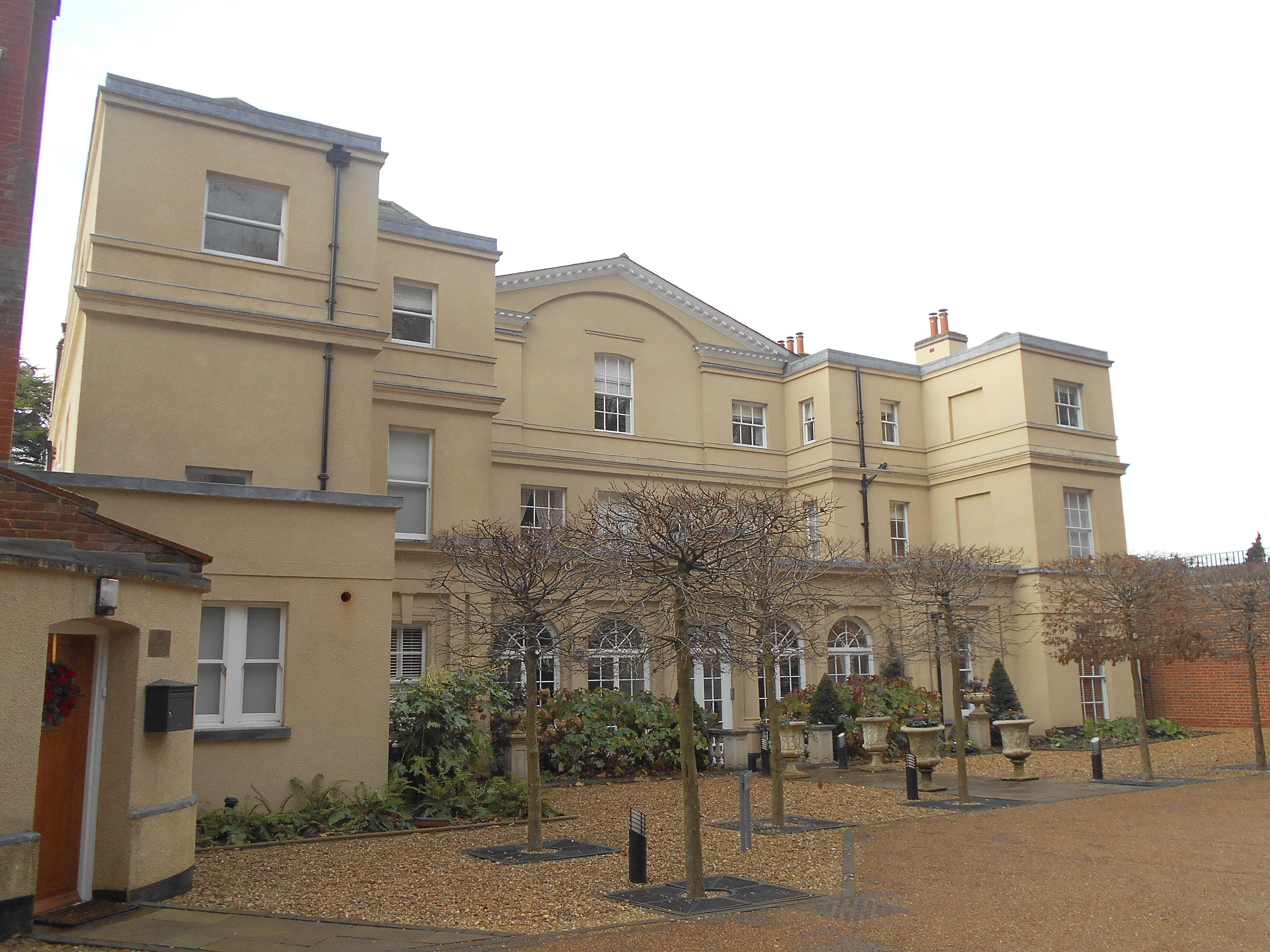
The front of Moor Park House

For the school in the UK see More House School, Frensham

Moor Park, Farnham, Surrey, England is a listed building and 60 acres (0.24 km^{2}) of riverside grounds, in the former chapelry of Compton. The grounds formerly extended to Mother Ludlam's Cave, a cave entrenched in local folklore which faces across the Wey (north branch) to the ruins of Waverley Abbey.

Following an early 20th century settlement to a dispute, public access is to a path running the length of the grounds. The building dates from 1630 but has been substantially altered, later that century, and in 1750 and 1800. Former names for it are Morehouse and Compton Hall. It was home to philosophical writer and satirist Jonathan Swift at the end of the seventeenth century; and served as a hydrotherapy retreat in the nineteenth century when it was visited by George Combe, the leading phrenologist of the day, who died here, and by naturalist Charles Darwin.

== Approaches to Moor Park ==
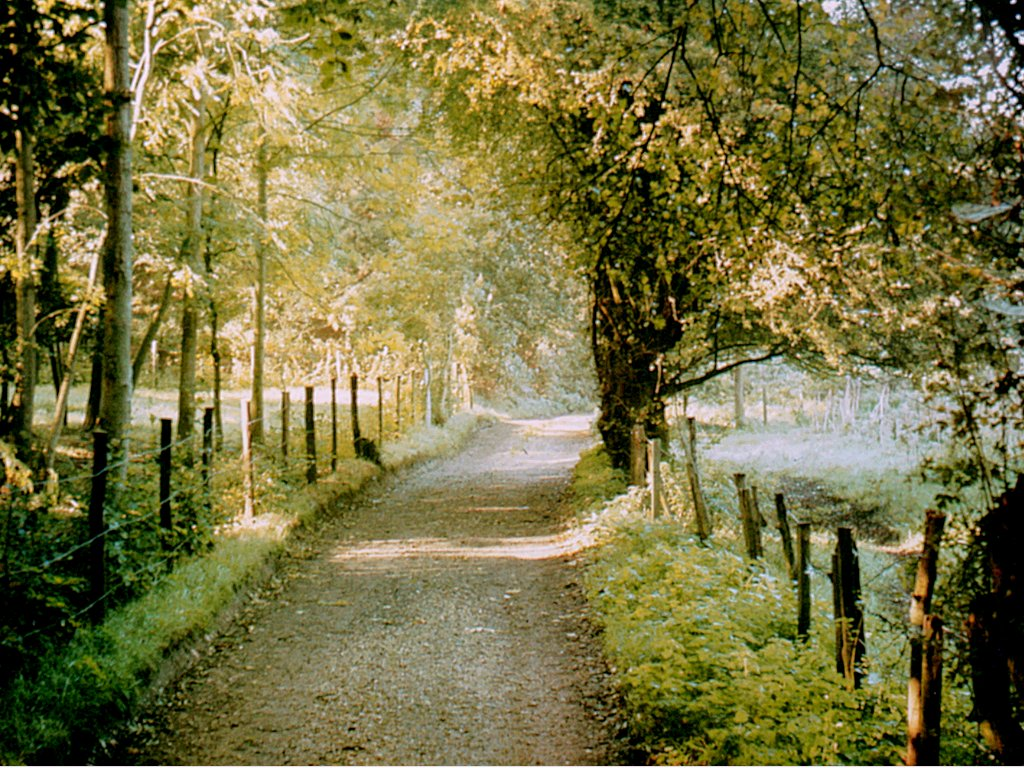
Moor Park Lane

The North Downs Way runs along the pavement north of the site and runs east through woods of Runfold.

Access is possible by road, but walking provides many further areas to view. A major spur of the long-distance footpath, the Greensand Way commences in the grounds, passes the front of the house, leading to Moor Park Nature Reserve, Mother Ludlam's Cave and has a bridge to Waverley Abbey all at the far end of the grounds.

Moor Park Lane, a northern bridleway and former carriage drive, links the house to the A31 road at the Shepherd and Flock pub, Farnham with parking. To one side of this in water meadows with several channels is High Mill, which is Grade II listed and the partially hidden (and dry) remains of an artificial waterfall which featured on picture postcards in Victorian times.

== Medieval period ==
A house has stood on the site, next to the River Wey at the hamlet of Compton since at least the Tudor period when it had 434 acres (176 ha), 200 of which were detached in Farnham. In the pre-19th century sense, it was never a 'park' as its owner never had a right of free warren. The Feet of Fines for the county for the 35th year of Edward I (suggesting 1307) records a real estate action of 'land in Farnham' between Stephen de Trolleburg and his wife against Robert son of Richard de Westbroke.

Whether they had held it or not in 1307, Compton Hall was held by indefinitely long lease of the Bishop of Winchester at a customary rent of 4s (equivalent to £235 in 2025) by the family mentioned: William Westbroke/Westbrook holding from 1516 until his 1537 death without issue, when by moiety title the site devolved to the male grandsons of Florence Scarlett and Elizabeth Hull, which had become subject to a 40s a year lease to Henry Stynte in 1571, them having moved to Godalming. Five to six years later, Richard Cresswell then Anthony Bagge received it. Later, owner Robert Ashton leased it to his nephew, John Cotton. It formed part of the 1632 death estate of Sir Richard Clarke.

== Sir William Temple, patron of Swift ==
About 1686 the house was bought by Sir William Temple from the Clarke estates and it was he who renamed it Moor Park after the Hertfordshire mansion of that name. The latter property also influenced the magnificent 5 acres (2.0 ha)-gardens that he laid out along the nearest part of the riverside. These are separately listed by English Heritage, acting under their legislative remit,

== Jonathan Swift ==
It was while at Moor Park that Temple employed Jonathan Swift as his secretary, and it was here that Swift wrote A Tale of a Tub and The Battle of the Books and met Esther Johnson, daughter of an impoverished widow who acted as companion to Temple's sister. Swift acted as her tutor and mentor, giving her the nickname "Stella", and the two maintained a close relationship for the rest of Esther's life: some believed that they secretly married in 1716. Swift met many of Temple's distinguished guests during his time here: King William III, John Dryden, Joseph Addison, Richard Steele and others.

== 1770-1900 ==
Temple died in 1699. He was buried in Westminster Abbey, but his heart, by his special wish, was placed in a silver casket under the sun-dial at Moor Park, near his favourite window seat. He left Moor Park to his granddaughter Elizabeth, who married her husband John Temple and died in 1770, leaving it to her nephew Basil Bacon, son of Nicholas Bacon of Shrubland Hall. His estranged son Charles Williams resumed the name of Bacon on inheriting (due to lack of siblings' heirs) and the house became a hydrotherapy centre under La Trobe Bateman who bought it in 1858. Here, Charles Darwin received hydropathic treatment in 1859 for his illness from Dr Edward Wickstead Lane. He wrote that he played billiards here and said "I really think I shall make a point of coming here for a fortnight occasionally, as the country is very pleasant for walking". He wrote that "it is really quite astonishing & utterly unaccountable the good this one week has done me", but later became more unwell and told his son that he was unable to climb more than halfway up the nearby 100m proud Crooksbury Hill.

== The Battle of Moor Park ==
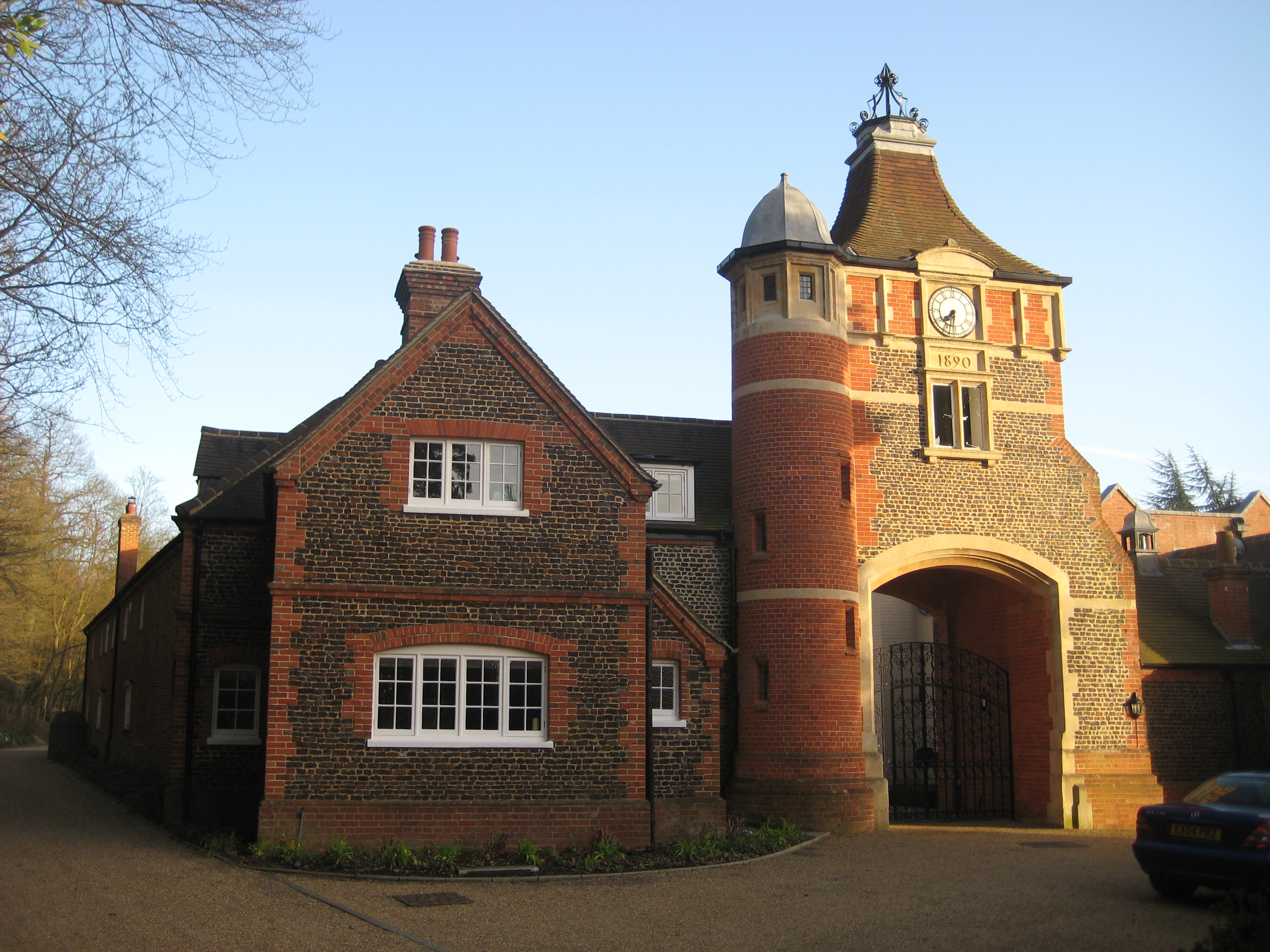
Gate house with clock, by the site of the Battle of Moor Park

One of Temple's descendants, Sir William Rose, informed Farnham Urban District Council in 1897 that he intended to close the lodge gates of Moor Park and "not allow any person to enter without written authority". The council informed Rose's solicitor that "they had no doubt as to the rights of way over Moor Park and were resolved at whatever cost to use all proper means to preserve such rights". Matters escalated quickly. Rose determined that he would go ahead with the closure and the council prepared to reopen the gates, by force if necessary. Rose employed former Metropolitan Policemen and others to secure the gates by force. The events of Sunday, 17 January 1897 were not in keeping with the traditional view of a Victorian gentleman's estate on the Sabbath - Rose's men closed the gates and secured them with chains. A crowd of some four to five hundred local men (and a few women) gathered outside, armed with sticks, crowbars, sledgehammers and other tools or weapons. The council's men were cheered by the crowd as they forced open the gates using crowbars. The defenders (private forces) were no match for the crowd (who were supporting the removal of an unlawful obstruction). The event was dubbed the Moor Park Riot or the Battle of Moor Park.

== Moor Park in the 20th century ==
The estate was purchased in the late 19th century by (William) Aldwin Soames (1850–1916), a solicitor and first-class cricketer, whose father, a Russian merchant and soap manufacturer, had founded Brighton College in 1845. His family occupied the house until about 1937, when its freehold was sold by a Temple-Rose descendant to become a country club, "Swift's Club".

During World War II the house was requisitioned by the army who used it as a billet for Canadian troops. Moor Park became seriously dilapidated during this period and, in 1948, was bought by a developer for demolition. In the summer of that year Sir Harry Brittain wrote to The Times, appealing for it to be saved. A Canon, R. E. Parsons, responded by using the house to set up a Christian Adult Education centre, Moor Park College. At the end of 1949 Canon Parsons, his wife Hester, and their family came to live in the adjoining cottage. They devoted their energies, supported by financial gifts, volunteer help, and grants from Surrey County Council, to the venture of restoring the house and setting up the college. In 1953 funds were exhausted and an emergency meeting was called but the Hesters, supported by a group, the Friends of Moor Park, survived the crisis and, the following year, a milestone was reached when an educational trust was established to run the college.

The top floor was used by "Oversea Service" as their headquarters and college from 1955 to 1959. This organisation, set up by The Rev Dr Harry Holland and supported by the Colonial Service, Barclays Bank and other businesses, provided international briefing conferences for persons about to embark on voluntary or business ventures abroad (particularly South-east Asia) in order that they could better understand the local cultures and etiquette. Oversea Service, under Holland's directorship, moved in 1959 to Farnham Castle where, by 1986, it was providing briefings to 30,000 people a year. The departure of Oversea Service enabled the vacant space to be used for training for the ministry for four years until the establishment of a dedicated theological college in Durham.

It was to become the first in a chain of colleges for adult Christian education, under supervision of Canon R.E. Parsons, formerly the Secretary of the Churches’ Committee for Religious Education among men in the forces and Canon and Prebendary of Warthill in York Minster. The Moor Park College for Adult Christian Education was supported by financial gifts, volunteer help and grants from Surrey County Council and survived a financial crisis in 1953 from which it was handed over to an educational trust. The chapel, library and spacious conference room provided accommodation for assemblies of up to 50 students. The top floor of the house was used by the Overseas Service, as offices and a college for persons about to embark on voluntary or business ventures abroad. The Christian college vacated in the late 1960s and it was used as a finishing school and later the Constance Spry Flower School. More recently it was converted back into residential use as 3 luxury apartments, with 8 new mews houses and 12 new apartments in the walled garden.

== Developments and major planning application ==
The original property has been divided into two houses, Moor Park and Ivy Cottage.

In 2007 the owners applied for planning and listed building consent from Waverley Borough Council for demolition of listed stables, addition of extensions, internal and external changes to the main house, and construction on the site of the listed park and garden to provide 24 dwellings, which was refused. New owners Farnham Developments ltd subsequently acquired it and redeveloped the buildings as 24 residential units in 2010 (3 luxury apartments in the main house, with 8 new mews houses and 12 new apartments in the walled garden). The company went into administration in September 2012. HWO architects were the project architects and Bell Cornwell acted as planning consultants.

== Moor Park Nature Reserve ==
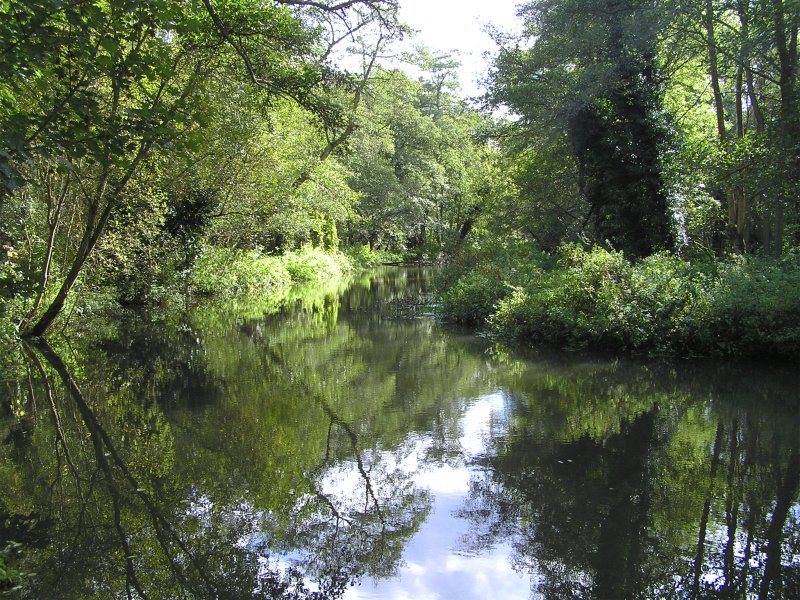
The River Wey in Moor Park Nature Reserve

The footpath through the grounds leads to a 19 acres (7.69 ha) Nature Reserve on the north bank of the River Wey.

The nature reserve is a Site of Special Scientific Interest (SSSI). A nationally rare habitat, it is the only example of deep-water alder swamp in Surrey and is mostly deep and inaccessible. A boardwalk and path runs around the reserve. In winter redpoll, siskins and mixed flocks of tits feed on the alder cones. Waterfowl seen here includes mallard, teal and tufted duck, and in the spring, nesting mute swans. A variety of reeds and sedges can be found, together with marsh violets, opposite-leaved golden saxifrage, hemlock and water dropwort. Warblers nest here and water rail may be heard. Kingfishers and grey herons are frequent visitors.

This reserve is one of the last places that an otter was seen in Surrey in the 1970s when their population was at a low ebb. Active conservation measures have seen otters return to the River Wey at Godalming, a few miles away, recently, so there is optimism that they may soon inhabit this stretch of river again.

== The GHQ Line through Moor Park ==
The GHQ Line (General Headquarters Line) was a defence line built in the United Kingdom during World War II to contain an expected German invasion. Part of the GHQ Stop Line B runs through the area south and east of Farnham through the valley of the River Wey and was designed to prevent a German invasion force from using the Wey Valley to reach London. Many defences from this era - gun emplacements, pillboxes, "dragons' teeth" and other anti-tank defences can be seen from the path leading through Moor Park from the house towards the caves and abbey or towards Farnham.
