= Compton, Waverley =

Village and parish in Surrey, England

Coordinates: 51.211°N 0.763°W

Compton
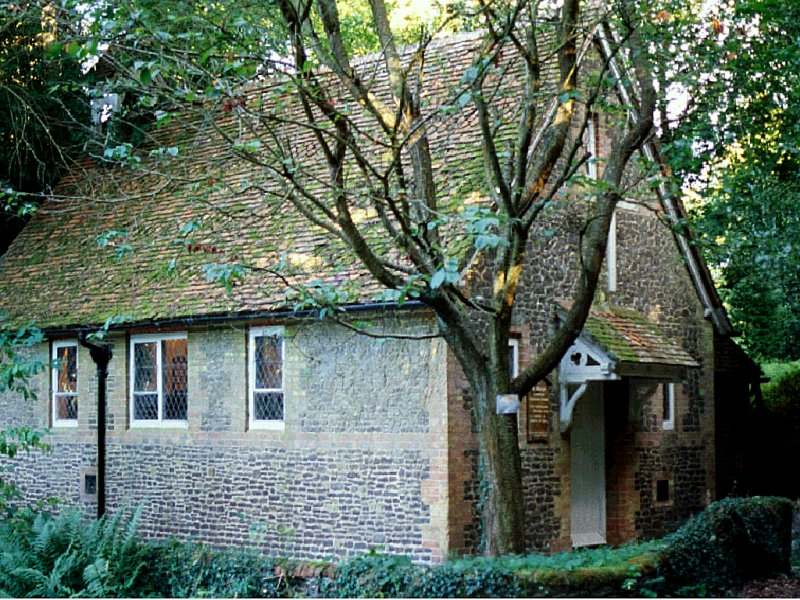
- St Mary's Church, Compton

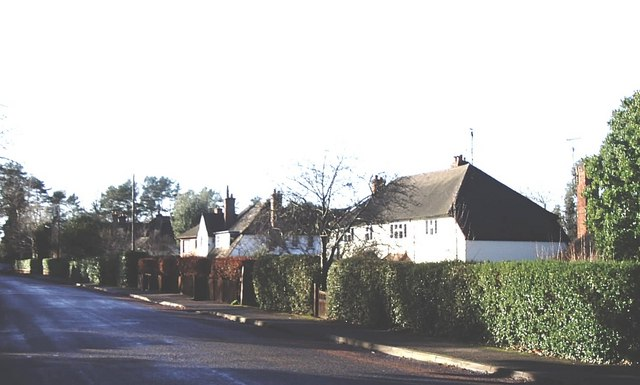
- Typical homes on Old Compton Lane

- Location within Surrey
- Area: 5.28 km^{2} (2.04 sq mi)
- Population: 3,120 (2011 census, historic formal definition)
  - Density: 591/km^{2} (1,530/sq mi)
- OS grid reference: SU856465
- Civil parish: Farnham
- District: Waverley
- Shire county: Surrey
- Region: South East
- Country: England
- Sovereign state: United Kingdom
- Post town: Farnham
- Postcode district: GU9
- Dialling code: 01252
- Police: Surrey
- Fire: Surrey
- Ambulance: South East Coast
- UK Parliament: Farnham and Bordon

Compton is a former village and today a semi-rural suburb centred 1 mile (1.6 km) ESE of Farnham in the Waverley district of Surrey, England and connected to Farnham by two direct urban single carriageways and green space footpaths along the Wey (North Branch) which in part marks the northern boundary of the area together with the A31. The area relies on Farnham for most of its modern amenities and its eastern part is rural whereas its western part is urban, with a divide where the Wey flows between the two south-eastwards.

== History ==
Compton was a medieval-founded tything and manor. Although on few modern maps, it is considered to include Moor Park, Farnham on the left bank of the Wey, further east. Moor Park, a Grade II listed building, takes its recent name from Moor Park House the former mansion of Sir William Temple, where Jonathan Swift, author of Gulliver's Travels lived and worked. The house dates from 1307 when it was Compton Hall. Compton has given its name to the local roads Compton Way and Old Compton Lane, while Compton Woods is an area of woodland with public access.

Having three window bays and two storeys, the present manor house is an ordinary building in a grid of streets towards Farnham proper and was probably built in the mid 19th century. The Bishop of Winchester owned, or was overlord of, the land of the area and was given the right to live in near-by Farnham Castle, as a result of its founding by William the Conqueror's grandson Henry of Blois and of Winchester.

== Amenities and ruins ==
Compton has one of three churches of Farnham parish in the Church of England, St Mary's Church, built in 1918. This structure was built from local Bargate stone which is the stone of the Greensand Ridge and is a form of dense sandstone which is also an ironstone.

On the boundary of the area are the ruins of the Cistercian Waverley Abbey managed by English Heritage and Mother Ludlam's Cave, connected by footpaths. The river here is the sinuous west or 'north' branch of the Wey, upstream of Tilford where it combines with the south branch and of the town of Godalming where it becomes navigable.

== Demography ==
Though widely mapped, Compton is no longer strictly defined, neither as a census unit nor as one of the town's electoral wards. As at the 2011 census it equated to Waverley 004D with most of 004C which is largely urban and includes Farnham railway station and part of the town centre's dual carriageway and a lengthy division: Waverley 003D (which takes in most of its homes and many of the town's businesses to the north of the Sheep and Flock major roundabout and includes Farnham Hospital). Taking the first two wards are covered below to provide for an approximation.

2011 Published Statistics: Population, home ownership and extracts from Physical Environment, surveyed in 2005
Output area	Usual residents	km²
Waverley 004D - including formally and previous associated Moor Park	1,604	4.72
Waverley 004C - part in modern times identifies significantly with central Farnham	1,516	0.56
