= Frensham =

Village in Surrey, England

Coordinates: 51.16°N 0.80°W

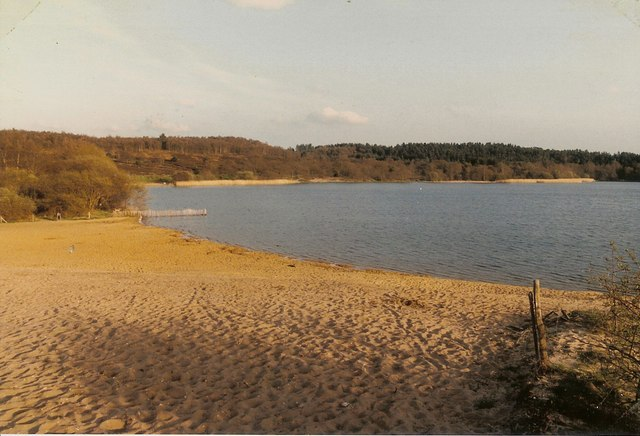
- The Great Pond at Frensham Common

- Location within Surrey
- Area: 16.21 km^{2} (6.26 sq mi)
- Population: 1,689 (Civil Parish 2011)
  - Density: 104/km^{2} (270/sq mi)
- OS grid reference: SU8441
- Civil parish: Frensham
- District: Waverley
- Shire county: Surrey
- Region: South East
- Country: England
- Sovereign state: United Kingdom
- Post town: Farnham
- Postcode district: GU10
- Dialling code: 01252
- Police: Surrey
- Fire: Surrey
- Ambulance: South East Coast
- UK Parliament: Farnham and Bordon

Frensham is a village in Surrey, England, next to the A287 road, 13 miles (20.9 km) WSW of Guildford, the county town. Frensham lies on the right bank of the River Wey (south branch), only navigable to canoes, shortly before its convergence with the north branch. Farnham is the nearest town, 3.5 miles (5.6 km) to the north.

The majority of Frensham parish is within the Metropolitan Green Belt and the substantial green buffer in the parish is Frensham Common which is owned by the National Trust and is a Site of Special Scientific Interest (SSSI). The non-agricultural land surrounding the village is mainly open heathland and birch woodland. The Common covers about 1,000 acres (400 ha) and comprises heathland, together with some coniferous and mixed woodland. There are two large ponds, known as Frensham Great and Little Ponds, which were built in the Middle Ages to provide fish for the Bishop of Winchester's estate and today are the backdrop for a hotel and are used for fishing and sailing.

== History ==
=== Before the English Reformation ===
Mesolithic camp or living sites have been discovered around Frensham. Hundreds of Bronze Age arrowheads have been found around Frensham and there are several tumuli (burial sites). In 688 AD, King Caedwalla of Wessex made a charter conveying to the Catholic church 60 hides of land that included Farnham, Frensham and Churt. This became the property of Hedda, Bishop of Winchester.

The origins of the name Frensham come from 'Frena's ham'. Frena was the name of either a Danish Earl who was killed in the battle of Ashdown in the year 871, or of a Saxon who was driven south from Northumberland by the Danes in 993. The second part 'ham' means 'settlement', and is also from where we get the word 'home', so Frensham is 'Frena's settlement'.

In 1348, there was an outbreak of the plague in Frensham. Before it ceased in 1350, fifty-two area farms had become desolate.

Frensham Beale Manor, off Mill Lane, is a Grade II listed timber framed manor house dating from the 14th century.

== Neighbourhoods ==
Frensham includes the neighbourhood or locality, largely separated by a small green buffer, Rushmoor or Rush Moor.

A few outlying farmsteads have also become reverted to clusters of houses.

=== Industries ===
Locally clay was extracted from around Frensham for Farnham Pottery. The Bishop of Winchester managed to retain ownership of most of his historic Farnham estate including most manors in the south until the 19th century.

In the 17th century, farmers focused primarily on hop growing and sheep rearing. Fishermen continued to work Frensham Great Pond.

=== 20th century ===
Having been drained in World War II the lakes in the common were transformed into a leisure destination and in the late 20th century they were used as film locations for the 1999 film The Mummy. Actress Liza Goddard was a Frensham resident.

Pierrepont School was bought by Ellel Ministries International and converted into a training centre.

== St Mary's Church ==
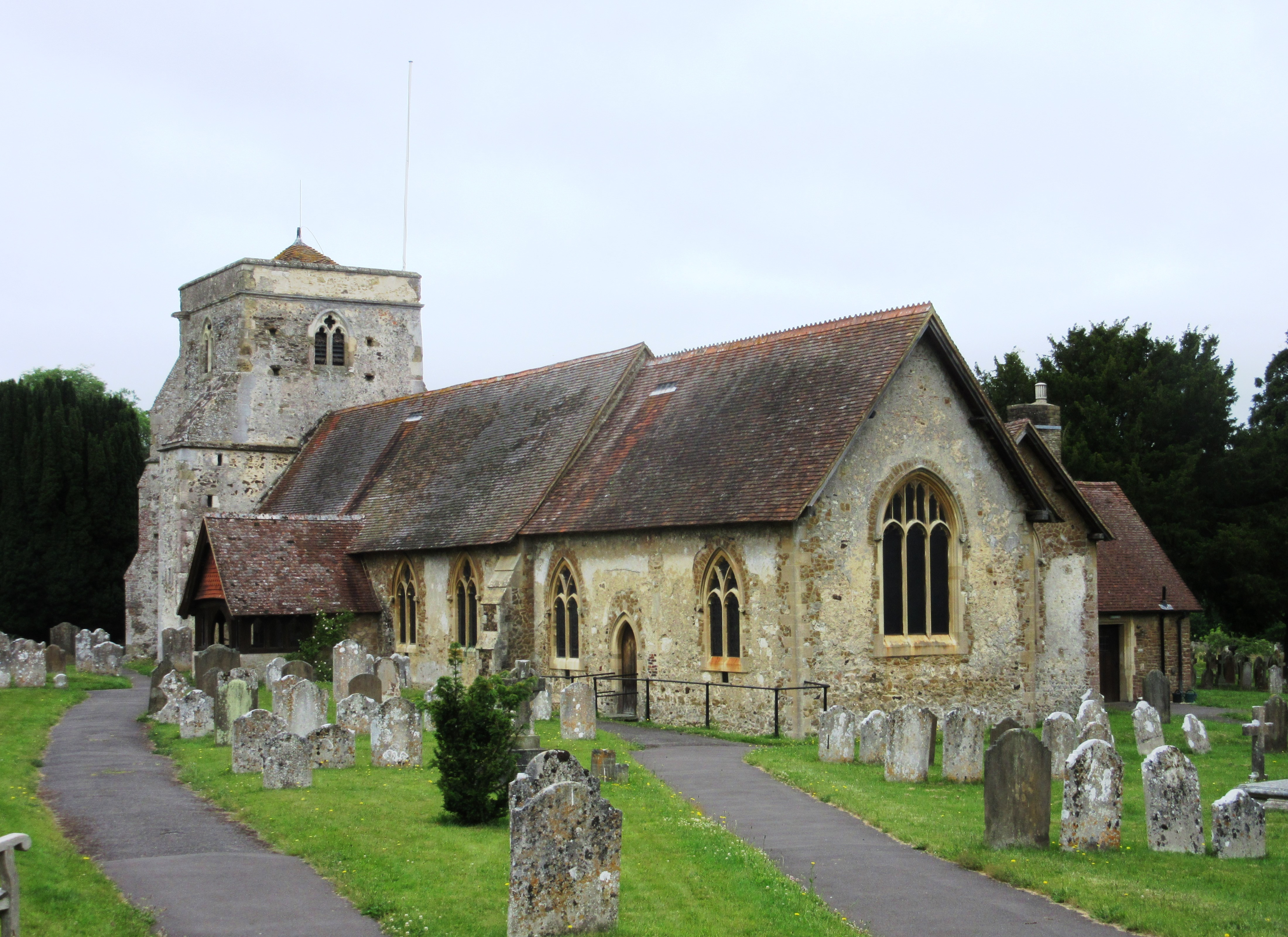
St Mary the Virgin's Church

Originally a chapelry of Farnham, the present St Mary's Church was dedicated in 1239, having been moved from its previous site on low ground beside the River Wey. The move was probably due to the massive storms of the 1230s which flooded Waverley Abbey, 3.7 miles (6.0 km) downstream, to a depth of 5 feet 8 inches (1.73 m).

The chancel is the oldest part of the church, its walls being those of the original building, the 13th-century niches, piscina and aumbry. The tower is 14th century, with massive diagonal buttresses and eight bells dated between 1627 and the 19th century. The porch is restored but is believed to be 15th century. The north aisle was built in 1827, and the whole church was subject to a major restoration in 1868. The church is now a Grade II* listed building.

The font, of Purbeck Marble, is early medieval but its carvings are nearly obliterated. The organ was installed in 1871 with subsequent modernisations. The exterior of the building is of local sandstone, flint and rubble, with evidence of endless repair and reconstruction.

The church contains a large cauldron, said to have been borrowed from the fairies and never returned. Other versions of the story claimed it belonged to Mother Ludlam, a local white witch. More realistically it is likely to have come from Waverley Abbey, when the latter was dissolved by Thomas Cromwell, and was originally used for brewing beer.

== Demography and housing ==
=== Historic ===
The population of Frensham in 1851 was 714. Today the area of Frensham, Dockenfield and Tilford has a total population of 3,961.

=== Latest statistics ===
2011 Census Homes
Output area	Detached	Semi-detached	Terraced	Flats and apartments	Caravans/temporary/mobile homes	shared between households
(Civil Parish)	395	162	41	49	1	0

The average level of accommodation in the region composed of detached houses was 28%, the average that was apartments was 22.6%.

2011 Census Key Statistics
Output area	Population	Households	% Owned outright	% Owned with a loan	hectares
(Civil Parish)	1,689	648	42.3%	39.7%	1,621

The proportion of households in the civil parish who owned their home outright compares to the regional average of 35.1%. The proportion who owned their home with a loan compares with the regional average of 32.5%. The remaining percentage is made up of rented dwellings (plus a negligible percentage of households living rent-free).

== Amenities ==
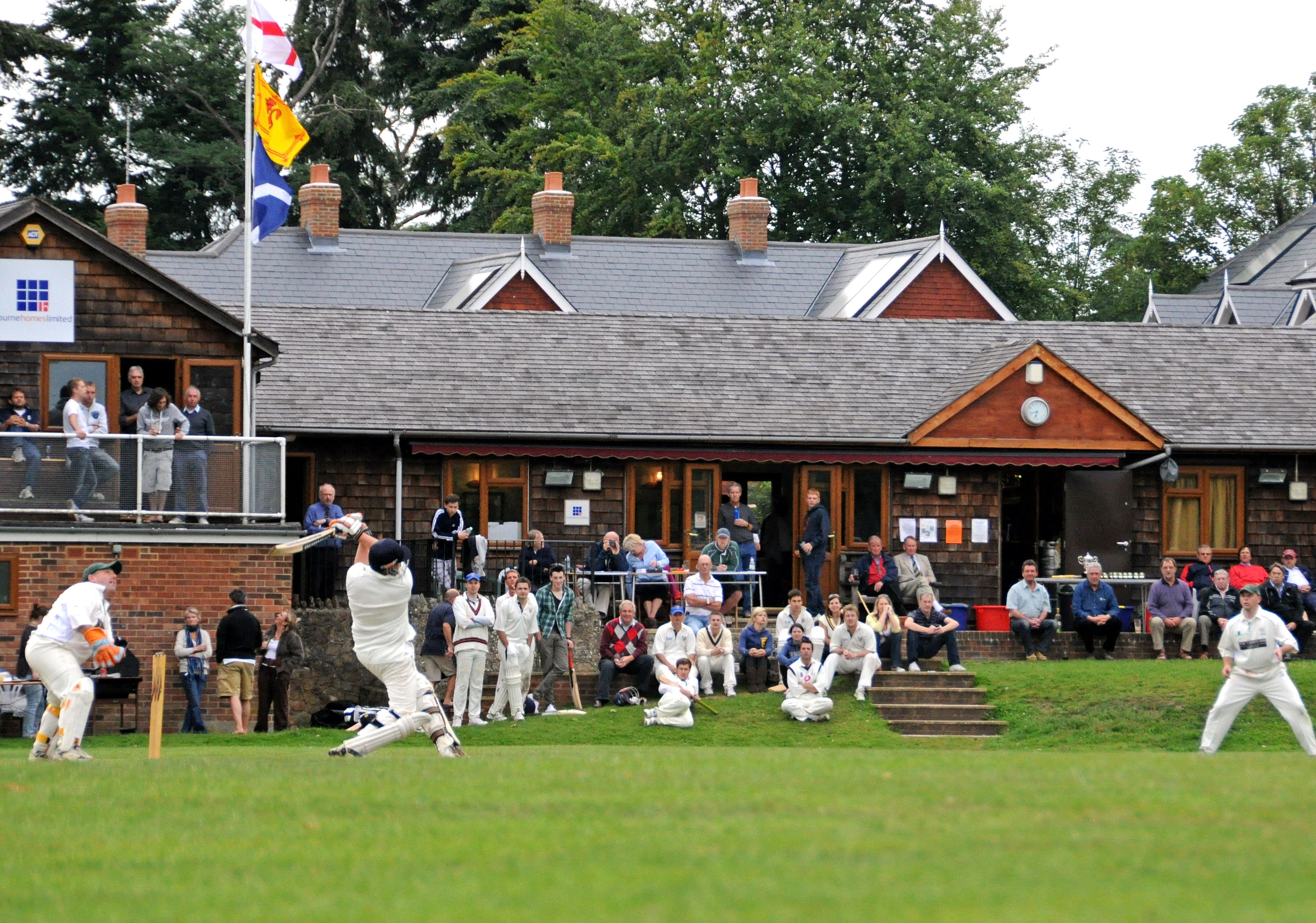
Cricket on the village ground.

Frensham post office and village shop is a community run shop and celebrated its tenth anniversary in January 2006.

There are four local schools: St Mary's Church of England Infants' School, Frensham Heights, Edgeborough and More House.

More House School is the largest residential special school in the UK, educating boys with specific learning and language-based difficulties, including dyslexia, developmental language disorders and dyspraxia.

Frensham Great Pond, lying within Frensham Common, extends over 100 acres (0.40 km^{2}) and is a centre for sailing activities. The pond sometimes suffers from eutrophication. The occasional presence of blue-green algae means that official advice regarding swimming varies, as indicated by notices at the water's edge. The smaller Frensham Little Pond is a scenic area for picnics - neither swimming nor sailing is allowed there.

There are two active sports clubs in the village – Frensham Cricket Club and the Frensham RBL Bowls Club. The cricket club (2013) has two grounds, and plays in the I'Anson league with local villages. The bowls club have a very busy friendlies schedule as well as playing in the West Surrey Men's League, the Three Counties Bowl Fellowship and the Farnham and District League.
