= Moor Park SSSI =

Protected area in Surrey, England

Coordinates: 51.205°N 0.759°W

Moor Park
- Site of Special Scientific Interest
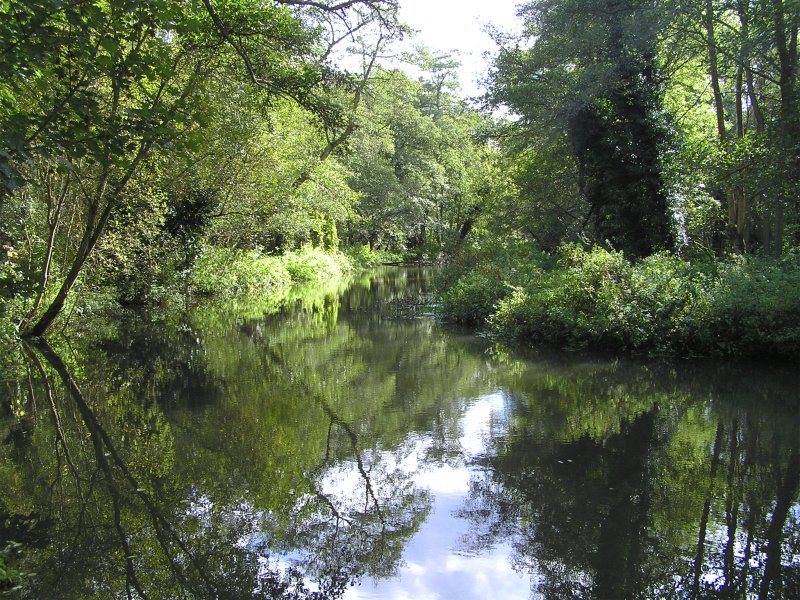
- Location of Moor Park.
- Area of search: Surrey
- Grid reference: SU 868 458
- Interest: Biological
- Area: 6.7 hectares (17 acres)
- Notification date: 1987
- Location map: Magic Map

Moor Park is a 6.7-hectare (17-acre) biological Site of Special Scientific Interest east of Farnham in Surrey.

This site in the valley of the River Wey is mainly alder carr, which is a nationally rare habitat. It is dominated by alder, with some crack willow. An area of swamp is mainly covered by common reed, with other plants including water-plantain, marsh violet, opposite leaved golden-saxifrage and hemlock water-dropwort.

The site is part of the grounds of Moor Park, Farnham, a listed building. The Greensand Way footpath runs through the site.
