= Moore Park =

Moore Park may refer to the following places:

== Australia ==
- Moore Park, New South Wales, a park and suburb in Sydney
- Moore Park, Queensland, a town in the Bundaberg Region
- Moore Park Beach, Queensland, a locality in the Bundaberg Region
- Moore Park Nature Reserve, a remnant of gallery rainforest in northern New South Wales

== Canada ==
- Moore Park, Toronto in Ontario, Canada

== United Kingdom ==
- Moorepark, an area of Govan in Glasgow, Scotland

== United States ==
- Moore Park (Oregon), a recreational facility in Klamath Falls, Oregon
- Moore Park, a recreational facility in the Brookline section of Pittsburgh, Pennsylvania

== See also ==
- Moor Park (disambiguation)
