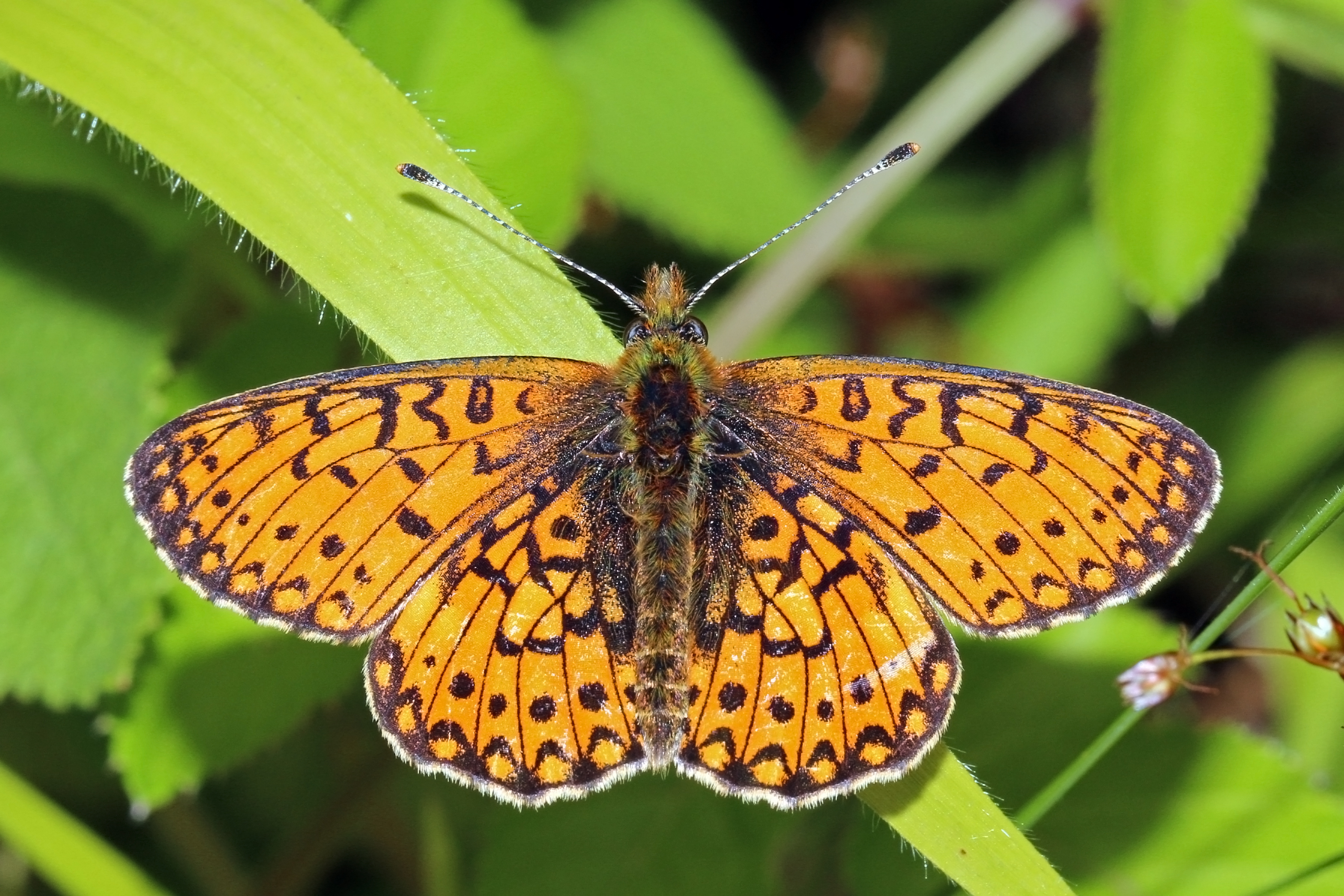
- male, Worcestershire, England
- female, Obrovisko, Slovakia

Scientific classification
- Kingdom: Animalia
- Phylum: Arthropoda
- Clade: Pancrustacea
- Class: Insecta
- Order: Lepidoptera
- Family: Nymphalidae
- Genus: Boloria
- Species: B. selene

Binomial name
- Boloria selene (Denis & Schiffermüller, 1775)

= Small pearl-bordered fritillary =

Species of butterfly

Boloria selene, known in Europe as the small pearl-bordered fritillary, is a species of butterfly of the family Nymphalidae. It is found across Europe, Asia and North America, and feeds exclusively on violets in its larval stages. This species prefers wet grassland habitats, where its larval food source, violets, are found. It overwinters in its larval stage, and eggs hatch in the late summer to early autumn. Members of this species are prey for multiple types of birds and other insects.

Due to modern agriculture, most of the grassland habitats that sustain Boloria selene are fragmented or lost all together in favor of farmland. Because of this, the small pearl-bordered fritillary has seen a serious drop in population across Europe, in some places as much as 80%. Factors including limited habitat range, low dispersal rate, and strong food specialization also contribute to population loss. Despite modern conservation efforts, the number of small pearl-bordered fritillaries is still declining. The North American populations appear to be affected in the same way, at least in the continental United States.

== Appearance ==
The small pearl-bordered fritillary is similar to the pearl-bordered fritillary but has black chevrons on the edge of its wings, a large central black dot on each wing, and white pearls on the underside. Males tend to be smaller than females, with a wingspan of 35 to 41 mm. Females are 38 to 44 mm in length. Though the small pearl-bordered fritillary is similar to the pearl-bordered fritillary it is much brighter in color because the pearl-bordered fritillary emerges from its pupa earlier. Seitz - A. selene Schiff. (= euphrosyne Bgstr., euphrasia Lew., silene Haw.) (67g). Forewing above and beneath very similar to tliat of the preceding [selenis]. Hindwing beneath with the median band distinct but not broad, the costal spot of the band, the large tooth above the apex of the cell and the one below the cell-end being vividly silvery like the marginal lunules; the broad interspace between the median band and the marginal lunules is leatheryellow and bears below the apex and above the anal angle two large dark cinnamon clouds; obsolescent silvery selenia bands extend from the costal and abdominal margins towards the centre of the wing.

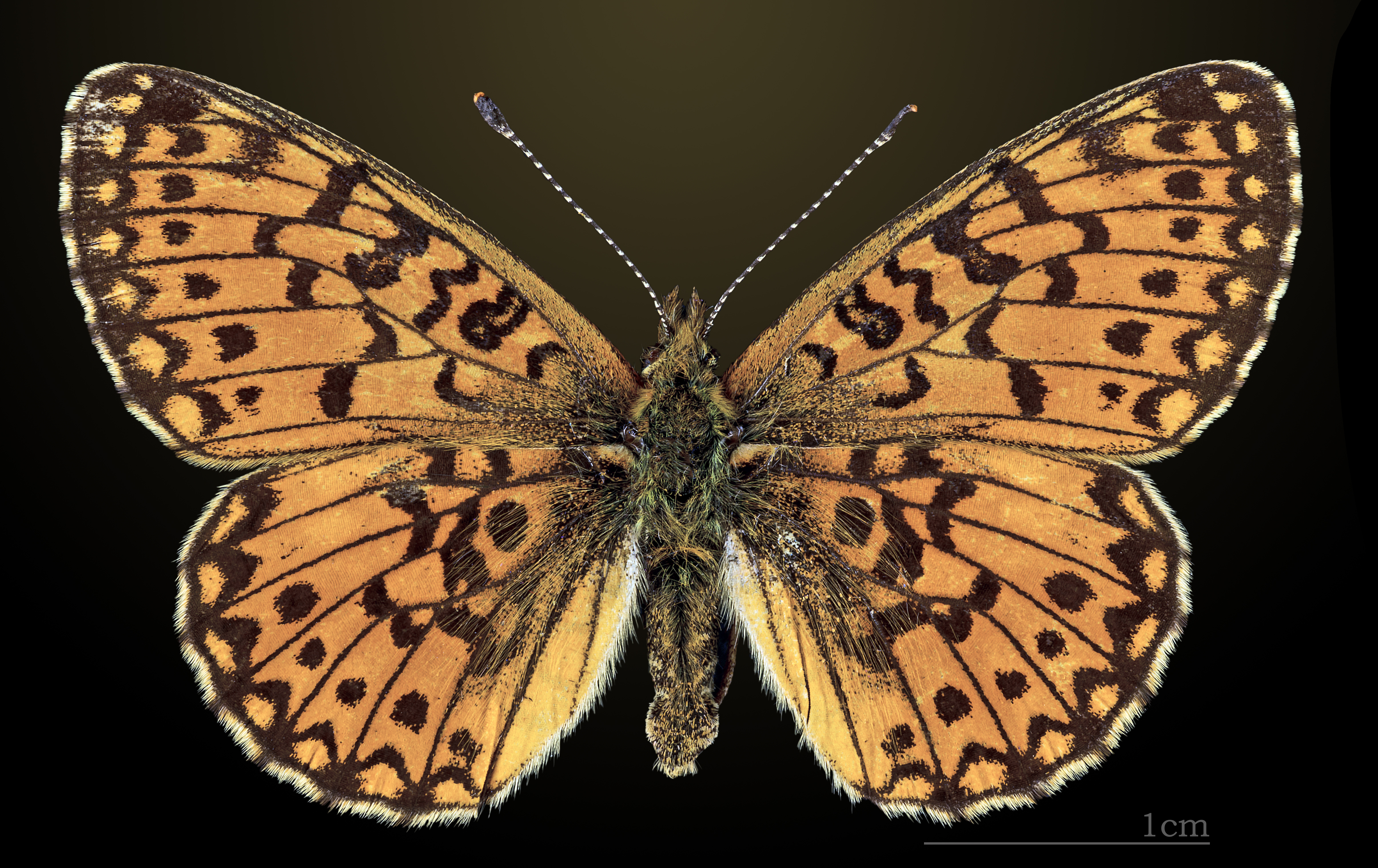
Dorsal side

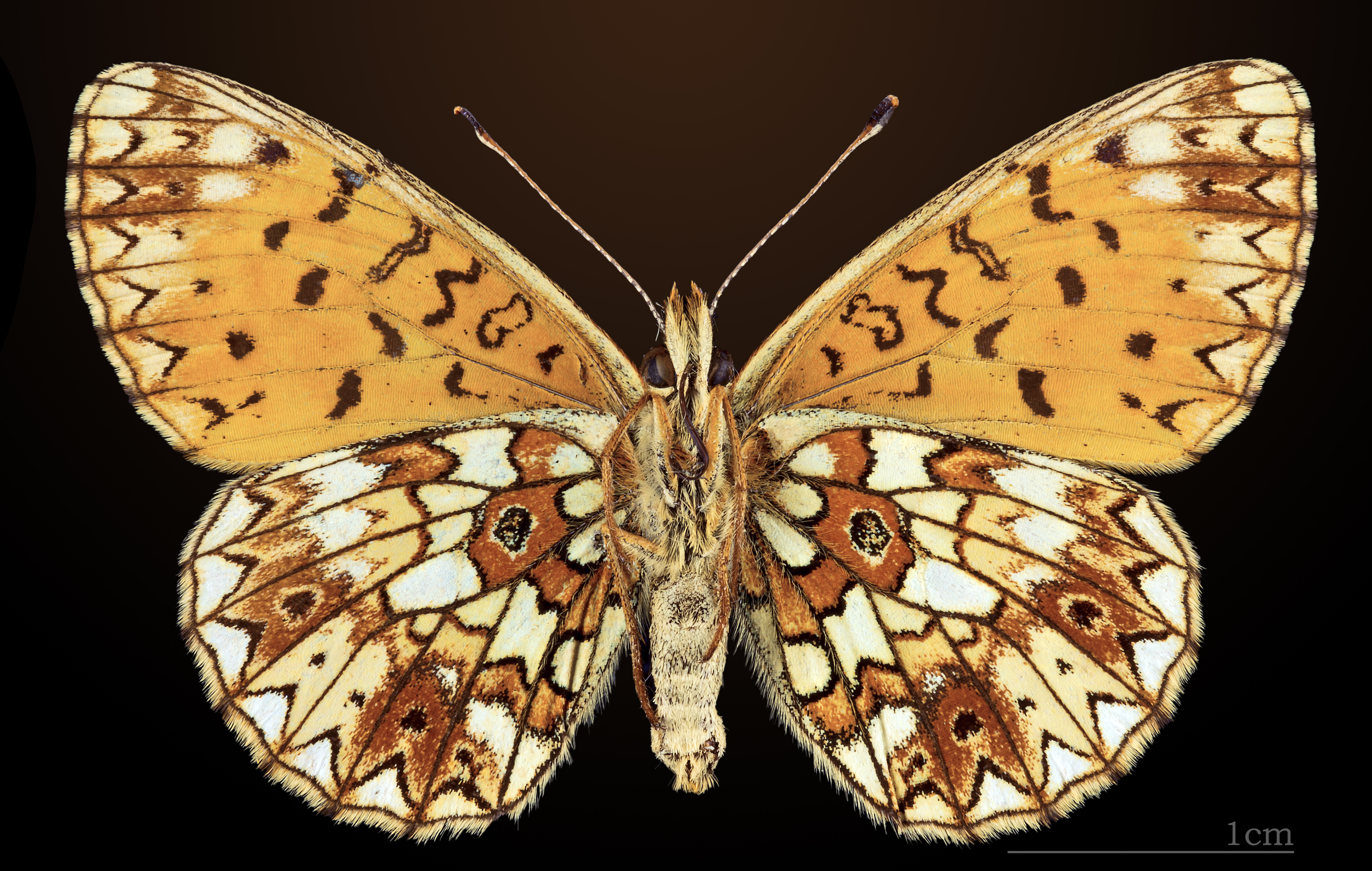
Ventral side

== Distribution ==
The species is widespread across central and northern Europe, North America, and through Asia to Korea. Specifically, it can be found in places like Germany, the United Kingdom, and Sweden and in the Midwestern United States in places like Iowa and the Dakotas. In the United Kingdom, Boloria selene is widespread across upland and western Britain, but is not found in central, eastern England or Ireland. Its range appears to be stable through much of Europe but declines have been reported in at least nine countries, including England.

This species is found across Europe and North America in grassland environments where native violets grow. It occurs in damp, grassy habitats, woodland clearings and moorland, but has also been found in dune slacks and coastal cliffs.

== Life cycle ==
=== Larva ===
The larvae of this species hatch in the late summer to early fall. They feed exclusively on violets and are active mostly at night. In drier areas, dog violets are used while in wetter areas the species feeds on bog violets (Viola palustris) or marsh violets growing among purple moor-grass or tufted hair-grass. They prefer the damper areas. They also occur among bracken, which provides shade for the appropriate violet species. The caterpillars overwinter by hibernating, and then reemerge in the spring to finish growth and pupate. However, recent studies have shown that times of laying, hatching, and reemerging vary by temperature, and all life cycle stages appear to be strongly linked to the timing of the seasons. This effect is a suspected form of plastic behavior seen in many species of insects, especially ones in temperate climates that experience large temperature changes due to a change in seasons.

=== Pupa ===
Caterpillars pupate between mid May and August. When the larvae forms the pupa, or chrysalis, it is formed with its head down. This transformative stage lasts about two to three weeks.

=== Adult ===
Adults mate and lay eggs in the spring on or in the near vicinity of violets. A common violet selected for oviposition is the marsh violet. Adult Boloria selene have been observed to fly in a brood once a year sometime in the summer. Adult small pearl-bordered fritillaries feed on the following plants:

- Bramble
- Thistle
- Bugle (Ajuga reptans)

== Migration habits ==
This species is well known to migrate short distances during its reproductive stage, but does not appear to make any long-distance migrations that cross over unsuitable habitats such as farmland and urban areas.

== Predators ==
Small birds appear to be major predators of both larval and adult stages, including introduced ground birds such as pheasants that were introduced in the UK for sport hunting (in quantities of almost 40 million birds according to a study done on ground birds' impact on local wildlife). However, no major decline was detected from the introduced predators alone, as there was no significance between reduced adult emergence and increased ground birds. In a study of ambush bugs, Boloria selene was identified as a prey, although predation rates were not studied.

== Genetics and local adaptation ==
A study using North American populations found that sibling mating events of this species almost always result in unviable offspring. Even hybrids that were crossed with individuals from parent populations often had unviable offspring. This indicates that this species requires non-kin mating to survive, which may help with decreasing inbreeding events. Certain larvae did better in their home environments and struggled in foreign environments, indicating potential local adaptation. There were also slight coloration changes between males in Massachusetts (a "warm leathery tone") and males in South Dakota (a "chestnut brown" color), indicating potential genetic differences between the two populations, which are separated by unsuitable habitat and by a distance of 2000 miles (3218.688 km). However, due to the age of the study, more work is needed to confirm that local adaptation is indeed taking place in North American populations of small pearl-bordered fritillaries instead of individual plasticity.

Another study found Boloria selene are quite plastic in their response to temperature variation, and will adjust much of their life cycle in response to temperature changes such as an earlier warming that comes with an early spring. The same study also analyzed among and between population data, and suggested that these animals quickly capitalize on early warming and late cooling regardless of location (in the US at least), and seem to also know when to wait longer or shorter before beginning reproduction.

== Conservation ==
There appears to be no place (at least in Europe) that is not suffering from at least light population degradation. Many studies in the UK (where population loss is most severe) and several studies from other areas of Europe state that the small pearl-bordered fritillary is rapidly declining in numbers. This is likely from indirect harm due to habitat destruction and fragmentation. Since this species is primarily attached to violet that grows in wild grasslands, modern agricultural practices which have caused most of Europe's grasslands to become fragmented or destroyed for farmland have a severe effect on the butterfly. Without native violets to host their larvae, this species is facing decline across Europe. This species also struggles with breeding across habitat fragments as it must lay eggs exclusively on violets in order to have any viable offspring. However, adults seem to be quite flexible in their movement patterns, with one study stating that only 45% of released Boloria selene specimens were able to be found and recaptured. This indicates that farmland itself appears to more strongly damage reproduction rates instead of general adult survival.

Another study found that this species has another characteristic which makes it vulnerable to extinction: it is not only a dietary specialist, also migrates only small distances. This creates problems for the species, since fragmentation most strongly affects animals that migrate short distances and are unable to cross the gaps made by human habitat destruction. While long distance migratory species are often unaffected and sedentary species are often able to better use the fragments they are in, short distance migrators like the small pearl-bordered fritillary are unable to properly disperse and are hit hardest from environmental damage.

A study in Germany found that over 40 years (1971–2011), populations of adults dropped rapidly on agricultural land, while dropping slightly less severely in native grasslands (although still decreasing by almost 83%). The article stated that fragmented habitat protection does a poor job of securing biodiversity and protecting many species that are in peril, as it does not account for many species that cannot seek extra fragmented breeding sites. Many species, including Boloria selene, fail to find good nesting sites as they cannot pass through the human habitat that divides suitable fragments.

These drastic changes stem from the continued expansion of agriculture over time that continued to damage and degrade the remaining native breeding habitat for Boloria selene. However, the species seems to fare well as adults in a variety of artificial and natural habitats, with the same study showing slightly larger numbers of the species in farmland than in wild habitat in 1971. Another big issue is that Boloria selene struggles with sibling mating, as shown when almost no viable offspring came from sibling mating. This could be detrimental to a population that already has reduced individual genetic diversity, as sibling mating will become more common as fragmentation chips away at short-distance migration and gene flow in this species.

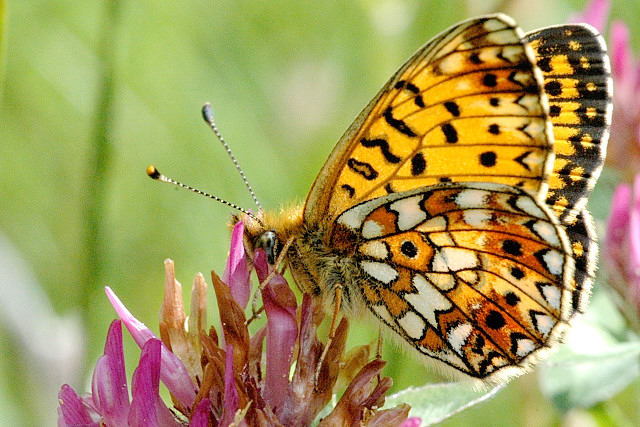
Ventral view

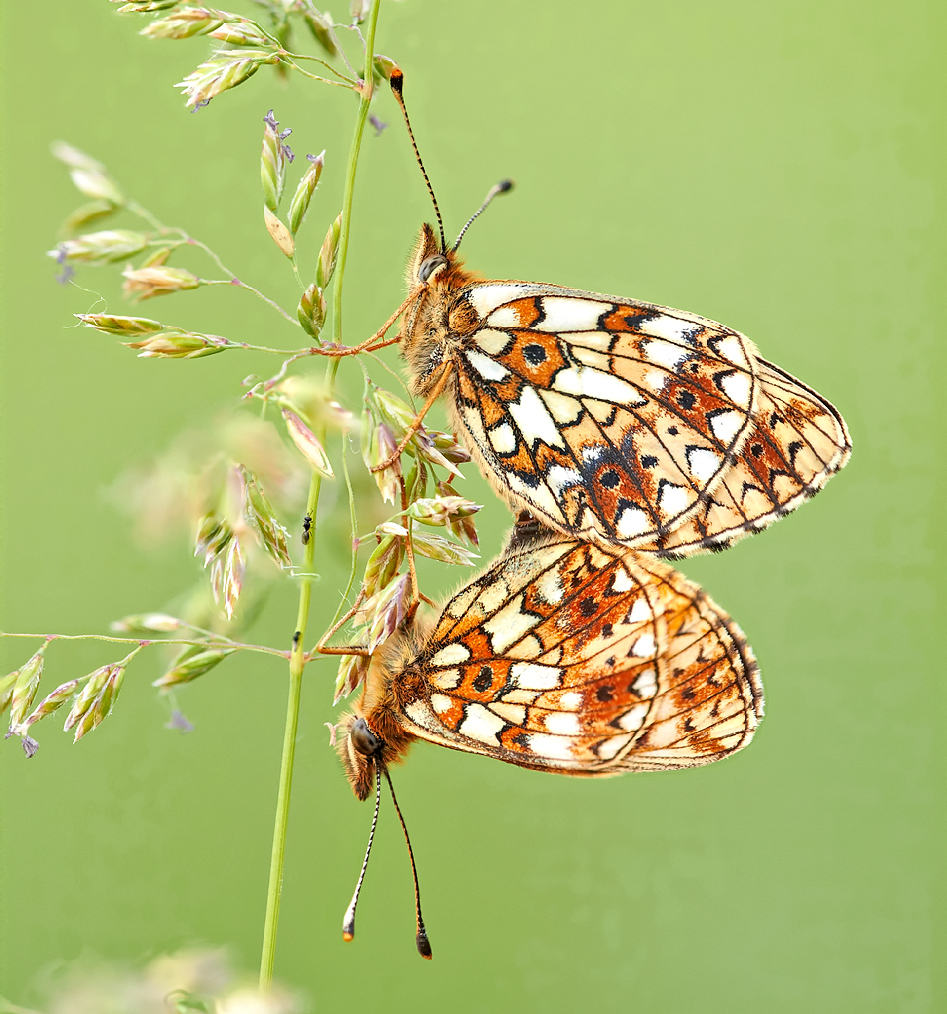
Mating

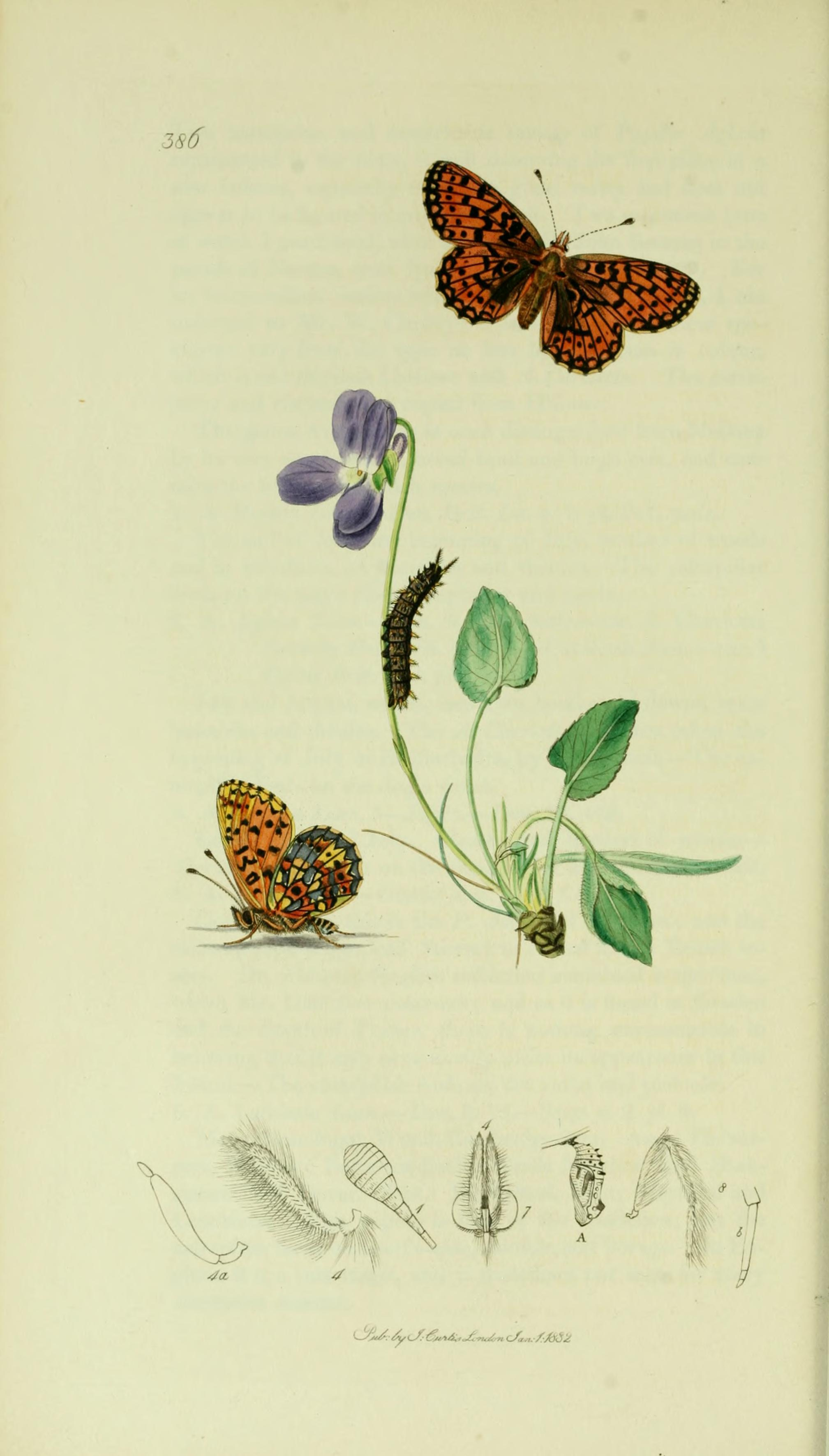
Illustration from John Curtis's British Entomology, Volume 5

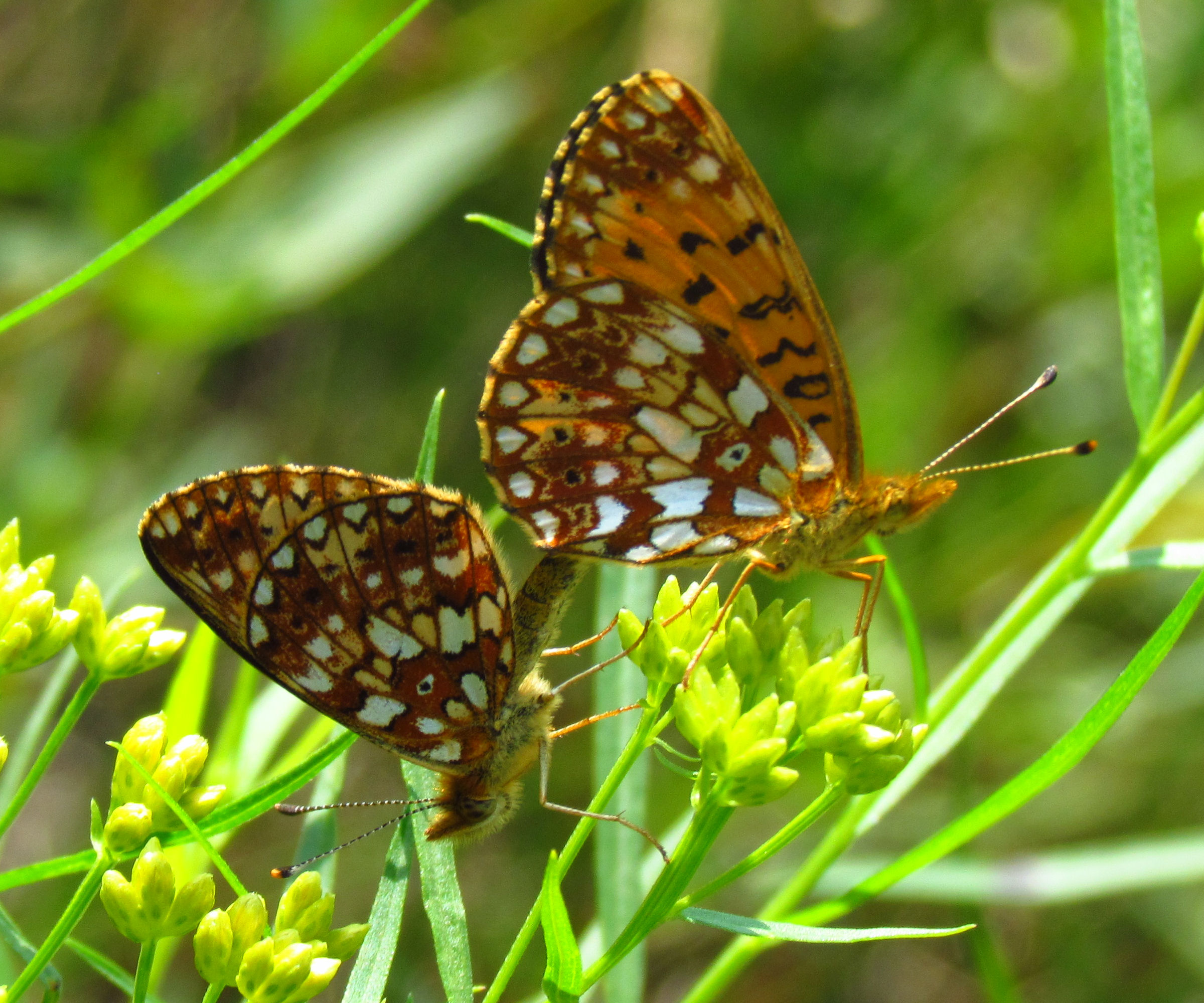
B. s. atrocostalis, mating, Ontario, Canada

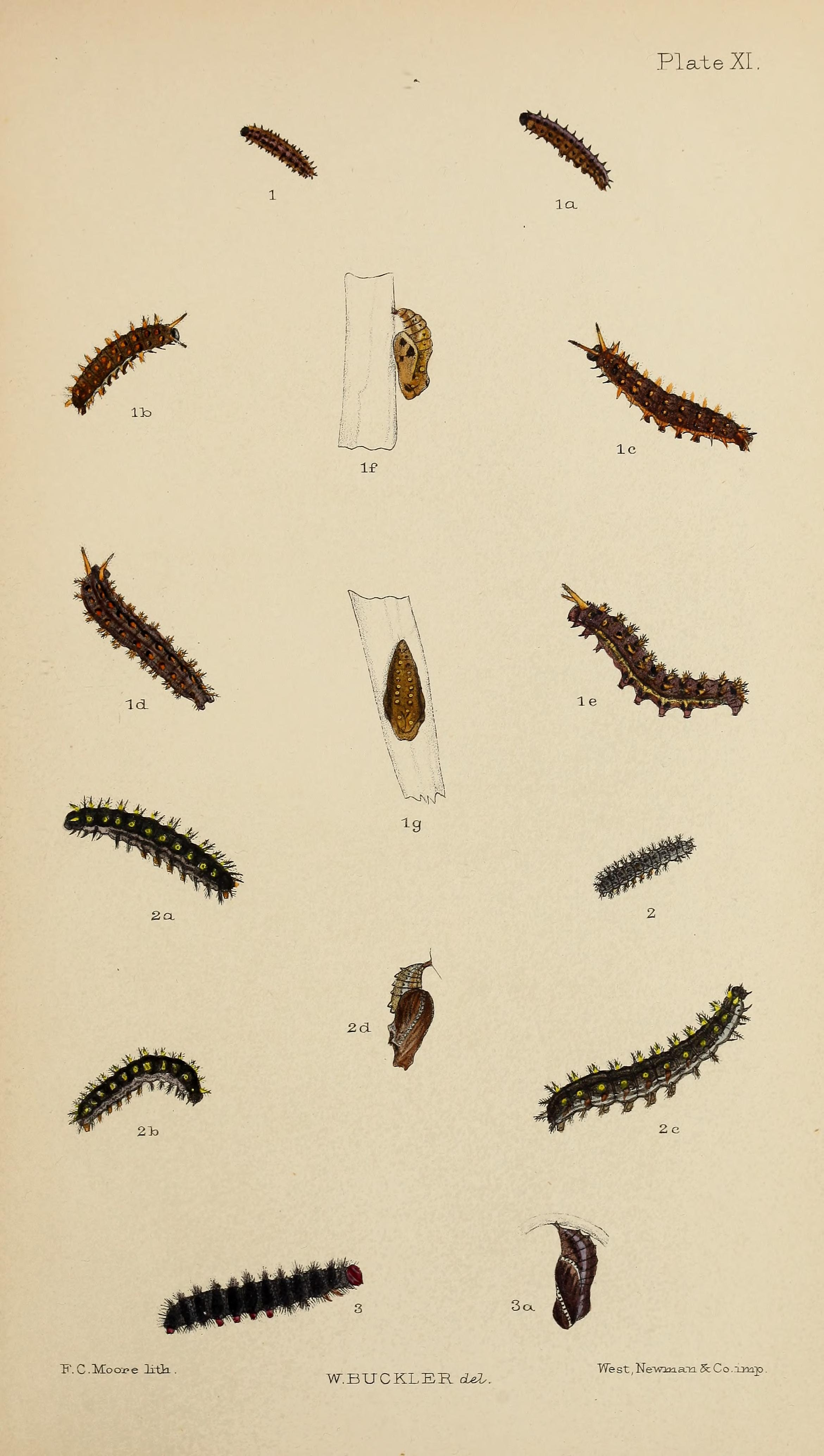
Figs 1 larva after 2nd moult, 1a larva after 3nd moult; 1b, 1c, 1d, 1e larva after 4th moult; 1f pupa side view; 1g pupa front view
