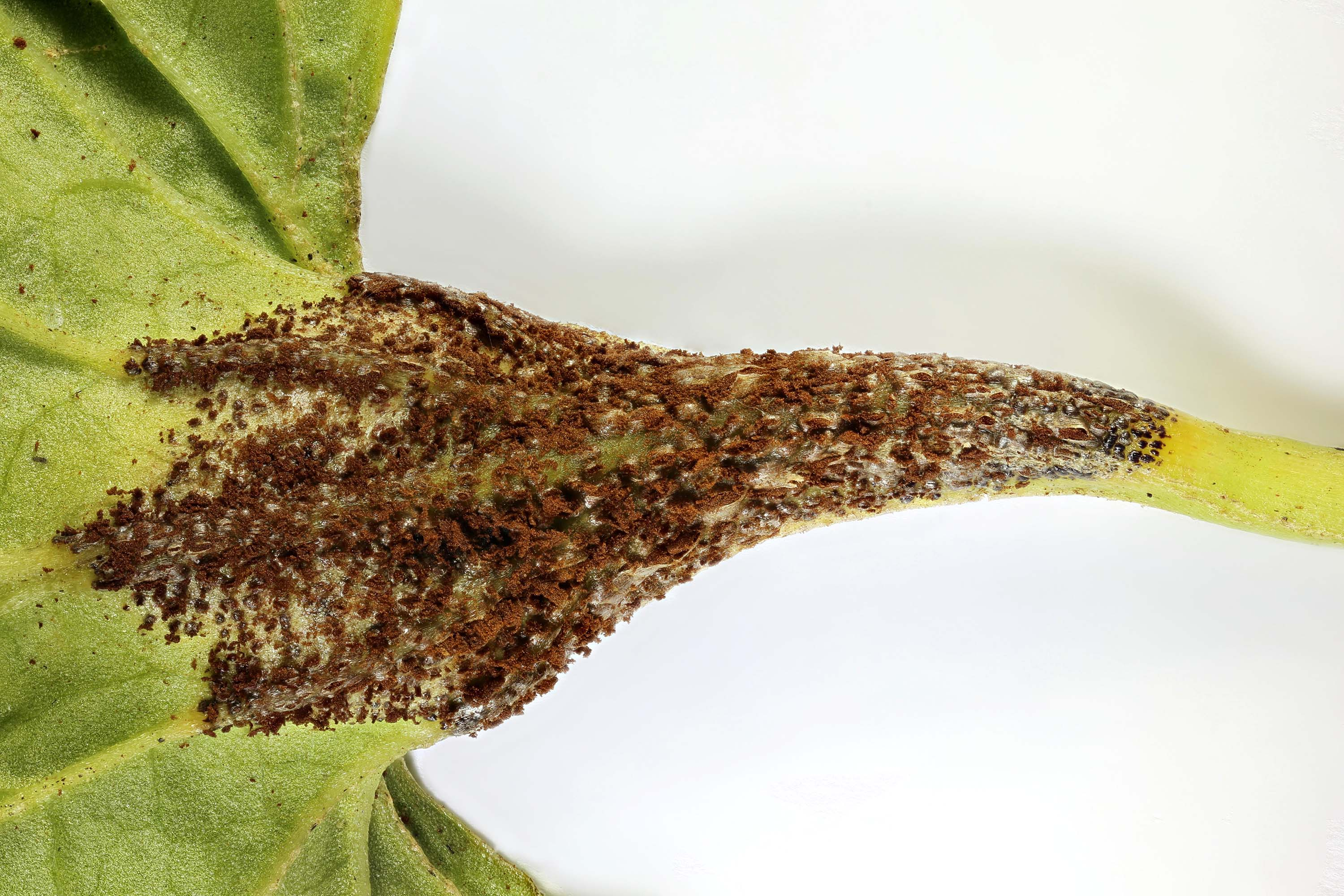
- P. fergusonii on a leaf of Viola palustris.

Scientific classification
- Kingdom: Fungi
- Division: Basidiomycota
- Class: Pucciniomycetes
- Order: Pucciniales
- Family: Pucciniaceae
- Genus: Puccinia
- Species: P. fergusonii

Binomial name
- Puccinia fergusonii Berk. & Broome (1875)

Synonyms
- Dasyspora fergussonii (Berk. & Broome) Arthur; Dicaeoma fergussonii (Berk. & Broome) Kuntze; Micropuccinia fergussonii (Berk. & Broome) Arthur & H.S. Jacks.; Micropuccinia fergussonii (Berk. & Broome) Arthur & H.S.Jacks.; Puccinia fergussonii var. hastata (Cooke) De Toni

= Puccinia fergussonii =

Species of fungus

Puccinia fergusonii is a plant pathogen that causes rust on Viola palustris. It is common in Iceland.

== See also ==
- List of Puccinia species
