= Rushmoor, Surrey =

Coordinates: 51.158°N 0.748665°W

Rushmoor
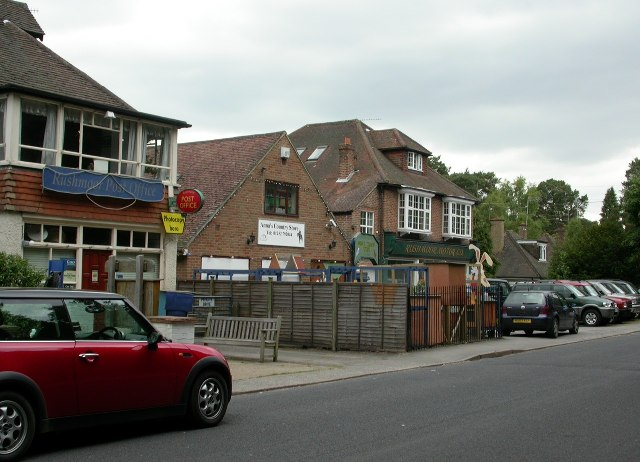
- The post office, country store and garage

- Location within Surrey
- Area: 0.6925 km^{2} (0.2674 sq mi)
- Population: 880 (2019 estimate)
  - Density: 1,271/km^{2} (3,290/sq mi)
- Civil parish: Frensham
- District: Waverley
- Shire county: Surrey
- Region: South East
- Country: England
- Sovereign state: United Kingdom

Rushmoor is a village in the civil parish of Frensham, in the Waverley district, in the county of Surrey, England. In 2019 it had an estimated population of 880.
