= More House School, Frensham =

Independent special school in Frensham, United Kingdom

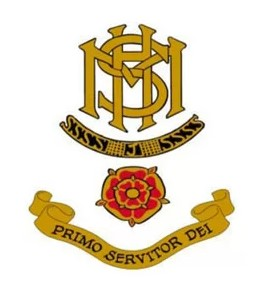

Location
- Farnham, Surrey, GU9 3AP; United Kingdom; 51.179036°N 0.798471°W

Information
- Former name: St Thomas More School
- School type: Special
- Motto: Primo Servitor Dei (First Servant Of God)
- Religious affiliation: Roman Catholic
- Established: 1939
- Founder: Joseph Gardner
- Status: Open
- Authority: Surrey (936)
- Category: Other independent special school
- Department for Education URN: 125403 Tables
- Headmaster: Jonathan Hetherington
- Years taught: 4-13
- Gender: Male
- Age range: 8-19
- Colour: Navy blue
- Website: morehouseschool.co.uk

More House School, Frensham is an independent specialist school located in Surrey. It educates boys aged 8–19 who have learning disabilities. Its headmaster is Jonathan Hetherington. The school has been rated 'Outstanding' in all categories by every Ofsted inspection since 2016.

== Overview ==
The school is Roman Catholic and takes both day boys and boarders. Most students are no longer Catholic and the religious routine has been relaxed. More House School, Frensham regularly ranks outstanding in Ofsted reports. The school's Charity number is 311872 and the name is GARD'NER MEMORIAL LIMITED. They have a total capacity of 200 staff and 760 students. The school currently has 515 students. It has 11 trustees. Most students have special educational needs and have an education, health and care plan (EHCP).

The school comprises three parts: a lower school for boys aged 8–13, an upper school for boys aged 13–16 and a sixth form for boys aged 16–18.

More House was featured in an ITV news report on special education in the UK as it is one of UK's largest special schools.

== History ==
The school started as the Mount Olivet Monastery which looked after boys classed as ‘mentally defective’ and ‘feeble-minded’ under the Mental Deficiency Act 1913. It was led by brother Joseph Gard'ner and the superior of the Basingstoke sisters. The monastery opened in December 1931 and by June 1932 sixteen young men were already being cared for. Later, the Home Office Board of Control didn't renew the licence of the institution and so in 1939 the community and institution were closed.

Brother Joseph then created the St. Thomas More school, which would concentrate on boys of normal intelligence that had difficulties learning, instead of 'mental defectives'. The school ran into financial trouble after Brother Joseph denounced the Anglo-Catholic movement so he, along with the school, was accepted into the Catholic Church by the Bishop of Southwark. In order to raise more funds, Brother Joseph started a circus and its first performance was on 1 July 1936. Initially the show ran for one week and each performance was for two and a quarter hours; they attracted approximately 1,300 spectators and a total of 50,000 over the wartime period. By the Trinity term of 1945 the school had around 50 boys. Brother Joseph died, aged 39, on 14 August 1947. In accordance with his wishes the circus died with him.

Valentine Roy Newbury was appointed as headmaster on 8 October 1957 and grew the school to a total of 80 boys. In 1961 the school changed its name to More House School and the company to Gard’ner Memorial Limited. In 1966 the school offered a full range of GCSEs and it was recognised as 'efficient' by the Department of Education and Science.

John Clarke Dawson was appointed as headmaster in 1968. He was the first headmaster to focus on speech and language therapy. and soon grew the schools size to 85 boys. On the morning of 13 July 1972 a fire broke out. The Farnham Herald reported that the fire had started in the staff room and that five dormitories, alongside the headmaster's house, were lost. All the boys escaped unharmed and by 1974, the rebuilding was completed.

In 1977 Mr Brian became headmaster. In 1983 the school applied for status as a 'special school' and by March 1984 the registration was complete. By Lent 1983 there were 100 boys in the school.

Mr Mullen became headmaster in 1989.

In 1993, Barry Hugget became headmaster. Over his tenure, the school would increase its roll to 470 boys from having been 90 in 1993. In 2012 a sixth form was added and construction started on a sixth form wing. For a short time the school had go-cart races down the hill until a boy crashed into a pavilion and another into some watching parents. Princess Alexandra attended the school to open the Bradbury multi-activity and creative arts centre on 6 November 2002. On 9 November 2011, the school received a call threatening to commit a school shooting and bombing. 700 pupils and members of staff were evacuated to the gymnasium, which was secured by armed police. Later a 16-year-old boy was arrested on suspicion of making threats to kill and communicating a bomb hoax. He had used a pay-as-you-go mobile to make the threat but was identified after a fourth call was made. In 2012, a time capsule was planted by pupils in the site.

In 2015 Mr Hetherington was appointed headmaster. More House has developed links through charitable donations, to the Shia primary school, near the city of Moshi in Tanzania.

=== Franchising ===
In 2013 More House considered buying the Stanbridge Earls school which had shut down due to financial difficulties. This was not followed through as the school did not want to risk its finances. Opening a school in Dubai or Saudi Arabia has been considered, and talks were held with the respective governments. However, they too, failed.

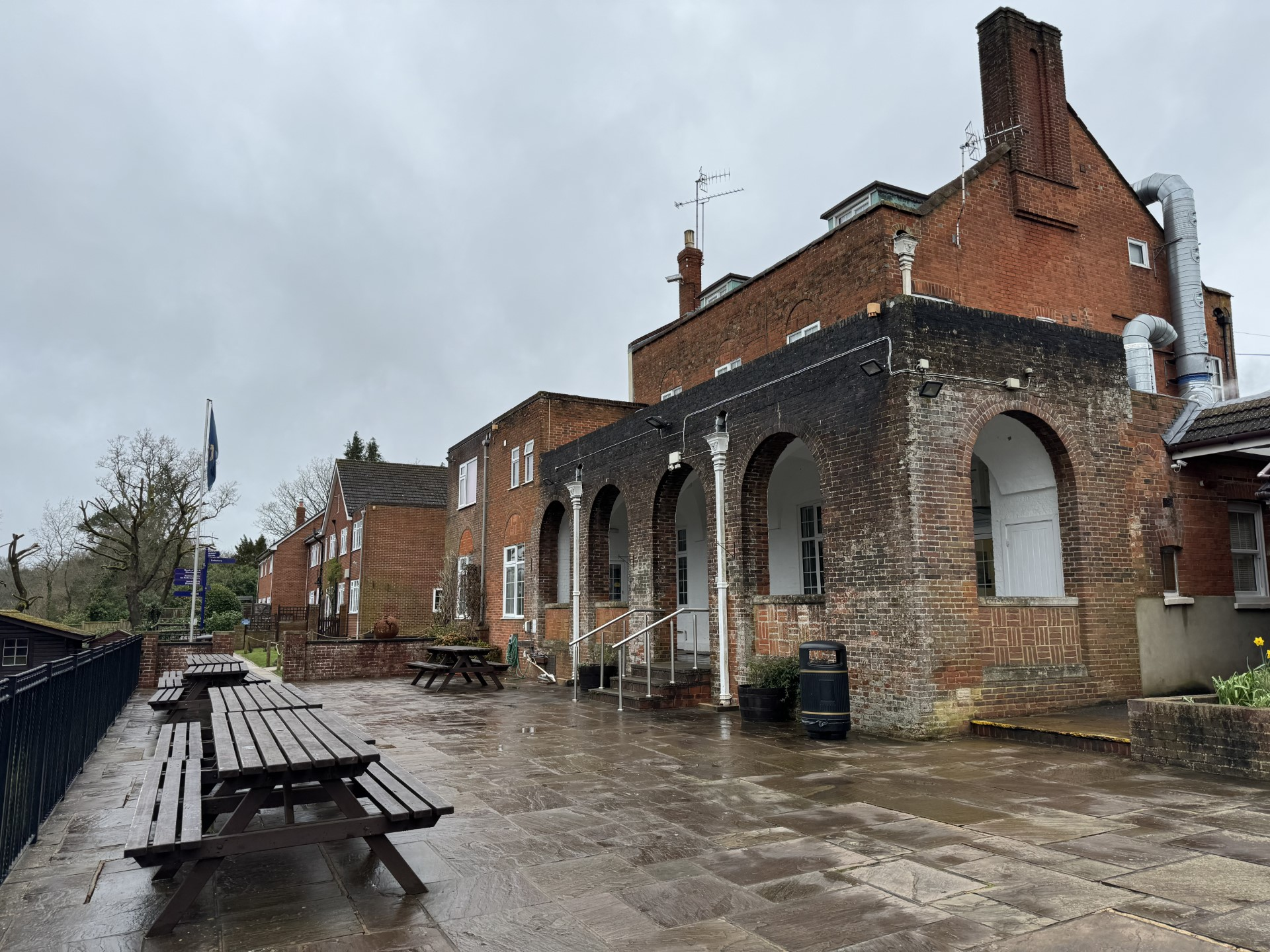

== Location ==
The school is located in Frensham, Surrey and the nearest major town is Farnham. The Regional schools commissioner region is South-East England and South London, the Government office region is South East, the district is Waverley and the Ward is Farnham Wrecclesham and Rowledge. The local authority is Surrey (936).

== Facilities ==
The school has a chapel, a technology workshop and a swimming pool.

As of late 2025 the school has announced its interests for an Astro-turf facility on the field in line with a funding campaign.

== Notable alumni ==
- Dylan Llewellyn
