= Mother Ludlam's Cave =

Cave in Surrey, England

Coordinates: 51.2043°N 0.7549°W

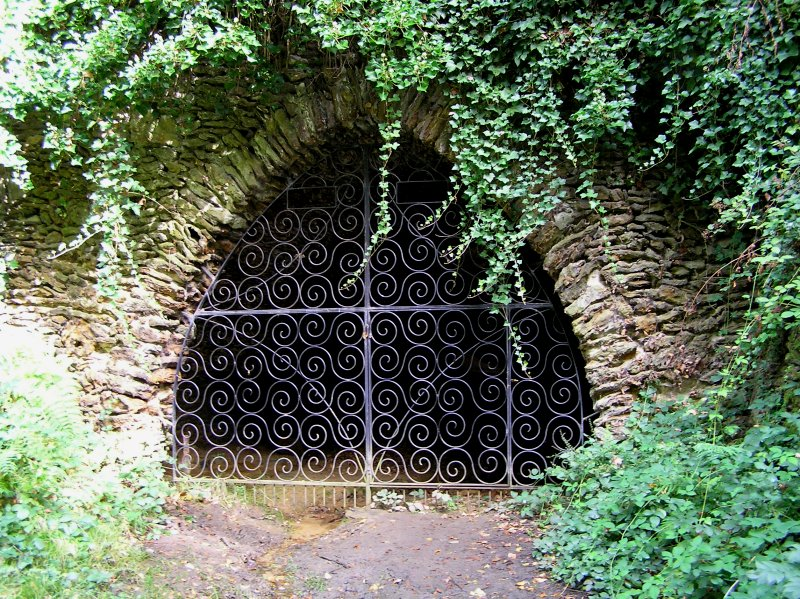
The entrance to Mother Ludlam's Cave, photographed in 2005

Mother Ludlam's Cave, also known as Mother Ludlum's Cave or Mother Ludlum's Hole, is a small cave in the sandstone cliff of the Wey Valley at Moor Park, near Farnham, Surrey, in England. The cave is the subject of a number of local legends.

A spring rising in the cave is recorded in the 13th century "Annals of Waverley Abbey" as "Ludewell"; other spellings through history include "Ludwell" and "Luddwelle". A monk named Symon is credited with identifying the spring as a suitable water supply for Waverley Abbey in 1218, after the original source had dried up. The brothers of the abbey dedicated the spring to St Mary, so it also became known as St Mary's Well. The cave has been naturally formed by the spring but may have been enlarged by the monks and was made into a grotto (possibly during the eighteenth century) and further enhanced by addition of an ironstone arched entrance, possibly during the reign of Queen Victoria.

The cave was explored and surveyed at around 200 feet long in 1945 and as 192 feet to a recent roof collapse in 1961.

== Origins of the name ==
According to the information panel erected at the cave by Waverley Borough Council the name Ludwell can be traced back to the Celtic language, and means "bubbling spring". John Aubrey visited the area in 1673 and was informed that Ludwell was named after Lud, King of the South Saxons, who went there to bathe his wounds after a battle. A story originating with the Norman-Welsh writer of historicised legends Geoffrey of Monmouth has Ludd, Lud or Llud as the ruler of Celtic Britain. Geoffrey suggested that London, originally called Trinovantum, was renamed for King Lud and known as Lud's Dun (Dun is celtic for Castle or Hillfort) which became London. The western gate of the City of London is called Ludgate.

Archaeologists have found nothing to suggest these stories are based on fact. A modern ethnographer would identify Lud as a Celtic god. There are numerous toponyms in England and a very few in Ireland. He is also known as the Celtic god of healing thus Celtic-speaking people must have known of the spring but whether they considered it a sacred spring long before the monks of nearby Waverley Abbey used it as a source of fresh water and rededicated it to St Mary (the Holy Mother) is unknown. The "Lud" element of the name is maintained in the latest adaptation, "Mother Ludlam". Alternatively, the name may be derived from Anglo-Saxon "hlūd well," meaning "a loud, noisy spring."

== The legend of Mother Ludlam, the White Witch of Waverley ==
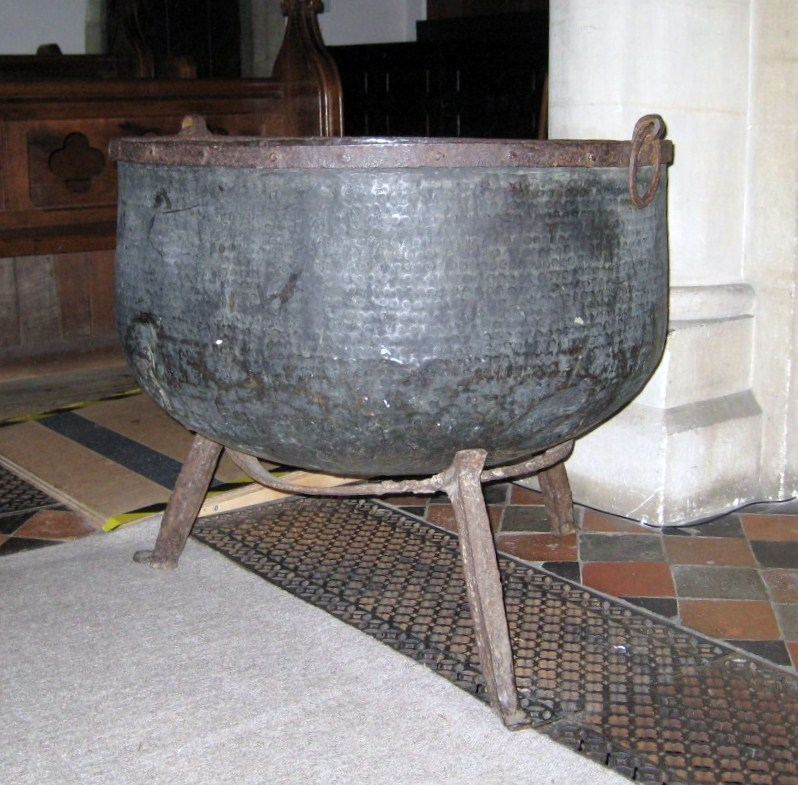
Mother Ludlam's Cauldron in Frensham church

The cave has long been associated with the legend of "Mother Ludlam" who was, supposedly, a white witch who lived in the cave. The earliest versions of the legend, such as that recorded by John Aubrey in 1673 in his Natural History and Antiquities of Surrey, make no mention of a witch and it is likely that the story was originally associated with fairies.

Various versions of the legend have existed. The simplest version is that Mother Ludlam would loan utensils and that a large cauldron was borrowed but not returned; she became enraged and the borrower, scared by her anger, sought refuge in Frensham Church. The cauldron associated with this legend remains in the church to this day, but is believed by historians to have been used for brewing church ale in past times – made of hammered copper and measuring three feet in diameter and 19 inches deep, it is of the type that was commonly used in the Middle Ages for catering at parishioners' weddings and religious festivals.

As recorded in 1937 the legend is that one day the Devil, in disguise, had visited Mother Ludlam and asked to borrow the cauldron she used for mixing her potions. Recognising the Devil from his hoof-prints in the sand, she refused, so the Devil stole the cauldron, with the witch in pursuit. Making great leaps, the Devil created a series of hills where he touched the ground, these now being the sandstone hills near Churt, known as the Devil's Jumps. The Devil dropped the cauldron – or kettle – on the last of these hills, "Kettle Bury", or "Kettlebury Hill". Mother Ludlam recovered the cauldron and placed it in Frensham Church, where it would be safe from the Devil.

Another version, recorded in the 1920s, is that the cauldron could be borrowed by climbing the highest of the Devil's Jumps (known as Stony Jump), and whispering to the fairies who lived there through a hole in the rocky outcrop on the summit. A borrower failed to return it on time, so the fairies condemned the borrower to have the cauldron follow him wherever he went. Distressed by the presence of his pursuer, he sought sanctuary in Frensham Church where he collapsed and died, leaving the cauldron trapped inside.

== William Cobbett ==
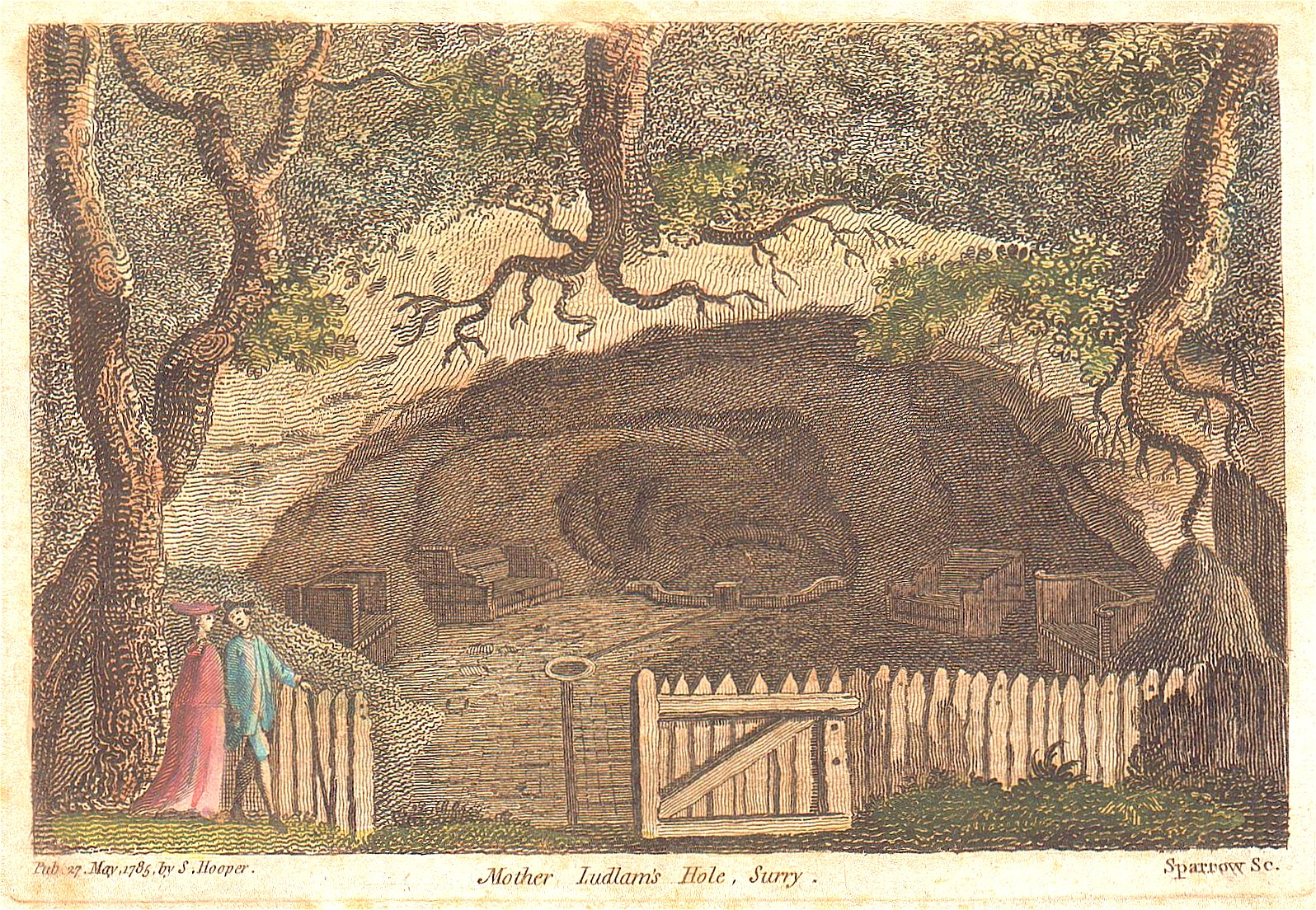
The cave in an engraving, published in 1785, showing how it looked at the time of Francis Grose's visit, as described by William Cobbett

William Cobbett wrote of the cave in his Rural Rides, recounting his visit of 27 October 1825:

From Waverley we went to Moore Park, once the seat of Sir William Temple, and, when I was a very little boy, the seat of a lady or a Mrs Temple. Here I showed Richard "Mother Ludlum's Hole"; but, alas! it is not the enchanting place that I knew it, nor that which Grose describes in his Antiquities! The semicircular paling is gone; the basins to catch the never-ceasing little stream are gone; the iron cups, fastened by chains, for people to drink out of, are gone; the pavement all broken to pieces; the seats, for people to sit on, on both sides of the cave, torn up, and gone; the stream that ran down a clean paved channel, now making a dirty gutter; and the ground opposite, which was a grove, chiefly of laurels, intersected by closely-mowed grass walks, now become a poor ragged-looking alder-coppice.

The cave is now in an even more dire state of repair following collapse of part of its roof during the drought of 1976, which also affected the floor of the cave by covering the remaining signs of habitation with a large mound of sand.

== Wildlife ==
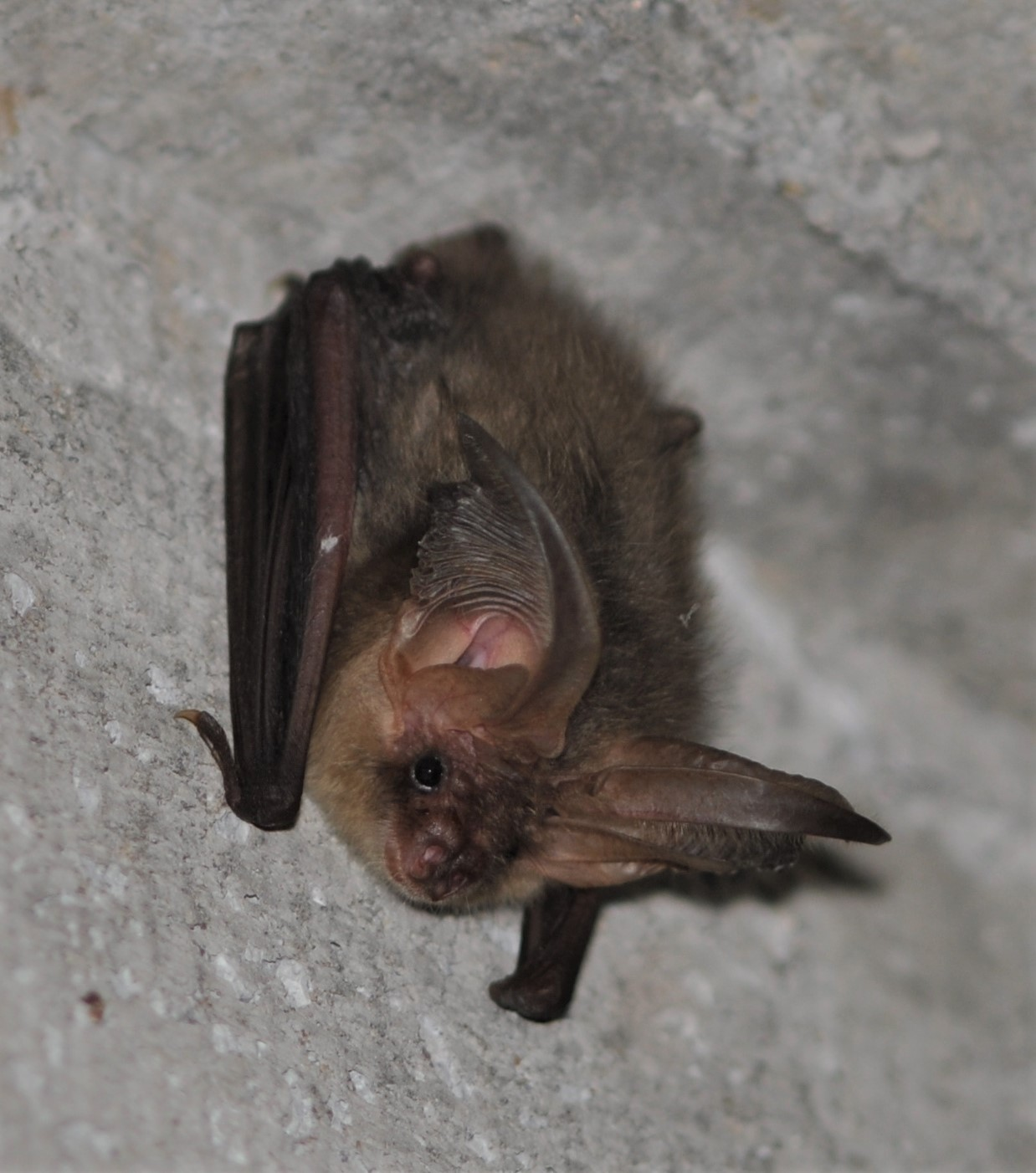
Long-eared Bat

The cave provides a roost for a variety of bat species: Natterer's Bat (Myotis nattereri), Daubenton's Bat (M. daubentonii) and Long-eared Bat (Plecotus auritus) exist in some numbers. Conservation efforts are now encouraging a return of the Greater Horseshoe Bat (Rhinolophus ferrumequinum). The entrance to the cave has been the subject of a partnership project between Waverley Borough, English Nature, and Farnham Town Council in 2001/2002, to provide a replacement for an earlier, damaged, ornamental grille to protect the cave and the bat roost. English Nature has a design for a low cost bat grille for the hole in the cave roof. Opposite the cave entrance is the Moor Park Nature Reserve of the Surrey Wildlife Trust, which is an SSSI consisting mainly of alder carr.

== Father Foote's Cave ==
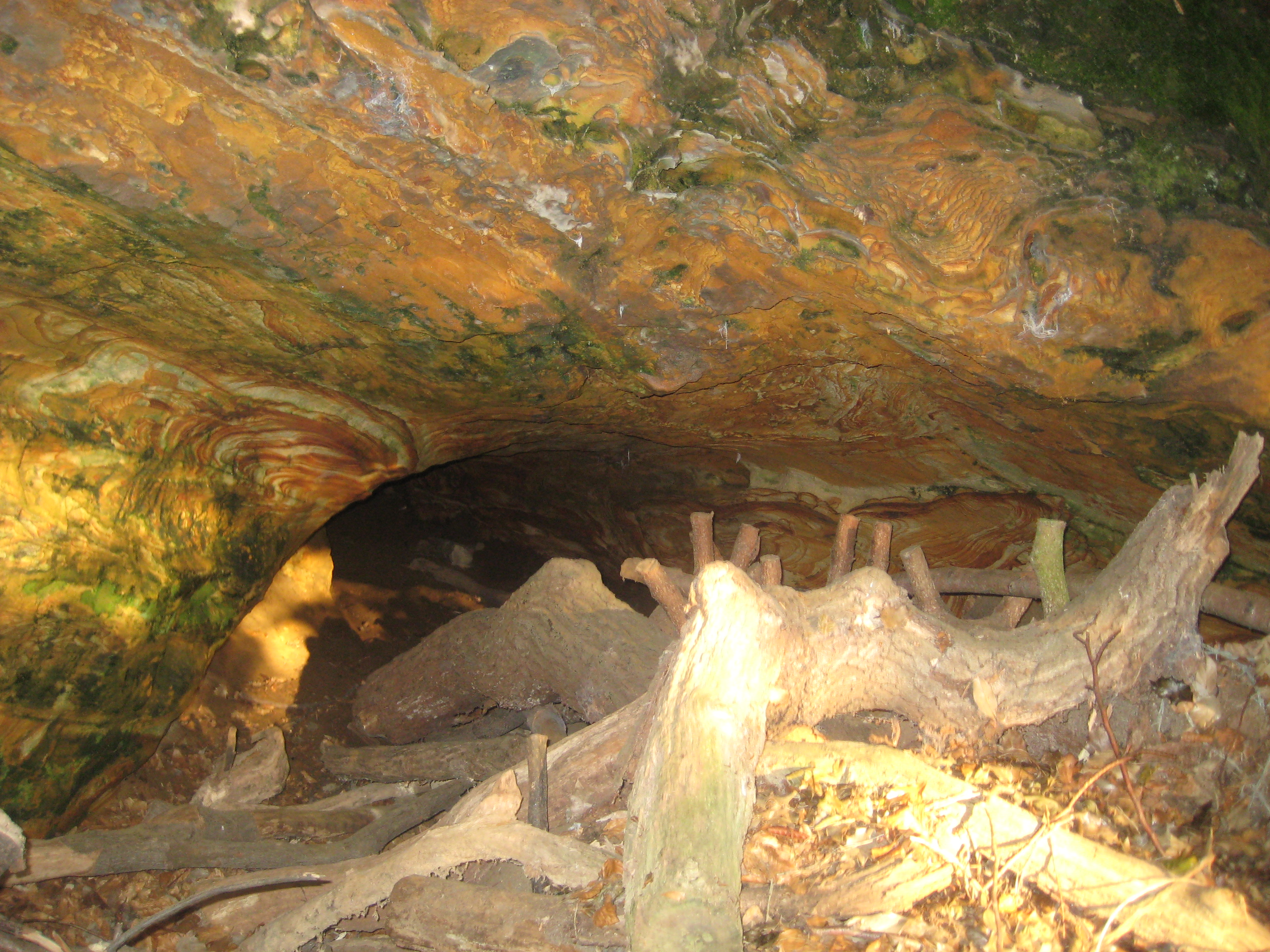
Father Foote's Cave

Above Mother Ludlam's Cave is another, smaller, cave known as Father Foote's Cave, which is the subject of another story. A man named Foote allegedly dug the cave and took shelter here, having previously stayed at the Seven Stars inn in Farnham for a while. He was found lying, unwell, one day by the stream. He was taken to Farnham workhouse, where he died the same day in 1840. His last words were "Take me to the cave again". How his name became transmuted to Father Foote is not recorded.
