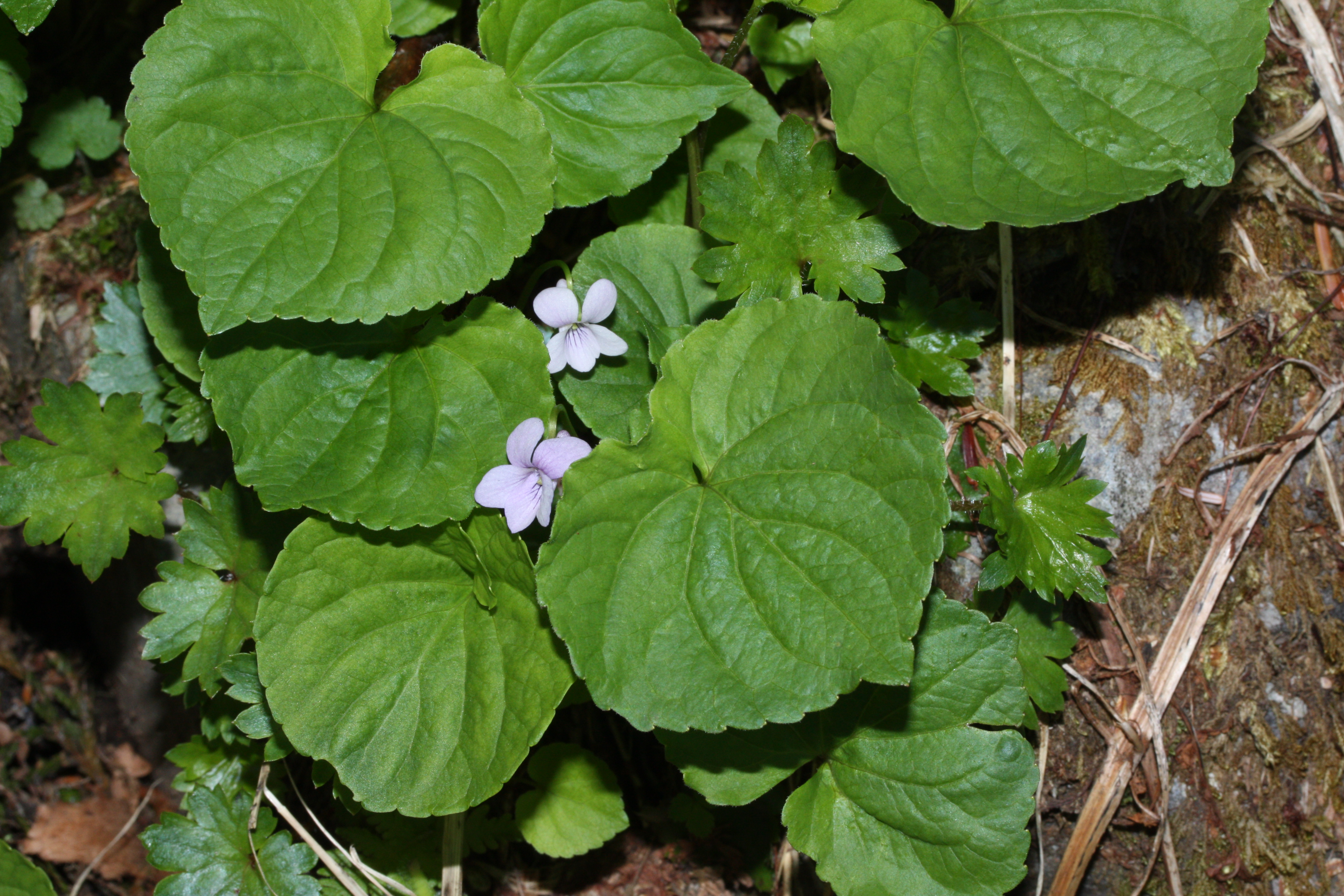

Conservation status
- Least Concern (IUCN 3.1)

Scientific classification
- Kingdom: Plantae
- Clade: Tracheophytes
- Clade: Angiosperms
- Clade: Eudicots
- Clade: Rosids
- Order: Malpighiales
- Family: Violaceae
- Genus: Viola
- Species: V. palustris

Binomial name
- Viola palustris L.

Subspecies
- V. p. subsp. juressi; V. p. subsp. palustris

Synonyms
- List: Viola inodora; Viola juressi; Viola pallens; Viola paludosa; Viola pubifolia; Viola pubinervis

= Viola palustris =

Species of flowering plant

Viola palustris (marsh violet or alpine marsh violet) is a perennial forb of the genus Viola. It inhabits moist meadows, marshes, and stream banks in northern parts of North America and Eurasia. The species epithet palustris means "marsh-loving".

== Description ==
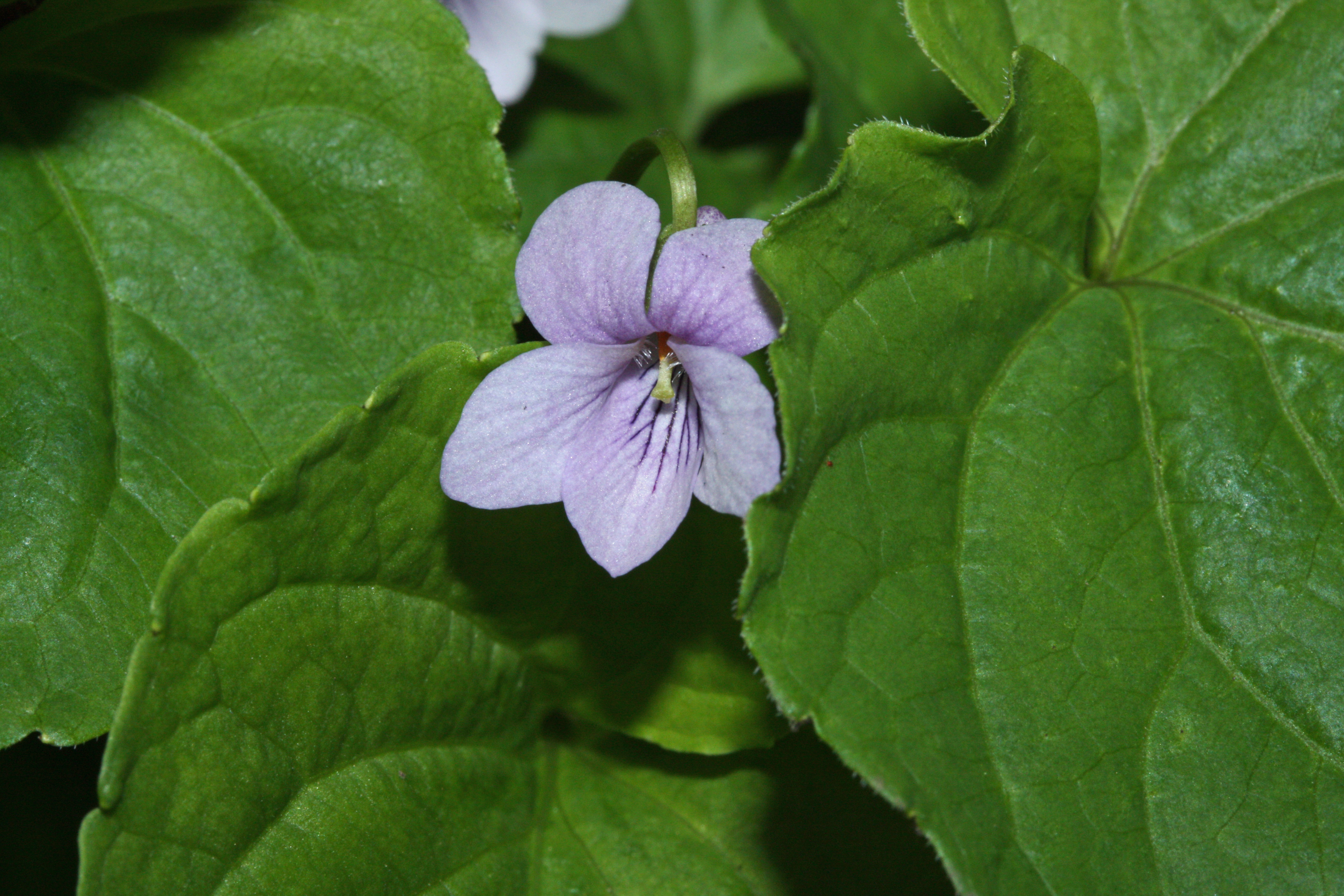
The lateral petals are lightly bearded. The lobed stigma is glabrous.

Viola palustris is a perennial plant that grow to 3 to 21.5 centimeters (1.2 to 8.5 in). During the summer they often form small colonies connected together by pale stolons that root frequently and that are leafy at the nodes. Plants will also have slender and fleshy rhizomes, modified underground stems.

All the leaves are basal, attached to the base of the plant rather than to stems, by hairless petioles that are 1 to 17 centimeters (0.39 to 6.7 in) long. The leaves do not have lobes, but do have hairless edges that are crenulate, a very fine rounded tooth edge. Their shape varies between reniform, ovate, and orbiculate; like a kidney with an indentation on the side of the leaf attachment, egg shaped with the wider portion towards the base, and circular in shape. They are 0.5–6.4 cm long and 0.5–5.5 cm wide and more or less as long as wide.

The flowers are usually lilac, pale blue, or pale violet on both sides, but are sometimes very pale approaching white. They measure 10 to 13 millimeters across.

The bottom middle petal and sometimes the two petals to either side have violet floral guides. The lateral pair are lightly bearded.

== Taxonomy ==
Viola palustris was given its scientific name by Carl Linnaeus in 1753. It has two accepted subspecies, juressi and the autonym palustris. It is part of the genus Viola in the family Violaceae.

The species has 29 synonyms of the species or one of its two subspecies.

Table of Synonyms
Name	Year	Rank	Synonym of:	Notes
Viola inodora Gilib.	1782	species	subsp. palustris	= het., opus utique oppr.
Viola juressi Link ex Cout.	1892	species	subsp. juressi	≡ hom.
Viola macloskeyi subsp. pallens (Banks ex Ging.) M.S.Baker	1953	subspecies	subsp. palustris	= het.
Viola macloskeyi var. pallens (Banks ex Ging.) C.L.Hitchc.	1961	variety	subsp. palustris	= het.
Viola pallens (Banks ex Ging.) Brainerd	1905	species	subsp. palustris	= het.
Viola paludosa Clairv.	1811	species	subsp. palustris	= het.
Viola palustris var. angustata Wahlenb.	1826	variety	subsp. palustris	= het.
Viola palustris proles bourgaei Rouy	1908	proles	subsp. palustris	= het.
Viola palustris subsp. brevipes M.S.Baker	1936	subspecies	subsp. palustris	= het.
Viola palustris var. brevipes (M.S.Baker) R.J.Davis	1951	variety	subsp. palustris	= het.
Viola palustris var. dimorpha Rouy & Foucaud	1896	variety	subsp. palustris	= het.
Viola palustris subsp. epipsila Rouy & Foucaud	1896	subspecies	subsp. palustris	= het.
Viola palustris subsp. herminii (Wein) Samp.	1935	subspecies	subsp. palustris	= het.
Viola palustris f. herminii (Wein) Franco & P.Silva	1950	form	subsp. palustris	= het.
Viola palustris proles herminii Wein	1906	proles	subsp. palustris	= het.
Viola palustris var. integrifolia Caball.	1947	variety	subsp. palustris	= het.
Viola palustris proles juressi (Link ex Cout.) Samp.	1909	proles	subsp. juressi	≡ hom.
Viola palustris f. juressi (Link ex Cout.) Samp.	1911	form	subsp. juressi	≡ hom.
Viola palustris var. leimonia J.K.Henry	1915	variety	subsp. palustris	= het.
Viola palustris f. minor Nyman ex Cout.	1926	form	subsp. palustris	= het., nom. illeg.
Viola palustris var. pensylvanica Ging.	1824	variety	subsp. palustris	= het.
Viola palustris subsp. pubifolia E.Kuta	1991	subspecies	subsp. palustris	= het.
Viola palustris var. rubra Gray	1821	variety	subsp. palustris	= het.
Viola palustris subsp. typica M.S.Baker	1936	subspecies	V. palustris	≡ hom., not validly publ.
Viola palustris f. uliginosa Welw. ex Merino	1913	form	subsp. palustris	= het., nom. illeg.
Viola palustris var. uliginosa Fr.	1817	variety	subsp. palustris	= het.
Viola pubifolia (E.Kuta) G.H.Loos	2010	species	subsp. palustris	= het.
Viola pubinervis Rehmann & Woł.	1893	species	subsp. palustris	= het.
Viola rotundifolia var. pallens Banks ex Ging.	1824	variety	subsp. palustris	= het.
Notes: ≡ homotypic synonym; = heterotypic synonym

=== Names ===
The species name, palustris, is listed in texts about Botanical Latin with the meaning "marsh loving". It is known by the common names marsh violet or alpine marsh violet. It is also sometimes called the northern marsh violet.

== Range and habitat ==
Marsh violets are native to Europe and North America as well as a small area in northern Africa and a portion of western Asia. In Asia it grows just in Western Siberia in Russia. To the east in Europe it is native to almost every country, but is absent from southern Russia, Crimea in Ukraine, European Turkey, Albania, the islands of Sicily, Sardinia, the archipelago of Svalbard, and the Balearic Islands. It is recorded as locally extinct in Hungary. They are found in the Azores in the Atlantic Ocean.

In north America their range includes Greenland and most of Canada except for the Yukon, Nova Scotia, New Brunswick, and Prince Edward Island. In the western United States it grows in mountainous areas of Washington, Oregon, northern coastal California, Idaho, Montana, and Wyoming. It also grows in parts of Nevada and Utah and is reported without specific locations in Arizona, Colorado, and South Dakota. It also has been recorded by the Natural Resources Conservation Service as native to the northeastern states of New York, Vermont, New Hampshire, and Maine.

Marsh violets grow in marshes, fens, swamps, wet forests, and along stream banks. They grow at sea level all the way to 1,800 meters (5,900 ft) in elevation.

== Ecology ==
It is used as a larval foodplant by the pearl-bordered fritillary (Boloria euphrosyne) and the small pearl-bordered fritillary (Boloria selene), though the small pearl-bordered fritillary prefers the marsh violet and the pearl-bordered fritillary prefers common dog-violet (Viola riviniana). It is also used as a host plant by the dark green fritillary (Speyeria aglaja). It is a known host for Hendersonia violae and Puccinia fergussonii, two pathogenic fungi.
