= Weyfest =

- Dates: Mid to late August
- Frequency: Annually
- Inaugurated: 2004
- Most recent: 2024
- Website: www.weyfest.co.uk

Weyfest was an annual music festival held at the Rural Life Centre in Tilford, Surrey, England. It usually occurred around mid/end of August.

Music was performed from the 3 outdoor stages and an indoor stage. Crafts, stalls, other entertainment and the exhibits of the Rural Life Centre as well as a campsite. Weyfest had earned a good reputation for abundant clean toilets, a large variety of fairly priced high quality food & reasonable bar prices and a safe and friendly family environment. The festival also offered pitches for all types of camping, tents, campervans, caravans and motorhomes, and even Electric Hook Up (EHU) if required. It had been voted one of the UK's top festivals by Planet Rock (radio station) listeners and the Daily Telegraph.

== History ==
The 2004 edition was held as a three-day event at the Holly Bush Public House, Frensham, and raised funds for Treloar's. Following a change of licensee, the 2005 edition was held at the same venue as a two-day event to raise funds for Lord Mayor Treloar's College, and was restricted to 500 tickets.

In 2006, the event took place in the grounds of the Exchange Hotel, Farnham, moving inside in the evening.

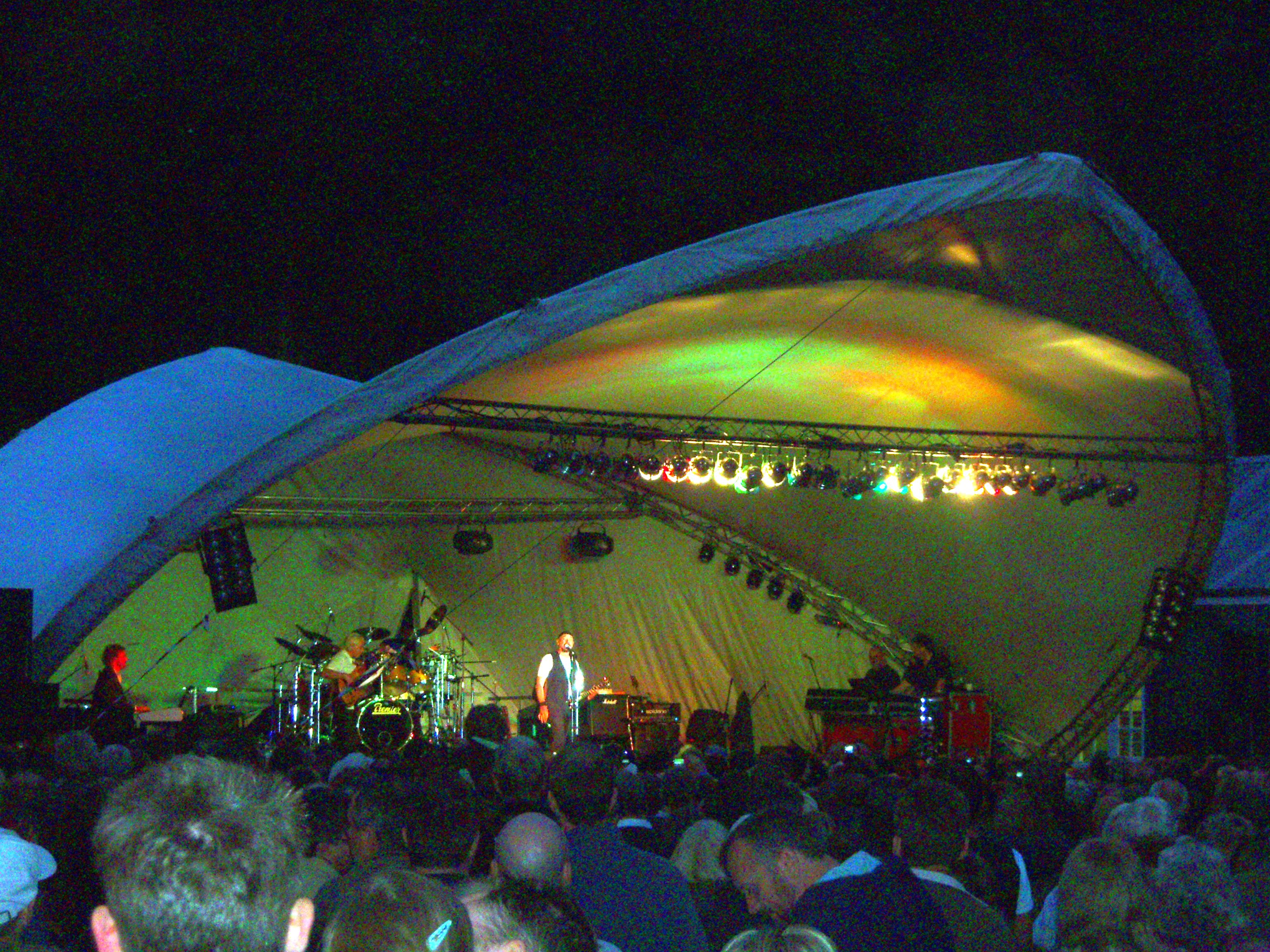
Jethro Tull on the Village Green Stage in 2009 (the then main stage)

In 2007, the event was moved to the Rural Life Centre, Tilford, and it reverted to being a three-day event in 2010.

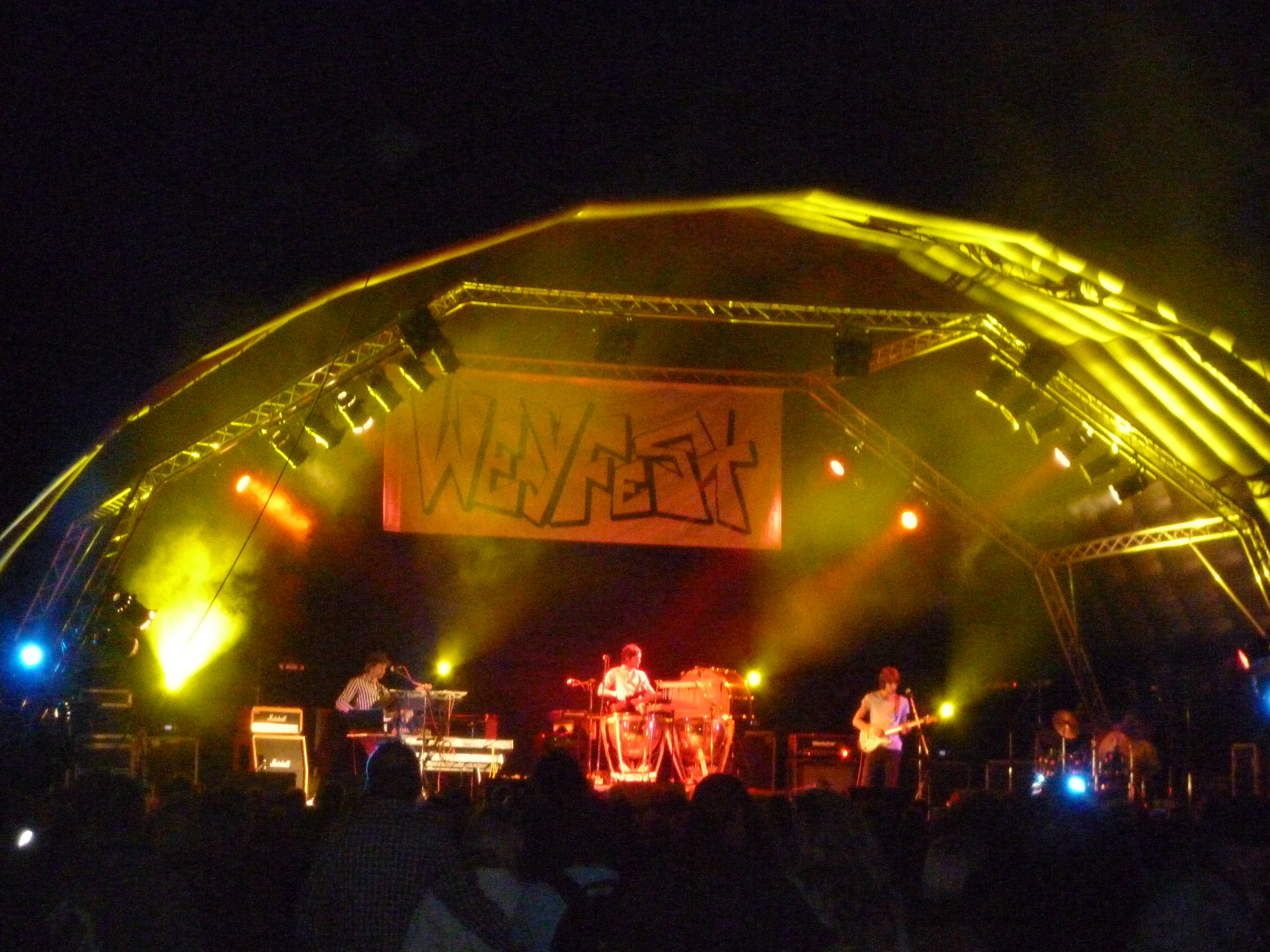
The Enid on Beekeepes Stage in 2011 (the new main stage)

2020 saw Weyfest go on hiatus until 2021 caused by COVID-19 pandemic.

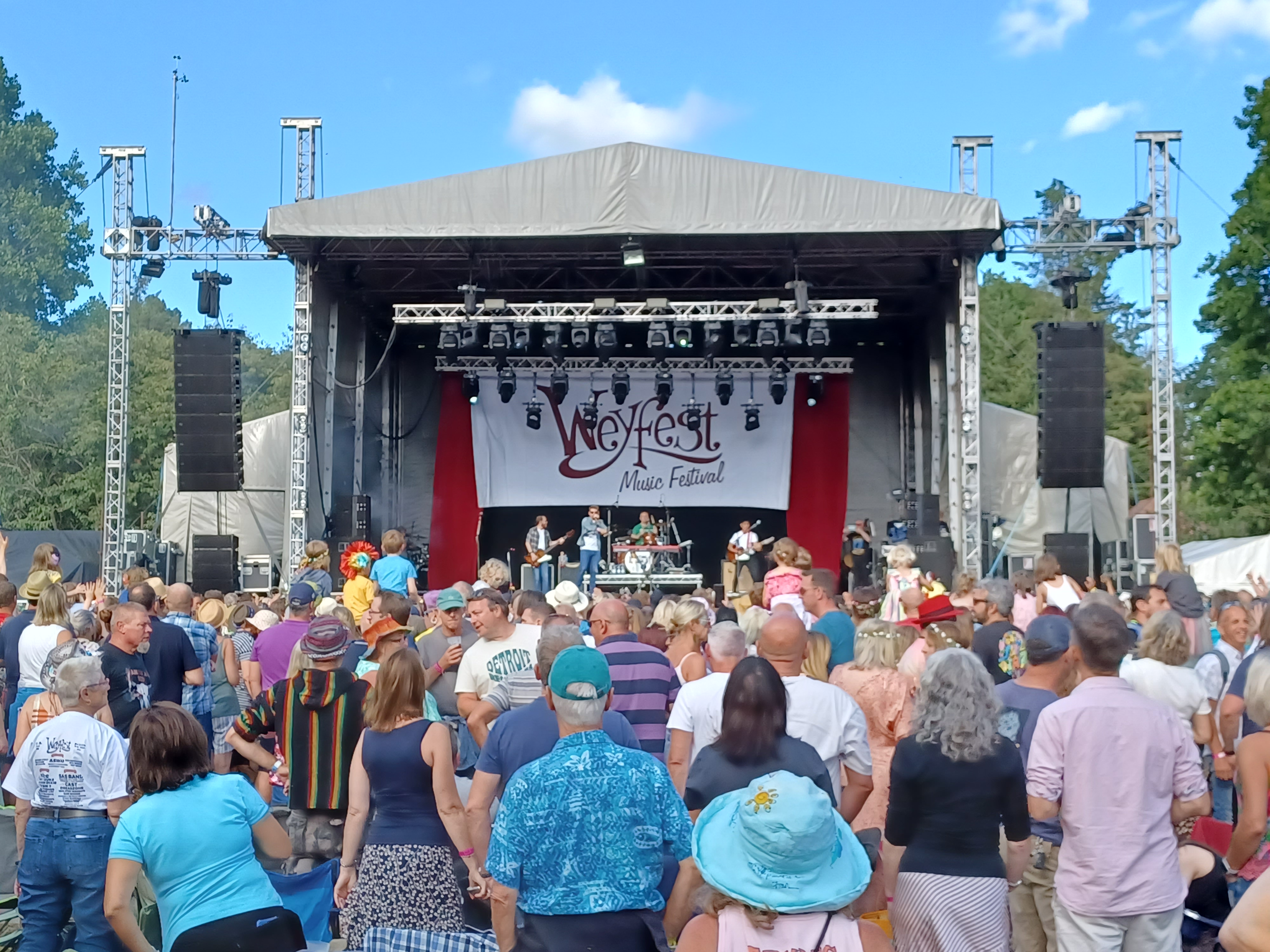
Scouting for Girls on Beekeepers Stage in 2022 (main stage)

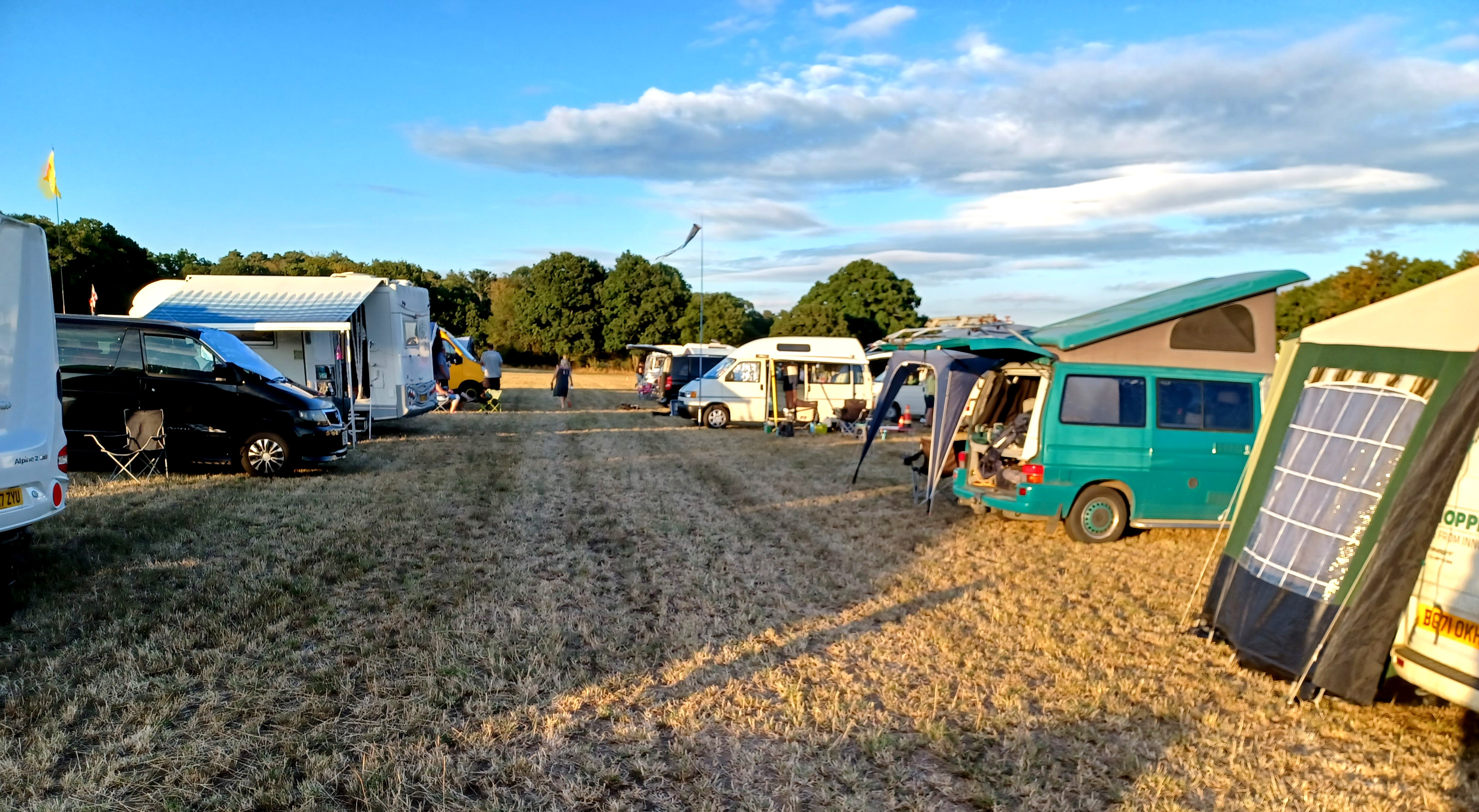
Camping at Weyfest 2022

== Headline acts ==
- 2005 Dr Feelgood, The Wildcards, Mike Sanchez Band, Freeway Jam, Jackie Lynton Band
- 2006 Dayglo Pirates, Jackie Lynton Band
- 2007 Osibisa, Steve Gibbons, The Nashville Teens, King Earl Boogie Band, Ric Sanders
- 2008 Steve Harley & Cockney Rebel, Rockpile, The Beat, John Otway, Chas & Dave, The Pirates
- 2009 Jethro Tull, The Beat, Mungo Jerry
- 2010 Seth Lakeman, The Stranglers, Nine Below Zero, The Zombies, Focus, John Otway, Chris Difford, The Christians, Ade Edmondson, Martin Turner's Wishbone Ash, Curved Air
- 2011 Focus, Newton Faulkner, The Enid. The Blockheads, The Christians, Robin Trower, Dr Feelgood, Crazy World of Arthur Brown, John Otway Big Band
- 2012 10cc, Asia, The Hoosiers, Go West, Steve Hackett, Snakecharmer, Martin Barre, Curved Air, Karnataka
- 2013 UB40, Echo and the Bunnymen, The Stranglers, Toploader, Roachford, From the Jam, The Temperance Movement, King King, Eddie and the Hot Rods, John Coghlan's Quo, The Strawbs, The Wurzels
- 2014 Squeeze, The Feeling, Big Country, The Undertones, Jethro Tull, The Orb, The Move, Chas & Dave, Ward Thomas
- 2015 The Waterboys, Level 42, Paul Carrack, Nazareth, The Quireboys, Hugh Cornwell, Andy Fairweather Low, Mungo Jerry, Ward Thomas, Roachford
- 2016 Boomtown Rats, The Darkness, Dreadzone, Big Country, From The Jam, The Beat, Bad Manners, Wishbone Ash, The Blow Monkeys, Jo Harman, John Otway, The Wurzels, Wildflowers, Broken Witt Rebels, Slim Chance
- 2017 Jools Holland, Alison Moyet, Buzzcocks, Stereo MC's, Ralph McTell, Atomic Rooster, Inglorious, Dub Pistols, Eddie and the Hot Rods, Hayseed Dixie, Mike Sanchez, Brother Strut, Broken Witt Rebels, Stevie Nimmo Trio
- 2018 10cc, SAS Band, Cast, Dreadzone, Judie Tzuke, Roger Taylor, Paul Young, Toyah, System 7, The Christians, Hayseed Dixie
- 2019 Lightning Seeds, Gabrielle, The Selecter, Scouting For Girls, The Brand New Heavies, Reef, Hailey Tuck, Tankus the Henge, The Farleys
- 2021 (the return) UB40, The Feeling, Soul II Soul, Scouting For Girls, Dreadzone, Nik Kershaw, Republica, The Dualers, Tankus the Henge
- 2022 10cc, Billy Ocean, Del Amitri, The Christians, Cast, The Dualers, Stereo MC's, Scouting For Girls, Inglorious, Leatherat, The Farleys
