= Thursley Common =

Nature reserve in Surrey, England

Coordinates: 51.1616°N 0.7082°W

Designations

Ramsar Wetland
- Official name: Thursley & Ockley Bog
- Designated: 14 February 1994
- Reference no.: 647

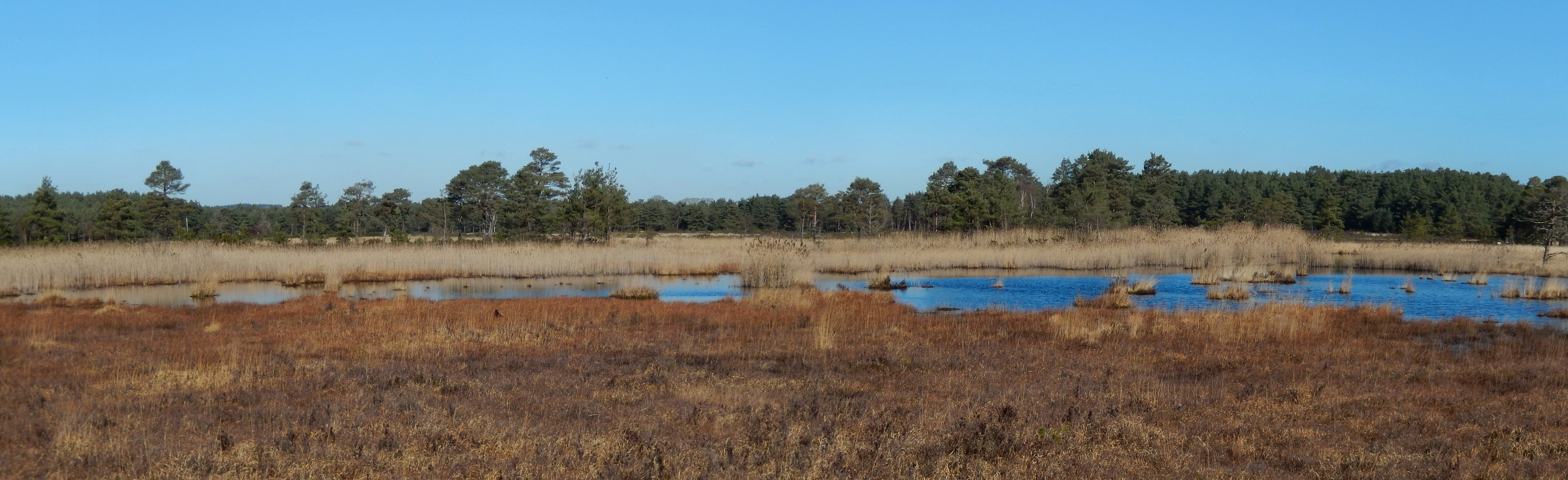
Thursley Common, the bog pools in wintertime

Thursley Common is a national nature reserve in Surrey, England, and has also been designated as a Ramsar wetland. It is also part of a Site of Special Scientific Interest called Thursley, Hankley and Frensham Commons.

== Geography ==
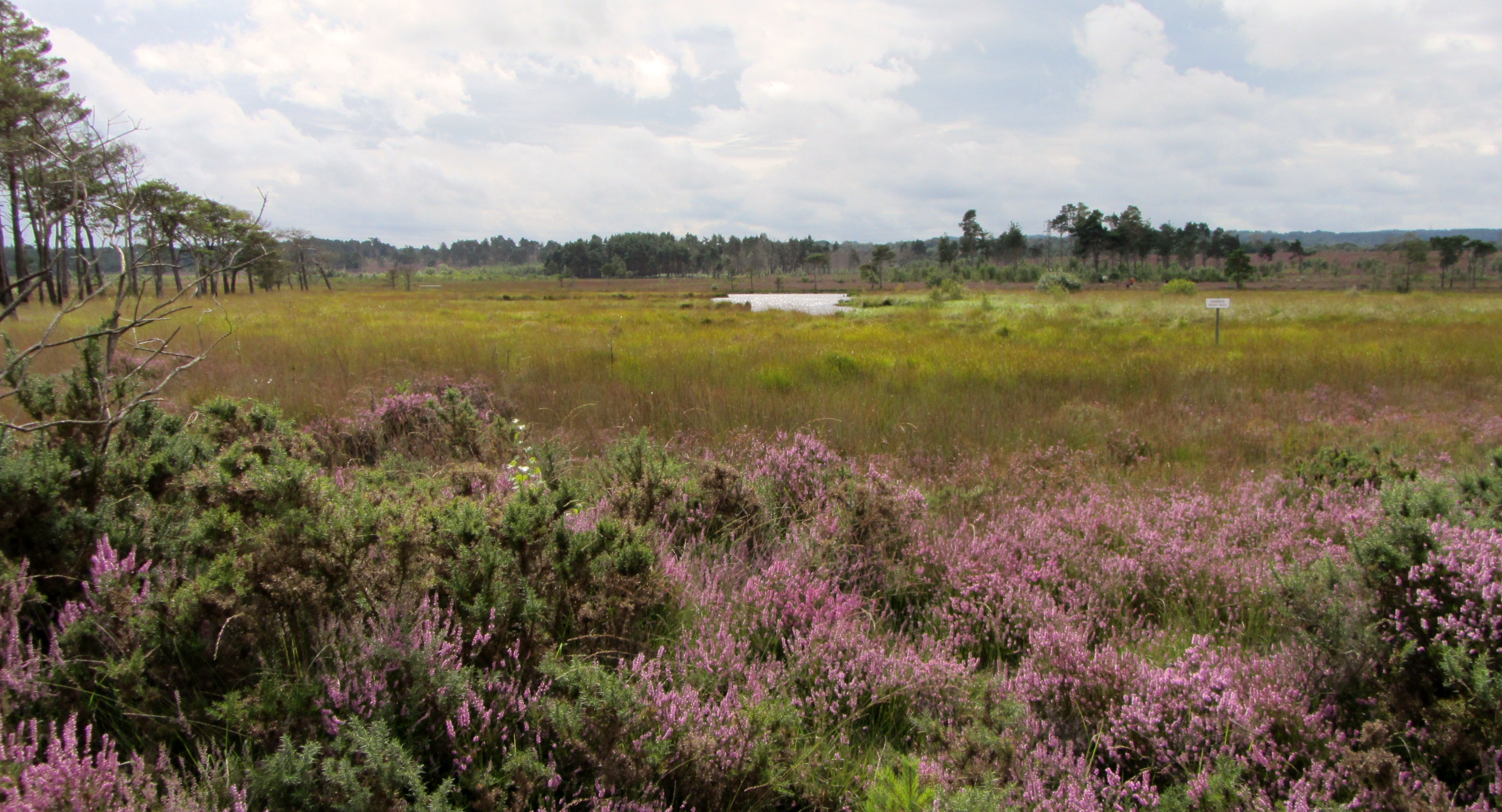
View across the bog to Pudmore Pond, with row of pine trees, heather and gorse in foreground

Thursley Common is an area of some 350 hectares of heathland in the southwest of Surrey, England. It is protected as a Site of Special Scientific Interest and as a National nature reserve. Lying between the villages of Thursley and Elstead, the common is generally 2–300 feet above sea-level. The site consists of extensive areas of open dry heathland, with peat bogs, ponds, boggy pools and ditches, and both pine and deciduous woodland. There are sandy tracks and paths, and a "Heath trail" leads from the carpark around a circuit, with boardwalks in boggy areas and with a number of information boards.

== History ==
In a heatwave in 2006, an out-of-control wildfire burned 60% of the common, but by 2010 the heath was regenerating, with heather and gorse spreading across the charred ground. Forty-five pairs of Dartford warblers were recorded before the event, and six pairs in 2010.

In 2020, another wildfire resulted in 150 hectares, about a third of the core reserve, being burnt. An estimated 200-300 animal and plant species have been affected.

A subsequent 'Preserve Our Reserve' campaign has raised over £30,000 for initial clearance works, to promote early regeneration of the flora and fauna, for preservation projects to restore the habitat and providing information and future fire prevention. The funds are being managed by Elstead and Thursley Parish Councils who will liaise with Natural England over the projects.

== Wildlife ==
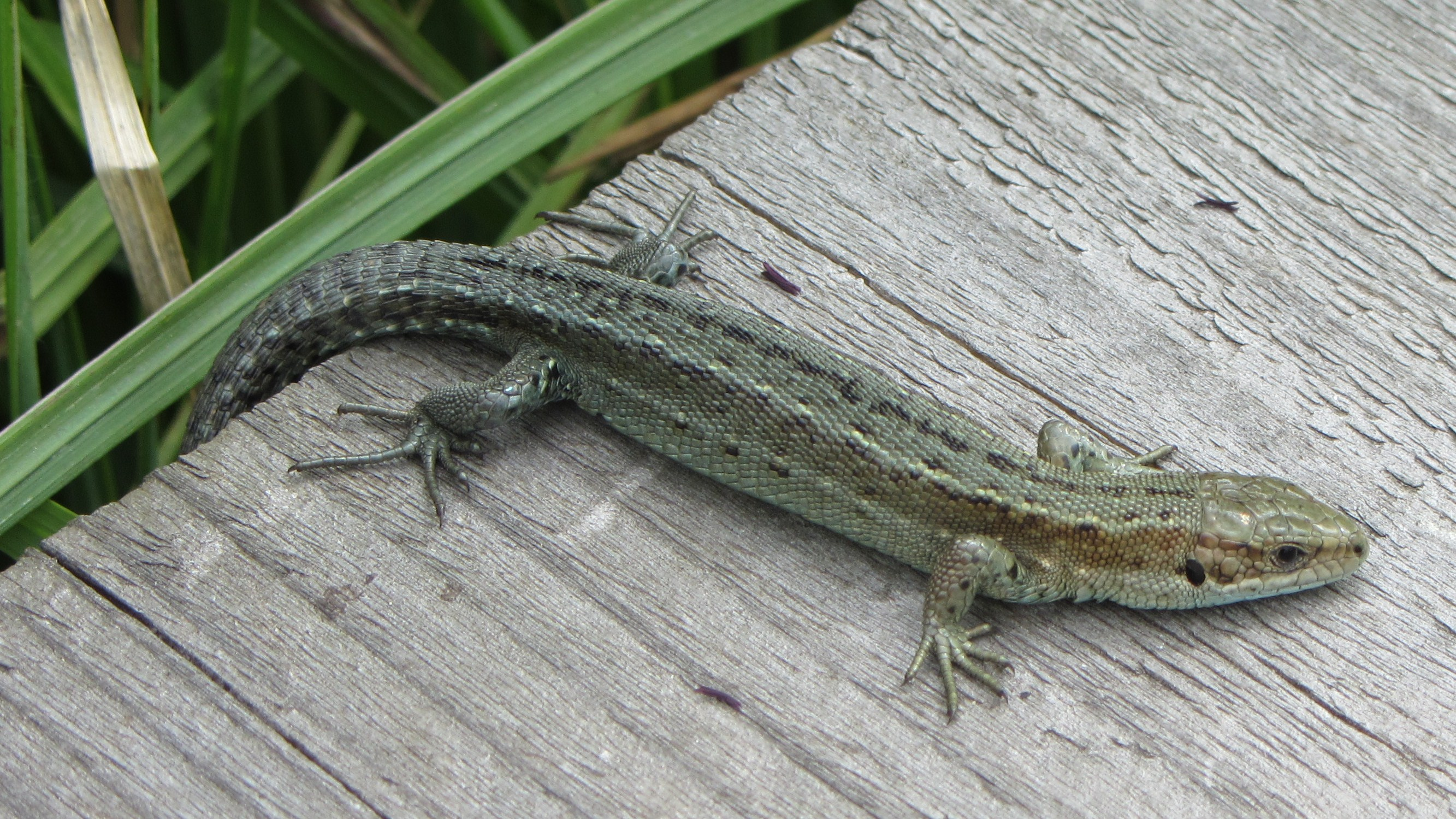
Common Lizard on one of the boardwalks

Thursley Common is one of the last remaining heathlands in Surrey. It is famed for its diverse wildlife. Whilst red crossbill, red kite, woodlark and European stonechat are regularly seen, birds such as Dartford warbler, whinchat, Northern wheatear, tree pipit and common redstart are frequently encountered. Rarer birds including osprey, black redstart and great grey shrike also visit the common. There are nationally important breeding populations of European nightjar and woodlark. The wetlands support several rare invertebrates, twenty species of dragonfly and damselfly have been recorded here, and there are six species of native reptile in the reserve.
