= Thursley, Hankley and Frensham Commons =

Protected area in Surrey, England

Coordinates: 51.160°N 0.726°W

- Site of Special Scientific Interest
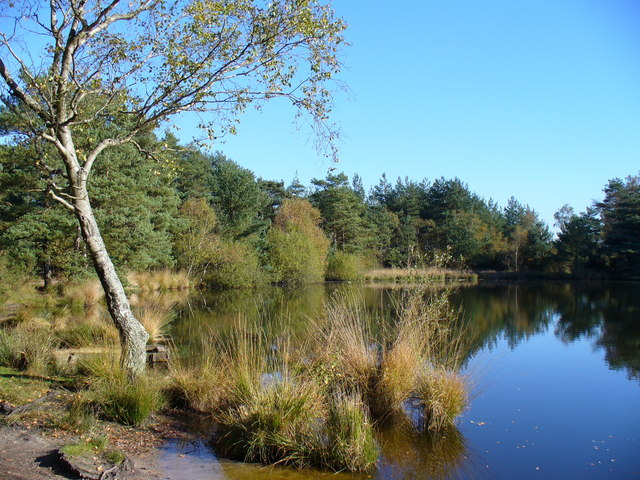
- Thursley Common
- Location of Thursley, Hankley and Frensham Commons.
- Area of search: Surrey
- Grid reference: SU 892 409
- Interest: Biological
- Area: 1,878.5 hectares (4,642 acres)
- Notification date: 1991
- Location map: Magic Map

Thursley, Hankley and Frensham Commons is a 1,878.5-hectare (4,642-acre) biological Site of Special Scientific Interest west of Godalming in Surrey. Thursley and Hankley Commons are Nature Conservation Review sites, Grade I. An area of 115.1 hectares (284 acres) is a local nature reserve called The Flashes and an area of 180 hectares (440 acres) is the Elstead Group of Commons, a nature reserve managed by the Surrey Wildlife Trust. Thursley Common is a national nature reserve. An area of 265.7 hectares (657 acres) is the Thursley & Ockley Bogs Ramsar site. The site is a Special Protection Area and part of the Thursley, Ash, Pirbright & Chobham Special Area of Conservation. Part of the land area designated as Thursley, Hankley and Frensham Commons SSSI is owned by the Ministry of Defence (Hankley Common).

This site is of national importance for its invertebrates, birds and reptiles, and is mainly heathland but the valley mire on Thursley Common is one of the best in the country. Orthoptera include the nationally rare large marsh grasshopper. The site is one of the richest in southern England for birds and of outstanding importance for reptiles, such as the nationally rare sand lizard.

== See also ==
- Frensham Common
