= Elstead Group of Commons =

Nature reserve in Surrey, England

Coordinates: 51.172°N 0.677°W

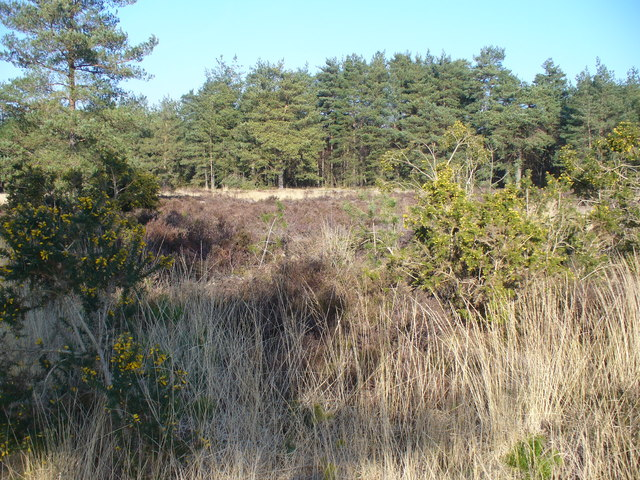
- Interactive map of Elstead Group of Commons
- Type: Nature reserve
- Location: , Surrey
- OS grid: SU926423
- Area: 180 hectares (440 acres)
- Manager: Surrey Wildlife Trust

Elstead Group of Commons is a 180-hectare (440-acre) nature reserve east of Elstead in Surrey. It is composed of Royal, Elstead and Ockley Commons, which are owned by the Ministry of Defence and managed by the Surrey Wildlife Trust, and Bagmoor Common, which is owned and managed by the Trust. The site is part of Thursley, Hankley and Frensham Commons Special Protection Area and Site of Special Scientific Interest.

This site has heath, woodland and dry acid grassland, with scrub controlled by a herd of Belted Galloway cattle. It is an important site for saproxylic (wood eating) invertebrates, such as stag beetles. There are several ponds with a population of approximately 1000 toads.

There is public access but the site is an active military training area for the UK.
