= Hankley Common =

Common near Elstead, Surrey, England

Coordinates: 51.164°N 0.734°W

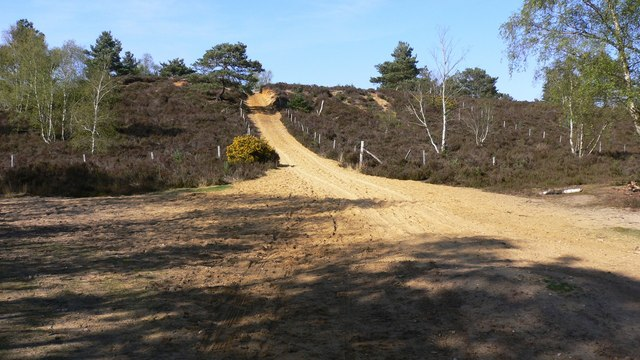
- Interactive map of Hankley Common
- Type: Nature reserve
- Location: Elstead, Surrey
- OS grid: SU886413
- Area: 560 hectares (1,400 acres)
- Manager: Surrey Wildlife Trust

Hankley Common is a 560-hectare (1,400-acre) nature reserve and filming location in the south-west of Elstead in Surrey. The site is part of the Thursley, Hankley and Frensham Commons Special Area of Conservation, Special Protection Area and Site of Special Scientific Interest. The site has woodland and lowland heath with heather and gorse. Birds include nightjars and Dartford warblers and there are other fauna such as adders and common lizards.

Access is subject to the needs of military training, with frequent training exercises and multiple buildings present.

== Atlantic Wall reconstruction ==
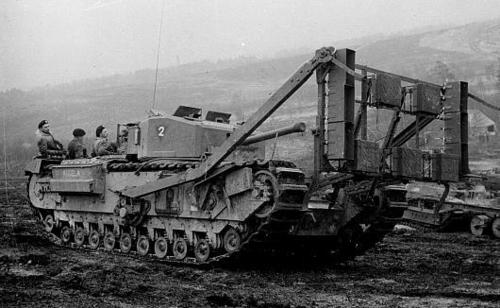
Churchill "Double Onion" tank in World War 2. The tank was driven against a wall, the framework was lowered to the ground against the wall. The tank then backed up a 100 feet laying out an electric detonating cable. The explosives were then detonated by the tank driver.

D-Day training sites were created in Britain in order to practise for Operation Overlord, the invasion of Northern France by allied forces in 1944. In 1943, in an area of the Common known as the Lion's Mouth, Canadian troops constructed a replica of a section of the Atlantic Wall. It is constructed from reinforced concrete and was used as a major training aid to develop and practise techniques to breach the defences of the French coast prior to the D-Day landings. The wall is about 100 m (330 ft) long, 3 m (9.8 ft) high by 3.5 m (11 ft) wide. It is divided into two sections between which there were originally steel gates. Nearby are other obstacles such as dragon's teeth, reinforced concrete blocks and lengths of railway track set in concrete and with wire entanglements.

Many of the relics show signs of live weapons training, and the main wall has two breaches caused by demolition devices including the Double Onion: a specialised demolition vehicle, one of Hobart's Funnies, based on the Churchill tank. The reinforced concrete was made with rebars varying from 10 to 20 mm (0.39 to 0.79 in) thick. Over the years the wall has become colonised by alkaline-loving lichens, mosses, ferns and other plants because the concrete provides the lime-based substrate that these species require and which is found nowhere else in the locality. They present an unusual range of plants to be found in an expanse of acid heathland. The preservation of the Wall is managed by Army Training Estates with the assistance of the MOD Hankley Conservation Group.

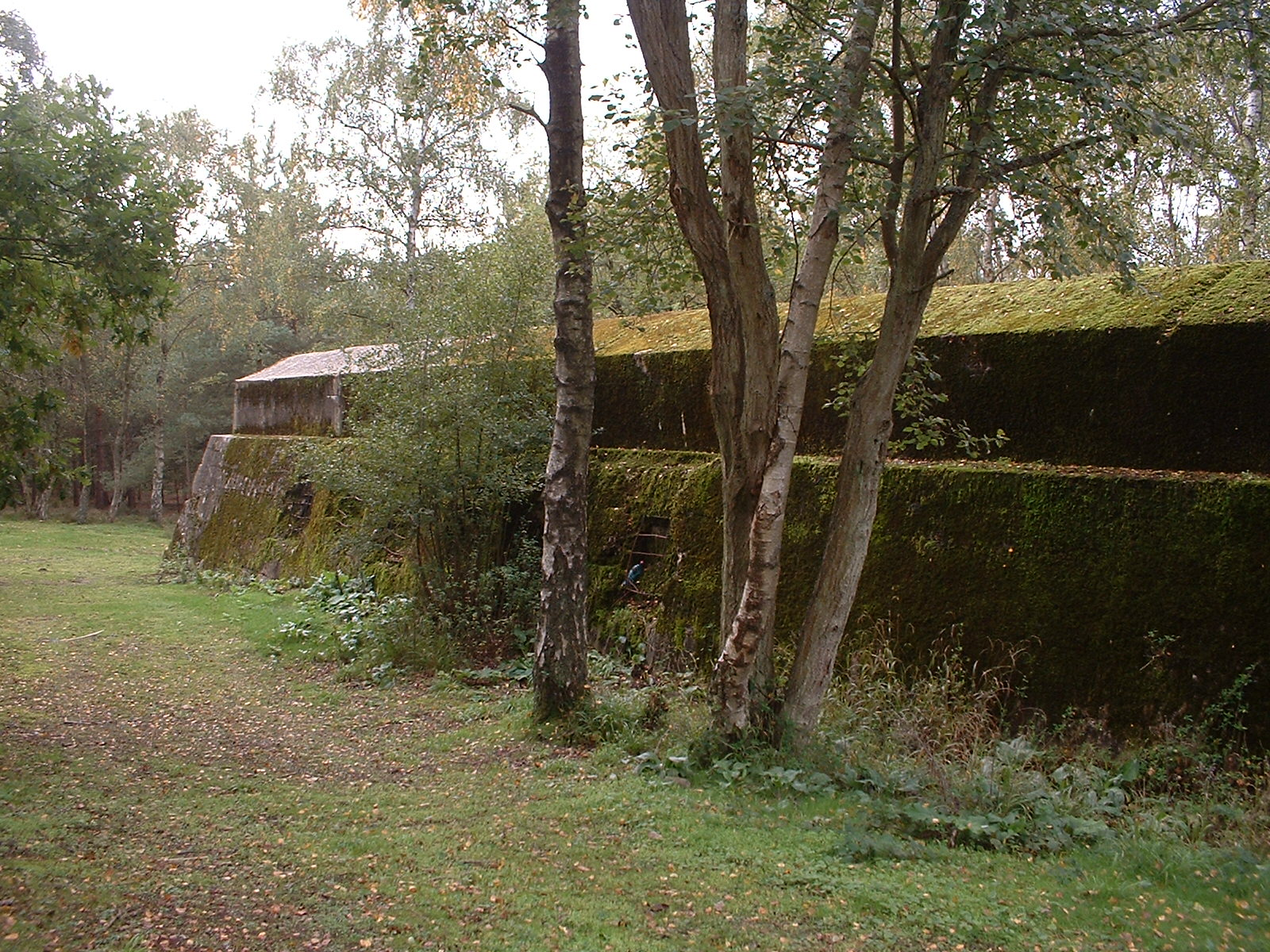

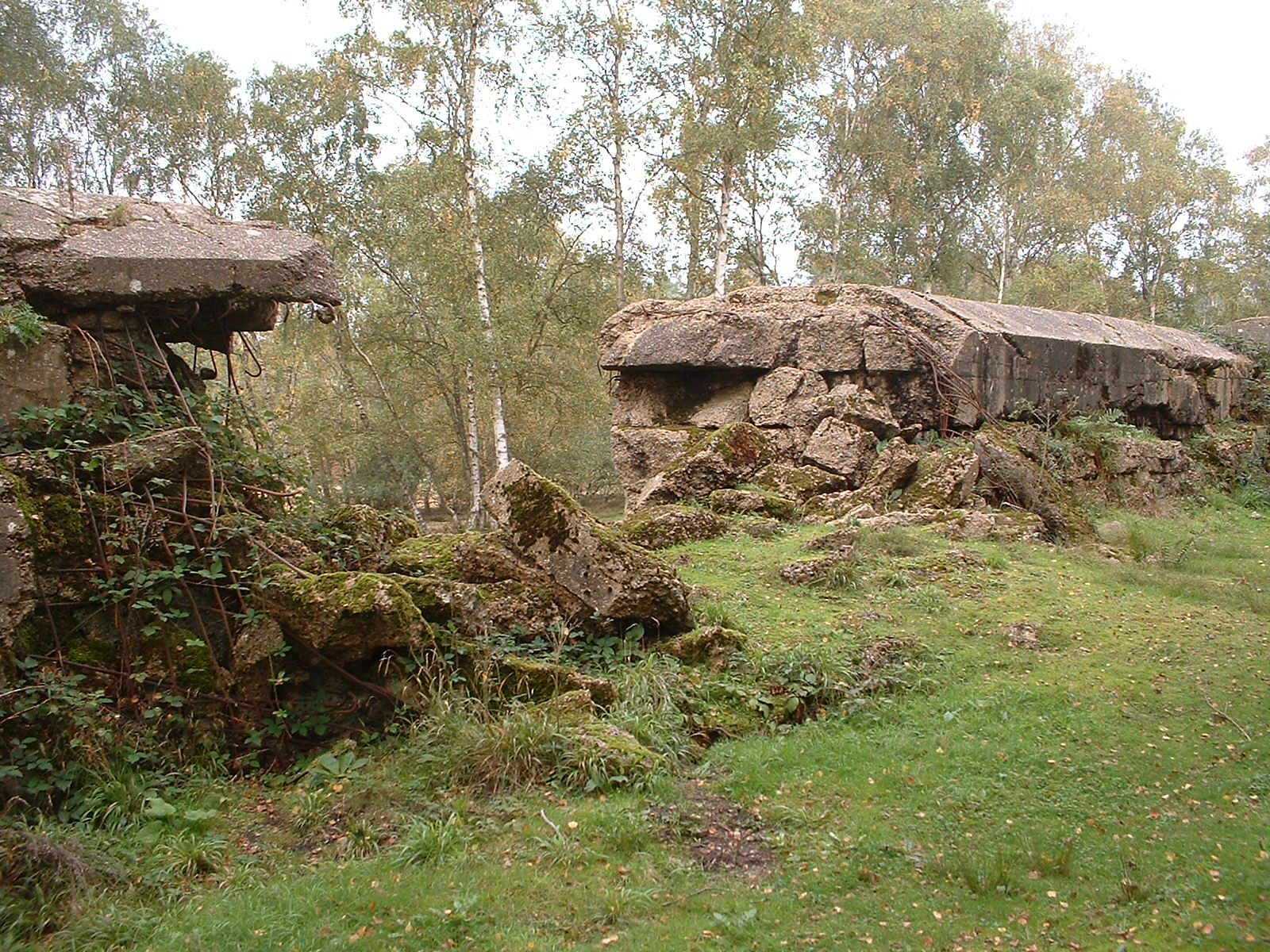

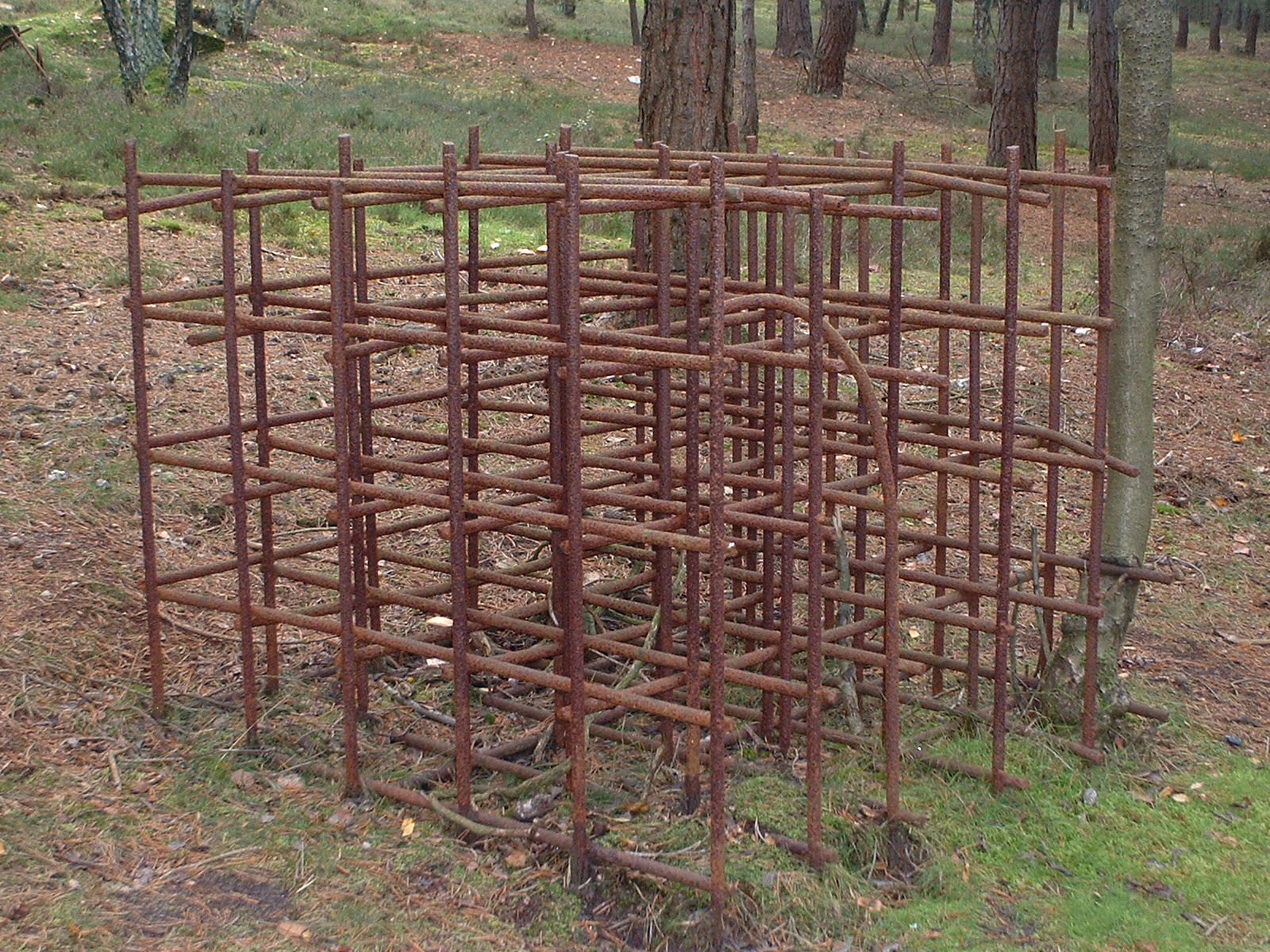

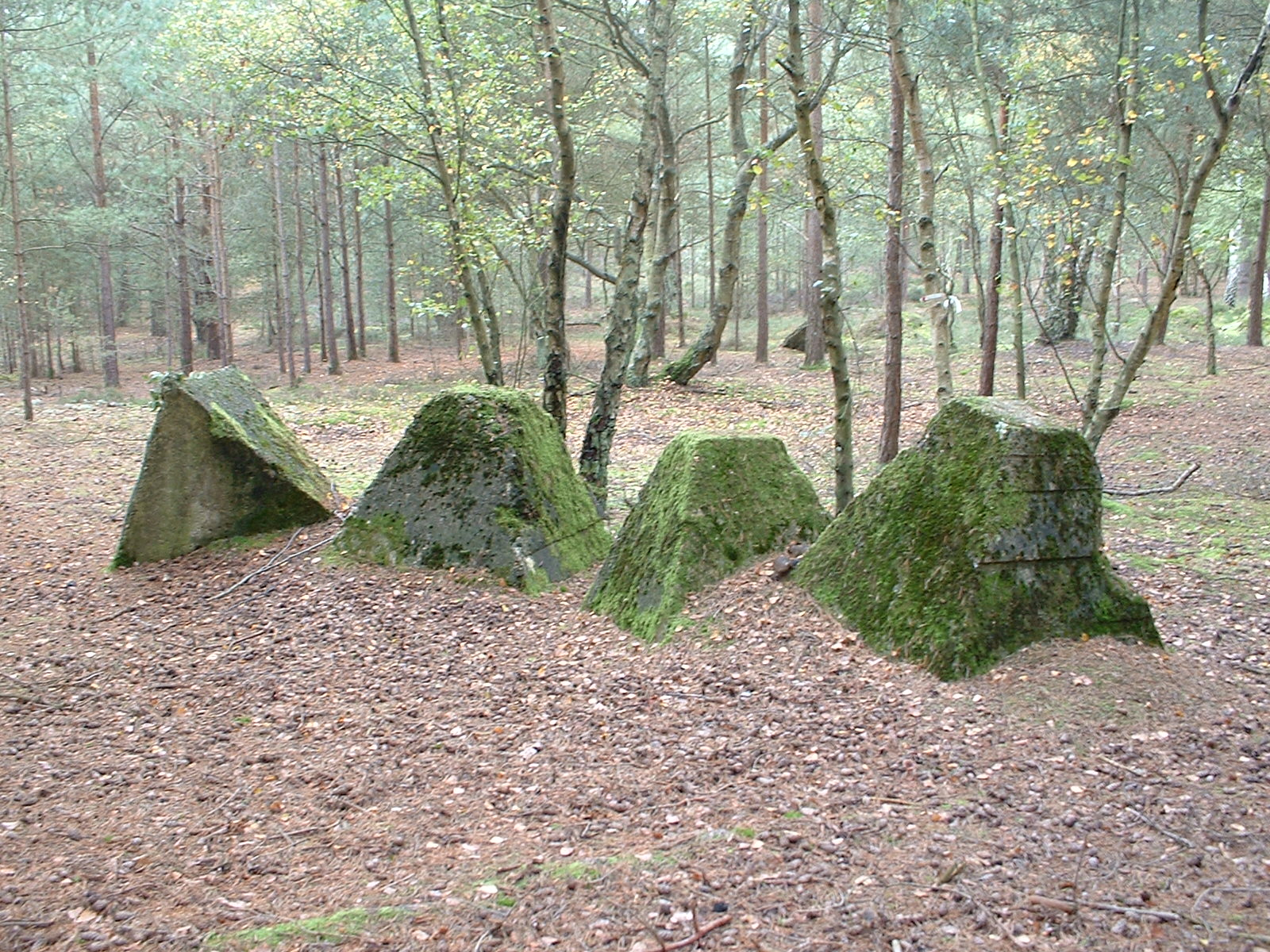

== Golf course ==
Hankley Common is home to Hankley Common Golf Club which opened in 1897 with nine holes and was expanded to eighteen holes in 1922.

== Film and television ==
Hankley Common has been used in Hollywood blockbuster movies and TV shows.

- It was used in the James Bond films The World Is Not Enough and Die Another Day. The sets depicted a pier in the Caspian Sea where James Bond was attacked by a helicopter saw, a chase scene through the Korean Demilitarized Zone on hovercraft. It was also used in Skyfall as the site of James Bond's ancestral Scottish mansion, and for the church scene with Judi Dench as M.
- The Common was used in 2014 for large numbers of scenes for the film Macbeth, starring Michael Fassbender and Marion Cotillard.
- Filming began on the Common in early-mid 2019 for Matthew Vaughan's The King's Man.
- In April 2019, filming began on the Common for the First World War epic 1917, in which it represented a French battlefield, with a large set constructed.
- In 2019, Marvel blockbuster Black Widow, starring Scarlett Johansson, Rachel Weisz, Florence Pugh and David Harbour, shot numerous scenes on the Common over a 3-month period from June to August. Among others, scenes depicted a multi-vehicle car chase, helicopter crash, bunker and destroyed buildings. Marvel needed to obtain planning permission to construct the wreckage of a helicopter.
- Hankley Common has been popular with fictional time travellers, having featured in Doctor Who and the Silurians and in Blackadder Back and Forth.
- In the fourth series of Ultimate Force, the Drop Zone huts and surrounding area were used to shoot a Colombian forces training camp.
- In 2021, Hankley Common doubled as the Wild West for the BBC true crime drama, Landscapers, starring Olivia Colman.
- Hankley Common was the location used to represent the landscape of Hell in the first season of The Sandman television series.
- Parts of Napoleon, involving large armies, were also filmed here in April 2022.
- Hankley Common features in Wicked and Wicked: For Good.

== Bossom air crash ==
In July 1932 a Puss Moth aircraft carrying Mrs. Emily Bossom, Bruce Bossom, the American wife and eldest son of politician Alfred Bossom, and Count Otto Erbach-Fürstenau, broke up in mid-air. At least two of the occupants fell to the ground on Hankley Common. The sites where they fell are marked with memorial stones.

== The Wigwam Murder ==
In September 1942, Hankley Common was the site of a murder. The victim was a woman who was living rough in a crude shelter made of tree branches in the manner of a wigwam, thus leading her to become known among locals as "the Wigwam Girl" and the murder case itself to be known as "the Wigwam Murder". She was eventually identified as 19-year-old Joan Pearl Wolfe.

== 2022 wildfires ==
In July 2022, during the 2022 United Kingdom heat wave, a series of wildfires took place in the common, each of which was described by the fire services as a "major incident". The smoke was strong enough to have been seen on the runway of Heathrow Airport as well as in Guildford. During the largest blaze of 24 July, Surrey Fire and Rescue urged nearby residents to keep windows closed and pets inside until the blaze was extinguished by the 19 vehicles in attendance. Several nearby residents were evacuated until the fire was brought under control. To protect the structures on the common and the valued training area, the MoD provided a contracted Eurocopter AS350 for aerial firefighting operations. Water for this was collected from nearby Frensham Great Pond, and this marked the first use of aerial firefighting equipment in Surrey. The fires combined burnt almost 70 hectares of the site and caused damage to protected habitats.
