= Frensham Common =

Common near Frensham, Surrey, England

Coordinates: 51°10′N 00°47′W

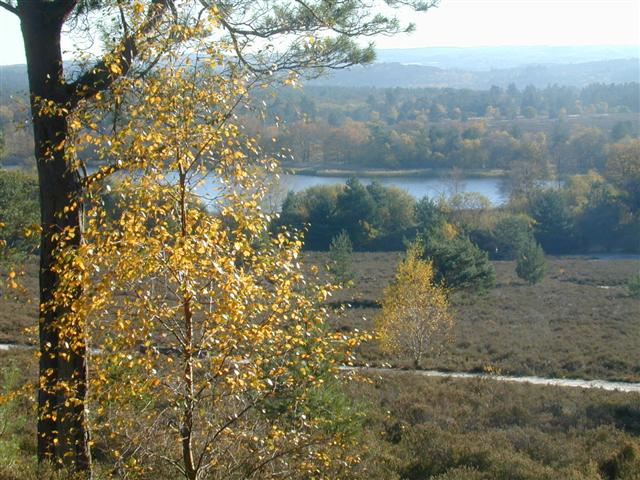
Hillsides of the common overlooking lower parts, including Frensham Little Pond

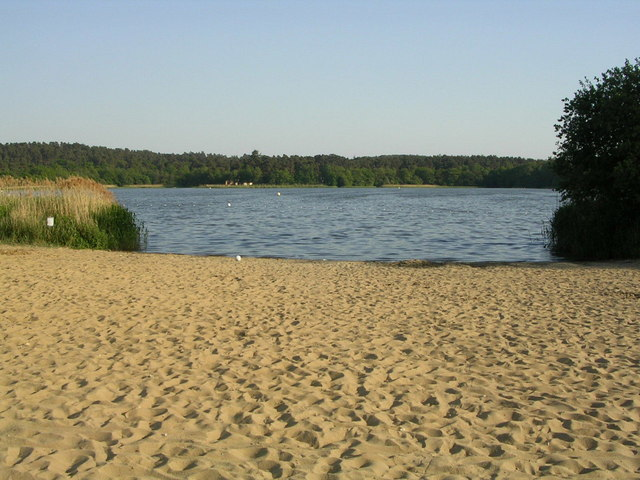
Great Pond with beach area

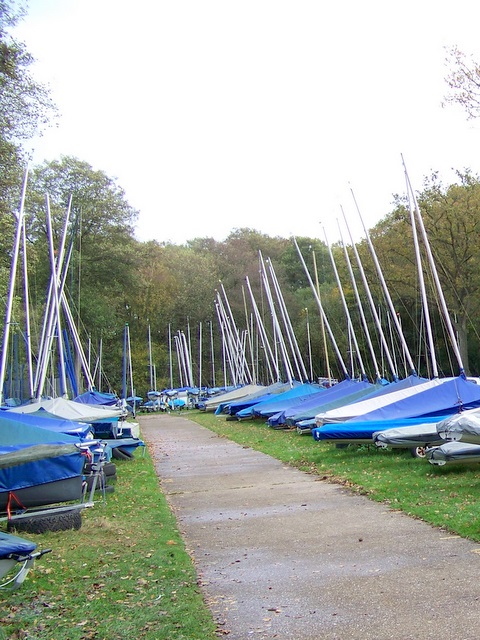
Dinghies for sailing on Frensham Great Pond (November 2009).

Frensham Common is a large Site of Special Scientific Interest (SSSI) heathland in Surrey. It is owned and operated by the National Trust and managed by Waverley Borough Council.

== Terrain, plants and animals ==
Frensham Common is an English SSSI heathland of 373 hectares (922 acres) which includes two large lakes. It lies almost wholly within Frensham, Surrey, a nucleated village on alluvial soil narrowly buffered to the north-west, connected by a path. The local road network surrounds the site; the nearest trunk roads are five miles (eight kilometres) away. The elevation is low but undulating with high points near the Kings Ridge - which bisects the common along a north/south axis - at approximately 90 m (300 ft) above sea level (ASL) and nearby, to the south-east, the three Devil's Jumps, the highest of which is 126 m (413 ft) ASL. The common supports few streams due to the permeability of the soil, although the ground to the south-east, called the Flashes, is boggy.

The site supports several protected species, including sand lizard, smooth snake, woodlark, Dartford warbler and nightjar.

The heathland is at risk of fire when conditions are dry. In 2010, 35 hectares (86 acres) of the common, in very dry conditions, burned. The most recent serious fire was in May 2023 when approximately 10 hectares (25 acres) burnt.

The lakes are prone to blooms of Blue-Green Algae in the summer months. Once detected by the Environment Agency, the National Trust warns visitors to avoid entering the pond water.

== Lakes ==
Until the construction of reservoirs and a gravel extraction-related lake in the north of Surrey in the early 20th century, Frensham Great Pond (grid reference SU845400) was the largest lake in the county. The Great Pond and Frensham Little Pond (SU860415) were built during the Middle Ages to provide fish for the Bishop of Winchester's estate. They were developed by Bishop Henry of Blois, also known as Henry of Winchester, who established Farnham Castle to the north and who owned this and nearby manors.

== Tourism ==
The area is popular with visitors, particularly in summer months. Swimming is supported at the Great Pond within marked areas. Both ponds have car parking, toilets, cafés and picnic areas. Parking at both ponds carry charges, but payment can only be made digitally.

During hot weather in 2018 large numbers of visitors flocked to Frensham Common, particularly Frensham Great Pond, causing an anti-social parking problem with cars parked on rural clearways, double yellow lines and also leaving behind large amounts of rubbish.

Frensham Great Pond supports a sailing club, with dinghies regularly visible on the water. A hotel adjoins the south side of the Great Lake by the yachting area. North west of the common border is the small village of Frensham, which adjoins two hamlets further across the River Wey.

Less than 5% of the Common is within spurs of the common in Churt to the south or Tilford to the north.

Four prehistoric bowl barrows are in a straight line in the centre-east of the common. Villagers termed these the King's Ridge Barrows.

== Wartime ==
During the Second World War, tanks based in the Headley area used Frensham Common for training, whilst Canadian soldiers used to gallop across the Common. At this time, Frensham Great and Little Ponds were drained as otherwise they would have provided markers for German bombers.

== Filming ==
The common, particularly Frensham Great Pond, is a popular filming location alongside local Bourne Woods and Hankley Common.

- Scenes in the 1959 film The Hound of the Baskervilles were shot on the common.
- Scenes in the films Carry On Jack (1963) and Carry On Columbus (1992) were filmed on Frensham Great Pond.
- Nautical scenes for the 1979 cinema film The Riddle of the Sands were recorded on the Frensham Ponds.
- In 1966 the common was used as a stand-in for the Battle of Culloden in the 4 part Doctor Who serial The Highlanders.
- The lakes were used as a film location for the 1999 film The Mummy, posing as the river Nile.
- Snow White and The Huntsman was filmed at Frensham Little Pond.
- Scenes from The Witcher as well as The Witcher Blood Origin were also filmed here.
