= The Flashes =

Local nature reserve in Surrey, England

Coordinates: 51.1500°N 0.7675°W

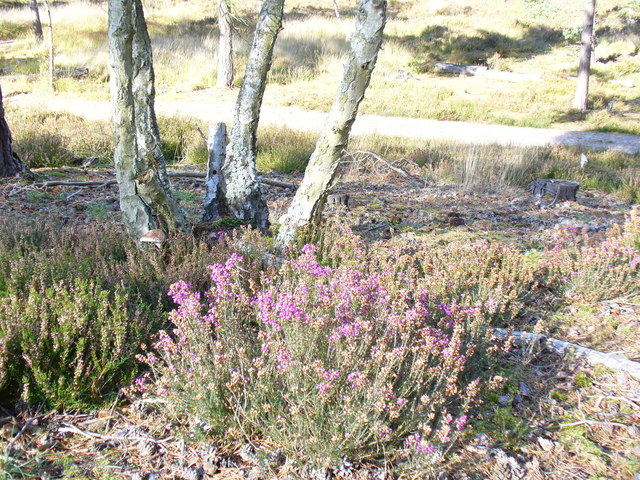
- Interactive map of The Flashes
- Type: Local Nature Reserve
- Location: Godalming, Surrey
- OS grid: SU 863 397
- Area: 115.1 hectares (284 acres)
- Manager: Waverley Borough Council

The Flashes is a 115.1-hectare (284-acre) Local Nature Reserve west of Godalming in Surrey. It is owned by the National Trust and managed by Waverley Borough Council. It is part of Thursley, Hankley and Frensham Commons Sites of Special Scientific Interest, Thursley, Ash, Pirbright & Chobham Special Area of Conservation and Thursley, Hankley & Frensham Commons Special Protection Area,

Most of The Flashes is a river valley mire with purple moor-grass, cross-leaved heath, common cottongrass, heather, rushes and sphagnum mosses. Part of the site is covered with peat.

There is access from Sandy Lane.

A forest fire which broke out on The Flashes on 5 May 1995 burned 3 square miles (7.8 km^{2}) of land and trees over the course of six hours and destroyed a Surrey Fire Brigade fire engine worth £140,000 (equivalent to £288,000 in 2025). Twelve fire engines and over 80 firefighters from Surrey and two neighbouring counties, as well as a group of nearby campers, helped bring the fire under control by eleven o'clock in the evening.
