= Tankus =

British band

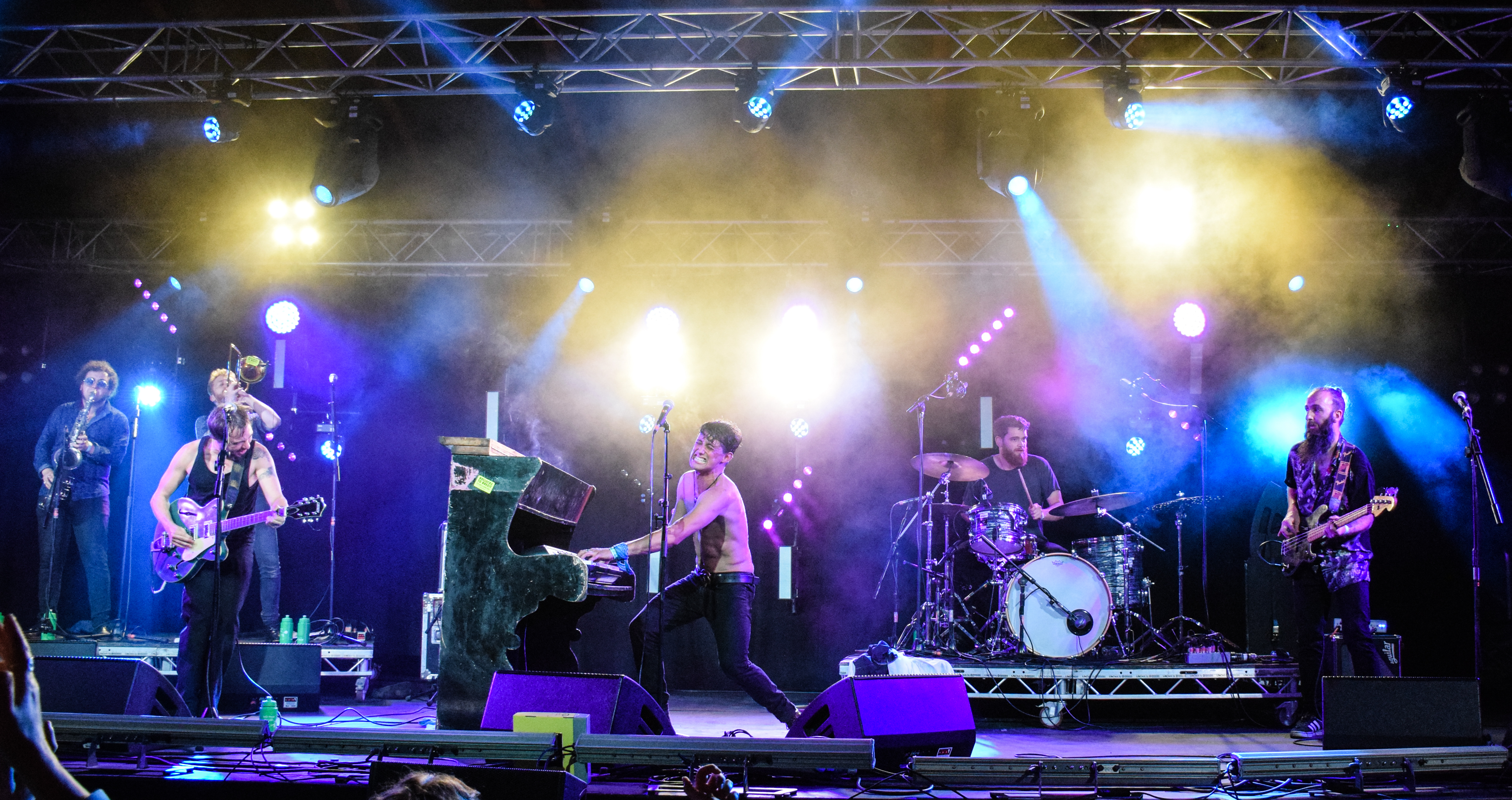
- Tankus at Towersey Festival 2018

Background information
- Origin: London, England
- Genres: Rock n Roll,
- Years active: 2006–present
- Label: 5DB Records
- Members: Jaz Delorean; Jamie Shaw; Jack Price; Joao Mello; Dan Hipkin; Russell Evans
- Website: www.tankusband.com

Tankus is a British band based in London. Initially based around the songwriting of Jaz Delorean after forming as Tankus the Henge at the BRIT School, the band has developed a style of music which they term "gonzo rock 'n' roll", with influences from New Orleans jazz, psychedelic rock, 1970s funk and songwriters such as Tom Waits and The Band. They are lyrically and aesthetically inspired by 20th century American literature such as the works of Allen Ginsberg, Jack Kerouac, Charles Bukowski and Hunter S. Thompson, which they combine with influences from Jaz Delorean's experience working on funfairs and in the circus around the UK (1950s and 1960s rock 'n' roll, brightly painted artwork, carnival lights).

The band was a PRS for Music featured artist in 2010, and in 2011 was named by Metro as one of their "Top 10 Acts To See" at Glastonbury Festival. In 2012, the group appeared on an album commemorating the 2012 London Olympics. Since then, they have played frequently during the European festival season, playing at Montreux Jazz Festival, Glastonbury, Isle of Wight, Fusion Festival, WOMAD and hundreds of others. Tankus have a reputation for both the frequency and intensity of their live performances, and are on tour across Europe for half the year. They were one of the first British bands to tour in the EU since Brexit, and during the COVID-19 pandemic. Post-Covid, the band have appeared at Rencontres Trans Musicales, Glastonbury, Boomtown, whilst relentlessly touring the UK & Europe.

The band released their third album, titled Luna Park!, on 4 December 2020.

Their fourth record, Valley of Distraction was released on 5DB Records in late 2025.

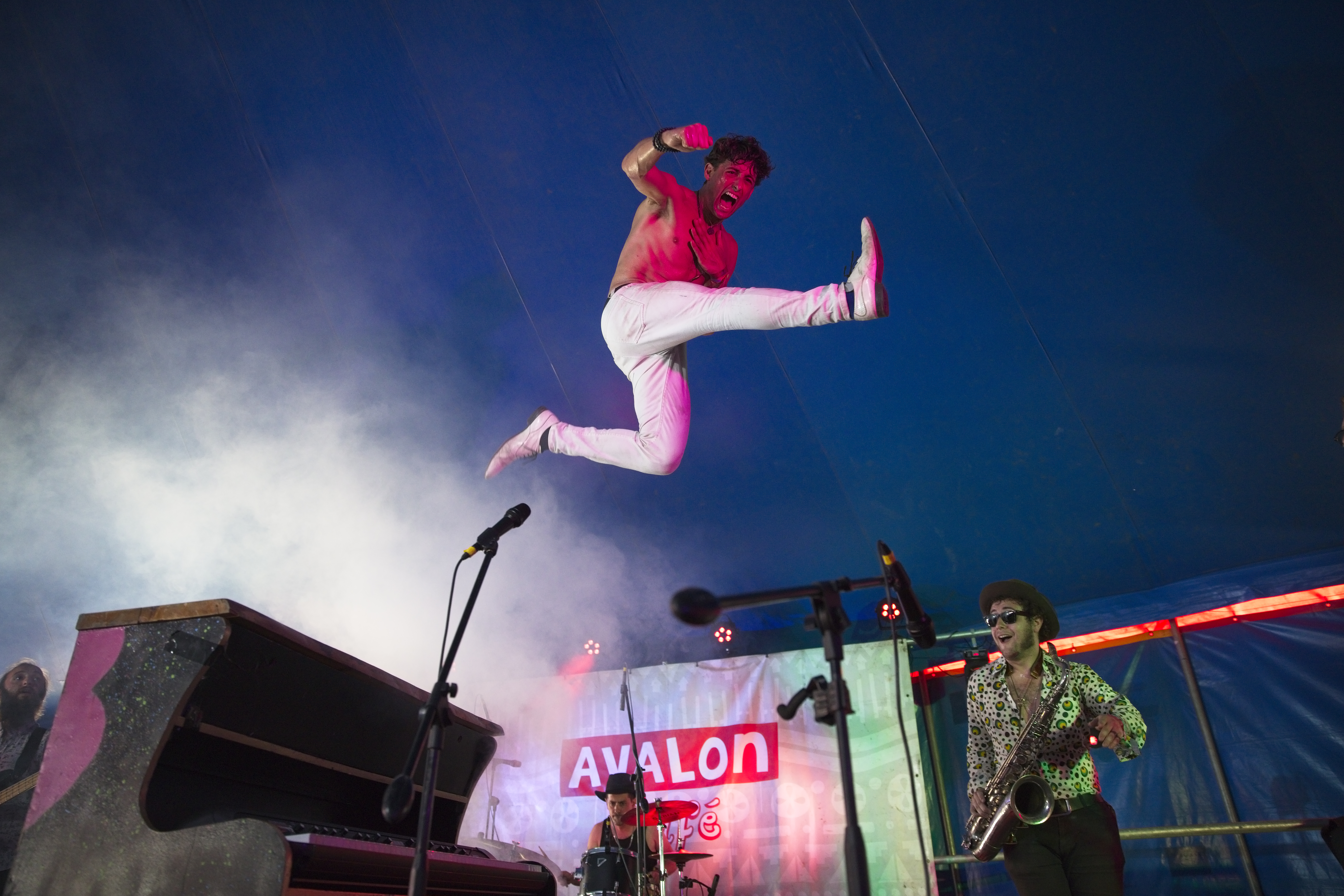
Performing at Glastonbury 2017

== Releases ==
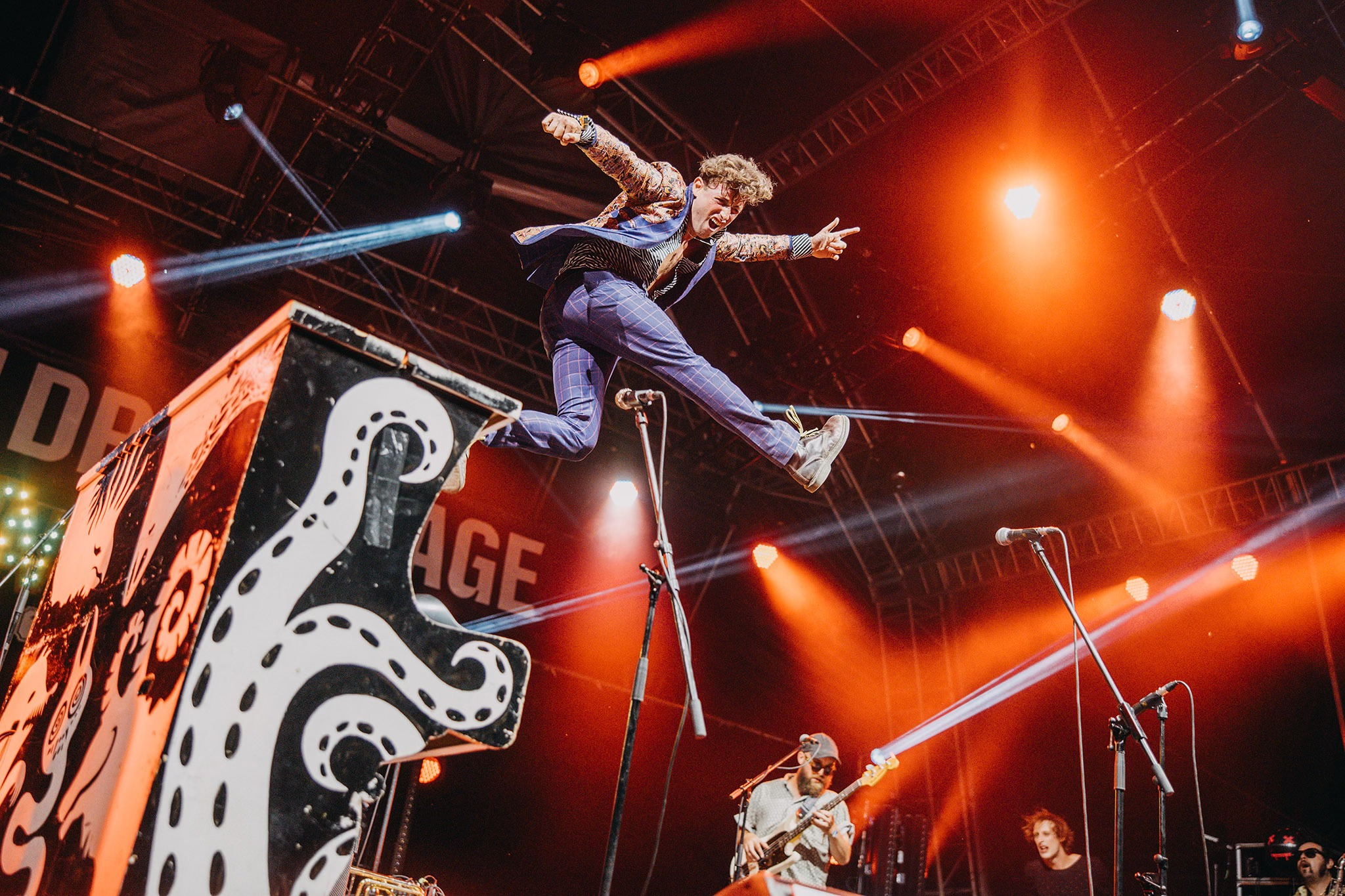

Title	Format	Year	Label
Tankus the Henge	Album	2013	Self Released
Smiling Makes The Day Go Quicker	EP	2013	Self Released
Weather EP	EP	2015	Self Released
You Can Do Anything EP	EP	2017	Self Released
I Crave Affection Baby, But Not When I Drive	Album	2018	Self Released
Luna Park!	Album	2020	Self Released
Valley Of Distraction	Album	2025	5DB Records
