= Tilford =

Village and parish in Surrey, England

Coordinates: 51.183°N 0.748°W

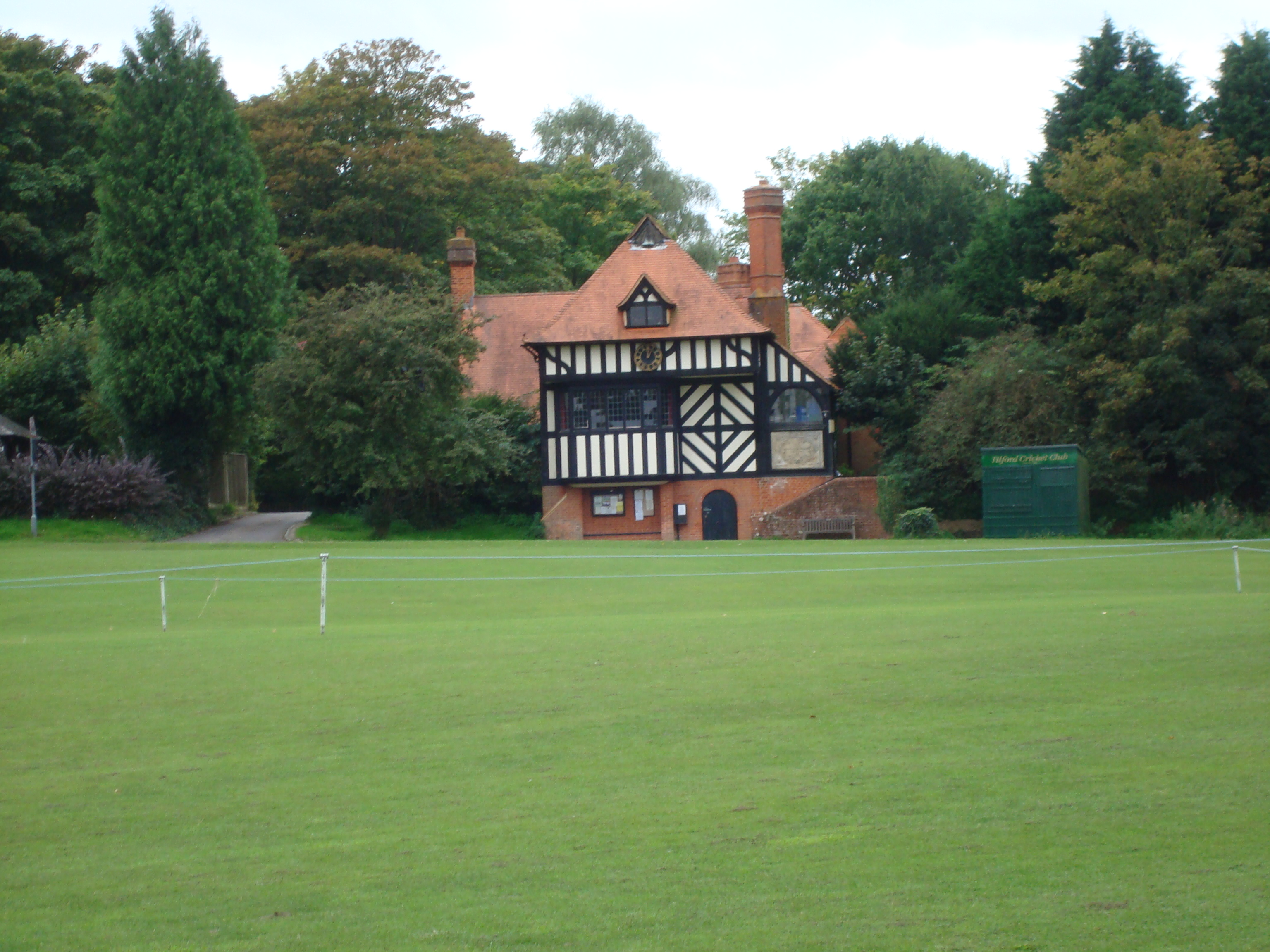
- Tilford Green and Lutyens' Tilford Institute

- Location within Surrey
- Area: 9.87 km^{2} (3.81 sq mi)
- Population: 799 (Civil Parish 2011)
  - Density: 81/km^{2} (210/sq mi)
- OS grid reference: SU875434
- Civil parish: Tilford
- District: Waverley
- Shire county: Surrey
- Region: South East
- Country: England
- Sovereign state: United Kingdom
- Post town: Farnham
- Postcode district: GU10
- Dialling code: 01252
- Police: Surrey
- Fire: Surrey
- Ambulance: South East Coast
- UK Parliament: Farnham and Bordon

Tilford is a village and civil parish centred at the point where the two branches of the River Wey merge in Surrey, England, 3 miles (4.8 km) south-east of Farnham. It has half of Charleshill, Elstead in its east, a steep northern outcrop of the Greensand Ridge at Crooksbury Hill on Crooksbury Common in the north and Farnham Common (woodland) Nature Reserve in the west, which has the Rural Life Living Museum. As the Greensand Ridge in its western section is in two parts, the Greensand Way has a connecting spur here to its main route running east–west to the south.

== History ==
The name "Tilford" appears to identify the Old English name Tila, as Tila's ford" or "Tilla's ford". Several substantial farm houses date from the 16th century. Tilford House was built in 1727 and its chapel in 1776. In the mid eighteenth century the village was owned by Elizabeth Abney, daughter of Lady Mary Abney; and her detailed local survey map has survived to this day in the British Library. During the second world war, Cdr D J L 'Tim' Foster (RN Rtd), who later lived in the village, brought back from northern Russia a reindeer (named Minsk) in his submarine HMS Tigris.

== Geography ==
The land reaches 163m OD on the boundary with Seale, with a marked 180° south-facing panorama on OS maps and other guides, taking in much of Alice Holt Forest and the Greensand Ridge. This has contributed to the inclusion wholesale of Tilford into the Surrey Hills Area of Outstanding Natural Beauty The centre of the parish on the River Wey is at 49-50m OD.

== Religious institutions ==
- All Saints Church was built in 1867 in medieval style. It is grade II listed. The Tilford Bach Festival is based at the church.
- Islamabad, a piece of land that was bought and used for the Annual Conventions of the Ahmadiyya Community from 1985 up until 2004, when the conventions moved to Hadeeqatul Mahdi near Alton, Hampshire. In 2015 it was announced that the existing pre-fab huts on the land were intended to be replaced with a new mosque built with minarets generating energy, and wind-turbines. The site is currently the international headquarters of the community and the primary residence of Mirza Masroor Ahmad, leader of the Ahmadiyya Community.

== Amenities ==
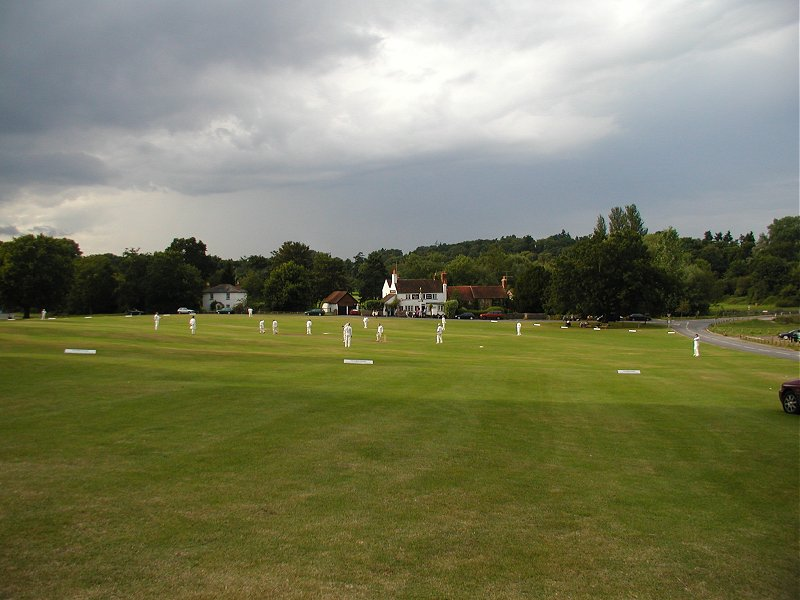
Cricket on Tilford Green

All Saints Church of England Infant School occupies an attractive site overlooking the green. Waverley Abbey Church of England school is in the village. The name is derived from Waverley Abbey. Tilford, hosts a team in the sport of cricket, which in 2014 won a local village league. The Tilford Bach Festival founded by Denys Darlow has been held in the village since 1952.

== Demography and housing ==
2011 Census Homes
Output area	Detached	Semi-detached	Terraced	Flats and apartments	Caravans/temporary/mobile homes	shared between households
(Civil Parish)	184	53	15	26	5	0

The average level of accommodation in the region composed of detached houses was 28%, the average that was apartments was 22.6%.

2011 Census Key Statistics
Output area	Population	Households	% Owned outright	% Owned with a loan	hectares
(Civil Parish)	799	283	36.4%	36.7%	987

The proportion of households in the civil parish who owned their home outright compares to the regional average of 35.1%. The proportion who owned their home with a loan compares to the regional average of 32.5%. The remaining percentage is made up of rented dwellings (plus a negligible percentage of households living rent-free).

== Landmarks ==
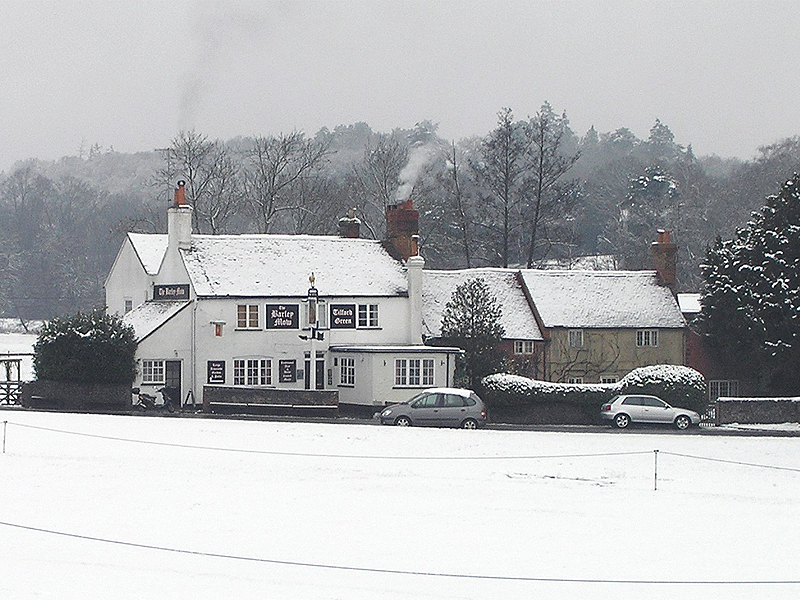
Tilford Green and the Barley Mow pub, 2007

The village centres on a triangular green used for cricket in the summer.

- The two branches of River Wey, Wey North and Wey South have their confluence in the village centre.
- The Barley Mow pub was built in about 1763.
- The Tilford Institute was built in 1894 to Sir Edwin Lutyens' design and is a focus for sport.
- South Bank Cottage (formerly Gorse Cottage) was home for 8 years from 1885 to Henry Shakspear Stephens Salt the writer and campaigner for social reform in the fields of prisons, schools, economic institutions, and the treatment of animals. It was Salt who first introduced Mahatma Gandhi to the influential works of Henry David Thoreau.
- The Rural Life Living Museum is a collection of prehistoric, Roman and medieval artefacts and reconstructed rural buildings. The annual Weyfest music festival takes place here.
- Crooksbury House, now divided, was built in Queen Anne style in 1890, enlarged in 1898-9 and mostly changed to Arts and Crafts movement 'vernacular' architecture in 1914 as Sir Edwin Lutyens's first Country House, for W. A. Chapman. Its garden with a pergola is by Gertrude Jekyll, planted and landscaped in 1892 and 1902.
- Mubarak Mosque was inaugurated on 17 May 2019 and serves as the headquarters of the worldwide Ahmadiyya Muslim Community.

=== Tilford Oak ===
Beside the green is a well-known tree, the Tilford Oak. In the early 21st century the tree was estimated to be at least 800 years old. In 1908 Eric Parker wrote about the Tilford Oak in Highways and Byways in Surrey:

William Cobbett made a curious mistake about the Tilford Oak. He and his son were riding through Tilford to Farnham on an autumn day in 1822:—

"We veered a little to the left after we came to Tilford, at which place on the Green we stopped to look at an oak tree, which, when I was a little boy, was but a very little tree, comparatively, and which is now, take it altogether, by far the finest tree that I ever saw in my life. The stem or shaft is short; that is to say, it is short before you come to the first limbs; but it is full thirty feet round, at about eight or ten feet from the ground. Out of the stem there come not less than fifteen or sixteen limbs, many of which are from five to ten feet round, and each of which would, in fact, be considered a decent stick of timber. I am not judge enough of timber to say anything about the quantity in the whole tree, but my son stepped the ground, and, as nearly as we could judge, the diameter of the extent of the branches was upwards of ninety feet, which would make a circumference of about three hundred feet. The tree is in full growth at this moment. There is a little hole in one of the limbs; but with that exception, there appears not the smallest sign of decay."

Visitors to Tilford can amuse themselves with trying over Cobbett's measurements. I could not reach to measure it ten feet from the ground; but at five feet I made its girth, in July 1907, twenty-four feet nine inches. Probably it was not much less when Cobbett was a little boy. That independent, combative mind would not accept another's measurements, and if he remembered the tree as a little tree, then a little tree he was right in remembering. Since his day the signs of decay have set in; the oak is still superb, but a Jubilee sapling has been planted as a neighbour. Centuries hence the sapling, perhaps, will be the King's Oak again.

Parker measured the girth again in 1934 and found it to be 1 foot more. The tree's branches have been lopped in recent years and the trunk is patched with iron sheets.

There are three other "British Oaks" nearby, planted at each corner of the triangular green, to commemorate:

- 60 years of Queen Victoria's reign (1897)
- the coronation of King Edward VII (1902)
- the accession of King George V (1910) – this oak was uprooted in the Great Storm of 1987 and has been replaced.

=== Tilford bridges ===
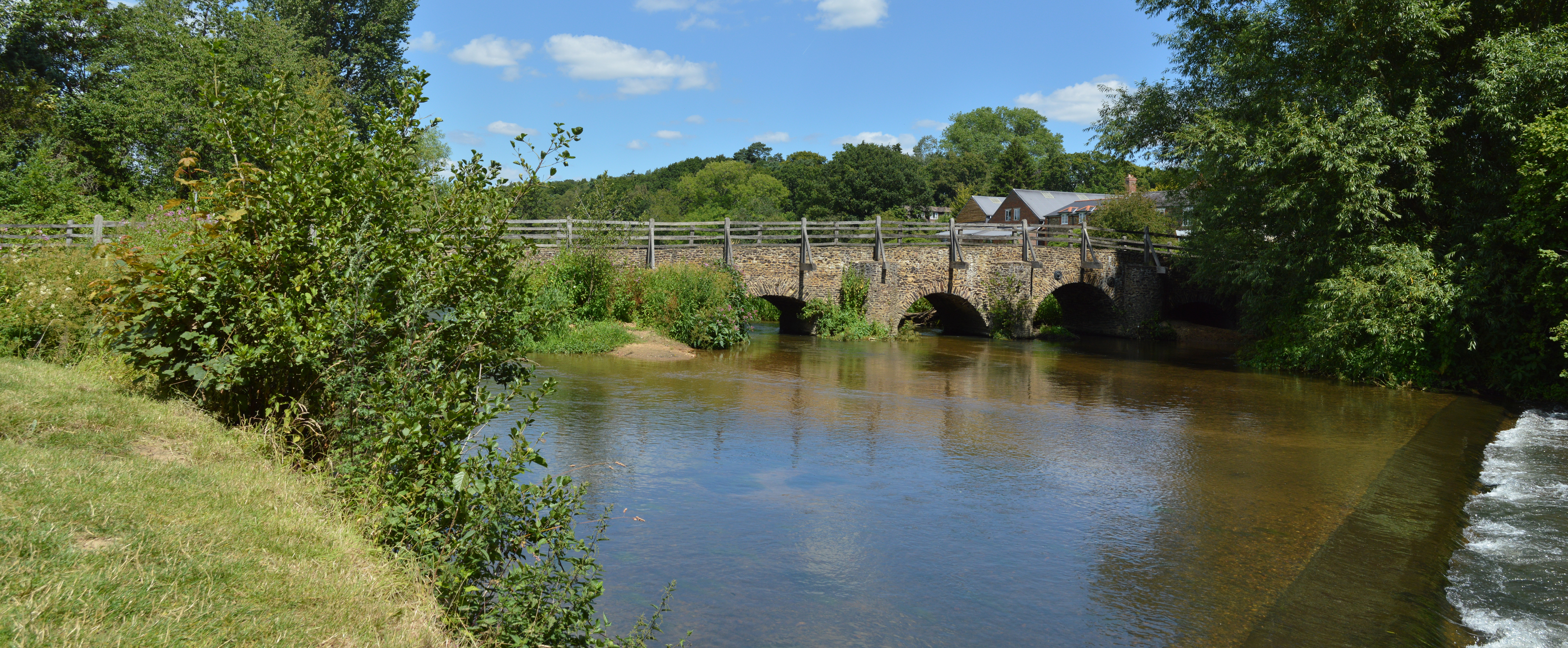
One of the medieval bridges at Tilford

The south branch and the combined branches of the River Wey are spanned by bridges at the village green. Dating from the medieval period, they were likely built by the monks of Waverley Abbey. Both are Grade I listed buildings, and scheduled monuments.

== Nearby places ==
- Farnham Heath, a nature reserve owned by the Royal Society for the Protection of Birds (RSPB). A growing population of field crickets has been reported on and around the reserve by the RSPB.
- Moor Park, Farnham
- Mother Ludlam's Cave, Moor Park, Farnham
- River Wey
- Elstead
- Waverley Abbey
