= Rural Life Living Museum, Tilford =

Open air museum of rural life near Farnham in Surrey, UK

Rural Life Living Museum
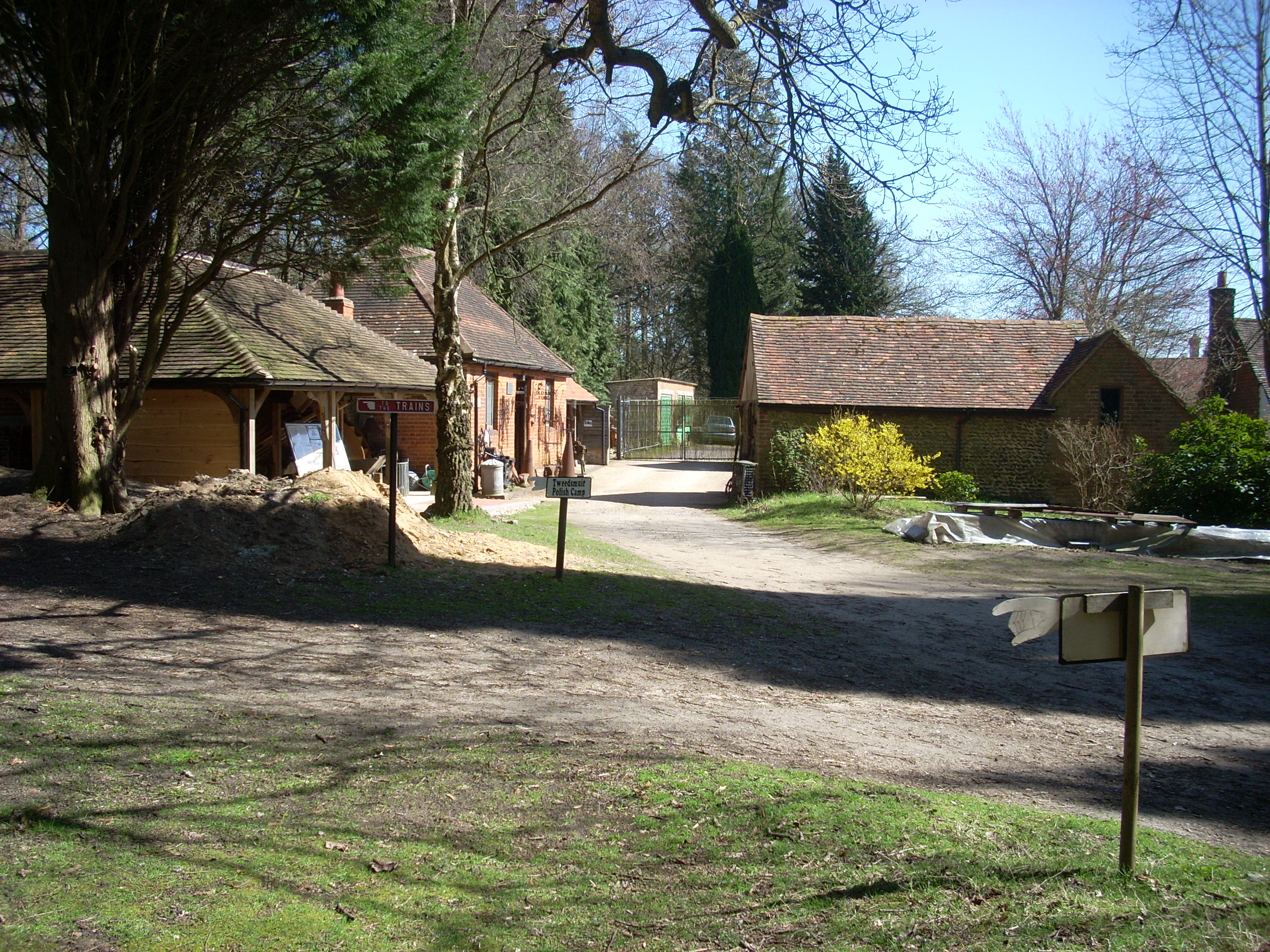
- Henry's Yard at the Rural Life Living Museum

- Location within Surrey
- Established: 1973
- Location: Tilford, Surrey, England
- Coordinates: 51.183°N 0.772°W
- Type: Open-air museum
- Website: http://www.rural-life.org.uk/

The Rural Life Living Museum is in Tilford, Surrey near Farnham in southern England. Formerly known as the Old Kiln Agricultural Museum and the Rural Life Centre, it is an open-air museum of country life run by the Old Kiln Museum Trust, a charitable trust. It covers over 10 acres (40,000 m^{2}) of field, woodland and barns, and collects and preserves objects associated with farming and goods used by local craftsmen between 1750 and 1960. There is also an arboretum with over one hundred species of trees.

The museum displays farming through the seasons, local hop growing, tools and crafts allied to country industries and needs. The social history of village life from the 19th century is displayed covering school life, domestic work, period shops and trades. There is a working iron furnace and a woodyard, both run by the volunteers. It also hosts the 2 ft (610 mm) narrow gauge Old Kiln Light Railway and a Blacksmith's forge.

The museum was originally assembled as a private collection by Henry and Madge Jackson, starting from 1948 when they moved into the adjacent Old Kiln Cottage. The Old Kiln Agricultural Museum itself first opened in 1973, originally occupying Henry's Yard, a small part of the current site. In 1984 the museum trust was created to secure the museum's future, and the museum was renamed as the Rural Life Centre. Madge and Henry both died in the early years of the 21st century. In 2019 the museum obtained further funding and was again renamed, this time to the Rural Life Living Museum.
