= Elstead =

Village and parish in Surrey, England

Coordinates: 51.184°N 0.698°W

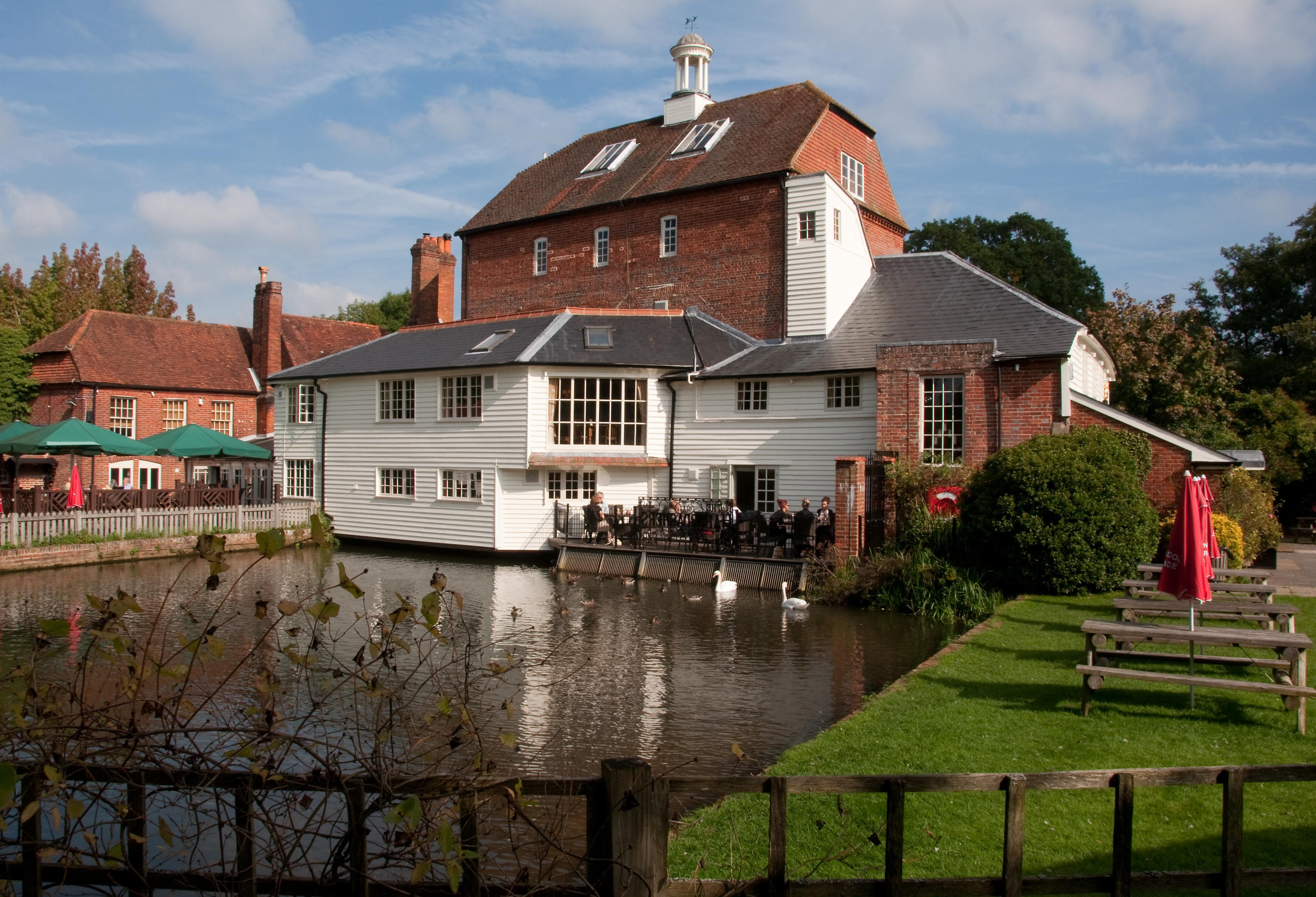
- Elstead Mill

- Location within Surrey
- Area: 11.04 km^{2} (4.26 sq mi)
- Population: 2,557 (Civil Parish 2011)
  - Density: 232/km^{2} (600/sq mi)
- OS grid reference: SU907437
- Civil parish: Elstead
- District: Waverley
- Shire county: Surrey
- Region: South East
- Country: England
- Sovereign state: United Kingdom
- Post town: Godalming
- Postcode district: GU8
- Dialling code: 01252
- Police: Surrey
- Fire: Surrey
- Ambulance: South East Coast
- UK Parliament: Godalming and Ash

Elstead is a civil parish in Surrey, England with shops, houses and cottages spanning the north and south sides of the River Wey; development is concentrated on two roads that meet at a central green. It includes Pot Common its southern neighbourhood. Hamlets in the parish, marginally separated from the village centre, are Charleshill and Elstead Common, both rich in woodland. Elstead lies between Farnham and Godalming on the B3001 road about 2.2 miles (3.6 km) west of the A3 Milford interchange.

== History ==
Elstead's relative prosperity over the centuries can be partly attributed to the existence of the availability of a site for a watermill and a bridge over the river; parts of the bridge are dated to around 1300.

The first known reference to Elstead is in the 1128 foundation charter for Waverley Abbey (sometimes spelt Waverly), where it was called Helestede. The church of St James was built around ten years later. It still contains 13th-century windows and some 14th-century timbers and is a Grade II* listed building.

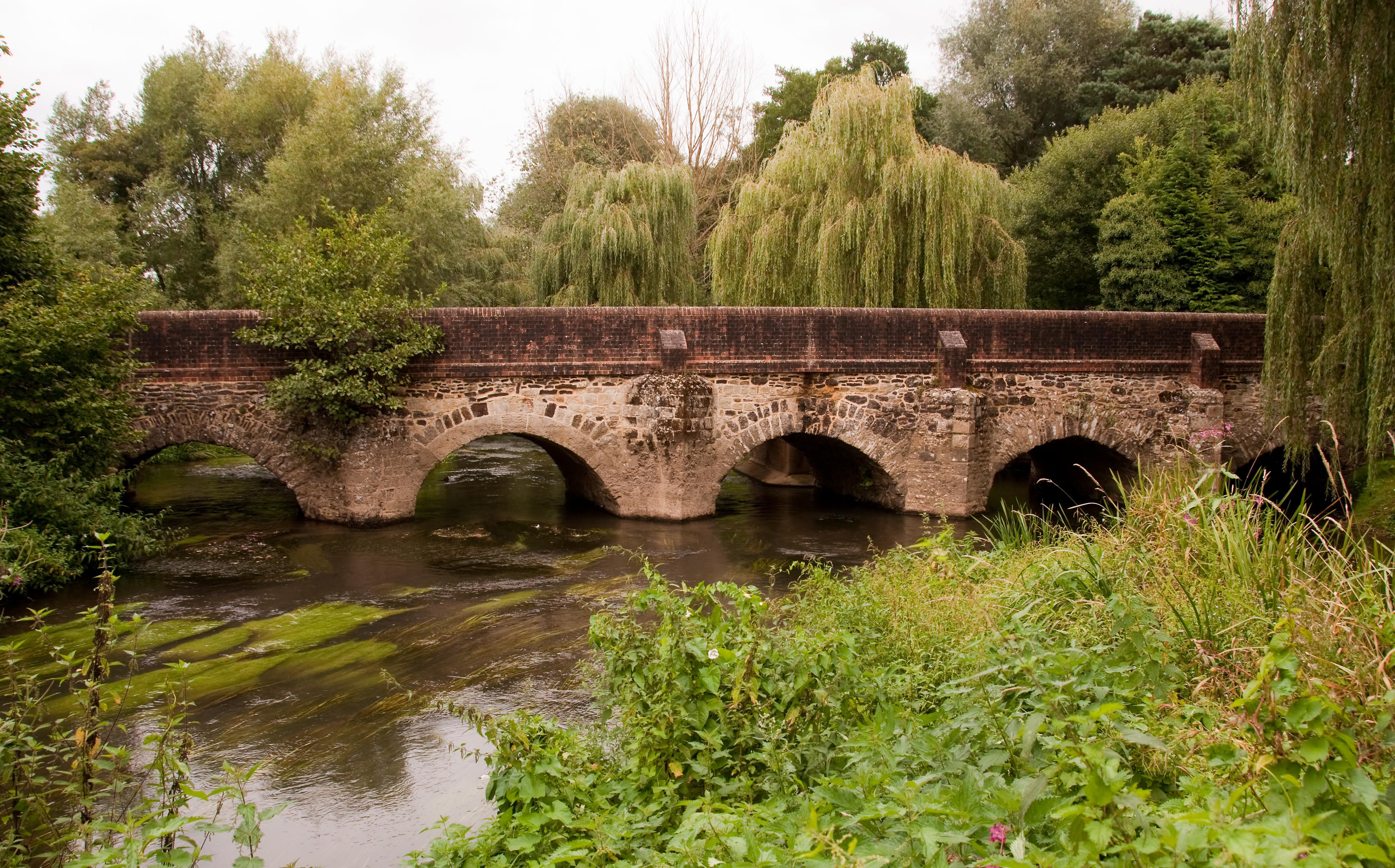
Elstead Old Bridge, built circa 1300

In the 14th century, the Scheduled ancient monument bridge was built over the River Wey. Today this old bridge, strengthened by Surrey County Council in 1993, takes the westward traffic; eastward traffic takes the new bridge alongside.

Elstead had a forge built in 1686 which is now an office.

Elstead Mill, now a pub restaurant, was occupied by Oliver Cromwell's ‘roundhead’ army during the English Civil War but subsequently burnt down. The present structure is described in its listing as being the result of several re-buildings from the 16th century.

There were two other pub restaurants in 2021, The Woolpack and The Golden Fleece, reflecting the early dependence on the local wool trade, also in 2021 three cafe's and a fish & chip shop.

During the 18th and 19th centuries, Elstead was known for the quality and quantity of carrots grown there, with daily shipments by train from nearby Milford Station up to London's Covent Garden market during the growing season. This is attributed to the light sandy soils in the village which are excellent for carrot growing.

In 1997 a millennium oak was planted at the southern apex of the village green under the auspices of the afternoon WI.

== Geography ==
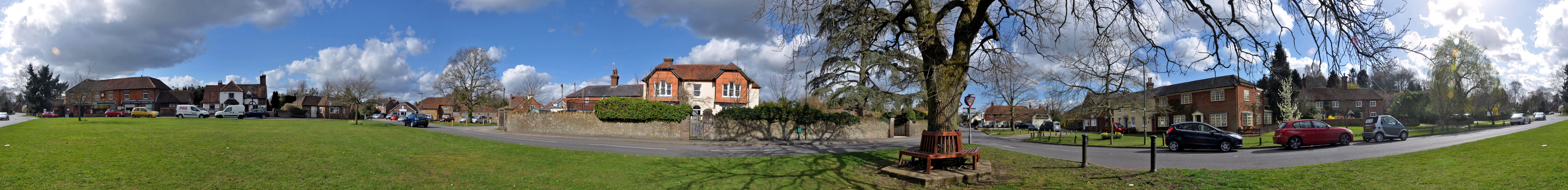
Panorama of the first village green: at the junction of the B3001 and Thursley Road. North is to the centre. By the church is a smaller green.

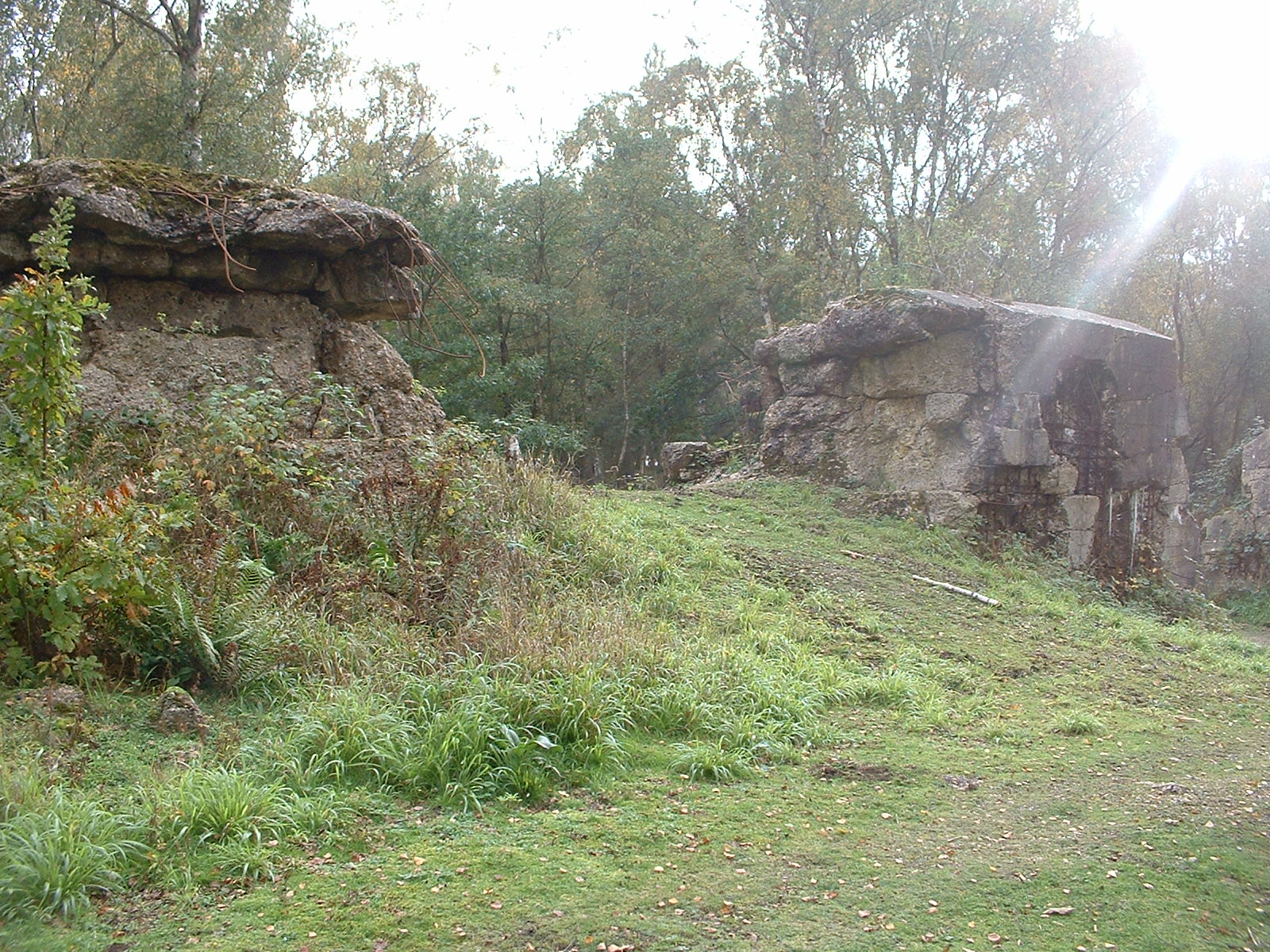
Hankley Common World War II battlements

Elstead is surrounded by woods and heathland, including Royal Common, Ockley Common, Elstead Common and Hankley Common, which is used by the British Army for training purposes and by others as a filming location. Much of the heathland area has environmental protection for rare birds, insects and reptiles.

Thundry Meadow, close to Elstead, is a Site of Special Scientific Interest (SSI) and is an important breeding area for the dragonfly and damselfly.

The area around the village has several large farms and much of the land is used for grazing for horses and cattle.

Elstead is within the Green Belt and is in an Area of Outstanding Natural Beauty. It is a popular destination for walkers and cyclists.

=== Charleshill ===
The western hamlet Charleshill, is on the opposite (left) bank of the River Wey on the B3001 to Farnham, half of the hamlet being in Tilford. Its public house is The Donkey originally called The Half-way House. The pub was converted from two small cottages in 1850, which at that time were owned by Farnham United Brewery. It acquired the nickname of "The Donkey", as before the days of motor traffic, donkeys were kept tethered outside the Inn to help horses and carts up the hill; it officially became named this in 1947.

== Demography and housing ==
2011 Census Homes
Output area	Detached	Semi-detached	Terraced	Flats and apartments	Chalet bungalows	shared between households
(Civil Parish)	521	329	139	68	34	0

The average level of accommodation in the region composed of detached houses was 28%, the average for apartments was 22.6%.

2011 Census Key Statistics
Output area	Population	Households	% Owned outright	% Owned with a loan	hectares
(Civil Parish)	2,557	1,085	44.5%	29.1%	1,104

The proportion of households in the civil parish who owned their home outright compares to the regional average of 35.1%. The proportion who owned their home with a loan compares to the regional average of 32.5%. The remaining % is made up of rented dwellings (plus a negligible % of households living rent-free).

== Education ==
St James is a nursery and primary school and was rated by Ofsted in 2024 as "Good".

Huckleberries is a forest school set up in 2020 to help children who are having difficulties at home or at school; features include arts and crafts, music, and animals and birds.

== Sports and facilities ==
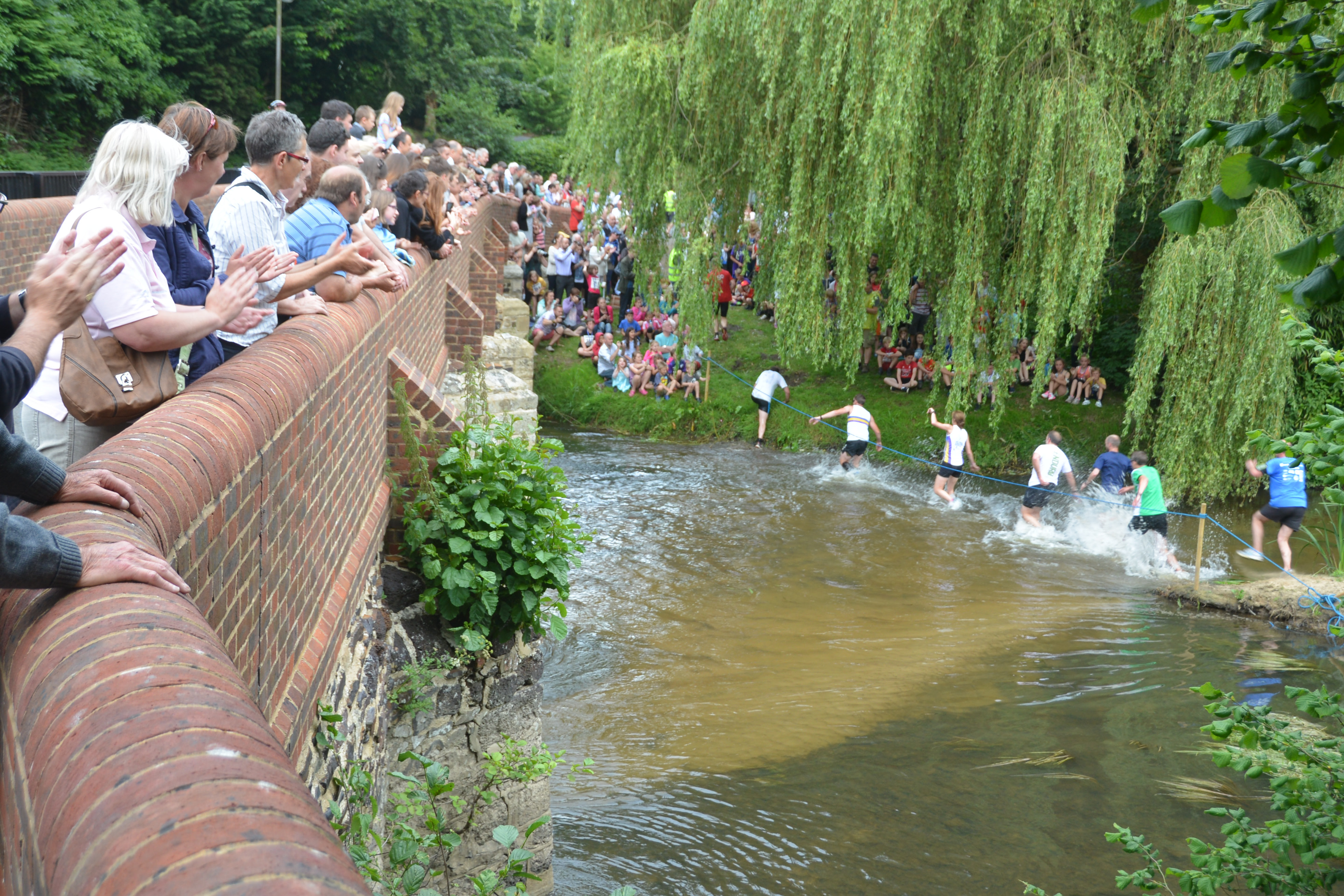
Elstead marathon.The adult five mile race at the river Wey bridge

The Elstead Village Tennis Club was formed in 1989 and now has five floodlit all weather courts and a clubhouse with parking.

Elstead Cricket Club, founded in the 1880s, are based in the self-built pavilion on the Thursley Road recreation ground.

Elstead Royal British Legion has a club house. There is a bowling green, an activity hall, and an outbuilding used as a commercial cafe.

The village hall plays host to the Elstead Badminton Club every Tuesday evening.

Elstead Sharks are the junior football club and the "Elstead Marathon" (which is actually less than six miles) has been held for over 100 years.

Elstead pancake race is held on a convenient day, near to Shrove Tuesday.

The Elstead Paper Boat Race is held every year in early July. Boats built to hold children and adults race on The Moat, a pond on Elstead Common.

== Notable residents ==
- John Black Atkins, journalist
- Sir Francis Fogarty, RAF Air Chief Marshal
- William Fraser, 3rd Baron Strathalmond
- Michael Gove, Conservative Party politician
- Philip Johnston, Cofounder and CEO of Starcloud
- Sir Brian May, guitarist with Queen
- Austin Playfoot, who carried the Olympic torch in 1948 and 2012
- Toby Roberts, British Olympic climber
- Peter Sellers, actor who lived in Cutmill Lane
- Ringo Starr, drummer who lived in Cutmill Lane in the house previously owned by Peter Sellers
- Sir John Sunderland, former President of the CBI
- Peter Thomas, Baron Thomas of Gwydir, former Secretary of State for Wales
