= All Saints' Church, Grayswood =

Church in Surrey, England

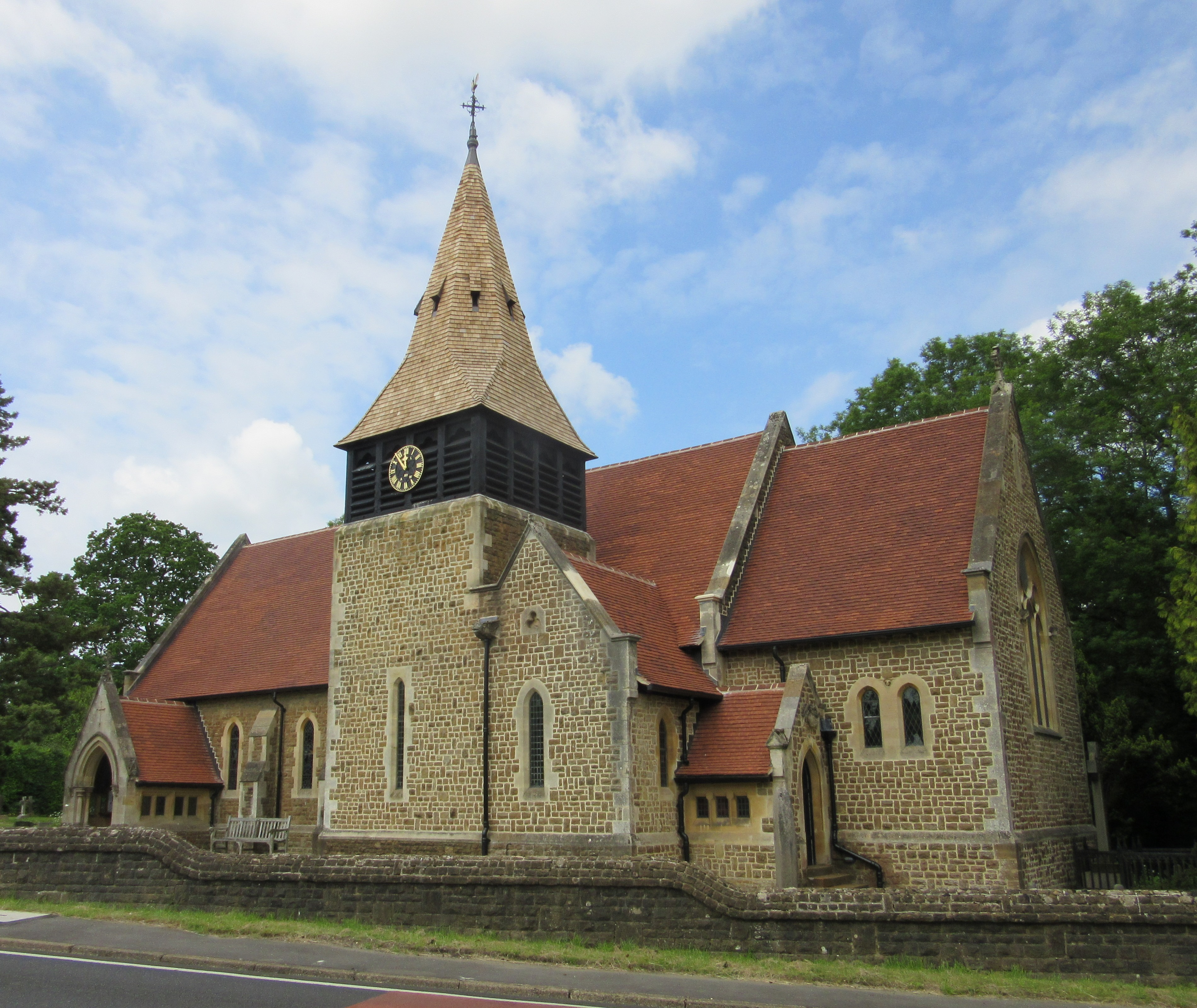

- Location in Surrey
- 51°06′18″N 0°41′29″W
- Denomination: Church of England
- Website: All Saints

History
- Dedication: All Saints

Architecture
- Functional status: Church of England parish church
- Heritage designation: Grade II
- Designated: 19 September 1977
- Architect: Axel Haig
- Style: Arts and Crafts

Administration
- Province: Canterbury
- Diocese: Guildford
- Archdeaconry: Surrey
- Deanery: Guildford
- Parish: United Benefice of Haslemere and Grayswood

Clergy
- Vicar: Rev Fiona Gwynn

All Saints' Church is an active parish church in the village of Grayswood, Surrey, England. The church stands in the centre of the village and was built between 1900 and 1902. Designed by the Swedish artist Axel Haig, who lived in the village and is buried in the graveyard, the church is a Grade II listed building.

== History ==
The village of Grayswood stands to the north of the town of Haslemere. The parish of Grayswood was established in 1901 as a condition for the funding of a new church by Alfred Hugh Harman. Harman, a pioneer of photography and the founder of Ilford Photo, had moved to the village in 1894. In addition to funding the construction of the church, Harman paid for a vicarage and provided an endowment for the provision of a stipend to the incumbent vicar. Harman engaged his friend Axel Haig to undertake the designs for the church. Haig, born in Sweden in 1835, had moved to Scotland in 1856, and subsequently to London in 1859. He established himself as an artist, and became highly sought after as an architectural illustrator by many of the leading architects of the Victorian era. (Note: Haig produced designs for a number of projects initiated by William Burges, including the "artistically magnificent", but unsuccessful, designs for the Royal Courts of Justice. George Edmund Street, whose designs won out, reportedly remarked, "I wouldn't mind being beaten by drawings like those.") The church was built between 1900 and 1902, and was consecrated on 13 February 1902 by Randall Davidson, Bishop of Winchester. (Note: Randall Davidson subsequently served as Archbishop of Canterbury from 1903 to 1928.)

The church remains an active parish church within the United Benefice of Haslemere and Grayswood, celebrating its 120th anniversary in February 2022.

== Architecture ==
Haig designed the church in the style of 13th century English Gothic. Historic England notes that it has many "Arts and Crafts elements". It also draws on Haig's Scandinavian heritage, in particular through its extensive use of wood, both internally and externally. (Note: The Church of England describes All Saints' as Surrey's only "Swedish Gothic" church.) The bell tower is timbered, as are the internal ceilings, and the tower and the lychgate are roofed in wood shingles. The body of the church is constructed of Bargate stone. Some of the stained glass is by Carl Almquist, like Haig an immigrant from Sweden, while other windows are by Charles Eamer Kempe.

The church is a Grade II listed building. The churchyard walls and lychgate have a separate Grade II listing. Haig died at Grayswood in 1921 and is buried under a memorial stone of his own design, which is also listed. His church has not always been appreciated; the notoriously acerbic critic Ian Nairn, in the Surrey volume of the Pevsner Buildings of England, wrote, "All Saints fits happily enough into the distant view, with its cosy timbered bell-turret facing the green, but is bad close-to."

== Gallery ==
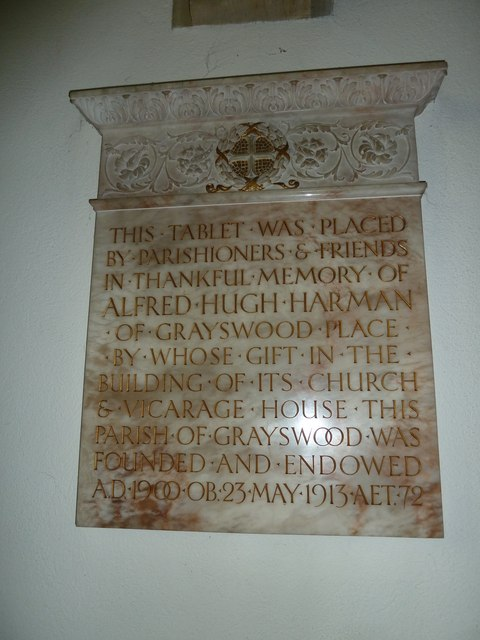
Memorial plaque to Alfred Hugh Harman

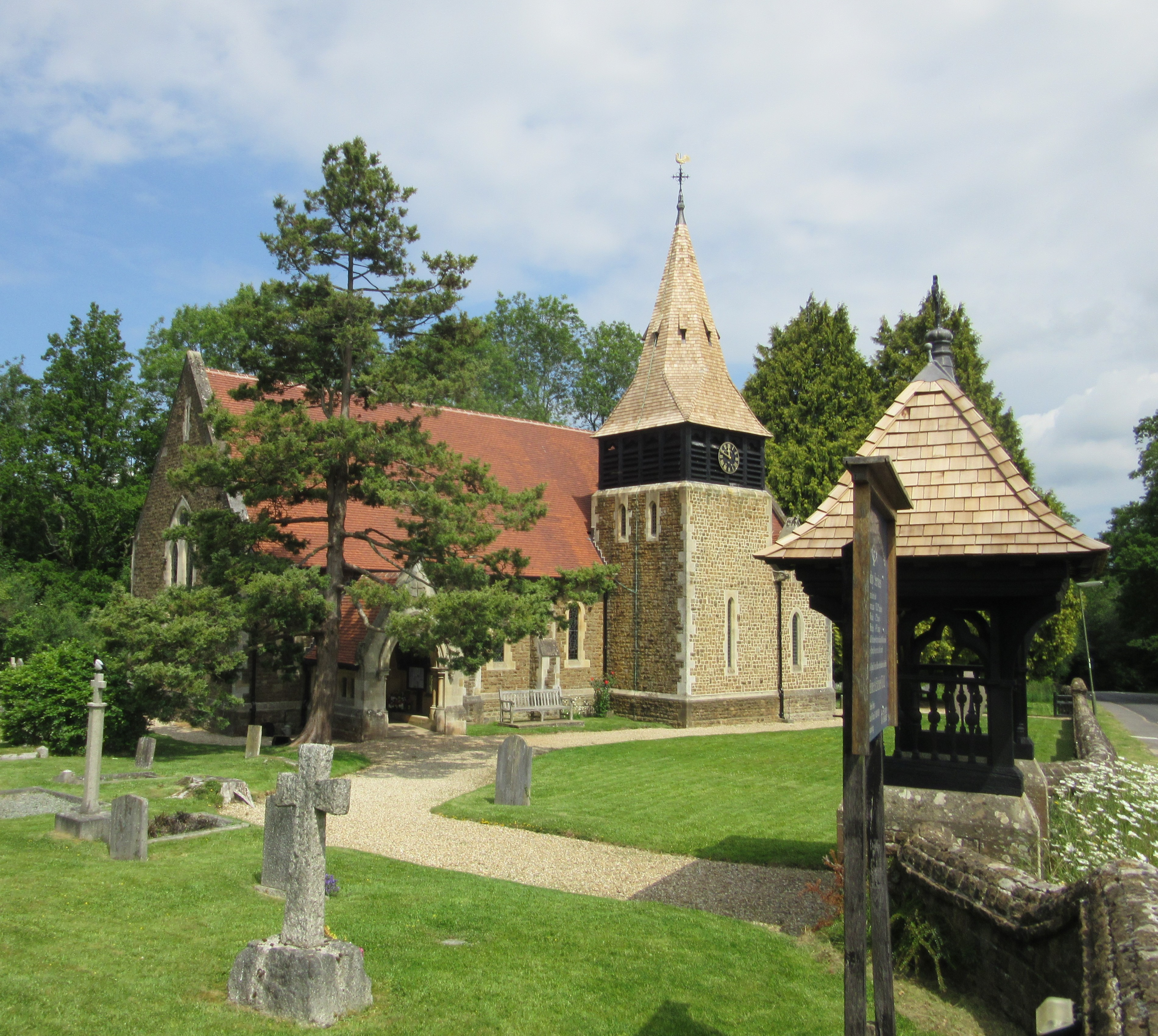
View of the church with lychgate

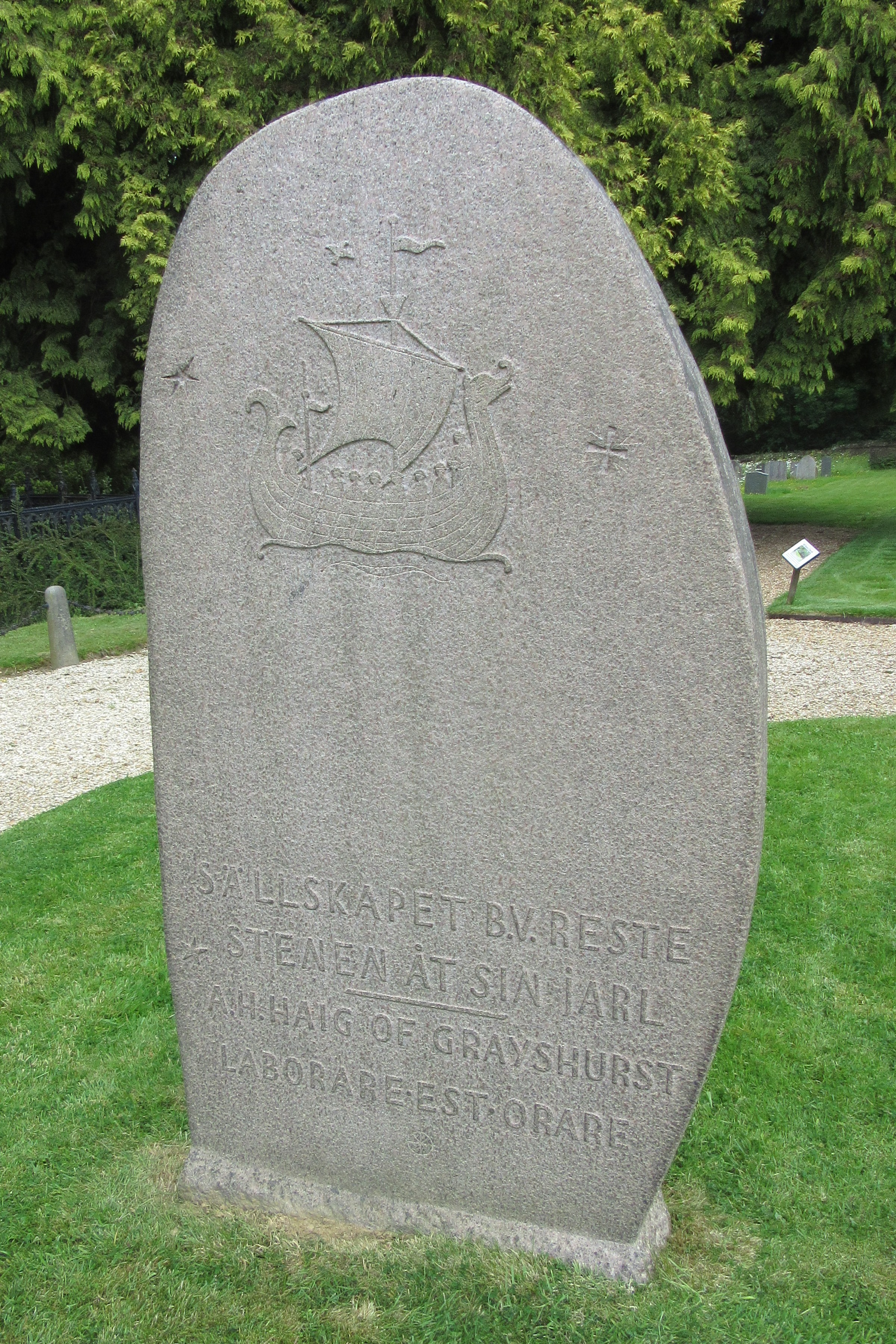
Axel Haig's headstone

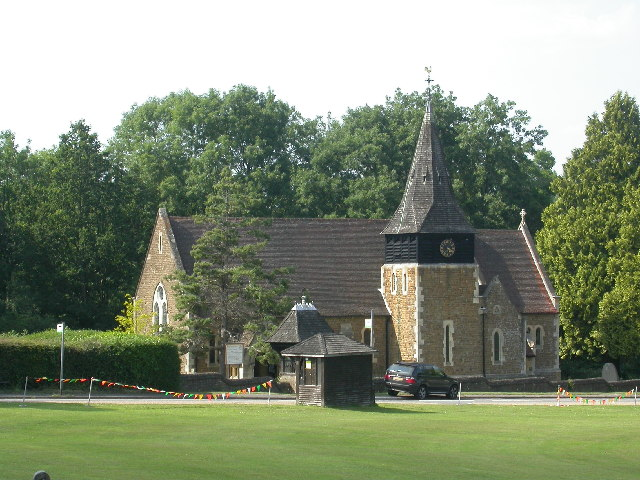
A distant view of the church across the green, of which Ian Nairn approved

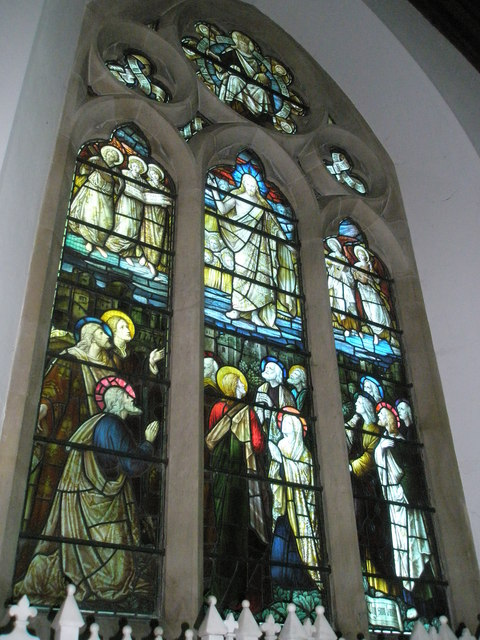
The East window by Carl Almquist

== See also ==
- Media related to All Saints Church, Grayswood at Wikimedia Commons
- List of places of worship in Waverley (borough)

== Sources ==
- Crook, J. Mordaunt; Lennox-Boyd, C. A. (1984). Axel Haig and the Victorian Vision of the Middle Ages. London: George Allen and Unwin. ISBN 0-04-720029-4.
- Crook, J. Mordaunt (2013). William Burges and the High Victorian Dream. London: Frances Lincoln. ISBN 978-0-711-23349-2.
- Nairn, Ian; Pevsner, Nikolaus (1971) [1962]. Surrey. The Buildings of England (2nd ed.). Harmondsworth: Penguin Books. ISBN 0-300-09675-5.
