= HSwMS Konung Gustaf III =

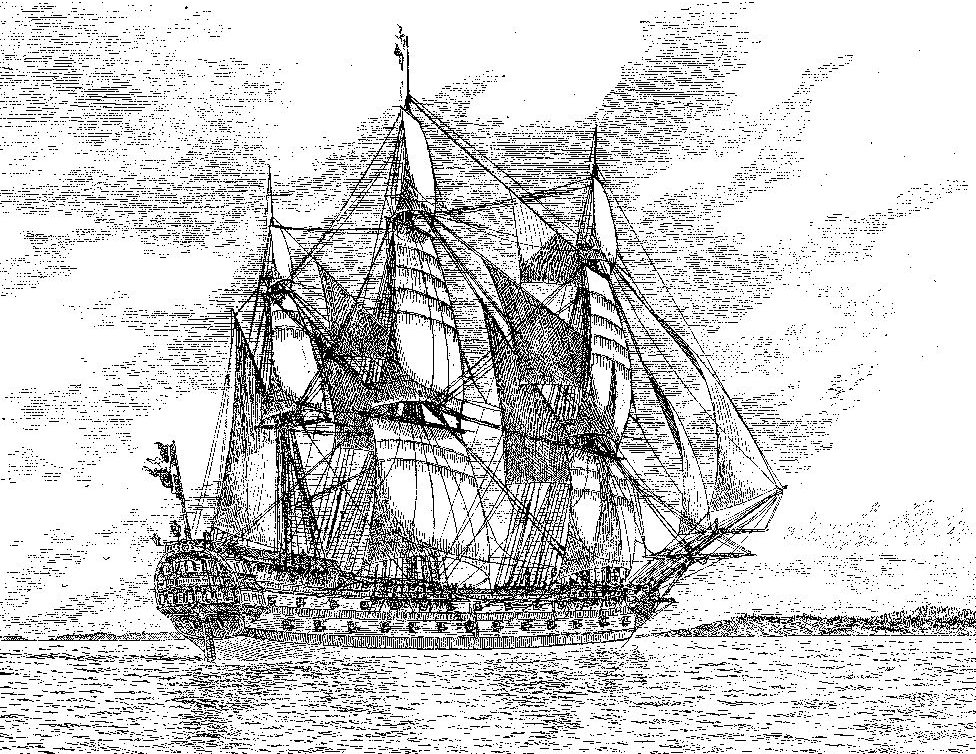
- Konung Gustaf III at sea. Etching by Jacob Hägg.

History

Sweden
- Builder: Karlskrona Naval Shipyard
- Launched: 1777
- Decommissioned: 1825
- Fate: Decommissioned and broken up in 1825

General characteristics
- Length: 51.67 m (169 ft 6 in)
- Beam: 13.46 m (44 ft 2 in)
- Draft: 6.24 m (20 ft 6 in)
- Armament: 70 guns of various calibers across two gun decks
- Notes: Designed by Fredrik Henrik af Chapman; flagship during the Russo-Swedish War (1788–1790) under Duke Charles of Södermanland.

HSwMS Konung Gustaf III was a ship of the line in the Swedish Navy. It was armed with 70 guns of various calibers across two gun decks. Konung Gustaf III was built at the Karlskrona Naval Shipyard from designs by Fredrik Henrik af Chapman and launched in 1777.

== Service History ==
During the Russo-Swedish War (1788–1790), under the command of Eric af Klint, she served as the flagship of the line fleet commanded by Duke Charles of Södermanland in his role as Grand Admiral, and took part in the battles of Hogland (1788), Öland’s southern cape (1789), and the Battle of Vyborg Bay (1790). The ship also participated in the Swedish-British squadron operating in the Gulf of Finland during the Finnish War of 1808–09, after which she was used as a blockship in Karlskrona. Between 1812 and 1814, she was briefly returned to service in the line fleet but was finally decommissioned in 1825 and subsequently broken up.

== Gallery ==
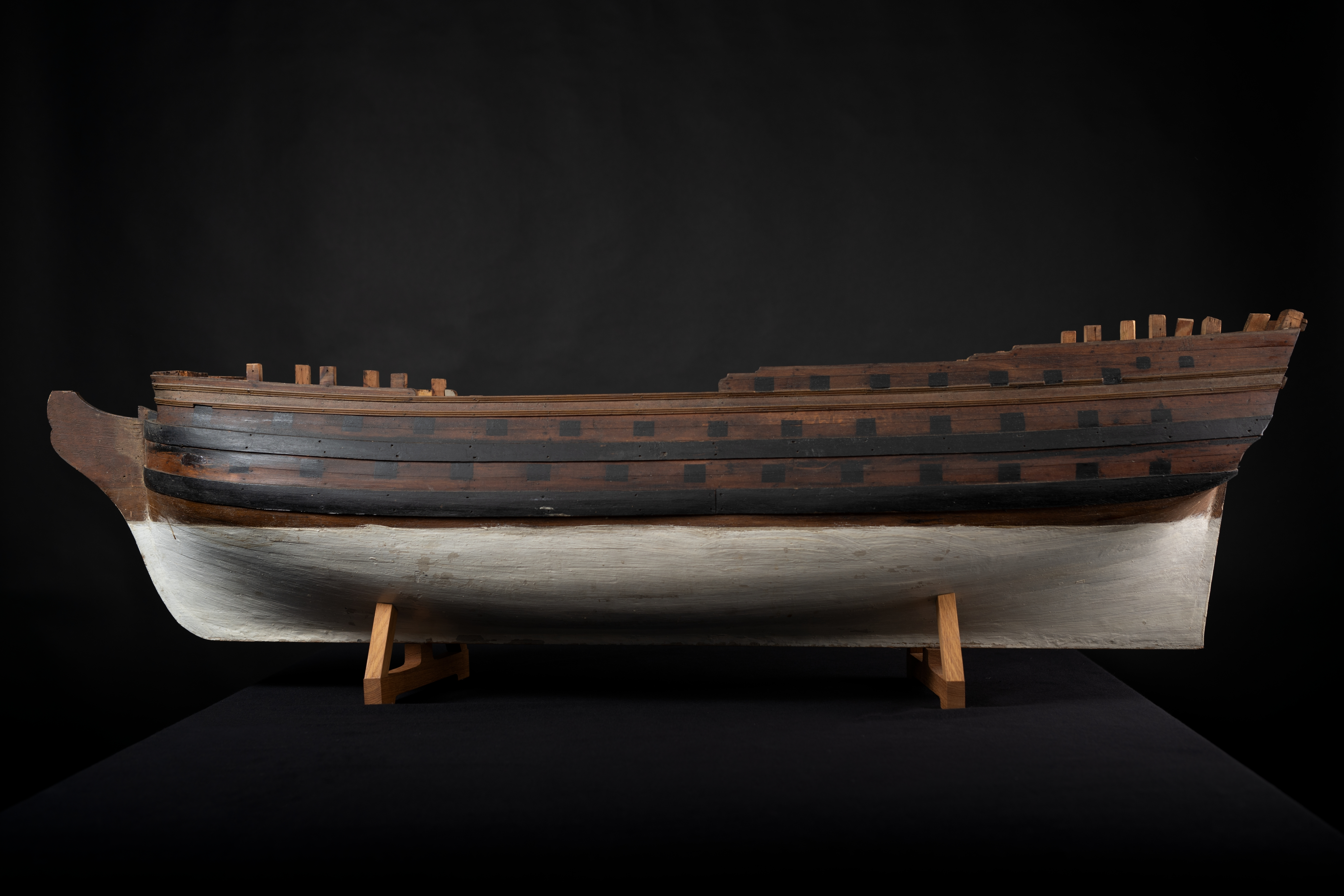
Model showing the hull design of Konung Gustaf III.

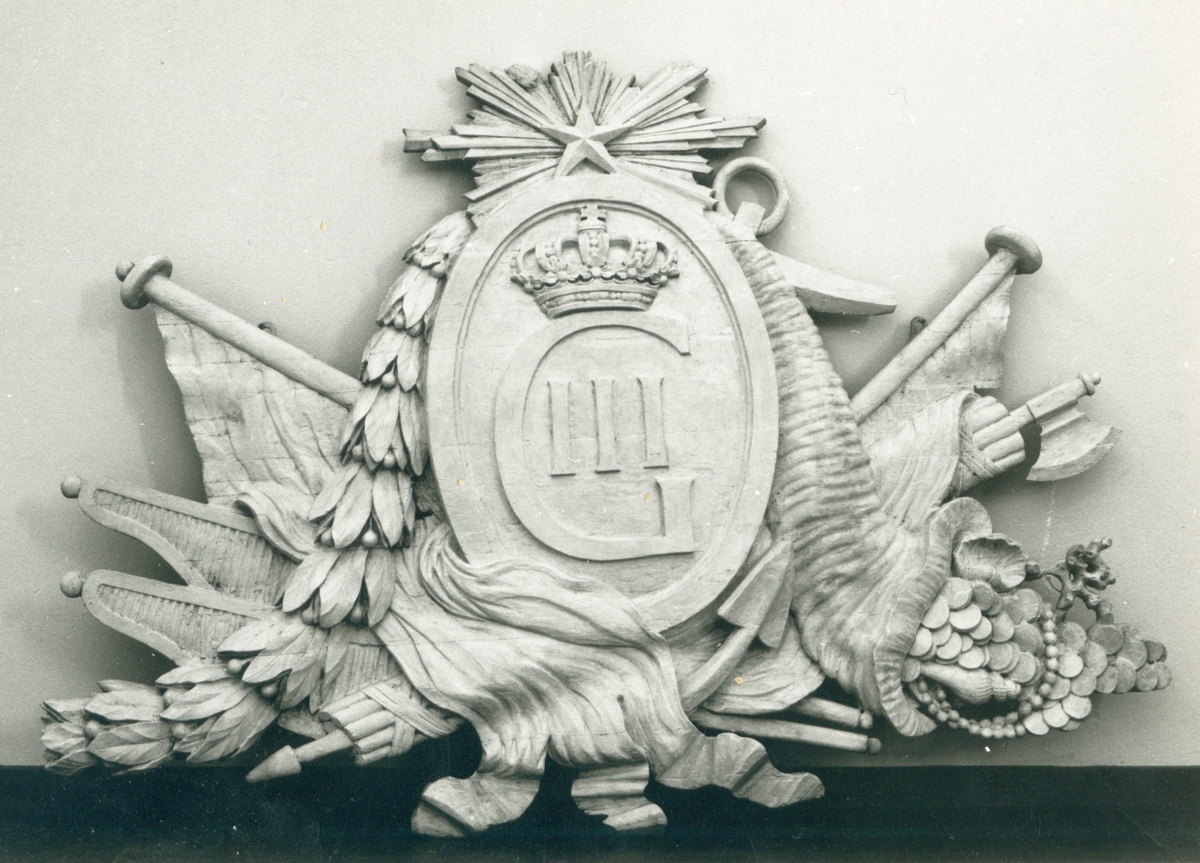
Konung Gustaf III's stern ornament at the Swedish National Maritime Museum in Stockholm.

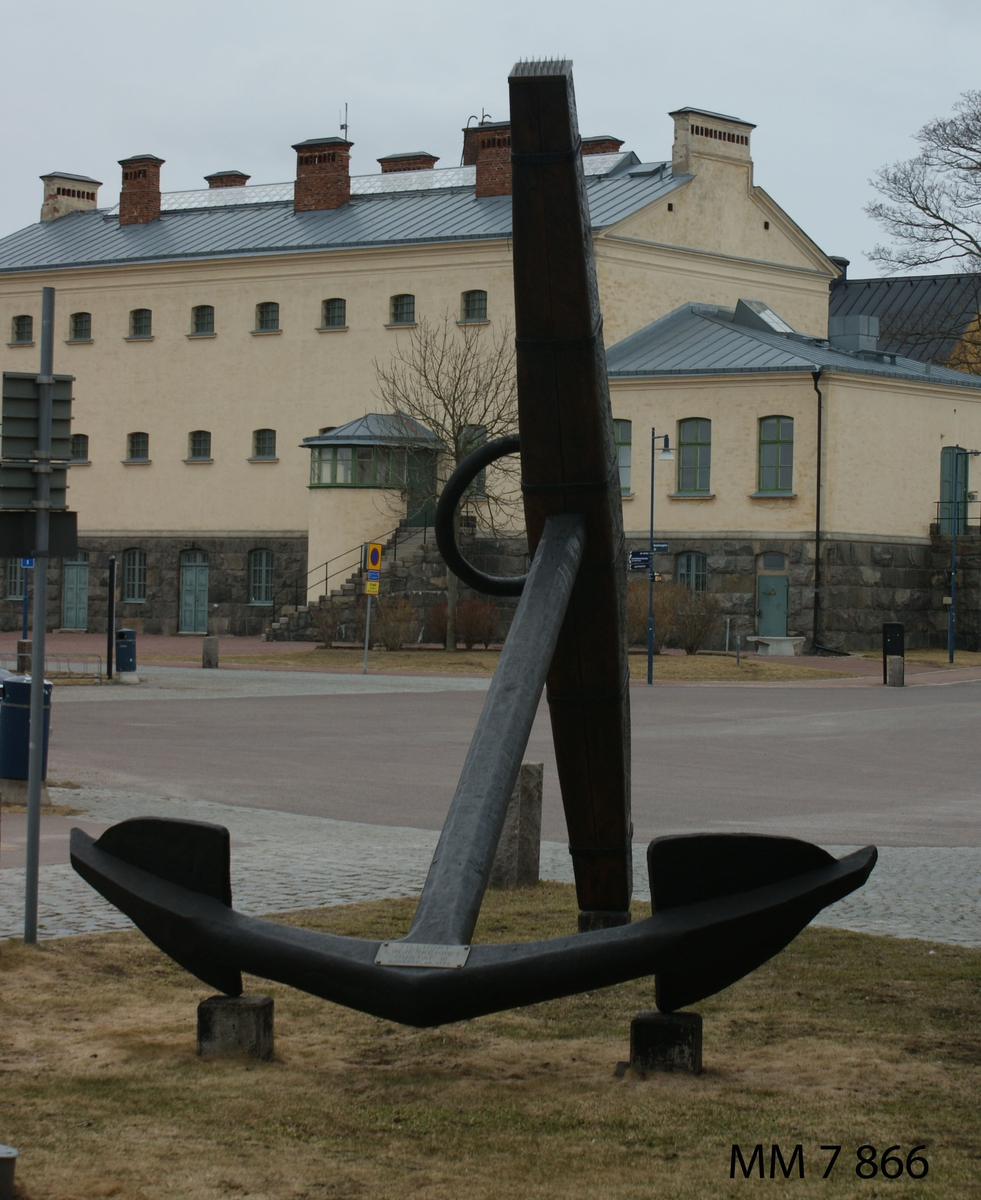
Anchor belonging to Konung Gustaf III, outside the Naval Museum in Karlskrona.

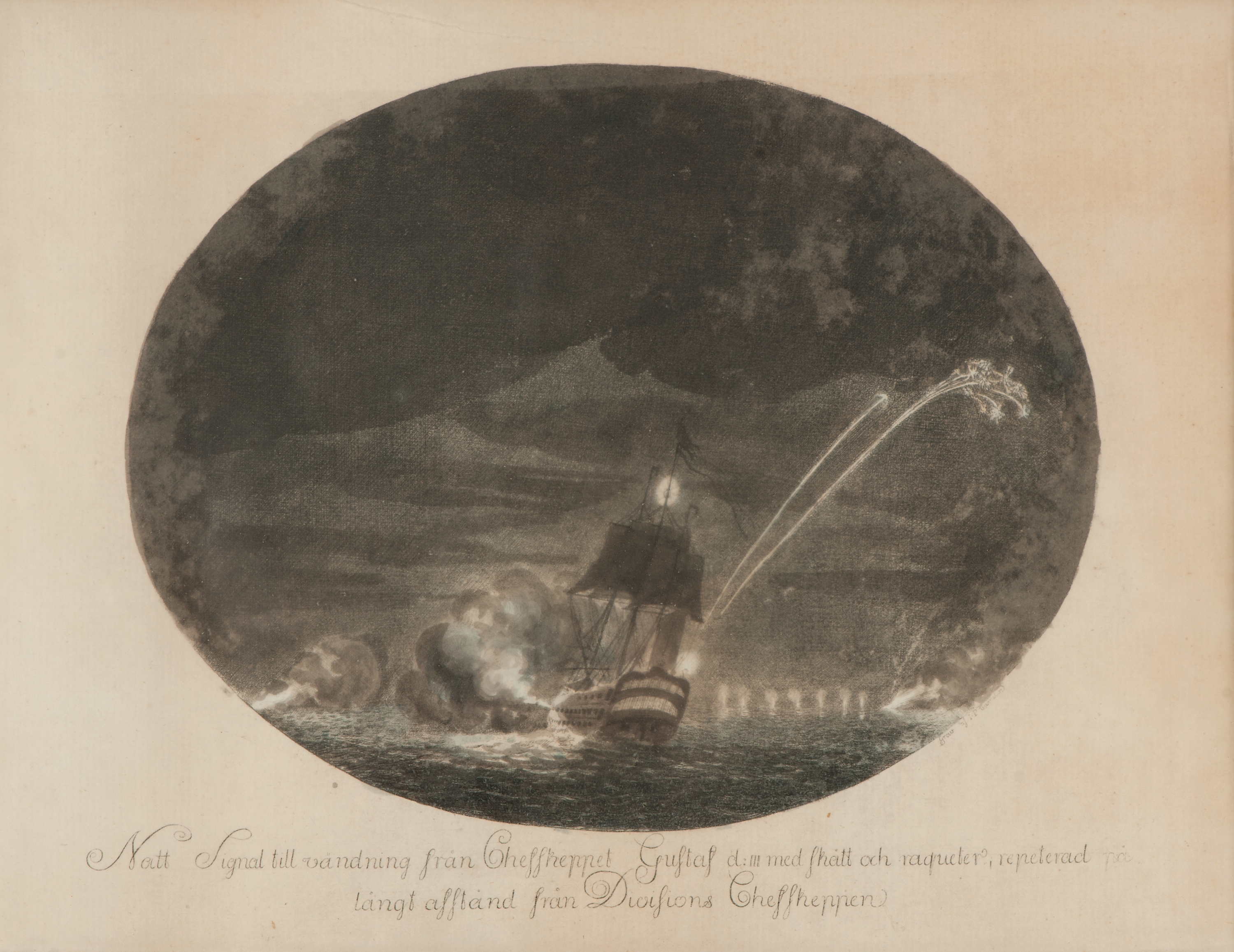
Konung Gustaf III giving the night signal "Ready to tack" during the Russo-Swedish War. Watercolor by Johan Petter Cumelin.

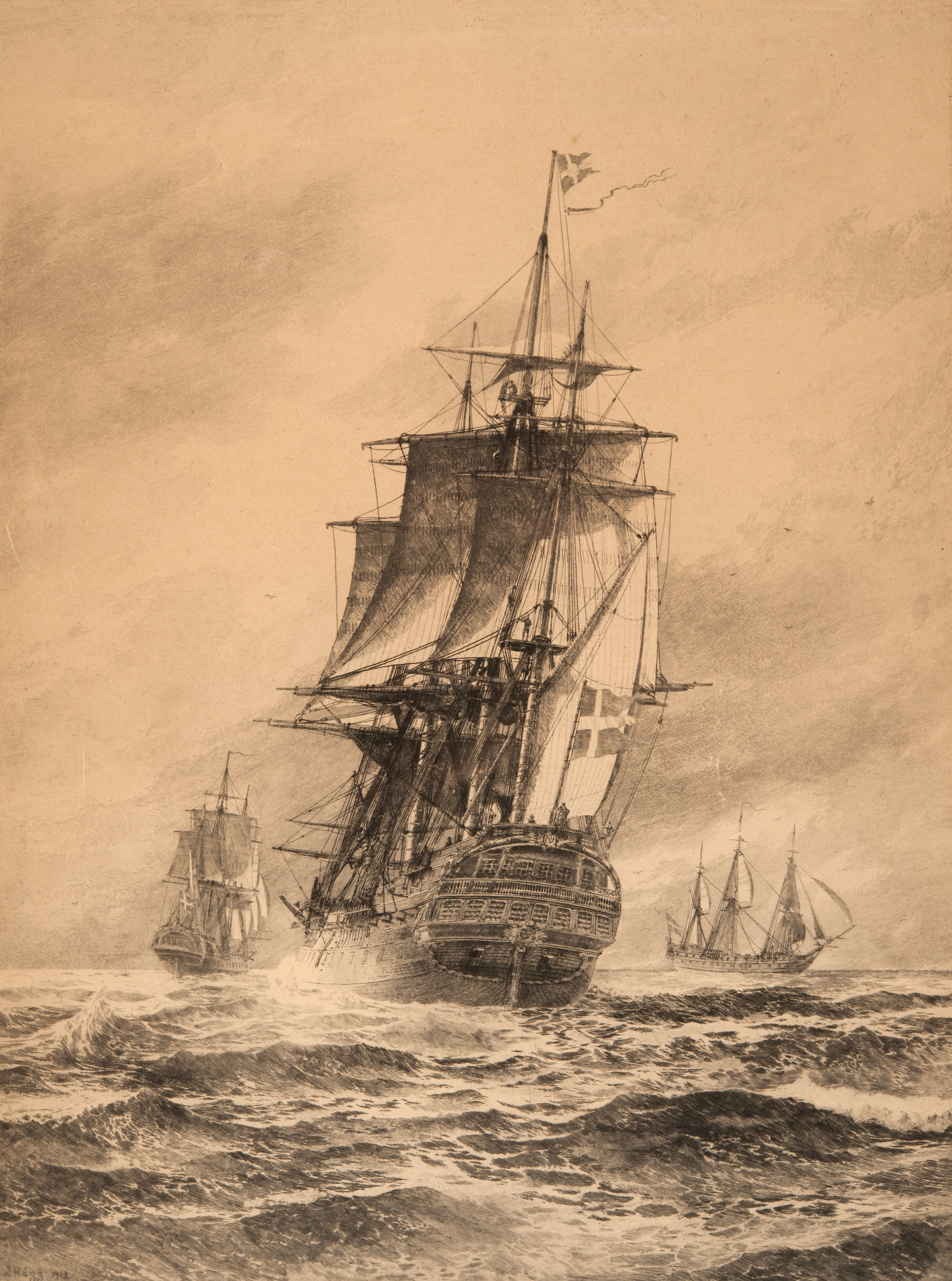
Konung Gustaf III by Jacob Hägg.
