= HSwMS Carl XIII =

Swedish ship

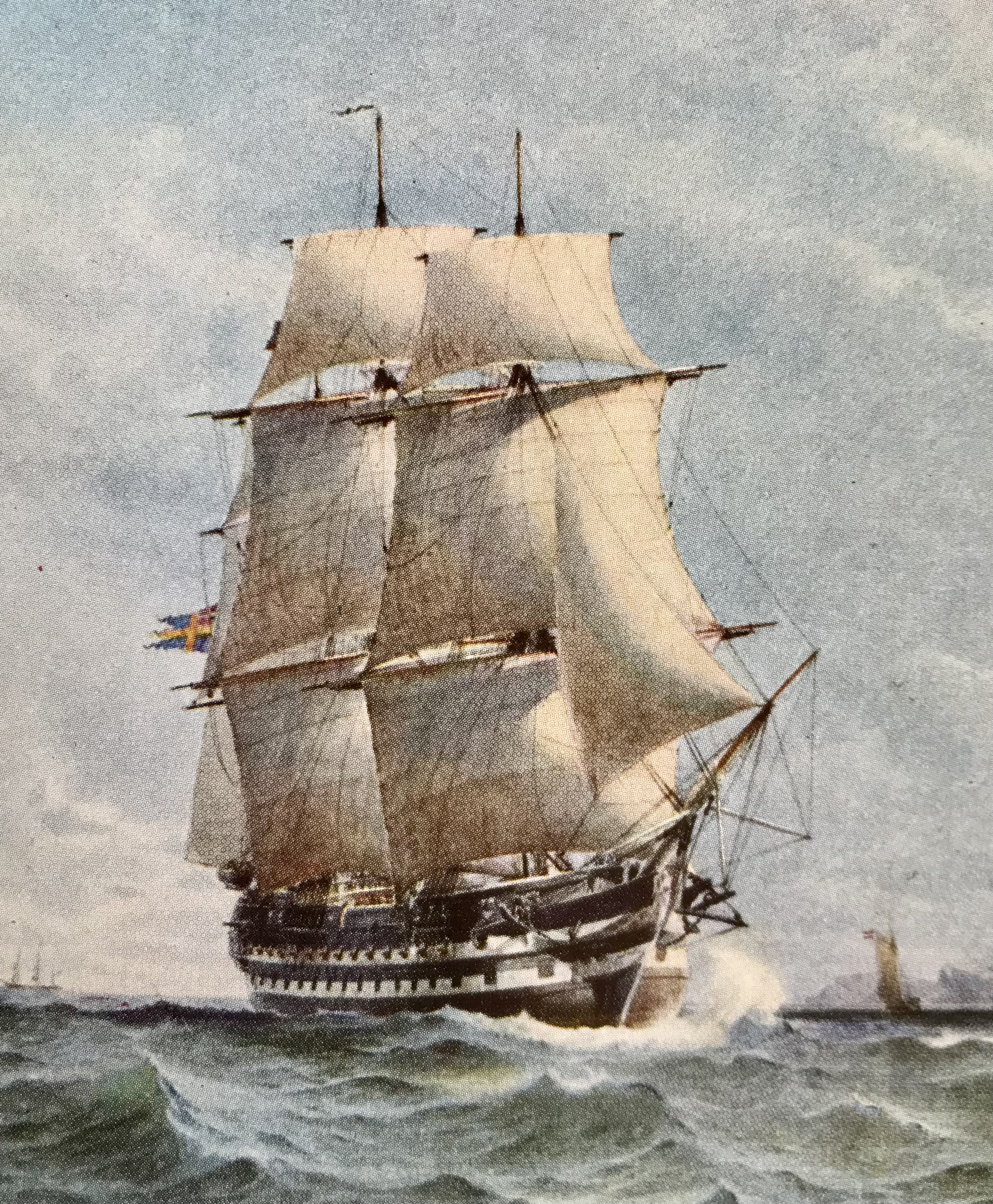
- Carl XIII under sail off the southern Norwegian coast during a Swedish-Danish-Norwegian squadron exercise in July 1853. Watercolor by Jacob Hägg, 1884.

History

Sweden
- Name: Carl XIII
- Namesake: Charles XIII of Sweden
- Builder: Karlskrona Naval Shipyard
- Laid down: 16 May 1805
- Launched: 19 July 1819
- Commissioned: 1819
- Decommissioned: 15 December 1862
- Fate: Used for mine explosion tests; broken up in 1865

General characteristics
- Type: Ship of the line
- Displacement: 2,610 tons
- Length: 53.91 m (176 ft 10 in)
- Beam: 14.69 m (48 ft 2 in)
- Draft: 6.63 m (21 ft 9 in)
- Complement: 658
- Armament: 74 guns

HSwMS Carl XIII (originally launched as Drottning Fredrika Dorotea Vilhelmina) was a Swedish ship of the line in the Royal Swedish Navy. She was the second of three ships in the Konung Gustav IV Adolf class, alongside Konung Gustav IV Adolf (1799) (renamed Gustaf den Store in 1811) and Carl XIV Johan. Built at the Karlskrona Naval Shipyard to designs by Fredrik Henrik af Chapman, she was launched on 19 July 1819. Her armament consisted of 74 guns of varying calibers mounted on two covered gun decks.

== Service history ==
During the summer of 1853, Carl XIII took part in a joint Swedish-Norwegian-Danish squadron exercise in the North Sea. The squadron was commanded by Rear Admiral Salomon Mauritz von Krusenstierna, with Prince Oscar serving as flotilla captain.

In the summer of 1854, the ship participated in another squadron deployment alongside Norwegian vessels in the Baltic Sea. The squadron was tasked with transporting Swedish troops to Gotland as part of Sweden’s defensive preparations during the Crimean War. This deployment was also led by Krusenstierna, with Prince Oscar again as flotilla captain.

Carl XIII was decommissioned on 15 December 1862. She was later used for mine explosion testing before being scrapped in 1865.
