= Gefle (disambiguation) =

Gefle is an old spelling of Gävle, a city in Sweden.

"Gefle" may also refer to

- Gefle IF, a sports club
- HSwMS Gefle, a ship
