= Stora Hästnäs =

Coordinates: 57°39′36.6″N 18°21′48.6″E

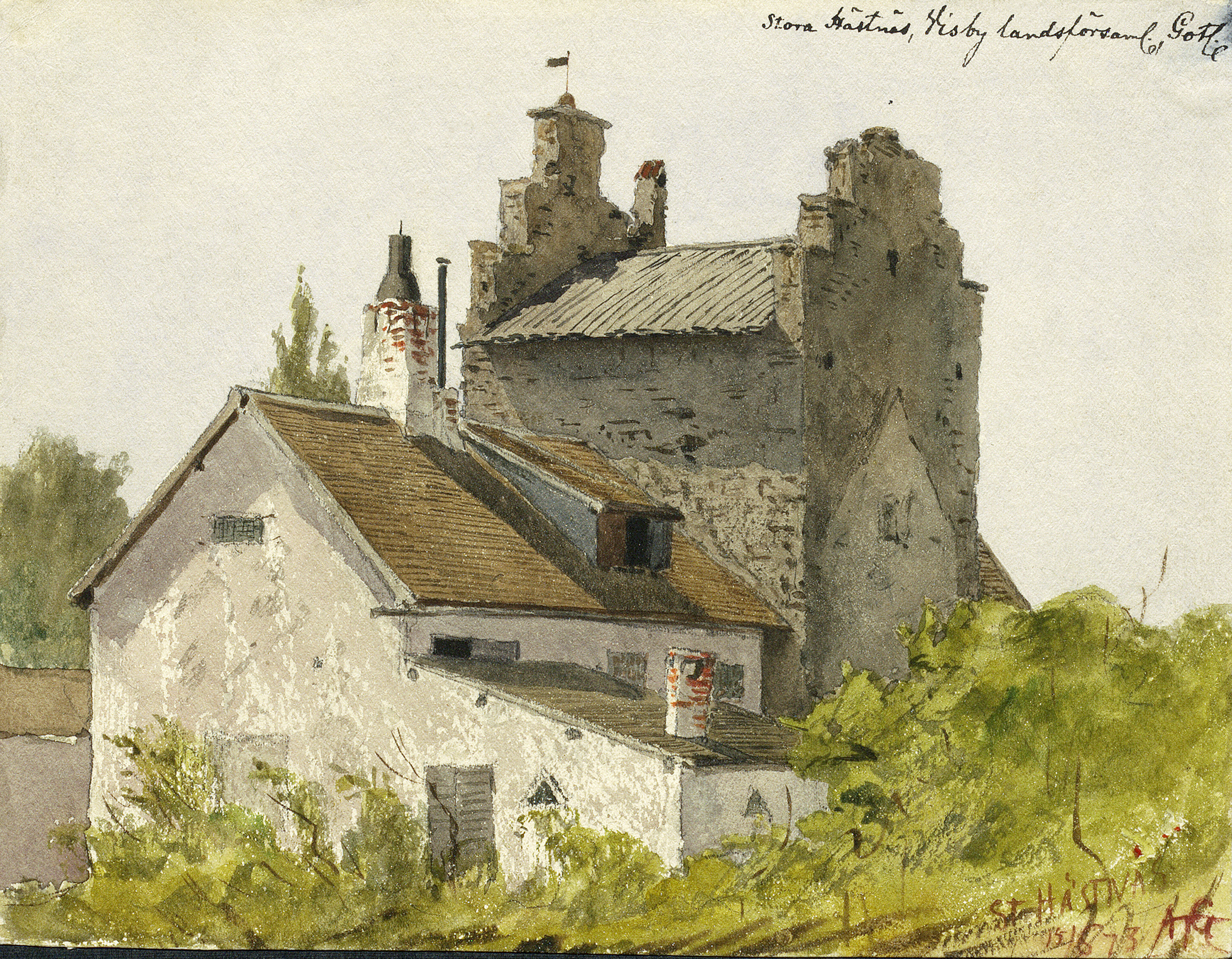
Stora Hästnäs. watercolor by A.T. Gellerstedt from June 15, 1873

Stora Hästnäs is an estate on the island Gotland, not far from Visby, Sweden. It is known mainly for its well preserved medieval era stone house dating from the 1300s. It is the most well-preserved medieval residential building on Gotland outside Visby.

== History ==
The medieval limestone building is four stories tall and decorated with crow-stepped gables. A three-window gallery adorns the southern façade, and above it a door designed to bring merchandise and supplies to the top, storage floor. Originally the presently visible building was only the middle section of a considerably larger building.

The medieval building has a basement and a ground floor which contained living quarters and a fireplace. A round archway leads into the first floor. The entrance gate shows traces of having been decoratively sculpted. Above it, a room that looks out the three windows on the south façade was probably used as living quarters during the summer months, and for festivities. Above it lies the top story, reserved for storage.

The building is similar in style to contemporary city houses in Visby, and may have been commissioned by a Visby burgher living on the countryside. In 1925 a restoration was carried out with elements of reconstruction. It is a listed building and is privately owned. However, for visitors it is accessible.

== Gallery ==
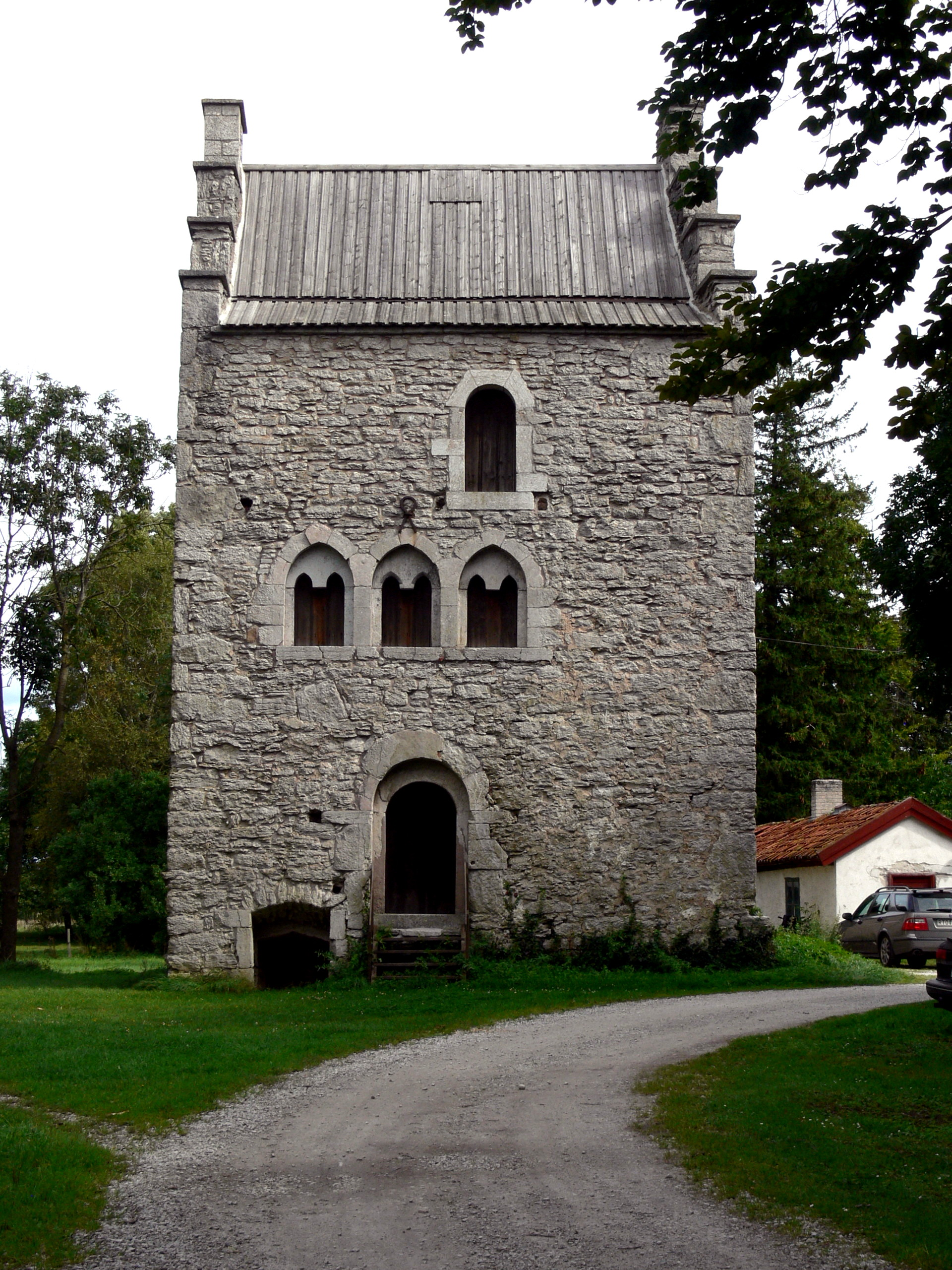
Medieval era stone house

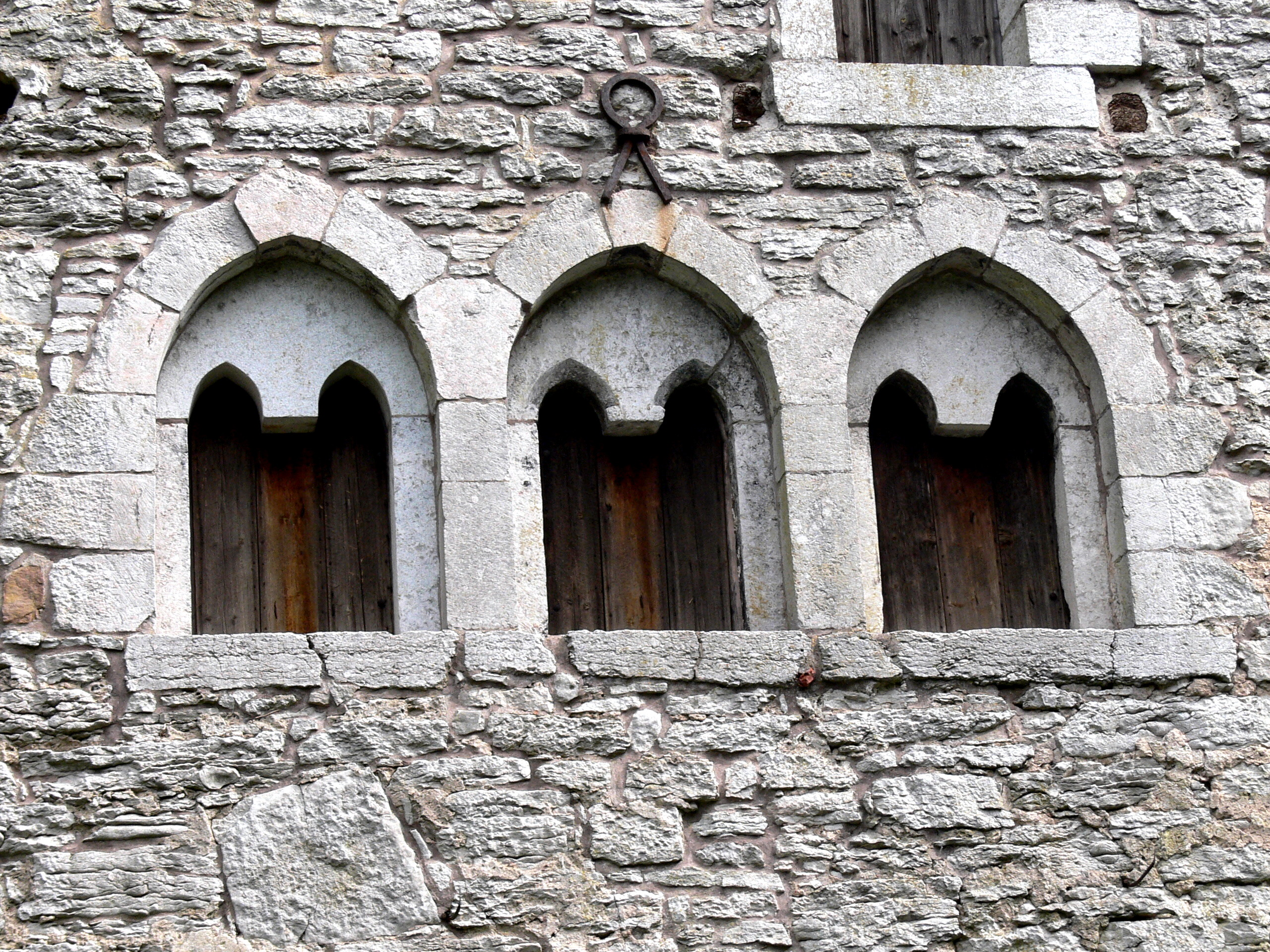
Three-window gallery

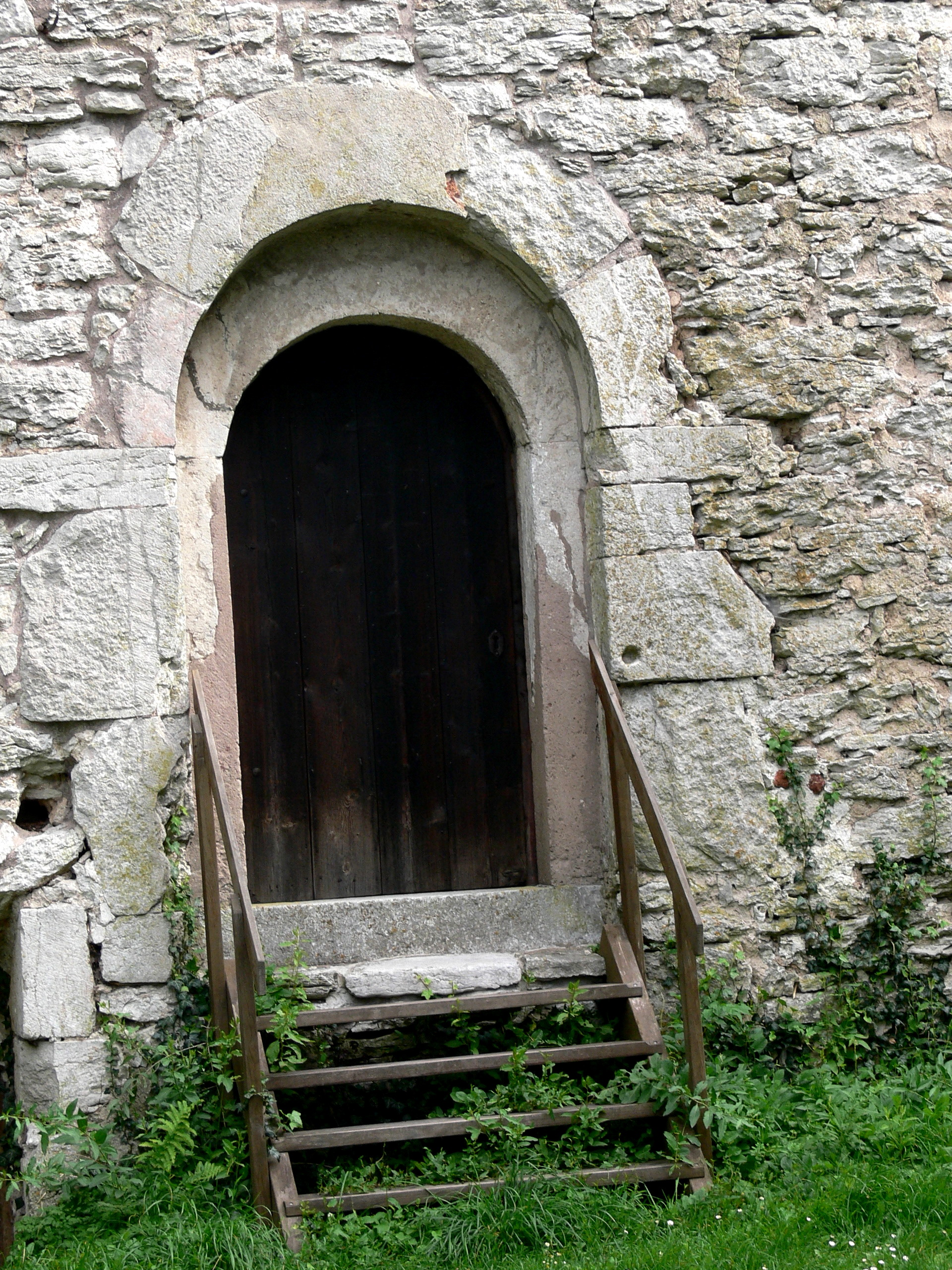
Round archway

== See also ==
- Katthamra
