= Katthamra =

Coordinates: 57°25′55″N 18°51′07″E

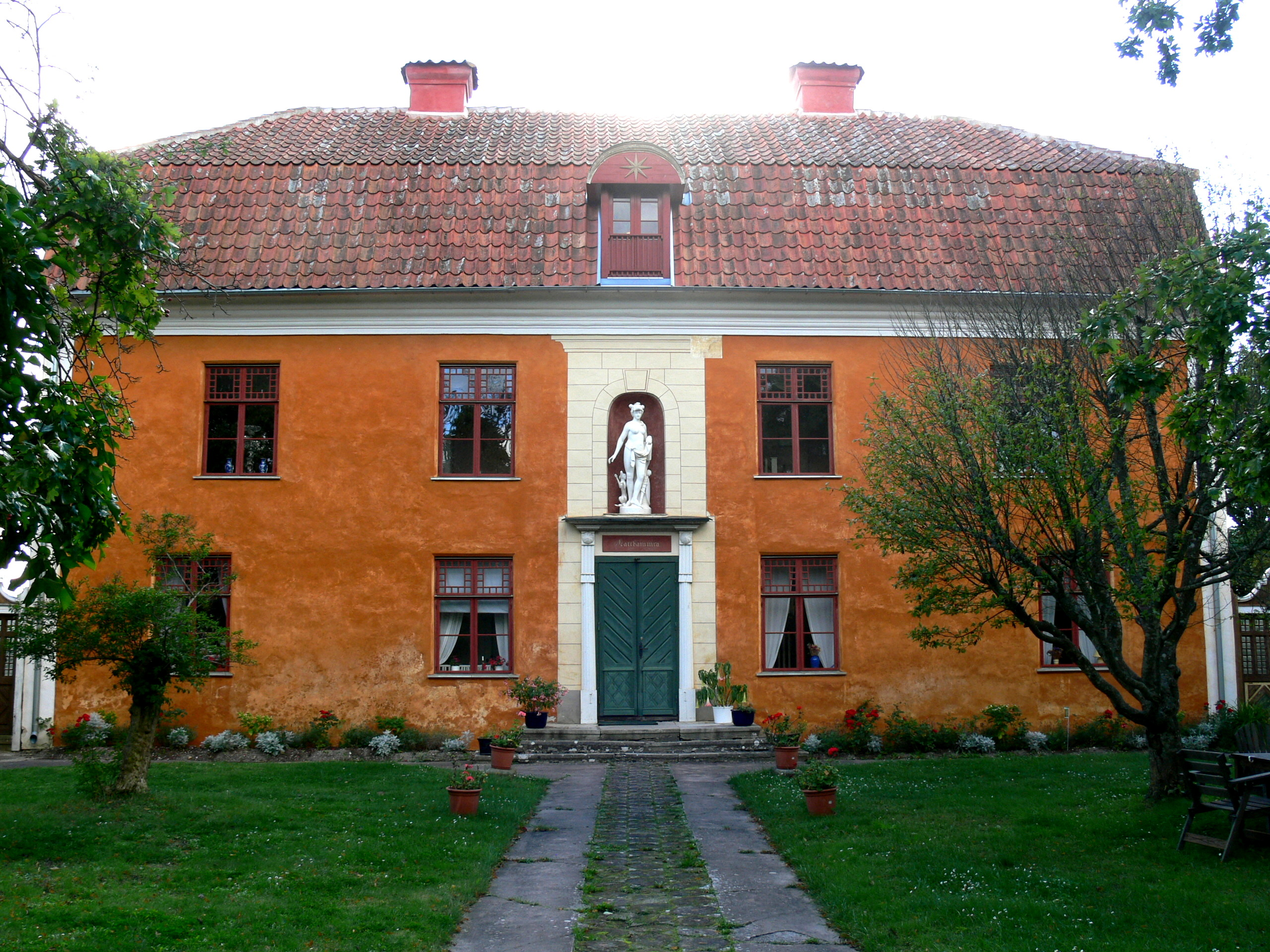
Katthamra

Katthamra (Katthamra gård) is a manor house located at Katthammarsvik in Östergarn on the island Gotland, Sweden. Apart from the main building, several annexes and a garden belong to the estate. The main building has undergone several renovations but is a fine example of 1800s upper-class accommodation, with magnificent murals. The estate has recently undergone a major renovation. Six buildings have new roofs and three have been prepared for rental.

== History ==
The estate dates from the Middle Ages. The first known owner was Peder Fleming, who bought the farm in 1652. In the late 18th century, Katthamra was acquired by merchant andshipbuilder Jacob Dubbe (1769–1844). Among the owners of the house were Nils Ihre, ancestor of philologist and historical linguist Johan Ihre (1707–1780).

In the early 19th century, the farm was sold to Axel Hägg, whose descendants owned the farm for 150 years. Best known were architect and artist Axel Herman Hägg (Haig, 1835–1921) and his brother Rear Admiral Jacob Hägg (1839–1931).

Katthamra is an unusual example of a manor house on Gotland, where such buildings are uncommon. During the 18th and 19th centuries the owners of the estate earned a lot of money from limestone extraction. The main building dates largely from the 18th century but was originally much smaller. The presently visible main building was enlarged in 1805 into the presently visible Neoclassical building. It is a two-storey house with a hip roof. Above the main entrance there is a statue of Diana. The house has some profusely painted interiors, made by artist Jonas Torssén.

== See also ==
- Stora Hästnäs
