= Alfred Hugh Harman =

English pioneer of photography (b.1841 – d.1913)

Alfred Hugh Harman (1841 – 23 May 1913) was a pioneer of photography and founder of Ilford Limited.

He established a photography business in Peckham in 1862 using William Fox Talbot’s Calotype negative/positive printing process. In 1864 he was advertising enlargements using solar cameras and artificial light.

In 1879 Harman abandoned his photographic studio and moved to Ilford village where he began manufacturing dry gelatine plates in the basement of his new home in Cranbrook Road on the corner with Park Avenue. As business grew, he expanded his workplace into the ground floor and employed two men and three boys. His early processes were rudimentary—he applied his emulsion formula with a teapot—but the huge growth in the photography market gave him the revenue he needed to build purpose-built premises in 1883. These 'Britannia Works' went public in 1891, were relaunched as The Britannia Works (1898) Limited in 1898. In 1900 they were renamed Ilford Limited, despite objections from the Ilford Urban District Council, who argued that being the area's largest employer did not give the company the right to assume the town's name.

Harman retired from the company in 1897 due to ill health, but returned around the time of the renaming. By then he held a substantial share in the company. He favoured a proposal by George Eastman that Kodak and Ilford should merge in 1902. However, the directors of the much smaller Ilford perceived it as a takeover attempt, and Harman was persuaded to reject the proposal.

Harman married a Dublin-born widow, Nina Knobble, who had a son George from her first marriage.

In 1894 Harman moved to Grayswood, Surrey. In 1900 he offered to finance a church in Grayswood, on land given by Lord Derby, on the condition that a parish be created there. In 1901, the new parish of Grayswood was formed from parts of the old parishes of Witley, Chiddingfold, Haslemere and Thursley and All Saints' Church was consecrated in 1902.

== Bibliography ==
- R Hercock and G Jones, Silver by the Ton: A History of Ilford Limited 1879-1979. (London: McGraw-Hill, 1979)
