= Herman af Sillén =

Swedish naval officer and painter (1857–1908)

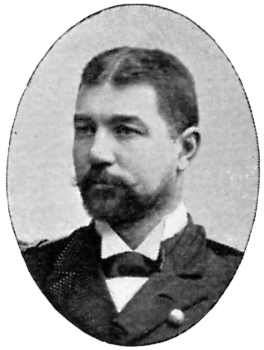
Herman af Sillén

Herman Gustaf af Sillén (20 May 1857 – 29 December 1908) was as Swedish naval officer and marine artist.

== Biography ==
He was born in Stockholm. In 1870, he joined the Swedish Navy as a cadet, was promoted to underlöjtnant in 1876 and Commander in 1897. For 15 years he served on board the royal yacht, Drott (1877); from 1898 he was the commander of the ship.

In parallel to his military career, he was active as a marine painter. He took painting lessons from Hulda Schenson in Stockholm, but also from Norwegian painter Frithjof Smith-Hald in Paris and Hans Gude in Berlin. He mostly painted marine subjects, including ship portraits and landscapes. In addition to painting, he was also engaged (together with his colleague Jacob Hägg) in promoting the establishment of a maritime museum in Stockholm (which was established after his death).

His art was appreciated by among others the Swedish king, Oscar II; Herman af Sillén depicted the two together on the deck of Drott in one of his paintings. The German Emperor Wilhelm II and the Queen of Romania also bought paintings by Herman af Sillén. In general he had some international success and exhibited in Berlin, Munich, Washington D.C., and Philadelphia, among other places.

He married Adèle Anna Viktoria Björklund in 1881. He died in Stockholm in 1908.

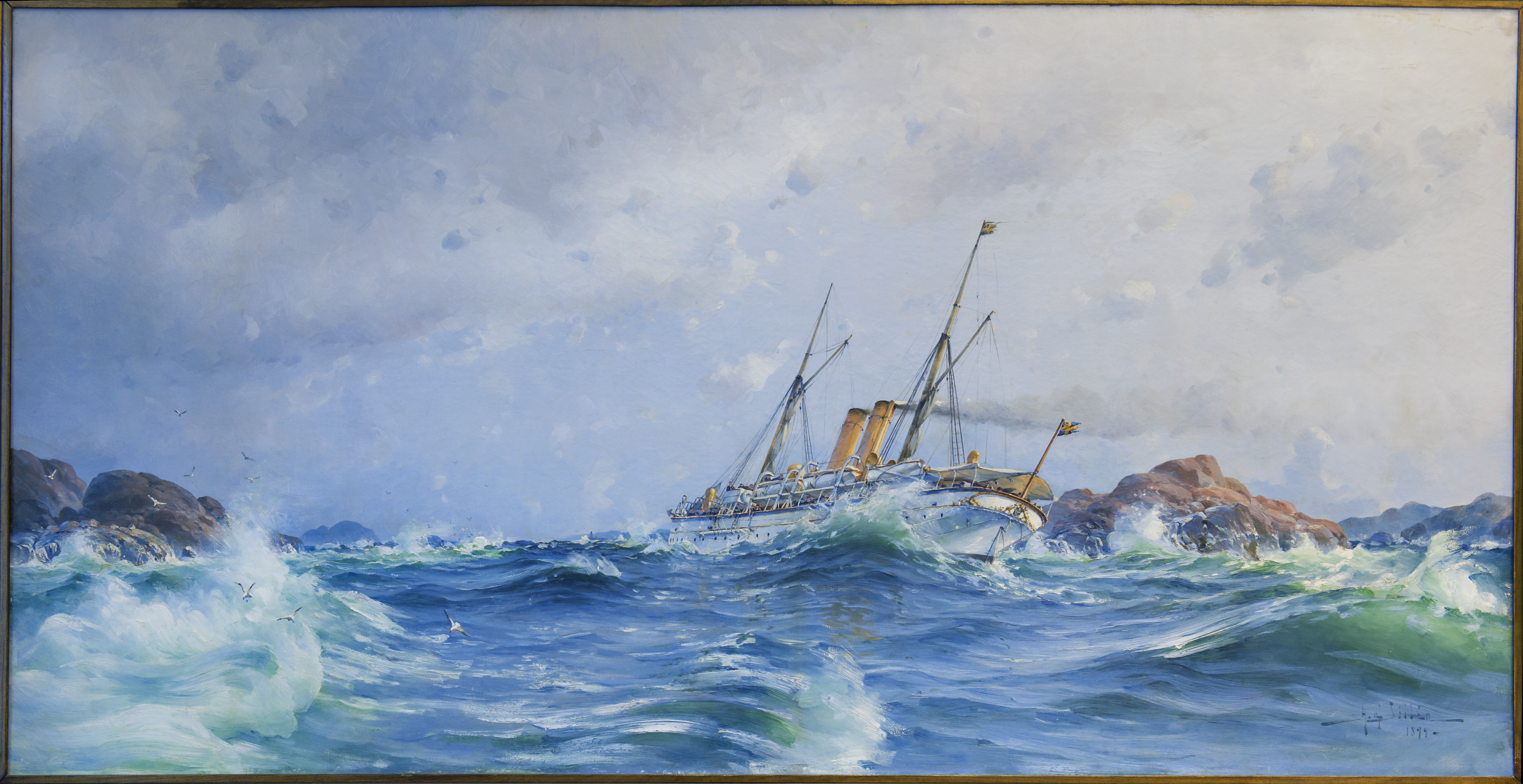
Drott in a storm on the west coast of Sweden, oil painting by Herman af Sillén (1899)

== Awards and commemoration ==
In 1894, he was awarded the medal Litteris et Artibus. A retrospective exhibition of his art was made in 1942 at the Maritime Museum in Stockholm.

== Sources cited ==
- Bohman, Nils; Dahl, Torsten, eds. (1946). Svenska män och kvinnor: biografisk uppslagsbok [Swedish men and women. Biographical dictionary] (in Swedish). Vol. 7. Stockholm: Bonnier. OCLC 4629338. SELIBR 53802.
