= HSwMS Thor (1841) =

Swedish navy paddle steamer

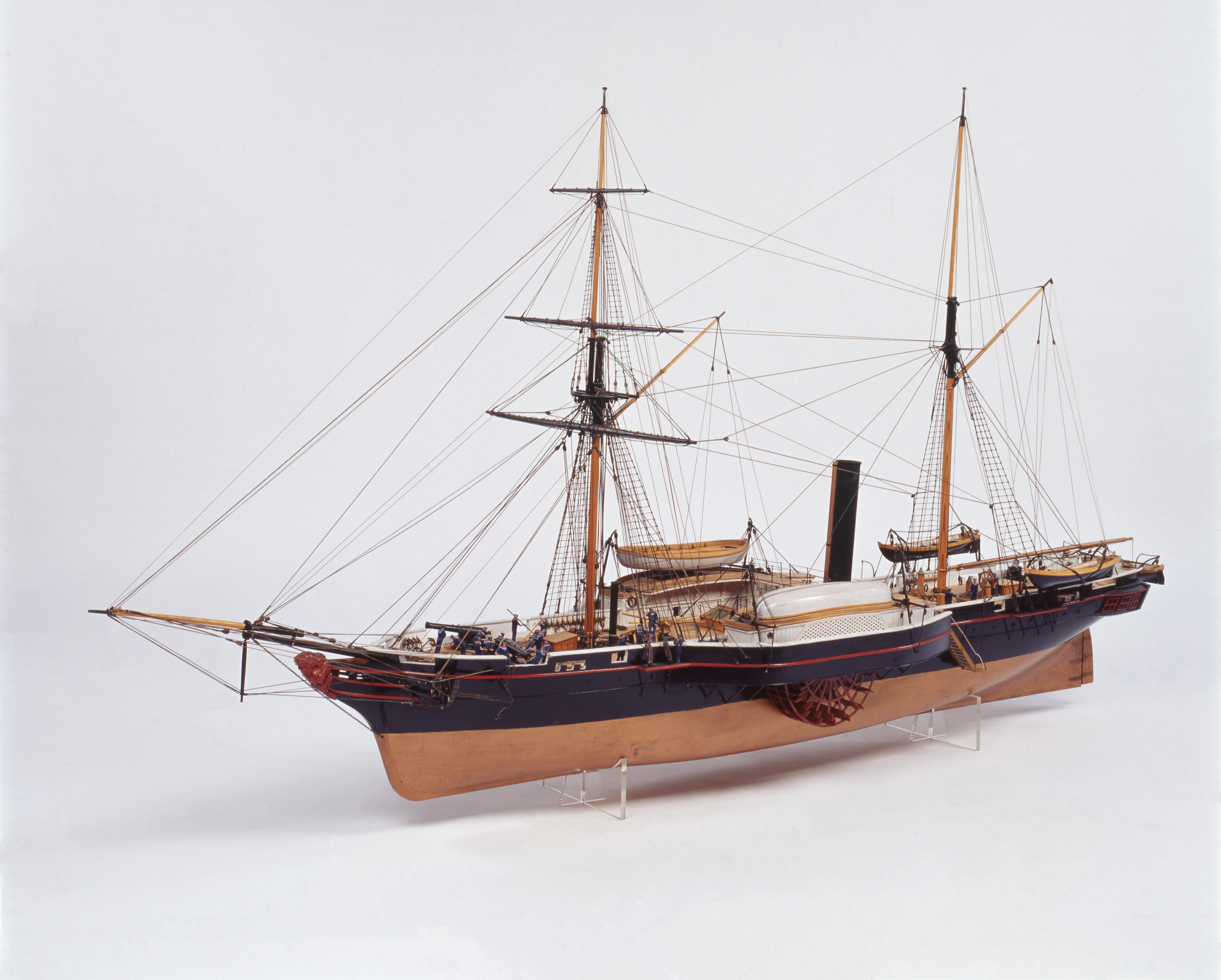
- Model of Thor in the Maritime Museum (Stockholm)

History

Sweden
- Name: Thor
- Builder: Karlskrona Yard
- Laid down: April 1839
- Launched: 12 May 1841
- Commissioned: 9 June 1841
- Decommissioned: 29 October 1887

General characteristics
- Displacement: 800 tons (as built)
- Length: 44.5 m (146.00 ft) (as built)
- Beam: 9.82 m (32.22 ft)
- Draft: 3.7 m (12.14 ft)
- Speed: 9.7 knots (17.96 km/h)
- Complement: 125 men
- Armament: As built: 2 × 155 mm guns; 2 × 226 mm Paixhans guns; 2 x 108 mm carronades

HSwMS Thor was a paddle steamer of the Swedish Navy. It was the only paddle steamer built for the Swedish Navy, and one of only two steamships built for the Swedish Navy during the mid-1800s intended for active combat duty. Thor was used to ship Swedish and Norwegian troops to Funen to support Denmark during the First Schleswig War (1848–1852), and was the flagship of a Swedish-Norwegian flotilla that patrolled Skagerrak and Kattegatt during the Second Schleswig War in 1864. Problems with the construction prompted a rebuilding in 1861–1862, and the armament of Thor was changed several times. From 1876 the hull was barely maintained and in 1887 Thor was formally decommissioned.

== History ==
HSwMS Thor was the only paddle steamer to have been built for the Swedish Navy, and entirely constructed of wood. She was laid down in April 1839 and formally commissioned in 1841. The ship was equipped with steam paddles but also with two masts, and could use sails, wherefore the ship somewhat erroneously was classified as a frigate. Thor was together with HSwMS Gefle the only steam-powered ships built during the mid-1800s for the Swedish Navy that were intended for active combat duty. Even though Sweden formally never entered the war, Thor was used to ship Swedish and Norwegian troops to Funen to support Denmark during the First Schleswig War (1848–1852), and to patrol Danish waters. During the Second Schleswig War in 1864, she was the flagship of a Swedish-Norwegian flotilla that patrolled Skagerrak and Kattegatt, commanded by the future king of Sweden, Oscar II. The experiences gained during the expedition served as important input to a programme of modernisation of the Swedish Navy launched after the coronation of Oscar as King of Sweden in 1872.

The construction of Thor made it a poor sailing ship. At the same time, the paddle wheels were exposed to enemy fire and scantily protected. They also limited the amount of cannons the ship could deploy, blocking much of the sides of the ship. In an attempt to improve its capabilities, the ship was rebuilt in 1861–1862 and enlarged to a total length of 50.06 m (164.24 ft). The armament was also changed at least twice. Due to the lavish interiors of the ship, Thor was used as a flagship towards the end of its service, but from 1876 the hull was barely maintained. Thor was finally decommissioned in 1887, and sold for scrapping the following year.
