= Jacob Hägg =

Swedish Navy officer and artist (1839–1931)

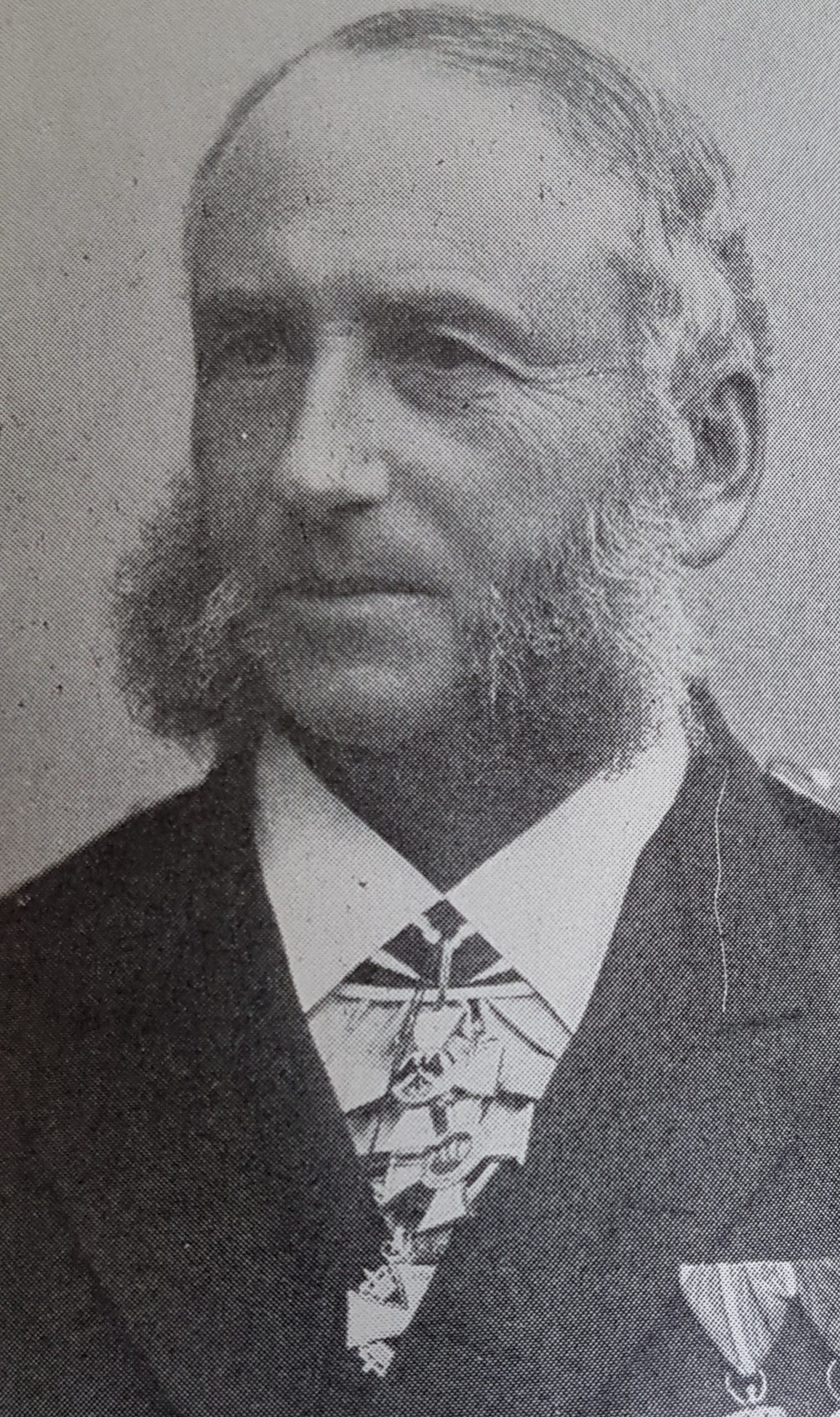
Jacob Hägg

Rear-Admiral Jacob Hägg (22 July 1839 – 15 April 1931) was a Swedish Navy officer and artist who specialised in marine art. He entered the Royal Swedish Naval Academy in 1858, and was commissioned as an officer in 1863. He sailed on several long journeys, including one circumnavigation of Earth. He entered the Fleet Staff in 1888, was appointed head of the Naval Academy in 1895 and promoted to rear admiral in 1899. In parallel to his military career, Hägg was also active as an artist. He made drawings and other graphic works, watercolours and oil paintings almost exclusively on marine subjects. He was also an active promoter of marine history and lobbied for the establishment of the Maritime Museum in Stockholm. His brother was the architect and artist Axel Haig.

== Background, childhood and family life ==
Jacob Hägg was born at Katthamra, a small manor house in Östergarn on the Swedish island Gotland. His father and grandfather had been engaged in shipping and the export of lime. His brother was the artist Axel Haig. He attended school in Visby, where his teacher was Pehr Arvid Säve.

He married Eleonora (Ellen) Magdalena Sofia Tellander in 1869.

== Military career ==
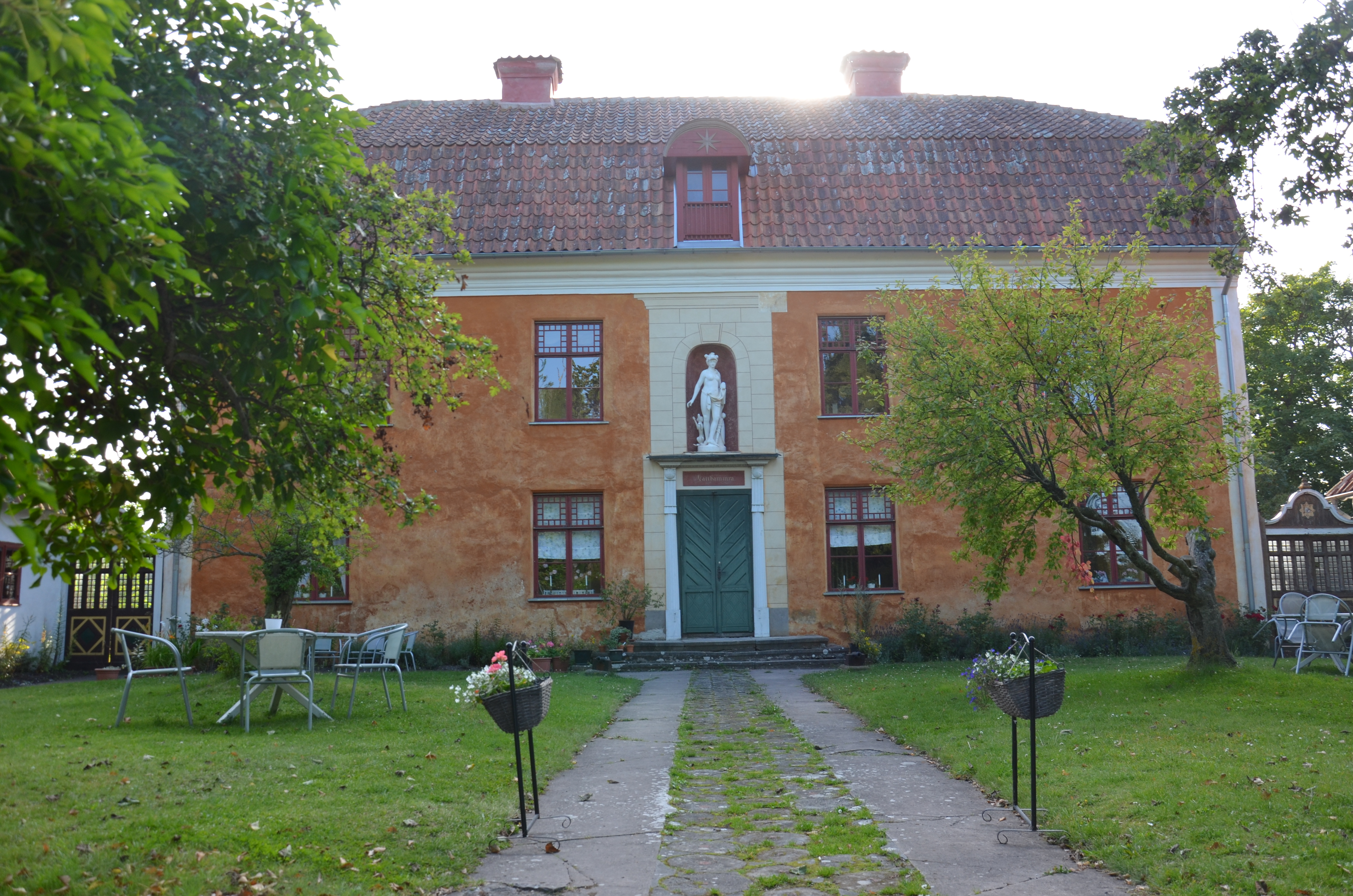
Katthamra, the birthplace of Hägg

Family tradition holds that Jacob Hägg decided to become a naval officer after seeing the French-British expeditionary force sail past Gotland on its way to the Battle of Bomarsund during the Crimean War in the summer of 1854. He was accepted as a cadet at Karlberg Palace in Stockholm in 1858, at the Naval Academy (later absorbed into the Military Academy). In 1863, he was commissioned as an officer in the Swedish Navy. During his military career he participated in several long journeys. In 1864–1865 he sailed with the steam corvette Gefle to the Mediterranean and the west coast of Africa; a travelogue from this journey was later published, to which Hägg contributed the illustrations. He also sailed with Gefle to Le Havre in 1870 to evacuate Swedish citizens after the outbreak of the Franco-Prussian War. He later also sailed on several long journeys, including one circumnavigation of Earth, with the steam frigate Vanadis (1862), which he was the commander of the years 1890–1894, and on the corvette Saga.

In 1888 he joined the Fleet Staff, where he proposed and planned secret shipping lanes to be used in times of war. In 1890, Hägg was made head of the Naval Academy (which included command of Vanadis) and in 1895 promoted to Kommendör and given the position of head of the naval yard in Stockholm. He was promoted to the rank of rear admiral in 1899 and in 1900 took up the position of head of the naval yard in Karlskrona, which he would retain until his retirement in 1904.

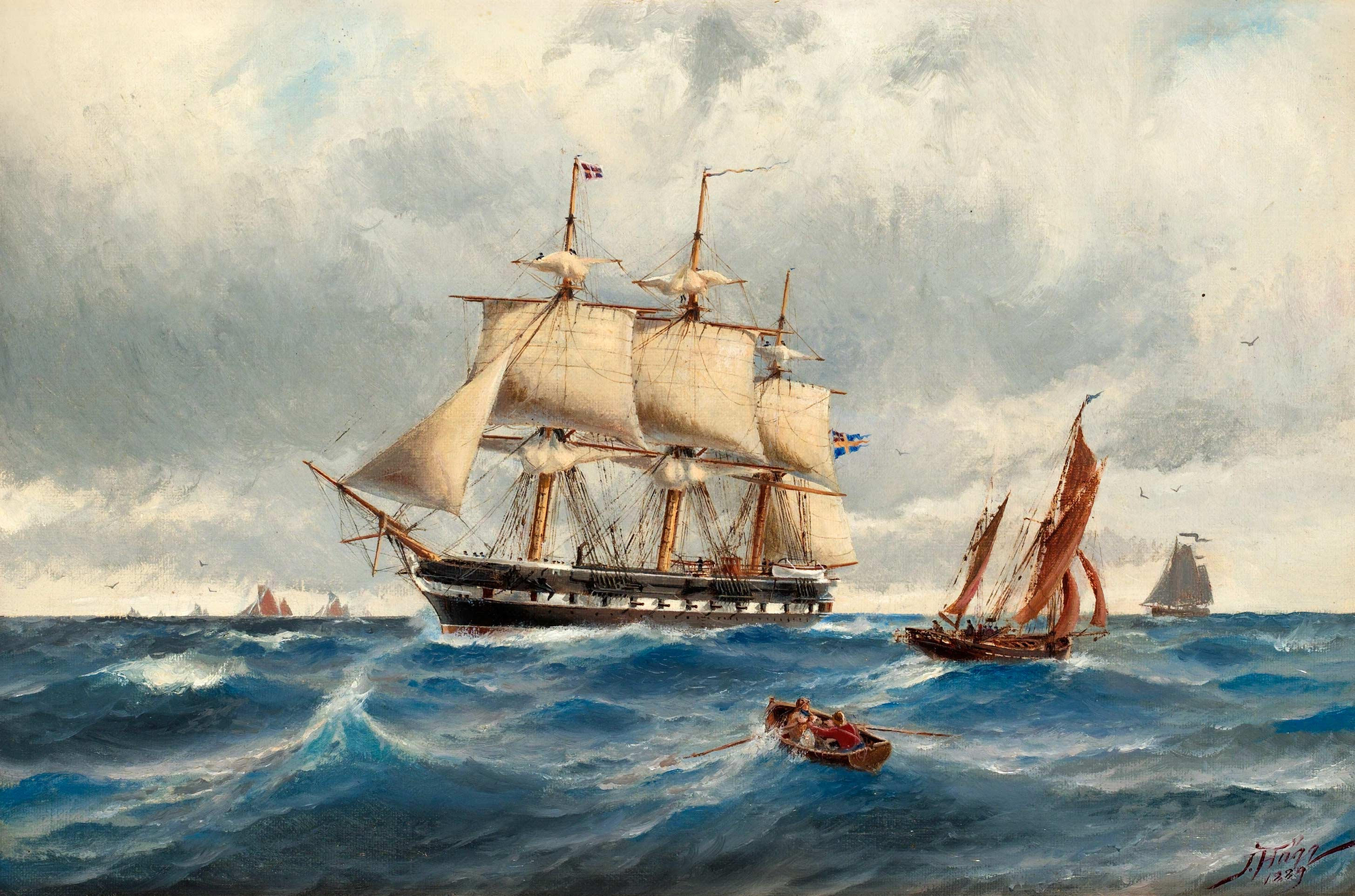
Oil painting by Hägg depicting the frigate Vanadis (1889); Hägg was commander of the ship 1890–1894 and circumnavigated the globe on board earlier in his career.

In January 1901 Hägg was involved in an episode which had political repercussions. Hägg was at that point accused, wrongfully as it turned out, to have broken a vow of silence regarding upcoming promotions of naval officers. As a consequence, he had to spend four days in jail. The story was covered by the press, and there was widespread shock that a high-ranking officer would be sent to jail for what many considered a minor offence. Public opinion tended to sympathise with Hägg. Eventually the episode reached the parliament, the Riksdag, where the naval minister Gerhard Dyrssen received strong criticism by prominent liberals, including future prime minister Karl Staaff. This led to the resignation of Dyrssen in May 1901. Hägg himself refrained from engaging in the debate, apart from a single attempt to downplay the incident in an article in Post- och Inrikes Tidningar.

== Artistic career ==
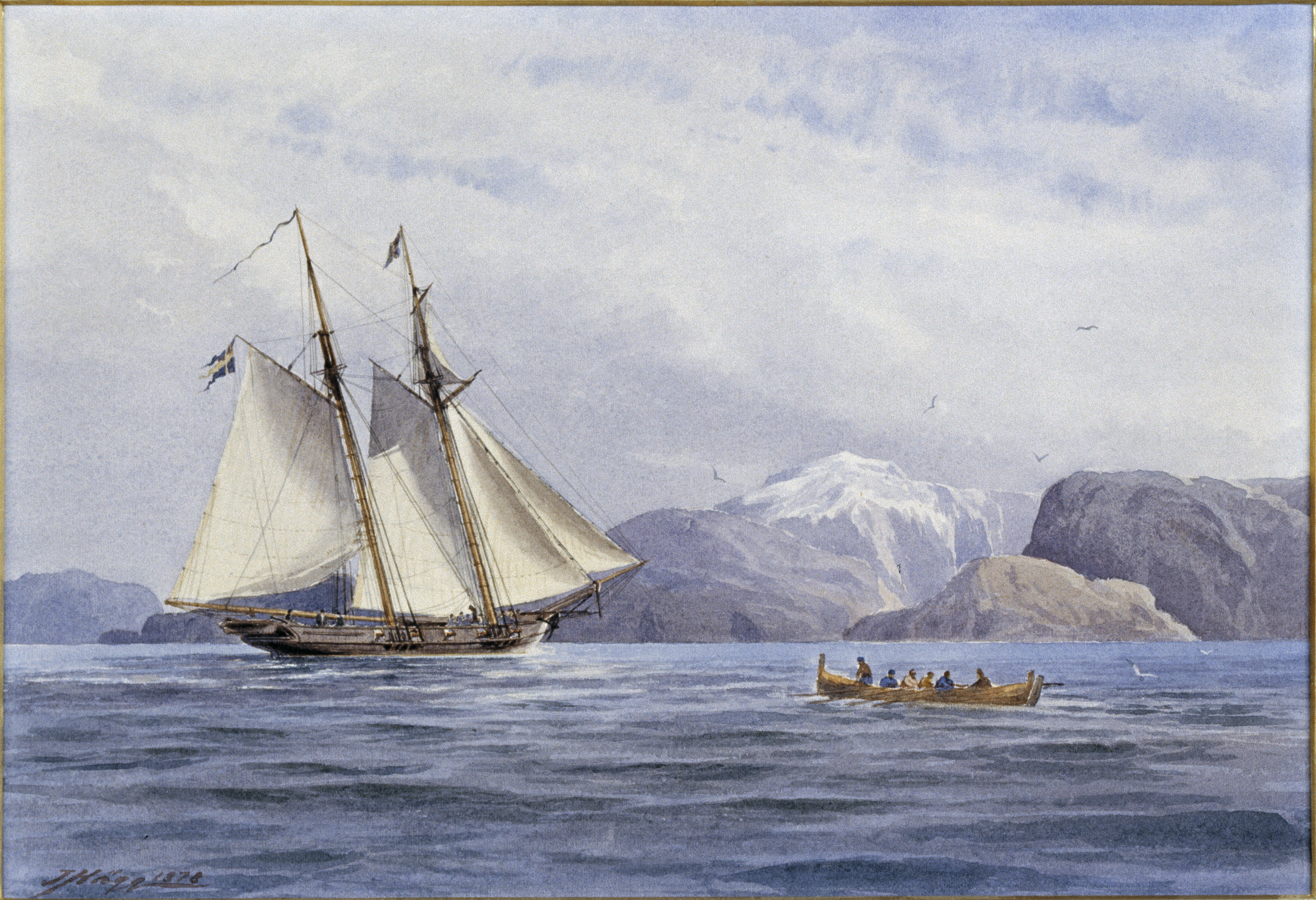
Watercolour painting of the Swedish ship L'Aigle (1833) on the Norwegian coast, dated 1878. Early in his career, Hägg worked mainly with watercolours and drawings.

In parallel to his military career, Jacob Hägg was also active as a marine artist. He was largely self-taught; apart from being taught basic drawing in school by Pehr Arvid Säve and later attending a course in oil painting by Per Daniel Holm, he had no formal education in the arts. He took up drawing and painting watercolours while a cadet, partly as a hobby and partly as a way of earning some extra money. He continued to pursue painting also as a means to provide him with extra income; still as a senior officer his salary was insufficient to provide him and his family with the kind of lifestyle he was socially expected to have as a military officer. In a letter to his mother as late as 1874 he notes that he hopes that his new oil painting will bring in some extra money.

Initially he painted only in watercolour in addition to making drawings and graphic works, but from the 1870s he began painting in oil. Initially he had trouble finding a studio he could use, and while serving as commander of Vanadis in the 1890s, he used the great cabin as an atelier for his oil painting.

As for subject matter, Hägg almost exclusively depicted ships and marine subjects in his works. Most or his paintings depict contemporary or historic ships, or sea battles. Apart from around 800 watercolour and oil paintings, and more than double the amount of graphic works, he also produced illustrations for naval textbooks, silhouettes of coastal segments for the use of pilots and illustrations for books, including for a 14-volume work on historical Swedish naval officers by Arnold Munthe.

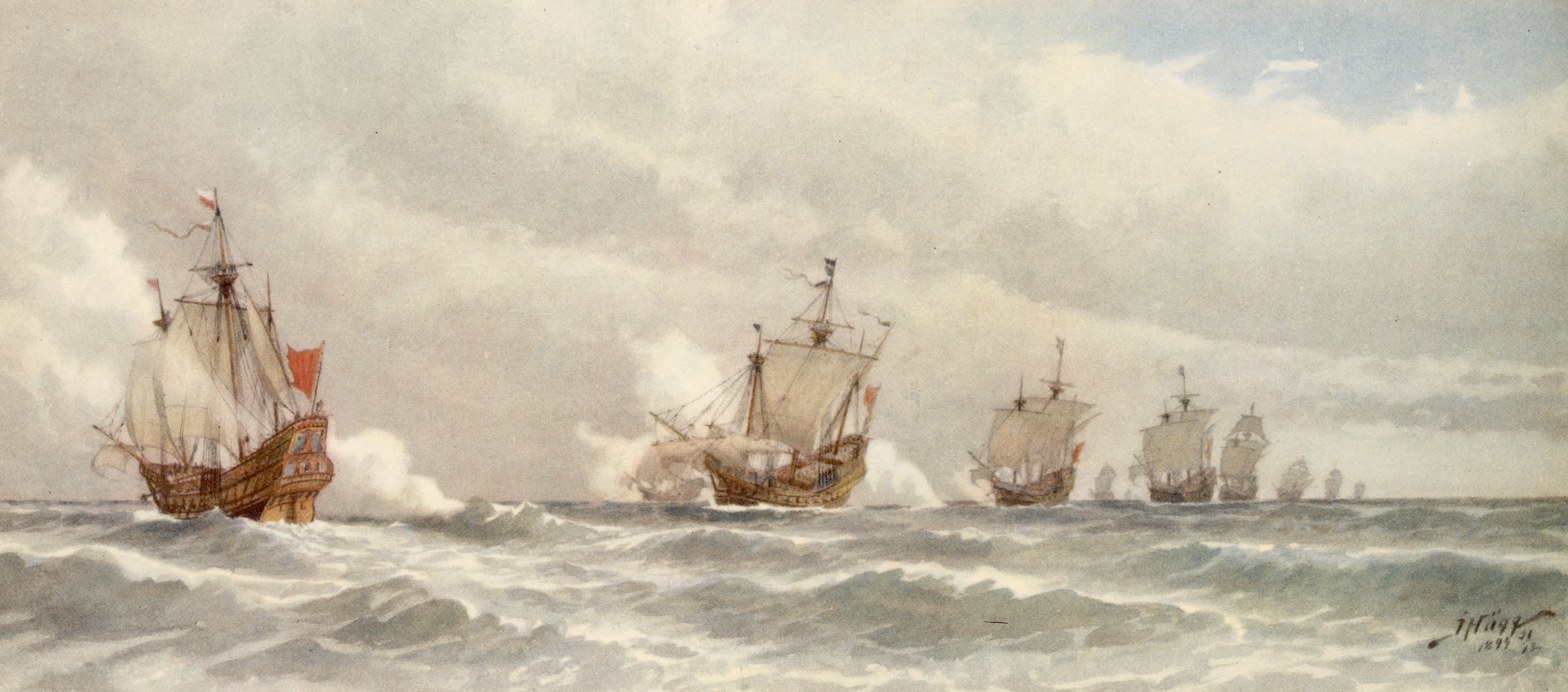
The Battle of Bornholm (1535) (1894). Hägg depicted both contemporary and historical ships, and naval battles.

Stylistically, he can be counted among the juste milieu painters; the ambience or atmosphere is often romantically portrayed, while his great technical skill and nautical knowledge contributes to a high degree of realism in the depiction of ships and other subject matter. When he came to Stockholm as a young man, he found inspiration among the collections of Nationalmuseum; in particular the art of Johan Fredrik Höckert influenced him. He is occasionally compared, often somewhat unfavourably, to his slightly younger contemporary colleague, Herman af Sillén.

Apart from being active as a painter, Jacob Hägg was also engaged in marine history and marine archaeology. At his initiative, the collection of historic model ships owned by the Swedish Navy was restored and exhibited to the public. The first time was at the General Art and Industrial Exposition of Stockholm in 1897, but following this no suitable arrangement could be found to permanently display them. Hägg therefore started promoting the idea of a maritime museum in Stockholm. Shortly before his death in 1931 he learnt that funding for such a museum had finally been secured from Knut Agathon Wallenberg, and the Maritime Museum opened in 1938 in Stockholm. Vexillology was also another field in which Hägg was engaged; he published pamphlets and articles on subjects related to the national flag, and participated in the work leading to a new national flag law of 1906.

== Dates of rank ==
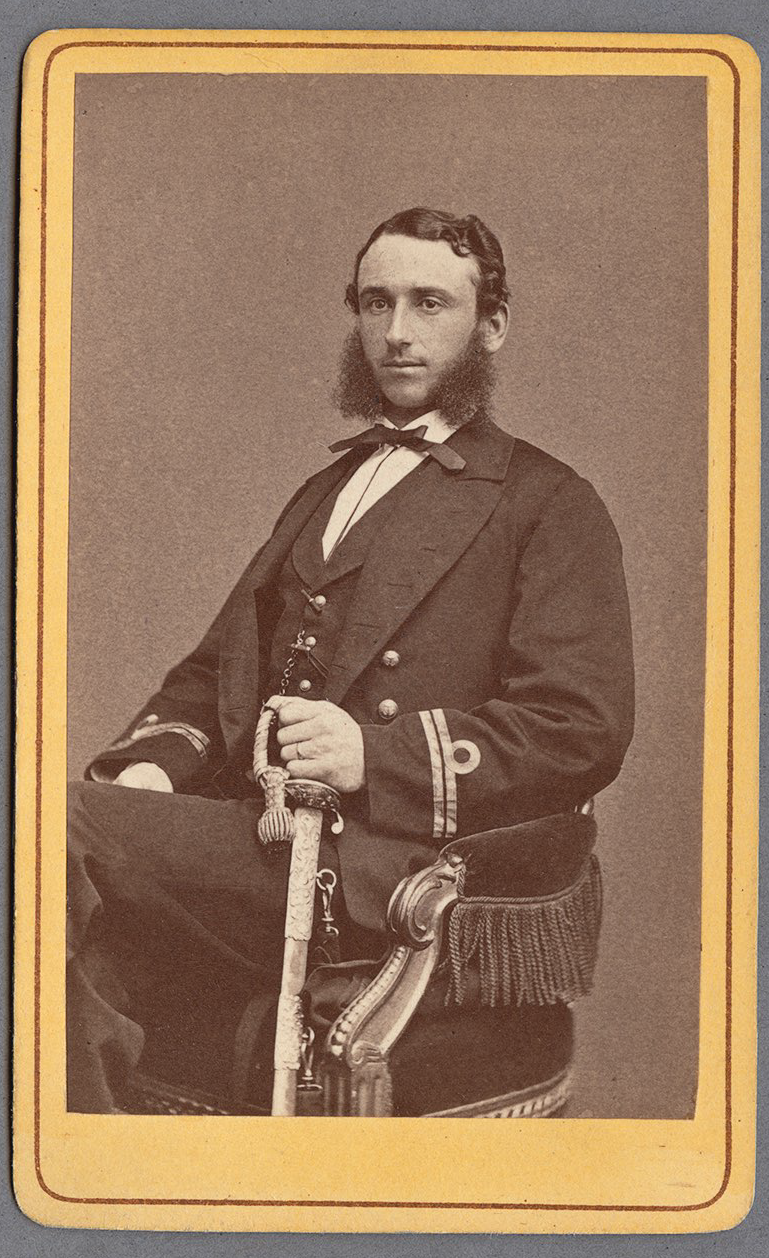
Photo of Hägg as a young officer

- 24 March 1863 – Sekundlöjtnant
- 25 September 1866 – Sub-lieutenant
- 12 September 1879 – Lieutenant
- 5 April 1889 – Lieutenant commander
- 22 January 1892 – Commander
- 31 May 1895 – Captain
- 24 March 1899 – Rear admiral

== Honours and commemoration ==
In 1927 Hägg was awarded the medal Illis quorum. The Swedish Maritime Administration operates a hydrographic survey vessel named R/V Jacob Hägg. He was furthermore a member of the Royal Swedish Society of Naval Sciences (1891), of the Royal Swedish Academy of War Sciences (1892) and from 1899 Honorary member of the Royal Swedish Society of Naval Sciences.

== Sources cited ==
- Bohman, Nils; Dahl, Torsten, eds. (1946). Svenska män och kvinnor: biografisk uppslagsbok [Swedish men and women. Biographical dictionary] (in Swedish). Vol. 3 G-H. Stockholm: Bonnier. OCLC 4629338. SELIBR 53802.
- Gavel, Jonas (1971–1973). "Jacob (Jacques) Hägg". Svenskt biografiskt lexikon (in Swedish). Vol. 19. National Archives of Sweden.
- Soop, Hans (1981). "Jacob Hägg: målande amiral" [Jacob Hägg, painting admiral]. Longitude (in Swedish). 17: 16–27. ISSN 0024-6328. SELIBR 11479112.
