= HSwMS Gefle =

Swedish Navy corvette

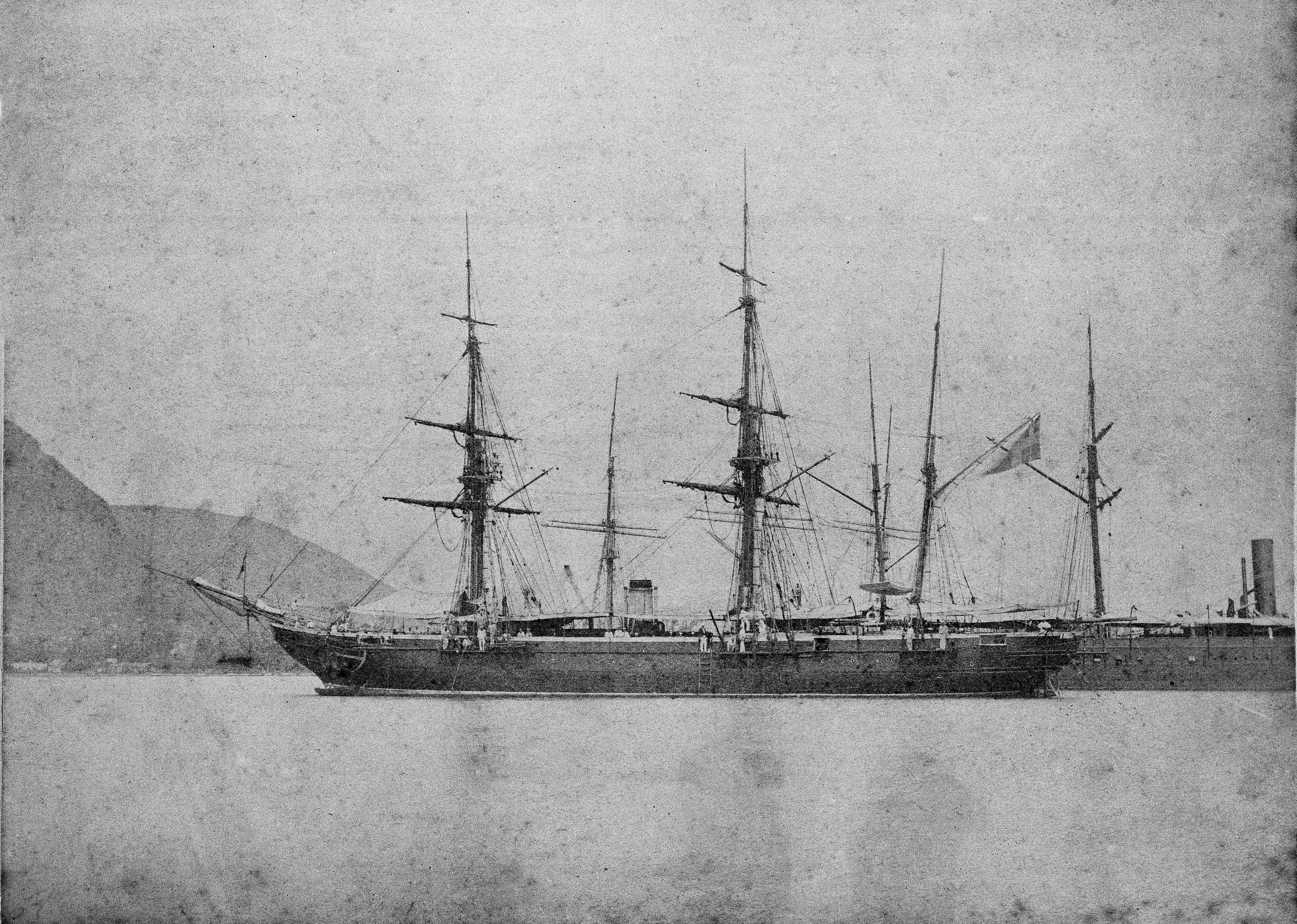
- Gefle, photo 1878 in Montevideo

History

Sweden
- Name: Gefle
- Builder: Karlskrona Yard
- Launched: 1 December 1847
- Commissioned: 1848
- Out of service: 21 February 1890

General characteristics
- Displacement: 1278 tons
- Length: 52.5 m (172.24 ft)
- Beam: 9.8 m (32.15 ft)
- Draft: 5.1 m (16.73 ft)
- Speed: 9 knots (16.67 km/h) (with engine)
- Complement: 169 men
- Armament: As built: 2 × 226 mm canon-obusiers; 4 × 155 mm guns; 2 x 108 mm carronades; After 1863: 6 × 155 mm guns; After 1874: 1 × 226 mm canon-obusier; 1 × 155 mm gun; 6 × 122 mm guns; After 1875: 2 × 155 mm guns; 6 × 122 mm guns

HSwMS Gefle was a steam corvette of the Swedish Navy. She was one of the earliest steam-powered ships of the Swedish Navy, and the first equipped with a propeller. During her service years, Gefle was used on several long expeditions, including to the Mediterranean, West Africa and South America. In 1870, Gefle was dispatched to Le Havre to evacuate Swedish citizens after the outbreak of the Franco-Prussian War. Admiral and marine artist Jacob Hägg served onboard Gefle early in his career. Gefle was removed from active service in 1890 and shortly thereafter broken up.

== Construction ==
The parliament of Sweden, the Riksdag, decided during its session 1844–1845 to provide funding for a steam-powered, wooden naval ship equipped with a propeller designed by John Ericsson. The resulting ship, HSwMS Gefle, was launched in 1847 and thus became one of the earliest warships of Sweden powered by a steam engine. Another steam-powered corvette, HSwMS Thor, predated Gefle by a few years, but was equipped with paddle wheels. Gefle was also the first ship of the Swedish Navy equipped with a propeller, and one of the first naval ships in the world with a screw propeller. The ship nonetheless still used sails as its main force of propulsion, and was rigged as a barque.

== Service history ==
Gefle was named after the Swedish city Gävle. She was sent on several long expeditions abroad during the years 1863–1881. For example, Gefle journey to the Mediterranean Sea and West Africa in 1864–1865, and again to the Mediterranean in 1867–1868. In 1877–1878 she sailed to South America. During the 1864–1865 expedition, future admiral and marine artist Jacob Hägg served onboard, and later illustrated a travelogue from the trip. In 1870, Gefle was dispatched to Le Havre to evacuate Swedish citizens after the outbreak of the Franco-Prussian War.

During the service years of Gefle the technological development was rapid, and her armament was updated several times. By 1882, her engine was removed and the following year her armament dismantled entirely. From then on, Gefle served mainly as a training ship and saw very little sailing. She was removed from active duty in 1890 and shortly thereafter broken up.
