= Medieval Scandinavian architecture =

Architectural style of Northern Europe

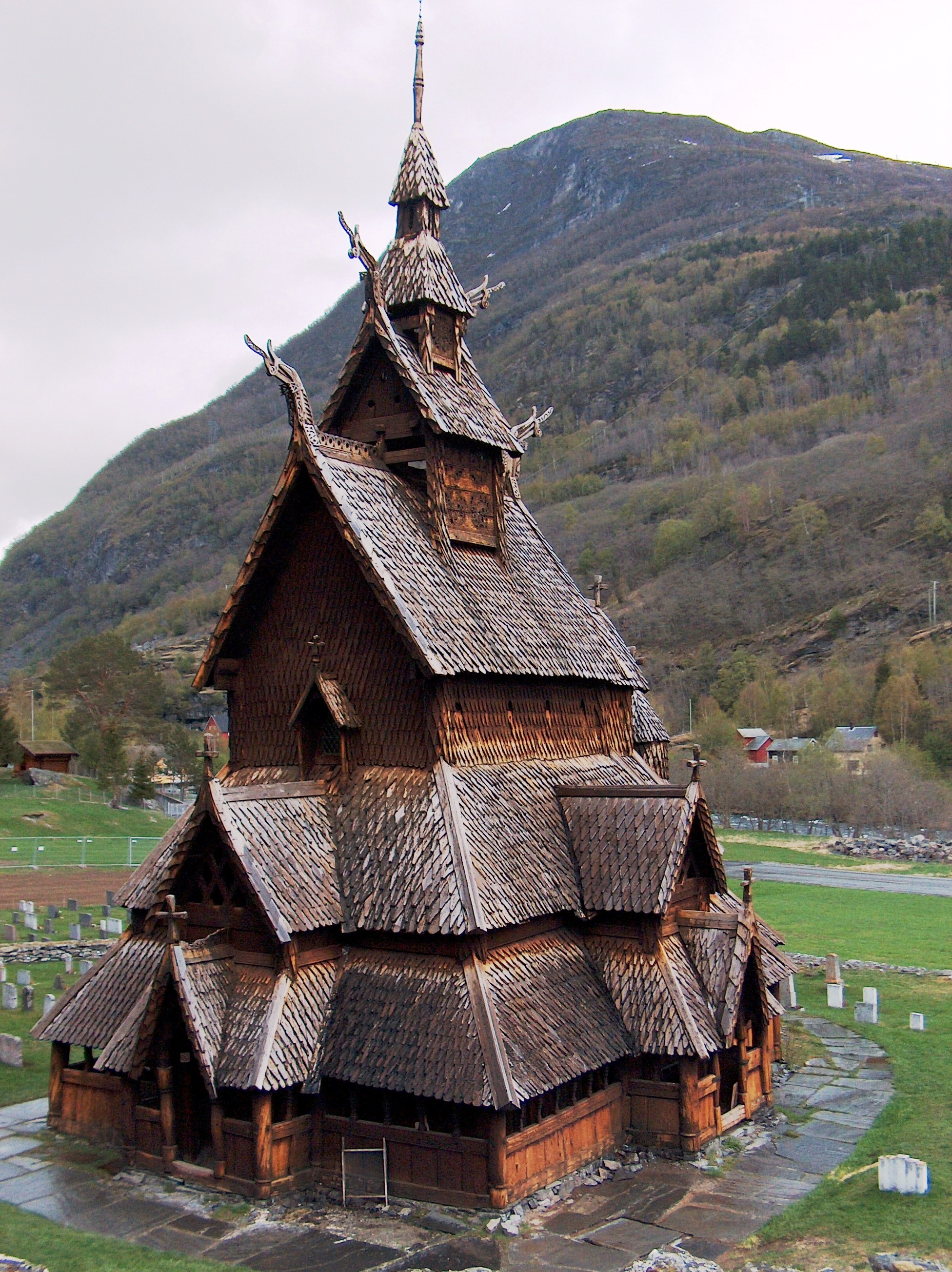
Borgund stave church, in Borgund, Lærdal, Norway, built in the 12th century

The major aspects of Medieval Scandinavian architecture are boathouses, religious buildings (before and after Christians arrived in the area), and general buildings (both in cities and outside of them).

== Boating houses ==
Boating houses, known in Scandinavian culture as "Nausts", are the buildings used to hold Viking Ships during the winter and any time they could not sail. They were usually built a few meters back from the waterline making it easy to move to ships to and from the water. Ruts were dug into the ground to accommodate the keel of the boat to make transportation easier. The roof rafters came all the way to the ground in a curved shape that creates a self-supporting structure. While most structures were created in this upside-down boat-looking shape, there were various shapes and styles of boating houses depending on the area and size of the boat being housed. The walls were made of wood with stones piled up underneath and for the foundation. Occasionally vertical beams were built along the inside of the building to add additional support. Due to the size of the boats (approx. 25–30 m long, 15 m wide, and 5 m high) the boathouses had to be large enough to accommodate the ships. During the summer seasons when the boating houses were no longer in use, Vikings used these structures for feasts and even royal festivals on occasion. Furthermore, the ship and its naust could be used to present the social standing of owner. Each held one ship only, but many boathouses could be built beside one another if multiple ships needed to be housed.

== Military buildings ==
=== Viking ring fortress ===
There are five main and well-known ring fortresses in Denmark; they have been dated to the reign of Harald "Bluetooth" of Denmark (died 986 CE). The fortresses are Trelleborg, Aggersborg, Fyrkat, Nonnebakken, and Borgring. Of these five, Trelleborg has been the best preserved and is unique as it contains a fortified ward. The fortresses made use of their surrounding geography to enhance defensive strength. The true nature and purpose of these buildings are not well understood as there was a lack of documentation surrounding the buildings. The most commonly accepted theory is that these fortresses were built by Bluetooth to not only show his strength and sovereign power but as an attempt to combine and establish a proper and unified kingdom under his rule. The complexity and size of the structures show that there had to be an extreme centralized power to establish them and keep them functioning. However, due to the turmoil of the time period with various power struggles, these structures were most likely very difficult to maintain, leading to them falling into disuse within a mere decade.

The structures themselves are built in a specific geometric way to ensure defensive power and strength. Each fortress was built in a precise circular shape hence "ring fortress". There were four main gates located equidistant from each other with ramps located with each gate connected by roads. There is a main circle road that connects with these axial roads. Within the fortress is a number of longhouses that are arranged to complement the geometric structure of the ring fortress. Outer ramparts were created from wood and dirt, and the largest of these fortresses was Aggersborg.

== Religious buildings ==
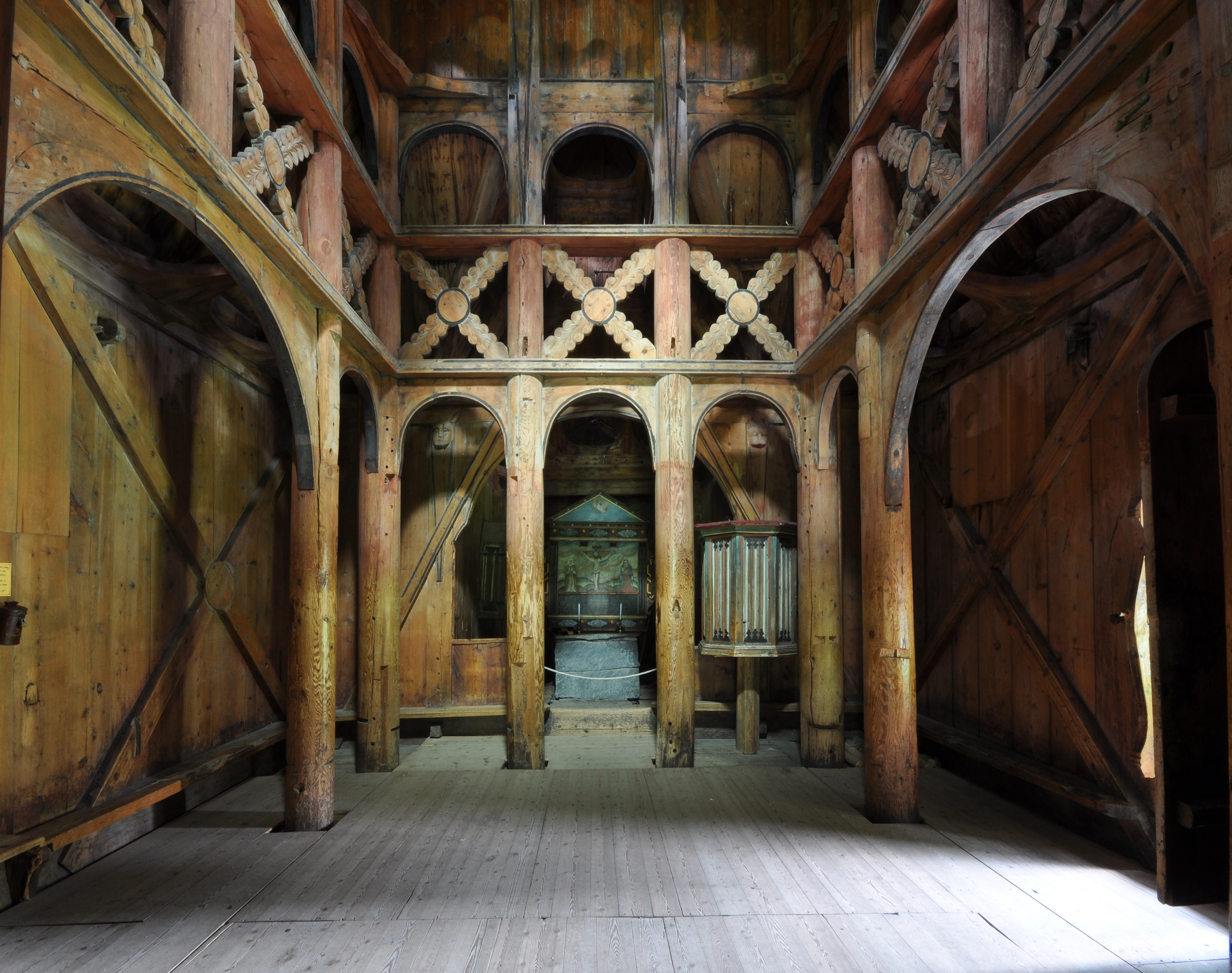
interior of Borgun stave church

=== Ritual houses ===
Before Christianity made its way to the Vikings and Scandinavia, it was a primarily pagan community. This required ritual houses which were not only religious buildings, but in earlier times were also used as a way to display the weapons of defeated enemies, showing the strength of the warriors and community. The architecture of the early structures was fairly simple and similar to other structures of the community. As time progressed the design became much more like that of a church with staggered and multi-layer roofs. The entrance to the ritual houses had ornamental designs. Rituals were completed outside the structure as it often involved burning and sacrifice of animals; due to this, the Vikings developed the outside of the houses to be ornamental rather than focusing on interior decoration.

=== Stave churches ===
Stave churches were used for Christian gatherings in the Norse region after the Christianization of Scandinavia. The roofs were often multi-layered, and they usually had a tower or spire in the middle of the highest layer of the roof. They were built of wood, and had stone walls around the base. The design for the stave churches most likely developed from ritual houses. But the inside was highly decorated with intricate designs. Most of these designs depict Jesus, a cross, or the disciples.

One of the most popular stave churches as recognized by UNESCO is the Urnes Stave Church, located in Sognefjord, Norway, which is still in use today. The space utilizes Romanesque styles in wooden form rather than the common stone material. It contains semi-circular columns and curved arches. The strap-work paneling showcases Viking tradition along with the carvings in the walls displaying fighting animals. The decorations are an essential connection between the pre-Christian Nordic traditions and the later Christianity of the Middle Ages as well as representing the artistic style of Scandinavian culture.

== General buildings ==
=== Countryside ===
These buildings were built of wood, usually logs similar to “Lincoln Logs" or log - cabin style. The roofs were covered in soil to keep the heat inside the house, and grass was planted in the soil on the roof to keep it from eroding away. These buildings were for farming the rough steep fjords. The buildings for farms were split into two parts, Innhus and Uthus. The Innhus was for food storage, sleeping and living. The Uthus were the buildings for animals, tools and animal fodder (animal food), in other words, the Uthus were the barns and silos.

=== Viking longhouse ===
Throughout the Norse lands, people lived in longhouses (langhús), which were typically 5 to 7 meters (16 to 23 ft) wide and anywhere from 15 to 75 meters (49 to 246 ft) long, depending on the wealth and social position of the owner. In much of the Norse region, the longhouses were built around wooden frames on simple stone footings. Walls were constructed of planks, of logs, or of wattle and daub. The walls were curved inwards to create a boat-like shape similar to the boating houses. The walls were covered with clay and vertical poles lined the inside to help create support. Multiple internal posts were built for further support. The roofs were thatched or slanted. Within the house there was a fireplace and flat beds along the wall for sitting or sleeping. If the owner did not have stables, the animals were housed in stalls at the end of the longhouse.

Hospitality was an important tradition for Vikings and travelers could be put up in longhouses. Banquets were held frequently to celebrate various festivals, as well as weddings and funerals. Specific banquets were held to teach proper etiquette as well as promoting hospitality and how a host should act towards their guests.

=== Icelandic turf houses ===
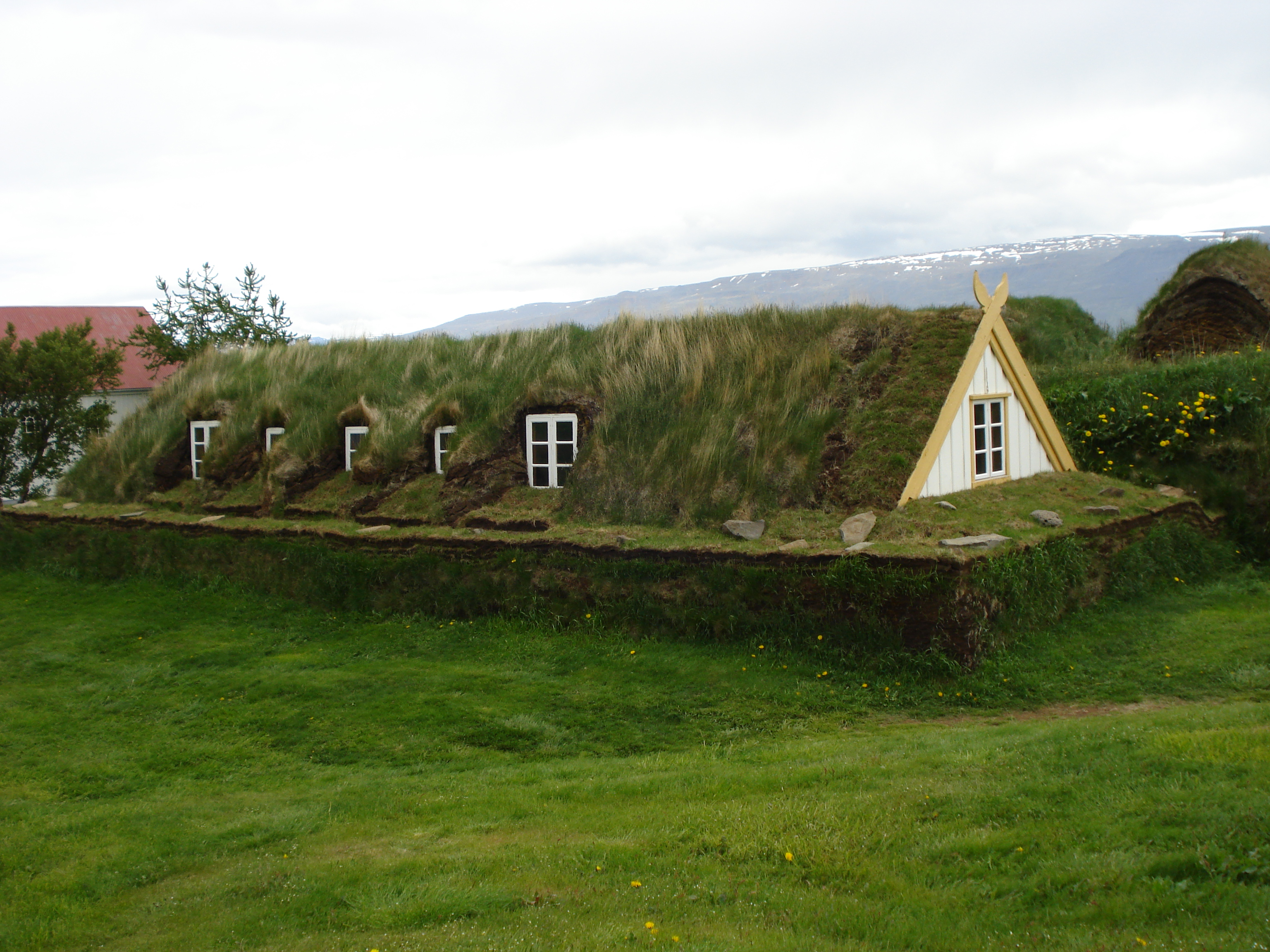
Turf roof of a house in Glaumbær, Iceland

The common Icelandic turf house would have a large foundation made of flat stones; upon this was built a wooden frame which would hold the load of the turf. The turf would then be fitted around the frame in blocks often with a second layer, or in the more fashionable herringbone style. The doorway was place on the longitudinal side of the home and was the only entrance. The only external wood would be the doorway which would often be decorative; the doorway would lead into the hall which would commonly have a great fire. Another interesting aspect of the Icelandic turf house was the introduction of attached toilets, which were communal, and the act of going to the attached toilet was often done in large groups. The floor of a turf house could be covered with wood, stone or earth depending on the purpose of the building. They also had a fireplace that would be in the center of the house heating and lighting the whole house. Over time, the turf houses changed in size which directly related to their purpose and status of the owner. The turf house tradition was brought over by to Iceland by Nordic settlers where it originated from Northern Europe. Few settlers still know the practice of building turf to date and the true origins of the development of the turf building practice have been lost to time.

=== Oslo ===
Until 1624, Oslo was like any other Norse town (many wooden buildings together used for varying purposes), but in 1624, a fire burned down all of Oslo. Because of the fires, the King Christian IV moved Oslo west and ordered that all buildings in the city be built of stone or brick to prevent fires. Also to prevent fires, the streets were wide and met at right angles. After a time, the King allowed the people to “build half-timbered structures," which has the timber frame visible on both the inside and the outside of the building.

== See also ==
- Heathen hofs
