= Axel Haig =

Artist, illustrator and architect (1835–1921)

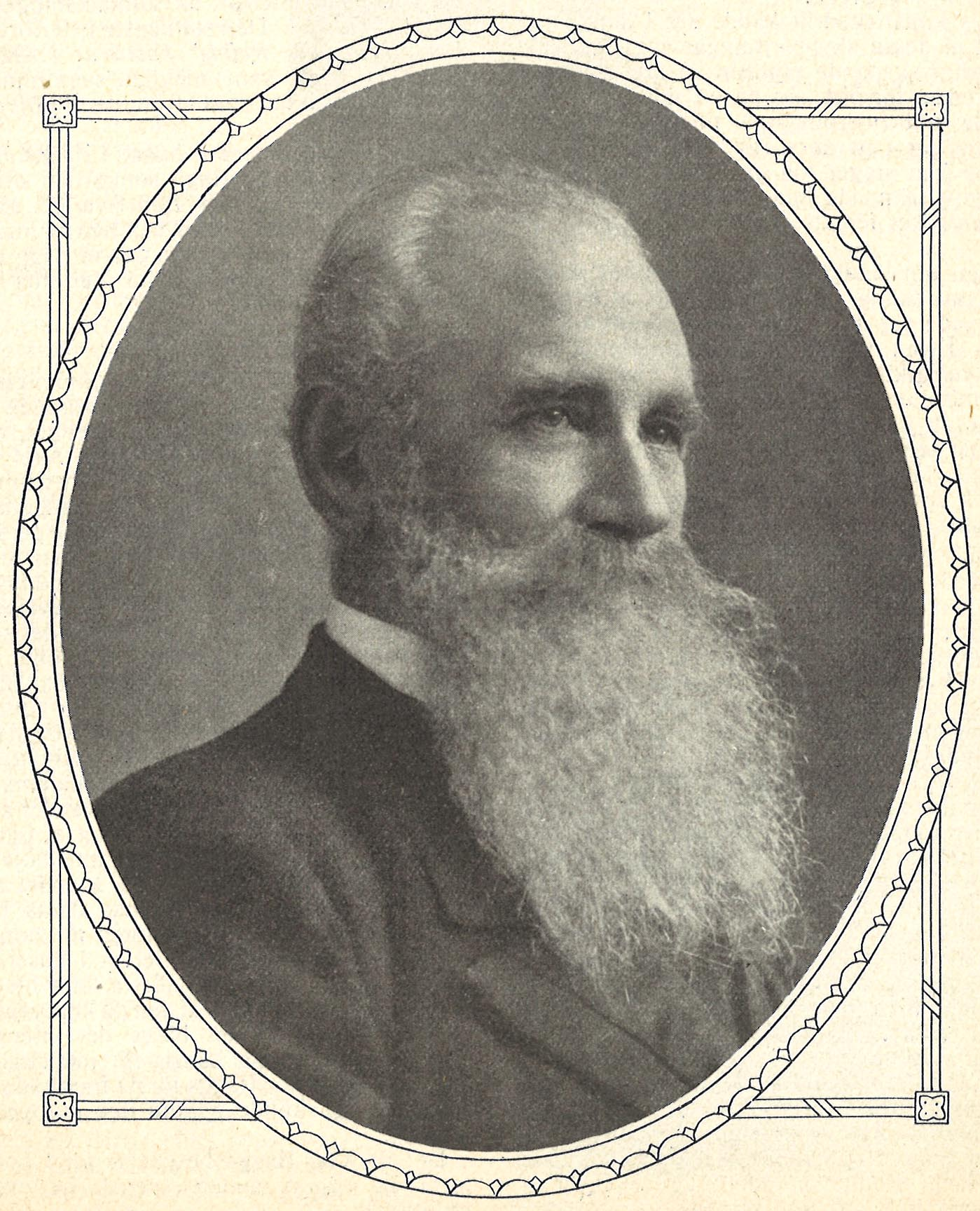
- Born: Axel Herman Hägg; 10 November 1835; Gotland, Sweden
- Died: 23 August 1921 (aged 85); Grayswood, Surrey, England
- Known for: Art (drawing, etching), architecture
- Movement: Gothic Revival

Axel Herman Haig RE (Swedish: Axel Herman Hägg; 10 November 1835 –23 August 1921) was a Swedish-born artist, illustrator and architect. His paintings, illustrations and etchings, undertaken for himself and on behalf of many of the foremost architects of the Victorian period made him "the Piranesi of the Gothic Revival."

== Life ==
Haig was born at Katthamra farm in the parish of Östergarn on the island of Gotland. His parents were Axel Hägg, a landowner and timber merchant, and Anna Margaretha Lindström. He was taught drawing and watercolor painting by Per Arvid Säve (1811–1887), who ran a private drawing school at Visby. Haig was apprenticed as a shipbuilder at the government dockyard at Karlskrona. In 1856 he went to Glasgow for a further period of training at a firm of Clydeside shipbuilders. But his interests had turned to architecture and in 1859, he undertook a new apprenticeship as a draughtsman in the offices of the Ecclesiastical Commissioners. After seven years there, he launched himself as an architectural artist.

The middle years of the nineteenth century saw an explosion in the practice of architectural competitions. The wealth generated by the empire and the Industrial Revolution created the necessary conditions for a vast expansion in civic construction. Commissions for government offices, town halls, churches for private benefactors, railway termini were all put out to tender and competing architects required draughtsmen to illustrate their plans. In 1866 Haig met architect and designer William Burges (1827–1881) when Burges retained him to illustrate his designs for the Royal Courts of Justice in The Strand. Haig produced a series of watercolour illustrations that were "an immediate sensation." The competition's winner, George Edmund Street, is said to have remarked, "I wouldn't mind being beaten by drawings like those."

In 1875, Haig made study trips to Italy and Sicily, which resulted in a multitude of drawings and watercolors of mainly medieval architecture. Haig and Burges continued in partnership until the latter's death in 1881. In that time they produced some of the most spectacular medieval visions of the Victorian Gothic Revival. Cardiff Castle, Knightshayes Court, the Church of Christ the Consoler at Skelton-on-Ure, St Mary's Church, Park House, the Speech Room, Harrow School, Castell Coch, Trinity College, Hartford, Connecticut and the designs for the re-decoration of Saint Paul's Cathedral: as Burges designed his most important commissions, so Haig drew them. "In Haig, Burges, the architect of a medieval dreamland, had found an artist worthy of his dreams."

Haig developed a second career as an etcher and his drawings and lithographs of European castles, palaces, landscapes and cathedrals became hugely popular in late-Victorian England. He was elected as a member of the Royal Society of Painter-Etchers.

Haig was mostly a resident of England, but spent the summers at the family farm on Gotland. Floda Church at Södermanland, Sweden, was rebuilt and underwent restoration between 1885 and 1888 on the basis of his drawings.

Haig also designed All Saints' Church, Grayswood, Surrey. It was built between 1901 and 1902 in a style described variously as Surrey Vernacular or "13th-century [Gothic] with Arts and Crafts elements". Haig is buried in the graveyard. The church is a Grade II listed building.

In a review of Haig's work published by the Royal Institute of British Architects in the year of his death, Maurice Adams wrote that "his architectural draughtsmanship ranks without a doubt amongst the foremost of his time and his graphic capability remains unique."

== Gallery ==
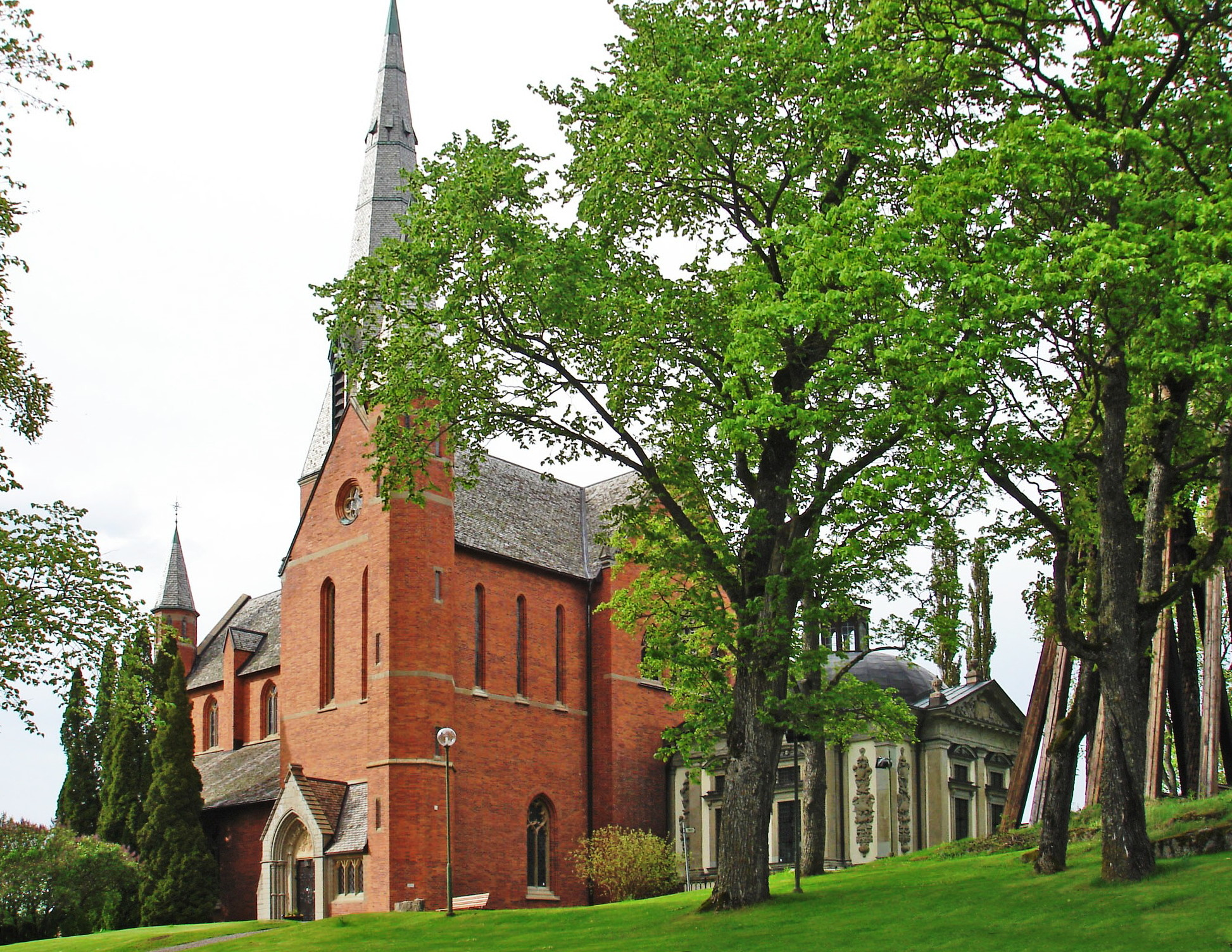
Floda Church in Södermanland

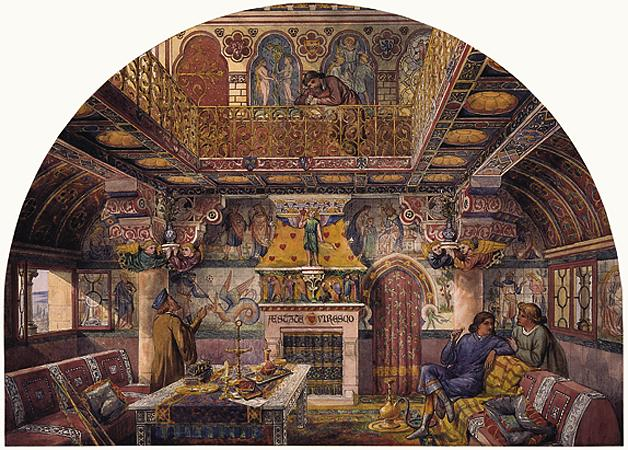
Haig's illustration for the Summer Smoking Room at Cardiff Castle

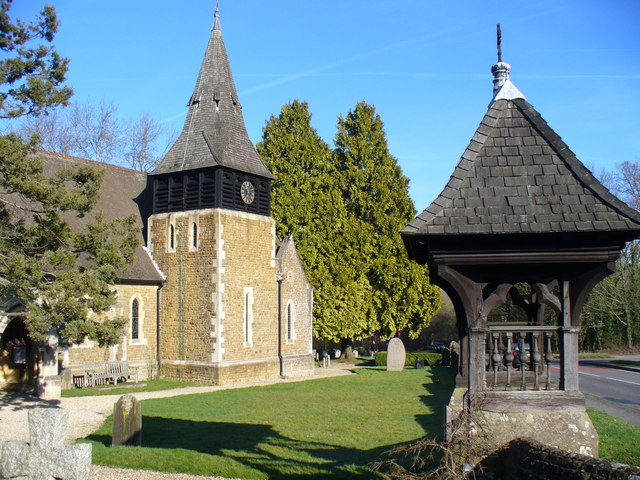
All Saints Church designed by Haig in his adopted village of Grayswood

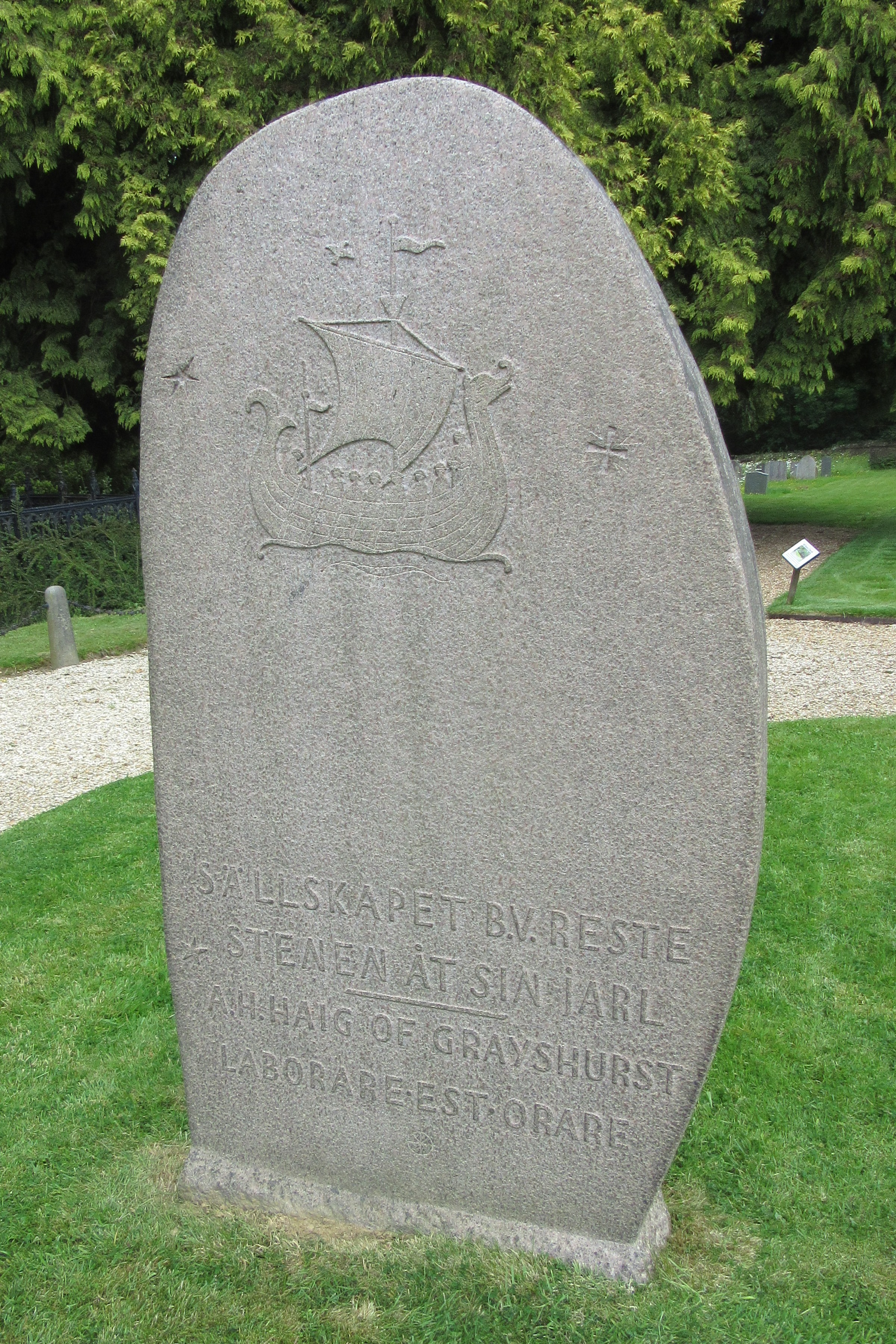
Haig's headstone

== Sources ==
- Armstrong, E.A, Axel Herman Haig and His Works (1905) The Fine Art Society, Ltd
- Mordaunt Crook, J. and Lennox-Boyd, C, Axel Haig and the Victorian Vision of the Middle Ages (1984) George Allen and Unwin
- Nairn, Ian; Pevsner, Nikolaus (1971) [1962]. The Buildings of England: Surrey (2nd ed.). Harmondsworth: Penguin Books. ISBN 0-300-09675-5.
