= Haslemere =

Town in Surrey, England

Coordinates: 51°05′24″N 0°42′43″W

- Town and civil parish
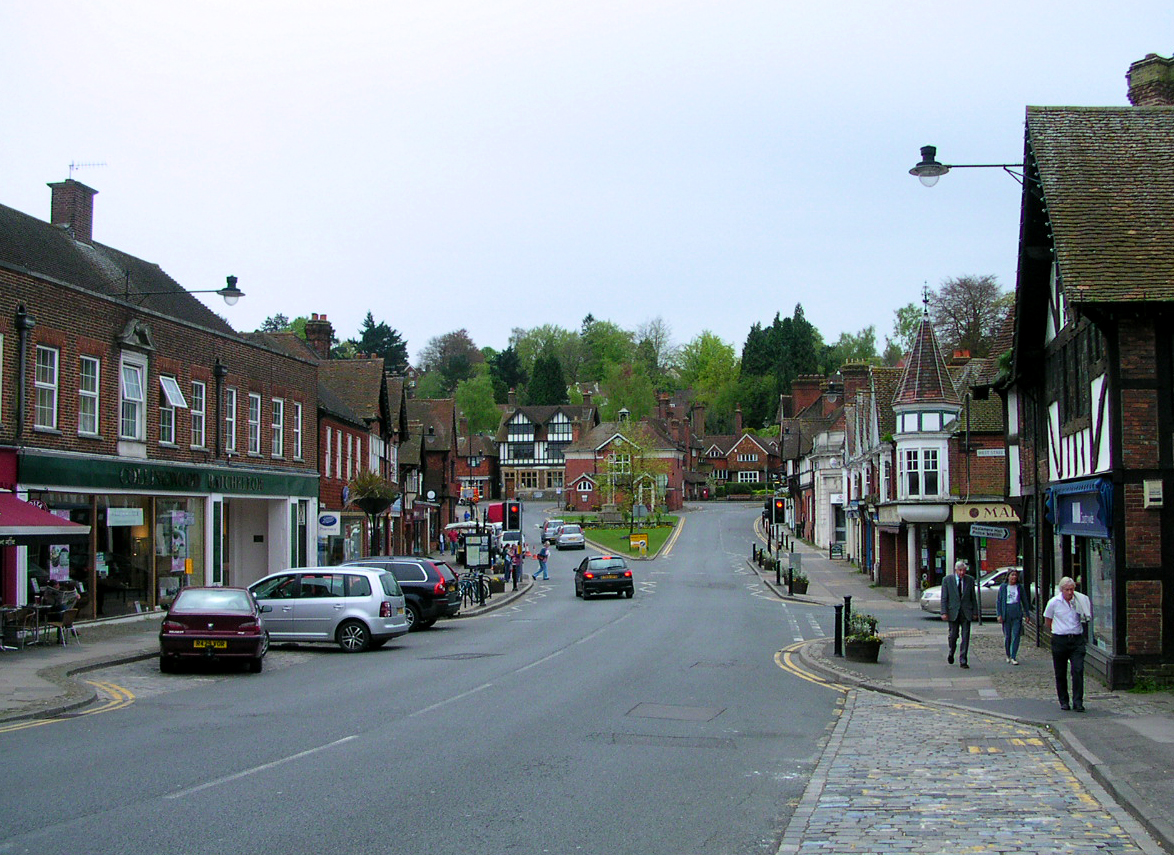
- The High Street, 2008

- Location within Surrey
- Area: 23.27 km^{2} (8.98 sq mi) Civil Parish
- Population: 17,279 (2021 Census)
  - Density: 743/km^{2} (1,920/sq mi)
- OS grid reference: SU9032
  - London: 38 mi (62 km) north east
- Civil parish: Haslemere
- District: Waverley
- Shire county: Surrey
- Region: South East
- Country: England
- Sovereign state: United Kingdom
- Post town: Haslemere
- Postcode district: GU27
- Dialling code: 01428
- Police: Surrey
- Fire: Surrey
- Ambulance: South East Coast
- UK Parliament: Farnham and Bordon

The town of Haslemere (/ˈheɪzəlmɪər/) and the villages of Shottermill and Grayswood are in south-west Surrey, England, around 38 miles (62 km) south-west of London. Together with the settlements of Hindhead and Beacon Hill, they comprise the civil parish of Haslemere in the Borough of Waverley. The tripoint between the counties of Surrey, Hampshire and West Sussex is at the west end of Shottermill.

Much of the civil parish is in the catchment area of the south branch of the River Wey, which rises on Blackdown in West Sussex. The urban areas of Haslemere and Shottermill are concentrated along the valleys of the young river and its tributaries, and many of the local roads are narrow and steep. The National Trust is a major landowner in the civil parish and its properties include Swan Barn Farm. The Surrey Hills National Landscape is to the north of the town and the South Downs National Park is to the south.

Haslemere is thought to have originated as a planned town in the 12th century and was awarded a market charter in 1221. By the early 16th century, it had become a Parliamentary borough and was represented by two MPs in the House of Commons until 1832. The town began to grow in the second half of the 19th century, following the opening of the London to Portsmouth railway line in 1859. In late-Victorian times, it became a centre for the Arts and Crafts movement and the International Dolmetsch Early Music Festival was founded in 1925. Haslemere became an Urban District in 1913, but under the Local Government Act 1972, its status was reduced to a civil parish with a town council.

Shottermill grew up as a hamlet near to one of the watermills on the River Wey in the 16th century. The settlement began to expand in the 1880s and joined the Haslemere Urban District in 1933. Until the end of the 19th century, Grayswood was a small farming community, but became an ecclesiastical parish in 1901.

== Toponymy ==
The first indication of a settlement at Haslemere is from 1180, when there is a record of a "Chapel of Piperham", belonging to the church at Chiddingfold. The town is recorded as Heselmere in 1221 and 1255, Haselmere in 1255 and 1441, Hasulmere in 1310, Hesselmere in 1612 and Hasselmere in 1654. The "mere" element of the name is thought to refer to a lake or pond on the west side of the High Street, which was visible until at least 1859. The "hasle" element of the name may refer to the common hazel tree or to the Heysulle family from Chiddingfold, who are known to have owned land in the area until the 14th century.

Grayswood appears as Grasewode in 1479 and 1518, Grasewood in 1537 and 1577, Grace Wood in 1568 and Greyes Wood in 1583. The "gray" element may derive from the Old French personal name "Gerard" and there may be an association with Gerardswoded, recorded in the 14th and 15th centuries near Witley, also in south west Surrey.

Shottermill is first recorded as Shottover in 1537 and Schoutouermyll in 1607. The modern spelling is first used in 1583 and references a watermill owned by the Shotter family. (Note: The Shotter family who owned the Shotter Mill, may have originated in Shotover in Oxfordshire.)

== Geography ==
=== Haslemere Civil Parish ===
The civil parish of Haslemere is in the borough of Waverley in south west Surrey, close to the borders with both Hampshire and West Sussex. The parish includes the villages of Hindhead, Beacon Hill and Grayswood, the settlements of Shottermill and Critchmere, as well as the town of Haslemere. (Note: The communities of Fernhurst, Camelsdale, Linchmere and Hammer are in West Sussex, immediately to the south of the civil parish of Haslemere.) The area is served by two principal transport routes, the London to Portsmouth railway line and the A3 trunk road, both of which run via Guildford.

Much of the civil parish is in the catchment area of the south branch of the River Wey, which rises on the northern slopes of Blackdown, to the south of Haslemere town. (Note: Blackdown is in West Sussex and lies outside of the civil parish. At 280 m (918 ft), it is the highest hill in the South Downs National Park and is the third-highest summit in South East England.) The area to the east of the town is drained by the River Arun. Around 48% of the civil parish is covered by woodland, 85 ha (210 acres) of which is classified as Ancient Woodland. Approximately 17% of the parish, 395 ha (980 acres), is protected and includes parts of two Special Protection Areas, one Special Area of Conservation and four Sites of Special Scientific Interest. The main settlements are surrounded by the Surrey Hills National Landscape.

=== Haslemere town, Shottermill and Grayswood ===
Haslemere town is in the south east of the civil parish. The commercial centre is at the junction of the High Street, Petworth Road and Lower Street, which together form an inverted "T" shape. (Note: The High Street is aligned north—south and runs along the watershed between the River Wey (to the west) and River Arun (to the east).) Shottermill, to the west, is on the north side of the valley of the south branch of the River Wey and is linked to Haslemere via Wey Hill. The hamlet of Critchmere is to the north west of Shottermill and the village of Grayswood is to the north of Haslemere town.

=== Geology ===
The oldest outcrops in the civil parish are of Weald Clay, which comes to the surface to the east of Grayswood, where the young tributaries of the River Arun have eroded the overlying strata. A Weald Clay sandstone is also exposed in the same area. The Atherfield Clay lies above the Weald Clay and is exposed as an outcrop north of Grayswood and also in the railway cutting, west of the station. The majority of Haslemere and Shottermill lie on the Hythe Beds of the Lower Greensand and the spring line, where the tributaries of the Wey and Arun rise, is on the junction between this permeable layer and the impermeable Atherfield Clay below. The gravel found in the river valleys is thought to have been deposited during the penultimate ice age and is composed of rock fragments of local origin. Much of the soil in the civil parish is free-draining, very acidic, sandy, loamy and of low fertility. To the east of Haslemere town and Graywsood, the soil is loamy and clayey, and is of low permeability.

== History ==
=== Early history ===
The earliest evidence for human activity in the Haslemere area is from the Neolithic. Flints dating from 4000 to 2400 BCE were discovered during archaeological surveys conducted prior to the construction of the Hindhead Tunnel. There may have been a settlement in the area in the mid-late Bronze Age and a Romano-British cemetery was discovered on the site of Beech Road, to the north of the town centre, at the start of the 20th century.

=== Governance ===
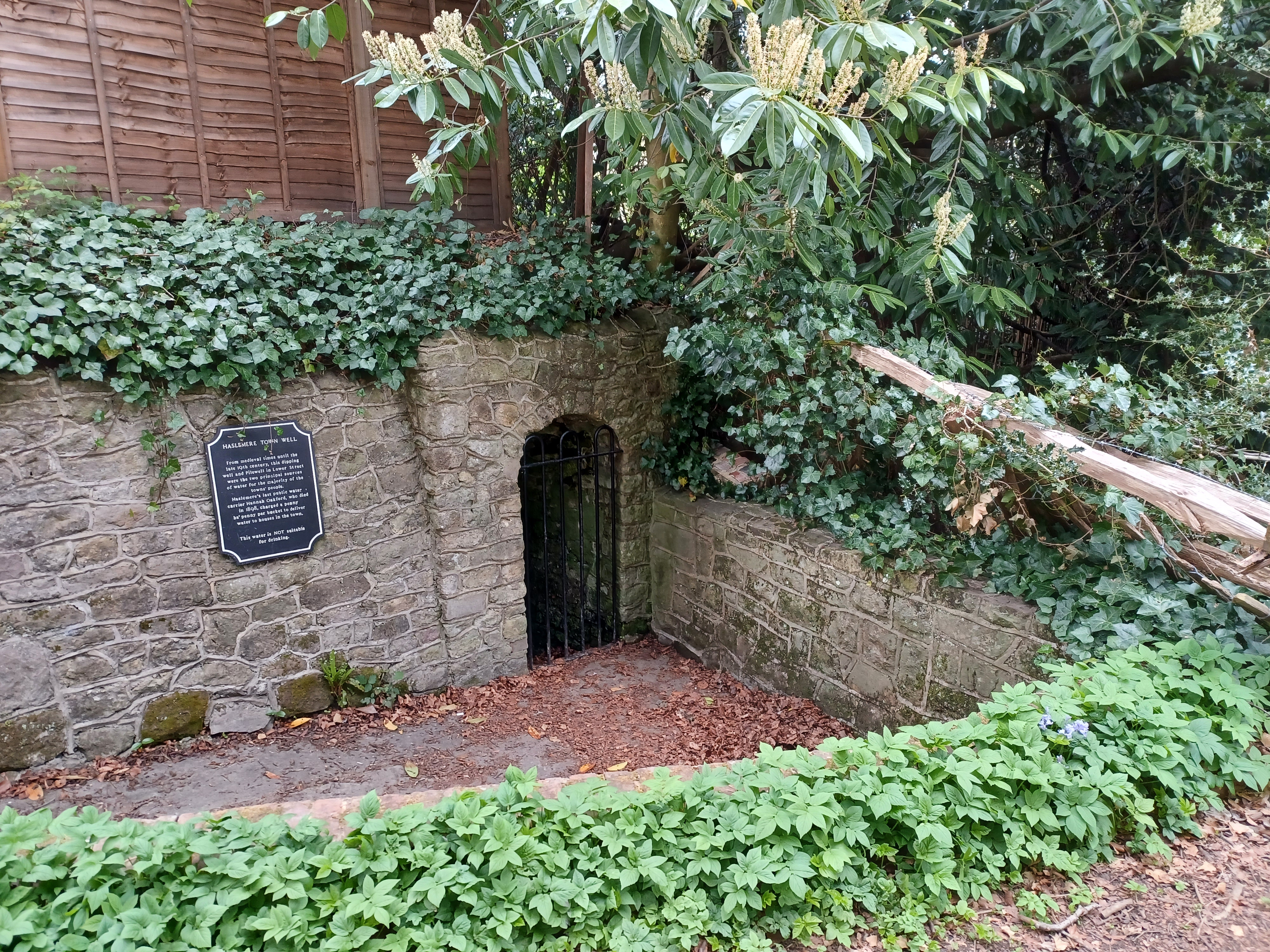
Town Well – one of the old wells which served the area (at the end of Well Lane)

Neither Shottermill nor Haslemere are directly mentioned in Domesday Book, but the land on which the two settlements are now located was divided between the Farnham and Godalming Hundreds respectively. The south western corner of Surrey is thought to have been sparsely populated in the 11th century, but it is possible that some of the mills listed under the entry for Farnham, were located on the Wey in the Shottermill area.

The first indication of a settlement at Haslemere is from 1180, when there is a record of a "Chapel of Piperham". The chapel belonged to the Parish of Chiddingfold, part of the manor of Godalming and is thought to have been either on or close to the site of the current St Bartholomew's Church. There may also have been a settlement on Haste Hill, to the south east of the town centre, and there are references to "Churchliten field" and the "Old church-yard" in records of the area.

The first use of the modern name Haslemere is from 1221, when permission for a market was given to Richard Poore, Bishop of Salisbury, indicating that the settlement was sufficiently large to be considered a town. In 1397, Richard II granted a charter to the settlement, confirming the order from 1221 and permitting an annual fair to be held in the town. The town remained in the possession of the Bishops of Salisbury until c. 1540, when it was purchased by the Crown.

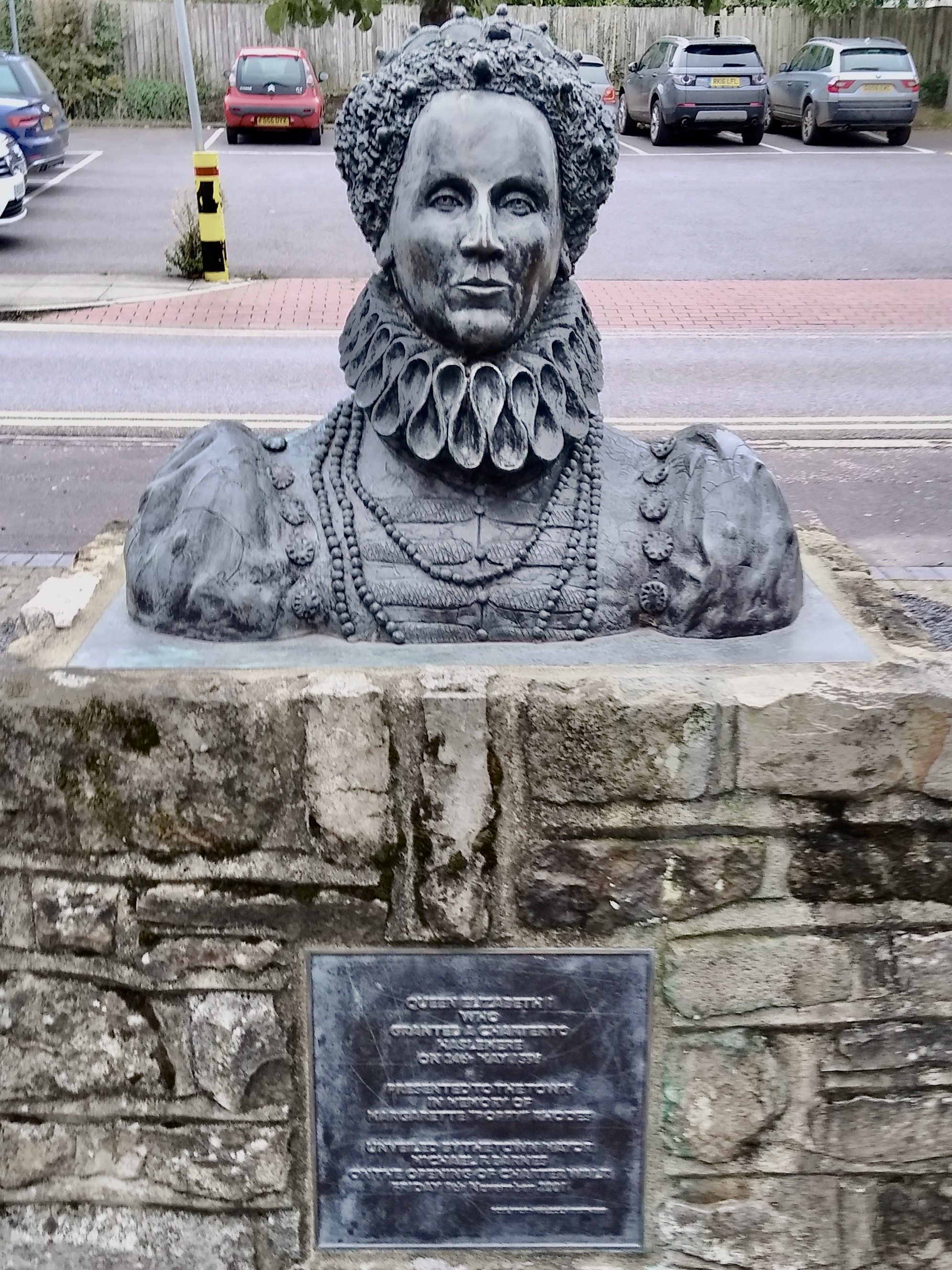
The bust of Elizabeth I by Malcolm Stathers was installed in Charter Walk in 2001.

The first indication of a settlement at Shottermill is from 1285, when reference is made to a Manor of Pitfold, covering the extreme southern portion of Farnham Hundred. From 1344, the manor was held by Edward III, but was granted to the Convent of Dartford in 1362. The land remained in the convent's possession until the Dissolution of the Monasteries in 1536, when it reverted to the Crown. A new charter was issued to Haslemere town by Elizabeth I in 1596. Today, this special status is celebrated with the Charter fair, held once every two years in the High Street.

Reforms during the Tudor period replaced the day-to-day administration of towns such as Haslemere in the hands of the vestry of the parish church. The vestry was charged with appointing a parish constable, running a lock-up, maintaining local roads and administering poor relief. In 1839, many administrative responsibilities were transferred to the Hambledon Rural District Council and in 1863, the civil parish of Haslemere was created, although local elections did not take place until the following year. In 1896, the Surrey Times praised the town's authorities, writing: "No parish council in the country has done better work than the Haslemere council. Sanitation, allotments, charities, lighting, roads, footpaths and waste lands have all been thoroughly and prudently looked after." A further change took place in 1913, when town was removed from the Hambledon Rural District and the Parish Council was promoted to the status of an Urban District Council (UDC). Initially the UDC was based at the Town Hall, but moved in 1926 to a building on Museum Hill, which had been vacated by the Haslemere Educational Museum.

Until 1896, Shottermill was part of the Frensham civil parish. It became independent in 1896, following the passing of the Local Government Act 1894. In 1900, the new council set up a District Sanitary Association to improve drainage and to install a sewerage system in the village. The Shottermill civil parish was disbanded in 1933, when the area became part of the Haslemere Urban District.

The most recent change in local government took place in 1974, when the urban districts of Farnham, Godalming and Haslemere were merged with Hambledon Rural District to form Waverley District. The Haslemere UDC was reduced to a town council and the reformed body readopted the town hall as its main meeting place.

=== Parliamentary borough ===
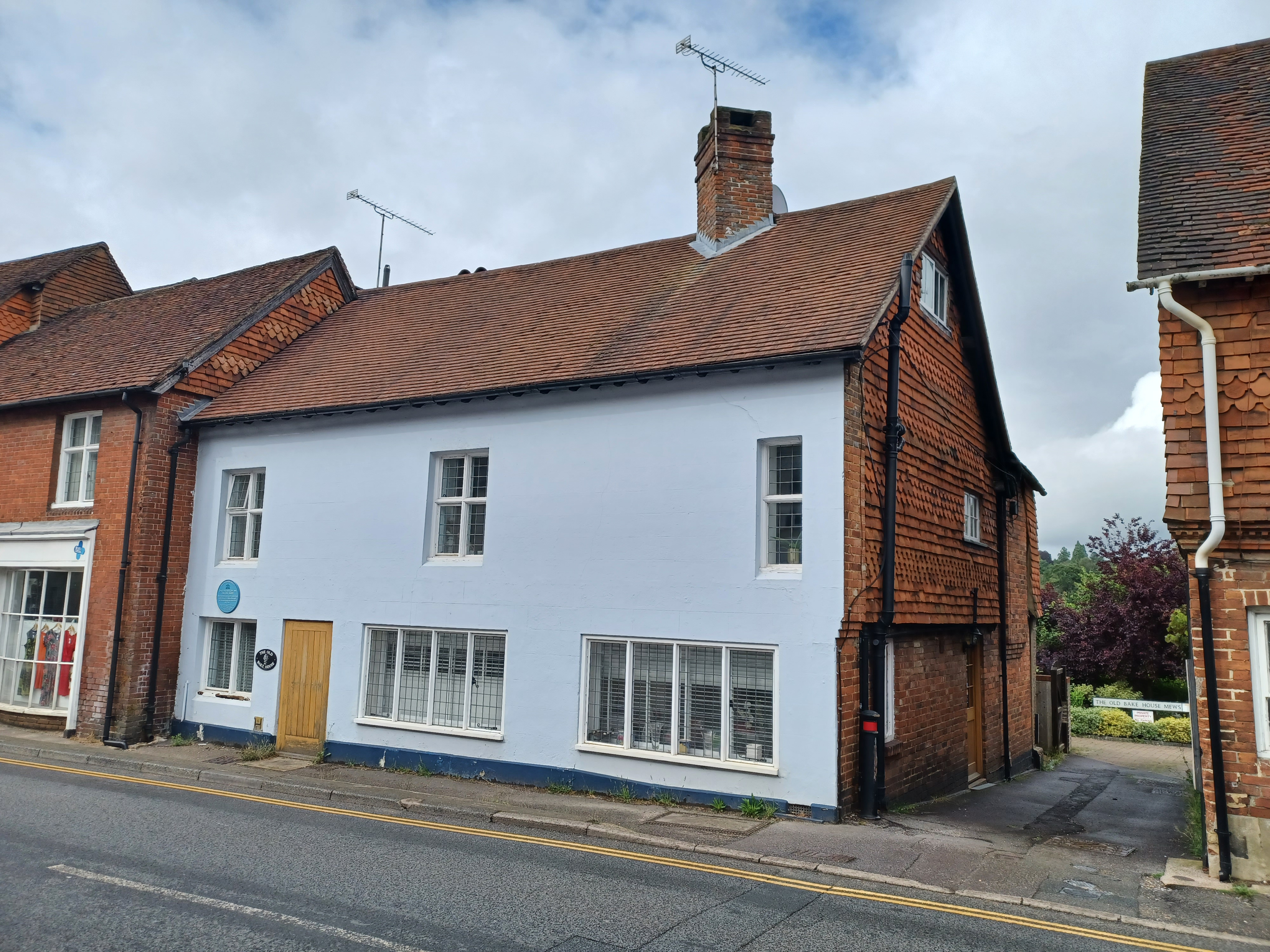
14 Petworth Road, the former Red Cow Inn

Haslemere may have become a parliamentary borough as early as 1230, when there is a record of the grant of a burgage plot in the settlement. It is referred to as a burgus in a document of 1377, but the first known MPs for the town were not elected until 1584. Elizabeth I confirmed the borough status in the charter of 1596. Until the Reform Act 1832, two MPs were elected to represent the town in the House of Commons. The electorate was confined to those holding property either as freeholders or as tenants of burgage properties, who paid rent to the lord of the manor. Electoral records show that for the elections of 1664 and 1735, there were only 82 and 85 eligible properties respectively. By the early 17th century, Haslemere had acquired a reputation as a pocket borough.

The More family, who owned Loseley Park, effectively controlled the borough for much of the 17th century. However, in 1722, More Molyneux and his favoured co-candidate, Montague Blundell, 1st Viscount Blundell, lost the election to James Oglethorpe and Peter Burrell. In 1754, James More Molyneux, son of More Molyneux, was determined to reclaim the seat for his family. He and his favoured co-candidate, Philip Carteret Webb, purchased 34 freeholds and tenements, and installed their own representative as Bailiff to oversee the election. The freehold of the Red Cow Inn was split into shares, to further increase the number likely to vote for More Molyneux and Webb, who were duly elected.

The final elections in Haslemere Borough took place in 1830 and two years later the constituency was combined with that of Farnham.

=== Transport and communications ===
Before the start of the 18th century, the local roads were the responsibility of the parishes through which they passed. The main road between London and Portsmouth ran over Gibbet Hill to the west of Hindhead, and stagecoaches are known to have travelled along this section from 1732. It became the responsibility of a turnpike trust in 1749 and was rerouted around the edge of the Devil's Punch Bowl in 1826, to reduce the gradient to a maximum of 5%. This road is now known as the A3 and was further improved in 2011, with the opening of the Hindhead Tunnel.

The road through Grayswood and Haslemere became a turnpike in 1764. A mail coach started running along this road, now the A286, in 1769. In the early 19th century, there were as many as 24 stagecoaches a day passing through the town, however the number reduced following the opening of the railway station at Alton in 1841.

The railway line through Haslemere was authorised by parliament in July 1853 and was built by the civil engineer, Thomas Brassey. Construction work started in August 1853, but was not completed until May 1858, in part because of the magnitude of the excavation work required for the deep cutting through Haslemere. The line opened on 1 January 1859, with trains running as far as Havant. Although the earthworks were built to accommodate two tracks, initially only a single line was installed. The line was doubled in 1876–77 and the station platforms at Haslemere were extended to allow express services to call from January 1894.

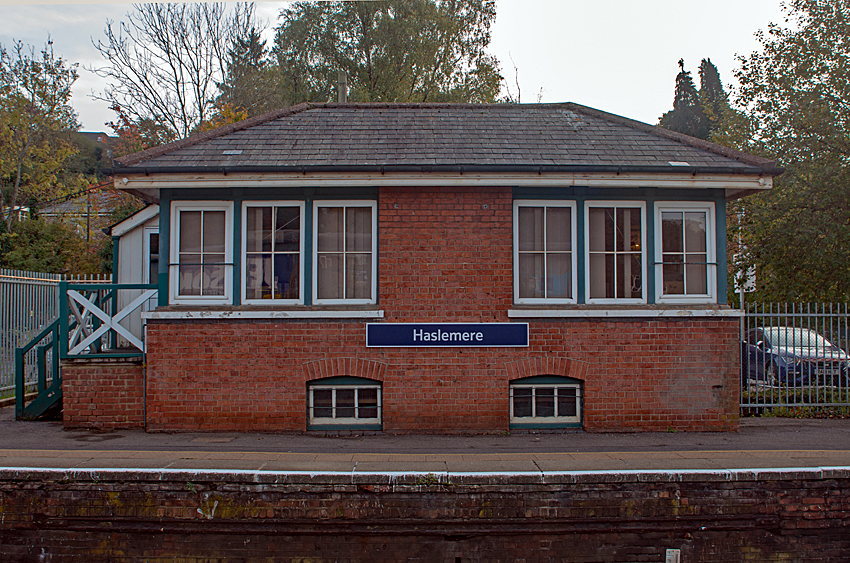
Haslemere signal box

The Grade II-listed station signal box was constructed in 1894. It is built in red brick with a hipped Welsh Slate roof and is one of only two surviving examples of a platform-mounted LSWR Type 4 design. (Note: Haslemere Signal Box retains its original 47-lever frame.) The semaphore signals in the station were replaced by colour lights in 1937, the same year that the line was electrified.

=== Industry and commerce ===
The market charter for Haslemere was granted in 1221 and a license to hold an annual fair followed in 1397. By the end of the Middle Ages, it would appear that the market was no longer being held regularly, necessitating the regrant of the charter by Elizabeth I in 1596. The market was held at the south end of the High Street, the widest part, and a market house was built at that location in 1626. The original building would have been constructed of wood, but it was replaced by a brick structure, the present Town Hall, in 1814.

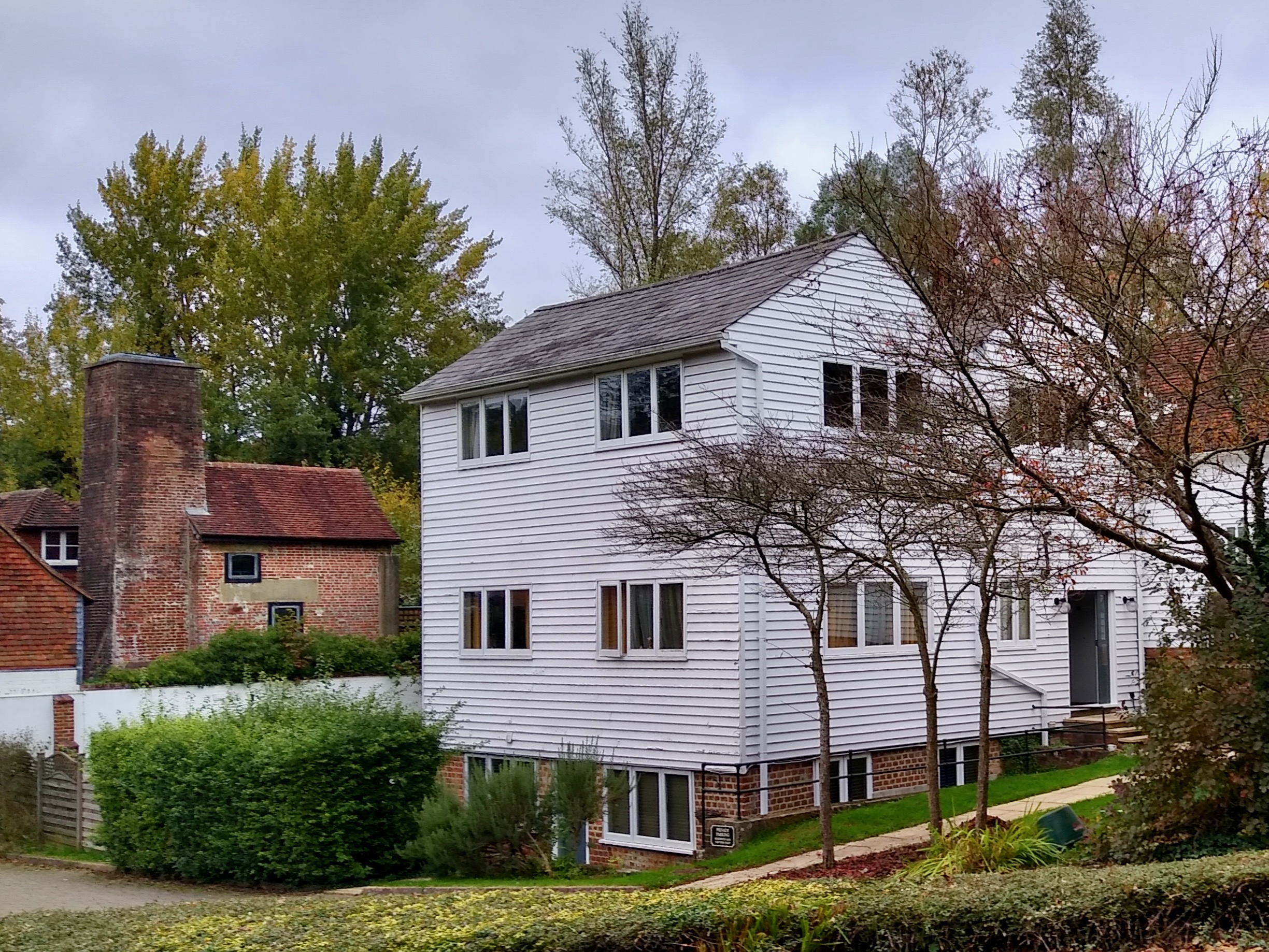
Sickle Mill

By the end of the medieval period, there were at least five watermills on the River Wey and its tributaries near Haslemere. The oldest, at Pitfold, was most likely established in Saxon times and operated as a corn mill until the 1340s, when it appears to have become a fulling mill for wool. The original Shotter Mill, now in West Sussex, was founded in the 1640s and a hamlet grew up to the north, adopting its name. Until 1880, the area was dominated by the farms belonging to Pitfold Manor and the mills were mostly used for grinding corn. From the mid-18th century, some of the mill sites were converted for other purposes, including Sickle Mill, owned by the Simmons family, which was used for paper manufacturing from c. 1785. Paper making took place at three sites around Shottermill until the mid-1850s.

Between the 16th and the 18th centuries, Shottermill was a centre for iron making. A mill at Pophole (located at the modern-day tripoint between Surrey, West Sussex and Hampshire) harnessed water power to drive bellows for smelting and had a hammer for making iron bars. Production was well established by 1574 and it is probable that the mill supplied iron for the manufacture of cannons for the Navy. Much of the history of Pophole Mill is unclear, but it appears that activity at the site ceased shortly after 1732.

The civil parish was also a centre for textiles manufacture. Until c. 1820, around 200 local inhabitants were engaged in silk weaving, which was carried out as a cottage industry. There was also a crape factory in Church Lane. In 1835, the Appleton family installed machinery for spinning and weaving at Pitfold Mill and began to make worsted lace and epaulettes for military uniforms. By 1851, Thomas Appleton was employing 100 workers and in 1854 he expanded his business with the purchase of Sickle Mill. The company moved to London in the 1880s.

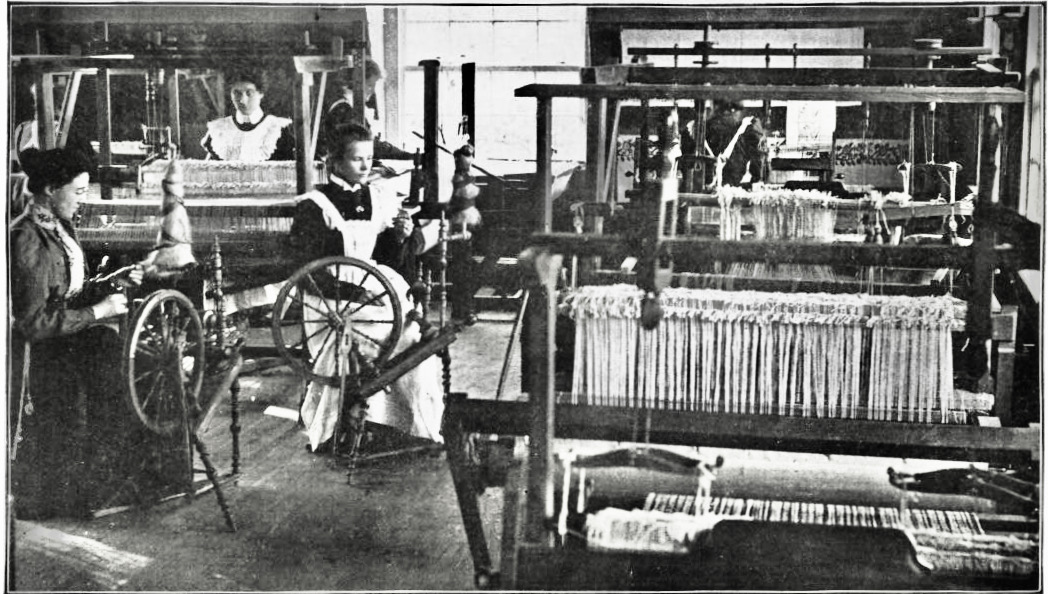
Interior of the Weaving House, Foundry Road (1902)

The Peasant Arts Society was founded in Haslemere in the 1890s, when the weaver Maude King and her sister, the tapestry maker Ethel Blount, moved to the area. It was one of a number of organisations associated with the Arts and Crafts movement, that were founded in rural England at around the same time. Members, all drawn from the local working class, produced fabrics, rugs and tapestries, which were sold at exhibitions around the country. Ethel Blount and her husband Godfrey set up the Tapestry House in Foundry Meadow for the manufacture of appliqué needlework and embroidered items in 1896. Six years later, they also established the John Ruskin School and the St Cross School of Handicraft. The Peasant Arts Society closed in 1933, following the deaths of several of the founder members.

=== Residential development ===
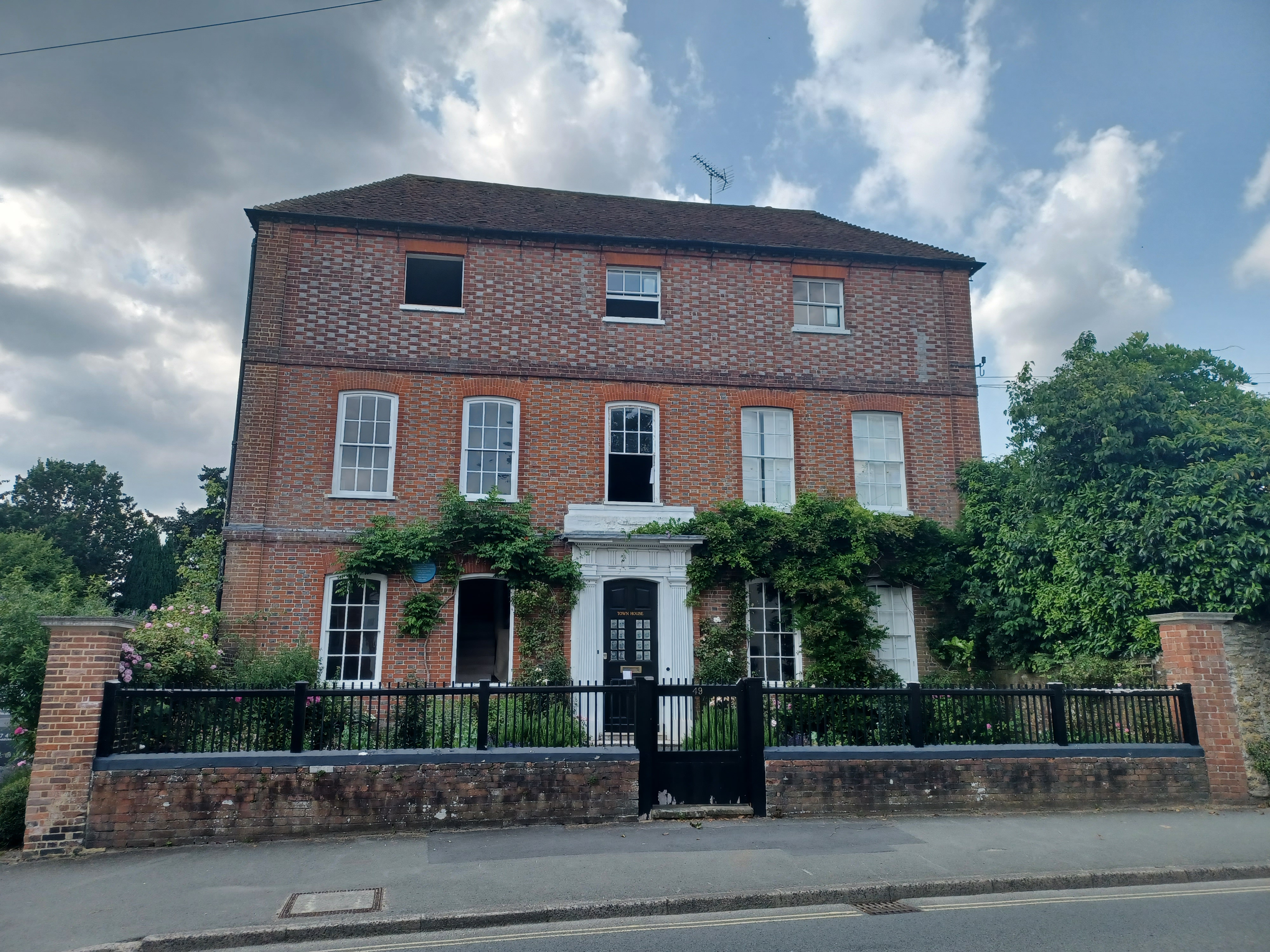
Town House, High Street

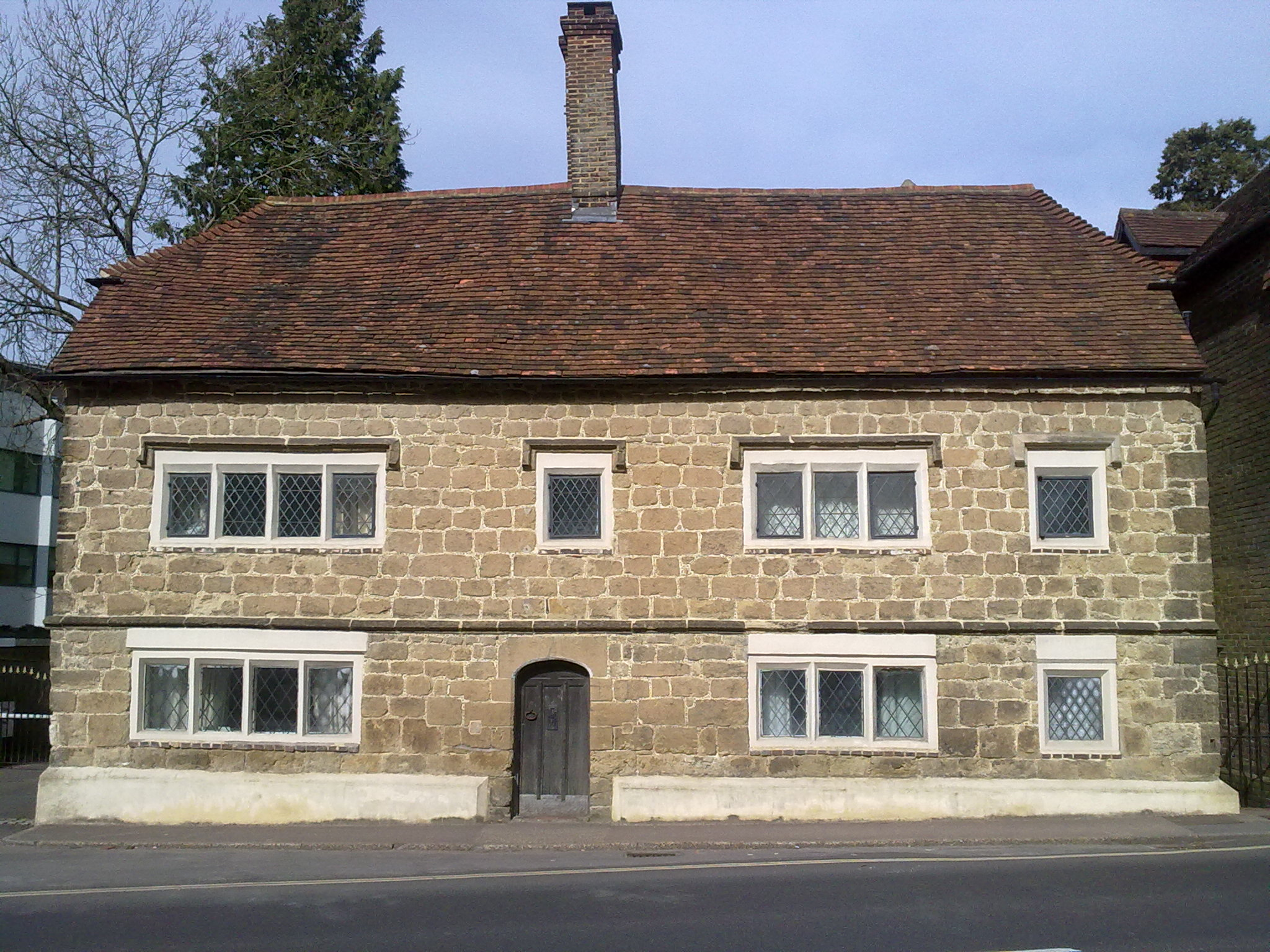
Tudor House, Lower Street

The earliest surviving map of Haslemere, dating from 1735, shows that the High Street was fronted by a number of large houses. A few buildings survive from this period, including Town House and the Georgian House Hotel, as well as Tudor House, Fern Cottage and 10 High Street, which date from the previous century. There are several houses on Petworth Road, to the east of the town centre, which date from the 16th and 17th centuries.

Comparison of the 1735 map and the tithe map of 1842, indicates that there had been little change in the size of the settlement during the intervening hundred years, although a few properties had been built in the Wey Hill area. Houses constructed in the early 19th century include Broad Dene Grayswood House and Pound Corner House. Inclosure acts affecting the Haslemere area were passed in 1856, shortly before the opening of the railway line. The town began to appeal to new wealthy residents, who moved to the area from London, and also to tourists visiting the surrounding countryside. (Note: Among those who moved to the area in the mid-19th century, was Alfred, Lord Tennyson, who commissioned the architect, James Knowles to build Aldworth House on Blackdown in 1869.) In the late 1860s and early 1870s, houses began to spread along Lower Street towards Shottermill.

Little development took place in Shottermill before 1880. (Note: Pre-19th century listed houses in Shottermill include Rose Cottage (late medieval) Buffbeards and Lees Cottage (16th century), Middlemarch (17th century) Cherrimans and 53 and 55 Lion Lane (18th century).) The census returns indicate that there was a doubling of the population between 1881 and 1891, stimulated in part by the break-up of the Pitfold Manor estate in 1880. Several new houses for the gentry were built in the following decade, during which land to the north west of the village was donated to the National Trust. Housing for labourers and artisans was constructed along Lion Lane between 1880 and 1901, and dwellings began to spread towards Critchmere Hill in the first decade of the 20th century. The first houses in Critchmere Lane date from 1921 and were constructed by the Farnham Rural District Council. Many of the houses in the area were built using local bricks and there were brickworks on Wey Hill (formerly Clay Hill) and on Border Road until the early 20th century. Development of the west of Shottermill continued in the 1930s, with the creation of Pitfold and Sunvale Avenues.

Beech Road, to the north of Haslemere town centre, and Chestnut Avenue, to the west, were laid out in the early 1900s. Houses were also built in Grayswood at around the same time. Between 1900 and 1940, the Haslemere Tenants Society built 91 houses in the Fieldway, Bridge Road and Lion Mead area, which were subsequently acquired by the Haslemere UDC. In 1950, the council began to construct a new estate of 88 houses in Shottermill, close to the Sickle Mill, and purchased 100 pre-fabricated houses which had been erected by the Admiralty on Woolmer Hill during the Second World War. In 1953, the UDC bought 38 acres (15 ha) of land to the north of St Bartholomew's Church for the Chatsworth Avenue and Weycombe Road estates. Although many large, detached houses on Bunch and Farnham Lanes, to the north of Shottermill, had been built in the Edwardian period, infilling took place in this area in the second half of the 20th century. Other post-war developments include Scotland Close, Lythe Hill Park and Meadowlands Drive. The Deepdene estate, a mixed estate of houses of varying sizes, was constructed at the west end of Shottermill in the 1980s.

=== Haslemere in the world wars ===
At the start of the First World War, Haslemere had a population of around 4000, of whom roughly 200 served in the armed forces during the conflict. Since the town was on the route from London to Portsmouth, several army units were billeted nearby while awaiting onward transportation to France. In 1915, Canadian soldiers moved to Bramshott Camp and undertook training in the area.

Around 2,000 children were evacuated from London to the Haslemere area in September 1939, the majority of whom were found accommodation within a 10 km (6 mi) radius of the town. The following month, the research division of the Admiralty Signals and Radar Establishment, part of HMS Mercury, was relocated from Portsmouth to Lythe Hill, a country house to the south east of the town. In 1942, a British Restaurant, a communal kitchen for those who had been bombed out of their homes, opened in Wey Hill, although Haslemere sustained only very limited damage from air raids. Several aeroplanes crashed in the area, including an RAF aircraft close to the Holy Cross Hospital in Shottermill. In the summer of 1944, a V-1 flying bomb landed close to Three Gates Lane, but there were no casualties. Only 7 civilians died as a result of enemy action in Haslemere Urban District during the entire war.

== National and local government ==
=== UK parliament ===
The entirety of the Haslemere civil parish is in the parliamentary constituency of Farnham and Bordon and is represented in Parliament by Conservative Greg Stafford. From 2005 to 2024 it was in South West Surrey and represented by Jeremy Hunt. Between 1984 and 2005, the seat was held by Virginia Bottomley, who was elevated to the House of Lords as Baroness Bottomley of Nettlestone in the year she left the House of Commons.

=== County Council ===
Councillors are elected to Surrey County Council every four years. Haslemere, Shottermill and Grayswood are in the Haslemere electoral division, but Hindhead and Beacon Hill are in the Waverley Western Villages electoral division.

=== Borough council ===
The civil parish is divided between three wards, each of which elect three councillors to Waverley Borough Council. The three wards are Haslemere East and Grayswood, Haslemere Critchmere and Shottermill, and Hindhead.

=== Town Council ===
Haslemere Town Council is the lowest tier of local government, covering the whole civil parish. Eighteen councillors are elected every four years. The council is based at Haslemere Town Hall. Each year in May, the councillors elect a Mayor, who serves for a period of one year.

=== Twin towns ===
Haslemere is twinned with Bernay in France and Horb am Neckar in Germany.

== Demography and housing ==
2011 Census: key statistics
Output area	Area	Population	Households	Homes owned outright	Homes owned with a loan
Haslemere East and Grayswood	9.94 km^{2} (3.84 sq mi)	6,553	2,766	39.7%	34.4%
Haslemere Critchmere and Shottermill	6.50 km^{2} (2.51 sq mi)	5,981	2,445	29.6%	40.7%
Hindhead and Beacon Hill	6.82 km^{2} (2.63 sq mi)	4,292	1,688	38.6%	38.5%
Total for Haslemere Civil Parish	23.27 km^{2} (8.98 sq mi)	16,826	6,899	35.8%	37.6%
Regional average				35.1%	32.5%

2011 Census: homes
Output area	Detached	Semi-detached	Terraced	Flats and apartments	Caravans, temporary and mobile homes
Haslemere East and Grayswood	1,202	637	454	613	1
Haslemere Critchmere and Shottermill	849	611	398	694	1
Hindhead and Beacon Hill	858	289	121	495	0
Total for Haslemere Civil Parish	2,909	1,537	973	1,802	2
Regional average	28%	27.6%	22.4%	21.2%	0.7%

== Public services ==
=== Utilities ===
Before the start of the 16th century, local residents obtained drinking water either from springs or from the River Wey. Haslemere Town Well was dug c. 1500 and there was also a second well, known as Pilewell, in Lower Street. Water would be delivered to homes by a water carrier, the last of whom, Hannah Oakford, died in 1898. (Note: Hannah Oakford charged 1½ pennies per bucket to deliver water to homes in Haslemere.) The piped water supply to Haslemere began in the 1880s, when a series of pumping stations was installed to deliver water to standpipes in the town from springs on the lower slopes of Blackdown. The Wey Valley Water Company was formed in 1898 and its mains were extended to Shottermill in 1900. In 1907, a public water works was opened close to Chase Farm to serve both settlements. The supply of drinking water to Grayswood began in 1920.

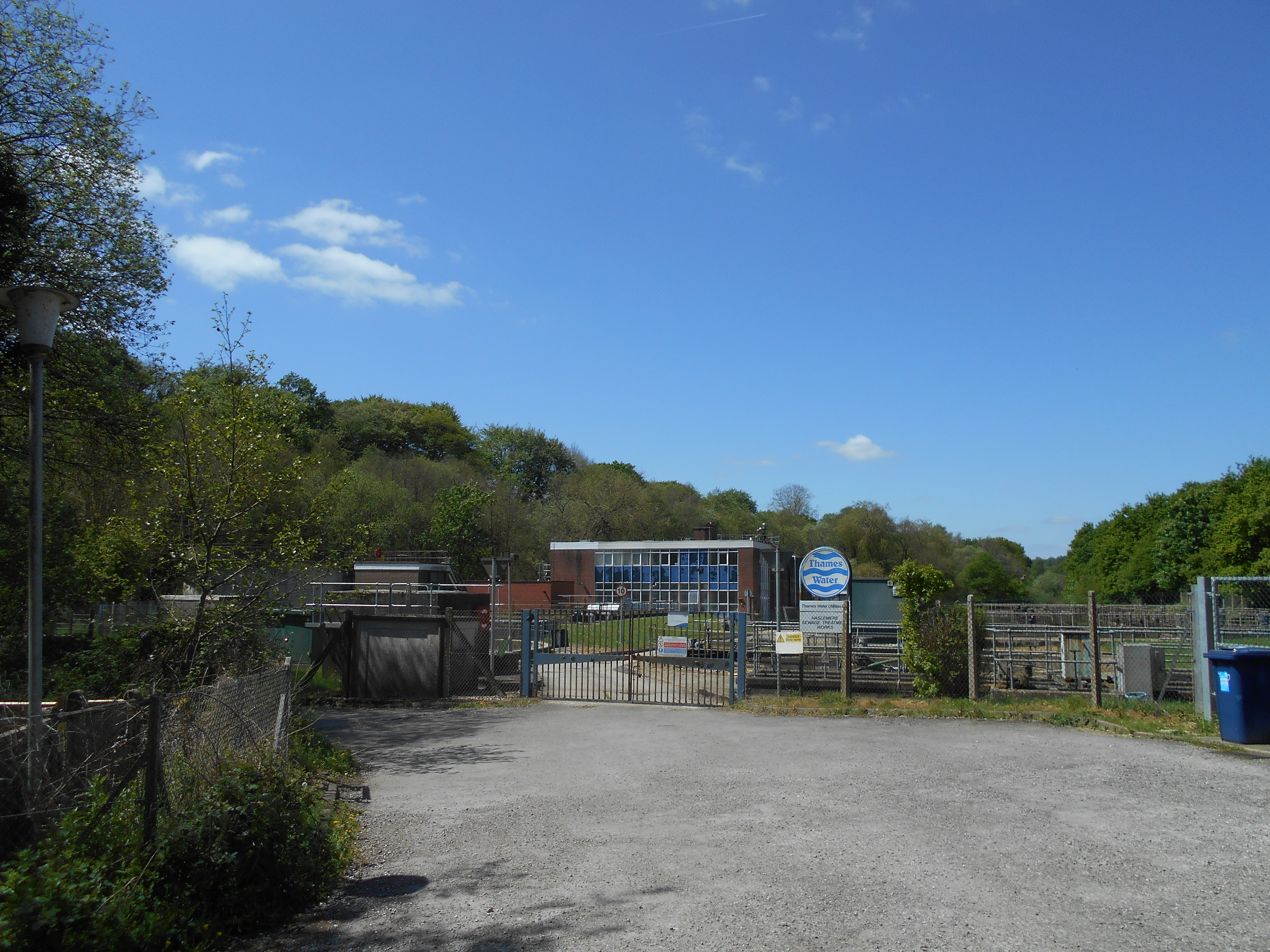
Haslemere Sewage Treatment Works

Until the late 19th century, the sewage produced by the town was dumped in cesspits and there are several recorded instances of diphtheria and typhoid outbreaks. The first sewage treatment works in Haslemere was established in Foundry Road in 1898 and a second works followed to the west of Shottermill off Critchmore Lane in 1911. The Shottermill works was enlarged in 1911 and in 1933 became responsible for treating all sewage from the Haslemere UDC area.

The first gas supply to Haslemere began in 1868–69 and was used for street lighting. (Note: The town gasworks were in Foundry Road, which was renamed King's Road for the visit of Edward VII to Haslemere in 1903.) The gas mains reached Shottermill in 1903. Electric street lighting with sodium lamps was installed between 1952 and 1955.

The Hindhead and District Electric Light Company was formed in 1901 and opened an electricity generating station in Hindhead village in the same year. (Note: When it opened in 1901, the Hindhead generating station had an installed capacity of 38 kW and by the time of its closure in 1953, it was capable of generating 925 kW.) The first mains electricity cables were laid from Hindhead to Haslemere and Shottermill in 1910.

=== Emergency services ===
The first known parish constable in the area was serving in Haslemere in 1672, when a staff of office was commissioned. Policing became the responsibility of the Surrey Constabulary on its creation in 1851. The first police officer to be stationed in Grayswood was appointed in 1904. Haslemere Police Station, in West Street, closed in 2012. In 2021, policing in the town is the responsibility of Surrey Police and the nearest police station run by the force is at Guildford.

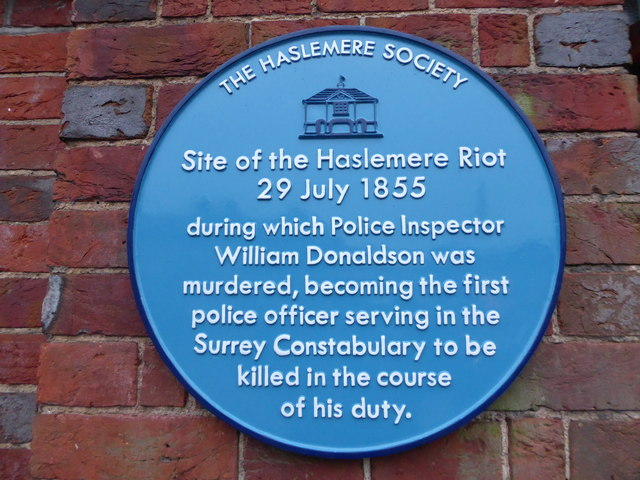
Blue plaque honouring Inspector William Donaldson, Town Hall

Construction of the railway line through Haslemere began in 1853 and, by the summer of 1855, around 200 navvies were lodging in the town. On the night of 29 July of that year, a group of workmen was drinking in the Kings Arms pub, when Police Inspector William Donaldson and a junior colleague arrived to enforce the midnight closing time. A fight broke out soon after the navvies left the building, during which Donaldson received a fatal blow to the head. He died at the police station around three hours later. Five men were subsequently arrested, of whom four were convicted of manslaughter at the subsequent trial. Thomas Wood, who is thought to have dealt the fatal blow, was transported to Fremantle, Western Australia after serving a one-year prison sentence in London. Inspector Donaldson was buried in St Bartholomew's churchyard in Haslemere. His death is commemorated by a blue plaque on the wall of the Town Hall.

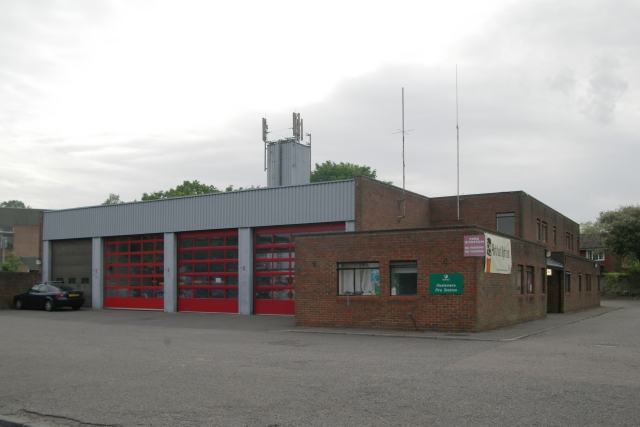
Haslemere Fire Station

The Haslemere fire brigade was formed in 1877 and, until 1907, was equipped with a horse-drawn fire pump. From 1906, Shottermill was served by the Hindhead and Grayshott brigade, but assistance was given by the Haslemere brigade when necessary. In 2021, the local fire authority is Surrey County Council and the statutory fire service is Surrey Fire and Rescue Service. Haslemere Ambulance Station, in Church Lane, is run by the South East Coast Ambulance Service.

=== Healthcare ===
The first recorded medical healer in Haslemere was Robert Shotter (1553–1639), of whom the vicar at the time wrote: "An expert chirugeon [surgeon] and cured in his life multitudes of impotent poor people of foul and dangerous sorances [diseases], at his own charge…" In 2021, the GP surgery serving the town is at Haslemere Health Centre, in Church Lane.

The first hospital to be built in Haslemere was a cottage hospital on Shepherd's Hill. It opened in 1898 with four beds and its construction was funded by a donation from the Penfold Family. By the early 1920s, it was clear that a new facility was required and a new hospital was opened in 1923 on Church Lane. In 2021, the hospital functions as a community hospital, with a minor injuries unit and two inpatient wards. It also offers a range of outpatient services.

Holy Cross Hospital, to the north of Shottermill, was opened in 1917 as a tuberculosis sanatorium by the Congregation of the Daughters of the Cross of Liège. In the 1950s it became a small general hospital and later a specialist facility for oral and facial surgery. Since 1991 it has specialised in the treatment of patients with severe and complex neurological conditions. In 2021, it provides inpatient services for people with severe disabilities and long-term medical conditions. It also offers physiotherapy services to outpatients.

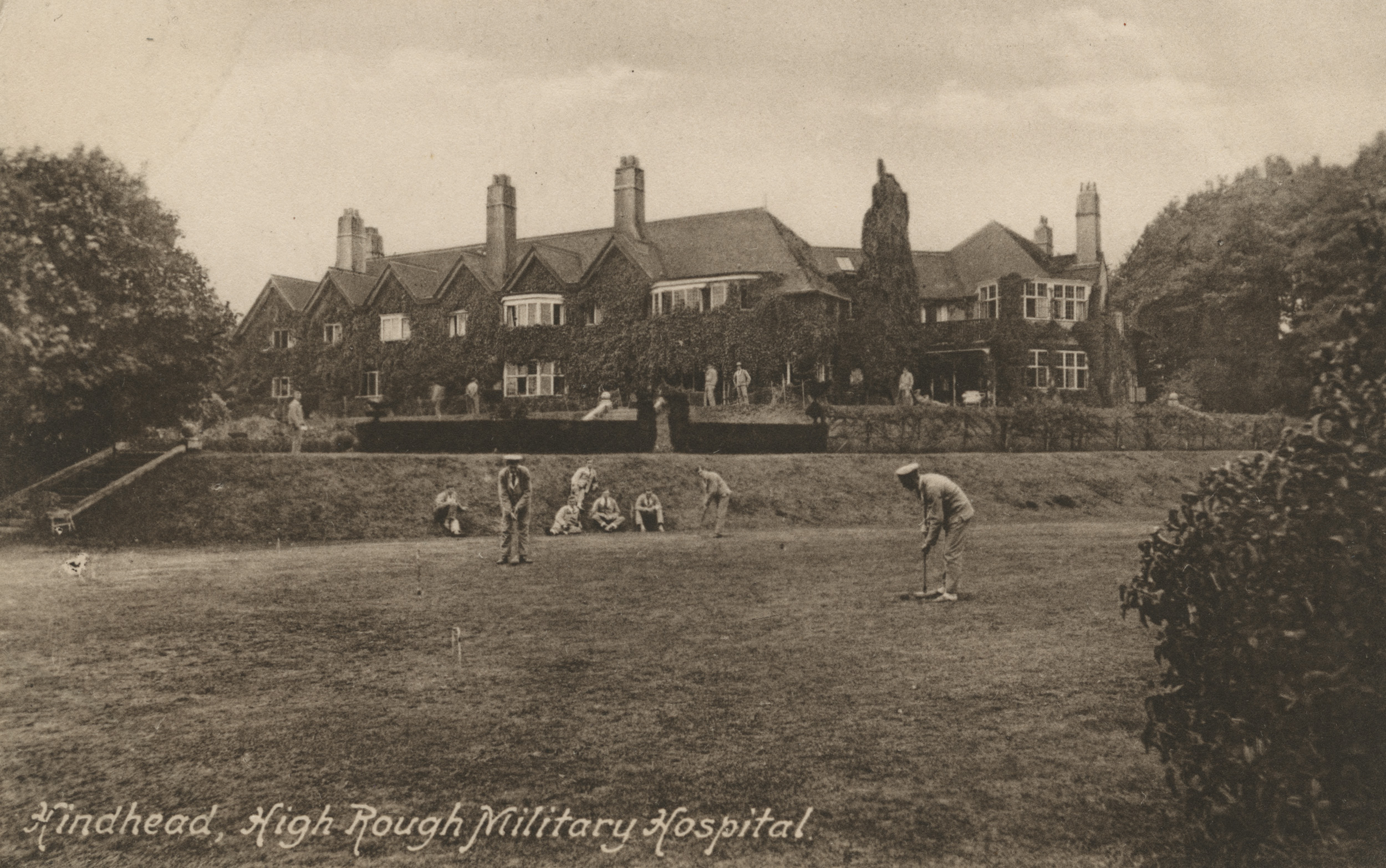
High Rough Hospital during the First World War

There were two auxiliary hospitals in the Haslemere area during the First World War. Both were affiliates of the Frensham Hill Military Hospital and were named after the country houses in which they were established. High Rough Hospital had 40 beds and was opened on Farnham Lane in May 1915. Church Hill Hospital was opened in April 1917 with 38 beds.

The first dedicated support centre for Haslemere residents with dementia was opened in 1994 at The Marjorie Gray Hall on Grayswood Road, to the north of the town centre. Initially run by the Alzheimer's Society, responsibility for the centre passed to a dedicated local charity in 2017. The centre provides respite day care four days a week for people with dementia.

The nearest hospital with an accident and emergency department is the Royal Surrey County Hospital in Guildford.

== Transport ==
=== Roads ===
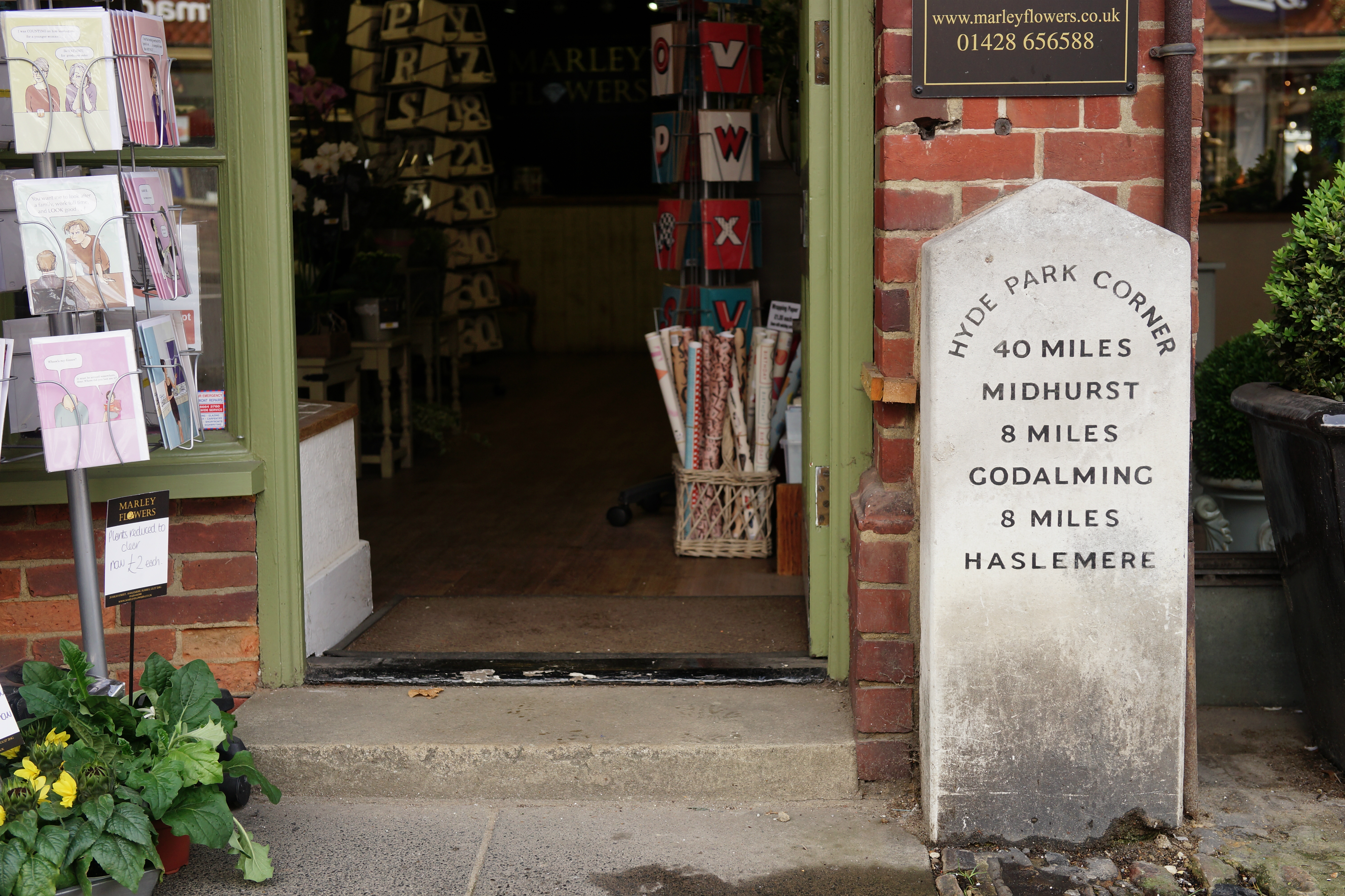
Mile post, High Street

Many of the roads in the area originated as medieval tracks and owing to the local topography, are narrow, twisting and steep. The principal route through Haslemere is the A286, which connects the town with Godalming and Grayswood (to the north) and with Midhurst (to the south). The A287 runs south from Hindhead and passes through the west end of Shottermill, before joining the A286 close to Camelsdale. The main east–west road is the B2131, which links Haslemere to Chiddingfold and Petworth to the east, and to Liphook to the west.

=== Buses ===
Haslemere is linked by a number of bus routes to surrounding towns and villages in south west Surrey, West Sussex and east Hampshire. Operators serving the town include Stagecoach and Waverley Hoppa.

=== Trains ===
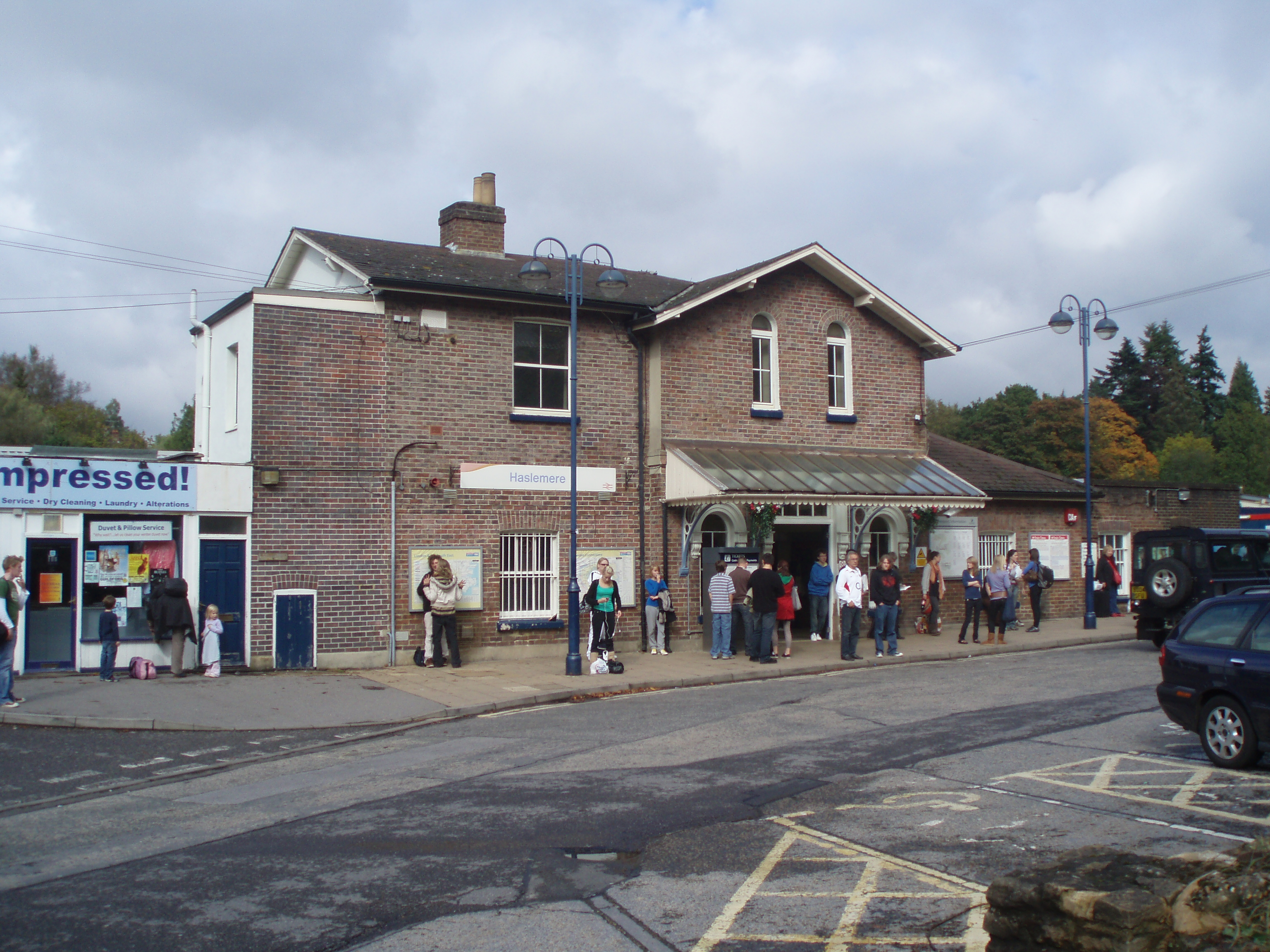
Front of Haslemere railway station

Haslemere railway station is to the west of the town centre. It is managed by South Western Railway, which operates all services. Trains run to London Waterloo via Guildford and to Portsmouth Harbour via Havant.

=== Cycling ===
The Haslemere Link is a spur of the Surrey Cycleway. It runs north east from the town to join the main circular route to the east of Chiddingfold.

=== Long-distance footpaths ===
Haslemere is the western terminus of the Greensand Way, a long-distance footpath that runs for 108 miles (174 km) along the Greensand Ridge to Hamstreet in Kent. The 64-mile (103 km) Serpent Trail links Haslemere to Petersfield via Blackdown and Petworth. The Sussex Border Path runs to the south of Haslemere and Shottermill.

== Education ==
=== Maintained schools ===
St Bartholomew's Primary School was founded as a National school c. 1813. In 1869 a school board was established in Haslemere, which commissioned the construction of a new building adjacent to the parish church. The school moved to its current site on Derby Road in 1986.

Shottermill Infant School and Shottermill Junior School trace their origins to a Church of England school that was opened in the village c. 1846. Initially there were 40 pupils and only one teacher, but as numbers increased, the school moved to new premises to the north east of Shottermill Church. The building was extended in 1885 and again in 1896–98. In the early 1900s, the infants department became a separate school in its own right and moved to Church Road. In 1927, the county council took over the running of the two schools and constructed new premises for each on Lion Lane. (Note: The old Church School premises at Junction Place are now used by the Shottermill Club, which was originally founded in 1892.)

Grayswood Primary School was founded as a National school in 1862. It moved to its current site, as an infants' school, in January 1905 with 100 pupils. It was expanded in 2015 to become a primary school, educating up to 210 children between the ages of 4 and 11.

Woolmer Hill School is a secondary school to the north west of Shottermill. It was constructed in 1950 on a 10 ha (25-acre) site, under the provisions of the Education Act 1944. It became a member of the Weydon Multi-Academy Trust in 2017. In 2025, it educated around 800 students between the ages of 11 and 16.

=== Independent schools ===
St Ives School, to the north east of Haslemere town centre, is a coeducational prep school for children aged 2–11. It was founded in College Hill in 1911 and moved to its current location in Three Gates Lane in 1966. The school became part of United Learning in September 2013.

The Royal School is a coeducational day and boarding school to the north of Shottermill. It was founded in 1840 as the Royal Naval School and was intended to educate the sisters and daughters of naval and marine officers. It merged in 1995 with The Grove School, also a girls-only school, to create The Royal School. In 2011 the school became co-educational and in 2019 it became part of United Learning. It closed in 2025.

=== Former schools ===
Stoatley Rough School was founded in 1934 by Hilde Lion to educate the children of Jewish refugees, who had fled from Nazi Germany. As war approached, the boarding school accepted many children rescued under the Kindertransport scheme. After the end of the war it began to focus on educating disadvantaged British pupils. It closed in 1960, following the retirement of its founder.

Wispers School was an independent girls' boarding school originally founded in 1947. It moved to Oak Hall in 1969 and closed in 2008.

=== Religious institute ===
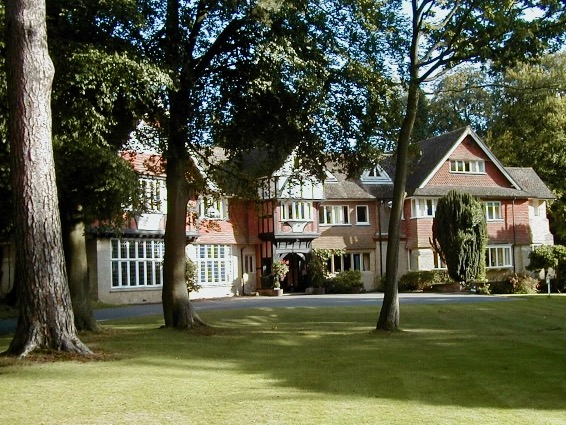
Haslemere campus of Jamia Ahmadiyya, formerly Branksome Conference Centre

The UK campus of the Islamic university, Jamia Ahmadiyya, was founded in Colliers Wood in 2005 and relocated to Haslemere in 2012. It offers a seven-year course to train missionaries from the Ahmadiyya Muslim Community and educates over 130 students at any one time. The Haslemere campus is a Grade II*-listed former country house, built in 1901, which was the International Education Centre for Olivetti in the early 1970s. Design work for the conversion to an education centre was undertaken by the architects Ted Cullinan and James Stirling and involved the addition of a new classroom wing built from glass-reinforced plastic. In 1997 it became a conference centre, run by the De Vere hotel group, and was acquired by Jamia Ahmadiyya UK in 2012.

== Places of worship ==
=== St Bartholomew's Church ===
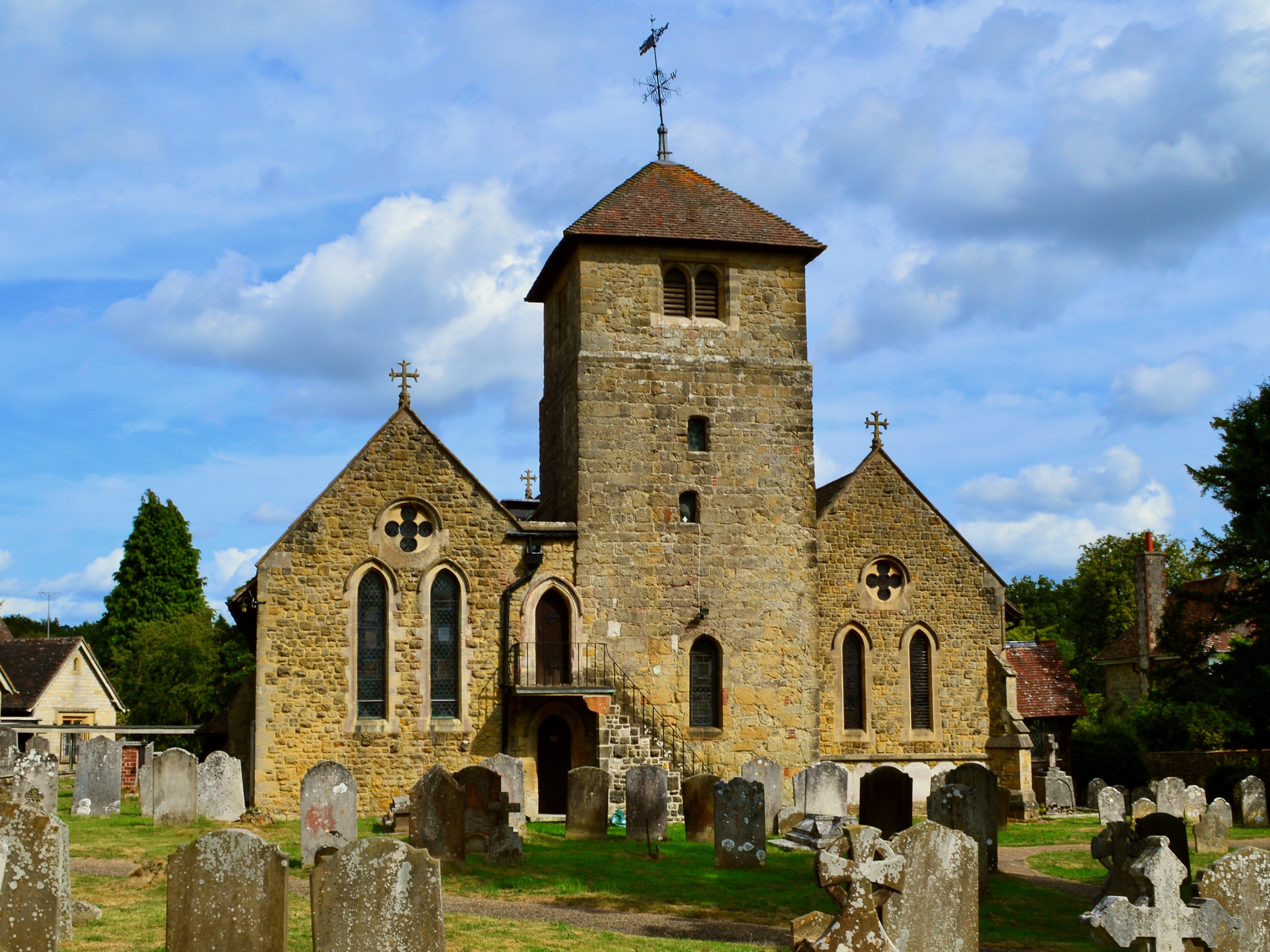
St Bartholomew's Church

St Bartholomew's Church is thought to have been founded as a chapel in the 13th century, and the square tower at the west end is thought to date from this period. The remainder of the building dates from a reconstruction by John Penfold in 1871. (Note: Following its reconstruction, St Bartholomew 's Church was consecrated on 28 July 1871 by Samuel Wilberforce, Bishop of Winchester.) The west window of the north aisle is thought to incorporate 17th-century Flemish glass panels and the Holy Grail is illustrated in the Tennyson memorial window, designed by Edward Burne-Jones. The polychromatic marble font dates to 1870 and the organ case incorporates a c. 1900 Morris & Co. tapestry. The wooden pulpit, which features linenfold panelling, dates from the late 19th or early 20th century.

=== St Stephen's Church, Shottermill ===
St Stephen's Church was originally built in 1841 as a chapel in the parish of Frensham. The tower was completed in 1846 and the building was consecrated the same year. The chancel was designed by John Penfold c. 1875 and the Lady chapel was added in 1909–10. As part of a renovation undertaken in 2005–06, underfloor heating and a baptismal pool were installed.

=== All Saints' Church, Grayswood ===
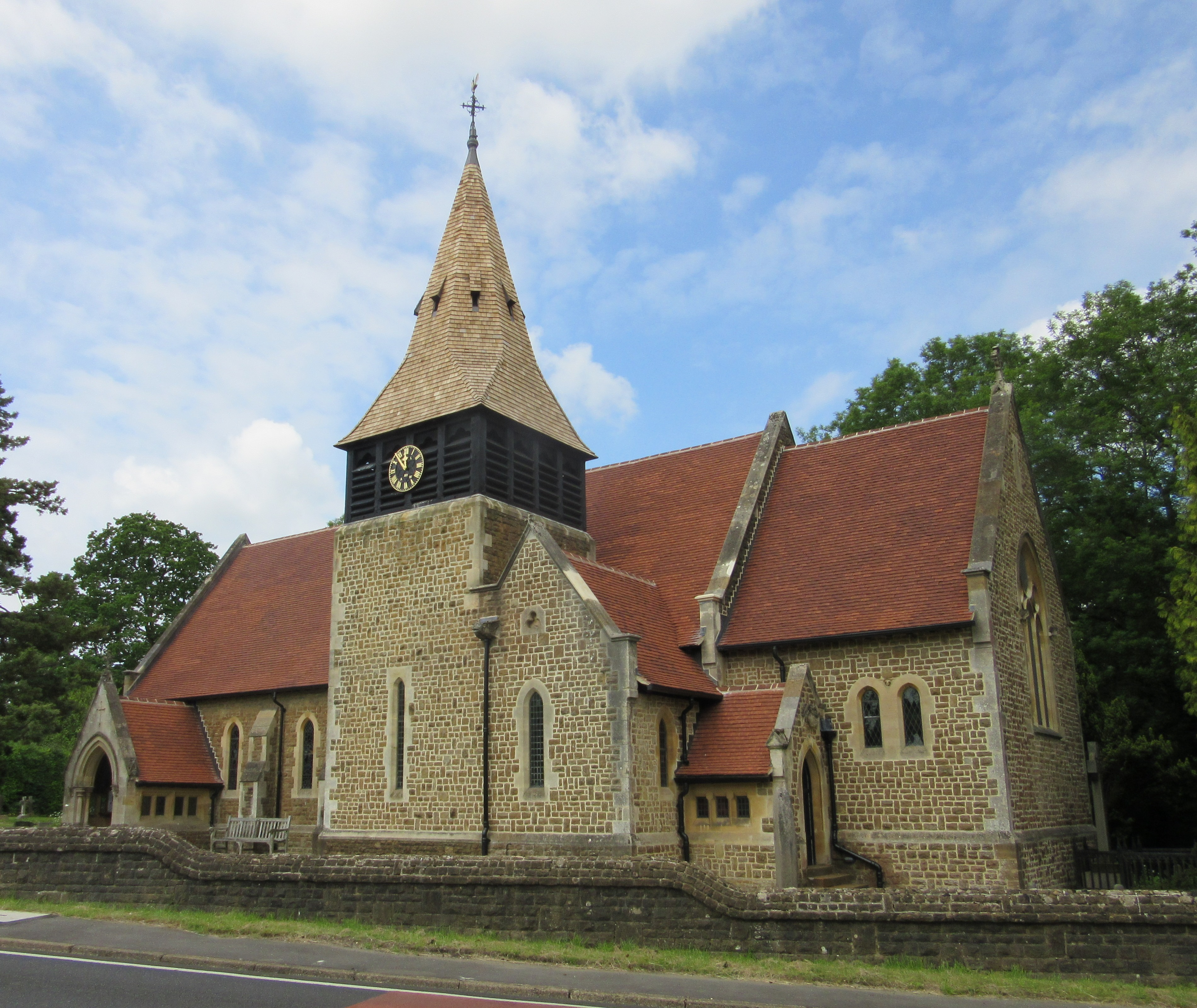
All Saints' Church

The ecclesiastical parish of Grayswood was formed in 1901 from parts of the parishes of Witley, Chiddingfold, Haslemere and Thursley. Alfred Hugh Harman, a local resident, agreed to finance the construction of a church on condition that a new parish was created. (Note: The land on which the church was built was given by Lord Derby.) All Saints' Church was designed by the Swedish architect, Axel Haig, in a 13th-century style, influenced by the Arts and Crafts movement. The building was completed in 1902 and is constructed of Bargate stone rubble with freestone dressings. The tower has a timber-framed belfry and is topped by a shingled spire. The interior includes an embroidery of the Annunciation, thought to be original, and paintings of Moses and David on linen, attributed to Carl Almquist. In the churchyard is a granite memorial stone to Axel Haig, carved in the shape of a Viking sail, which bears a relief of a longship.

=== St Christopher's Church ===
St Christopher's Church was constructed between 1902 and 1904 in the Free Late-Gothic style. It is built from coursed Bargate stone rubble with ironstone galleting. The square tower at the south west corner is topped with a chequerboard decoration, which is also featured on the west gable end. The east window was designed in 1928 in the style of Christopher Whall and the north chapel added in 1935. Between the chancel and nave is a hanging icon of the crucifixion, installed in 1950 in memory of the curate, Christopher Tanner.

=== Church of Our Lady of Lourdes ===
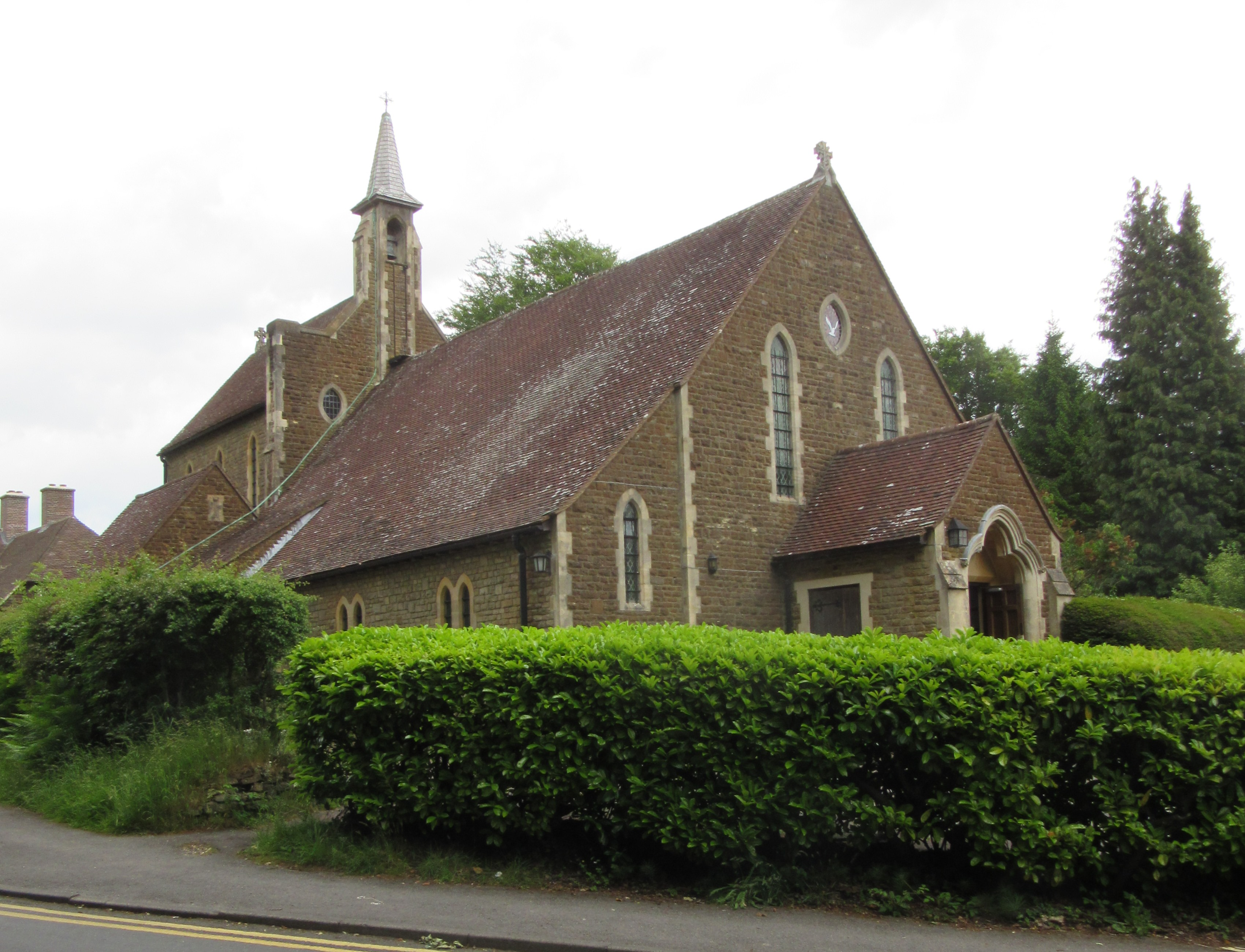
Church of Our Lady of Lourdes

The Catholic congregation in Haslemere traces its origins to 1908, when Franciscans from Chilworth Friary began to hold regular Masses at Oaklands Hotel. In 1923, the services relocated to the High Street and a year later, the new church was completed. Our Lady of Lourdes was consecrated in 1932 and stained glass windows, designed by Geoffrey Fuller Webb, were installed between 1935 and 1937.

== Culture ==
=== Art ===
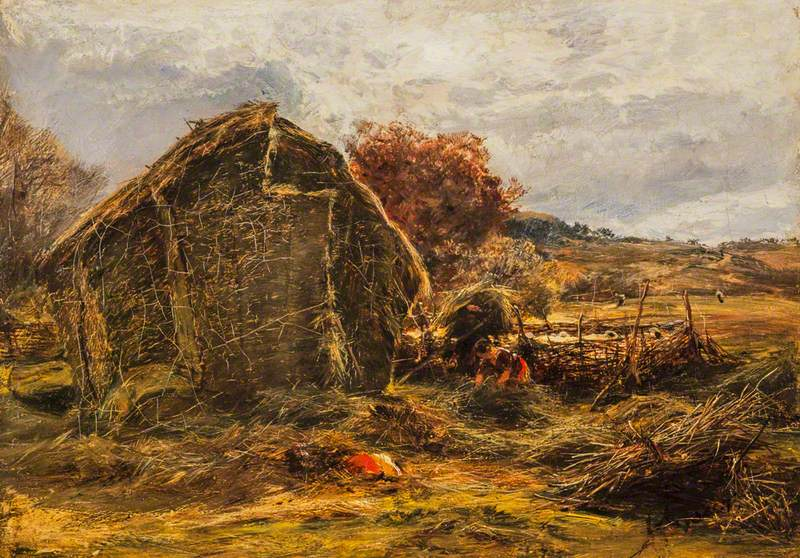
A Sheepfold, Haslemere (c. 1868) by Alexander Fraser (Note: A Sheepfold, Haslemere by Alexander Fraser (1827-1899) is held by the Scottish National Gallery.)

Several artists have painted landscapes of the Haslemere area, including George Shalders (c. 1826–1873), Alexander Fraser (1827–1899), George Vicat Cole (1833–1893) and Cecil Gordon Lawson (1849–1882). The Haslemere Educational Museum holds several artworks, including a bust of Alfred, Lord Tennyson by Thomas Woolner (1825–1892), portraits by Frank Dicksee (1853–1928) and Vera Cummings (1891–1940), as well as several carved wooden figures from the Yoruba School of Nigeria.

Among the works of public art in the town, is a bust of Elizabeth I by Malcolm Stathers, which commemorates the charter issued to Haslemere by the queen. In 2019, a series of four sculptures was commissioned from the artist, Andrew Brighty. The works are inspired by the Arts and Crafts movement and are intended to form part of an arts trail around the town. The first two works, in the High Street and at Clements Corner, were installed in 2020 and are entitled Progress and Mimesis respectively. The third sculpture, Serenade to the Sky, celebrates the area's musical connections and was unveiled near Lion Green in March 2021.

=== Music ===
The musician and instrument maker, Arnold Dolmetsch, was born in France in 1858 and moved with his son, Carl Dolmetsch to Haslemere in 1919. The family repopularised the recorder and began the revival of other early musical instruments. In 1925, they launched the Haslemere Festival, which later became the annual International Dolmetsch Early Music Festival. From 1997 to 2018, the director of the festival was Carl Dolmetsch's daughter, Jeanne-Marie Dolmetsch.

Founded as the Haslemere Orchestral Society in 1923, the Haslemere Musical Society acquired its current name in 1939. Among its former conductors are Anthony Bernard, the founder of the London Chamber Orchestra, the composer John Gardner and John Lubbock, founder of the Orchestra of St John's Smith Square. In 2007, the society commissioned the choral work Lord of All Creation by outgoing conductor, Darrell Davison. The current conductor is James Ross. The society gives regular concerts in the local area and holds an annual "come and sing" event.

Haslemere Town Band was officially founded in 1837 following the amalgamation of two small bands which had started in 1834.

=== Haslemere Players ===
The Haslemere Players is an amateur dramatics society and musical theatre group, based in the town. It was officially founded in 1905, but a group had been staging regular performances since the 1890s.

=== Haslemere Charter Fair ===
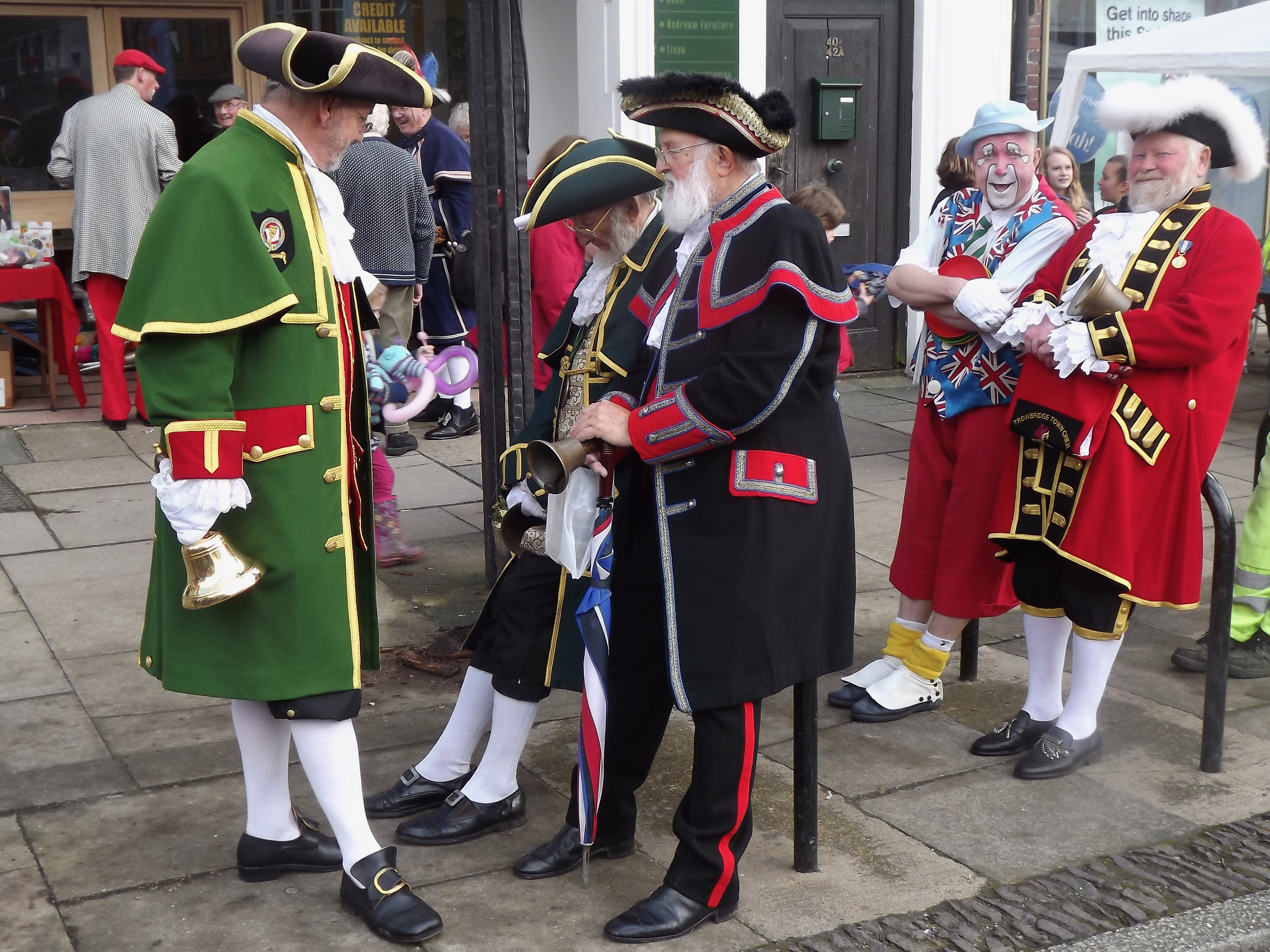
Town criers at the 2012 Charter Fair

Permission to hold an annual fair in the town was first granted by Richard II in 1397 and was confirmed by Elizabeth I in the charter of 1596. The fair was revived in 1984 and is held on the early May bank holiday every two years. The event takes place on the High Street and on West Street, which are closed to traffic for the day. A competition for town criers is held as part of the fair and the winner is awarded the Tennyson Trophy.

== Sport ==
=== Leisure centres ===
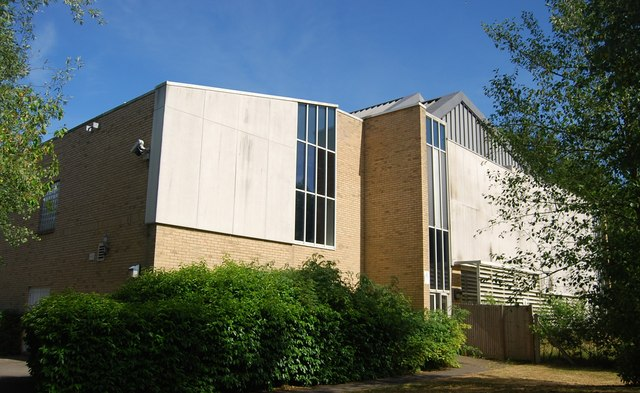
Haslemere Leisure Centre, 2010

Haslemere Leisure Centre, on the King's Road, was opened in 1998–99. (Note: The leisure centre was built on the infilled former millpond of the Sickle Mill.) The construction was funded by the sale of Shottermill Recreation Ground, which had been owned by Waverley Borough Council since 1974. (Note: The Shottermill Recreation Ground was sold to Shottermill Parish Council in 1909 and passed to the Haslemere UDC in 1933. A swimming pool was built on the site in 1950. The area is now occupied by the Tesco supermarket.) The centre underwent a £3.8M refurbishment 2014–15, which included the upgrade of the fitness gym facilities and the addition of dance and cycling studios. The centre is managed by Places Leisure, on behalf of the borough council.

The Edge Leisure Centre is on Woolmer Hill Road. The centre has an indoor dance studio and fitness suite, outdoor pitches for sports including football and rugby, as well as an athletics track. A new artificial hockey pitch was installed at the centre in 2018.

=== Association Football ===
Shottermill & Haslemere Football Club was founded in 2001 as an amalgamation of two existing clubs. The club plays its home games at Haslemere Recreation Ground and has been a member of the Surrey County Intermediate League (Western) since 2006.

=== Cricket ===
Haslemere Cricket Club was founded in 1827 and originally played its home games at a field near the High Street. The club moved to Haste Hill in 1850 and then to Lythe Hill in 1868. Since 1922, the club has played at Haslemere Recreation Ground on Scotland Lane.

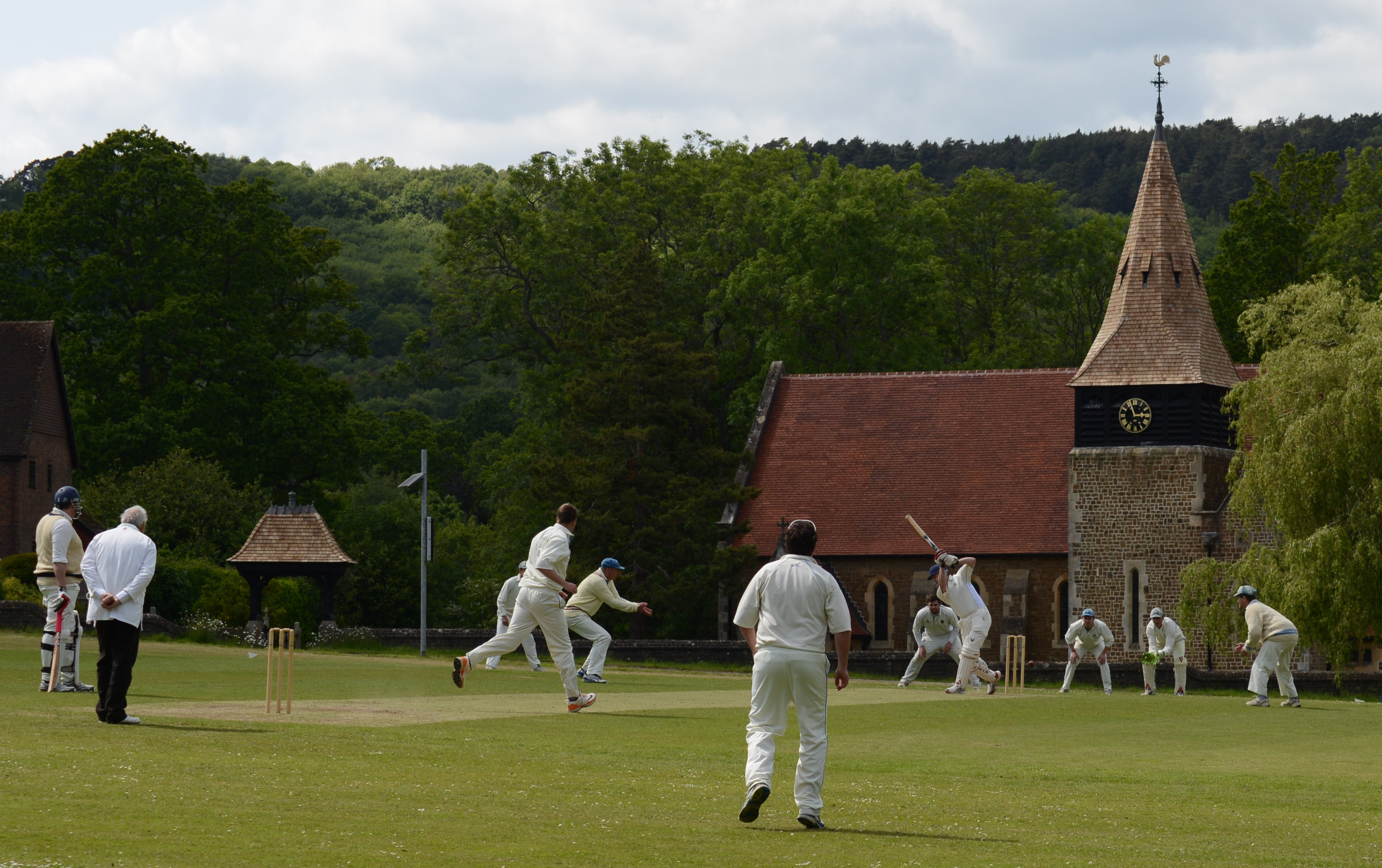
Grayswood cricket, 2015

Cricket has been played on the village green at Grayswood since the early 20th century and there have been at least three incarnations of the local club. The current Grayswood Cricket Club was reformed in 1989 and has been a member of the I'Anson League since the 1997 season. (Note: A previous incarnation of Grayswood Cricket Club played in the I'Anson League between 1925 and 1930 and finished as runners up in 1926.) In 2017, the club were league champions for the third time, having previously won the title in 2012 and 2013.

=== Hockey ===
Haslemere Hockey Club was founded in 1946 and plays its home games at Woolmer Hill Sports Ground, which has two AstroTurf pitches.

=== Rugby ===
Haslemere Community Rugby Club was founded in 1950 and was initially sponsored by Harlequins. At first, it played its home games at Haslemere Recreation Ground on Scotland Lane, but later moved to its current base at the Woolmer Hill Sports Ground.

== Notable buildings and landmarks ==
=== Community centres ===
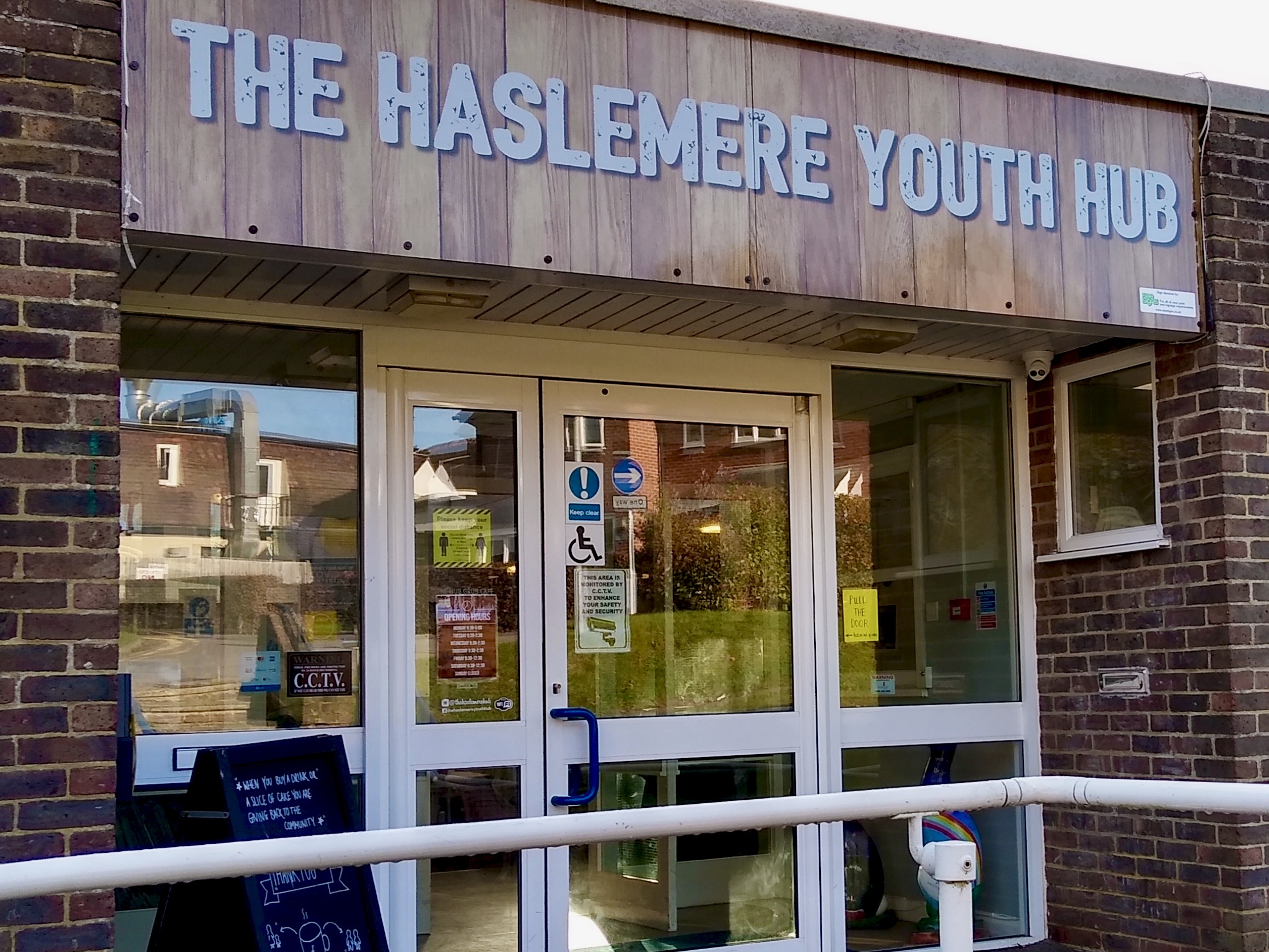
Haslemere Youth Hub

Grayswood Village Club was founded in 1905 as a reading room and social space for local residents. The building dates from 1862, when it was constructed as a National school. It was also used as a place of worship from 1884 until the opening of All Saints' Church in 1902. By 1905, the school had outgrown the premises and moved to a new site. The vacated building was purchased by Frederick Albert Robers and was placed in trust for the village community.

The Haslewey Centre, on Lion Green, has been run as a local community centre by an independent charity since 2003. The centre has been a distribution point for the Meals on Wheels service, run by Waverley Borough Council, since January 2017 and has housed the town post office since January 2018.

The Haslemere Youth Hub, on St Christopher's Road, was relaunched in 2019 by Waverley Borough Council. Previously known as the Wey Centre, it had been managed by Surrey County Council. The hub provides a safe space for young people to meet, six days a week, and offers a wide range of activities. The hub houses a counselling service for children as well as a café.

High Lane Community Centre is on Weycombe Road, to the north of the town centre.

=== Haslemere Hall ===
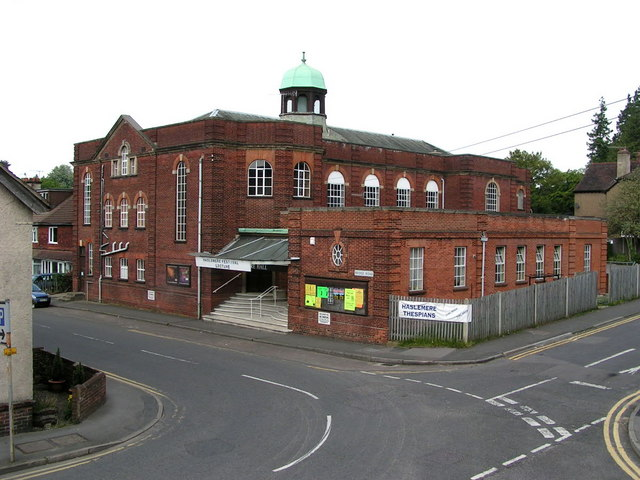
Haslemere Hall

Haslemere Hall, on Bridge Road, is a theatre, cinema and music venue. It opened in January 1914 and its design, by the architect Annesley Brownrigg, was influenced by the Arts and Crafts Movement. During the First World War, it was used as a drill hall.

=== Haslemere Educational Museum ===
Haslemere Educational Museum was founded in 1888 by the surgeon, Jonathan Hutchinson, who was an amateur collector of biological, geological and anthropological specimens. Initially the museum was located at Hutchinson's Haslemere home, Inval, but moved to its current location on the High Street in 1926. In the same year, it acquired a collection of European Folk Art from the Peasant Arts Museum, which had been located in the town.

=== Replica Penfold pillar box ===
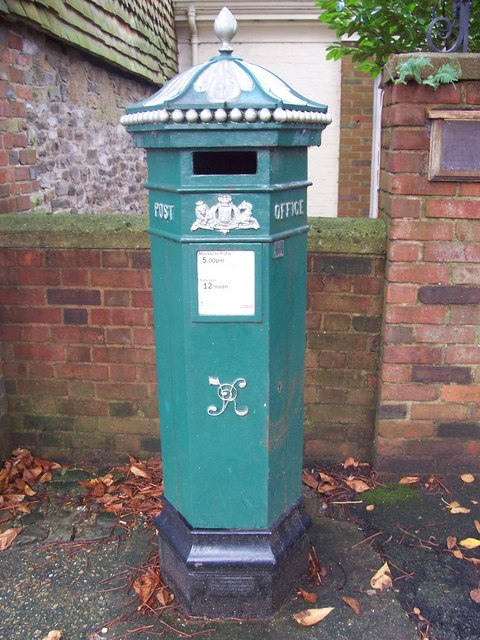
Penfold pillar box

A replica Victorian pillar box was installed outside the Georgian Hotel on the High Street in July 1992. It is an exact copy of a "Penfold box" which was the standard design used by the Post Office from 1866 to 1879. It honours the local architect, John Penfold, who was responsible for its design.

=== Town Hall ===
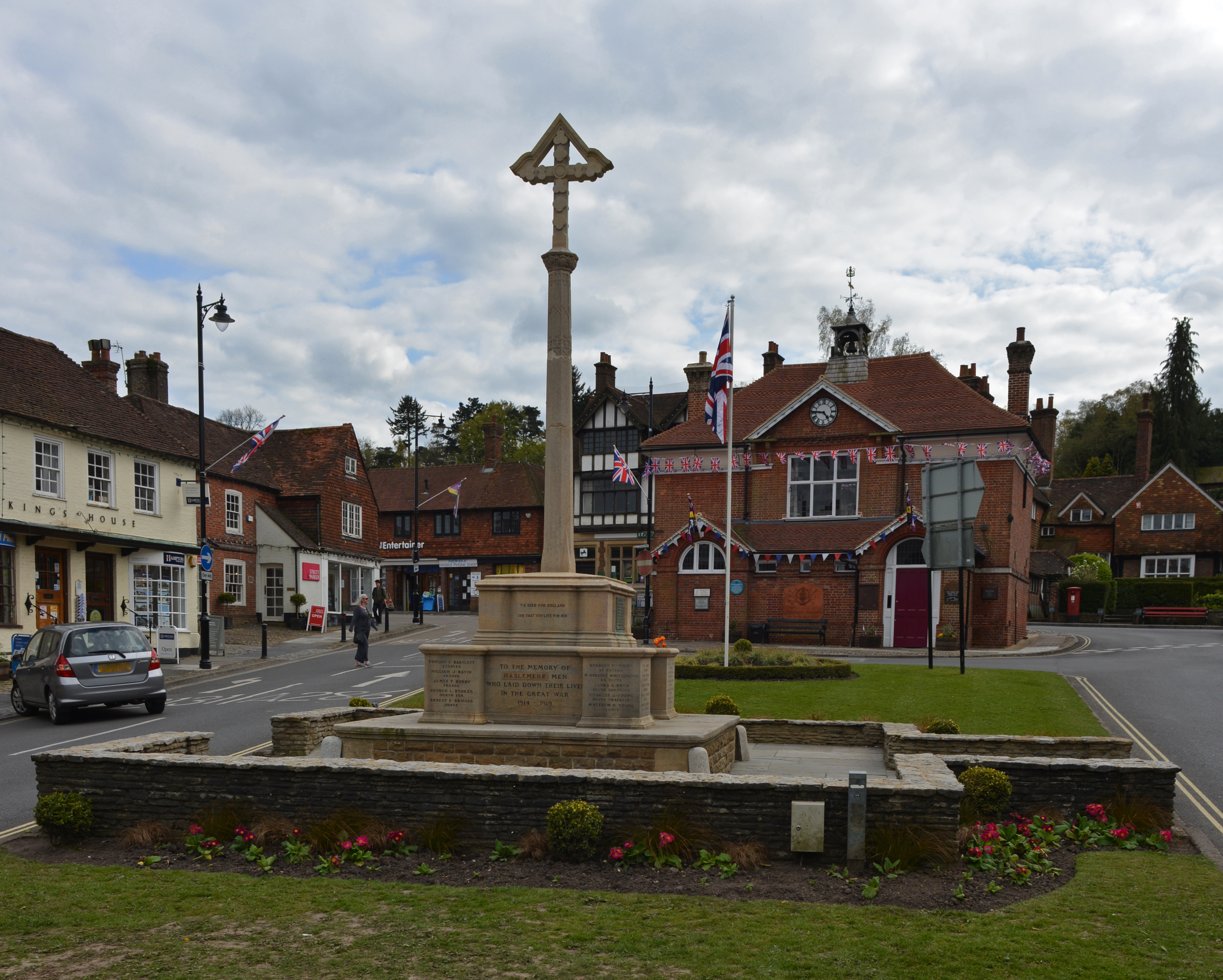
Haslemere Town Hall and war memorial

Haslemere Town Hall, at the south end of the High Street, was constructed in 1814. Originally a market house, it replaced an older wooden building, that had stood immediately to the north. It was transferred to the Parish Council in 1897 and the upper floor was used as the debating chamber until 1926, when the UDC moved to the former museum building.

=== War memorials ===
The limestone war memorial in Haslemere High Street, was designed by Inigo Triggs in 1920–21. It takes the form of a gabled stone cross, supported on an octagonal column, which in turn rests on a stepped stone base. It commemorates 62 local residents who died in WWI, whose names are inscribed on the plinth. The surnames of 47 people who died in the WWII are listed on bronze plaques. A restoration project, undertaken in 2018, included the repair and replacement of damaged stonework and was partly funded by the War Memorials Trust.

The Grayswood war memorial is to the south of the village, on the west side of the A286. It takes the form of a freestanding stone cross and the base is inscribed with the words "Peace to those who died that we might live". It commemorates 19 local residents who died in WWI and three residents who died in WWII.

== Parks and open spaces ==
=== Grayswood ===
The National Trust owns a 4.17 ha (10.3-acre) area of mature oak and yew woodland between Grayswood village and Haslemere.

=== Grayswood Common, St George's Wood ===
Grayswood Common and St George's Wood are located between Grayswood village and Haslemere and have a combined area of 16.43 ha (40.6 acres). They were acquired by the Urban District Council (UDC) in 1953 and are now owned by Waverley Borough Council.

=== Haste Hill ===
Haste Hill is a 12.25 ha (30-acre) woodland to the south east of the town, owned by Waverley Borough Council. There was a tenement on the hill in the 14th century and it may have been the site of the original settlement of Haslemere. In the early 18th century, an optical telegraph station, part of the Admiralty Semaphore line between London and Portsmouth was constructed on Haste Hill. It operated from 1822 until 1847, when it was superseded by an electrical telegraph line between the two cities.

=== Lion Green ===
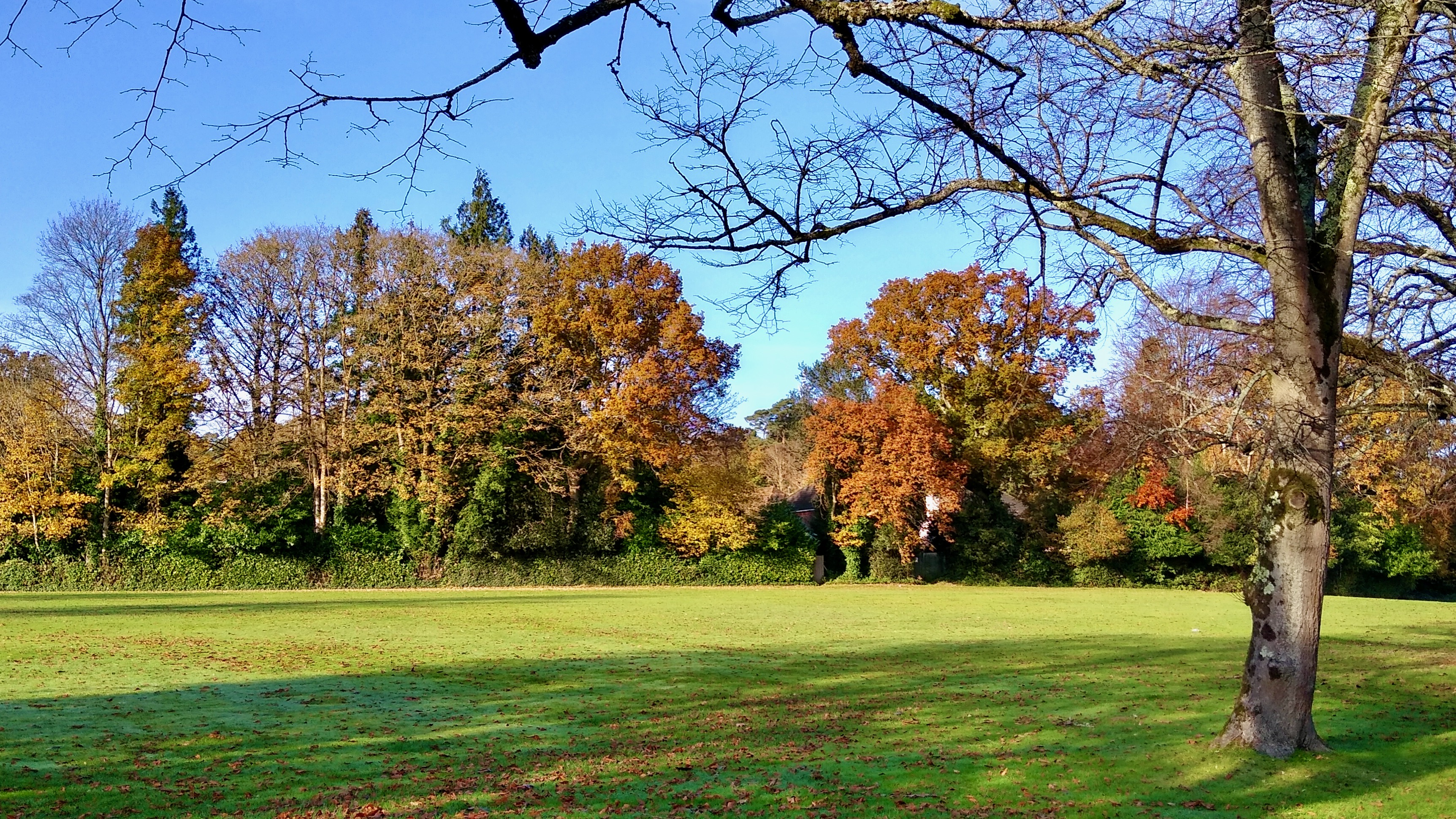
Lion Green

Lion Green was designated a recreation ground and open space in the Inclosure Act 1845. The green is used for several community events including the annual Haslemere Classic Car Festival and the biennial Haslemere Fringe Festival.

=== Recreation ground ===
The 3.44 ha (8.5-acre) recreation ground adjoins Scotland Lane and Old Haslemere Road. The land was purchased in 1921 by the War Memorial Committee, using surplus funds donated for the construction of the memorial in the High Street. It was presented to the UDC in the same year, in memory of those who had died in the First World War. In 2015, the recreation ground was legally protected by the charity, Fields in Trust, and was designated a Queen Elizabeth II field.

=== Swan Barn Farm ===
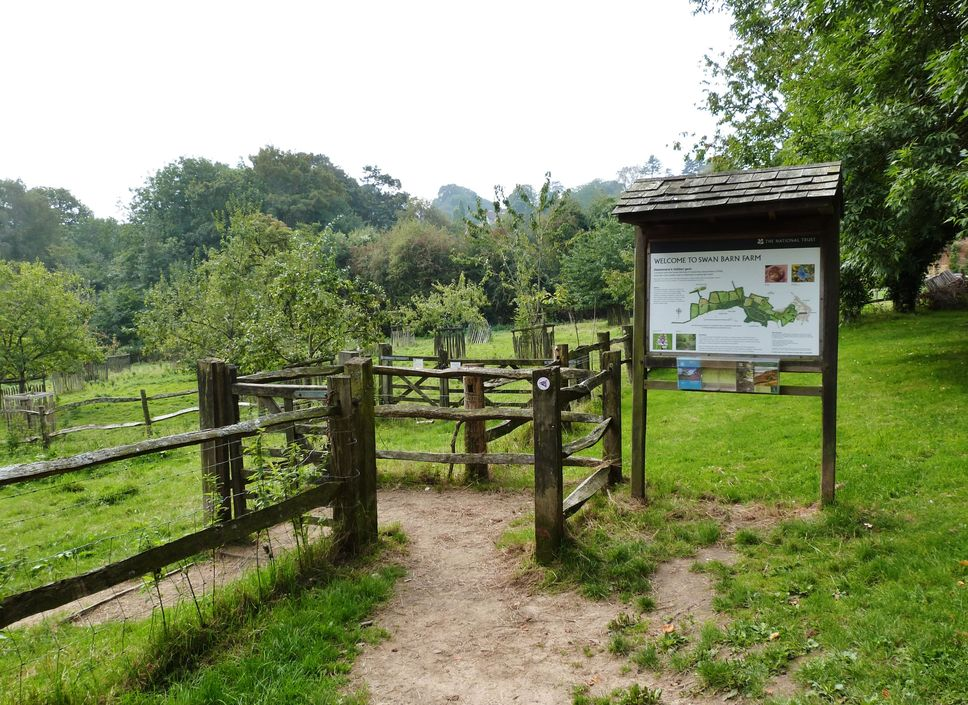
Entrance to Swan Barn Farm

Swan Barn Farm, owned by the National Trust, is an area of grassland and ancient woodland to the east of Haslemere High Street. The 28 ha (69-acre) property includes two orchards and is run as a smallholding. Areas of pasture are mown for haymaking and are also grazed by Belted Galloway cattle. The Hunter Base Camp, which provides accommodation for long-term volunteers working on Blackdown, is part of the farm.

== Notable people ==
- John Boxall (d. 1571) – Secretary of State to Mary I, owned Burgage House (now the Haslemere Educational Museum)
- James Oglethorpe (1696–1785) – founded the Colony of Georgia, was MP for Haslemere (1722–1754) and lived at Town House on the High Street
- Josiah Wood Whymper (1813–1903) – artist, lived at Town House, High Street, Haslemere from 1859 until his death
- George Bowdler Buckton (1818–1905) – chemist and entomologist, designed his own house on Weycombe Road, where he lived from 1865
- George Eliot (1819–1880) – novelist and poet, wrote much of Middlemarch while living in Shottermill in the summer of 1871
- Sir Francis Galton (1822–1911), polymath, died in Haslemere
- George MacDonald (1824–1905), Scottish writer, lived in St George's Wood, Haslemere, from 1900 until his death.
- Anne Gilchrist (1828–1885) – writer, lived in Shottermill from 1861 to 1871
- Jonathan Hutchinson (1828–1913) – surgeon, founded Haslemere Educational Museum
- John Penfold (1828–1909) – surveyor, architect and designer of a Post Office standard pillar box, lived at what was then called Courts Hill House
- Archibald Geikie (1834–1924) – geologist, retired to Haslemere in 1913
- Axel Haig (1835–1921) – artist, illustrator and architect, designed his own house on Highercombe Road, where he lived from 1865
- Robert Hunter (1844–1913) – co-founder of the National Trust, Chairman of the Haslemere Parish Council, lived at Meadfields Hanger
- Cecil Gordon Lawson (1849–1882) - landscape artist and illustrator, settled in Haslemere after his marriage and is buried here.
- William Cecil Marshall (1849–1921) – sportsman, designed his own house on Hindhead Road, where he lived from 1887
- Arnold Dolmetsch (1854–1940) and his son Carl Dolmetsch (1911–1997) – musicians and musical instrument makers, lived in Grayswood Road
- Walter Tyndale (1855–1943) – artist, lived in Haslemere from c. 1890. He commissioned the construction of Broad Dene, Hill Road, in 1900 and lived there until his death.
- Captain Cyril Edward Gourley (1893–1982) – Victoria Cross recipient, lived in Grayswood from 1952 until his death
- Margaret Hutchinson (1904–1997) – teacher, writer and naturalist; lived and worked in Haslemere
- Robert Lochner (1904–1956) – inventor of the Bombardon Breakwater, used at Mulberry harbour, Normandy, on D-Day. He lived at Shottermill from 1939 until his death.
- W. H. C. Frend (1916–2005) – ecclesiastical historian, archaeologist, and Anglican priest, was born at Shottermill Vicarage and lived in the village as a child
- Robin Phillips (1940–2015) – actor and director, was born in Haslemere
- Rachel Portman (b. 1960) – composer, was born in Haslemere

== Bibliography ==
- Bathurst, David (2012). Walking the county high points of England. Chichester: Summersdale. ISBN 978-1-84-953239-6.
- Brodie, Antonia (2001). Directory of British Architects 1834-1914: L-Z. Continuum International Publishing Group. ISBN 978-0-8264-4963-4.
- Chandler, Allen (1973) [1965]. Heretofore in Haslemere. Haslemere: Blackdown Bookshop. ISBN 978-0-90-017201-4.
- Crocker, Glenys (1999). Surrey's Industrial Past (PDF). Guildford: Surrey Industrial History Group. ISBN 978-0-95-239188-3. Archived from the original (PDF) on 3 February 2021.
- Crook, J. Mordaunt; Lennox-Boyd, C. A. (1984). Axel Haig and the Victorian vision of the Middle Ages. London: Allen & Unwin. ISBN 978-0-04-720029-8.
- Gliddon, Gerald (2012) [2004]. VCs of the First World War: Cambrai 1917 (2nd ed.). Sutton Publishing. ISBN 978-0-75-247668-1.
- Gover, J. E. B.; Mawer, A.; Stenton, F. M. (1969). The place-names of Surrey. Cambridge: Cambridge University Press.
- Hein, Rolland; Buechner, Frederick (2014). George MacDonald: Victorian Mythmaker. Eugene: Wipf and Stock Publishers. ISBN 978-1-62-564507-4.
- Jessel, Katharine (2007). St Bartholomew's Parish Church, Haslemere: A short History, 1180 to the present day. Haslemere: The Friends of the Parish of Haslemere.
- Kümin, Beat A (1996). The shaping of a community : the rise and reformation of the English parish, c. 1400-1560. Aldershot: Scholar. ISBN 978-1-85-928164-2.
- Malden, H.E., ed. (1911). A History of the County of Surrey. Vol. 3. London: Victoria County History. Archived from the original on 28 January 2021.
- Mitchell, Vic; Smith, Keith (2006) [1985]. Woking to Portsmouth. 3rd reprint. Midhurst: Middleton Press. ISBN 978-0-90-652025-3.
- Pooley, Beryl, ed. (1987). The changing face of Shottermill. Acorn Press.
- Rolston, GR (1978a) [1956]. Haslemere in History. Haslemere. Vol. I. Chichester: Phillimore. ISBN 0-85033-309-1.
- Rolston, GR (1978b) [1964]. Haslemere 1850-1950. Haslemere. Vol. II. Chichester: Phillimore. ISBN 0-85033-309-1.
- Swanton, Ernest W.; Woods, P., eds. (1914). Bygone Haslemere: A short history of the ancient borough and its immediate neighbourhood from earliest times. London: West, Newman & Co.
- Thurrell, R. G.; Worssam, B. C.; Edmunds, F. H. (1968). The geology of the country around Haslemere : Explanation of one-inch geological sheet 301, new series. Archived from the original on 9 September 2021.
- Turner, Greta A. (2004). Early times to the 1700s. Shottermill: Its farms, families and mills. Vol. 1. Headley, Hampshire: John Owen Smith. ISBN 978-1-87-385539-3.
- Turner, Greta A. (2005). 1730 to the early 20th century. Shottermill: Its farms, families and mills. Vol. 2. Headley, Hampshire: John Owen Smith. ISBN 978-1-87-385540-9.
- Williams, R.A. (1968). The Formative Years. The London & South Western Railway. Vol. I. Newton Abbot: David and Charles. ISBN 978-0-71-534188-9.
- Williams, R.A. (1973). Growth and Consolidation. The London & South Western Railway. Vol. II. Newton Abbot: David and Charles. ISBN 978-0-71-535940-2.
- Winter, Tim (2002). Around Haslemere. Images of England. Stroud: Tempus. ISBN 978-0-75-242481-1.
- Wragg, David (2013). The Southern Railway Story. Stroud: The History Press. ISBN 978-0-75-248804-2.
