= HMS Mercury (shore establishment) =

Royal Navy school (1941–1993)

Coordinates: 50°58.03′N 1°02.04′W

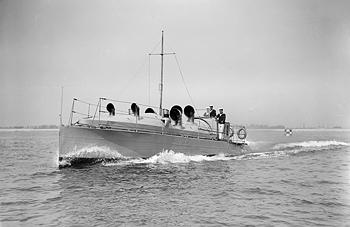
- The motor launch assigned to HMS Mercury II underway during the Second World War

History

United Kingdom
- Name: HMS Mercury
- Commissioned: 16 August 1941
- Decommissioned: 31 August 1993
- Fate: Decommissioned and operational elements dispersed

General characteristics
- Class & type: Stone frigate

HMS Mercury was a shore establishment of the Royal Navy, and the site of the Royal Navy Signals School and Combined Signals School. There was also a subsidiary branch, HMS Mercury II.

== Establishment and history ==
The school was established at Leydene House, East Meon, near Petersfield, Hampshire, England and was commissioned as HMS Mercury on 16 August 1941 under the command of Captain Gerald Warner. A signalling school had been established at HM Barracks, Portsmouth in 1904 and was transferred to Petersfield during the Second World War. Extensions were also established at a number of other sites, including Bristol, Cambridge and Liss. In November 1943 a wireless telegraphy school was established at St. Bede's Prep School, Eastbourne, and a WRNS training establishment at Soberton Towers. The base went on to house both the Communications and Navigations faculties of the Royal Navy's School of Maritime Operations (SMOPS). The school trained generations of Royal Navy Communicators and Navigators until 31 August 1993 when the establishment was decommissioned. At the time of its closure, HMS Mercury was home to the Communications and Navigations Faculties of the Royal Navy's School of Maritime Operations and the Special Communications Unit (SCU), Leydene. SCU, Leydene became an independent establishment on 1 September 1995.

During its time in operation, HMS Mercury had three nominated depot ships, MB 3520 from 16 August 1941, HL(D) 1854 from 1948 until June 1950, and HL(D) 42473 from June 1950 until her sale on 18 June 1959.

== HMS Mercury II ==
An experimental section of the Signal School and an Admiralty Signal Establishment had existed since 1917, when the task was devolved from HMS Vernon. It had moved to Eastney to study Radar direction finding, with appointments being made there from 30 December 1935, but the apparatus not arriving until 14 July 1936. With the moving of the main signal school to Leydene House the Admiralty Signal Establishment also moved, in April 1941, and was established in Lythe Hill House, Haslemere. The Production department had been set up in Whitwell Hatch Hotel at Haste Hill, Haslemere by the end of May that year, with a small part of the establishment remaining at the old Signal School in Portsmouth. This became independent in August when the main facility moved. Soon after the opening of the main centre of HMS Mercury, the Experimental Section in Lythe Hill House and the Production and Development Section at Whitwell House were commissioned as HMS Mercury on 25 August 1941, and opened as an independent command on 27 August. Later developments saw the establishment of laboratories and workshops at King Edward's School, Witley, valve production going to Waterlooville and aerial manufacture to Nutbourne. Trials were carried out at Tantallon, near North Berwick.

During its time in operation, HMS Mercury II had two nominated depot ships, FMB 3521 from 27 August 1941 until July 1946, and MFV 1016 from July 1946 until she was sold in May 1947. This HMS Mercury II remained in operation until mid 1952. The name then passed to the Admiralty Signal and Radar Establishment in Portsdown, Portsmouth. This base remained HMS Mercury II until 1969.
