= Haslemere Town Hall =

Municipal building in Haslemere, Surrey, England

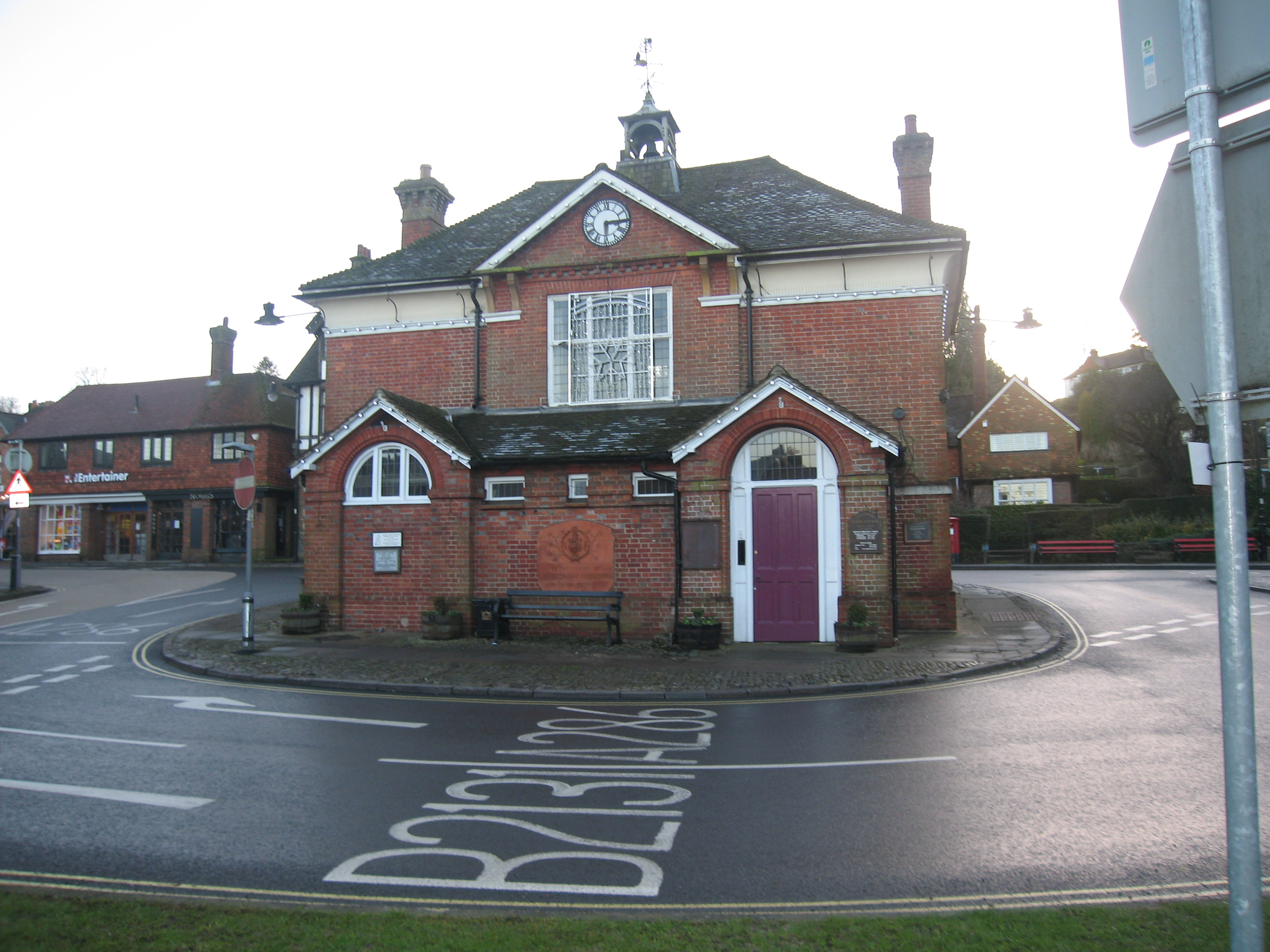
- Haslemere Town Hall

- Shown in Surrey
- 51.0876°N 0.7095°W
- Location: High Street, Haslemere

History
- Built: 1814

Site notes
- Architectural style: Neoclassical style

Listed Building – Grade II
- Official name: The Town Hall
- Designated: 19 September 1977
- Reference no.: 1244092

Haslemere Town Hall is a municipal building in the High Street, Haslemere, Surrey, England. The structure, which serves as the meeting place of Haslemere Town Council, is a Grade II listed building.

== History ==
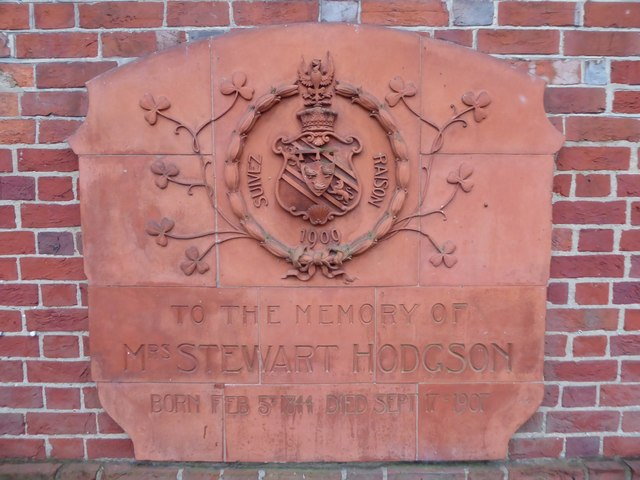
The memorial to Gertrude Agatha Stewart Hodgson on the face of the town hall

The first town hall in the town was a medieval timber structure in the middle of the High Street which, having become ruinous, was the subject of a substantial programme of repairs in 1658. After the first town hall once again became decrepit in the early 19th century, the two local members of parliament, Robert Ward and Charles Long, offered to demolish it and to build a new structure slightly to the south of the original site.

The new building was designed in the neoclassical style, built in red brick and was completed in 1814. It was originally arcaded on the ground floor, so that markets could be held, with an assembly room on the first floor. The design involved a symmetrical main frontage with three bays facing north along the High Street; the central bay, which slightly projected forward, contained a large archway on the ground floor and featured a three-light casement window on the first floor flanked by brackets supporting a pediment with a clock in the tympanum. There was a central cupola containing a bell at roof level. Internally, there was a lock-up for petty criminals on the ground floor as well as the assembly room on the first floor.

Haslemere had a very small electorate and a dominant patron, William Lowther, 1st Earl of Lonsdale, which meant it was recognised by the UK Parliament as a rotten borough. Its right to elect members of parliament was removed by the Reform Act 1832.

On the night of 28/29 July 1855, Inspector William Donaldson arrested a drunken navvy who, with his friends, had been creating a disturbance in the High Street: after incarcerating the navvy in the lock-up in the town hall and then refusing to release him, Donaldson was beaten to death by the other navvies and four men were subsequently convicted of his manslaughter.

In 1870, the town hall was significantly altered: the ground floor was enclosed and the building was extended to the north with a single-storey section which featured a gabled Diocletian window to the left and a gabled doorway with a fanlight to the right. Following implementation of the Local Government Act 1894, Haslemere Parish Council was formed under the chairmanship of the civil servant, Robert Hunter, in 1895, and the new parish council acquired ownership of the town hall in 1897.

In the late 19th century, James Stewart Hodgson, who was a partner in Barings Bank and the local lord of the manor, financed various projects in the town. Stewart Hodgson died in 1899 and, after his wife, Gertrude Agatha Stewart Hodgson, had also died in 1907, a large terracotta plaque was erected on the front of the town hall to commemorate her life: as well as improvements to the town hall, the Stewart Hodgsons had financed the street lighting, the water supply and the fire service.

Following significant population growth, largely associated with the status of Haslemere as a market town, the area became an urban district with the town hall as its headquarters in 1913. The building ceased to be the local seat of government when the council relocated to new offices at No. 78 High Street in 1926. However, following the reorganisation of local government and the formation of Haslemere Town Council in 1974, the town hall became the main meeting place of the town council. A stained glass window, designed by the artist, Rachel Mulligan, and depicting the town's coat of arms, was installed in the council chamber in 2006.
