= Haste Hill =

Coordinates: 51.0822°N 0.7012°W

Haste Hill is a hill near Haslemere, Surrey in England which was probably the original settlement of the town of Haslemere. It was used as the site of a semaphore station in the nineteenth century.

Haste Hill is south-east of the present town of Haslemere and consists of 24 acres (97,000 m^{2}) of mixed woodland with a pond and has a viewpoint looking over the Weald to the northeast. In the 14th century, Haste Hill, also called East Hill, was the main settlement at Haslemere and there may have been a church as there were references on the site to "Churchliten field" and the "Old church-yard" of Haslemere.

An Admiralty Telegraph Station was built on Haste Hill in 1821 on part of some enclosures called Jackman's Fields. The building was of a bungalow style with the semaphore above the operating room and it was part of the semaphore line from London to Portsmouth from 1822 to 1847. The Admiralty sold the site in 1849 after the line closed, and the building underwent various additions and alterations. It is now the Whitwell Hatch Hotel.

The admiralty returned to the site during World War II when by the end of May 1941, the Royal Naval Signals School set up its production department at Whitwell Hatch Hotel. The site was commissioned as part of HMS Mercury on 25 August 1941.

Next station upwards	Admiralty Semaphore line 1822	Next station downwards
Bannicle Hill	Haste Hill	Holder Hill
