= George Shalders =

English watercolour painter

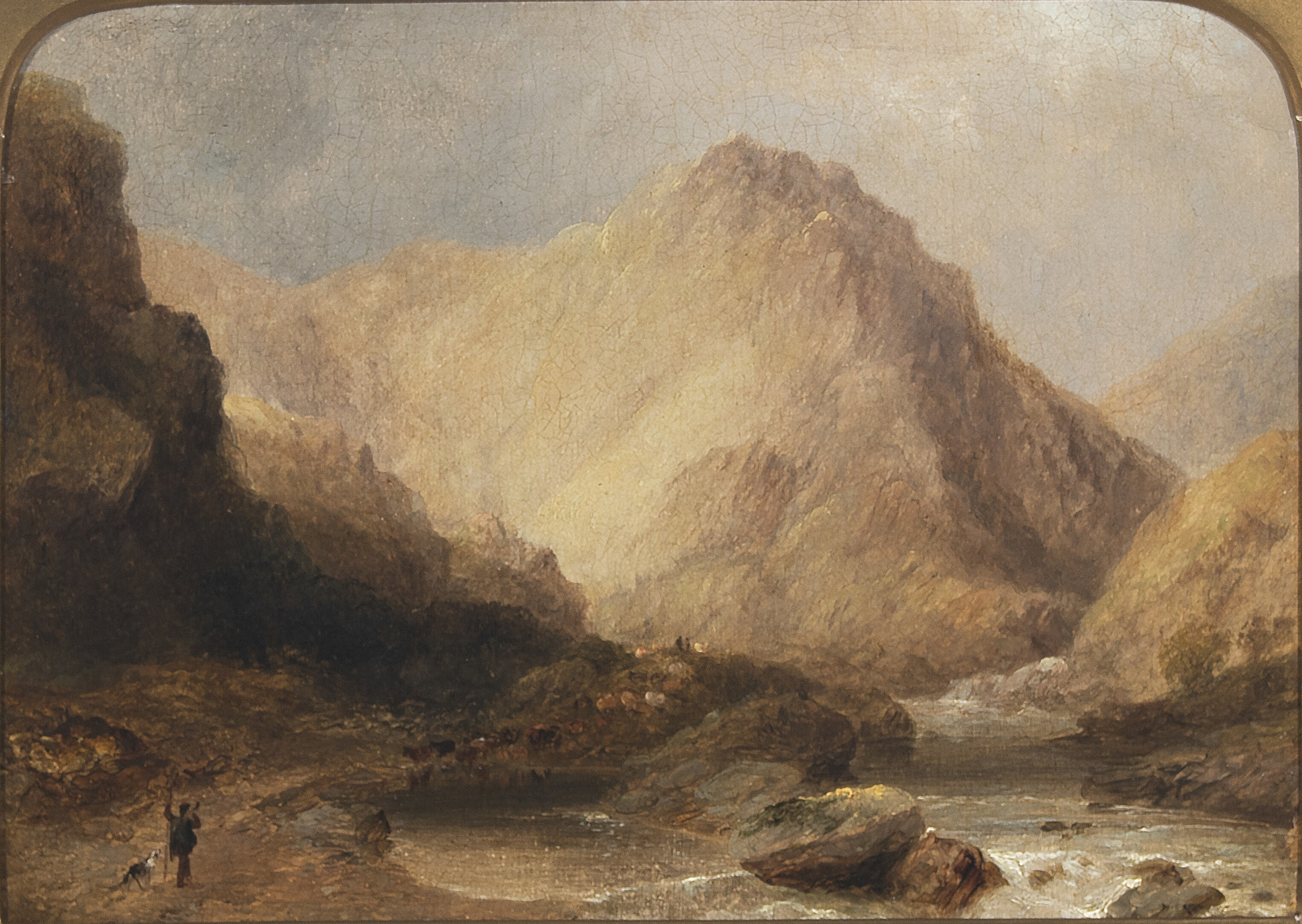
George Shalders: Mountain landscape

George Shalders (c. 1826 – 27 January 1873) was an English painter and watercolourist.

== Life and work ==
He hailed from Portsmouth and later settled in London, where he died. In his paintings, he mostly depicted Surrey and Hampshire, but he also paid visits to Ireland, notably Cork and Kerry. Around 1859–60, he visited Connemara, painting landscapes at the Twelve Bens, the mountainous terrain near Kylemore and the area around Clifden. His specialty was depicting sheep.

In 1863 he was elected an Associate, and in 1865, a member of the Institute of Painters in Water-Colours. In 1864, his debut at this institute's exhibitions was greeted by the Illustrated London News with the comment that it “would render him one of the most popular contributors to this gallery”. Shortly after, a commenter found that “sheep are folded and driven to field by Mr. Shalders with a truth and beauty which finds no rivals”. In 1867, the Illustrated London News saw Shalders “rapidly winning a place in the very front rank of living water-colour painters”.

He exhibited at the Royal Academy from 1848. Until 1862 he exhibited fifteen landscapes at the Royal Academy, four at the British Institution and forty-one in Suffolk Street.

== Death ==
Shalders died suddenly of paralysis (perhaps by overworking) and left three motherless children unprovided. Some of his artist friends raised a subscription for their support, and a collection of his pictures and sketches was sold at Christie's, in 1874, for their benefit.

== Galleries holding his work ==
Shalders is represented in the Nottingham Castle Museum and Art Gallery, Harris Museum & Art Gallery, Maidstone Museum & Bentlif Art Gallery, Walker Art Gallery, Beecroft Art Gallery and in the Rotherham Heritage Services.
