= Gibbet Hill, Hindhead =

Hill near Hindhead, Surrey, England

Gibbet Hill
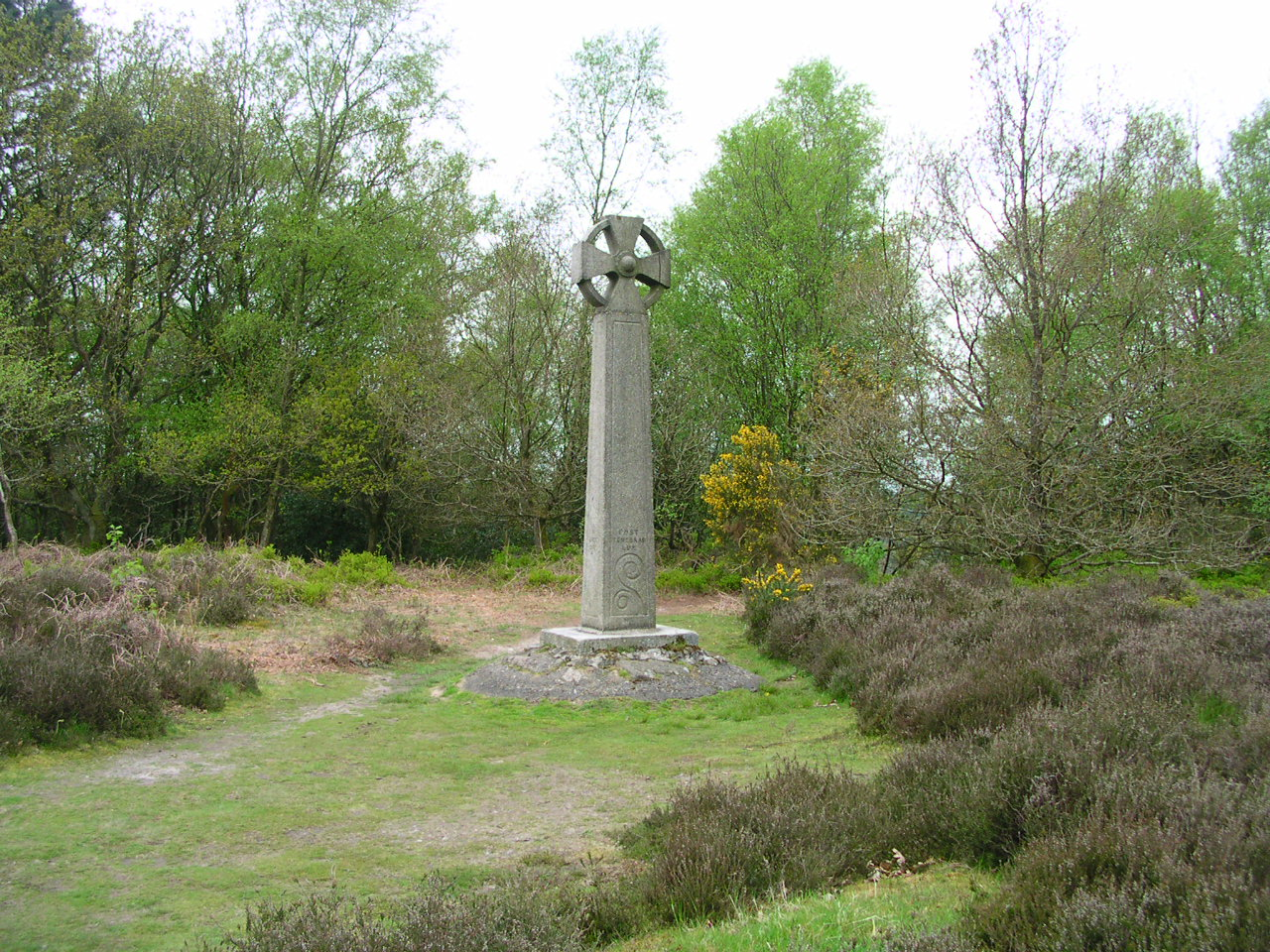
- The Celtic Cross

Highest point
- Elevation: 272 m (892 ft)
- Coordinates: 51°06′58″N 0°42′58″W

Geography
- Location within Surrey
- Location: Hindhead, Surrey, England
- Parent range: Greensand Ridge

Gibbet Hill, at Hindhead, Surrey, England, is the apex of the scarp surrounding the Devil's Punch Bowl, not far from the A3 London to Portsmouth road. The road used to follow the lower contours of the hill, but it has been diverted through the Hindhead Tunnel and the earlier route returned to nature.

== Geography ==
Gibbet Hill stands 272 metres (892 ft) above sea level. It is the second highest hill in Surrey. Leith Hill stands 23 metres taller and Botley Hill is 2.4 metres lower.

The summit of Gibbet Hill commands a panoramic view, especially to the north and east. The view to the north overlooks the Devil's Punchbowl, Thursley, Hankley Common, Crooksbury Hill, and the Hog's Back towards Godalming and Guildford. To the east lies the Sussex Weald. To the south, the hills of Haslemere and Blackdown can be seen, with some sections of the South Downs. On a clear day it is possible to see the skyline of London, some 40 miles (64 km) away, including buildings such as The Gherkin, Tower 42 and Wembley Stadium, and intermediate landmarks in Woking and Guildford, notably Guildford Cathedral. A trig point stands on the summit.

Weydown common lies to the south of Gibbet Hill. From 1909 or earlier until 1939 or later, a white horse was carved into the hillside at Combe Head, so that it could be seen from Gibbet Hill, although the figure is now covered by heath.

== History ==
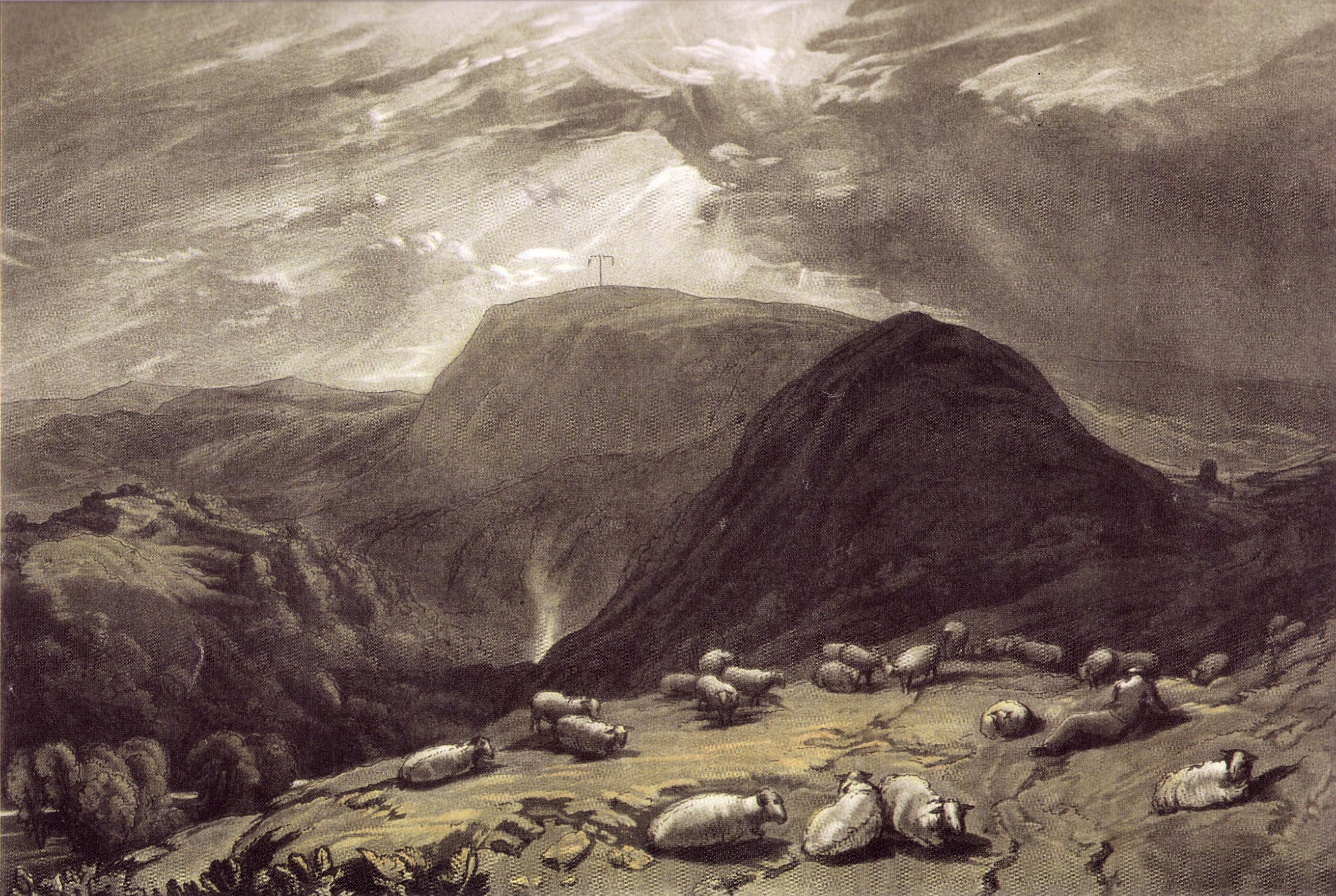
Hind-head Hill c.1808, by JMW Turner

The area was one of disrepute due to the activities of highwaymen and robbers, the corpses of three of whom were formerly displayed there on a gibbet as punishment for their crimes. The Celtic cross, a Grade II listed structure, is reported either to have been erected by the judge Sir William Erle, or an unmarked memorial erected after his death.

The general area is one of heathland and gorse, and was originally an area of the broomsquire, who would harvest the heather, broom, and birch branches to make brooms. The area is in the care of the National Trust, and was one of their earliest acquisitions.

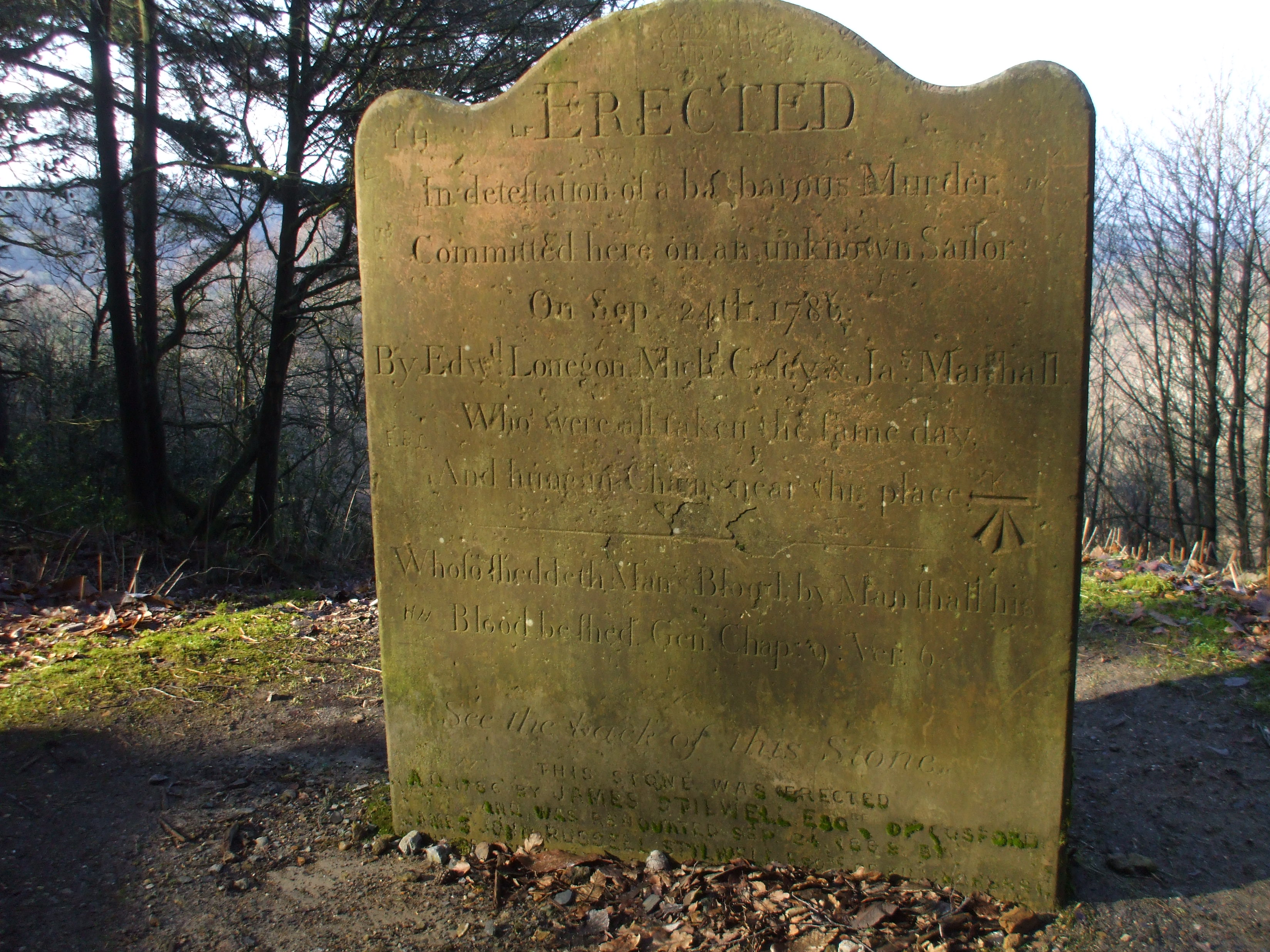
Stone erected in memory of the murdered sailor, with the Devil's Punchbowl beyond

Gibbet Hill and the nearby area were mentioned by Dickens in his 1839 novel Nicholas Nickleby, in the scene where Nickleby was walking from London to Portsmouth.

They walked upon the rim of the Devil's Punch Bowl; and Smike listened with greedy interest as Nicholas read the inscription upon the stone which, reared upon that wild spot, tells of a murder committed there by night. The grass on which they stood, had once been dyed with gore; and the blood of the murdered man had run down, drop by drop, into the hollow which gives the place its name. "The Devil's Bowl," thought Nicholas, as he looked into the void, "never held fitter liquor than that!"

Dickens was referring to the murder on 24 September 1786 of an Unknown Sailor who was met by three men in the Red Lion at Thursley as he was travelling to his ship in Portsmouth. He bought them drinks and they then followed him and murdered him in the Devil's Punch Bowl. They were quickly apprehended at the Sun Inn in Rake, tried and executed, and their bodies hung on Gibbet Hill. The unknown sailor was buried in Thursley churchyard, and a memorial stone (now listed Grade II) was erected on Gibbet Hill near the scene of the crime.

In 1890 it was the setting for "Gibbet Hill", a short story by Bram Stoker published in the Christmas supplement of the Daily Express.

The area is also the setting for Sabine Baring-Gould's 1896 novel The Broom-squire, of which the sailor's (supposed) child is a central character. In 1986, Peter Moorey suggested that the sailor was an Edward Hardman.

=== World War 2 ===
From March 1942, an RAF station (RAF Hindhead) was operational on the hill with two radar towers to aid aircraft guidance, part of the Gee navigation system. The towers were constructed of wood and were 250 feet (76 m) tall.

==== USAAF Curtiss-Wright C-46 Commando crash ====
On 6 May 1945, a Curtiss-Wright C-46 Commando (44-77839) of the United States Army Air Forces was flying over Gibbet Hill in bad weather when the aircraft struck a radar tower and crashed. All 30 passengers and crew, along with one Canadian serviceman on the ground, died.
