= Devil's Jumps, Churt =

Hills in Surrey, England

Coordinates: 51°8′52.86″N 0°45′53.06″W

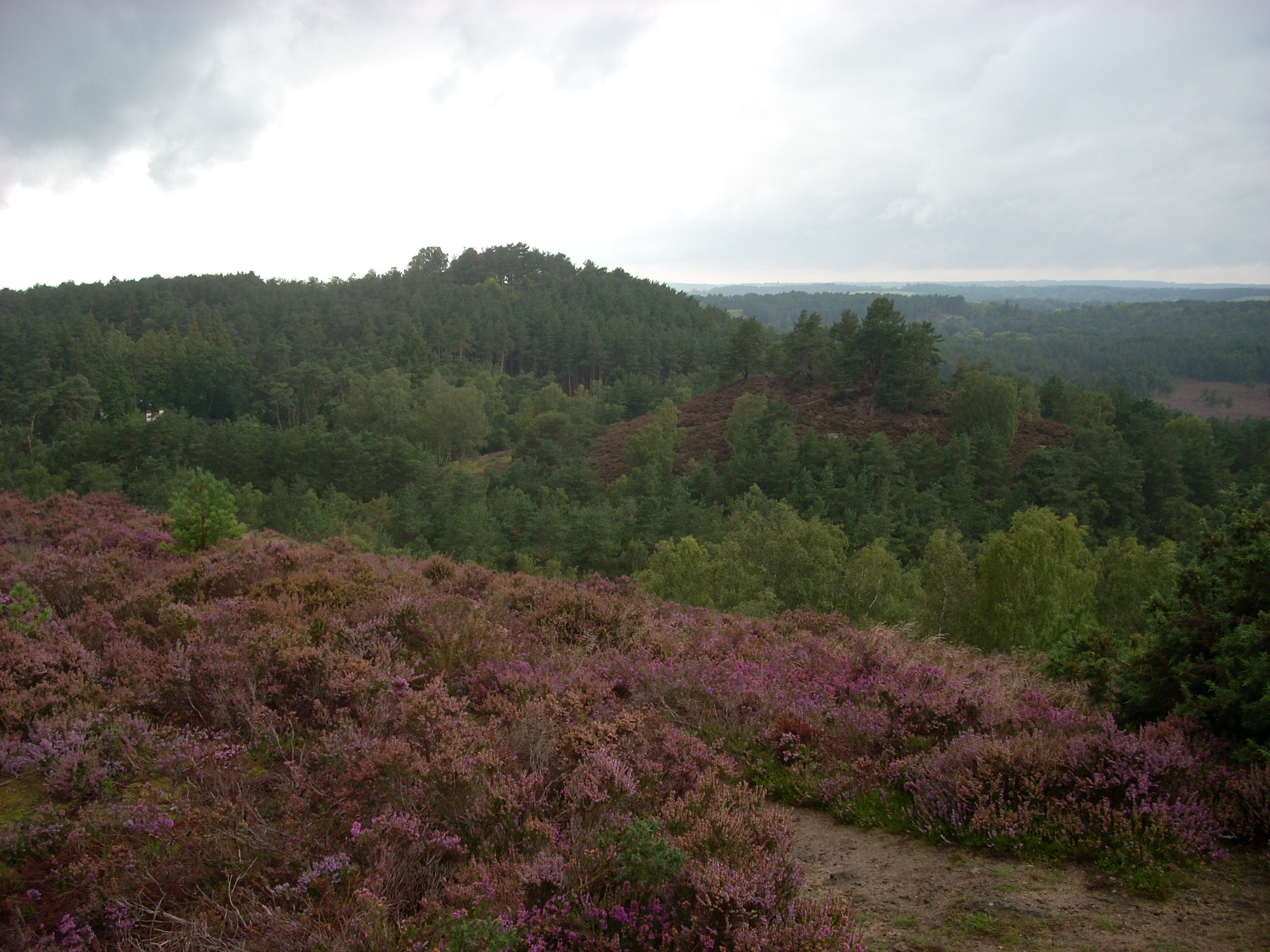
The Devil's Jumps. Looking across Middle Jump to High Jump from the summit of the easternmost hill, Stony Jump

The Devil's Jumps are a series of three small hills near the village of Churt in the county of Surrey in southern England. In the 18th century, the hills were known as the Devil's Three Jumps. The Devil's Jumps are linked to a body of folklore relating to the surrounding area. The highest of the three Jumps, lying to the west, is High Jump with an elevation of 413 feet (126 m). Middle Devil's Jump has an elevation of 328 feet (100 m) and once supported an observatory built by 19th century British astronomer Richard Christopher Carrington. Stony Jump, the easternmost of the jumps, has an elevation of 394 feet (120 m).

The hills are outcrops of an ironstone variety of sandstone of the Folkestone Beds of Lower Greensand set among acidic heathland. The three hills are formed of an ironstone known locally as carstone, marginally distinct from Bargate stone, strongly cemented with iron making it resistant to erosion by the elements.

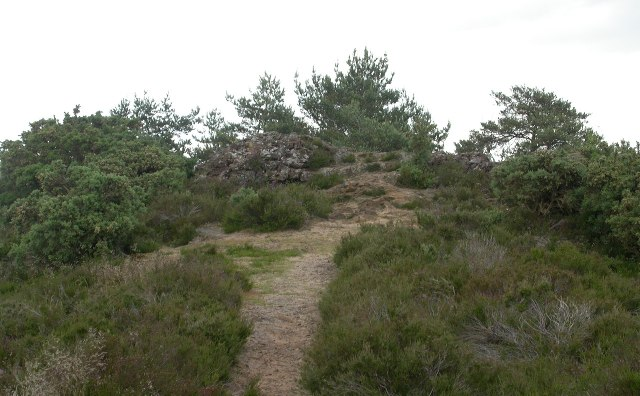
The summit of Stony Jump

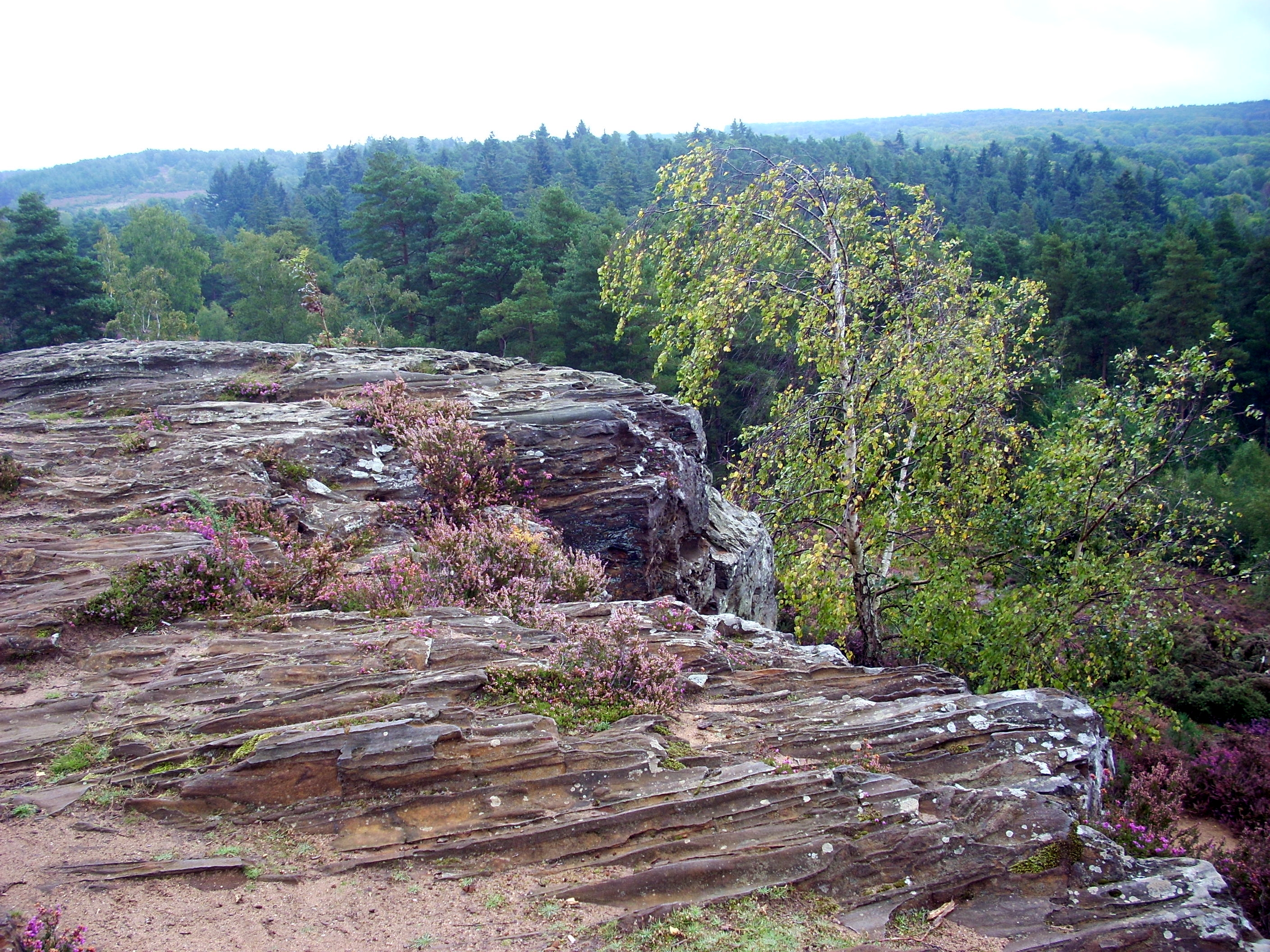
Ironstone outcrop on Stony Jump

The first mention of the Devil's Jumps appears to be on a map by John Rocque, dating to 1765. William Cobbett mentioned the Devil's Jumps in his Rural Rides, first published in 1830. Of the hills he says:

At Churt I had, upon my left, three hills out upon the common, called the Devil's Jumps...in the shape of three rather squat sugar-loaves, along in a line upon this heath...[with] a rock-stone upon the top of one of them as big as a Church tower...

— William Cobbett, Rural Rides 1830, 2001, p.116.

== Folklore ==
The Devil's Jumps are linked to a variety of local landmarks by folklore, including Mother Ludlam's Cave near the ruins of Waverley Abbey, the Devil's Punch Bowl at Hindhead, the village of Thursley and the parish church at Frensham. The folklore includes various tales. One states that the Devil used to amuse himself by leaping from the top of each hill to the next. This annoyed the god Thor who picked up a boulder and threw it at the Devil, causing him to flee and leaving the boulder at the Devil's Jumps. This same story is told of the Devil's Jumps near Treyford on the South Downs in West Sussex, but it is likely to have originated at the Devil's Jumps in Surrey. The inclusion of the pagan god Thor in the tale is likely to have taken place in the early years of the 20th century, since local historian George Clinch mentioned the Jumps and the pagan derivation of the Thursley placename without linking either when he wrote in 1895.

Two divergent, possibly linked, narratives were collected in the 19th century:

1. Mother Ludlam (who was a witch) had her cauldron stolen by the Devil, who made off with it, with the witch following behind on her broomstick. Every time the Devil took a great leap he kicked up a hill, and these hills are the Devil's Jumps. He left the cauldron on Kettlebury Hill, from where it was recovered and put in Frensham church for safekeeping. When the Devil disappeared, he left the valley of the Devil's Punch Bowl.
2. A great boulder was on one of these hills, where a person needing any tool, even a yoke for oxen by prayer and touching the boulder would receive it, provided they promised to give it back. Later a cauldron was requested, kept in Frensham's church beyond its use and so the mystical loan facility came to an end.

== Elevation and Prominence ==
High Jump has an elevation of 126 metres (413 ft) above sea level and 34 metres (112 ft) above the col (nearest notch/gap). This places the Devil's Jumps 32nd among Surrey Hills and narrowly among the 34 Surrey Hills above 100 metres (330 ft) above sea level with only 36 hills in the county listed by the national hill-climbing database.
