= No entry (disambiguation) =

In road traffic, the term no entry often refers to the signages used in one-way traffic.

No entry may also refer to:

- No Entry, a 2005 Indian Hindi-language film directed by Anees Bazmee
- No Entry, a 1954 novel written by Monica Edwards
