= Peter Roth-Ehrang =

German operatic bass

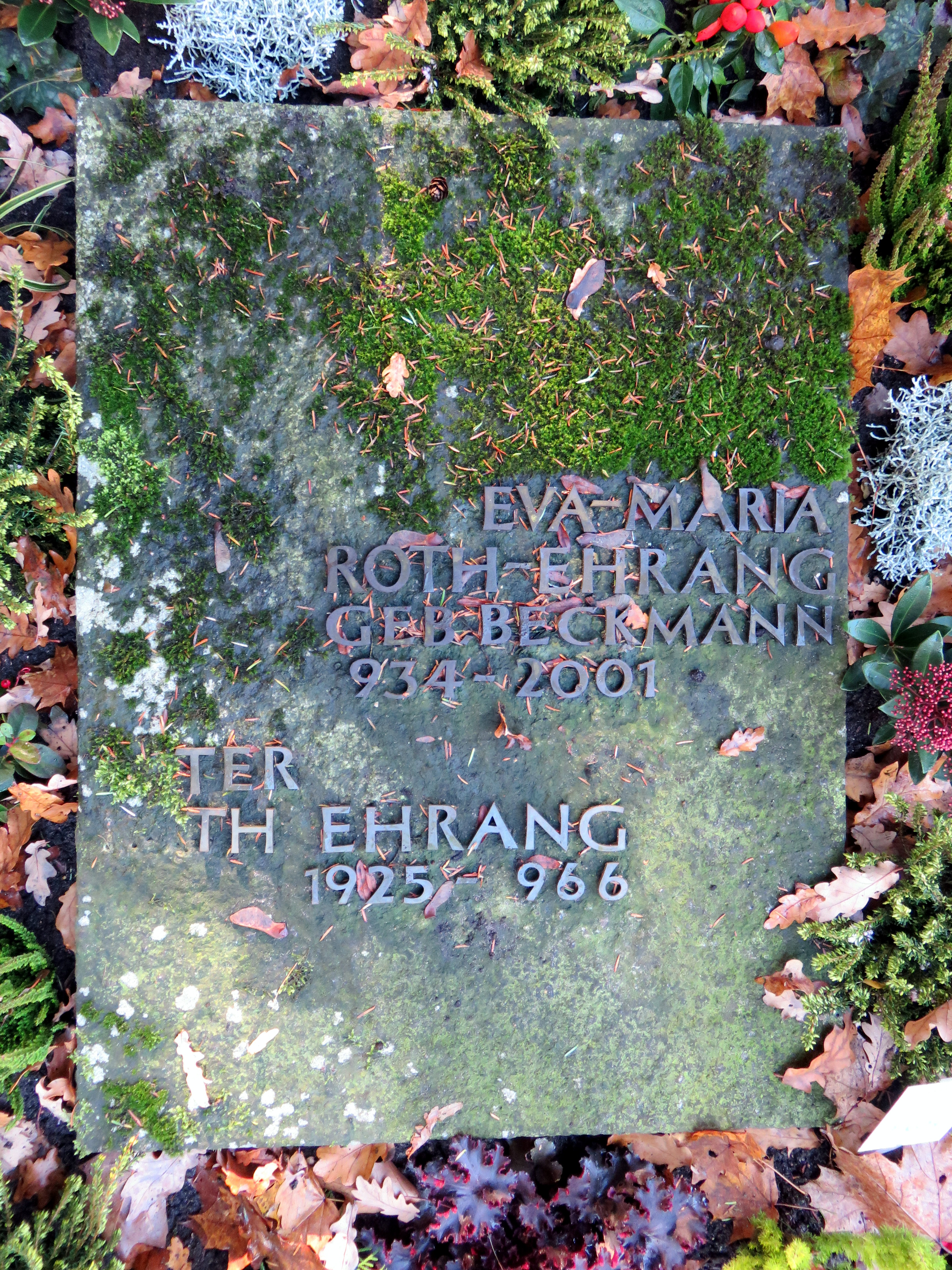
- Gravestone of Peter Roth-Ehrang, Ohlsdorf Cemetery
- Born: June 8, 1925; Ehrang, Germany
- Died: December 28, 1966 (aged 41); Hamburg, Germany
- Resting place: Ohlsdorf Cemetery, Hamburg
- Occupations: Operatic bass, actor
- Years active: 1948–1966

Peter Roth-Ehrang (8 June 1925 – 28 December 1966) was a German operatic bass and actor.

== Life ==
Born in Ehrang, Roth-Ehrang came from a family of craftsmen; his father was a master printer. Before embarking on a full-time career as an artist, he was a trained surveyor. After his release from French captivity (May 1948), Roth-Ehrang trained his bass voice in Trier and Wiesbaden. He composed his stage name Peter Roth-Ehrang from his civil name Peter Roth and his hometown Ehrang.

Stations in his career were Theater Trier, Anhaltisches Theater, Municipal Opera in West Berlin, Leipzig Opera, Hamburg State Opera, German Festival in Central Germany, Bayreuth Festival, Handel Festival in Hanover Herrenhausen and many guest performances in German and European cities.

Roth-Ehrang was also a TV actor. In the television film Schwarzer Peter – Märchenoper für kleine und große Leute (1966) he played the broomsquire alongside Theo Lingen, Brigitte Mira and Henry Vahl. Before he could start his guest performance contract at the Metropolitan Opera New York, he died in Hamburg at the age of 41 as a result of a heart attack.

His grave is located in the Ohlsdorf Cemetery in plan square Y 10 (southwest of Nordteich).

== Honours ==
Known as "Roth's Pitt" in his home town of Ehrang, a square was named after him. There, is a fountain with a bench and a commemorative plaque.

Since the 1970s, the opera singer Franz Grundheber has given a concert every five years with the Männergesangverein Rheinland-Ehrang to commemorate his mentor Peter Roth-Ehrang.

== Recordings ==
- Richard Wagner: Der Ring des Nibelungen. Line Music, Hamburg 2011.
- Claudio Monteverdi: L’Orfeo. M.A.T. Music Theme Licensing / Membran Entertainment Group, Hamburg 2010?.
- Adolphe Adam: Si j’étais roi / Wenn ich König wär’. (Auswahl) EMI-Electrola, Cologne 2004.
