= Stephen Harding (cricketer) =

English cricketer

Stephen Harding was an English cricketer of the mid-18th century. He played for Thursley, Chertsey, England, and Surrey. Harding was a hard-hitting batsman and a good bowler, although his style and pace is unknown. He featured in single wicket contests and was a fine all-rounder.

== Career ==
Harding is first recorded in May 1751 when he played for England v Kent at the Artillery Ground. England won by 9 runs with Harding's significant contribution. Although picked as a bowler, he and an unnamed Chertsey player opened England's second innings and scored 51 for the first wicket. Harding apparently made 50 himself and had one hit out of the ground and against a house on Bunhill Row opposite. He was given four for this mighty effort. You could only score six if you were actually able to run that many and to do that you would need the help of overthrows.

Soon afterwards, in a return match, Harding again played for England and they beat Kent by an inning.

In 1759, Harding was a member of the England Eleven beaten twice by Dartford Cricket Club.

He was still making big hits in September 1765, when he played for Chertsey against Richmond on Richmond Green. Helping Chertsey to win by 106 runs, Harding made 24 in four balls with a five, two sixes and a seven.

== Bibliography ==
- Haygarth, Arthur (1996) [1862]. Scores & Biographies, Volume 1 (1744–1826). Kennington: Frederick Lillywhite. ISBN 978-19-00592-23-9.
- Waghorn, H. T. (1899). Cricket Scores, Notes, &c. From 1730–1773. Edinburgh: Blackwood. OCLC 1086375331.
