= Devil's Punch Bowl =

Site of special scientific interest in Surrey, England

Coordinates: 51.11689°N 0.72887°W

- Site of Special Scientific Interest
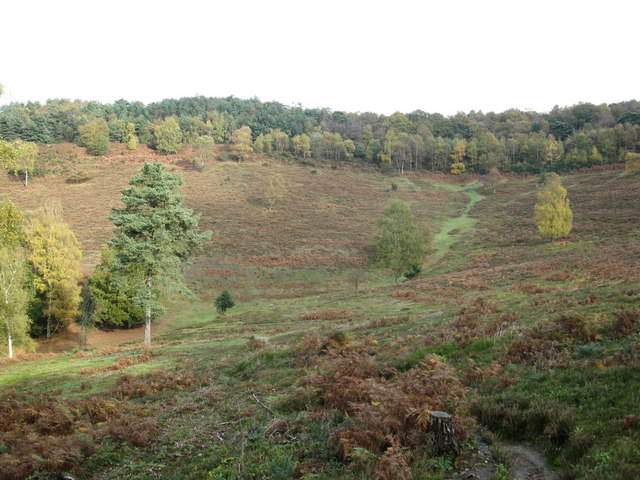
- The Devil's Punch Bowl seen from below
- Location of Devil's Punch Bowl.
- Area of search: Surrey
- Grid reference: SU 892 364
- Interest: Biological
- Area: 282.2 hectares (697 acres)
- Notification date: 1986
- Location map: Magic Map

The Devil's Punch Bowl is a 282.2-hectare (697-acre) visitor attraction and biological Site of Special Scientific Interest situated just to the east of the village of Hindhead in the English county of Surrey. It is part of the Wealden Heaths Phase II Special Protection Area.

The Punch Bowl is a large natural amphitheatre and is the source of many stories about the area. The London to Portsmouth road (the A3) skirted the rim of the site before the Hindhead Tunnel was built in 2011. The land is owned and maintained by the National Trust as part of the "Hindhead Commons and the Devil's Punch Bowl" property. The highest point of the rim of the bowl is Gibbet Hill, which is 272 metres (892 ft) above sea level and commands a panoramic view that includes, on a clear day, the skyline of London some 38 miles (61 km) away.

The Devil's Punch Bowl was featured on the 2005 TV programme Seven Natural Wonders as one of the wonders of the South.

== Toponym ==
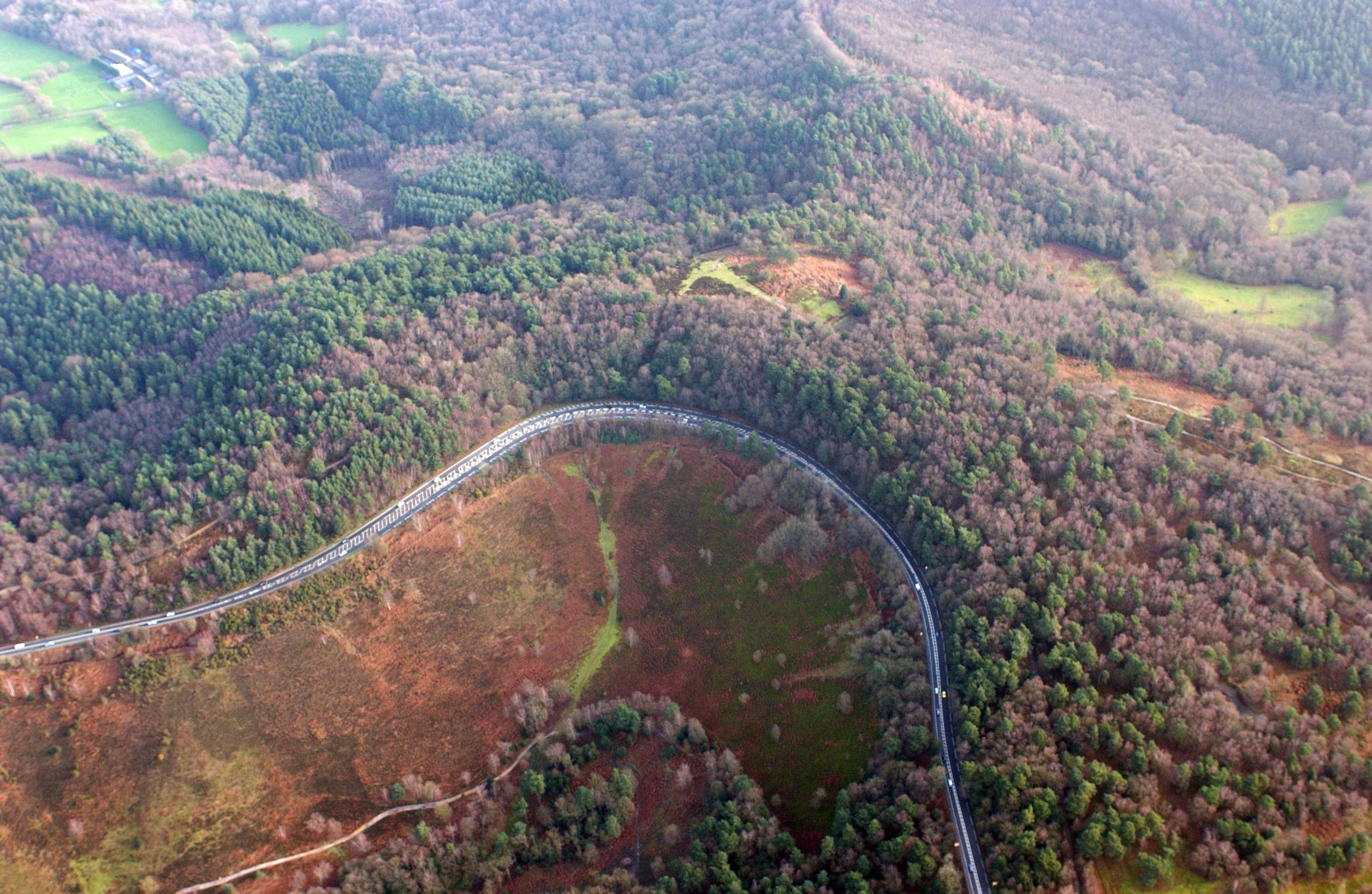
Aerial view of the Devil's Punch Bowl in January 2007, before the closure of the old A3.

The name Devil's Punch Bowl dates from at least 1768, the year that John Rocque's map of the area was published. This was 18 years before the murder of the unknown sailor on Gibbet Hill, so this event was clearly not the origin of the name. Prior to 1768, it was marked as "y^{e} Bottom" on a map by John Ogilby dated 1675. The northern end of the Bowl is known as Highcombe Bottom which exists in different variants: Hackombe Bottom, Hacham Bottom, and Hackham Bottom.

== Geology ==
This part of Surrey comprises a sandstone known as the Hythe Formation that lies above a mudstone known as the Atherfield Clay Formation. The bowl's deep depression is believed to be the result of erosion caused by spring water beneath the sandstone, causing the upper level to collapse. The steep slopes are characterised by heathland, streams and woodland.

The site, which has been designated a Site of Special Scientific Interest, has abundant wildlife such as the lesser spotted woodpecker and common redstart. It has been known for the wood warbler, a rare summer visitor with the last documented sighting in 2009.

== Roads ==
During the Tudor period in the 16th century, Portsmouth developed into a major naval dockyard, needing access to London. The steep gradients of the Devil's Punch Bowl and nearby Gibbet Hill made this difficult. As a consequence, there have been three phases of road construction through the Devil's Punch Bowl.

=== Earliest route ===
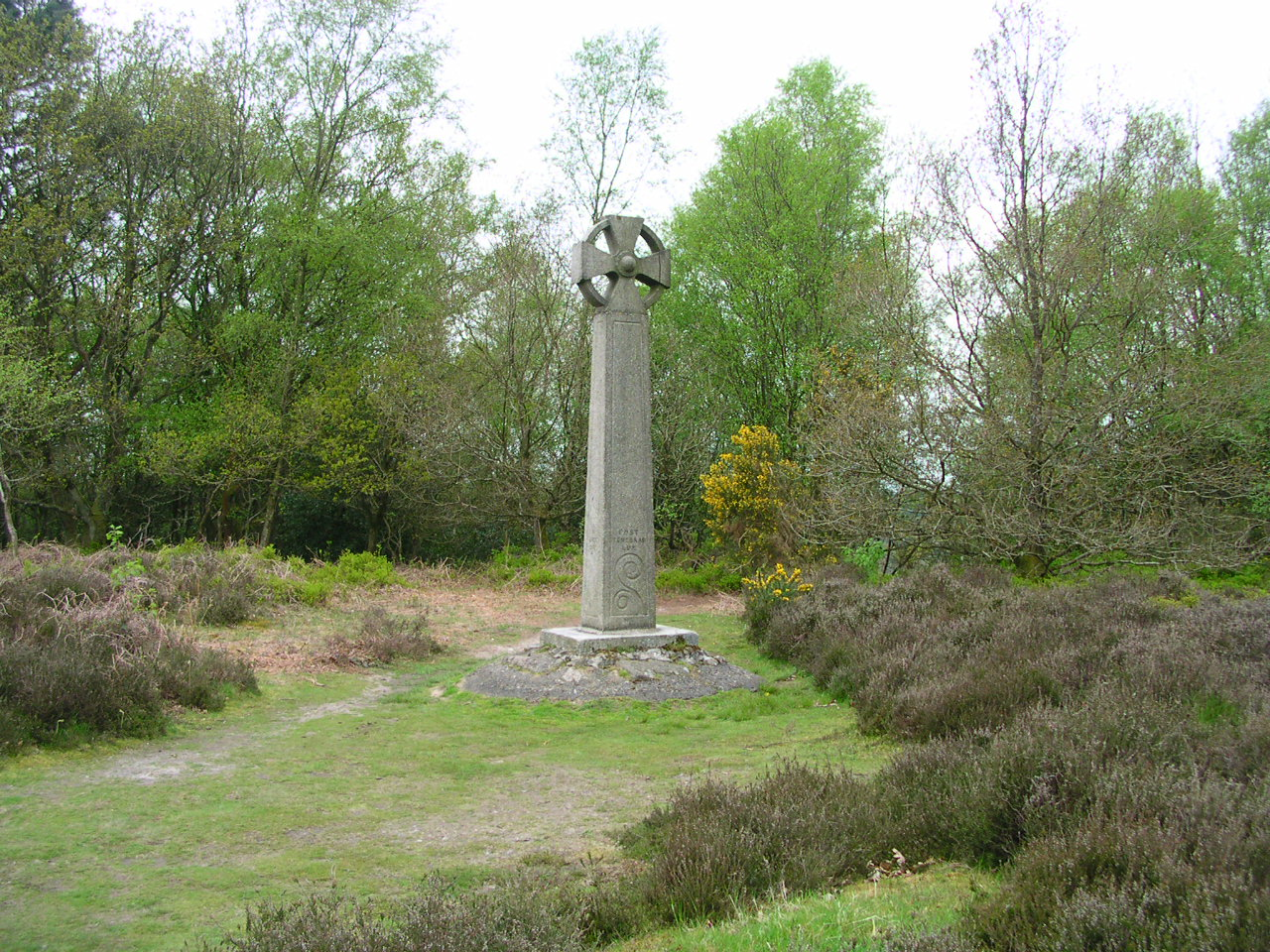
A granite Celtic Cross on Gibbet Hill that commemorates the site of the 1786 murder of the Unknown Sailor

The Old Portsmouth Road is the oldest highway through the area. It is a ridgeway that skirts the Punch Bowl to the summit of Gibbet Hill before descending into Hindhead. The murder of an unknown sailor in 1786 on this route is commemorated by the Sailor's Stone. The route is still used by walkers, cyclists and horse-riders.

=== Turnpike ===
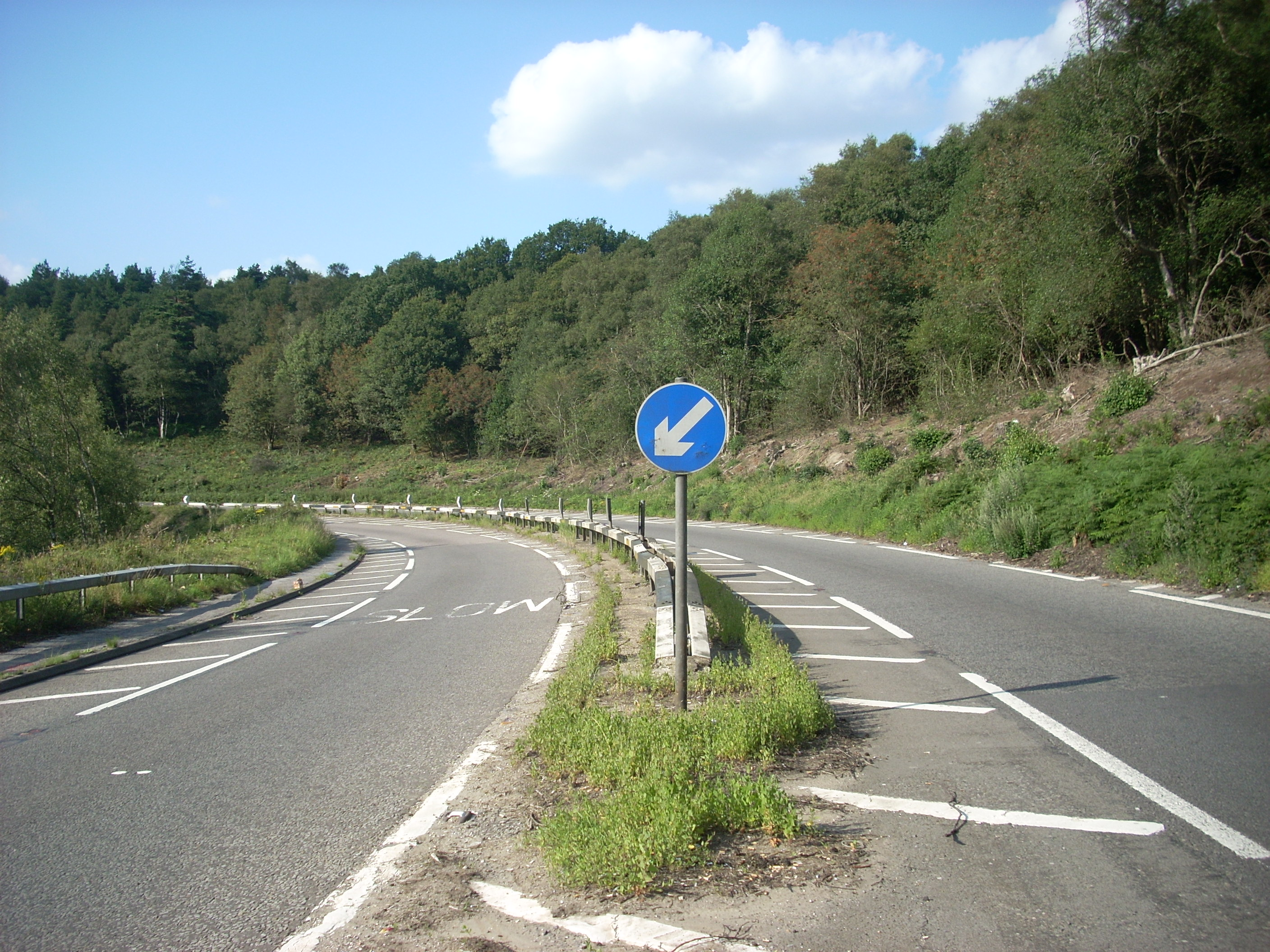
The 1826 route was created by a cutting through hillside of the Devil's Punch Bowl

In 1748 Kingston-Upon-Thames to Sheet Bridge Turnpike Company took over the management of Old Portsmouth Road. They installed mileposts, toll houses, gates and maintained the highway through the Devil's Punch Bowl. However, by the early 19th century increased pedestrian and horse-drawn traffic meant this steep section of highway between Portsmouth and London required major improvements.

In 1826, the Portsmouth & Sheet Bridge Turnpike Road Trust began asking for tenders from bidders to improve the road. The winning bid resulted in a completely new highway through the Devil's Punch Bowl. Old Portmouth Road was abandoned in favour of a new cutting 200 ft (61 m) below the ridgeline. By digging into the hillside at a lower height, the new road removed the steep ascents and descents of the summit over Gibbet Hill. The surveyed route had a gradient of no more than 5% which meant larger and heavier horse-drawn carriages could now use this section of the road.

In the 1920s, this route became the A3 when road numbering was introduced by the Ministry of Transport with the advent of motorised transport. For almost hundred years, it remained a principal route from London to Portsmouth.

=== Return to nature ===
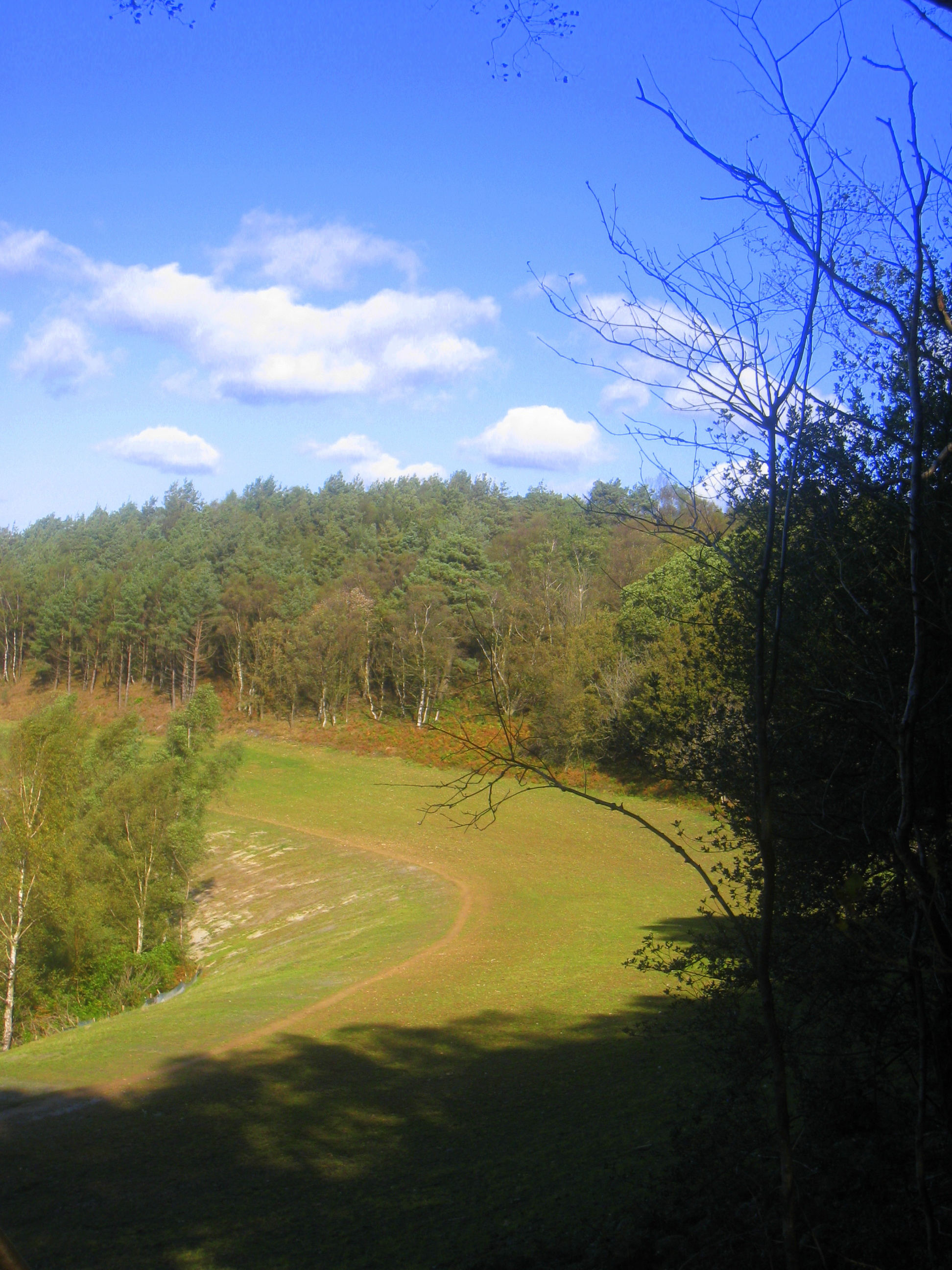
The 1826 turnpike route of the former A3 has been removed.

By the start of the 21st century most of the A3 had become a dual carriageway, leaving only the section through Hindhead and the Devil's Punch Bowl as single carriageway. Due to daily traffic volumes, this section operated at or above capacity for much of the day and had an accident rate 40% higher than the national average for that class of road. As a consequence, the decision to bypass the route over the Devil's Punch Bowl was taken.

The Hindhead Tunnel, which passes directly under Gibbet Hill and the Punch Bowl, opened in 2011. The 1826 turnpike route of the former A3 was completely removed with the intention that it will revert to natural heathland.

== Conservation ==
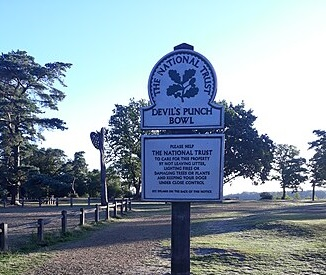
National Trust sign at the Punch Bowl

The Devil's Punch Bowl, along with Hindhead Common, was acquired by the National Trust in 1906, making it one of the first open spaces acquired by the Trust. The beauty of the area and the diversity of nature it attracts resulted in the Devil's Punch Bowl being designated as a Site of Special Scientific Interest on 30 April 1986.

This ownership and status helped save the Devil's Punch Bowl from above-ground redevelopment of the A3 in the first decade of the 21st century. The National Trust co-operated with developers Balfour Beatty, who designed the alternative Hindhead Tunnel, running underneath the area. The tunnel preserves not only the area from the road widening originally proposed but also removes the heavy traffic congestion which previously affected this section of the A3 in peak hours.

The National Trust provide car parking and a cafe at the Hindhead end of the Devil's Punch Bowl. A number of different footpaths, of differing length and difficulty, provide access to all parts of the Punch Bowl and surrounding area.

The Hindhead youth hostel, run by the Youth Hostel Association, used to be located inside the bowl but closed in 2015.

== In fiction ==
Punch Bowl Farm, at the northern end of the Devil's Punch Bowl, was the home of children's novelist Monica Edwards from 1947 until 1998. In her books she renamed the farm Punchbowl Farm. In Charles Dickens' novel Nicholas Nickleby, Nicholas and Smike visit the Devil's Punch Bowl on their journey to Portsmouth.

The third novel in the Horatio Hornblower series, Flying Colours by C.S. Forester, makes a one-line reference to the Devil's Punch Bowl in chapter eighteen as Hornblower is returning to London: "Even the marvellous beauty of the Devil's Punch Bowl was lost on Hornblower as they drove past it."

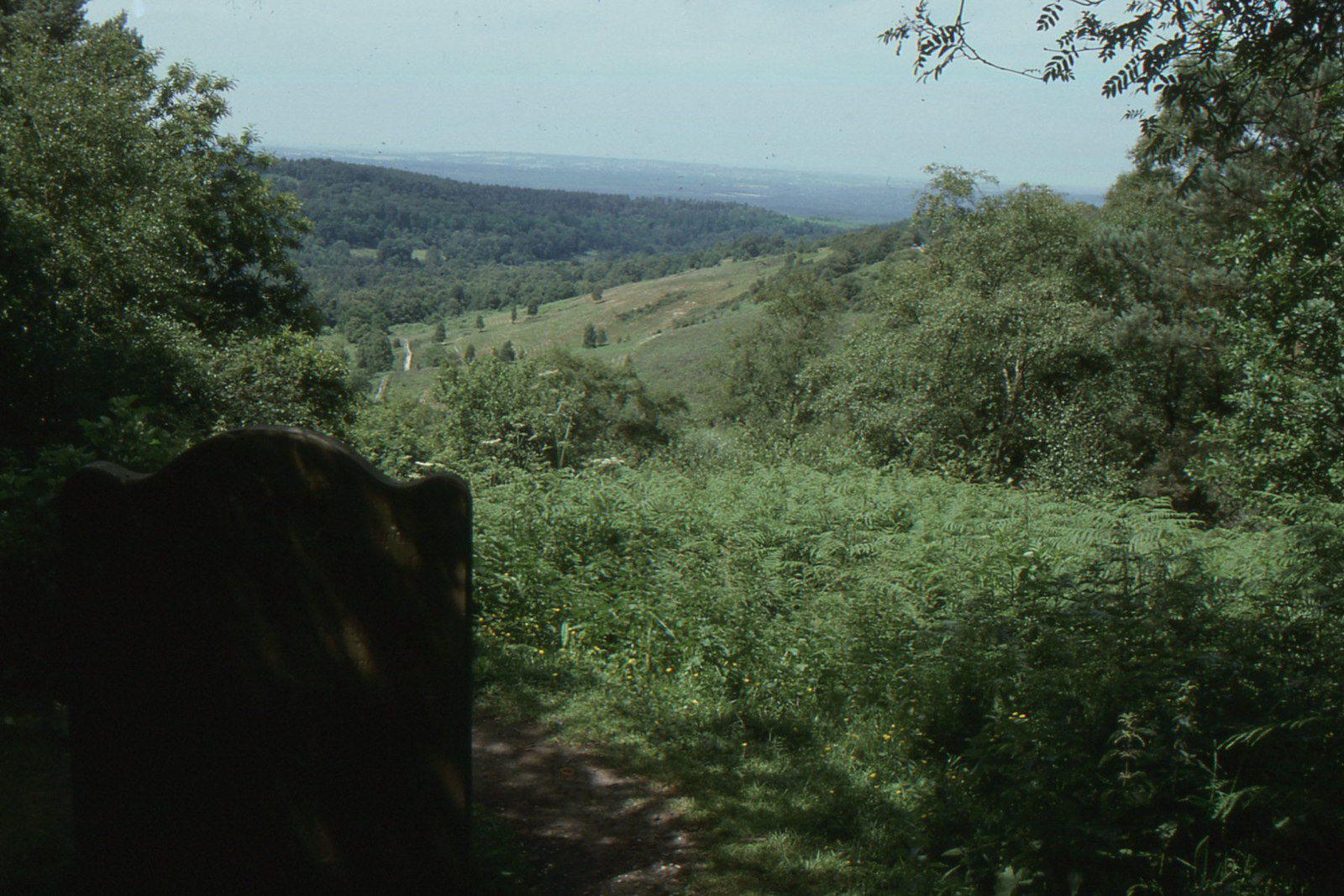
The Devil's Punch Bowl seen from above, by the Sailor's Stone

The "Devil's Punch-Bowl in Surrey" is briefly mentioned in The Shining Pyramid, a short story by Arthur Machen, and in "The Manhood of Edward Robinson", the fifth story in Agatha Christie's The Listerdale Mystery and Other Stories. The area is the setting for Sabine Baring-Gould's novel The Broom-squire.

== Local legends ==
According to a local legend the Devil hurled lumps of earth at the god Thor to annoy him. The hollow out of which he scooped the earth became the Punch Bowl. The local village of Thursley means Thor's place. An alternative version of this story says that Thor threw the lumps of earth at the Devil, who was annoying Thor by jumping across the Devil's Jumps.

== Legacy project ==
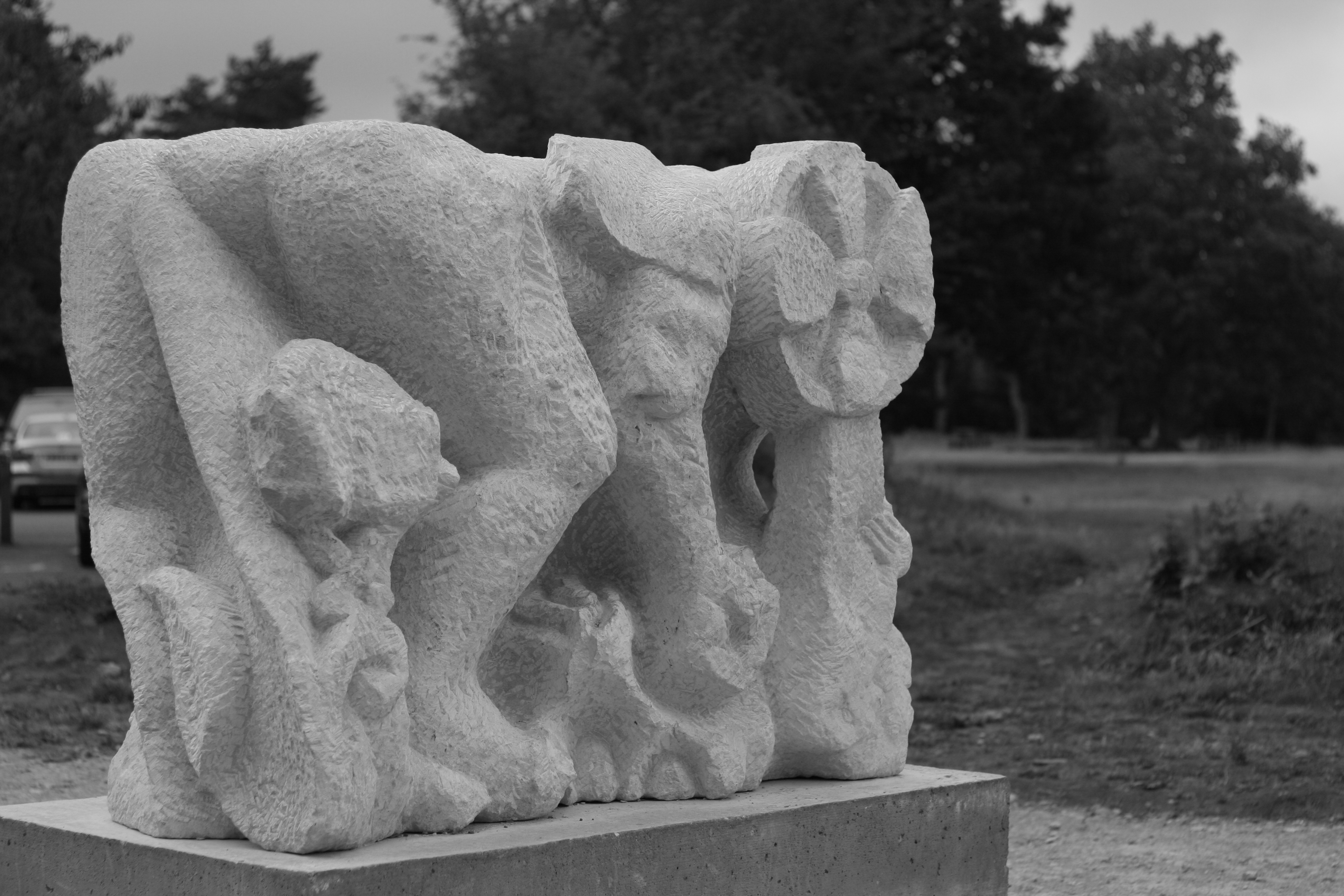
'Portal' sculpture by Jon Edgar at the Devil's Punch Bowl

A lottery award from the Heritage Lottery Fund was made in 2012 for a project with young people from schools in the area, celebrating the landscape. Several sculptures marked the completion in early 2013 and a carving from a 3-tonne block of Portland stone by Jon Edgar now sits on the spine of the former A3 near the visitor centre.

== See also ==
- Devil's Jumps, Churt
- List of Sites of Special Scientific Interest in Surrey
