= Franz Grundheber =

German operatic baritone (1937–2025)

- Grundheber c. 1980
- Born: 27 September 1937; Trier, Germany
- Died: 27 September 2025 (aged 88); Hamburg, Germany
- Occupation: Operatic baritone
- Organizations: Hamburg State Opera; Vienna State Opera
- Title: Kammersänger

Franz Grundheber (27 September 1937 – 27 September 2025) was a German operatic baritone. He was based at the Hamburg State Opera where he appeared in over 150 roles from 1966, celebrating his 2000th performance there in 2012, as Amonasro in Verdi's Aida. His voice, described as brilliant with a seamless legato and compelling high notes, was flexible enough to sing Italian opera as well as Wagner roles such as Der fliegende Holländer and Amfortas in Parsifal, and 20th-century roles such as Moses in Schoenberg's Moses und Aron and world premieres. He performed at major international opera houses, especially frequently at the Vienna State Opera.

Grundheber was a stage presence in acting and singing, often portraying complex characters such as Verdi's Rigoletto and Simon Boccanegra. He is especially remembered for various interpretations of the title role of Alban Berg's Wozzeck, including in a Vienna production conducted by Claudio Abbado in 1986, and a 1994 DVD from both the Théâtre du Châtelet in Paris and the Staatsoper Berlin, conducted by Daniel Barenboim and staged by Patrice Chéreau.

== Life and career ==
Grundheber was born in Trier on 27 September 1937. His father was mostly absent due to World War II, working as a lathe operator for the Hanomag cannon factory in Hanover until the boy was eight years old. His mother sent him to the Max-Planck Gymnasium secondary school, where his teacher of German introduced him to literature and theatre that he watched from age 14. He read at the time Büchner's Woyzeck, on which Berg's opera Wozzeck is based, and later said that "already then the story was in my imagination and my heart and my body". He sang in the choir of a Catholic youth group, and soon sang for money, accompanied by a friend who played piano, at functions such as weddings and funerals. Grundheber played no instrument. At age 18, he watched an opera for the first time, Mozart's Die Zauberflöte, and was fascinated by the bass voice of Peter Roth-Ehrang. The singer gave him lessons and recommended serious voice studies.

After school, in 1959, Grundheber enrolled in the German Air Force, where he spent three years. He took lessons in voice and drama in Hamburg, and was awarded a two-year scholarship to study with Margaret Harshaw, a Wagnerian soprano, at Indiana University in Bloomington, Indiana. In 1966 he spent a summer at the Music Academy of the West in Montecito, California.

In 1966 Grundheber joined the Hamburg State Opera, engaged by Rolf Liebermann. He became a prolific performer, singing smaller roles in different types of operas for a long time. On 21 December 1968, he took part in the German premiere of Gian Carlo Menotti's Help, Help, the Globolinks!. Additionally, he created a role of Lars Johan Werle's Die Reise in its world premiere on 2 March 1969 and another in Josef Tal's Ashmedai on 1 November 1971. Even when later moving to Wagnerian roles, he took care to stay flexible. He portrayed the title role in Wagner's Der fliegende Holländer only in the early 1980s, saying that he believed that "some characters require experience of life: death, betrayal, disappointment". With some 150 roles in his portfolio, he was named Kammersänger in Hamburg in 1986. From 1988 he appeared at the house as a regular guest.

Grundheber made his debut at the Vienna State Opera on 11 December 1976 in the title role of Mozart's Le nozze di Figaro, and in 1983 performed as Mandryka in Arabella by Richard Strauss. In 1985, Grundheber appeared as Olivier in Capriccio at the Salzburg Festival. The next year he first portrayed the title role of Berg's Wozzeck, staged by Gerard Mortier in Brussels. He then explored the role further at the Vienna State Opera the same year, alongside Hildegard Behrens as Marie, conducted by Claudio Abbado and directed by Claus Helmut Drese, in a production that was broadcast on television internationally. His Wozzeck, alongside Waltraud Meier as Marie, in a production shown from 1993 to 1999 at the Théâtre du Châtelet in Paris and the Staatsoper Berlin, conducted by Daniel Barenboim and directed by Patrice Chéreau, was recorded on DVD in 1994.

In 1992, he made his debut with the Royal Opera House in London, acting as Barak in Die Frau ohne Schatten by R. Strauss, conducted by Bernard Haitink. Michael Kennedy described his performance in The Sunday Telegraph as "in a class of its own for security and firmness". Grundheber returned to London in 1997 to portray Verdi's Rigoletto, making his debut with the Metropolitan Opera in the same role in 1999, where it was followed by Wozzeck. He returned to London as Verdi's Simon Boccanegra in 2004 and for a new production of Rigoletto by David McVicar in 2007.

Grundheber excelled in both German and Italian repertoire. His roles in German opera included Wagner's Holländer and Amfortas in Parsifal, the Strauss roles of Jochanaan in Salome, Orest in Elektra, and Barak in Die Frau ohne Schatten, as well as the title role in Hindemith's Cardillac, Borromeo in Pfitzner's Palestrina, and Dr. Schön in Alban Berg's Lulu. He was able to perform as Jupiter in Die Liebe der Danae without transposition of the high notes. His Verdi characters included Boccanegra, Rigoletto, Macbeth, Amonasro in Aida and Jago in Otello. Stephan Mösch noted in his obituary for the FAZ that as Rigoletto and Boccanegra, he used vocal brilliance, seamless legato phrases and compelling high notes to portray the emotional depths and despair of the characters.

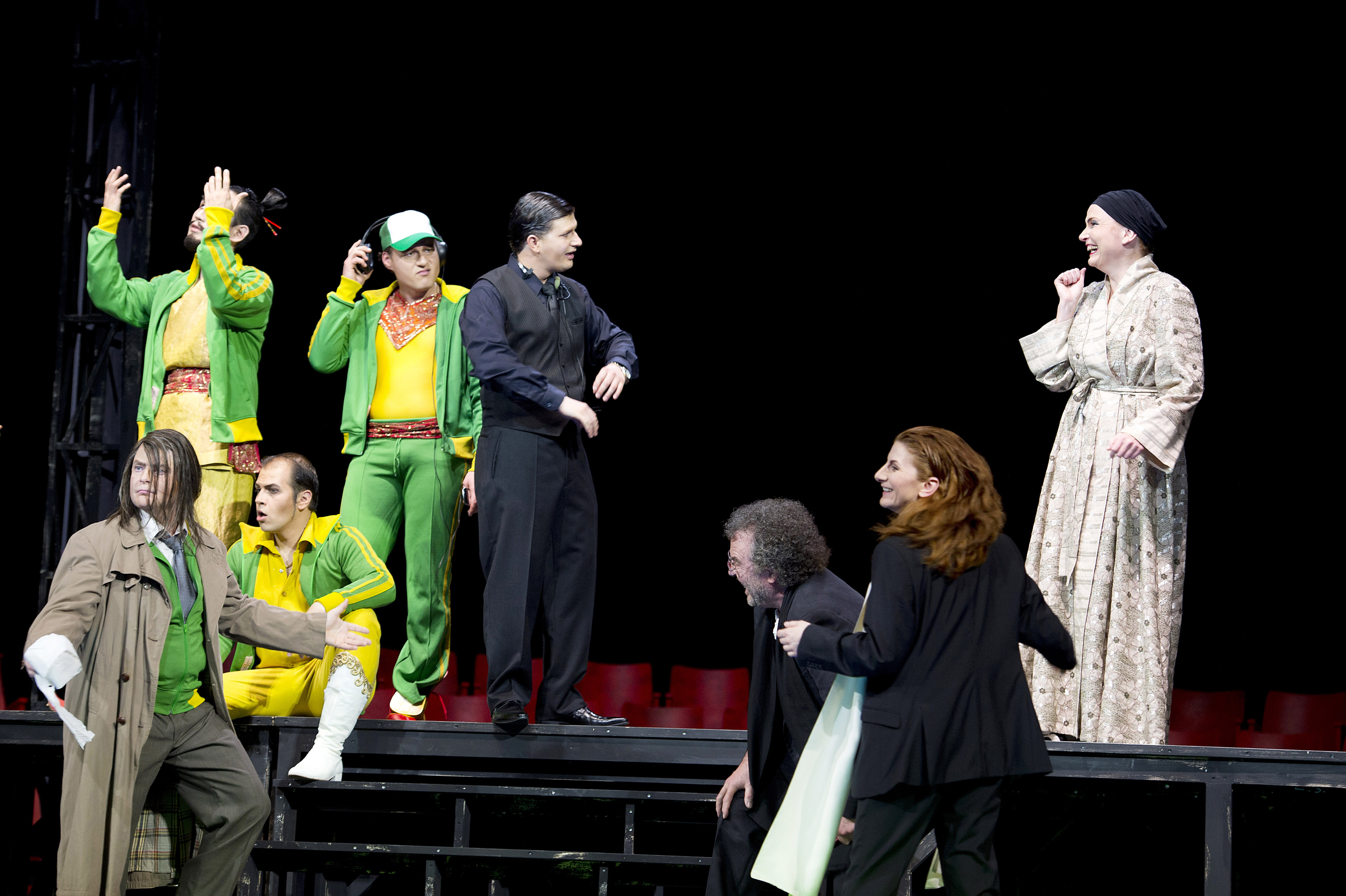
Grundheber (3rd from right) in Ariadne auf Naxos at Hamburg State Opera in 2012

The last role that he learned was the leading role of Moses in Schoenberg's Moses und Aron staged at the Vienna State Opera in 2006, with Thomas Moser and conducted by Daniele Gatti. He portrayed this role also at the Elbphilharmonie. Grundheber celebrated his 2000th performance at the Hamburg State Opera on 1 February 2012, appearing as Amonasro. He was a favourite at the Vienna State Opera where he gained his second title of Kammersänger; his last role there, after more than 250 performances, was Schigolch in Berg's Lulu in 2017.

=== Personal life ===
Grundheber was married twice, his second wife was Angelika, and he had a daughter and a son.

Grundheber died in Hamburg on 27 September 2025, his 88th birthday. A black flag was flown by the Vienna State Opera as a sign of mourning.

== Recordings ==
Grundheber appeared in 1979 as Albert in a recording of Massenet's Werther, alongside Elena Obraztsova, Arleen Augér and Plácido Domingo, with the Cologne Radio Symphony Orchestra conducted by Riccardo Chailly. In 1986, he recorded Mandryka in Arabella, with Kiri te Kanawa in the title role, chorus and orchestra of the Royal Opera House, Covent Garden, conducted by Jeffrey Tate. He recorded in 1988 Paul Hindemith's Mörder, Hoffnung der Frauen, singing The Man with Gabriele Schnaut as The Woman, conducted by Gerd Albrecht. In 1987 he appeared in the title role of Claudio Abbado's recording of Wozzeck, recorded and filmed live at the Vienna State Opera. In 1989, he performed for DVD the title role of Wagner's Der fliegende Holländer, with Behrens as Senta, a production of the Savonlinna Opera Festival conducted by Leif Segerstam. In 1996, he recorded Barak in Die Frau ohne Schatten, with Deborah Voigt, Sabine Haas and Hanna Schwarz, and the Staatskapelle Dresden conducted by Giuseppe Sinopoli. In 2003, he appeared on the recording of concerts of Die Liebe der Danae by the chorus and orchestra of the Theater Kiel, conducted by Ulrich Windfuhr. In 2006, he performed Moses on a DVD of Schoenberg's Moses und Aron, conducted by Daniele Gatti.
