= Broomsquire =

Occupation

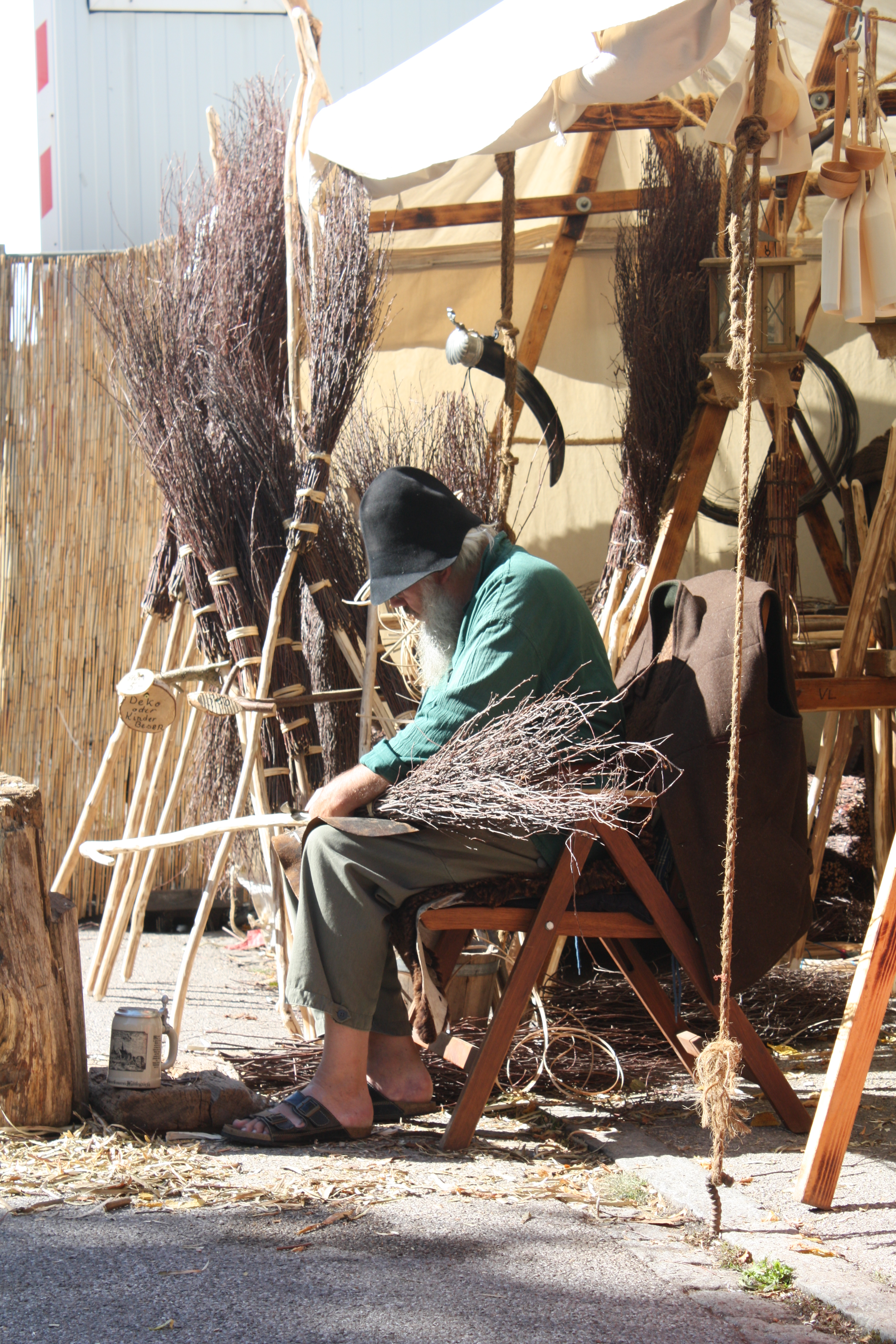

A broomsquire is someone who makes besom brooms for a living. It is a trade that was historically associated with heathland areas of England. The broomsquire tended to use heather or birch twigs gathered from the heathland to make the brooms. They also grazed cattle or sheep on the poor vegetation. The broomsquire was described by Sabine Baring-Gould in his novel The Broomsquire written in 1896 and set in the Devil's Punch Bowl, Hindhead. In his 1903 ghost story The Blood-Eagle, Robert Hugh Benson hints at links between broomsquires and paganism.
