= Thursley =

Village and parish in Surrey, England

Coordinates: 51.149°N 0.707°W

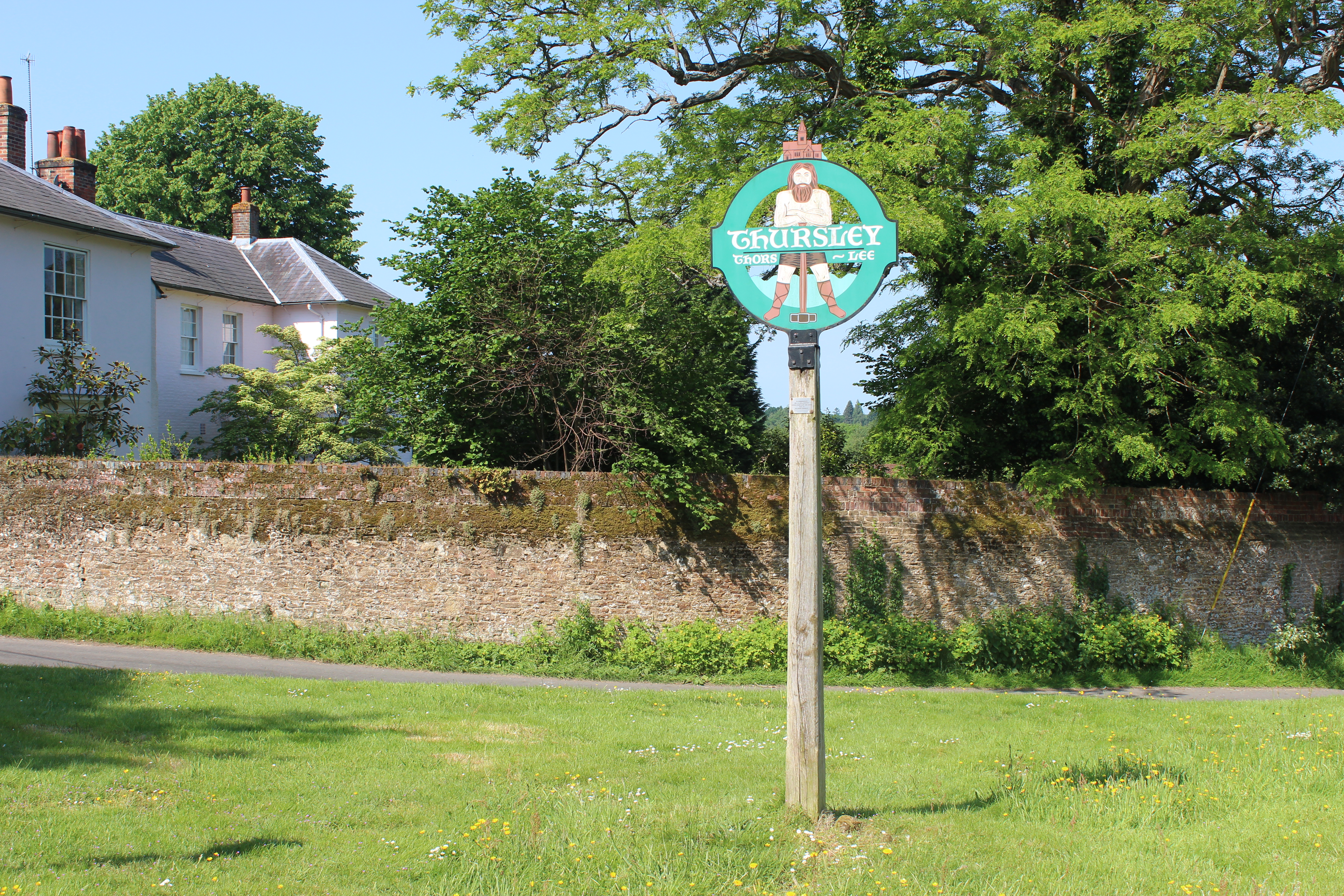
- Thursley village green and village sign

- Location within Surrey
- Area: 19.85 km^{2} (7.66 sq mi)
- Population: 651 (Civil Parish 2011)
  - Density: 33/km^{2} (85/sq mi)
- OS grid reference: SU9040
- Civil parish: Thursley
- District: Waverley
- Shire county: Surrey
- Region: South East
- Country: England
- Sovereign state: United Kingdom
- Post town: Godalming
- Postcode district: GU8
- Dialling code: 01252
- Police: Surrey
- Fire: Surrey
- Ambulance: South East Coast
- UK Parliament: Godalming and Ash

Thursley is a village and civil parish in southwest Surrey, west of the A3 between Milford and Hindhead. An associated hamlet is Bowlhead Green. To the east is Brook. In the south of the parish rises the Greensand Ridge, in this section reaching its escarpment near Punch Bowl Farm and the Devil's Punch Bowl, Hindhead.

== History ==
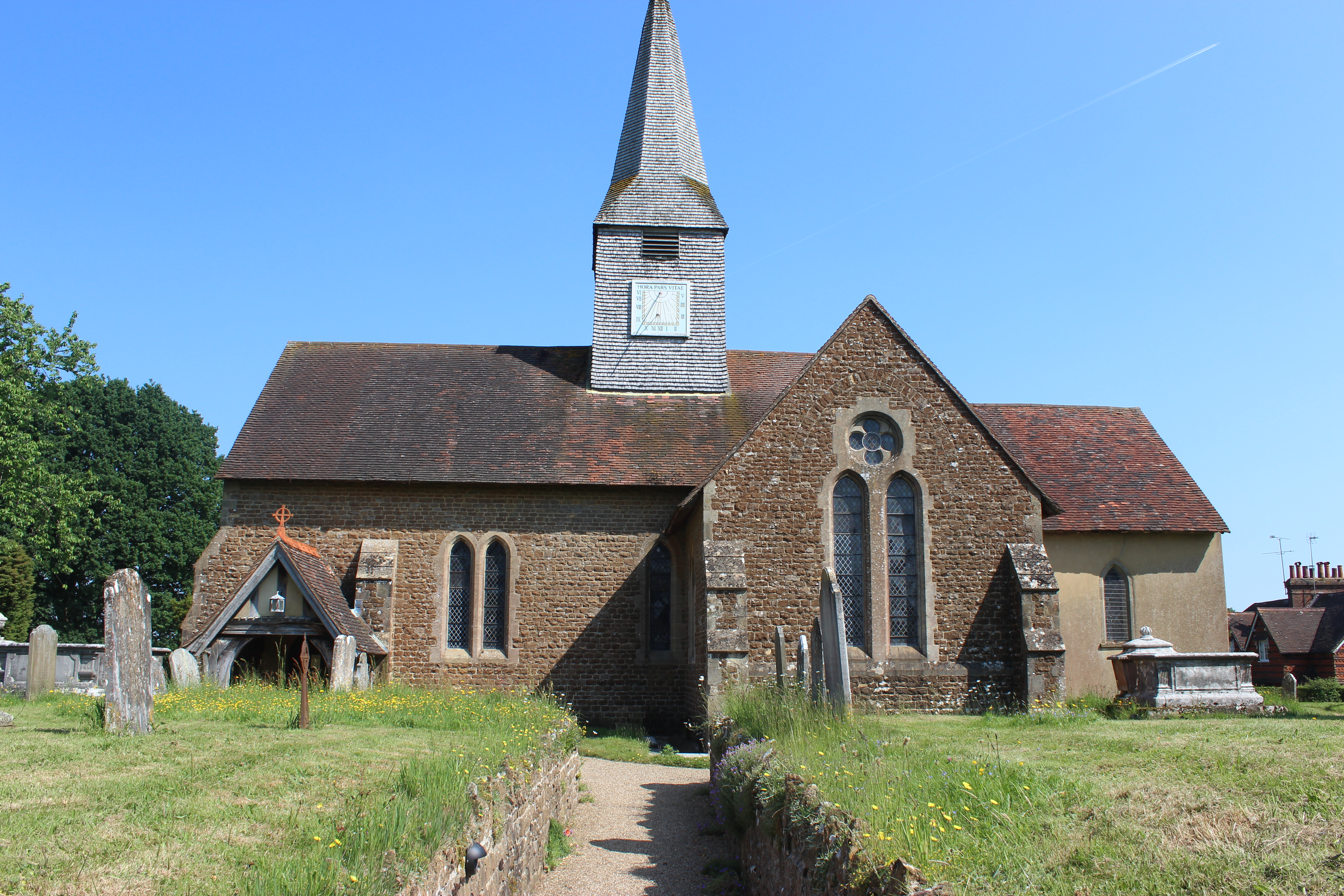
St Michael and All Angels Church in Thursley dates back to Saxon times, though most of the structure is later

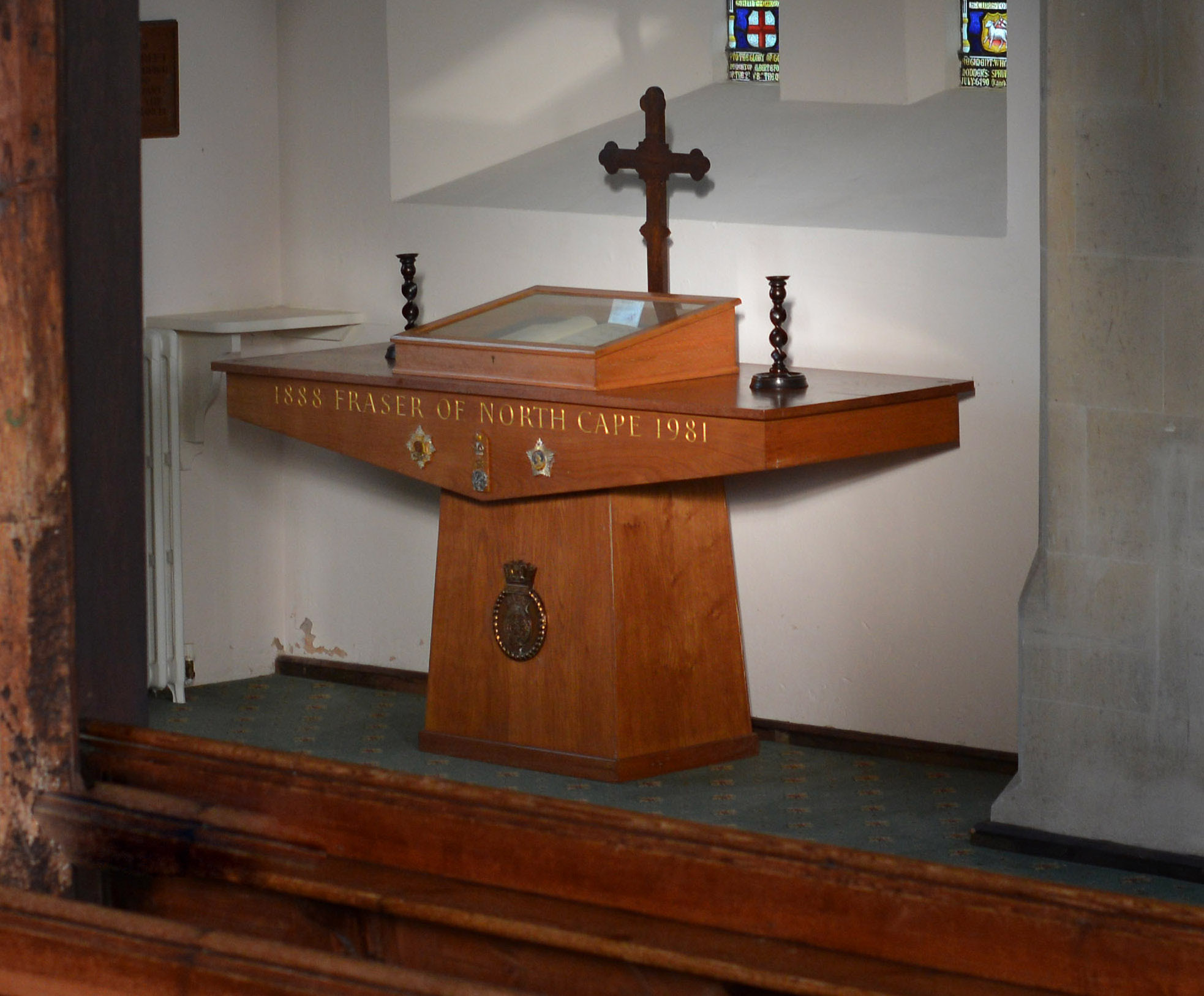
Memorial to Admiral of the Fleet Bruce Fraser, 1st Baron Fraser of North Cape at St Michael and All Angels Church in Thursley

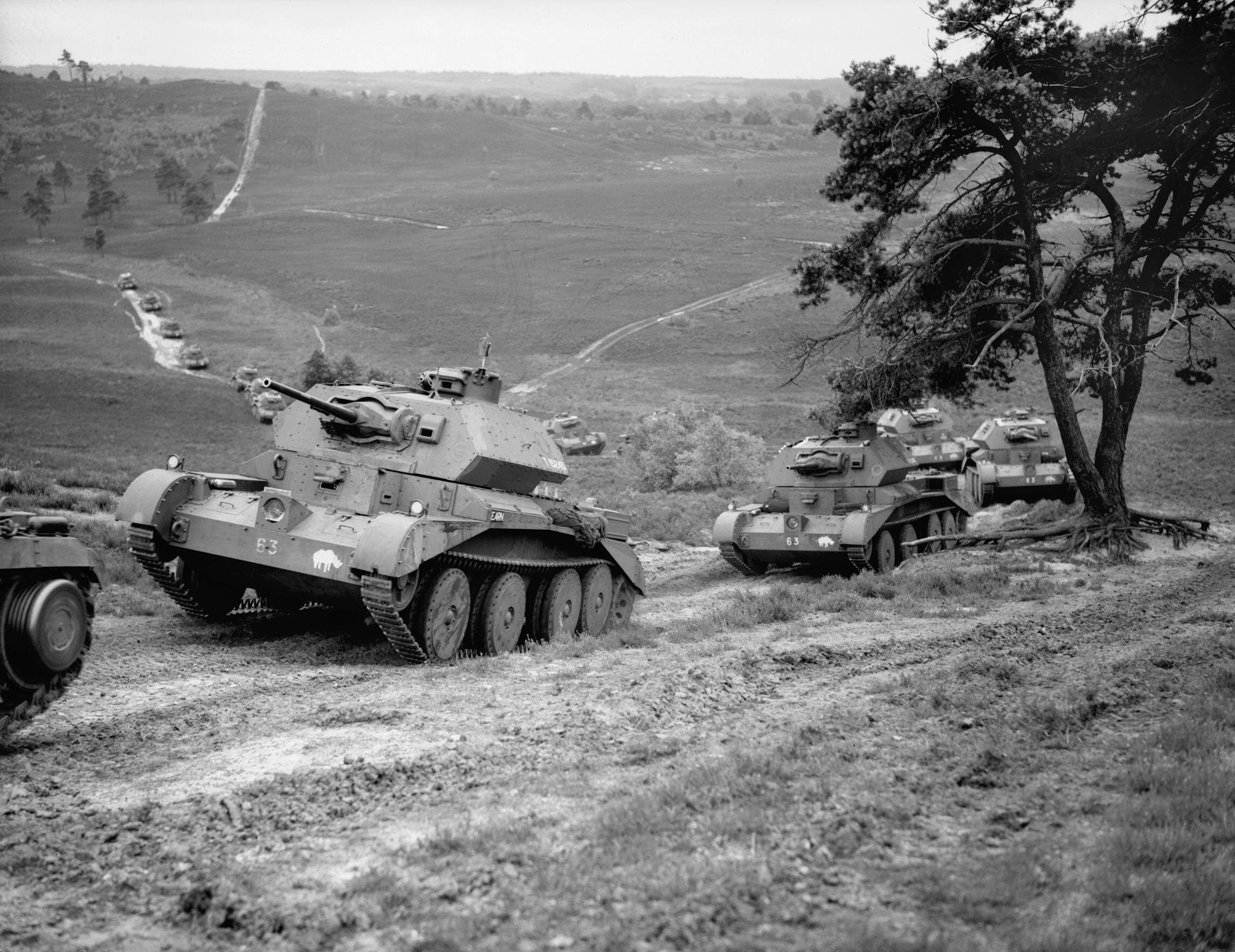
Cruiser Mk IV tanks of 5th Royal Tank Regiment, 3rd Armoured Brigade, 1st Armoured Division, on Thursley Common in July 1940

The village's name came from Old English Þunres lēah meaning lea of the god Thunor, as with Thundersley, Essex; it was probably a site where he was worshipped. There is a rocky outcrop near the village referred to in Victorian guides to the area as Thor's Stone. This stone is first mentioned in Saxon times as being "near Peper Harow", an adjacent parish with known pagan connections. The precise stone or rocks this refers to is now uncertain, with some sources indicating it could be the rocky outcrop and others suggesting it may be an ancient Celtic boundary stone found on the margin of Pudmore pond on Ockley Common.

Thursley was briefly noted for cricket in the early 1750s. Two of its players, Stephen Harding and another (unnamed), both played for England against Kent in two 1751 matches. In the same season, a match on the Artillery Ground was advertised beforehand as: "Addington, Warlingham, Croydon & Cheam versus Ripley, Thursley & London". It was arranged "by the noblemen and gentlemen of the London Club". No details were reported afterwards. In the 1754 season, a match in Guildford was advertised as: "Guildford, Ripley, Thursley and the lower part of Surrey against Bolney, Brighton and the eastern part of Sussex". The stake was 20 guineas a side.

The small parish church, dedicated to St Michael and All Angels, has a finely carved Anglo-Saxon font and two surviving Anglo-Saxon windows in the chancel, which retain their original wooden frames. Its small wooden shingled belfry is underpinned by a late medieval framework of heavy timber. The churchyard contains the gravestone of an Unknown Sailor murdered in 1786.

There have been several military camps in the parish. Between 1922 and 1957 there existed Thursley Camp (from 1941 renamed Tweedsmuir Camp) to the north west of the village which housed British, Canadian and American forces at various times. On 7 November 1942 it was bombed by the Luftwaffe. After the Second World War it was used to house displaced Poles. To the west was Houndown Camp which was used by the British Royal Marines.

== Geography ==
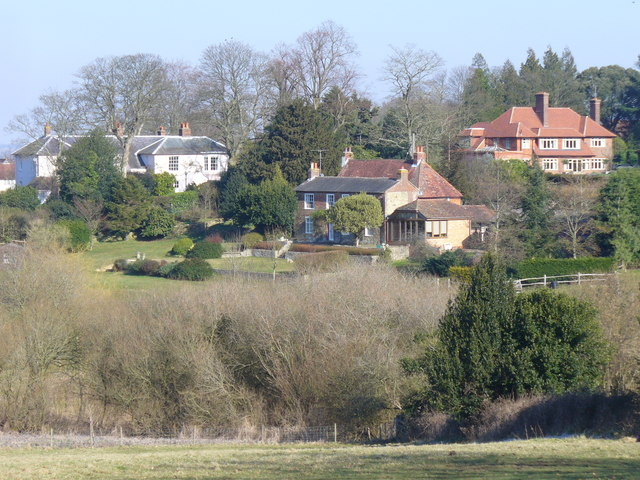
Larger houses in Thursley are where the Greensand Ridge commences

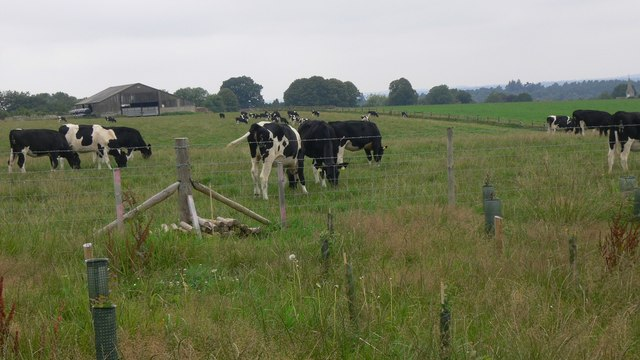
Rich and fertile soil supports arable farming, or grass-supported dairy farming

The north of the parish is mostly Thursley Nature Reserve, a sandy and seasonally marshy Site of Special Scientific Interest, the lowest part of a larger area of uncultivated open land made up of the remainder of Thursley Common and of Witley Common. Across the A3 is the main hillside neighbourhood of Thursley, Bowlhead Green, which has an underpass path crossing directly between the two on the Greensand Way. The two are also connected via one of the largest junctions of the A3 road in the north of the parish, in terms of its multiple slip roads, which facilitate access for the Ministry of Transport to the restricted land to the far north, Hankley Common.

== Wildlife ==
Thursley Common is a national nature reserve and SSSI. It is one of the last surviving areas of lowland peat bog in southern Britain, and at 350 hectares, one of the largest remaining fragments of heathland. It provides a particularly rich habitat for dragonflies and damselflies, along with many other species including the endangered woodlark and Dartford warbler. In July 2006 during a heat wave that affected southern England, 60% of the common was burnt. In May 2020 there was another common fire affecting 150 hectares.

== Notable residents ==
- James Anderson, actor
- Mary Bennett, principal of St Hilda's College, Oxford
- Monica Edwards wrote the Punch Bowl Farm series at the eponymous farm from 1947 to 1970. Thereafter she and her husband lived in a retirement bungalow built in one of its fields.
- H. A. L. Fisher was an English historian, educator, and Liberal politician. He served as president of the Board of Education in David Lloyd George's 1916 to 1922 coalition government. He was also warden of New College, Oxford, from 1925 to 1940.
- Lettice Fisher founded the National Council for the Unmarried Mother and her Child, now known as Gingerbread. Both Lettice Fisher and Mary Bennett died at Rock Cottage in Thursley.
- Sir Edwin Lutyens, architect, grew up in the village where some of his earliest work is to be found. While making use of modern concrete for large spaces, exemplified by his bridges, his churches and homes incorporated methods of traditional timber framing, long tile or slate roofs, distinctive eaves or in appropriately grand settings Bargate or Bath stone. The inspiration was walking in the surrounding area that he developed his love and appreciation of vernacular (authentic Arts and Crafts) buildings, in particular their woodwork, fenestration, tiling and materials.
- Sir Roger Stevens, diplomat and Vice-Chancellor of the University of Leeds
- Roger Taylor (Queen drummer) lived at Millhanger from 1979 to 2003.
- Margaret Louisa Woods, writer

== Demography and housing ==
2011 Census Homes
Output area	Detached	Semi-detached	Terraced	Flats and apartments	Caravans/temporary/mobile homes	shared between households
(Civil Parish)	165	49	13	15	35	0

The average level of accommodation in the region composed of detached houses was 28 per cent, the average that was apartments was 22.6 per cent.

2011 Census Key Statistics
Output area	Population	Households	% Owned outright	% Owned with a loan	hectares
(Civil Parish)	651	277	53.4%	25.6%	1,985

The proportion of households in the civil parish who owned their home outright compares to the regional average of 35.1 per cent. The proportion who owned their home with a loan compares to the regional average of 32.5 per cent. The remaining percentage is made up of rented dwellings (plus a negligible percentage of households living rent-free).

== Bibliography ==
- Buckley, G. B. (1935). Fresh Light on 18th Century Cricket. Birmingham: Cotterell & Co. OCLC 23450280.
