= Monica Edwards =

English children's writer

- Edwards in 1966 (back cover, The Badgers of Punchbowl Farm)
- Born: Monica le Doux Newton; 8 November 1912; Belper, Derbyshire, United Kingdom
- Died: 18 January 1998 (aged 85); Surrey
- Resting place: Ashes scattered in Vanhurst Copse, Thursley, Surrey, U.K.
- Education: Wakefield Girls' High School (September 1920 – July 1921); St Brandon's School, Bristol (January 1928 – April 1928)
- Occupations: Author, naturalist and farmer
- Spouse: William ("Bill") Ferdinand Edwards
- Writing career
- Period: 1947–1976
- Genres: Young adult fiction, natural history
- Notable works: Wish for a Pony (1947); Storm Ahead (1953); No Going Back (1960); The Badgers of Punchbowl Farm (1966)
- Website: monicaedwards.co.uk

Monica Edwards (née Monica le Doux Newton; 8 November 1912 – 18 January 1998) was an English children's writer of the mid-twentieth century best known for her Romney Marsh and Punchbowl Farm series of children's novels.

== Early life ==
She was born in Belper, Derbyshire on 8 November 1912, the third of four children born to the Reverend Harry and Beryl Newton. The family moved to Wakefield, Yorkshire in 1919. As well as being a vicar, Harry Newton was a diocesan exorcist and often took his children with him when performing exorcisms. In 1927 the family moved to Rye Harbour in Romney Marsh, Sussex where Harry Newton remained as vicar until 1936. The young Monica Newton received a fragmentary formal education: she is known to have attended Wakefield Girls' High School between September 1920 and July 1921 and when the family were living at Rye Harbour she was sent to St Brandon's School, Bristol where she remained for just three months in 1928 before returning to Sussex. She received no further formal education.

== The Mary Stanford disaster ==
In November 1928 Edwards witnessed the capsizing of the supposedly unsinkable Mary Stanford lifeboat in Rye Bay with the loss of all aboard.

The unprecedented mass funeral, which was attended by representatives of King George V, the Government and the Armed Services, was conducted by her father, the Reverend Harry Newton.

Edwards knew all seventeen crew-members personally but was especially close to Charlie Southerden. In a letter to a school friend in January 1930 she described Charlie, who was six years older than she was, as her "boy friend" although the relationship was not public knowledge because of the difference in their age and social class. Much later she wrote a fictional account of the lifeboat disaster in Storm Ahead, published in 1953.

== Marriage ==
Monica Newton married William "Bill" Edwards in November 1933 (two days after her twenty-first birthday) in the face of opposition from both families. Bill was an athletic and charismatic man ten years older than her and a lorry-driver by profession. After living in a variety of places, including Udimore in Sussex; Croft in Leicestershire and Send, near Woking in Surrey, they eventually bought Pitlands Farm (in Thursley, Surrey) at auction in 1947 and renamed it Punch Bowl Farm.

== The Punch Bowl Farm series ==
Between 1947 and 1968 Bill and Monica Edwards gradually built up the near-derelict farm into a thriving dairy concern stocked exclusively with pedigree Jersey cattle. During this time she wrote ten Punchbowl Farm novels with the farm and its surroundings as their setting. Although the real name of the farm was Punch Bowl Farm, the fictional name was contracted to Punchbowl (as was the herd name of the Jersey cattle at the real farm) and Thursley's name was changed to Highnoons for the books. The characters of this series of books were the Thornton family – principally the children Andrea, Dion, Lindsey and Peter. The first book in the series (No Mistaking Corker) was written before the purchase of the farm.

The complete list of Punchbowl Farm novels is:

- No Mistaking Corker (1947)
- Black Hunting Whip (1950)
- Punchbowl Midnight (1951)
- Spirit of Punchbowl Farm (1952)
- The Wanderer (1953)
- Punchbowl Harvest (1954)
- Frenchman's Secret (1956)
- The Cownappers (1958)
- The Outsider (1961)
- Fire in the Punchbowl (1965)
- The Wild One (1967)

The Edwards family's farm life was brought to a close in August 1968 when Bill had a near-fatal tractor accident. The couple eventually sold the farm and built a retirement bungalow for themselves in one of the farm's fields.

== Romney Marsh series ==
Beginning with Wish for a Pony in 1947, Edwards altogether wrote fifteen titles in the Romney Marsh series of novels. These were set in the village of Rye Harbour which was renamed Westling. The Romney Marsh towns of Rye and Winchelsea were also renamed Dunsford and Winklesea respectively. The stories feature many real-life characters (with changed names) which the author remembered from her childhood there, such as the ferryman Jim Decks and the villainous Hookey Galley. The principal characters in the novels are Tamzin Grey, Rissa Birnie, Meryon Fairbrass and Roger Lambert. Tamzin's father, the Reverend Richard Grey, was based on Edwards' father, the Reverend Harry Newton.

The complete list of Romney Marsh novels is:

- Wish for a Pony (1947)
- The Summer of the Great Secret (1948)
- The Midnight Horse (1949)
- The White Riders (1950)
- Cargo of Horses (1951)
- Hidden in a Dream (1952)
- Storm Ahead (1953)
- No Entry (1954)
- The Nightbird (1955)
- Operation Seabird (1957)
- Strangers to the Marsh (1957)
- No Going Back (1960)
- The Hoodwinkers (1962)
- Dolphin Summer (1963)
- A Wind Is Blowing (1969)

== Publishers ==
When she wrote Wish for a Pony Edwards did not realize that finding an agent would be a necessary step to having the story published. Instead she simply sent it to Collins (now HarperCollins), who accepted it for publication. She quickly came to dislike the book:

Monica Edwards wanted to alter much of Wish for a Pony soon after it was published but Collins told her they would only publish her next story (No Mistaking Corker) if Wish for a Pony remained as it was.

All the books in the two series were published by Collins, but abridged versions of some of the titles in both series were published as Armada paperbacks. The non-series book Under The Rose was also published by Collins.

Edwards' chief illustrator was Geoffrey Whittam, although the first four books (Wish for a Pony, No Mistaking Corker, The Summer of the Great Secret and The Midnight Horse) had illustrations by Anne Bullen; Joan Wanklyn illustrated Spirit of Punchbowl Farm, The Wanderer and Punchbowl Harvest, and Charles Tunnicliffe illustrated Punchbowl Midnight.

In the 1980s John Goodchild published new versions of some of the earlier titles. These versions were updated by the author to make them less rooted in the 1950s. However, Goodchild died before Storm Ahead was published and the project was abandoned. Reprints of the original books have been published by Girls Gone By Publishers, starting in 2005 with Storm Ahead.

A biography of Edwards by Brian Parks was published by Girls Gone By Publishers in 2010. Parks also wrote a Companion to the Romney Marsh series of books, which was published in July 2006.

== Selected publications ==
=== Non-series fiction ===
- Killer Dog (1959 – novelization of Monica Edwards' script for the Children's Film Foundation film The Dawn Killer made in 1958)
- Under The Rose (1968)

=== Career fiction ===
(Both titles published by Bodley Head)

- Joan Goes Farming (1954)
- Rennie Goes Riding (1956)

=== Non-fiction ===
(All titles published by Michael Joseph)

- The Unsought Farm (1954)
- The Cats of Punchbowl Farm (1964)
- The Badgers of Punchbowl Farm (1966)
- The Valley and the Farm (1971)
- Badger Valley (1976)

=== Short stories ===
- The Irresponsible Rescue (Collins, 1948)
- Serena Bathover's Horses (Collins, 1948)
- A Sort of Miracle (Collins, 1952)
- The Horse That Came From the Sea (Collins, 1953)
- Such a pony was Gipsy (Collins, 1953)
- Sure Magic (Max Parrish, 1955)
- The Champions (Chambers, 1955)
- The Telegram (Collins, 1955)
- Bird in the Hand (Collins, 1959)
- The Great Horse (Naldrett Press, 1960)
- Caesar's Fire (Collins, 1963)

== Later life ==
Monica Edwards' last new title (Badger Valley) was published in 1976. She spent the next twenty years traveling, reading and studying natural history. Bill Edwards died in October 1990 and Monica died in January 1998.
