= Joseph Henry Ball =

British architect

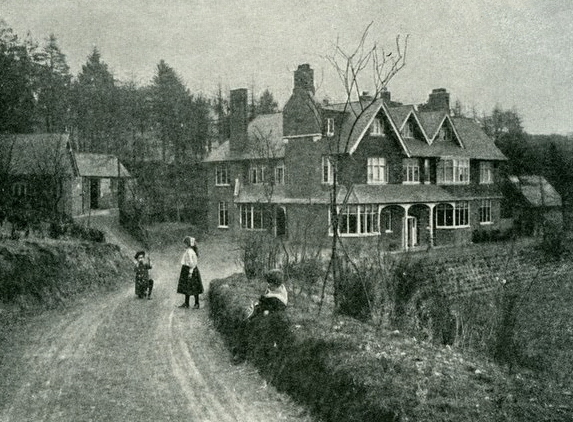
Undershaw c.1900

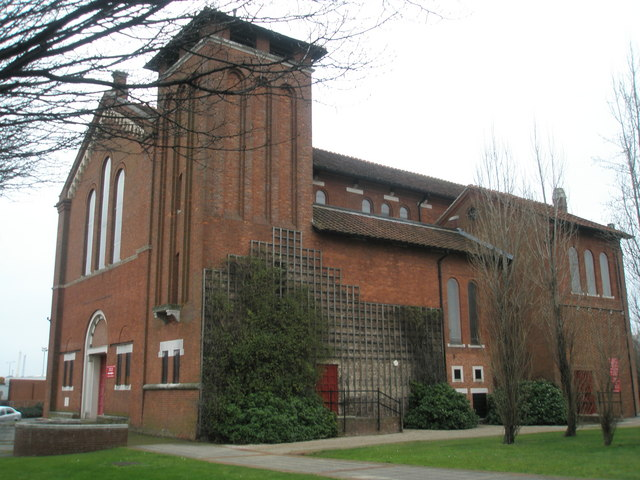
St Agatha's Church, Portsmouth.

Joseph Henry Ball (1861–1931) was a British architect. Among his commissions was Undershaw in Hindhead, Surrey, which was built for the family of the writer Arthur Conan Doyle.

== Early life ==
Joseph Henry Ball was born in Alderley Edge, Cheshire, in 1861.

== Career ==
Ball trained as an architect under Alfred Waterhouse. Among his commissions was St Agatha's Church (1895) in Landport, Portsmouth, a Grade II listed building.

He also designed Undershaw in Hindhead, Surrey, also Grade II listed, for the family of the writer Arthur Conan Doyle.

== Death ==
Ball died in 1931.
