= Beacon Hill (Hindhead, Surrey) =

Village in Surrey, England

Coordinates: 51.1222°N 0.7529°W

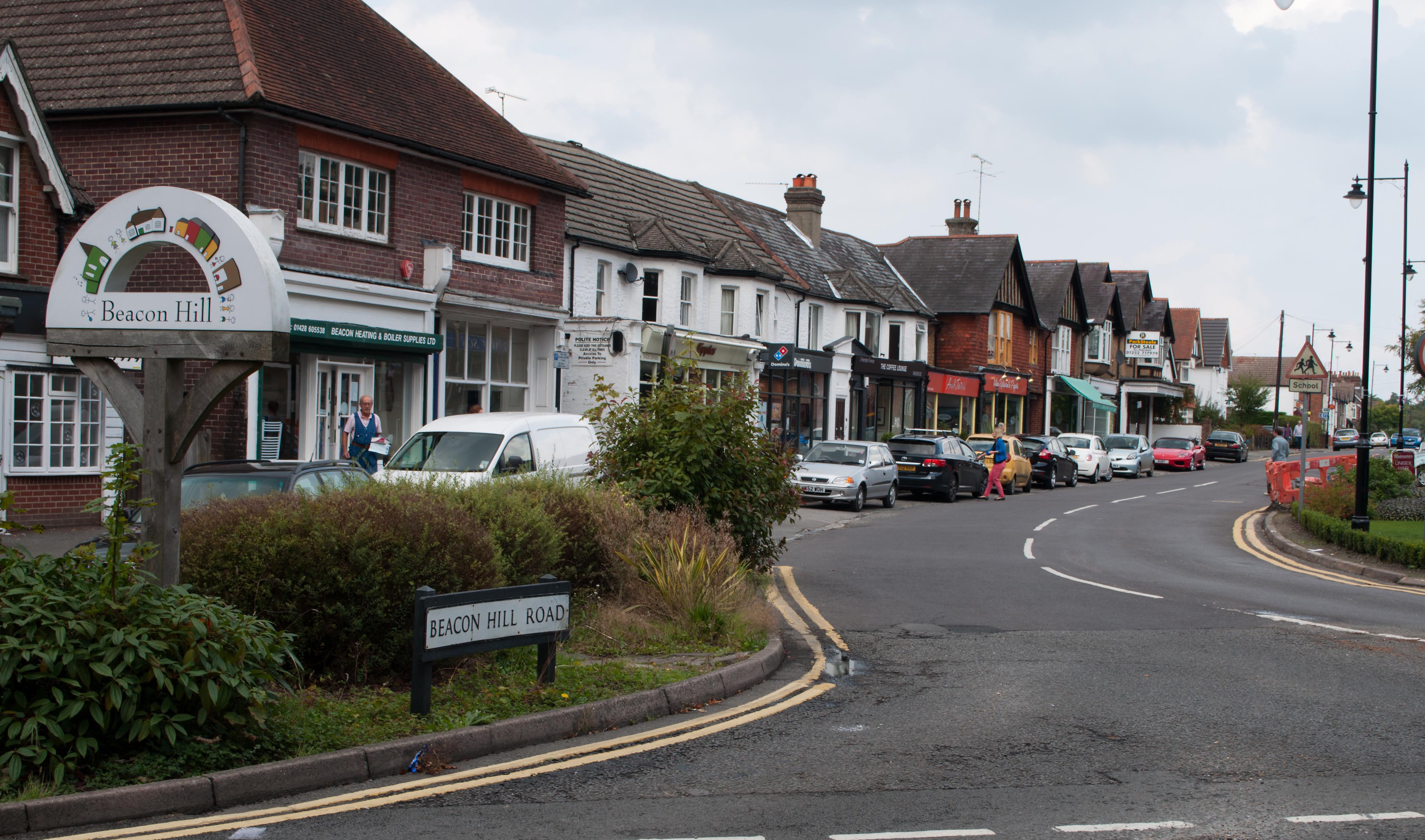
- The village centre

- Location within Surrey
- OS grid reference: SU883366
- Civil parish: Haslemere
- District: Waverley
- Shire county: Surrey
- Region: South East
- Country: England
- Sovereign state: United Kingdom
- Post town: Hindhead
- Postcode district: GU26
- Dialling code: 01428
- Police: Surrey
- Fire: Surrey
- Ambulance: South East Coast
- UK Parliament: Farnham and Bordon

Beacon Hill, while administratively and ecclesiastically part of Hindhead, Surrey, is a discrete settlement with its own history, amenities and character. It lies in the southwest corner of Surrey on the A287 road between the towns of Haslemere and Farnham. The village began to be developed in the 19th century.

Beacon Hill has three churches, a primary school, a shopping area and a range of sporting facilities and activities, as well as public transport in the form of a bus service from Aldershot to Haslemere.

== Geography ==
Beacon Hill lies principally between two main roads to the north-west of Hindhead: the A287 Haslemere to Farnham road and the Tilford Road, an alternative and more rural route from Hindhead to Farnham via the village of Tilford. The nearest village to the north-west is Churt.

== History ==
Beacon Hill is so-named because it was originally one of many beacon sites across England. The area began to be settled in the 19th century when people who could afford it built houses there to take advantage of the clean environment. John Tyndall declared the air to be as pure as that in the Swiss alps.

The Woodcock Inn served as Beacon Hill's only public house from the early 20th century until it closed in about 2008 and was subsequently demolished for housing.

== Amenities ==
=== Worship ===
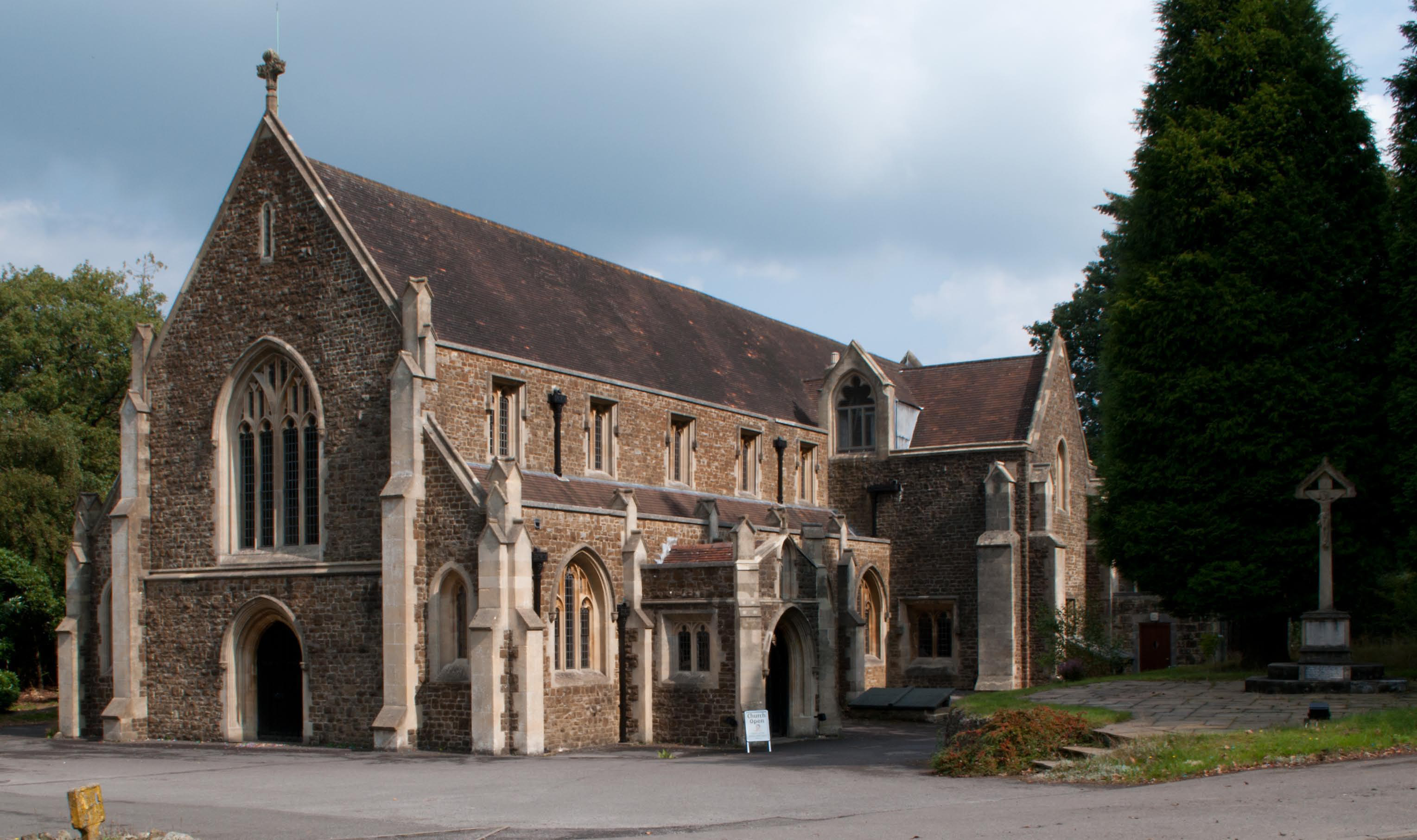
St Alban's Church and the village war memorial

- The Church of England parish church, St Alban's Church, is part of the Joint Benefice of Churt (St John's) and Hindhead, in the Anglican Diocese of Guildford. It is a Grade II listed building. In 1904 a temporary mission church was built to serve the new community. An architectural competition to design a permanent church was held in 1906, and John Duke Coleridge was chosen as the architect. The first phase, comprising the chancel, north chapel, transept and the lower stage of a projected bell tower, was completed by 1907, and the church gained its own parish in the same year. A series of windows by the Arts and Crafts designers Karl Parsons and Christopher Whall were installed in the unfinished church between 1908 and 1912. The three eastern bays of the nave were consecrated in 1915, but the two western bays were not built until 1929–31; the bell-tower was never completed and became in effect a south transept. There followed two additional stained-glass windows: by Christopher Webb in 1945 and by Francis Skeat in 1950. A large vestry extension was added in 1964. A fire in 1999 destroyed the original high altar and reredos paintings.
- St Anselm's Roman Catholic Church is in the Catholic Parish of Haslemere, Hindhead and Chiddingfold. The church was established on its present site in the 1950s.
- United Reformed Church (formerly Beacon Hill Congregational Church) was, in 1905, the first church to be built in Beacon Hill; it was built by London developer John Grover. Major refurbishment was carried out post-2005 to include meeting rooms and The Hub Coffee Bar incorporating computer, printing and wi-fi facilities.

=== Education ===
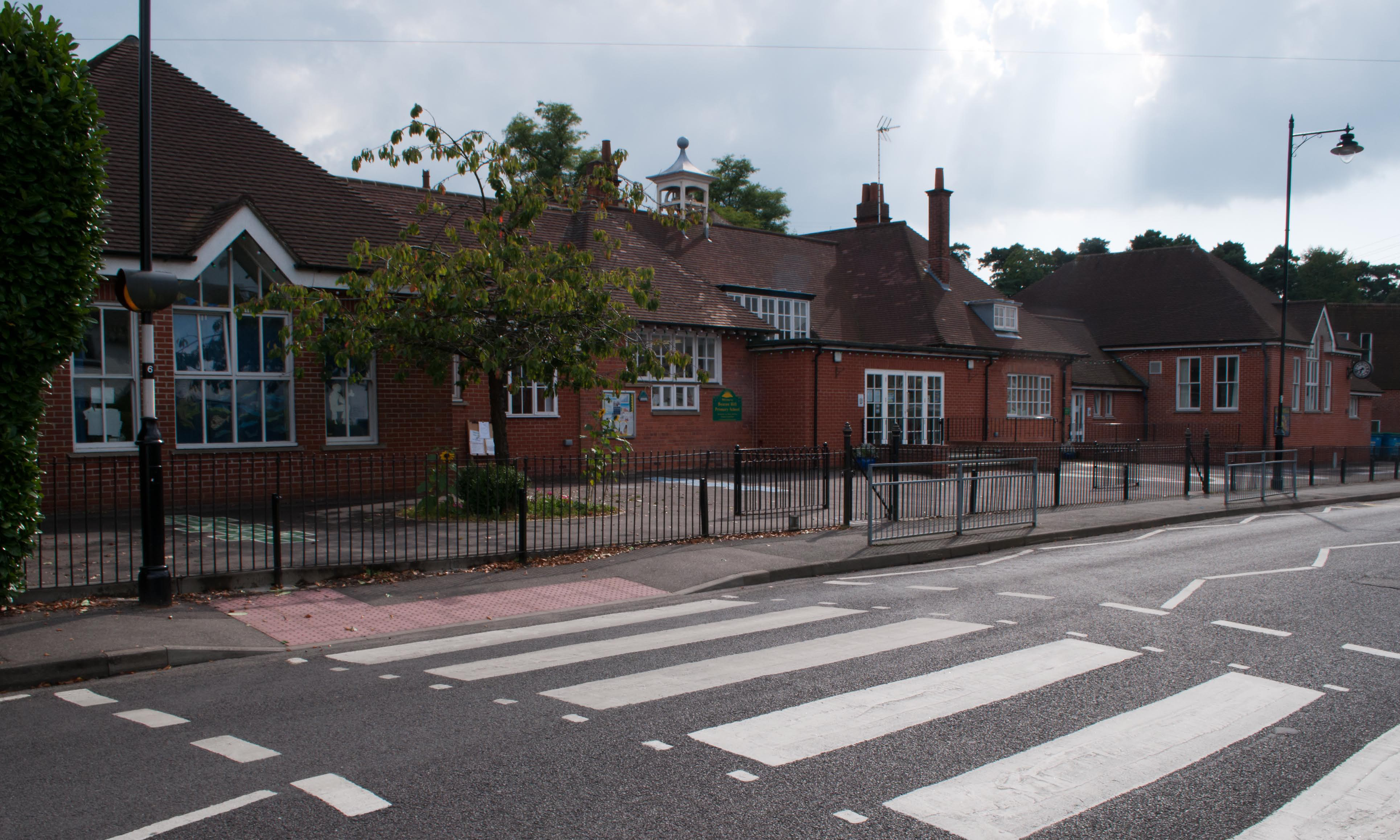
Beacon Hill School

Beacon Hill Community Primary School is a secular school occupying two sites in the village with 206 pupils aged 4 to 11 in 2023. In 2024 it became an academy school.

=== Scouting ===
Hindhead Scouts and Guides for many years met in a hut in Cricket Close built in about 1923. In 2013 efforts were begun to raise funds for a new building with an estimated cost of £50,000.

=== Royal British Legion Club ===
Hindhead Royal British Legion Club has stood in Beacon Hill Road since the early 20th century, hosts numerous events throughout the year and has sport and leisure facilities including a floodlit tennis court, bowls, darts and snooker.

=== Marchants Hill ===
Marchants Hill camp, built in 1939 by the National Camps Corporation, was used in the Second World War to accommodate child evacuees from East Ham in London. The camp continued as a holiday and adventure venue for city children after the war and in 2025 was run by the activity holiday company PGL Ltd, on the 45 acres (18 ha) site.

=== Sport ===
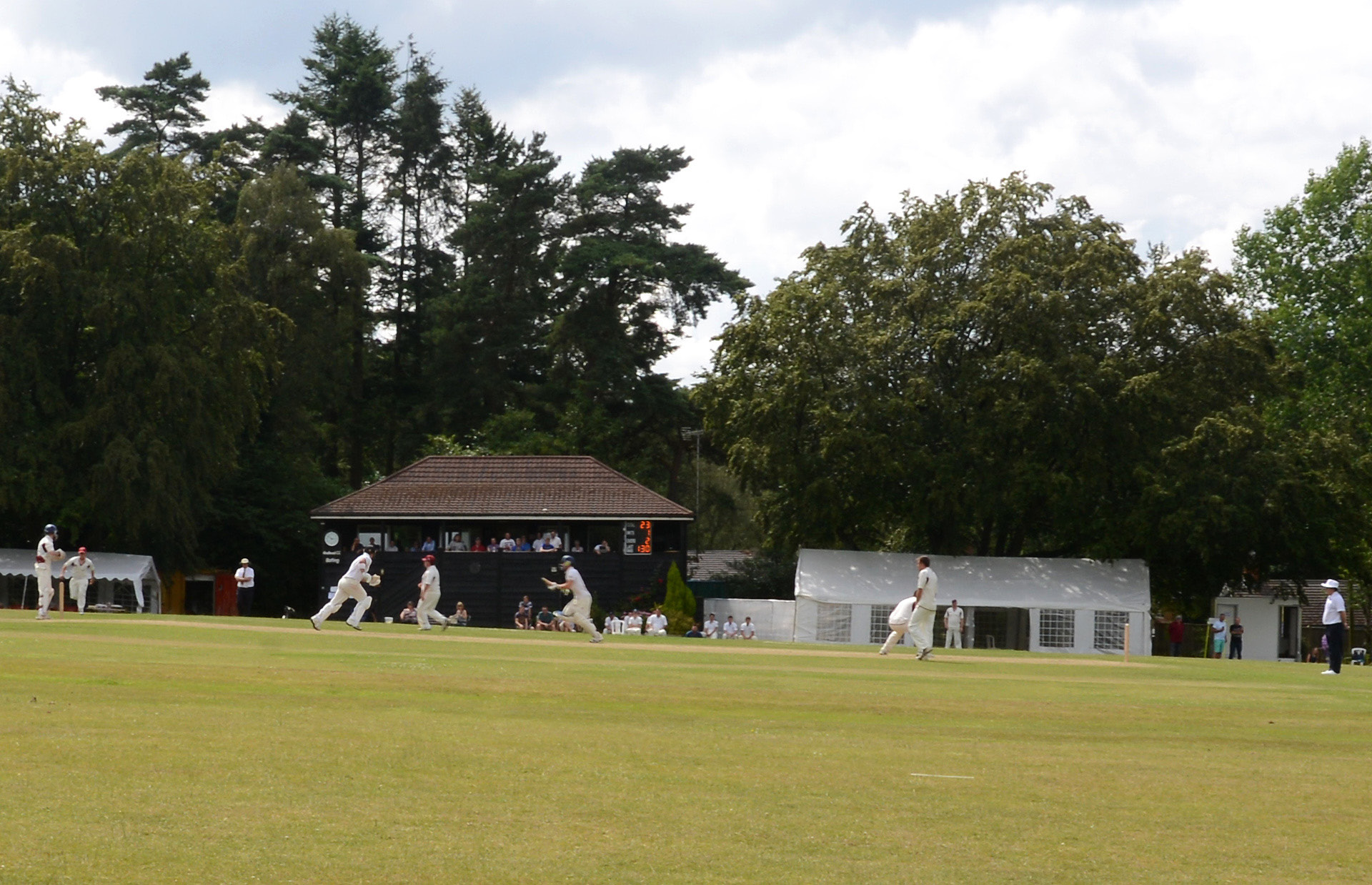
Hindhead Cricket Club 2014

The playing fields at Marchants Hill are home to Hindhead Athletic Football Club, Beacon Hill Junior Football Club and Hindhead Cricket Club. The cricket ground hosted two international women's cricket matches in the 1950s: Molly Hide's XI against Australia Women in 1951 and South Women Second XI against New Zealand Women in 1954.

Hindhead Golf Course and Club was established in 1904. One of its founders and first president was Sir Arthur Conan Doyle who lived at Hindhead at the time. Numerous notable people have been members over the years, including Peter Alliss who lived nearby.

Hindhead Tennis Club's home is at the Royal British Legion Club; the courts have floodlighting.

=== Shops and events ===
- Shopping centre. The principal locality for shops is Beacon Hill Road.
- Beacon Hill Beer Festival is held over 2 days in May at Hindhead Royal British Legion Club in Beacon Hill Road; 2024 was its 20th year.

== Notable people ==
- Rodney Porter (1917–1985), biochemist, was killed in a road accident near Beacon Hill.
- Humphrey Trevelyan, Baron Trevelyan (1905 –1985), diplomat and writer, was born at the parsonage in Tilford Road.
