= Hindhead =

Village in Surrey, England

Coordinates: 51.1172°N 0.7348°W

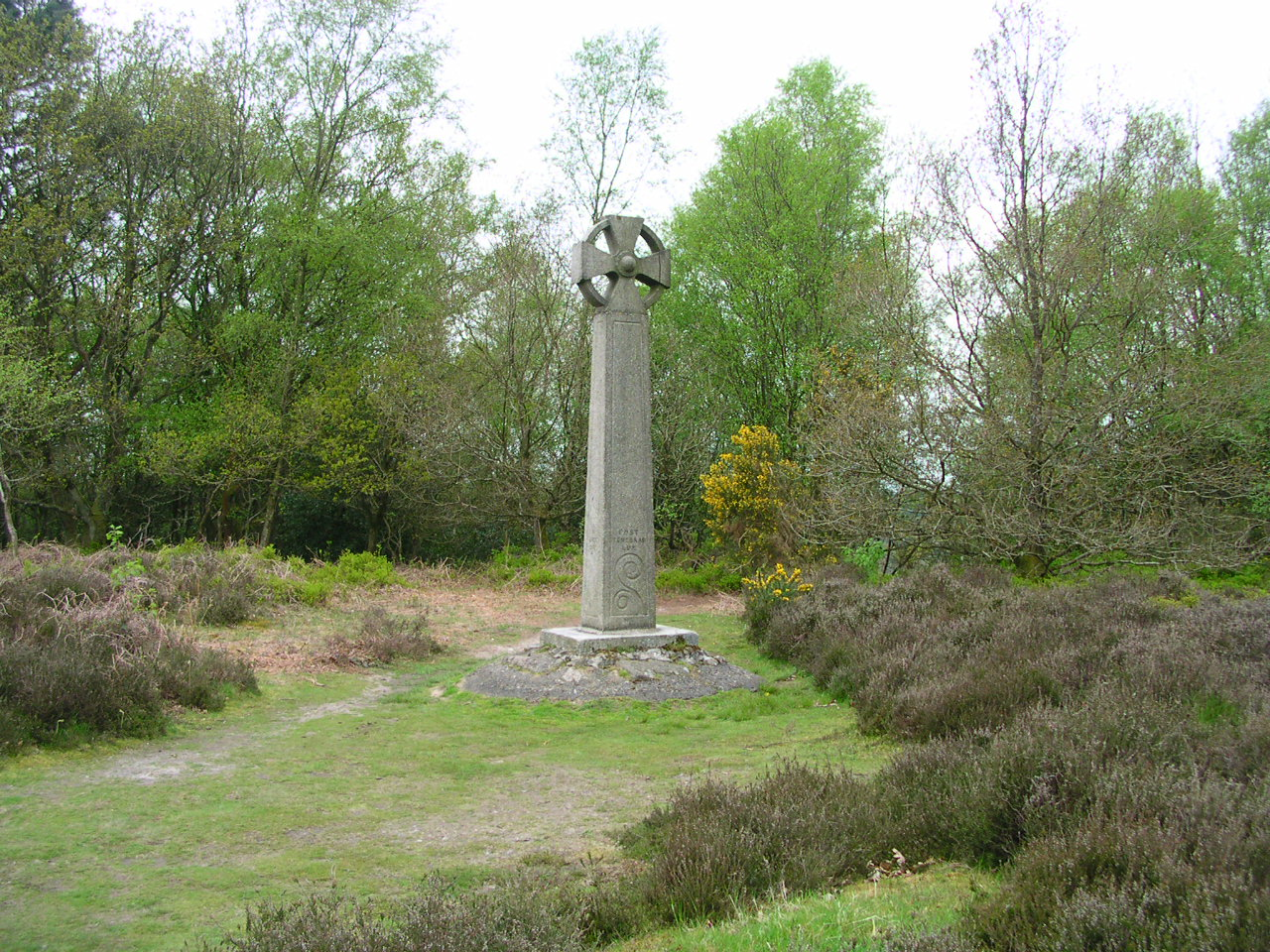
- Gibbet Hill, Hindhead

- Location within Surrey
- Population: 3,874; 4,292 (2011 Census. Ward)
- OS grid reference: SU886360
- Civil parish: Haslemere
- District: Waverley
- Shire county: Surrey
- Region: South East
- Country: England
- Sovereign state: United Kingdom
- Post town: HINDHEAD
- Postcode district: GU26
- Dialling code: 01428
- Police: Surrey
- Fire: Surrey
- Ambulance: South East Coast
- UK Parliament: Farnham and Bordon

Hindhead is a village in the Waverley district of the county of Surrey, England. It is the highest village in the county and its buildings are between 185 metres (607 ft) and 253 metres (830 ft) above sea level. The village forms part of the Haslemere parish. Situated on the county border with Hampshire, it is best known as the location of the Devil's Punch Bowl, a beauty spot and site of special scientific interest.

The A3 between Portsmouth and London was crossed by the A287 between Hook and Haslemere. The A3 now passes under Hindhead in the Hindhead Tunnel and its route along the Punch Bowl has been removed and landscaped, but the crossroads still exists for local traffic, as a double mini-roundabout. Hindhead is 11 miles (18 km) south-west of Guildford and on the border with Hampshire. It is a ward in the district of Waverley, and part of the civil parish of Haslemere. The ward, which includes Beacon Hill, had a population of 4,292 at the 2011 Census. The name "Hindhead" is first attested in 1571, and means "hill frequented by hinds", or female deer.

== Geography ==
=== Land use, elevations and soil types ===
The settled parts of the village are elevated relative to all of the surrounding parishes and are a mixture of paved streets and wooded roads as well as agricultural smallholdings, which are few compared with other parts of Waverley District. Hindhead has the 2nd and 13th highest hills in Surrey: Gibbet Hill and Hatch Farm Hill, at 272 metres (892 ft) and 211 metres (692 ft) above sea level respectively. These rise gradually from the rest of the village towards the north of the Greensand Ridge, upon which the village wholly lies. The soil is near its surface a sort of crumbly sandstone here known as greensand which breaks up forest into acidic heathland in many places. It supports endemic types of fungi, ferns, gorse and heather.

=== Features ===
The north of the village forms the Devil's Punch Bowl, a large wooded beauty spot and a site of special scientific interest. Much of the north and east of the village is rolling woodland which forms part of the Surrey Hills Area of Outstanding Natural Beauty.

== History ==
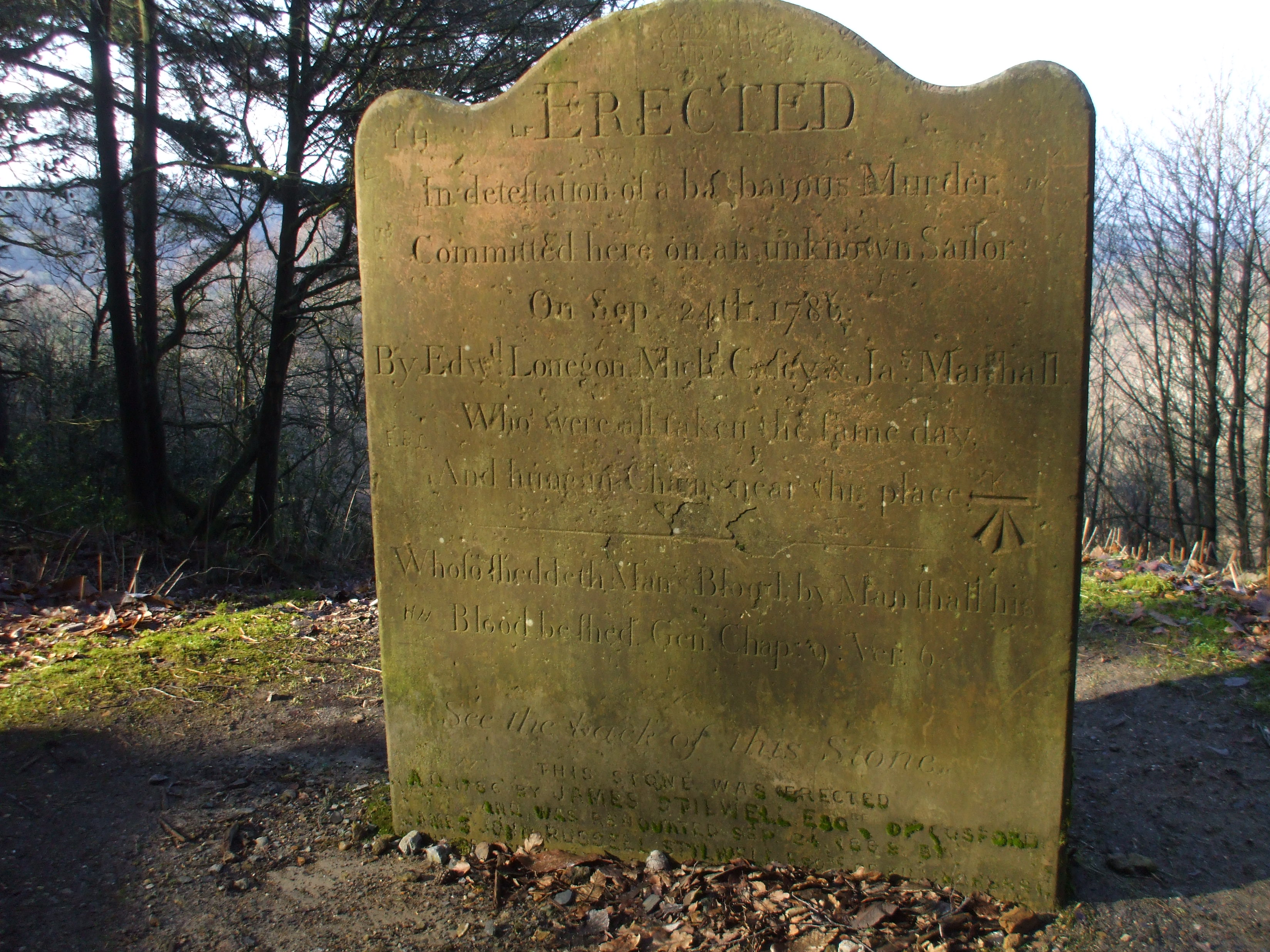
Stone commemorating the murder of an unknown sailor on Hindhead Common

This area was notorious for highwaymen. In 1736, Stephen Phillips, a robber tried and convicted at the Old Bailey, admitted to the Newgate chaplain to having stolen 150 guineas in gold on the road towards London. In 1786, three men were convicted of the murder of an unknown sailor on his way from London to rejoin his ship, a deed commemorated by several memorials in the area. The perpetrators were hung in chains to warn others on Gibbet Hill, a short walk away on top of the Devil's Punch Bowl. With an increase in traffic and opening of the London to Portsmouth railway line removing much of the road transport of freight, such incidents reduced during the 19th century.

Hindhead became a substantial settlement in the late 19th century. In 1904 a temporary mission church was built to serve the new community. An architectural competition to design a permanent church, that of St Alban's in Beacon Hill, was held in 1906, and J. D. Coleridge (1879–1934) was chosen as the architect. The first phase, comprising the chancel, north chapel, transept, and the lower stage of a projected bell tower, was completed by 1907, and the new church was given its own parish in the same year. A series of windows by the Arts and Crafts designers Karl Parsons and Christopher Whall were installed in the unfinished church between 1908 and 1912. The three eastern bays of the nave were consecrated in 1915, but the two western bays were not built until 1929–31; the bell-tower was never completed and became in effect a south transept. There followed two additional stained-glass windows: by Christopher Webb in 1945 and by Francis Skeat in 1950. A large vestry extension was added in 1964. A fire in 1999 destroyed the original high altar and reredos paintings.

In World War 2, an RAF radar station (RAF Hindhead) was operational on Gibbet Hill from March 1942; the station was the scene of a military aircraft crash in May 1945.

== Notable people ==
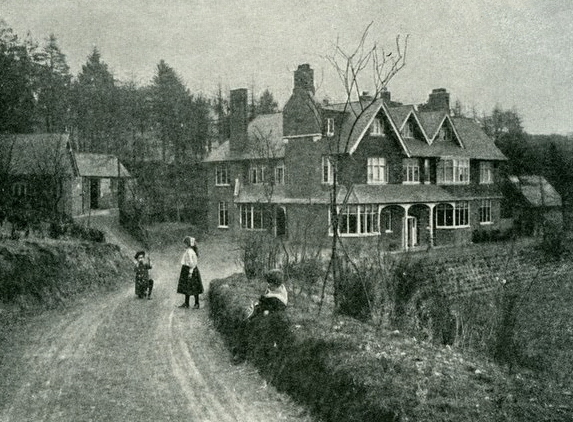
Undershaw in Conan Doyle's day

- Grant Allen (1848–1899), the Canadian-born novelist, lived at "Hilltop". Conan Doyle was one of Allen's neighbours and became his friend; he completed Allen's novel Hilda Wade after Allen's death.
- Peter Alliss (1931–2020), professional golfer and commentator, lived in Hindhead.
- Jodie Burrage (born 1999), tennis player, comes from Hindhead.
- Sir Arthur Conan Doyle (1859–1930) lived at "Undershaw" from 1897 to 1907. Here he wrote some of his best-known novels, including The Hound of the Baskervilles. Undershaw later became a hotel and restaurant, but this closed in 2004 and the property is now a school. Conan Doyle was Hindhead Golf Club's first President in 1904.
- Colonel William Eagleson Gordon (1866–1941) Victoria Cross recipient, died at Hindhead.
- Miss James (1830–1910) built and lived at West Down, donating land to the National Trust which now features Miss James' Walk and the Miss James footbridge over the A3 road.
- Field Marshal Sir Bernard Montgomery (1887–1976) took the title of "Viscount Montgomery of Alamein, of Hindhead in the County of Surrey" when he was raised to the peerage in 1946.
- Playwright George Bernard Shaw (1856–1950) lived at "Blen Cathra" in Hindhead, now the site of St Edmund's School.
- Diplomat and writer Humphrey Trevelyan (1905–1985) was born at the parsonage in Hindhead.
- The scientist John Tyndall (1820–1893) lived and died at "Tyndalls", now known as "Hindhead House". He is best known for his work on the discovery of the greenhouse effect.

== Government ==
For the purposes of local government, Hindhead is within the civil parish of Haslemere, the district of Waverley and the county of Surrey. Hindhead forms a ward for elections to Haslemere Town Council and Waverley Borough Council, and is part of the Waverley Western Villages electoral division for Surrey County Council elections. The ward elects a single county councillor, two district councillors and five town councillors.

Hindhead is within the UK constituency of Farnham and Bordon and was in the European constituency of South East England.

== Transport ==
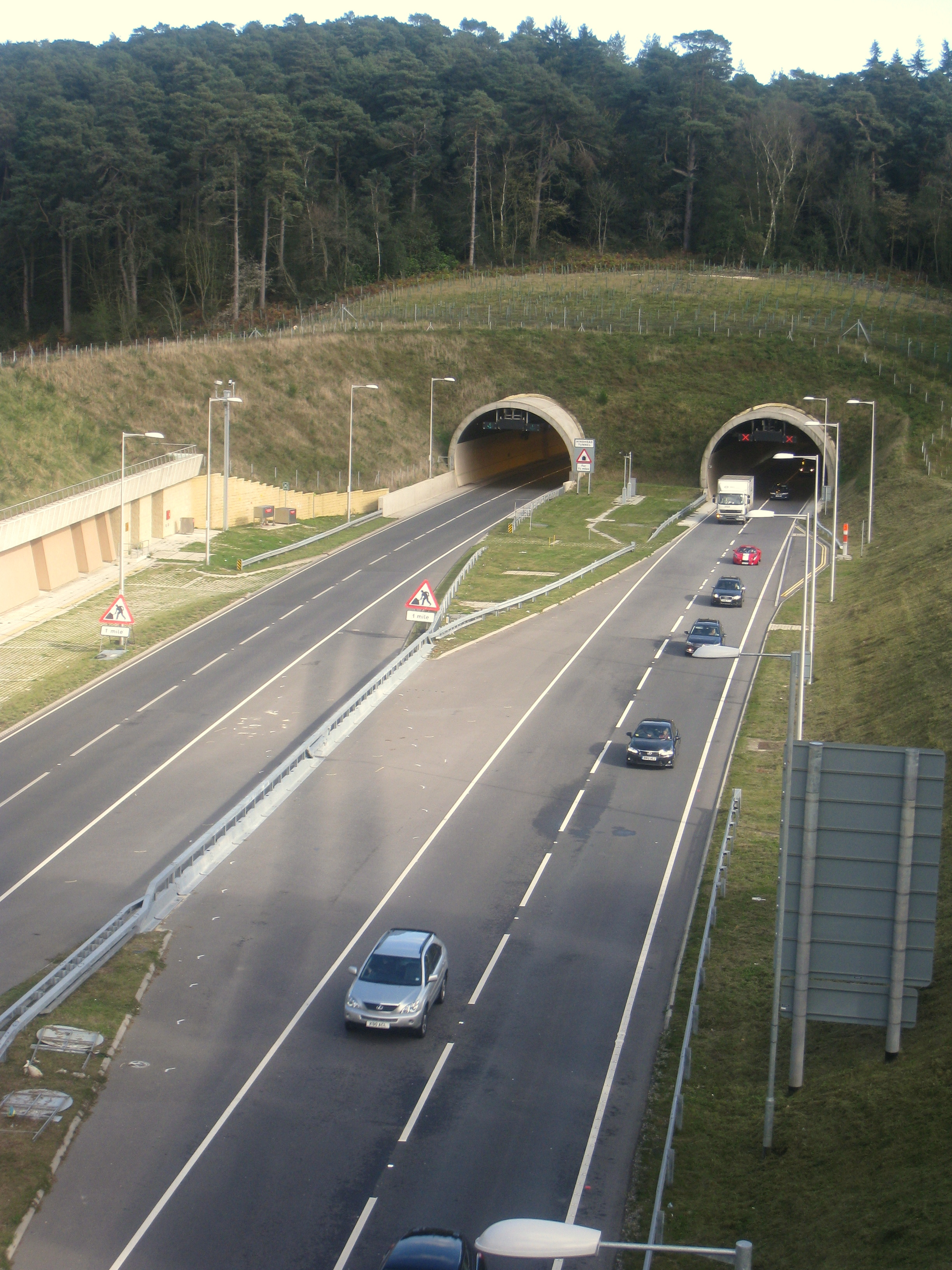
The southern portal of the Hindhead Tunnel

Until 2011, Hindhead village was situated on the main A3 road between London and Portsmouth. In that year, a £371 million bypass was completed, reducing the amount of traffic passing through the village. The bypass includes the 1.9-mile (3.1 km) twin-bore tunnel, the longest non-estuarial road tunnel in the UK.

The village is served by the A287, between Hook and Haslemere, and the A333, a stretch of the former A3 that links the village south to the new bypass. The section of the old A3 north of Hindhead and alongside the Devil's Punch Bowl has been returned to tree-interspersed heathland.

The nearest railway station is at Haslemere, 2.6 miles (4.2 km) away, on the Portsmouth Direct Line between London Waterloo and Portsmouth Harbour stations. Hindhead is served by Stagecoach South bus routes linking nearby towns and villages such as Farnham, Bordon and Haslemere, and National Express Coaches between Portsmouth and London (although this has now been withdrawn).

== Nearest settlements ==
Neighbouring settlements are Beacon Hill (administratively part of Hindhead, while geographically separate) and Grayshott village. The town of Haslemere is 2 miles (3.2 km) to the southeast, whilst the considerably larger town of Guildford is 10.5 miles (16.9 km) to the north-east. London is 38 miles (61 km) to the north-east.

== See also ==
- List of places of worship in Waverley (borough)
