= Miss James =

English philanthropist

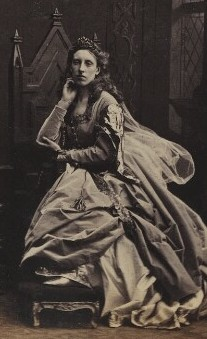
- Miss James in 1866
- Born: Marian Julia James; 7 August 1830
- Died: 10 November 1910 (aged 80)
- Known for: Miss James' Walk, Miss James footbridge

Marian Julia James (7 August 1830 – 10 November 1910), also known as Miss James, was an English philanthropist. She inherited money from a friend and built a house in Hindhead, Surrey. Land she gave to the National Trust is crossed by Miss James' Walk and in 2009, the Miss James footbridge was constructed across the A3 road.

== Life ==
Marian Julia James was born on 7 August 1830. She lived in London, boarding in a house with her mother and Miss Emily Coates. In 1888, James became wealthy when her friend Coates died, leaving her an inheritance of around £80,000 (equivalent to £11,300,000 in 2023). She then moved to Hindhead in Surrey, buying wooded land and building a house called West Down where she lived with the Bulley family. Between 1892 and 1896, architect George Faulkner Armitage constructed the home along with a coach house and stable, dovecotes and some cottages for the gardeners. James gave some of the land she had bought to the National Trust, which continues to manage it.

== Death and legacy ==
Miss James died on 10 November 1910. She left an estate of £92,240 (equivalent to £13,000,000 in 2023). Among her bequests, she gave West Down to Margaret Hattersley Bulley. She also gave money to churches, hospitals and the Bramshott Chase Hostel, a place set up for single people to have respite care.

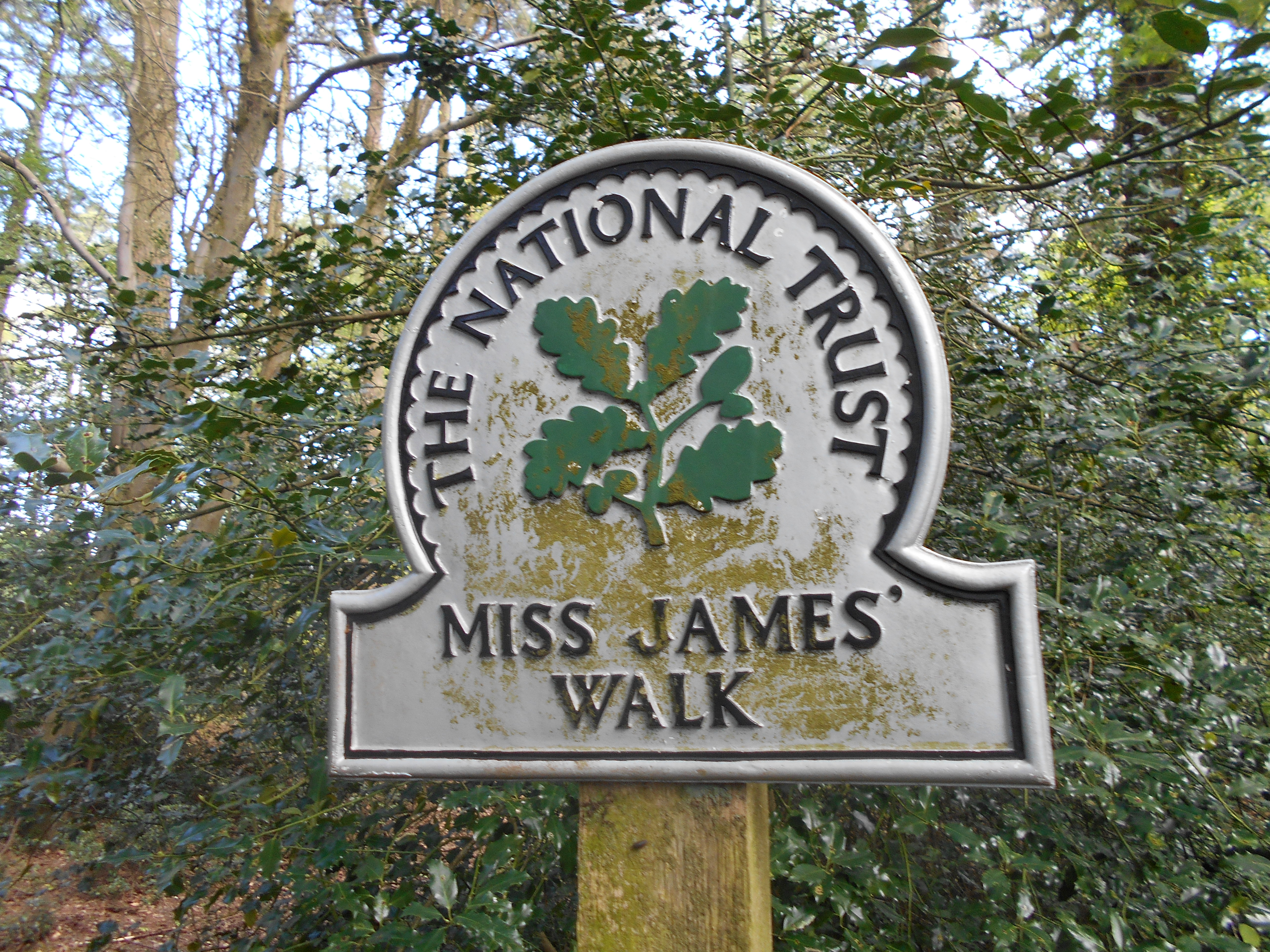
Sign for Miss James' Walk

On the land she gave to the National Trust is a path, Miss James' Walk, through Nutcombe Valley. The Hindhead Tunnel and approaches enable the A3 road to undershoot its old route along the upper lip of the Devil's Punch Bowl, a Site of Special Scientific Interest. The south approach cuts the Walk. From the beginning of the planning process, the National Trust thus asked for a bridge, a spokesperson saying "We know how important this access between Tyndall's Wood and the rest of Nutcombe Valley will be". The Miss James footbridge was completed in 2009. It is earth-lain and provides a crossing for animals, pedestrians and horse riders.
