= Hindhead Tunnel =

Road Tunnel in Hindhead, Surrey, England

Coordinates: 51.1109°N 0.7322°W

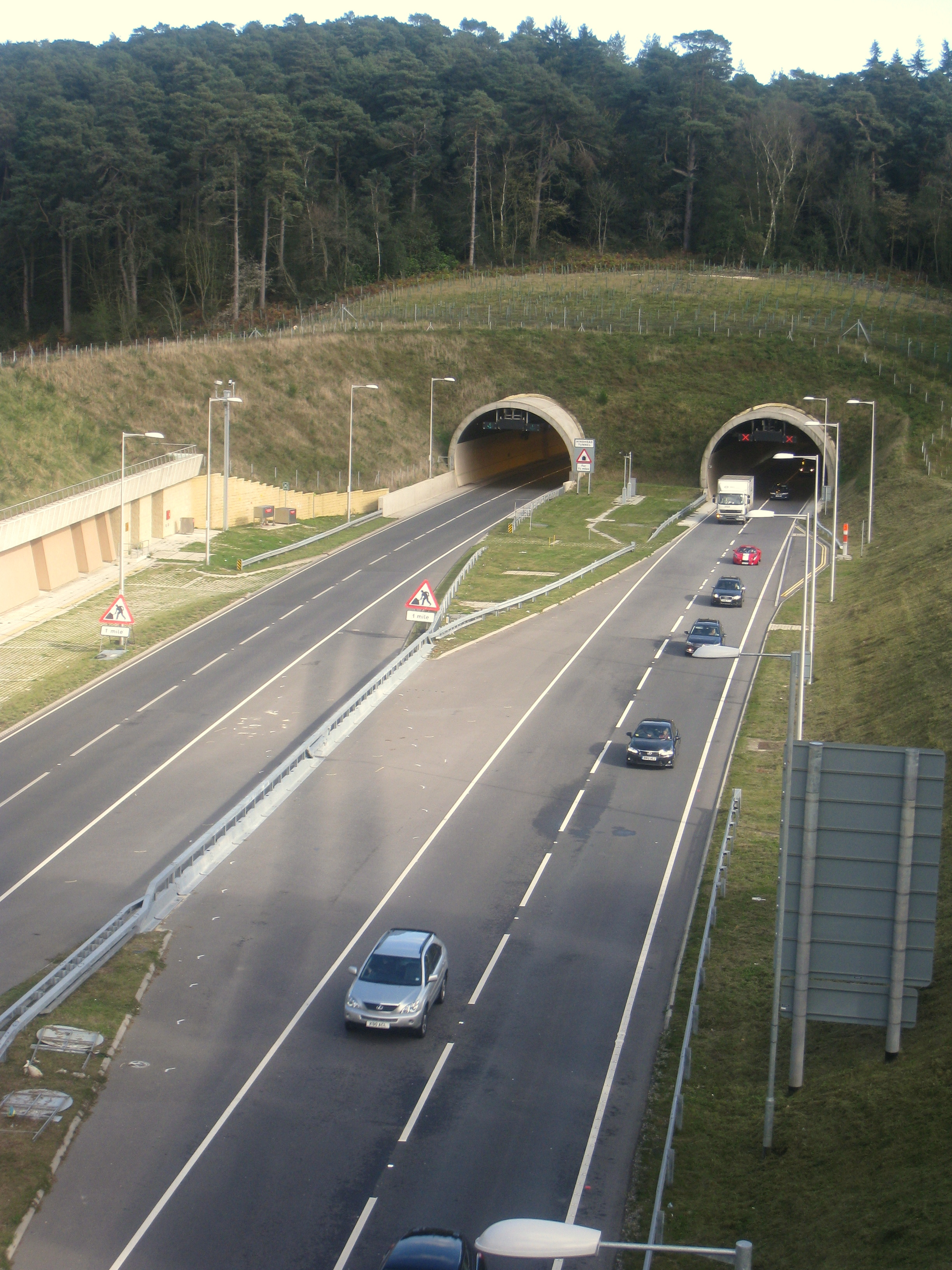
- South portal of the Hindhead Tunnel. October 2012
- Interactive map of Hindhead Tunnel

Overview
- Location: Hindhead, Surrey, UK
- Status: Active
- Route: A3

Operation
- Work began: January 2007
- Opened: 29 July 2011
- Owner: National Highways
- Operator: National Highways

Technical
- Length: 1,830 m (1.14 mi; 6,000 ft)
- No. of lanes: Two in each tunnel
- Operating speed: Speed limit: 70 mph (113 km/h); Design speed: 120 km/h (75 mph)

The Hindhead Tunnel, opened in 2011, is part of the 4-mile (6.4 km) dual carriageway that replaced one of the last remaining stretches of single carriageway on the A3 road which connects the cities of London and Portsmouth. It was built to bypass the village of Hindhead in Surrey. At 1.14 miles (1.83 km) in length, the tunnel is the longest non-estuarial road tunnel in the United Kingdom, and takes the road beneath the Devil's Punch Bowl, a Site of Special Scientific Interest.

== History ==
A naval dockyard has existed in Portsmouth since at least Tudor times, giving significant importance to the road linking that city with London. The original 73-mile (117 km) route skirted the north-western limits of The Weald climbing to the summit of Gibbet Hill close to Hindhead. In 1826 the road was rebuilt around the Devil's Punch Bowl to ensure that the gradient was no more than 5%. The road became part of the A3 when road numbering was introduced in the 1920s.

By the start of the new millennium most of the A3 had been dualled; of the route from Southfields to Havant, only the section that passed through Hindhead and the Devil's Punch Bowl was still single carriageway. This section, which passed through an Area of Outstanding Natural Beauty (AONB), operated at or above capacity for much of the day and had an accident rate 40% higher than the national average for that class of road.

== Design ==
By 2000 the A3 between Southfields and Havant had been built to dual carriageway standards for its entire length apart from the 3.4-mile (5.5 km) Hindhead section (there are still sections of single carriageway within London and Portsmouth). The termini of the northern and southern sections of dual carriageway were at altitudes of 180 m (590 ft) and 190 m (620 ft) above sea level respectively and the single carriageway linking them followed a winding route around the Devil's Punch Bowl, reaching an altitude of 260 m (850 ft). The Hindhead Tunnel project shortened the route by about 300 m (980 ft) and routed the road through a tunnel whose northern and southern portals are at altitudes of 190 m (620 ft) and 200 m (660 ft) above sea level respectively.

=== Assessment of proposals ===
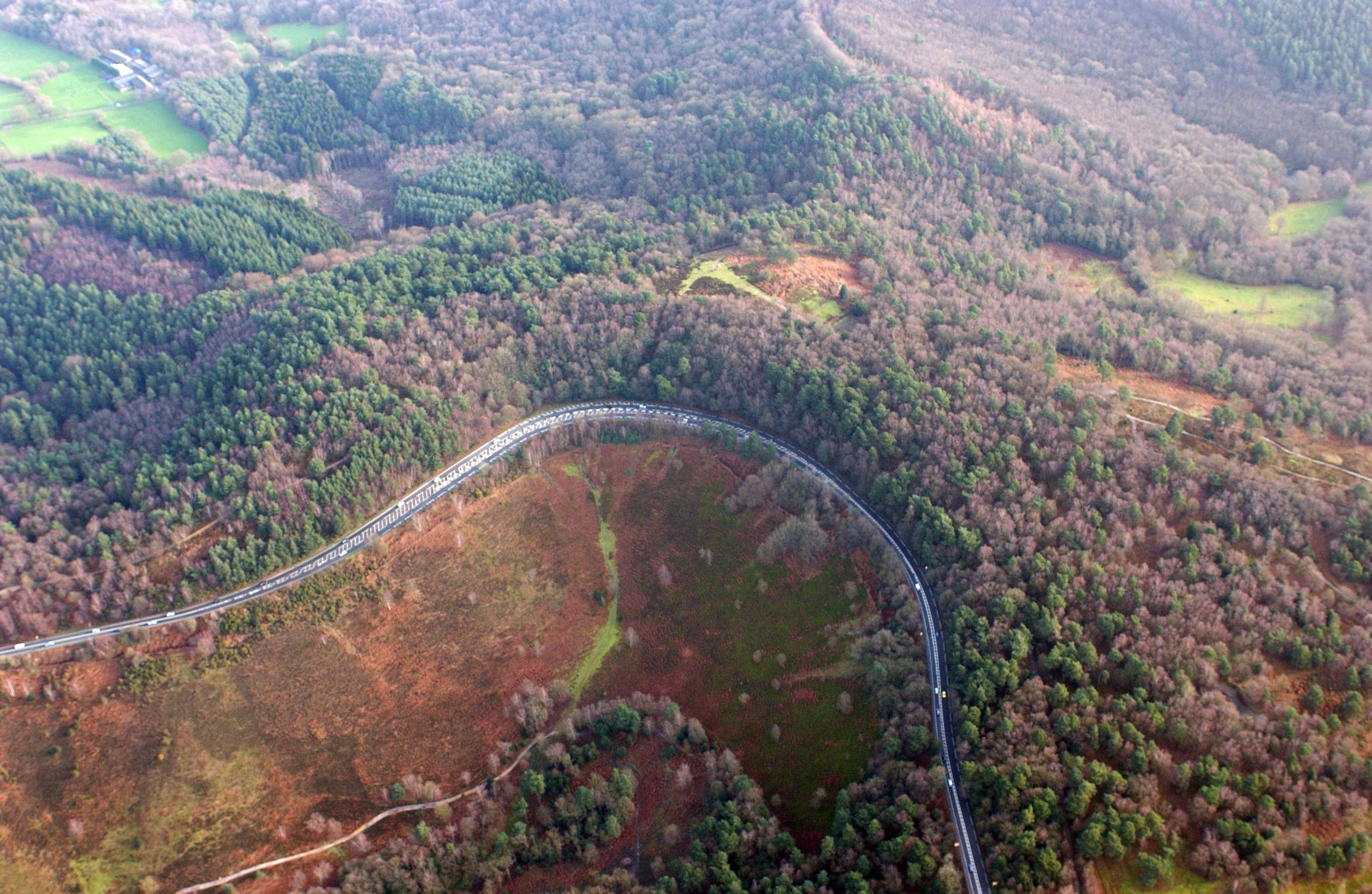
Aerial view of the Devil's Punch Bowl, before the closure of the old A3.

The need for improvements to the A3 through Hindhead had been recognised for many years with a route study being undertaken between 1970 and 1976. In 1983 some nine alternatives for the A3 were investigated by the Department for Transport, but assessment showed that only one which went around the north and west side of the Punch Bowl (the "Red Route"), crossing the Smallbrook Valley was viable. A public consultation on the route met with opposition and two alternatives were suggested both of which drew less support than the proposed route which in 1988 became the preferred route. Subsequent environmental surveys showed that this route would have substantial adverse impacts resulting in the proposal to adapt an earlier scheme by including a tunnel to avoid the most sensitive parts of the route. The scheme entered the government's targeted programme of improvements in 2001.

A public inquiry was held in September 2004 to hear objections and to consider alternatives to the proposal. Among the alternative proposals was one for a surface route following a more westerly line that would avoid building a tunnel (an adaptation of the "Red Route"). Despite being significantly more expensive than building a surface road, a tunnel was preferred after two alternative surface schemes were rejected on environmental grounds. The decision to put part of the road in a tunnel pushed the cost of the project to £371 million, with the underground section costing £155,000 per metre (£142,000 per yard) making that section of road the second most expensive road in the UK per unit distance, after the Limehouse Link tunnel.

=== Geology ===
Geology of the Hindhead Tunnel

The Hindhead tunnel runs through a sequence of fine grained strata of the Lower Greensand Group, which were laid over Weald Clay during the Lower Cretaceous period (70–140 million years ago) on the margins of the subsiding Weald Basin. The Greensand group consists of the Hythe Beds, which overlay a 10 to 20 m (33 to 66 ft) layer of Atherfield Clay. The Hythe beds consist of the Upper Hythe bed, which has a four substrata identified by the letters "A" to "D", and the Lower Hythe bed, which has two strata which are identified by the letters "A" and "B". Originally that whole area was covered by the Bargate Beds, but when the Weald was uplifted, the Bargate Beds were eroded away.

Most of the tunnel passes through the Upper Hythe C and D layers and the Lower Hythe A layer, which are described as "Weak, locally very weak to moderately strong, slightly clayey fine-to-medium sandstone with occasional thin beds of clayey/silty fine sand" and typically has Uniaxial Compressive Strength (UCS) values of 2–5 MPa. The rock is heavily fractured and has mean fracture centres varying from 190 to 815 mm (7.5 to 32.1 inches). The southern end of the tunnel however passes through the "less competent" Upper Hythe A and B layers which are described as "medium-dense thinly bedded and thinly laminated, clean-to-silty and clayey fine and medium sand with subordinate weak-to-strong sandstone, cherty sandstone and chert". Most of the tunnel is above the predicted water table.

=== Access and the old A3 road ===
Route map of the scheme. The route listed as the 'original route' is actually the 1826 route.

Access to the new section of road from the north is via the original A3 with access to the old A3 being provided from the Thursley Junction, completed in 2005, about one kilometre beyond the northern limit of the Hindhead Tunnel works. The new road can be accessed from the south using the original A3 with new access points being provided by new junctions at Hazel Grove.

After the construction was completed, the section of the previous route of A3 from the A287 intersection in Hindhead southwards was renamed the A333 and the 250 m (820 ft) section from the intersection northwards up to the National Trust car park has been retained for access to the car park and other properties. The section from the car park in the London direction, which was created in 1826 to follow the Devil's Punch Bowl contour, has been returned to nature. From the end of that section, the remainder of the old A3 as far as Thursley Junction is used as a local road.

The higher level pre-1826 Old Portsmouth Road route across the Devil's Punch Bowl still exists, and is used a pedestrian and cycle path, and as a bridleway. Besides providing a route across the Devil's Punch Bowl, it also provides access to Gibbet Hill, with its extensive views of Southern England.

=== Tunnel description ===
Chainage	Notes
0 m	Southern limit of works
700 m	End of original A3 dual section (N)
2880 m	Tunnel's southern portal
4600 m	Tunnel's northern portal
5800 m	End of original A3 dual section (S)
6600 m	Northern limit of works

The tunnel was excavated using mechanical diggers rather than a tunnel boring machine (TBM) as the TBM would only have been cheaper if tunnel was longer than 2.5 km (1.6 miles). As a result, the excavated part of the tunnel was horse-shoe in shape rather than circular, and the amount of spoil removed was 20% less than would have been the case had a TBM been used. Each tunnel has an approximate excavated diameter of 11.6 m (38 ft). A 200 mm (8 inches) shotcrete primary lining provided the initial support for the tunnel. At the southern end, where tunneling passed through the Lower Hythe sands, the primary lining was supplemented with 4 m (13 ft) "pins" to provide more support.

Emergency interconnecting cross passages are located at intervals of 100 m (330 ft) to facilitate movement of pedestrians between tunnels in case of emergency.

Ancillary works include a deep cutting to the south of the tunnel with a new junction for Hindhead and Hammer at its southern end. An equestrian and pedestrian bridge, the Miss James Bridge, crosses the cutting between tunnel and junction, and includes heathland planting to link the habitats on either side of the cutting.

== Construction and opening ==
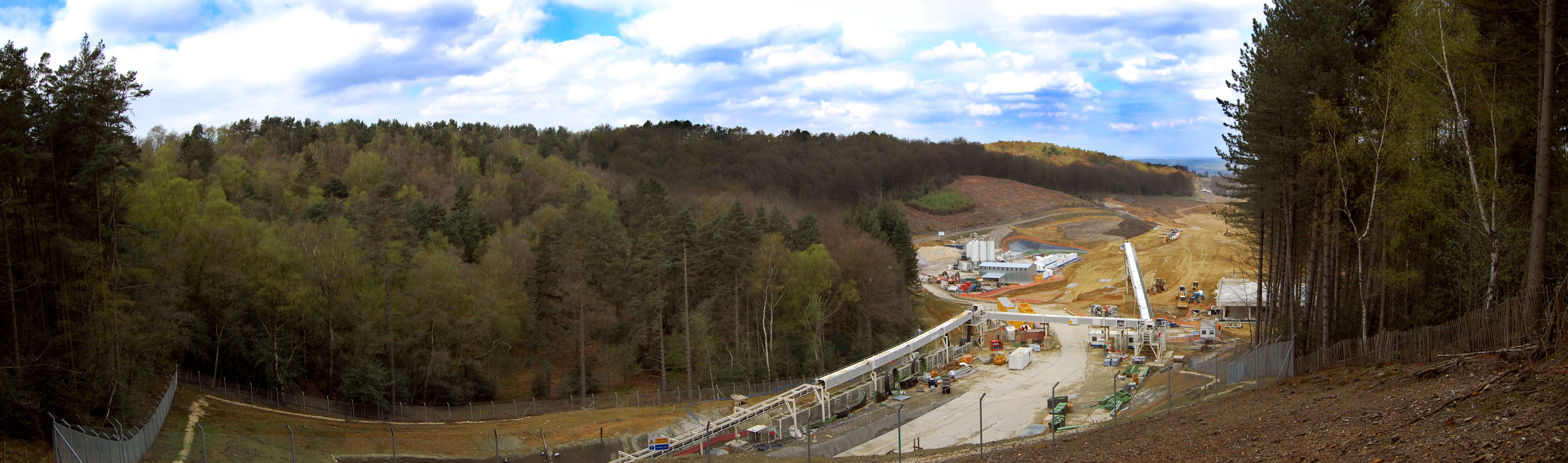
Panorama as seen from Northern viewpoint.

Advance works started in January 2007, and main construction works, including the tunnelling, started in 2008.

Excavation work from the north portal began on 1 February 2008. Two Liebherr diggers were employed, one on each tunnel with work being carried out around the clock, seven days a week. Work from the south portal began on 14 May using a single Liebherr digger to dig both tunnels. Since the south portal was close to housing, work was restricted to a single shift five days a week. The poorer ground at the southern end of the tunnel also slowed progress. The primary linings were sprayed onto the tunnel with the spraying operation following the excavation operation by about two metres when digging through sandstone and about one metre when digging through sand. Breakthrough was achieved on both tunnels on 26 February 2009, 250 m from the south portal. The extraction rate for the southern portion was 1.2 m/day and for the northern portion 3.9 m/day. (Note: The figures assumed that work was carried out for seven days a week on the northern section and five days a week on the southern section of the tunnel.)

Prior to breakthrough, only part of the tunnel – the semicircular cross-section above the bench – was excavated. Excavation of the bench in the southbound tunnel began on 9 July 2008. This work progressed much quicker than the initial excavation work as several faces could be opened up at once. Again, the primary linings were sprayed onto the workings as digging progressed. The excavation and primary linings were completed on 31 March 2009 with a total of 737,000 cubic metres of spoil having been excavated.

The application of the waterproof membrane and the installation of the secondary lining only started once all the excavation and primary lining were complete. The waterproof membrane was sprayed onto the primary lining and the pre-cast invert and side section installed. Spraying of the secondary lining onto the crown of the tunnel was scheduled as part of the finalisation of the excavation works.

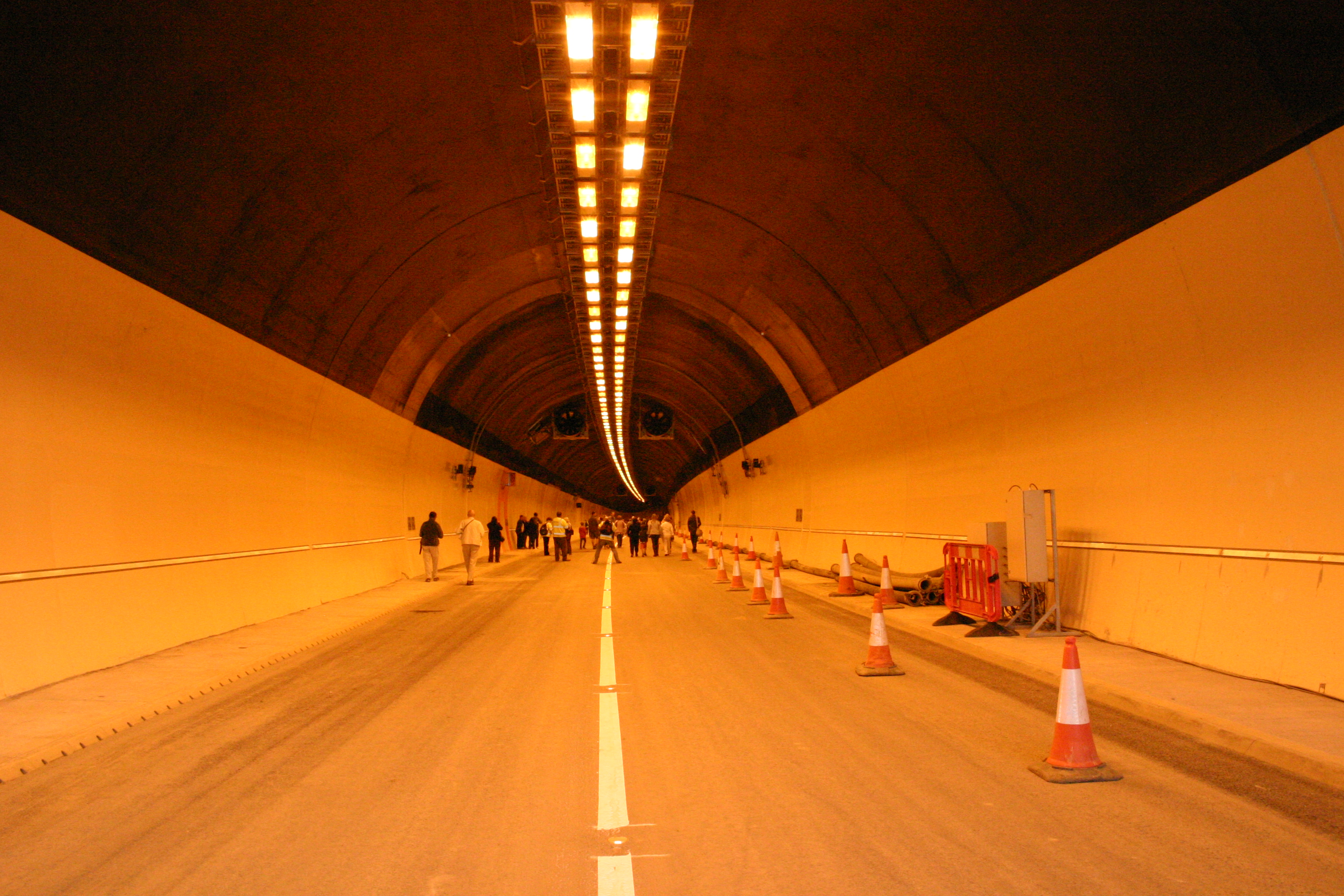
Open Day, 14 May 2011

On Sunday, 14 May 2011, one and a half months before the tunnel was due to open, the contractors staged an open day when 7,000 pedestrians were able to walk the full length of the tunnel while local music groups performed at the north end of the tunnel. These included the Haslemere Town Band, who performed the "Devil's Punch Bowl March" as the first VIPs emerged from the tunnel. This had been composed especially for the occasion by 16-year-old Band member, Eric Foster. The opening ceremony itself, to which the public was not invited for safety reasons, was performed by the Secretary of State for Transport Philip Hammond on 29 July 2011.

== Safety ==
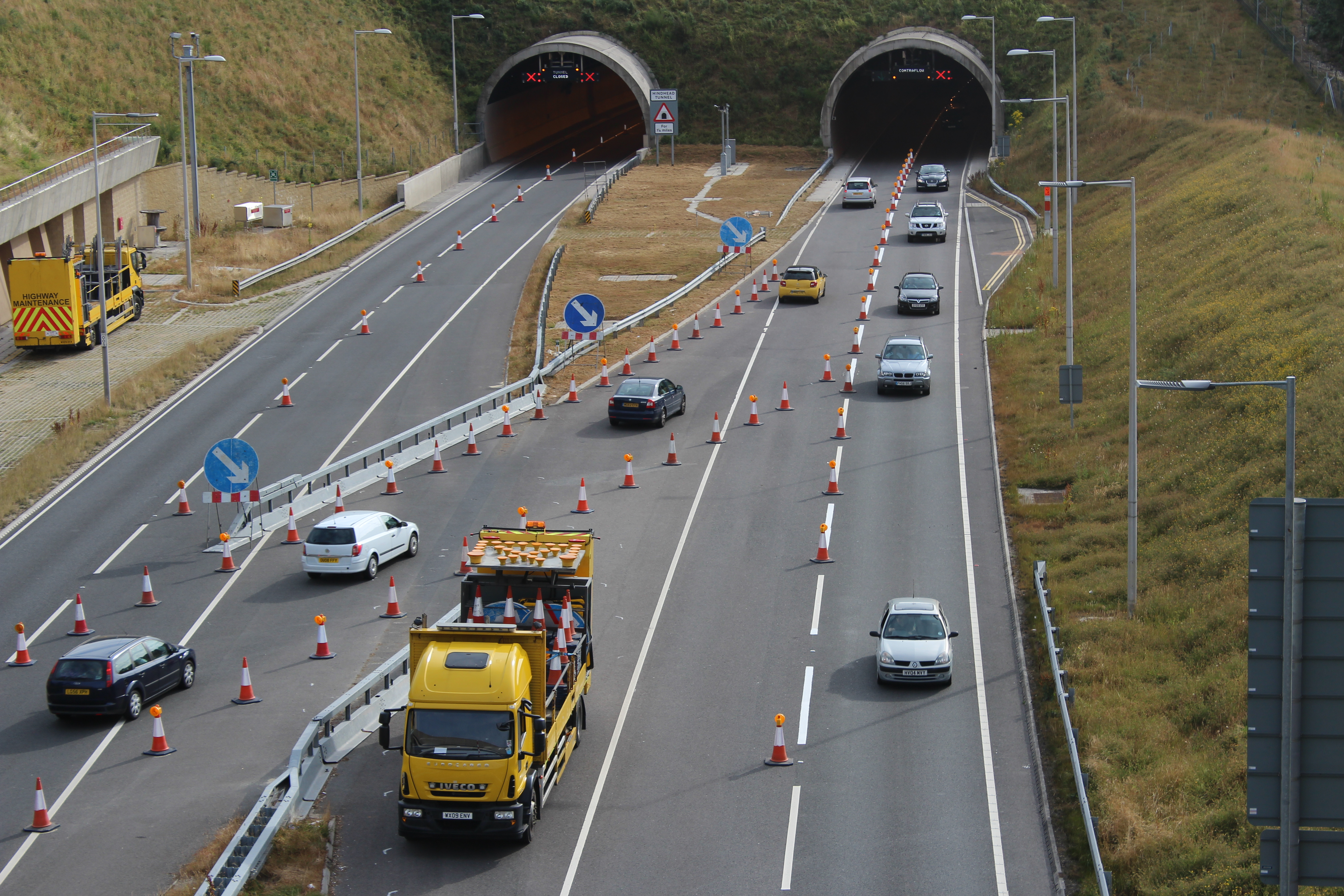
The Hindhead tunnel with the northbound carriageway closed for maintenance

Fatal fires in the Mont Blanc Tunnel and the Gotthard Road Tunnel in 1999 and 2001 respectively, resulting in the temporary closures of these tunnels, led to a re-evaluation of road tunnel safety throughout Europe. An EU directive passed in 2004 laid down the minimum safety requirements for road tunnels within the EU and EFTA that exceed 500 m in length and that are part of the Trans-European Road Network (TEN). Although the Hindhead tunnel is more than 500 m in length, it does not carry part of the TEN road network so legally does not need to comply with the directive.

Cross-connection tunnels have been constructed at 100 metre intervals to allow for emergency evacuation to the other tunnel should there be an incident. Although the EU directive requires laybys at intervals not exceeding 1000 metres for TEN-T tunnels that do not have emergency lanes, the Hindhead tunnel does not have any laybys, but it does have 1.2 m verges on either side of the carriageway. The tunnel has two power supplies, one via the north portal and the other via the south portal, each backing the other up in the event of failure. Ventilation is provided by fans mounted above the traffic, though in normal circumstances they will not be operational.

Electronic equipment includes linear heat detectors, radar coverage and 104 CCTV cameras that can pinpoint incidents, intelligent lighting and LED cat's eyes and comprehensive fire-fighting systems.

The tunnel approaches have cross-over systems that enable the police to direct all traffic through one of the tunnels should the other be closed as a result of an incident or for maintenance. Due to part of the original A3 having been returned to nature, it is not possible to use the old road in an emergency. However the South East of England has a comprehensive road network, and redirection of traffic from the A3 to the M3 would increase the Kingston to Portsmouth journey from 65 miles (105 km) to 89 miles (143 km).

== Environmental considerations ==
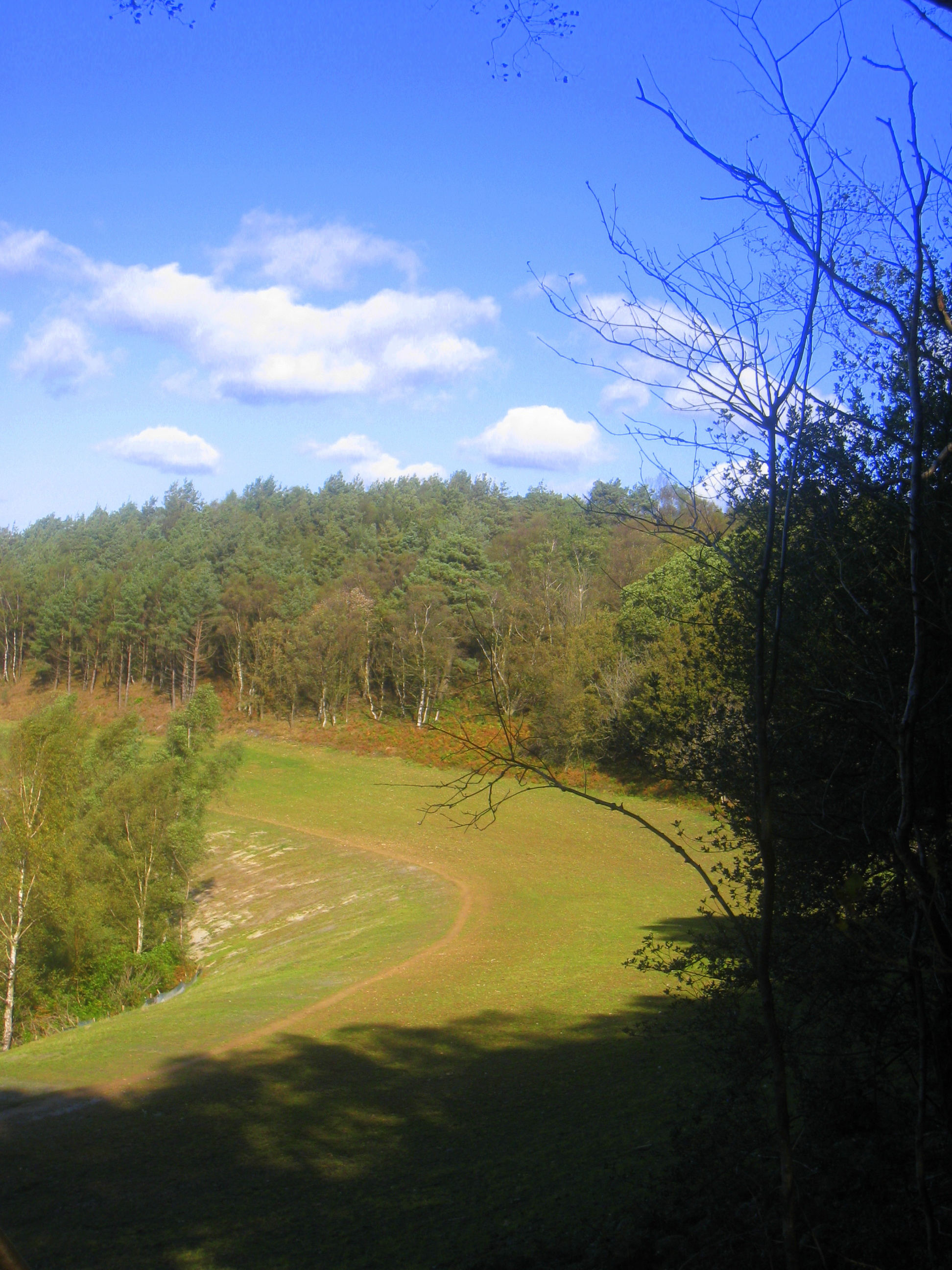
The old A3 is being returned to nature. This view is taken from close to Gibbet Hill, almost directly above the tunnel. October 2012

From the outset a tunnel was built rather than a cutting being dug to avoid spoiling an area of outstanding natural beauty and a Site of Special Scientific Interest, much of which is owned by the National Trust. Before digging started an environmental survey was carried out. Common lizards, adders and slow-worms found at Boundless Valley were relocated to National Trust land at Highcombe Edge while grass snakes were taken to Hurthill Copse.

Tree felling was scheduled to minimise disruption to nesting birds and to other wildlife and in certain instances, animals such as dormice were removed to similar habitats elsewhere. After the works were completed, 200,000 trees were planted on the route of the old road. The restoration of the old road to nature removed a barrier that prevented the migration of ground-nesting birds, such as woodlarks and nightjars from one part of the nature reserve to the other.

Among the artefacts found was an old milestone that was discarded during the rebuilding of the road in 1826. The 1811 Ordnance Survey map was used to identify the original position of the stone where it has since been re-erected. The pre-1826 road is now a pedestrian way to Gibbet Hill. Other artefacts of archaeological interest included two lime kilns found near the Thursley side of the works dating from the 18th or 19th century. It is probable that lime produced by the kilns used limestone or chalk from Petersfield 25 kilometres (16 mi) away and would have been used to counteract the acid nature of the soil.

The main contractors received the Preservation Award at the 2011 Tunnels and Tunnelling Awards and were Overall Winners at the 2012 ICE Thames Valley Engineering Excellence Awards.

== See also ==
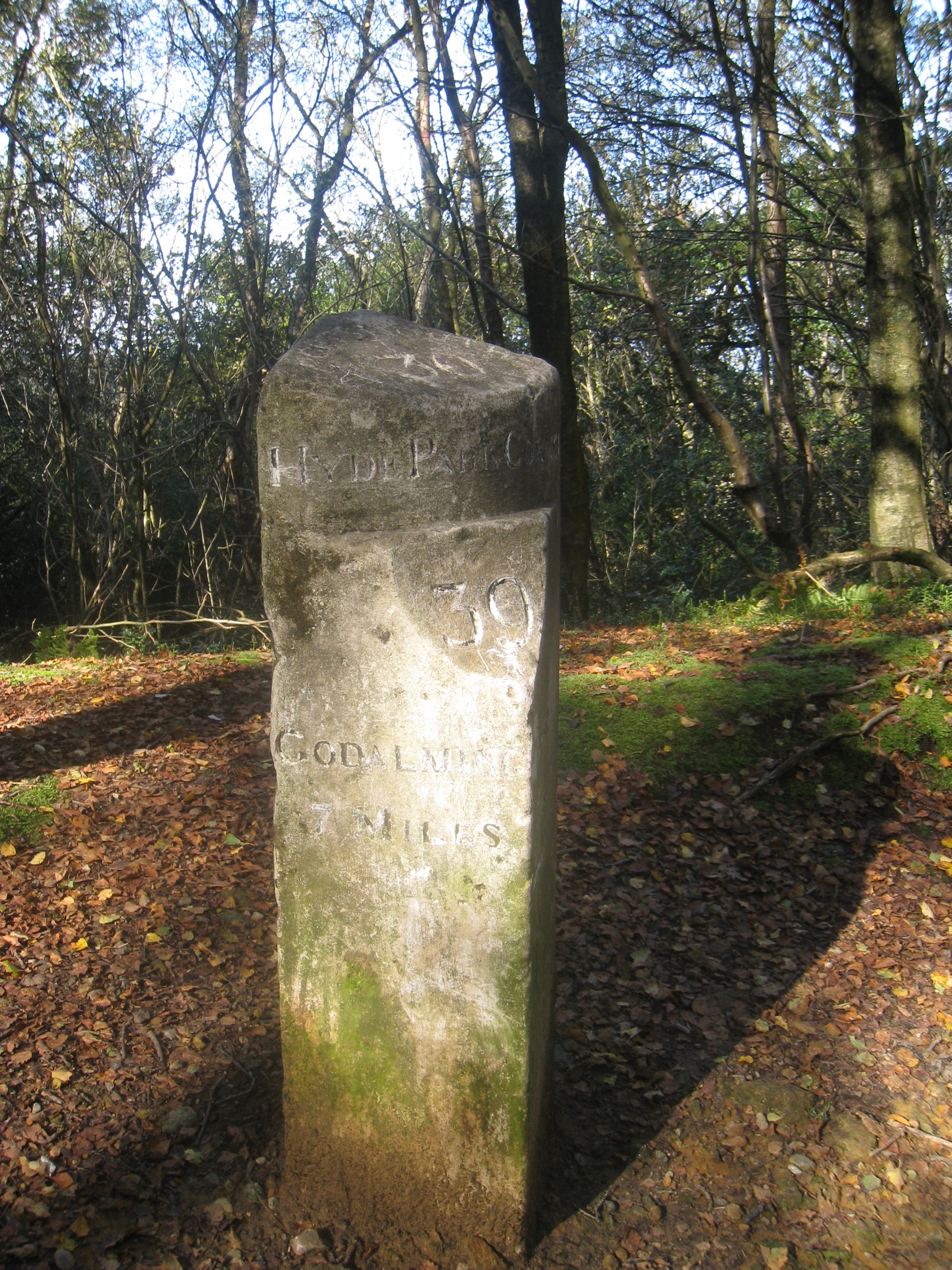
Milestone on the pre-1826 road, close to Gibbet Hill. The inscription reads "Portsmouth 30", "Hyde Park Corner 39", "Godalming 7", "Liphook 11"

- List of tunnels in the United Kingdom
- Devil's Punch Bowl
- Hindhead
- Gibbet Hill, Hindhead
- A3 road
