= A333 road =

Road in England

The A333 is a short road in Surrey, England. It runs between the Hazel Grove junction of the A3 trunk road and the centre of Hindhead both in the large semi-rural civil parish of Haslemere, centred on the town of that name. It was a section of the A3 trunk road until it was re-numbered in 2011, as planned, on the Hindhead Tunnel's construction which bypasses it.

== Route ==
The A333 is a short, straight road close to the north-west edge of civil parish of Haslemere which it runs within. It climbs between the Hazel Grove junction of the A3 trunk road and the centre of Hindhead, the highest village in the county, in high semi-rural parts of the Waverley (district) at the south-west corner of Surrey. The first point is at the western edge of the locality or hamlet named Nutcombe and the north-eastern endpoint is the centre of the touristic village that features the Devil's Punch Bowl. It was formerly a section of the A3 trunk road and was re-numbered in 2011 in the Department for Transport's system as planned on the Hindhead Tunnel's construction.

It runs to/from the Hazel Grove junction of the A3 (Note: 51.107°N 0.744°W) and the centre of Hindhead where it has access to the high point's car parks and a junction with the A287. (Note: 51.114°N 0.733°W)

== Previous allocation ==
This number was previously allocated to a rural route in neighbouring Hampshire, running SSE from Winchester to Cosham via Wickham, which was downgraded in stages between 1983 and 1994 and renamed B2177 and B3335 once the M3 and M27 motorways were finished.

== Notes and references ==
Notes
