= List of schools in Surrey =

This is a list of schools in Surrey, England.

== State-funded schools ==
=== Primary schools ===
- All Saints CE Infant School, Tilford
- Ash Grange Primary School, Ash
- Ashford CE Primary School, Ashford
- Ashford Park Primary School, Ashford
- Ashley CE Primary School, Walton-on-Thames
- Audley Primary School, Caterham
- Auriol Junior School, Stoneleigh
- Badshot Lea Village Infant School, Badshot Lea
- Bagshot Infant School, Bagshot
- Banstead Community Junior School, Banstead
- Banstead Infant School, Banstead
- Barnett Wood Infant School, Ashtead
- Barnsbury Primary School, Woking
- Beacon Hill Community Primary School, Hindhead
- Beauclerc Infant School, Sunbury-on-Thames
- Beaufort Primary School, Woking
- Bell Farm Primary School, Hersham
- Bisley CE Primary School, Bisley
- Bletchingley Village Primary School, Bletchingley
- Boxgrove Primary School, Merrow
- Bramley CE Infant School, Bramley
- Broadmere Primary Academy, Sheerwater
- Brookwood Primary School, Brookwood
- Buckland Primary School, Laleham
- Burhill Primary School, Hersham
- Burpham Primary School, Burpham
- Burstow Primary School, Smallfield
- Busbridge CE Junior School, Busbridge
- Busbridge Infant School, Busbridge
- Byfleet Primary School, Byfleet
- Cardinal Newman RC Primary School, Hersham
- The Chandler CE Junior School, Witley
- Chandlers Field Primary School, West Molesey
- Charlwood Village Primary School, Charlwood
- Chennestone Primary School, Sunbury-on-Thames
- Chilworth CE Infant School, Chilworth
- Clandon CE Primary School, West Clandon
- Clarendon Primary School, Ashford
- Claygate Primary School, Claygate
- Cleves School, Weybridge
- Cobham Free School, Cobham
- Connaught Junior School, Bagshot
- Cordwalles Junior School, Camberley
- Cranleigh CE Primary School, Cranleigh
- Cranmere Primary School, Esher
- Crawley Ridge Infant School, Camberley
- Crawley Ridge Junior School, Camberley
- Cross Farm Infant Academy, Frimley Green
- Cuddington Community Primary School, Worcester Park
- Cuddington Croft Primary School, Cheam
- Danetree Primary School, Ewell
- Darley Dene Primary School, Addlestone
- Dormansland Primary School, Dormansland
- Dovers Green School, Reigate
- Earlswood Infant School, Redhill
- Earlswood Junior School, Redhill
- Eastwick Infant School, Great Bookham
- Eastwick Junior School, Great Bookham
- The Echelford Primary School, Ashford
- Epsom Downs Primary School, Epsom Downs
- Epsom Primary School, Epsom
- Esher Church School, Esher
- Ewell Grove Primary School, Ewell
- Ewhurst CE Infant School, Ewhurst
- Farncombe CE Infant School, Farncombe
- Felbridge Primary School, Felbridge
- Fetcham Village Infant School, Fetcham
- Folly Hill Infant Academy, Farnham
- Frimley CE Junior School, Frimley
- Furzefield Primary School, Merstham
- Godalming Junior School, Godalming
- Godstone Primary School, Godstone
- Goldsworth Primary School, Woking
- The Grange Community Infant School, New Haw
- Grayswood CE Primary School, Grayswood
- Great Bookham School, Great Bookham
- The Greville Primary School, Ashtead
- The Grove Primary Academy, Frimley
- Grovelands Primary School, Walton-on-Thames
- Guildford Grove Primary School, Guildford
- Hale Primary Academy, Upper Hale
- Hamsey Green Primary, Warlingham
- Hatchlands Primary, Redhill
- Hawkedale Primary School, Sunbury-on-Thames
- Heather Ridge Infant School, Camberley
- The Hermitage Infant School, Woking
- The Hermitage Junior School, Woking
- Highfield South Farnham School, Farnham
- Hillcroft Primary School, Caterham
- Hinchley Wood Primary School, Hinchley Wood
- Holland Junior School, Hurst Green
- Holly Lodge Primary Academy, Ash Vale
- Holmesdale Community Infant School, Reigate
- Holy Family RC Primary School, Addlestone
- Holy Trinity CE Junior School, Guildford
- Holy Trinity CE Primary School, Woking
- Horley Infant School, Horley
- Horsell CE Junior School, Horsell
- The Horsell Village School, Horsell
- Hurst Green Infant School, Hurst Green
- Hurst Park Primary Academy, West Molesey
- Hythe Primary School, Staines
- Kenyngton Manor Primary School, Sunbury-on-Thames
- Kingfield Primary School, Woking
- Kingswood Primary School, Lower Kingswood
- The Knaphill Lower School, Knaphill
- Knaphill School, Knaphill
- Lakeside Primary Academy, Frimley
- Laleham CE Primary School, Laleham
- Langshott Primary School, Horley
- Leatherhead Trinity School, Leatherhead
- Lightwater Village Infant School, Lightwater
- Lightwater Village Junior School, Lightwater
- Lime Tree Primary School, Merstham
- Limpsfield CE Infant School, Limpsfield
- Lingfield Primary School, Lingfield
- Littleton CE Infant School, Shepperton
- Long Ditton Infant School, Long Ditton
- Long Ditton St Mary's CE Junior School, Long Ditton
- Lorraine Infant School, Camberley
- Loseley Fields Primary School, Godalming
- Lyne and Longcross CE Primary School, Lyne
- Manby Lodge Infant School, Weybridge
- Manorcroft Primary School, Egham
- Manorfield Primary School, Horley
- Marden Lodge Primary School, Caterham
- The Marist RC Primary School, West Byfleet
- Maybury Primary School, Woking
- The Mead Infant School, Ewell
- Meadhurst Primary School, Ashford
- Meadow Primary School, Stoneleigh
- Meadowcroft Community Primary School, Chertsey
- Meath Green Infant School, Horley
- Meath Green Junior School, Horley
- Merrow CE Infant School, Merrow
- Merrow Junior School, Merrow
- Merstham Primary School, Merstham
- Milford School, Milford
- Moss Lane School, Godalming
- Mytchett Primary Academy, Mytchett
- New Haw Community Junior School, New Haw
- New Monument Primary Academy, Woking
- Newdigate CE Infant School, Newdigate
- North Downs Primary School, Brockham
- Northmead Junior School, Guildford
- Nutfield Church CE Primary School, South Nutfield
- Oakfield Junior School, Fetcham
- Oatlands School, Weybridge
- Ongar Place Primary School, Addlestone
- Onslow Infant School, Onslow Village
- The Orchard Infant School, East Molesey
- Ottershaw Christchurch CE Infant School, Ottershaw
- Ottershaw Christchurch CE Junior School, Ottershaw
- Our Lady of the Rosary RC Primary School, Staines
- Park Mead Primary, Cranleigh
- Peaslake Free School, Peaslake
- Pewley Down Infant School, Guildford
- Pine Ridge Infant School, Camberley
- Pirbright Village Primary School, Pirbright
- Polesden Lacey Infant School, Great Bookham
- Potters Gate CE Primary School, Farnham
- Powell Corderoy Primary School, Dorking
- Prior Heath Infant School, Camberley
- Puttenham CE Infant School, Puttenham
- Pyrcroft Grange Primary School, Chertsey
- Pyrford CE Primary School, Pyrford
- Queen Eleanor's CE School, Guildford
- The Raleigh School, West Horsley
- Ravenscote Junior School, Frimley
- Reigate Parish Church Primary School, Reigate
- Reigate Priory Community Junior School, Reigate
- Riverbridge Primary School, Staines-upon-Thames
- Riverview CE Primary School, West Ewell
- The Royal Alexandra and Albert School, Reigate
- The Royal Kent CE Primary School, Oxshott
- St Alban's RC Primary School, East Molesey
- St Andrew's CE Infant School, Farnham
- St Andrew's CE Primary School, Cobham
- St Anne's RC Primary School, Banstead
- St Anne's RC Primary School, Chertsey
- St Ann's Heath Junior School, Virginia Water
- St Augustine's RC Primary School, Frimley
- St Bartholomew's CE Primary School, Haslemere
- St Charles Borromeo RC Primary School, Weybridge
- St Clement's RC Primary School, Ewell
- St Cuthbert Mayne RC Primary School, Cranleigh
- St Cuthbert's RC Primary School, Englefield Green
- St Dunstan's RC Primary School, Woking
- St Edmund's RC Primary School, Godalming
- St Francis RC Primary School, Caterham
- St Giles' CE Infant School, Ashtead
- St Hugh of Lincoln RC Primary School, Woking
- St Ignatius RC Primary School, Sunbury-on-Thames
- St James CE Primary School, Elstead
- St James CE Primary School, Weybridge
- St John's CE Infant School, Churt
- St John's CE Primary School, Caterham
- St John's CE Primary School, Dorking
- St John's Primary School, Knaphill
- St John's Primary School, Redhill
- St Joseph's RC Primary School, Dorking
- St Joseph's RC Primary School, Epsom
- St Joseph's RC Primary School, Guildford
- St Joseph's RC Primary School, Redhill
- St Jude's CE Infant School, Englefield Green
- St Jude's CE Junior School, Englefield Green
- St Lawrence CE Junior School, East Molesey
- St Lawrence CE Primary School, Chobham
- St Lawrence Primary School, Effingham
- St Mark and All Saints CE Primary, Godalming
- St Martin's CE Infant School, Epsom
- St Martin's CE Junior School, Epsom
- St Martin's CE Primary School, Dorking
- St Mary's CE Infant School, Frensham
- St Mary's CE Infant School, Shackleford
- St Mary's CE Primary School, Byfleet
- St Mary's CE Primary School, Chiddingfold
- St Mary's CE Primary School, Oxted
- St Matthew's CE Infant School, Cobham
- St Matthew's CE Primary School, Redhill
- St Michael RC Primary School, Ashford
- St Michael's CE Infant School, Mickleham
- St Nicholas CE Primary School, Shepperton
- St Nicolas CE Infant School, Guildford
- St Paul's CE Primary School, Farnham
- St Paul's CE Primary School, Addlestone
- St Paul's CE Primary School, Dorking
- St Paul's RC Primary School, Thames Ditton
- St Peter and St Paul CE Primary School, Chaldon
- St Peter's CE Infant School, Tandridge
- St Peter's CE Primary School, Wrecclesham
- St Peter's RC Primary School, Leatherhead
- St Polycarp's RC Primary School, Farnham
- St Stephen's CE Primary School, South Godstone
- St Thomas of Canterbury RC Primary School, Merrow
- Salfords Primary School, Salfords
- Sandcross Primary School, Reigate
- Sandfield Primary School, Guildford
- Sandringham Infant Academy, Frimley
- Saxon Primary School, Shepperton
- Sayes Court School, Addlestone
- Scott Broadwood CE Infant School, Capel
- Send CE Primary School, Send
- Shalford Infant School, Shalford
- Shawfield Primary School, Ash
- Shawley Community Primary Academy, Tattenham Corner
- Shere CE Infant School, Shere
- Shottermill Infant School, Shottermill
- Shottermill Junior School, Shottermill
- South Camberley Primary School, Camberley
- South Farnham School, Farnham
- Southfield Park Primary School, Epsom
- Springfield Primary School, Sunbury-on-Thames
- Stamford Green Primary School, Epsom
- Stanwell Fields CE Primary School, Stanwell
- Stepgates Community School, Chertsey
- Stoughton Infant School, Guildford
- Surrey Hills All Saints Primary School, Westcott
- Sythwood Primary School, Horsell
- Tadworth Primary School, Tadworth
- Tatsfield Primary School, Tatsfield
- Thames Ditton Infant School, Thames Ditton
- Thames Ditton Junior School, Thames Ditton
- Thorpe CE Primary School, Thorpe
- Thorpe Lea Primary School, Thorpe Lea
- Tillingbourne Junior School, Chilworth
- Town Farm Primary School, Stanwell
- Trinity Oaks CE Primary School, Horley
- Trumps Green Infant School, Virginia Water
- The Vale Primary School, Epsom
- Valley End CE Infant School, Valley End
- Wallace Fields Infant School, Ewell
- Wallace Fields Junior School, Ewell
- Walsh CE Junior School, Ash
- Walsh Memorial CE Infant School, Ash
- Walton Oak Primary School, Walton-on-Thames
- Walton-on-the-Hill Primary School, Walton-on-the-Hill
- Warlingham Village Primary School, Warlingham
- Warren Mead Infant School, Banstead
- Warren Mead Junior School, Nork
- Waverley Abbey CE Junior School, Tilford
- The Weald CE Primary School, Beare Green
- West Ashtead Primary School, Ashtead
- West Byfleet Infant School, West Byfleet
- West Byfleet Junior School, West Byfleet
- West Ewell Primary School, West Ewell
- Westfield Primary School, Westfield
- Westvale Park Primary Academy, Horley
- Weyfield Academy, Guildford
- Whyteleafe Primary School, Whyteleafe
- William Cobbett Primary School, Farnham
- Windlesham Village Infant School, Windlesham
- Witley CE Infant School, Witley
- Wonersh and Shamley Green CE Primary School, Shamley Green
- Wood Street Infant School, Guildford
- Woodlea Primary School, Woldingham
- Woodmansterne Primary School, Woodmansterne
- Worplesdon Primary School, Worplesdon
- Wray Common Primary School, Reigate
- Wyke Primary School, Normandy
- Yattendon School, Horley

=== Secondary schools ===
- All Hallows Catholic School, Weybourne
- Ash Manor School, Ash
- The Ashcombe School, Dorking
- The Beacon School, Banstead
- Bishop David Brown School, Woking
- The Bishop Wand Church of England School, Sunbury-on-Thames
- Blenheim High School, Epsom
- Broadwater School, Farncombe
- Carrington School, Redhill
- Chertsey High School, Addlestone
- Christ's College, Guildford
- Cobham Free School, Cobham
- Collingwood College, Camberley
- de Stafford School, Caterham
- Epsom and Ewell High School, Ewell
- Esher Church of England High School, Esher
- Farnham Heath End School, Farnham
- Fullbrook School, New Haw
- George Abbot School, Guildford
- Glebelands School, Cranleigh
- Glyn School, Ewell
- Gordon's School, Woking
- Guildford County School, Guildford
- Heathside School, Weybridge
- Heathside Walton-on-Thames, Walton-on-Thames
- Hinchley Wood School, Hinchley Wood
- Hoe Valley School, Woking
- Howard of Effingham School, Effingham
- Jubilee High School, Addlestone
- King's College, Guildford
- Kings International College, Camberley
- The Magna Carta School, Staines-upon-Thames
- The Matthew Arnold School, Staines-upon-Thames
- Merstham Park School, Redhill
- Oakwood School, Horley
- Oxted School, Oxted
- The Priory School, Dorking
- Reigate School, Reigate
- Rodborough School, Milford
- Rosebery School for Girls, Epsom
- The Royal Alexandra and Albert School, Reigate
- St Andrew's Catholic School, Leatherhead
- St Bede's School, Redhill
- St John the Baptist School, Woking
- St Paul's Catholic College, Sunbury-on-Thames
- St Peter's Catholic School, Guildford
- Salesian School, Chertsey
- Sunbury Manor School, Sunbury-on-Thames
- Thamesmead School, Shepperton
- Therfield School, Leatherhead
- Thomas Knyvett College, Ashford
- Three Rivers Academy, Walton-on-Thames
- Tomlinscote School, Camberley
- Warlingham School, Warlingham
- Weydon School, Farnham
- The Winston Churchill School, Woking
- Woking High School, Woking
- Woolmer Hill School, Haslemere

=== Special and alternative schools ===
- The Abbey School, Farnham
- Bramley Oak Academy, Bramley
- Brooklands School, Reigate
- Carwarden House Community School, Camberley
- Clifton Hill School, Caterham
- Fordway Centre, Ashford
- Fox Grove School, West Molesey
- Freemantles School, Mayford
- Gosden House School, Bramley
- Grafham Grange School, Grafham
- The Hope Service, Guildford
- Limpsfield Grange School, Oxted
- Linden Bridge School, Worcester Park
- Manor Mead School, Shepperton
- North East Surrey Secondary Short Stay School, Hersham
- North West Surrey Short Stay School, Woking
- The Park School, Woking
- Philip Southcote School, Addlestone
- Pond Meadow School, Guildford
- Portesbery School, Deepcut
- Reigate Valley College, Sidlow
- The Ridgeway School, Farnham
- St Dominic's School, Hambledon
- St Peter's Centre, Englefield Green
- Sunnydown School, Caterham
- The Surrey Teaching Centre, Tadworth
- Unified Academy, Dorking
- Walton Leigh School, Hersham
- West Hill School, Leatherhead
- Wey Valley College, Guildford
- Wishmore Cross Academy, Woking
- Woodfield School, Merstham
- Woodlands School, Leatherhead

=== Sixth form colleges ===
- Brooklands College
- East Surrey College
- Esher College
- Farnham College
- Godalming College
- Guildford College
- North East Surrey College of Technology
- Reigate College
- Strode's College
- Woking College
- Surrey Maths School

== Independent schools ==
=== Primary and preparatory schools ===
- Aberdour School, Burgh Heath
- Aldro School, Shackleford
- Amesbury School, Hindhead
- Banstead Preparatory School, Banstead
- Barfield School, Runfold
- Barrow Hills School, Witley
- Bishopsgate School, Englefield Green
- Chinthurst School, Tadworth
- Cobham Montessori School, Cobham
- Copthorne Preparatory School, Copthorne
- Coworth-Flexlands School, Valley End
- Danes Hill School, Oxshott
- The Danesfield Manor School, Walton-on-Thames
- Edgeborough School, Farnham
- Essendene Lodge School, Caterham
- Feltonfleet School, Cobham
- Glenesk School, East Horsley
- Greenfield School, Woking
- Hall Grove School, Bagshot
- Halstead St Andrew's School, Horsell/Woking
- The Hawthorns School, Bletchingley
- Hazelwood School, Limpsfield
- Hoe Bridge School, Old Woking
- Little Downsend Epsom, Epsom
- Little Downsend Leatherhead, Leatherhead
- Longacre School, Shamley Green (Closed 2025)
- Lyndhurst School, Camberley
- Micklefield School, Reigate
- Milbourne Lodge School, Esher
- Oakhyrst Grange School, Caterham
- Parkside School, Stoke D'abernon
- Redehall Preparatory School, Smallfield
- Reigate St Mary's School, Reigate
- Ripley Court School, Ripley
- Rowan Preparatory School, Claygate
- Rydes Hill Preparatory School, Guildford
- St Christopher's School, Epsom
- St Hilary's School, Godalming
- St Ives School, Haslemere
- St John's Beaumont School, Englefield Green
- Shrewsbury House Pre Preparatory School, Esher
- Staines Preparatory School, Staines-upon-Thames
- Warlingham Park School, Warlingham
- Weston Green Preparatory School, Thames Ditton
- Westward School, Walton-on-Thames

=== Senior and all-through schools ===
- ACS International Schools, Cobham
- ACS International Schools, Egham
- Belmont School, Holmbury St Mary
- Box Hill School, Mickleham
- Caterham School, Caterham
- Charterhouse School, Godalming
- City of London Freemen's School, Ashtead
- Claremont Fan Court School, Esher
- Cranleigh School, Cranleigh
- Cranmore School, West Horsley
- Downsend School, Leatherhead
- Duke of Kent School, Ewhurst
- Dunottar School, Reigate
- Epsom College, Epsom
- Ewell Castle School, Ewell
- Frensham Heights School, Frensham
- Guildford High School, Guildford
- Halliford School, Shepperton
- Hurtwood House, Holmbury St Mary
- King Edward's School, Witley
- Kingswood House School, Epsom
- Lingfield College, Lingfield
- Manor House School, Little Bookham
- Notre Dame School, Cobham
- OneSchool Global UK, Hindhead
- Prior's Field School, Godalming
- Reed's School, Cobham
- Reigate Grammar School, Reigate
- Royal Grammar School, Guildford
- The Royal School, Haslemere
- St Catherine's School, Bramley
- St Edmund's School, Hindhead
- St George's College, Weybridge
- St James Independent Schools, Ashford
- St John's School, Leatherhead
- St Teresa's School, Effingham
- Sir William Perkins's School, Chertsey
- TASIS England, Thorpe
- Tormead School, Guildford
- Woldingham School, Woldingham
- Yehudi Menuhin School, Stoke d'Abernon

=== Special and alternative schools ===
- Ashley Park School, Walton-on-Thames
- Aurora Poppyfield School, Effingham
- Aurora Redehall School, Smallfield
- The Beech House School, West Molesey
- Burstow Park School, Burstow
- Castle Garden School, Guildford
- The Children's Trust School, Tadworth
- Eagle House School, Walton-on-the-Hill
- Elysian Farm, Shamley Green
- Egham Park School, Egham
- Fernways School, Windlesham
- Grafham Grange School, Grafham
- Jigsaw School, Cranleigh
- Knowl Hill School, Pirbright
- Maypole School, Sunbury-on-Thames
- Meath School, Ottershaw
- Merrywood House Independent Special School, Tadworth
- Moon Hall School, Leigh
- Moor House School & College, Hurst Green
- More House School, Frensham
- Papillon House, Tadworth
- Pathways Education, Farnham
- St Joseph's Specialist School, Cranleigh
- St Piers School, Lingfield
- Undershaw, Hindhead
- Unsted Park School, Godalming
- Wemms Education Centre, Long Ditton
