= Surrey College =

Surrey College or Surry College can refer to:

- Surrey Community College, in Surrey, British Columbia
- Surry Community College, Dobson, North Carolina, USA
- East Surrey College, Redhill, London, England
- North East Surrey College of Technology, Epsom and Ewell, Surrey, England
- University of Surrey, Guildford, Surrey, England

== See also ==
- List of schools in Surrey
