= Woolmer (disambiguation) =

Woolmer is a locality in East Hampshire, in South East England, the main feature of which is Woolmer Forest.

The name Woolmer (or Woolmers) may also refer to:

== Places ==
=== Australia ===
- Woolmer, Queensland, a locality in the Toowoomba Region
- Woolmers Estate, a farming estate located in Longford, Tasmania

=== United Kingdom ===
- Woolmer Green, a small village and civil parish in Hertfordshire, England
- Woolmer Hill, an area of high ground in the Borough of Waverley, in Surrey, England
- Woolmers Park, a Grade II* listed building in Hertfordshire, England

== Institutions ==
- Woolmer Hill School, the main secondary school in the area of Haslemere, Surrey

== People ==
- Alfred Woolmer (1805–1892), English painter
- Bob Woolmer (1948–2007), English cricketer
- Caroline Woolmer Leakey (1827–1881), English writer who lived five years in Van Diemen's Land (now Tasmania)
- Clarence Woolmer (1910–1999), English cricketer
- Kenneth Woolmer, Baron Woolmer of Leeds (born 1940), British university lecturer and politician
- Laurence Woolmer (1906–1977), Bishop of Lahore, 1949-68
- Luke Woolmer (born 1965), Australian politician
- Ronald Woolmer, to whom the Woolmer Lecture is dedicated
- Tony Woolmer (born 1946), English footballer

== See also ==
- Wooler
