= Chertsey High School =

Secondary free school in Surrey, England

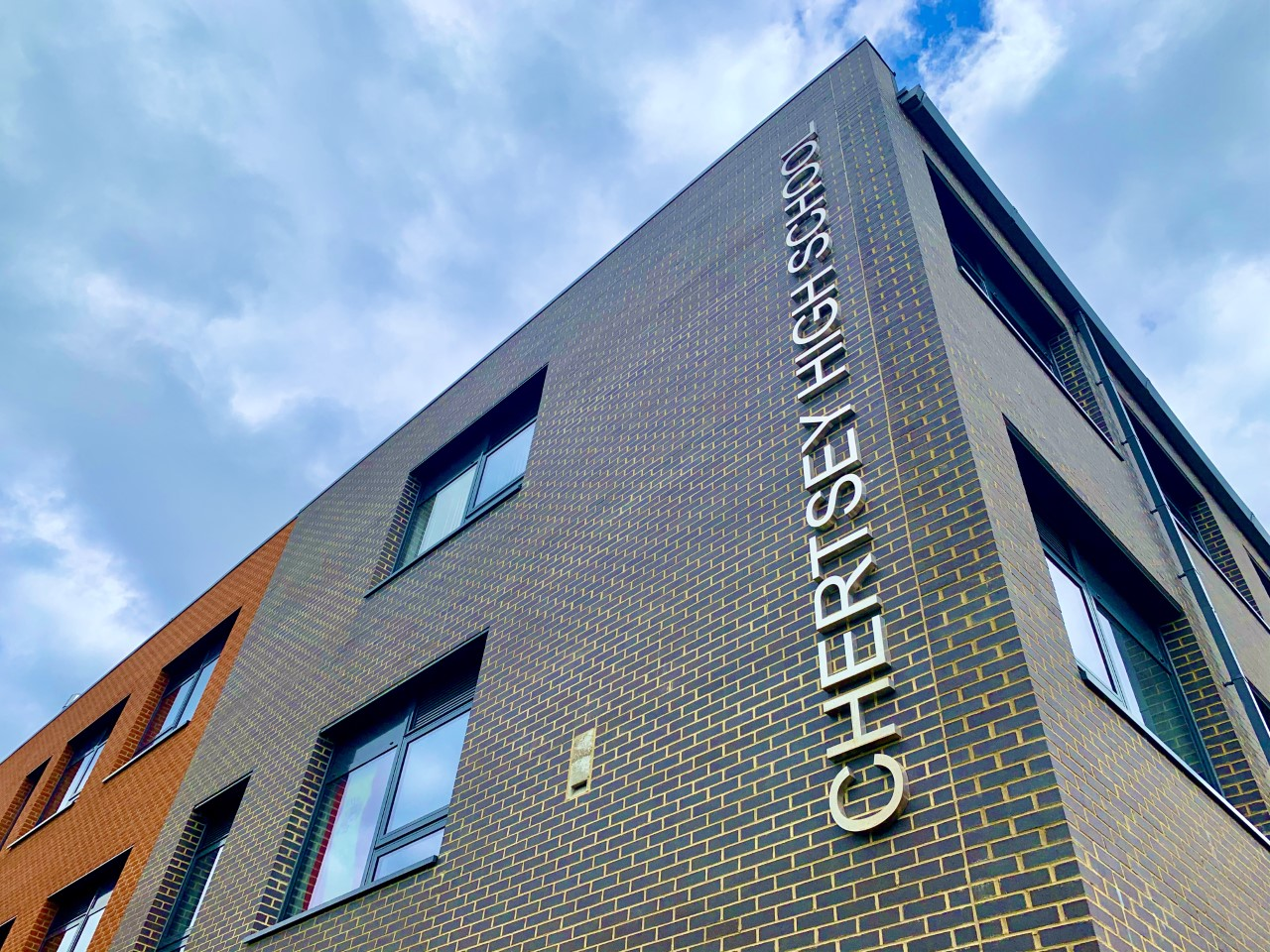

Location
- Chertsey Road; Addlestone, Surrey, KT15 2EP; England; 51.382821°N 0.493717°W

Information
- Type: Secondary free school
- Local authority: Surrey County Council
- Department for Education URN: 144741 Tables
- Ofsted: Reports
- Chairman of Governors: Kathryn Hitchings
- Headteacher: Mary Gould
- Staff: 50 (32 teaching, 18 support) as of May 2023
- Gender: Mixed
- Age: 11 to 16
- Enrolment: 900 as of August 2025
- Colour: Purple
- Current admissions policy: Comprehensive
- Website: www.chertseyhighschool.co.uk

Chertsey High School is a co-educational secondary free school located on Chertsey Road in Addlestone, Surrey, England. The school was opened on 6 September 2017, and educates pupils from the age of 11 to 16 (Years 7 to 11).

== History ==
The school is located on the former site of the Meads County Secondary School which was closed in 1985 when it merged with St Paul's County Secondary School to form the Abbeylands School (renamed Jubilee High School in 2002). 21 years before its closure, Meads County Secondary had merged with Stepgates County Secondary School.

The former Meads school buildings then became the Runnymede Centre which housed the offices of county council workers, who were temporarily vacated from the building when it was used as a relief centre during the Winter floods of 2013-2014.

In 2015 the establishment of a new secondary school was approved by the Department for Education, and the site reverted to use as a secondary school after 32 years upon the opening of Chertsey High in 2017. The school was opened to students by Mayor of Runnymede Iftikhar Chaudhri on 6 September 2017, with Zelia Munnik as the first Headteacher until 2023, after which Mary Gould took over. The school has been governed by the Bourne Education Trust since its opening.

The old buildings were demolished and replaced with the current facilities in September 2019.

== Academic performance ==
The school's first Ofsted inspection in February 2022 gave the school an overall rating of "Good" on the four-point scale (Outstanding/Good/Satisfactory/Inadequate). It received a rating of "Good" in its quality of education, behaviour and attitude, and leadership and management. It received an "Outstanding" rating for personal development.

== See also ==
- List of schools in Surrey
- Chertsey
