= Woolmer Hill =

Coordinates: 51.09°N 00.75°W

- Location within Surrey
- OS grid reference: SU877331
- Shire county: Surrey
- Region: South East
- Country: England
- Sovereign state: United Kingdom
- Post town: HASLEMERE
- Police: Surrey
- Fire: Surrey
- Ambulance: South East Coast

Woolmer Hill is an area of high ground in the south-west corner of Surrey, England in the Borough of Waverley abutting Hampshire to the west and West Sussex to the south. It is in the circa 1900-founded parish of Shottermill. In the north, it is covered by woodland, and a higher land to the south has its residential neighbourhood on streets Hatchett's Drive and Lower Hanger. The hill reaches 185.5 metres (609 ft) above sea level, its foot being about 60 metres (200 ft) below. The area is bounded to the west by Sandy Lane and to the east by Woolmer Hill Road. To the east is Woolmer Hill School and to its south semi-rural houses and St Mary's Abbey. Most of its buildings are 20th century, and the locality or neighbourhood owes this expansion to the enlargement of the A3 trunk road nearby and the growth of Haslemere, which is a semi-major stop on the Portsmouth Direct Line (railway).

== See also ==
- Woolmer (disambiguation)
