= Weydon School =

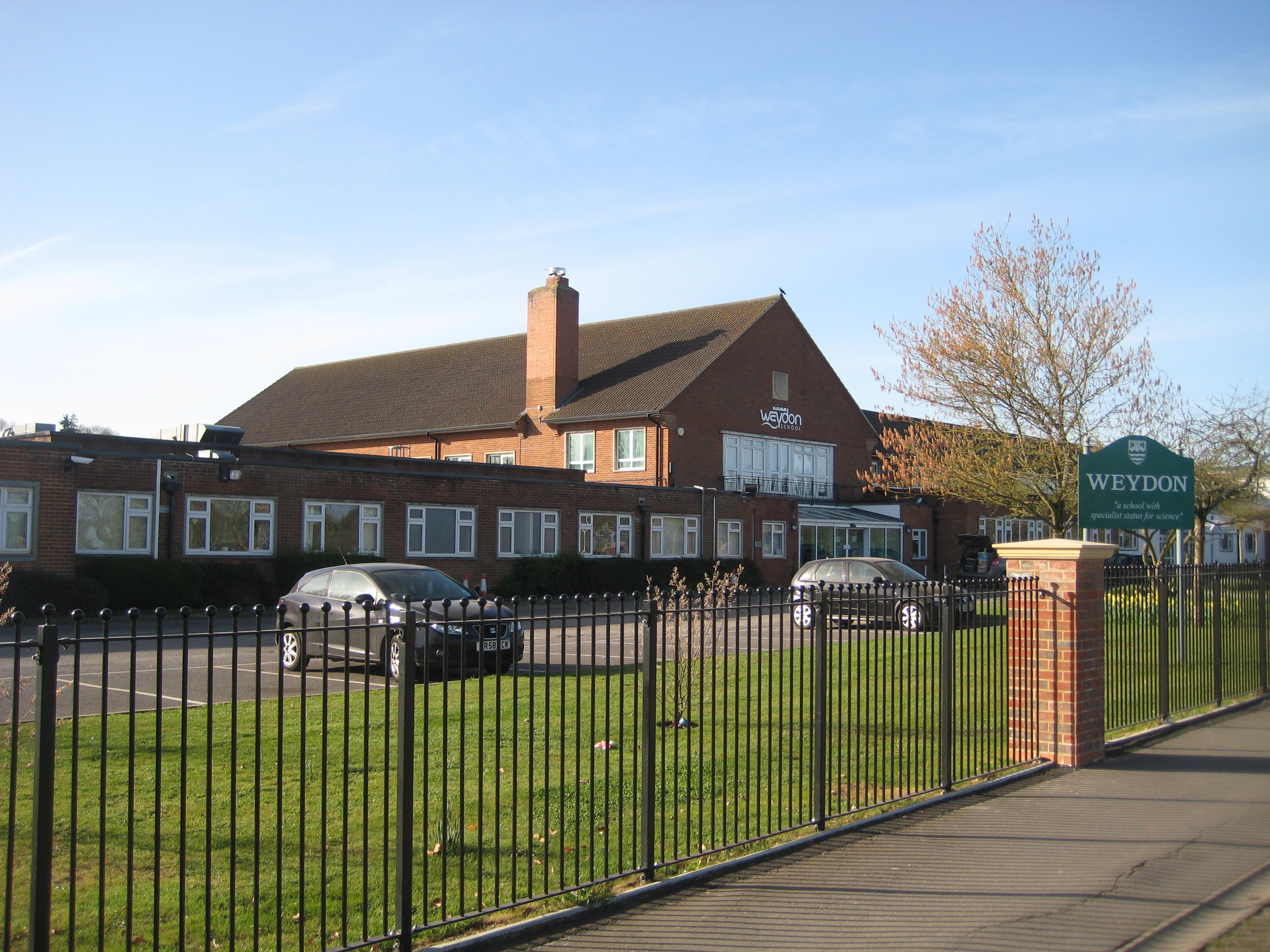

Location
- Weydon Lane; Farnham, Surrey, GU9 8UG; England; 51°12′08″N 0°48′52″W

Information
- Type: Academy
- Motto: Believe. Belong. Care.
- Established: 16 September 1957
- Local authority: Surrey
- Trust: Weydon Multi Academy Trust
- Specialist: Science College
- Department for Education URN: 136531 Tables
- Ofsted: Reports
- Principal: Ross Allen
- Gender: Mixed
- Age: 11 to 16
- Enrolment: 1,490
- Colours: Green, White and Purple
- Website: weydonschool.com

Weydon School is a secondary academy school located in Weydon Lane, Farnham, Surrey, England. It is the lead school of the Weydon Multi Academy Trust.

== History ==
Opened as Weydon County Secondary School on 16 September 1957. The first headmaster (1957 to 1968) was Mr A H Surman, who was succeeded by Mr Chambers. By that time there were some 500 students in 5 academic years, years 1 to 4 divided into four streams based on perceived ability/achievement, year 5 divided into 2 streams, students from the lower 2 streams having left at age 15.

Weydon School was granted Specialist Science Status in 2003.

== Site ==
Currently the school caters for children from 11 to 16. Its main feeder schools are Highfield South Farnham, Potters Gate CE Primary School, Rowledge CE Primary School, St Peter's School, South Farnham School and Waverley Abbey Junior School. The majority of the students go on from Weydon to The Sixth Form College, Farnborough, Farnham College, Alton College or Godalming College.

Weydon School underwent expansion in 2008 as part of the Faraday project funded by the Government and aimed to increase attainment levels in science. Weydon was selected as one of only a few schools throughout the country to receive this grant. The money was spent on a new high tech science computer room, 'rainforest room' and state of the art labs were built over a summer.

A further expansion project was announced in 2013, with work starting in 2014. It expanded the cafeteria (previously known as Breakpoint Cafe), built new changing rooms and rebuilt the arts and humanities departments. The new 'Medici' art block was opened on 4 March 2016 containing a state-of-the-art theatre, art rooms and additional facilities. Multiple performances have been displayed within the Medici theatre alongside art displays throughout the year. The 'Globe' block was opened in 2017, it predominantly houses History, English and Geography, but also contains classrooms dedicated to Film and Media Studies as well as Religious Studies. The building contains the LRC (Learning Resource Centre), consisting of an extensive library and computer suite.

== Inspection ==
The Ofsted inspection of the school in 2009 was Outstanding after receiving a satisfactory rating in 2006.

A 2023 inspection resulted in a downgrading of rating to Good with Outstanding in quality of education and personal development.

== Weydon Multi Academy Trust ==
The Weydon Multi Academy Trust (WMAT) is made up of six local schools: Weydon School in Farnham, Farnham Heath End School in Farnham, The Ridgeway Community School in Farnham, Woolmer Hill School in Haslemere, The Abbey School in Farnham, The Park School In Woking, and Rodborough School in Milford, Surrey. It aims to "share good practice[and] raise standards and performance across all of the schools". It is headed by John Winter (previous head teacher of Weydon School) acting as the CEO of the Trust.

== i2i Teaching Partnership ==
The i2i Teaching Partnership is teacher college based in Weydon School. The partnership has schools in Surrey, Hampshire, Berkshire and Middlesex.

== GCSE ==
In the 2020 Sunday Times Parent Power Schools Guide, Weydon School was ranked first (having come in fourth the previous year) with 45.1% of students achieving GCSE A*/A/9/8/7

In the 2023 Sunday Times Parent Power Schools Guide, Weydon School was ranked sixth best in the country, for schools with no or new sixth forms, with 46.8% of students achieving GCSE A*/A/9/8/7

== Notable alumni ==
- Henry Bond, artist and photographer
- Martin Millett, classical archaeologist and academic
- Graham Thorpe, England cricket batsman
- Rachel Morris, para cyclist and rower
- Graham Ross, conductor and composer
