= Catching a Killer =

British true crime television series

- Genre: True crime
- Country of origin: United Kingdom
- Original language: English
- No. of episodes: 6

Production
- Production locations: Thames Valley, England
- Running time: 62-90 minutes
- Production company: True Vision

Original release
- Network: Channel 4
- Release: 19 July 2017 – present

Catching a Killer is a British true crime documentary television series that has aired on Channel 4 since 2017. Each episode documents detectives with the Thames Valley Police as they investigate a murder. Six episodes have aired as of July 2024. The series is produced by True Vision productions.

== Episodes ==
No.	Title	Directed by	Original release date	Viewers (millions)	Runtime
1	"The Search for Natalie Hemming"	Anna Hall	1 June 2017	N/A	82 min
Natalie Hemming, a mother of three, vanishes after she breaks up with her abusive and controlling partner.
2	"The Wind in the Willows Murder"	Jezza Neumann	19 July 2017	N/A	90 min
Antiquarian Adrian Greenwood was stabbed more than 30 times and a rare first edition of The Wind in the Willows, worth £50,000, was missing.
3	"A Bullet Through the Window"	Erica Gornall	7 December 2017	N/A	62 min
Suhaib Mohammed, 18, is murdered when someone shot him through an open window in a quiet neighbourhood.
4	"A Knock at the Door"	Jennifer Shaw	14 May 2018	N/A	63 min
Hang Yin Leung, 64, an emigrant from Hong Kong, dies 11 days after being beaten by six men who robbed her Milton Keynes home.
5	"A Diary From The Grave"	Jezza Neumann & Jess Stevenson	13 January 2020	N/A	83 min
Two years after his death, the body of author and retired teacher Peter Farquhar is exhumed after suspicions are raised about his former partner, Ben Field. Police use Farquhar's diary to search for clues in his relationship.
6	"A Stab in the Dark"	Becky Ford	31 July 2024	N/A	68 min
On the night of Sunday 2nd October 2022, 21 year old Kyron Lee is knocked off his bike and stabbed to death by a group of men in a stolen car near Cippenham. A police investigation follows to catch the perpetrators of the horrific attack.
7	"Buried Truths"	Jezza Neumann & Erica Gornall	6 January 2026	N/A	56 min
Lured into a bar by his love rival, Cumali Turhan has been reported missing. Essex Police suspect foul play. When a witness sees Turhan's body thrown out with the rubbish, a murder enquiry begins.
