= Glebelands School =

Location
- Parsonage Road; Cranleigh, Surrey, GU6 7AN; England
- Coordinates: 51.14369°N 0.48797°W

Information
- Type: Community school
- Motto: Respect and Achieve
- Established: c. 1956
- Local authority: Surrey County Council
- Department for Education URN: 125259 Tables
- Ofsted: Reports
- Chair of Governors: Nigel Sanctuary
- Head of School: Russell Mitchell
- Gender: Coeducational
- Age: 11 to 16
- Website: www.glebelands.surrey.sch.uk

Glebelands School is a county-funded and charity-supported secondary school in Cranleigh, Surrey, England. It is co-educational and takes students aged 11–16; it does not have a sixth form.

== History ==
The Crane, as considered by historians a possible origin of Cranleigh (which has or had crane reserves at Baynards and Vachery) was chosen in 1956 as the emblem. The land of the school was part of Parsonage Farm, therefore glebeland. The emblem was a crane, alert and vigilant, holding a pebble to splash itself awake should its alertness falter, however the pebble and 'vigilance' initially chosen as the motto, have evolved under Mrs Knight and the Board of Governors at the time (2004-2009) to a more self-analytical motto, reflecting the greater achievement of society at large, and appreciating one's own ideas and successes as much as those as others.

The school from the early 20th century to 1956 was the Secondary Modern Extension of the St. Nicholas (Upper) School, and before World War II part of this stage of education was, for the last two years of school, optional. Elmbridge Boarding School in Cranleigh operated until it was converted to a retirement village and provided limited classes for the relatively advanced pupils who could afford its fees as did public schools which drew the most able and wealthy. On 4 September 1956 the school opened as the County Comprehensive Secondary (Modern) Mixed School, Cranleigh. In 1958, the addition of children from Bramley School meant that, with 317 pupils, the existing rooms in the original village school and HORSA blocks were inadequate and extra rooms were found in places such as the Village Hall. Two years before much groundwork was led in a communal and county-led effort for new buildings, described in readiness by the first headteacher as:

"Hedges...levelled, ditches piped and ground ploughed for the Playing Fields...It has been possible to preserve a few of the larger trees."

The school began largely secular but saw local clerics speak at assembly every Friday.

The 1950s was a period of marked social change: Dunsfold, Grafham, Alfold, Ellen's Green and Ewhurst all had schools that contributed pupils, but some would go into more established schools and many children would commence work after typically three years of the present senior school system. The badge was the heraldic ‘crane in its vigilance’, holding a rock which would awaken it by splashing into the water, should it fail in attentiveness. Boys were keener on wearing caps than girls were their berets, or later boaters, but by 1960 they were all almost extinct. The new building opened in 1959 served by good grounds and piped water and with it the current title, Glebelands School.

== Assessment ==
The school was judged Good in 2013, under a reformed and more critical Ofsted inspection regime, the second highest category, having in the last inspection, four years earlier, been overall also good. All of the four grouped criteria were good. The report led with "Most teaching is good or better and, as a result, the majority of students make good progress from their starting points. A relatively high proportion of teaching is outstanding."

Depending on which of the main three subjects is analysed, results overall in 2012 were from the 3rd to the 4th quintile (five equal groups) nationally. The 2013 results had "improved significantly" by 2013 according to the Ofsted report, results which have yet to be put into national groups for comparison between similar and all schools.

== House System ==
The school has a well established house system, based on historical figures. These include Franklin, Attenborough, Seacole and Angelou.

== See also ==
- List of schools in Surrey
