= Adrian Greenwood =

British historian (1973–2016)

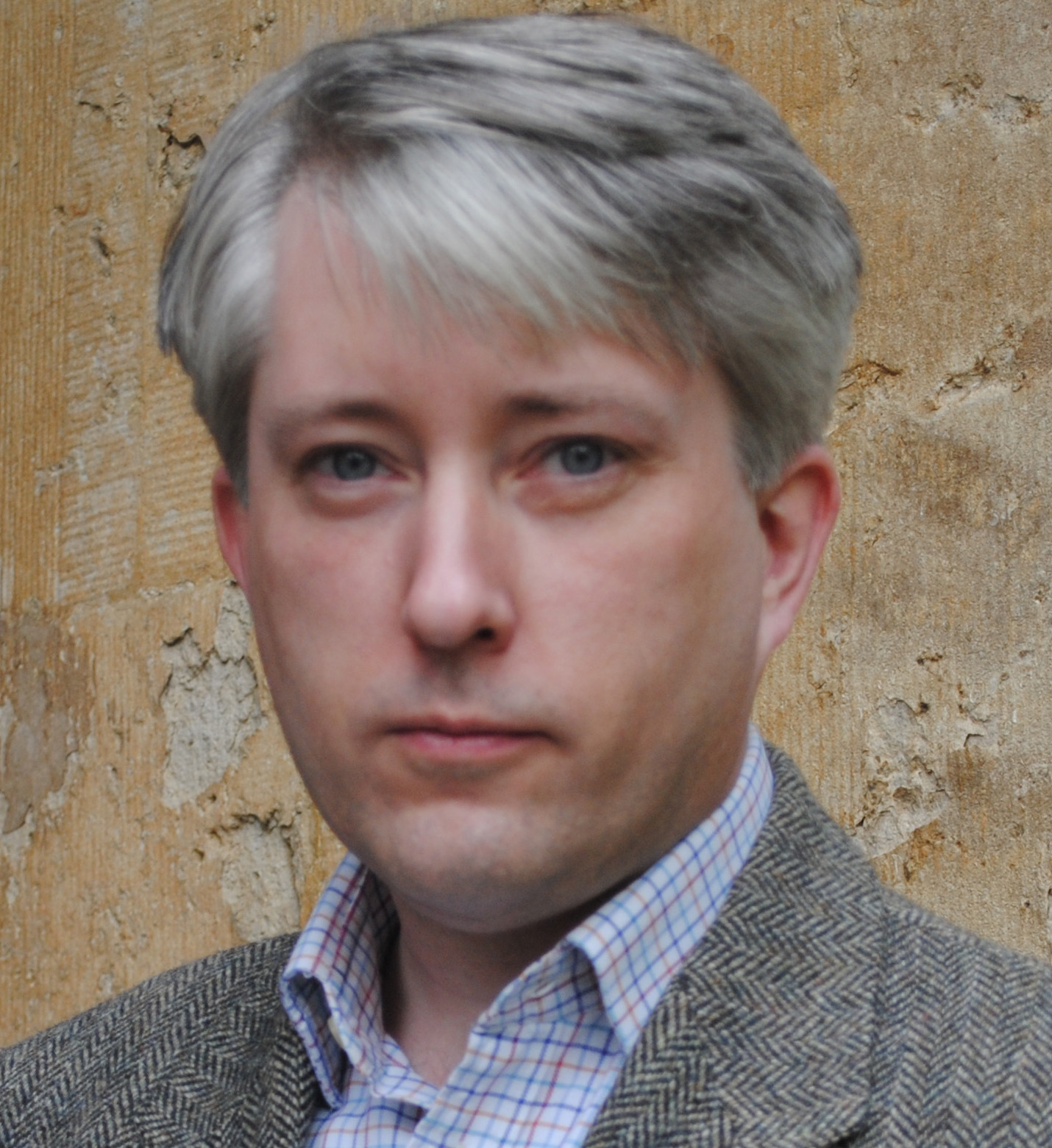
- Born: Adrian Mark Greenwood; October 1973; Horsham, Sussex, England
- Died: 6 April 2016 (aged 42); Iffley Road, Oxford, UK
- Education: Tonbridge School; Christ Church, Oxford; Imperial College London
- Occupation: Historian
- Writing career
- Subject: Military history

Adrian Mark Greenwood (October 1973 – 6 April 2016) was a British historian, biographer, author, and art dealer, with a particular interest in nineteenth-century British military history. As well as hundreds of articles on antiques and collecting, he wrote two books on military history.

== Early life ==
=== Parents ===
Greenwood's mother (now retired) was a dentist practising in Reigate, Surrey. His father, Professor Jeremy Greenwood, is also a historian, lecturer and researcher who has written a number of books, often on arcane subjects, including Fuller's Earth in Surrey 1500–1900: an Economic History (1983), The New Forest and the Navy: Timber Supplies to Portsmouth Dockyard, 1660–1790 (2004), The Posts of Sussex – the Chichester branch, 1250–1840 (1973), and Essays towards a History of Reigate (1988), a work which formed the basis of Jeremy Greenwood's doctoral thesis.

=== Education ===
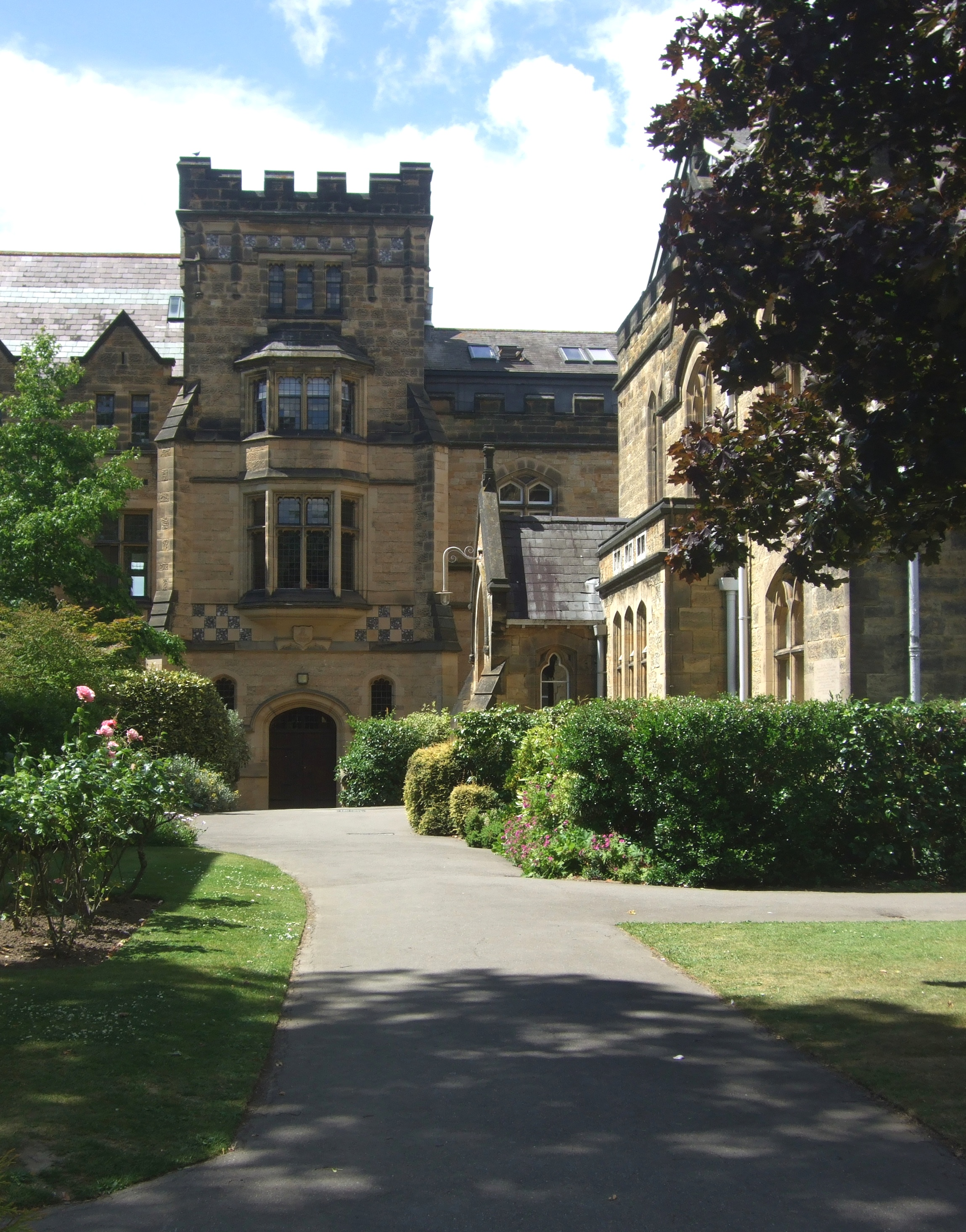
Tonbridge School

Adrian Greenwood attended the Hawthorns School, Bletchingley, Surrey, an independent co-educational preparatory school (though at the time a boys-only boarding school), and then Tonbridge School, Kent, where his history teacher for A level was Dr (later Sir) Anthony Seldon. He read Philosophy, Politics and Economics (PPE) at Christ Church, Oxford before studying for an MBA at Imperial College, London.

== Art and antiques ==
After leaving Imperial College, Greenwood began buying British Rail lost property – umbrellas, mobile phones, coats, and prams – and selling them at car boot sales around London. He soon moved on to antique furniture.

The trouble was I wasn't very good at it, and after a couple of years things got pretty desperate. To make ends meet I delivered copies of the Yellow Pages. At one point I applied for a job as a pall bearer.

Then in 1998 he sent his first article to the Antiques Bulletin, and it was published. From then on he began writing for most of the British antiques and collectables magazines, as well as several interior design and heritage titles.

=== Books online ===
In 2000 he began selling books online. "I was lucky I caught the right moment. You could go to an auction and buy a tea chest of books for £10, and then put them online for £10 each. The trouble was I ended up with five garages full with 25,000 books, so I started buying more selectively, and dealing in rare and antiquarian titles."

=== Disagreement with J. K. Rowling ===
Among Greenwood's specialities were Harry Potter books, leading, on one occasion, to an argument with the series' author J. K. Rowling. "I had bought a lot at Sothebys. It was a drawing Rowling had done of a little boy. Also there was a hand-coloured invitation to Rowling's daughter's 2nd birthday party (before Rowling's success, when she was living in Leith) and a list she had made of potential character names for the first Harry Potter book. When I put this on eBay, Rowling's literary agents demanded they be removed from sale due to 'breach of copyright.' I argued there was no breach of copyright if no pictures of the items appeared and so I sold them without images instead. I was a bit taken aback at how ferocious she was."

In November 2010, one of Greenwood's first edition Harry Potter books was stolen from a gallery in Woodstock, a theft which caught the public imagination and was widely reported. After Greenwood appeared on ITV and BBC explaining how difficult the book would be to sell on, the thief panicked and abandoned the book in a carrier bag outside a branch of Boots in Abingdon.

=== Art dealer ===
Greenwood diversified into taxidermy, classic cars, prints, maps, paintings and art, most notably works by Banksy. His sale of a safe by Banksy led to much press interest. He supplied items to a broad range of clients, including the British Library and the Getty Museum.

== Historian ==
In 2011, Greenwood retired from dealing to concentrate on writing. His first book, Victoria's Scottish Lion, a biography of Sir Colin Campbell, received very positive reviews. It is the first major biography of Campbell since 1880. "I first came across him 25 years ago when I was doing History 'A’ Level", explained Greenwood, "I couldn't understand why he wasn't more famous. Over the years I kept seeing his name in books on the Victorian army, by historians like Trevor Royle and Saul David, and he seemed by far the most brilliant general of his age, yet no one had looked at his career thoroughly for a century or more. Then, as I found out more about him, the idea of writing the story of this working class maverick, riling the Victorian establishment, became irresistible. As one reader said to me, 'You wonder why you haven't heard of this man before'."

While researching Campbell, Greenwood discovered a series of letters from Peninsular War officer, Lt Peter Le Mesurier, spanning almost the whole of the conflict.

=== Influences ===
Greenwood cited Corelli Barnett and Christopher Hibbert as stylistic influences, as historians who sought to bridge the gap between academia and popular history. "I get very tired with the old artificial distinction between academic books which have to be dull as ditchwater, and popular history which in striving to be exciting, fails to be accurate. I don't see why you shouldn't try to be engaging and well-researched."

== Death ==
Greenwood was last seen alive at the Sainsbury's supermarket in Oxford Road, Kidlington, on 5 April 2016. He was murdered the next day, and his body found by his cleaner at his home on Iffley Road the following day, 7 April. He was pronounced dead at the scene, and the cause of death was given as "multiple stab wounds" with more than 30. He was 42 years old.

Police said that the attack probably happened in the hallway of his home, and that it was a "vicious and sustained attack". They first arrested a 26-year-old man, but at that time they were still seeking the weapon used and were keeping an open mind as to motive. The arrested man was later released without charge. A first edition of the children's book The Wind in the Willows, still in its original dust-jacket and valued at £50,000, was missing.

A second person, a 50-year-old Peterborough man, Michael Danaher, was subsequently arrested on 10 April on suspicion of murder. On 12 April 2016, Danaher was charged with murder, and remanded into custody the following day. He placed The Wind in the Willows for sale on eBay the day after Greenwood's murder.

Danaher appeared in court on 15 April by video link to confirm his name, speaking from HM Prison Woodhill where he would remain until his next court appearance in July. Following a three-week trial, Danaher was found guilty at Oxford Crown Court and sentenced to life imprisonment of 34 years.

"The Wind in the Willows Murder", a documentary about the murder, aired on 19 July 2017 on Channel 4 as part of the Catching a Killer series.

== Bibliography ==
- Victoria's Scottish Lion: The Life of Colin Campbell, Lord Clyde. UK: History Press. 2015. p. 496. ISBN 978-0-75095-685-7. Archived from the original on 21 February 2016.
- Through Spain with Wellington: The Letters of Lieutenant Peter Le Mesurier of the 'Fighting Ninth'. UK: Amberley Publishing. 2016. p. 496. ISBN 978-1-44565-456-0.

=== Recent articles ===
- Sir Colin Campbell: Victoria's Scottish Lion. Durbar (journal of the Indian Military Historical Society). 2015.
- Sir Colin Campbell: The general who hated the Victoria Cross. Soldiers of the Queen (journal of the Victorian Military Society). 2015.
- Scotland's Forgotten Field Marshal. Celebrate Scotland. 2015.
- Sir Colin Campbell: Command Denied. The War Correspondent (journal of the Crimean War Research Society). 2015.
