= Therfield School =

Coeducational school in Surrey, England

Location
- Dilston Road; Leatherhead, Surrey, KT22 7NZ; England; 51.306°N 0.335°W

Information
- Type: Academy
- Motto: The Best For All — Excellence, Leadership and Opportunity
- Established: 1913
- Local authority: Surrey County Council
- Trust: South East Surrey Schools Education Trust
- Department for Education URN: 143902 Tables
- Ofsted: Reports
- Chairman of Governors: Rob Hart
- Headmaster: James Malley
- Gender: Coeducational
- Age: 11 to 18
- Enrolment: 902 as of November 2020
- Houses: Juniper, Leith, Polesden, Norbury
- Colours: Green (Therfield dark and mid shades); Red (tie stripes)
- Current admissions policy: Comprehensive
- Chairman of Therfield Trust Fund: C. Garel
- Website: www.therfield.surrey.sch.uk

Therfield School is a coeducational secondary school and sixth form located in Leatherhead, Surrey, England. Therfield School sixth form teaches courses of further education for students between the ages of 16 and 18 and has an arrangement of reciprocated entry criteria with three others in the county: The Ashcombe School, Warlingham School and Oxted School.

== History ==
The school - then known as County Upper Mixed Senior School was founded in 1913 on a site in Kingston Road, under the headship of Mr Burgess. In 1926, the Senior School took over the neighbouring site of the former County Infants' School in addition to its own as a result of expanding pupil numbers.

The school was converted into a secondary school (providing education up until the age of 15, rather than 14 as the previous senior school had) under the name Leatherhead County Secondary School in 1945 as a result of the 1944 Butler Education Act.

In 1953, the school began to move to its new site at Dilston Road, although pupils were taught at both sites and at the United Dairies Depot until 1976, when the school was renamed Therfield School after Brian de Therfield, who was granted the land the school currently stands on as part of the Manor of Pachesam by King John in 1205.

== Funding ==
A non-fee paying school, Therfield School's funding was received predominantly via pro rata Surrey County Council annual allocation. Funding since 1981 has been enhanced by donations such as through its Charities Commission-registered Therfield School Trust Fund and successful registration or selection for pupil premiums and grants restricted to central and local government-funded schools.

| Type of funding | Therfield School (2013–14) | Surrey median | National median |
|---|---|---|---|
| Government grant funding per pupil | £6,034 (98%) | £5,192 | £5,720 |
| Self-generated income per pupil | £132 (2%) | £193 | £141 |

In January 2017 the school converted to academy status, meaning that state-funding of the school comes directly from the Department for Education rather than the council.

Free school meals eligibility: 7% (band: low).

== Attributes ==
Therfield was a Specialist Sports College September 2005 — February 2008, achieving in its view its aim "to use sport as a tool to raise the whole school attainment through the focus on pupil and staff leadership skills, for Therfield to become a centre of excellence for sport" and thereafter broadening its focus.

In the house system, each of the four houses which compete in sport and other activities may constitute a single tutor group form in a given year or may be split into two. The resultant tutor forms provide a pastoral, advice point across all activities.

The proportion of pupils known to be eligible for the pupil premium funding (additional government funding for children in the care of the local authority, pupils known to be eligible for free school meals and those from service families) is below average. The proportion of disabled pupils and those with special educational needs who are supported at school action is above the national average. The proportion supported at school action plus or with a statement of special educational needs is below the national average.

The school makes arrangements for a small number of pupils in Year 10 and 11 to access alternative provision or work-related courses through ‘The Link’, a school-funded facility accommodated off site.

=== Facilities ===
The main facilities which are in time slots available for out-of-hours hire are:

- Astroturf - Hockey and Football
- Main Hall
- Dining Hall
- Sports Hall
- Sports Gym
- Tennis Courts
- Classrooms
- ICT Suites
- Library
- Cookery Classrooms

=== Sixth Form ===
Therfield Sixth Form takes as preferential applications from internal students. It has pre-arranged provision for 15 external pupils to commence Year 12 per year who meet entry requirements referred to in the Sixth Form Prospectus for the individual subjects or courses. Reciprocated special preference is given to an eclectic range of sixth forms in terms of individual programmes of study and vocational courses: at: the Ashcombe School, Dorking; Warlingham School, Warlingham; and Oxted School, Oxted.

== Ofsted ==
The Ofsted inspection of spring 2013 gave the school an overall Grade 2, Good, on the four-point scale (Outstanding/Good/Satisfactory/Inadequate). Omitting praised examples, the headline assessment of teaching was:

"Teaching has improved since the last inspection. Teaching is good in the majority of lessons and some is outstanding. Leaders and managers have challenged inadequate teaching, and skilled staff work with others to share the good practice which is in the school.

Where teaching is good or better, teachers have high expectations of pupils and encourage them to work collaboratively in pairs or small groups. They plan activities that engage and give pupils the confidence to think for themselves. As a result, relationships are supportive and this promotes pupils’ learning very effectively.

Teachers have good subject knowledge and explain clearly to pupils what they are expected to learn. They use a variety of teaching methods to engage and motivate pupils."

— School Report: Therfield School, Page 4. 21 March 2013, Ofsted: Dearden, Woods, Briggs, Singh and Collins (Senior Inspector and Assistant Inspectors)

== School partnerships ==
- Willi Graf Gymnasium, Munich, Bavaria, Germany
