= Simon King (cricketer) =

English cricketer (born 1987)

Personal information
- Full name: Simon James King
- Born: 4 September 1987 (age 39); Camberwell, Surrey, England
- Nickname: Kingy
- Height: 6 ft 1 in (1.85 m)
- Batting: Right-handed
- Bowling: Right-arm off break

Domestic team information
- Years: Team
- 2007–2011: Surrey (squad no. 14)

Career statistics
Competition	First-class	Twenty20
Matches	4	1
Runs scored	21	5
Batting average	5.25	–
100s/50s	0/0	0/0
Top score	13	5 not out
Balls bowled	513	18
Wickets	5	0
Bowling average	74.20	–
5 wickets in innings	0	–
10 wickets in match	0	–
Best bowling	3/61	–
Catches/stumpings	0/–	0/–
- Source: Cricinfo, 28 May 2011

Simon James King (born 4 September 1987) is an English former cricketer who played for Surrey from 2005 to 2011. He was educated at Warlingham School, and The John Fisher School.

Born in Camberwell, grew up in Warlingham, King is predominantly a right arm off break bowler who bats right-handed. He made his debut for Surrey's second XI in 2005, taking 17 wickets in his first season, and took a further 30 the following year. May 2006 saw King selected for the England under-19 side Vs India under-19.

King made his first-team debuts in Twenty20 and first-class cricket in 2009, appearing in matches against Kent, Middlesex and Derbyshire. His first wicket was that of Middlesex's David Nash.

He was released by Surrey at the end of the 2011 season. A season in which King hardly played due to a misdiagnosed stress fracture in his back.

His younger brother, Daryl, came through the age groups from the age of 8 through to academy, he also made appearances for Surrey's second XI in 2009.

The brothers both now run a successful cricket coaching business headquartered in Singapore called King Brothers Cricket.
