= Charlie's Promise =

English charity

Charlie's Promise is a charity based in England. Its charity number is 1207246. Its object is to prevent knife crime and to protect people from its effects. The charity was founded by the Martin and Tara Cosser, parents of Charlie Cosser, 17 years of age, who was fatally stabbed in 2023.

== Origins ==
Charlie Cosser was fatally stabbed at a party in 2023. His father, Martin Cosser, made a promise to him as he lay dying, that he would not be forgotten and has vowed to spend the rest of his life educating people about knife crime. Charlie's murderer, Yura Varybrus, aged 17, was jailed for life with a minimum term of 16 years.

== Activities ==
The charity's campaign is nationwide, and Martin Cosser has been invited to many schools to give mixed audience addresses. Charlie's old school Rodborough School have not done so. Support has been given by such as the High Sheriff of Surrey.

In July 2025, founders Martin and Tara Cosser met the King and prime minister at St James's Palace.

In April 2026, Martin and Tara Cosser were appointed Fearless ambassadors by Crimestoppers UK and Martin Cosser appeared on ITV's Good Morning Britain, where his calls for action on knife crime included giving lessons on knife crime to nine-year-olds. In July 2026, a festival organised by the charity was attended by several hundred people, the third such event since Charlie Cosser's death.

== See also ==
- Knife legislation in the UK
