= Cobham Free School =

Location
- Junior school: The Old Police Station, 89-95 Portsmouth Road, Cobham, KT11 1JJ; Senior school and Sixth Form: Main School, Portsmouth, Road Cobham, KT11 1TF Juniors, Seniors, 6th Form: Cobham, Surrey, Junior school: KT11 1JJ; Senior school: KT11 1TF; Sixth Form: KT11 1TF; England; Junior school 51°19′59″N 0°24′58″W; Senior school 51°24′25″N 0°22′23″W; Sixth Form 51°20′24″N 0°23′52″W

Information
- Type: Free school
- Motto: Optimum Omnibus (Latin for 'The best for all')
- Established: 2012
- Local authority: Elmbridge (covers town and country planning); Surrey County Council (no direct control)
- Department for Education URN: 138226 Tables
- Ofsted: Reports
- Chair of Governors: Howard Morris
- Executive Head: Michaela Khatib
- Gender: Mixed
- Age: 4 to 18
- Enrolment: 642
- Website: cobhamfreeschool.org.uk

Cobham Free School is an all-through mixed free school which has two sites in Cobham, Elmbridge, Surrey, England.

== History and sites ==
The school opened in 2012 and educates students aged 4–18 years. The primary department occupies the site of the former Cobham police station, which it moved to in 2013. Cobham Free School Senior Department and Sixth Form are both based in Munro House, the permanent main site for the school. The Senior Department was temporarily located at a former primary school site in West Molesey. The move to Munro House occurred at the start of the 2020/21 school year.

== Ofsted ==
In May 2014, the school had its first Ofsted inspection, when the school was rated to be "Good". The inspectors noted that the headteacher has an inspiring vision for the school which the whole school community was supportive of. In the 2017 and 2023 Ofsted inspections the school was again rated "Good".
