= Moon Hall School =

Location
- Flanchford Road; Leigh; Reigate, Surrey, RH2 8RE; England; 51.21193°N 0.23312°W

Information
- Type: EY Setting
- Established: 1957
- Local authority: Surrey
- Department for Education URN: 125385 Tables
- Ofsted: Reports

Moon Hall School, since 1952 an independent co-educational preparatory school at Leigh, near Reigate in Surrey, is currently, as of 2021, a special school focussing on teaching children with dyslexia.
