= Matthew Arnold School, Staines-upon-Thames =

The Matthew Arnold School

Location
- Kingston Road; Staines-upon-Thames, Middlesex, TW18 1PF; England; 51°25′35″N 0°29′15″W

Information
- Type: Academy
- Established: 1975; 51 years ago
- Local authority: Surrey County Council
- Department for Education URN: 138765 Tables
- Ofsted: Reports
- Executive Headteacher: Stephen Price
- Gender: Coeducational
- Age: 11 to 16
- Colours: blue; black
- Website: www.matthew-arnold.surrey.sch.uk

The Matthew Arnold School is a co-educational secondary school with academy status located in Staines-upon-Thames, Surrey, England. The school was opened by Lord Lucan on 24 May 1954 and educates pupils from the age of 11 (Year 7) to 16 (Year 11). It is named after the 19th-century poet Matthew Arnold, who lived in nearby Laleham.

== Admissions ==
The Matthew Arnold School is on the outskirts of the east of Staines-upon-Thames, south of the A308, towards Ashford. It has transport links via buses 117 and 290, and via trains at Staines railway station. Matthew Arnold takes in many pupils from a variety of schools located around Staines-upon-Thames and surrounding areas, including Buckland Primary School, Laleham Church of England School, Riverbridge Primary School, Town Farm Primary School, Our Lady of Rosary, Stanwell Fields, Clarendon, Ashford Park, Echelford Primary School and many more.

== History ==
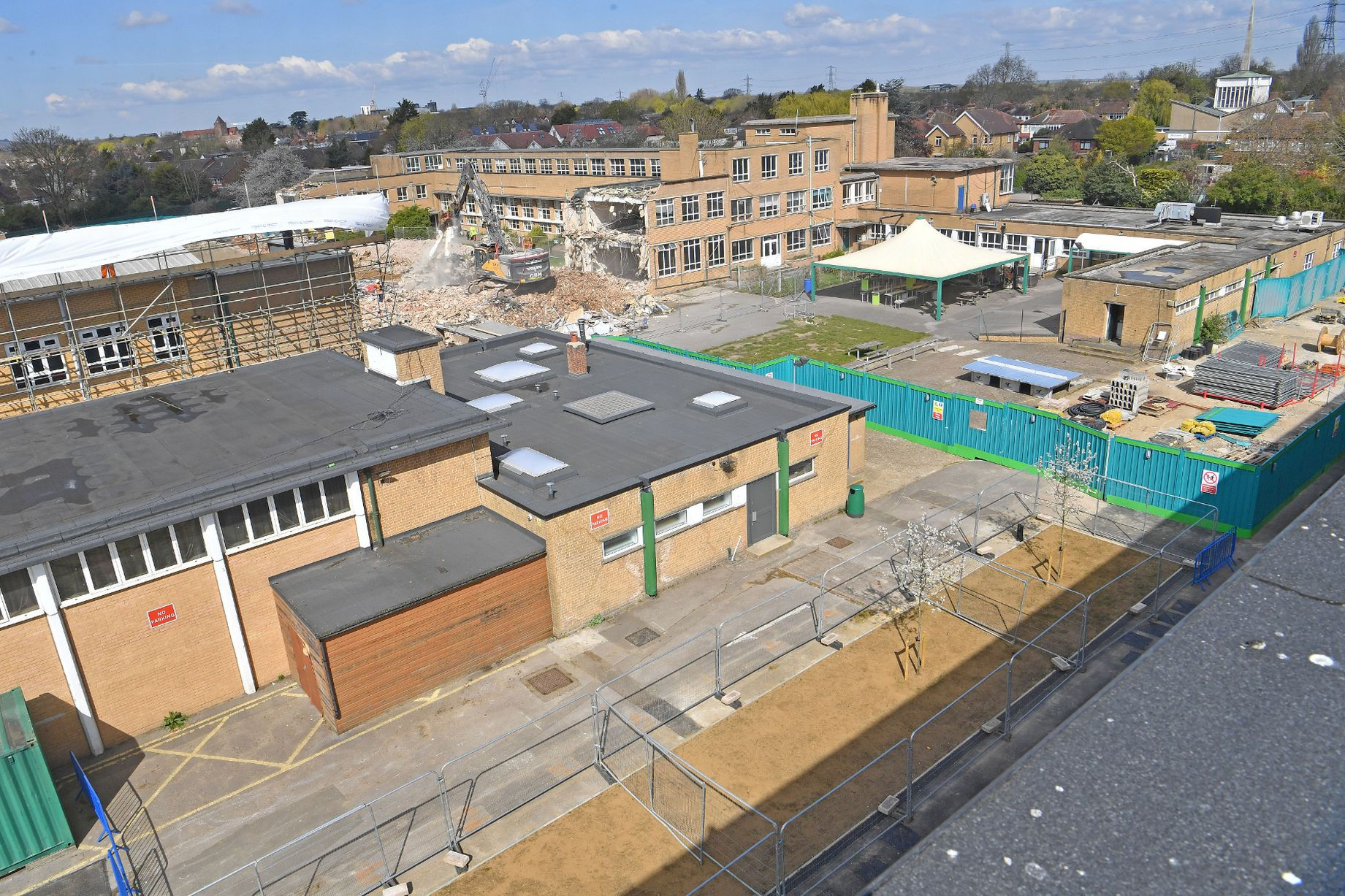
Demolition of the old school buildings in 2021

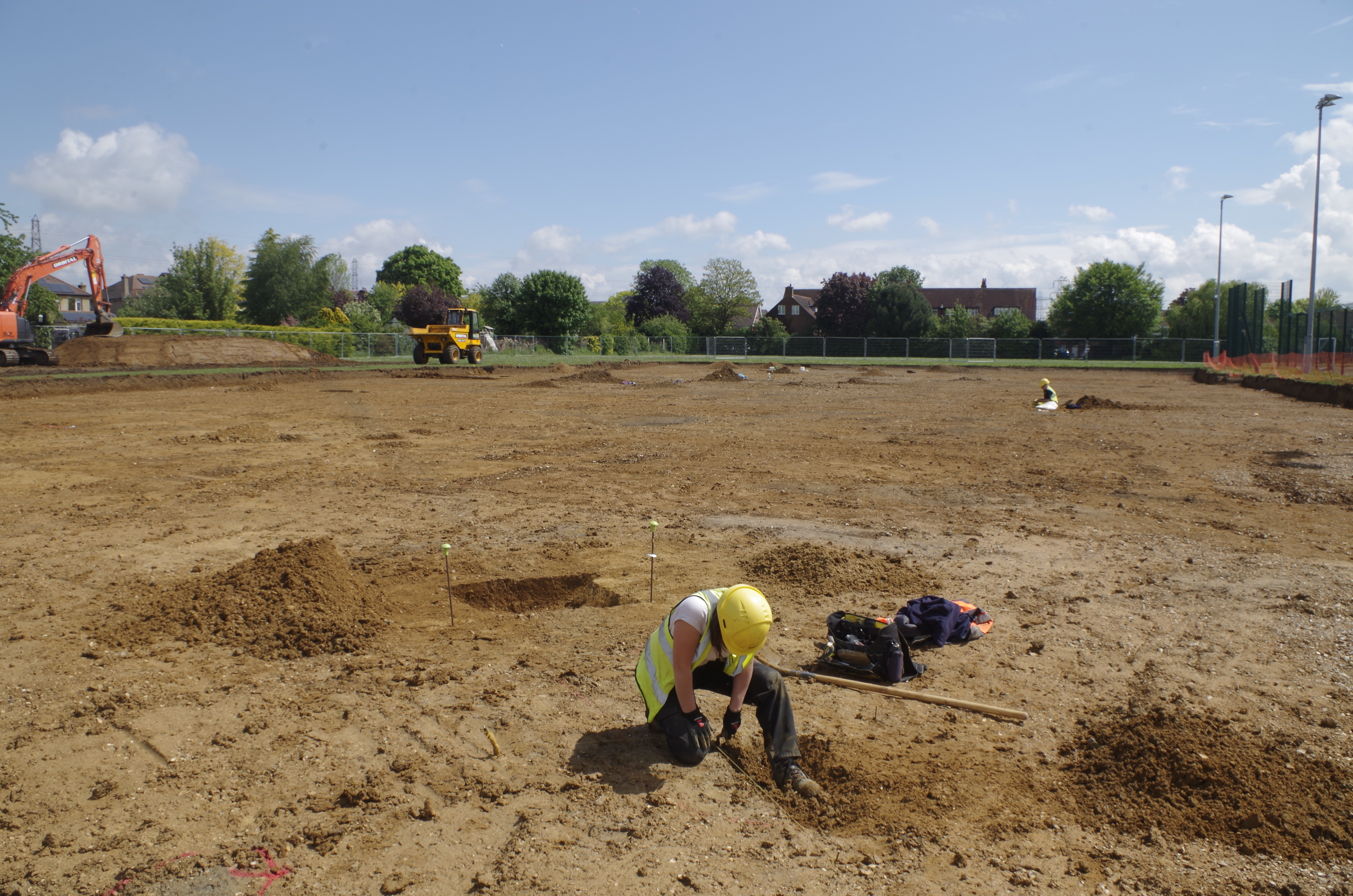
Archaeological survey prior to construction of the new school buildings in 2019

Aerial photographs taken on two occasions in 1933 illustrate the progress of construction of new housing in the immediate vicinity of the survey area. Photographs also show the cropmarks of a supposed Roman enclosure in the playing fields of the school. Subsequent aerial photographs, taken at regular intervals from the late 1940s to present also record cropmarks of the enclosure. The site was partially excavated in 1989-1990 and although the dating is inconclusive, it is suggested that the enclosures are of medieval date.

The Matthew Arnold School began before the Second World War as a hospital, and some pupils were admitted before hostilities started (the boys section). The School was completed after the war as two Secondary Modern Schools. There was no state Grammar School in Staines-upon-Thames. Boys and Girls who passed the 11+ went to Ashford County School (Mixed) or Hampton Grammar School (boys only). With comprehensivisation in the 1970s Matthew Arnold became a mixed comprehensive school. The school became an academy in 2012.

Construction was completed in January 2021 whereupon the old building was demolished and replaced by new facilities built by Wates Construction company with funding by the government’s Priority School Building Programme 2 (PSBP2), which aims to rebuild or replace the schools in the worst condition across the UK.

In September 2021 the school uniform was updated, and the school's colours were changed from Green and Yellow to Black and Blue.

== Academic performance ==
In January 2008 the school was awarded "The Most Improved School in the Country".

In 2014 the school was placed in special measures following an Ofsted inspection report that rated the school as 'inadequate'. As part of an improvement plan the school has joined the Bourne Education Trust, a Surrey-based multi-academy trust that includes Epsom and Ewell High School and Jubilee High School.

== Fictitious alumni ==
Ali G, the fictional character created by comedian Sacha Baron Cohen, called it "Da Matthew Arnold Skool".

== See also ==
- Matthew Arnold School (Oxford)
