= Addlestone =

Town in Surrey, England

Coordinates: 51.3695°N 0.4901°W

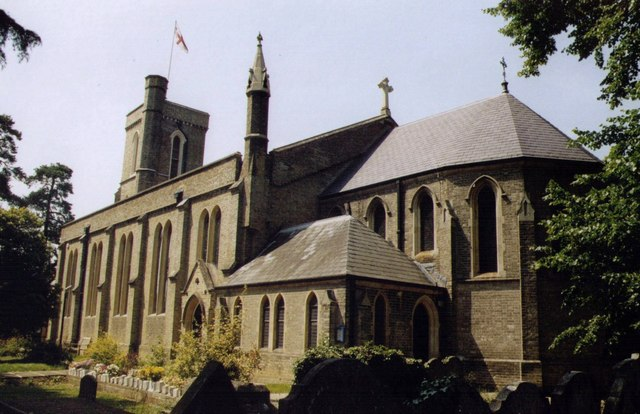
- St. Paul's Church, Addlestone

- Location within Surrey
- Area: 4.87 km^{2} (1.88 sq mi)
- Population: 15,883 (2011 census; Addlestone Built-up Area, which excludes New Haw and Woodham in the post town)
  - Density: 3,261/km^{2} (8,450/sq mi)
- OS grid reference: TQ052644
  - London: 18 1/2 mi (30 km)
- District: Runnymede
- Shire county: Surrey
- Region: South East
- Country: England
- Sovereign state: United Kingdom
- Post town: Addlestone
- Postcode district: KT15
- Dialling code: 01932
- Police: Surrey
- Fire: Surrey
- Ambulance: South East Coast
- UK Parliament: Runnymede and Weybridge

Addlestone (/ˈædəlstən/ or /ædəlstoʊn/) is a town in Surrey, England. It is located approximately 18 1/2 miles (30 kilometres) southwest of London. The town is the administrative centre of the Borough of Runnymede, of which it is the largest settlement.

== Geography ==
Addlestone is approximately 10 miles (16 kilometres) northeast of Guildford and 18 1/2 mi (30 km) southwest of London.

Narrow green buffers separate the town from Weybridge, Chertsey and Ottershaw. There is no precisely defined southern boundary with New Haw.

Addlestone is home to the ancient Crouch Oak tree, under which it is said Queen Elizabeth I picnicked. It also marked the edge of Windsor Forest before it was largely cut down for fields and settlements.

=== Elevation, soil and geology ===
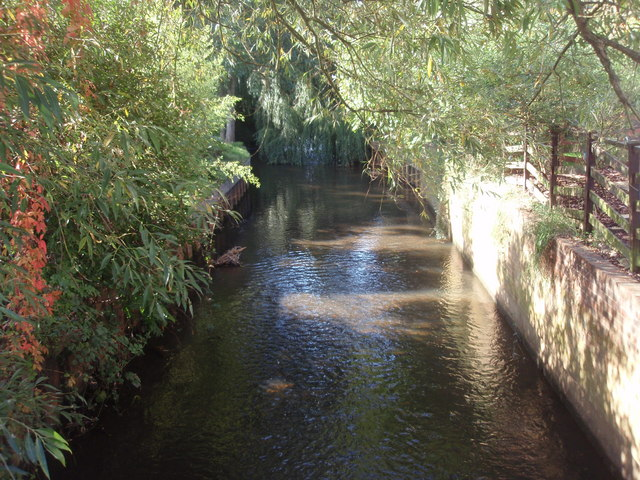
The Bourne to the east of Addlestone forms part of the lower watercourse of the Windle Brook and Lightwater

Elevations range between 11 and 40 metres (36 and 131 ft). The maximum is on Row Hill recreation ground, Row Town, Addlestone; a ridge that continues to the northwest of Row Town where it is known as Ongar/Spinney Hill, where Great Grove Farm in its centre also reaches this height; the minimum is by the Thames and along the Woburn Park Stream which is the main distributary of The Bourne the main waterway of the village, a stream rising as the Windle Brook in Windlesham cutting a shallow ravine, flowing past the McLaren Technology Centre and Woodham then passing to the east of the village.

Eminences of the Bagshot Sand stand out above the river most notably the western hills mentioned and Woburn Hill which is 25 metres (82 ft) AOD compared to St Ann's Hill, Chertsey's 61 metres (200 ft), however, is part of the landscape critical to Woburn Park and the private gardens of Woburn Hill.

Major climate changes in Britain causing sea level changes in the last 2.58 million years, with mini Ice Ages, the ice sheets did not extend to Surrey but sand and gravel deposits swept towards the fledgling River Thames were spread in all lower parts. Gravel terraces at various heights on the valley sides are the remnants of successive floodplains, the highest terrace being the oldest and the lowest the youngest. The most prominent terraces mark the former levels of the Thames in north Surrey. Along tributary slopes, a deposit, head, forms the main sediment of latest age. Head comprises angular pieces of rock and soil derived locally from the extensive frost-shattering of rocks and the subsequent movement of this material down valley slopes.

Soil is predominantly "loamy soil with naturally high groundwater". Woburn Hill has "slowly permeable seasonally wet slightly acid but base-rich loamy and clayey soil". New Haw, the southern part of the Addlestone post town and historically a part has "freely draining slightly acid loamy soils"; so does Great Grove Farm. West of the M25 as far as the centre of Ottershaw is a belt of "slightly acid loamy and clayey soils with impeded drainage" soil.

== Demography ==
At the 2001 census, Addlestone was recorded as having a population of 16,657, making it the largest settlement in the Borough of Runnymede.

The four wards in Addlestone have their own semi-permanent (land use) profiles: Addlestone Bourneside has the greatest proportion of privately rented homes, Addlestone North of socially rented homes. Housing in Chertsey South and Row Town which is mostly Row Town was, in 2011, 86% owner-occupied with or without a loan, the third highest proportion in Runnymede. Offices and factories are below the local averages for areas within the M25 – the most common land use being parks, playing fields, flood meadows/woodland, farms and golf courses in the form of Green Belt buffer land mentioned. The M25 motorway accounts for the relatively large proportion of land devoted to roads for the density of population and housing.

2011 Published Statistics: Population, home ownership and extracts from Physical Environment, surveyed in 2005
Output area	Homes owned outright	Owned with a loan	Socially rented	Privately rented	Other	km^{2} roads	km^{2} water	km^{2} domestic gardens	km^{2} domestic buildings	km^{2} non-domestic buildings	Usual residents	km^{2}
Addlestone North	953	874	366	366	22	0.188	0.070	0.615	0.130	0.063	5596	2.23
Addlestone Bourneside	738	1028	318	364	30	0.239	0.011	0.496	0.134	0.073	5905	2.64
Chertsey South and Row Town	826	927	140	142	21	0.270	0.007	0.680	0.151	0.017	5328	3.18
New Haw	753	1108	204	266	22	0.257	0.139	0.652	0.162	0.053	5757	3.57

== History ==
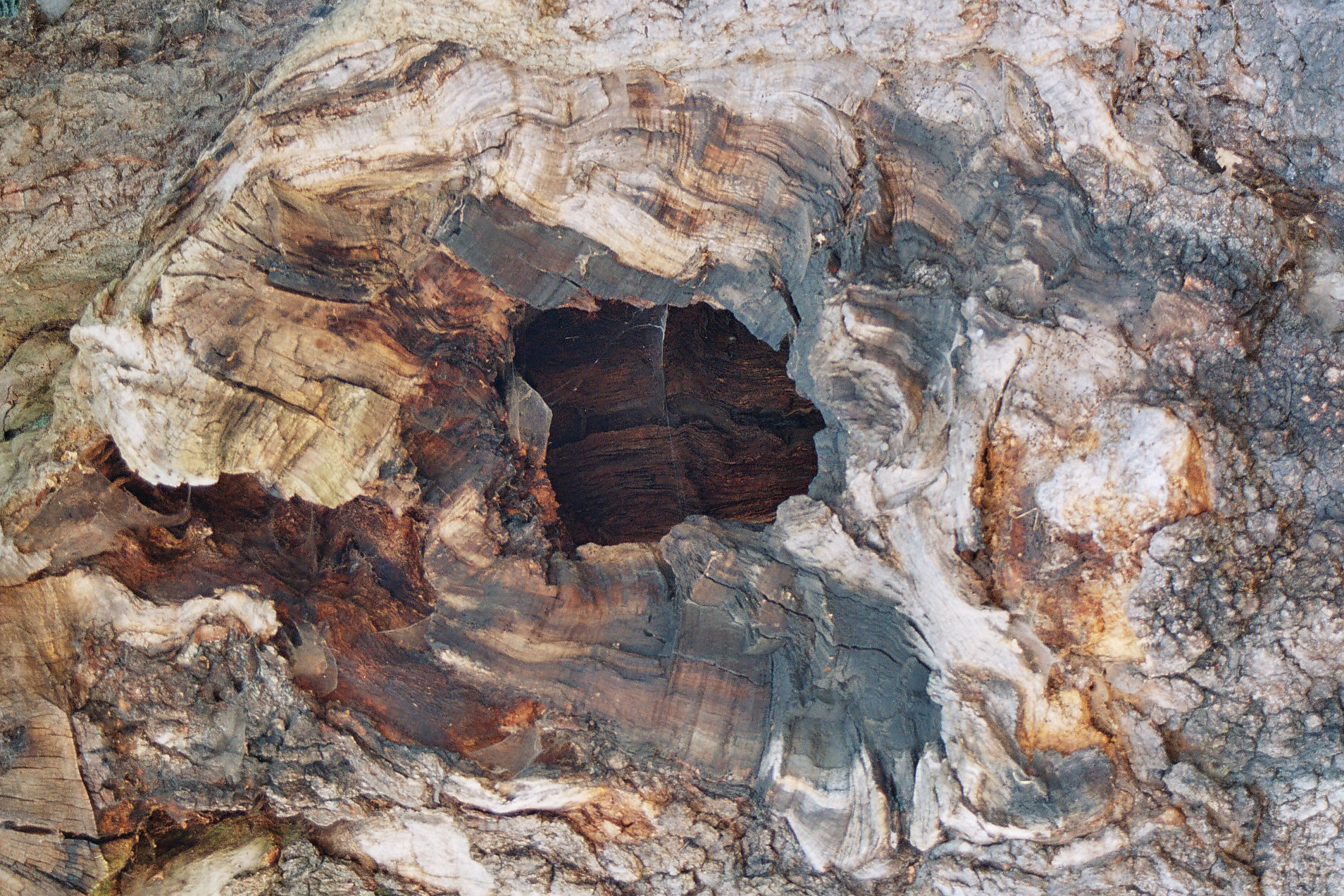
Detail of the Crouch Oak. The tree is hollow, but still alive.

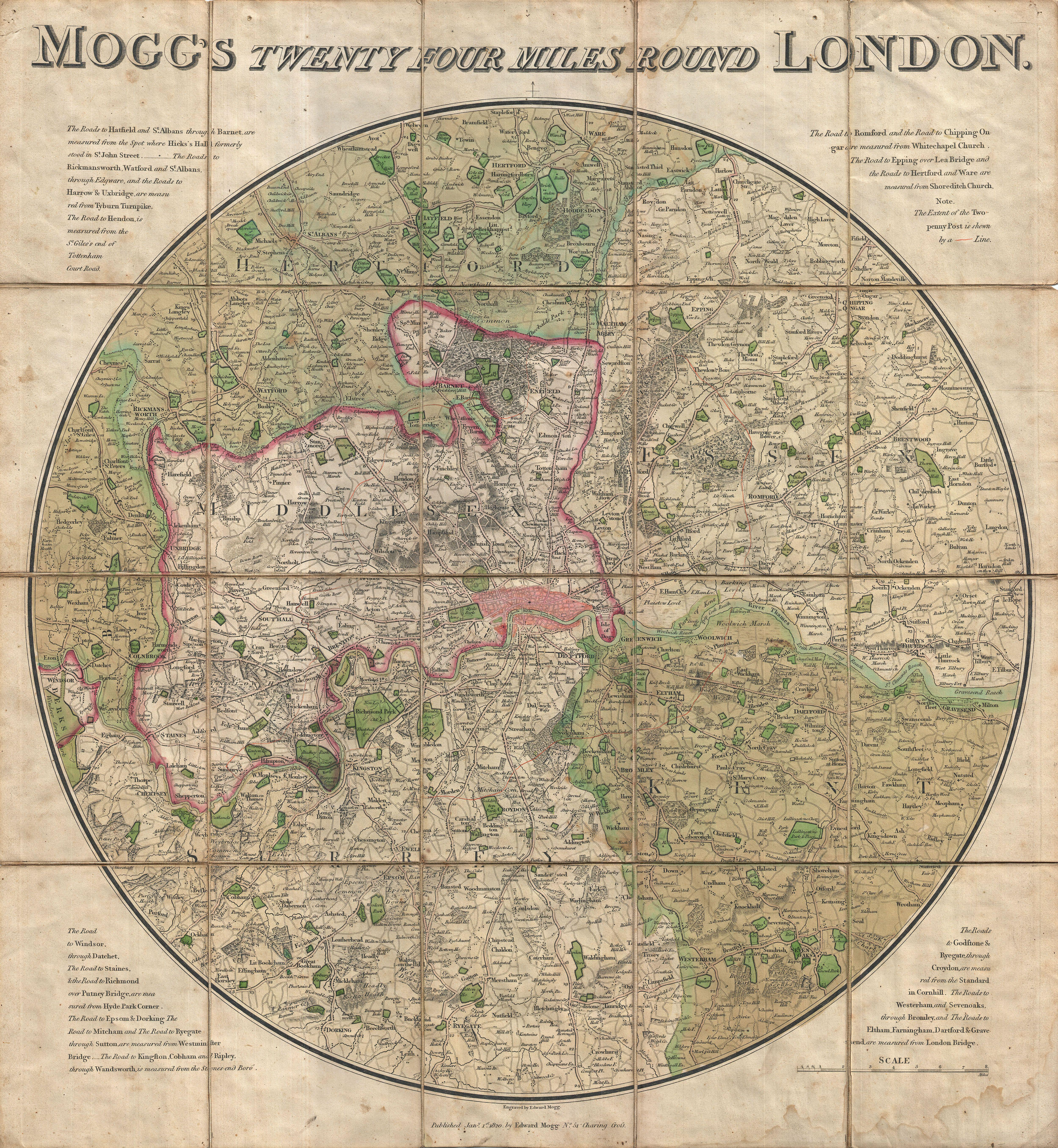
Extract from Mogg's Twenty Four Miles Round London, 1820

The name Addlestone probably means "Attel's Denu": the valley belonging to a Saxon named Attel.

Addlestone, historically called Atlesdon or Atlesford, was a part of Chertsey ecclesiastical parish (Note: This division was simply called a parish before coming of civil parishes the 19th century), the basic unit of civil administration.

In 1241 the place was listed as "Attelsdene" and by 1610 John Speed's map shows "Adleston", halfway between named hills St. Annhill and St. Georg Hill, just south of the Thames.

The Crouch Oak, an oak tree believed to have originated in the 11th Century, is an important symbol of the town. It used to mark the boundary of Windsor Great Park. Legend says that Queen Elizabeth I stopped by it and had a picnic. The tree is one of the main historic features of the town, and consequently several local businesses use its name in their title. It survived an arson attack in September 2007.

Ongar Hill (Note: Per Malden: in 1911 the "seat of" Henry Cobbett, in 1911.), in the 18th century a country house and farm now smaller homes and motorway, belonged to Vice-Admiral Sir Hyde Parker the elder (d. 1782) instrumental in the Seven Years' War against Spanish interests in India and the Philippines and in the American War of Independence involved with action containing French forces based in Martinique.

Sayes Court, Addlestone, now a junior school and residential estate before demolition was a country house of a family named Moore from the 17th to the end of the 18th century. In 1823 it became the property of Sir Charles Wetherell, Recorder (judge) of Bristol, who had it rebuilt or at least considerably altered.

=== Chertsey Beomond Manor/Woburn Park ===
Addlestone, including St George's College's grounds of Woburn Park and the remaining farms and water meadows designated Green Belt were the western strip of Chertsey Manor or Chertsey Beomond Manor (to distinguish it from others), possessed by Chertsey Abbey from the grant of land by Frithwald, subregulus of Surrey, at a date between the years 666 and 675 CE until the dissolution of the monasteries.

Adam de Woburn lived at Woburn Park in 1260

Only thirteen years after 1537 the Crown was content to lease the land rather than continue with a steward (office) so Sir William Fitz William (later his widow) held the whole Chertsey Beomond manor from 1550 to 1574; later Sir Francis Bacon held it for the infant Charles I who granted it specifically for his Queen, Henrietta Maria (of France). During the Commonwealth of England, the government sold the manor to William Aspinall who sold 292 trees of Birch Wood there for the Navy; however taken back by the Crown at the Restoration of the monarchy and the first of many leases was granted; the first lease was to the first Lord Holles. For example, from 1779 to 1803 the Duke of Bridgwater held it and from an unknown date until 1827 the British Commander-in-Chief Prince Frederick, Duke of York and Albany, famed for the nursery rhyme and the Duke of York Column by St James's Palace and Carlton Terrace was tenant of the lands. (Note: In 1828 £3,330 was paid for the "manor [title] and other crown lands" finally being divided into auction lots on the bankruptcy of James Goren in 1834.)

In the 1740s, the famed gardener, Philip Southcote, chose to construct a two-storey house. Now a Grade II listed building, it was also named Woburn Park, with an original ornamented farm (ferme ornée) on Woburn Hill with fields for cattle or crops, decorated with statues, grotto, vases, temples, archways and other features, much of which survives as part of St George's College. The subsequent owners of Woburn Park were: (Note: Woburn Park's actual park as mentioned forms the grounds of St George's College, open by appointment and on visitor days and is separately Grade II listed: Historic England. "Details from listed building database (1260104)". National Heritage List for England.)

- 1783 Lord Petre
- 1816 Vice Admiral Charles Stirling, listed in deeds as Admiral Stirling but Vice-Admiral
- 1834 Lord and Lady King, later Lord (Earl of and Countess of) Lovelace
- 1862 Lord (2nd Earl of) Kilmorey

=== Since 1800 ===
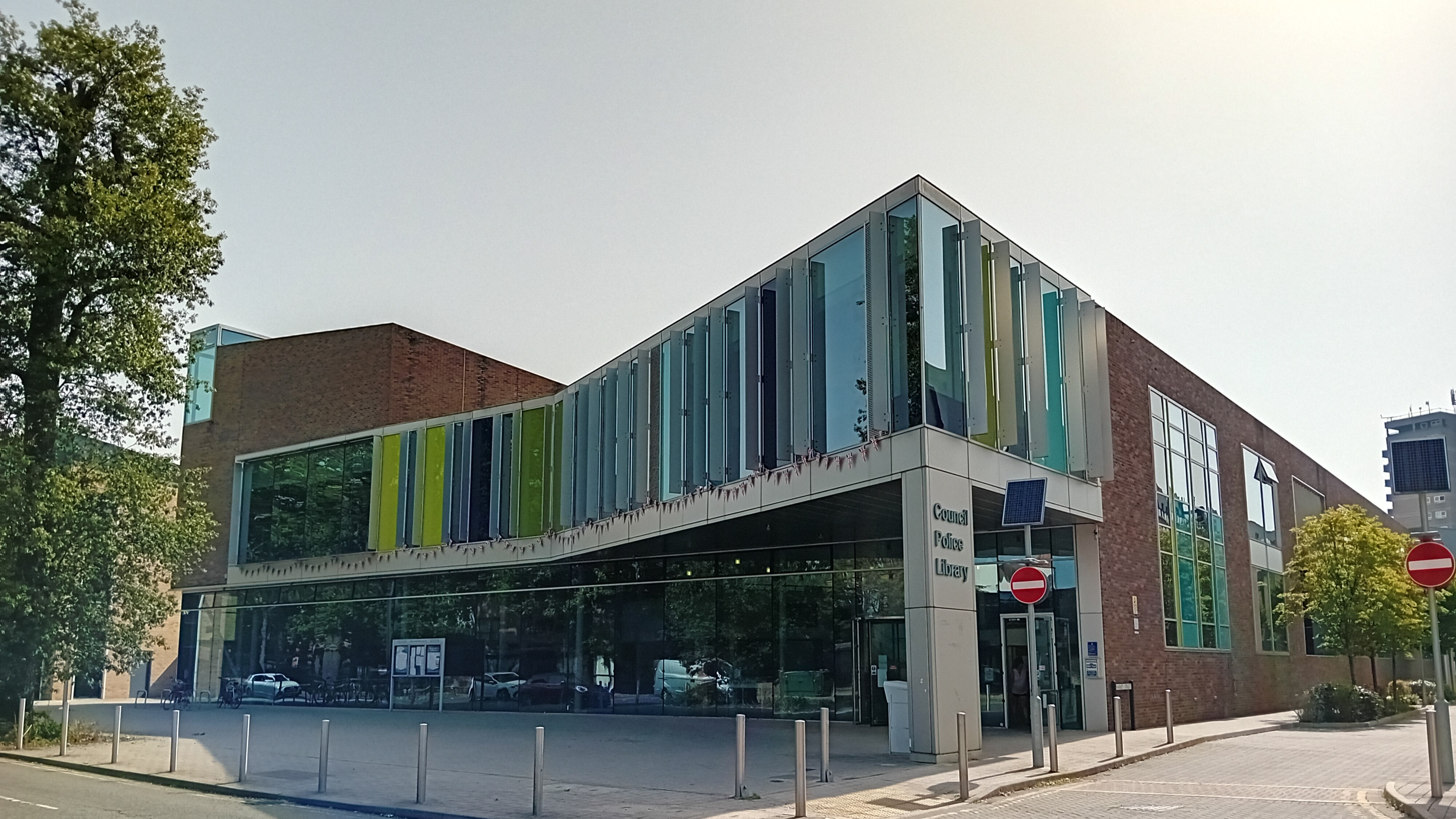
Runnymede Civic Centre

Chertsey poor law union's workhouse was in Addlestone and was built in 1836–8. Addlestone chapel was added in 1868. The Village Hall was built in 1887 by the Addlestone Village Hall Company. The Princess Mary Village Homes at Addlestone were established by the organisation and patronage of the Duchess of Teck (Princess Mary of Cambridge) in 1871: certified industrial schools for female children of prisoners, or children otherwise in a destitute or dangerous position. They were conducted on the separate homes system, and are supported by voluntary contributions, with a Treasury allowance for children committed under the Industrial Schools Act. Addlestone's schools were mostly founded in this period: St. Paul's Primary School, built 1841, enlarged 1851 and 1885, initially for girls and infants. Chertsey Urban District took over all roles of the parish and of the "Godley Hundred" under the Local Government Act 1894. A boys' school was added in 1901. New Ham School was built in 1874. St. Augustine's School (Church) for infants was built in 1882, and Chapel Park (a church-sponsored School) in 1896.

A Baptist chapel was built in Addlestone in 1872, and a Wesleyan chapel in 1898. Another ecclesiastical district of Addlestone, though today separated now by the residential development of New Haw, called Woodham and closer to the major town of Woking was formed in 1902 on what were the boundaries of Chertsey parish and Horsell parish.

By 1911 the ecclesiastical district and ward Addlestone could be considered to have outstripped the original centre of the parish, Chertsey, in importance. According to the Victoria County History published in that year:

This ward contains the largest number of people of the three wards [Chertsey, Addlestone, and Outer Ward] into which the Chertsey Urban District was divided, and the number of new houses shows the growing character of the neighbourhood.

On Station Road, a large Blériot aircraft factory was built in 1917; its several hundred aeroplanes were taken by road to Brooklands for final assembly and test flying. In the 1950s the site was taken over by Weymann to build buses and coaches who built the prototype of the AEC Routemaster bus ceasing trade in the mid-1960s. Caddy's acquired part of the site to manufacture taxis followed in 1967 by Plessey which moved from Chessington. In 1990, the site was used by Marconi. These companies were important local employers. By 2000 the site was derelict. The site was redeveloped in the early 2010s as a business park: Aviator Park. Some of the offices have since been converted into flats with more housing being built behind.

Runnymede Civic Centre, which houses the offices of Runnymede Borough Council, Addlestone Police Station and the local library, opened in 2008.

== Education ==
There are a range of state-funded primary schools in Addlestone which include St Paul's C of E Primary School, Ongar Place, Sayes Court, The Holy Family Catholic Primary School and Darley Dene Infant school. A few nurseries also serve the wider-area community.

There are two state-funded secondary schools in Addlestone: Chertsey High School and Jubilee High School.

Philip Southcote School is a state-funded special school located in Addlestone.

St George's College is privately funded. The school relocated from Croydon to Woburn Park in 1884. All non-junior parts of the school occupy Woburn Park, Addlestone. Regular football matches are played on this field by the local football team, Hythe Hornets.

== Landmarks ==
=== The George Inn ===
Heading north from the town, towards the Addlestonemoor five-way, two-lane roundabout is a Grade II listed building at the renaming Brighton Road to Chertsey Road, the George Inn, This Inn is a Tudor Period building with 18th century and later alterations and has three gables facing the road. It is now boarded up. Almost opposite is another listed building split into two houses: nos 114–116 Chertsey Road, early 19th century, slate-roofed houses with sash windows.

=== Woburn Hill ===
Woburn Hill is a large house built in 1815 spread over three storeys, that features a moulded cornice and fluted Greek Doric columns to its porch with an iron balustrade above it forming a balcony in front of a central window of the floor above.

== Localities ==
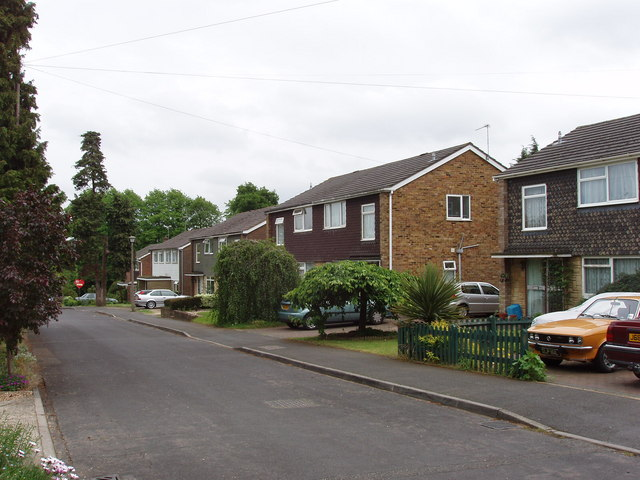
Typical Houses of Row Hill

=== Rowhill or Row Hill ===
Row Hill forms a residential estate with shops of a butcher, baker and electrical appliance store that is contiguous with Addlestone to its west. These shops are on Ongar Hill not Row Hill and hence the name Ongar Parade, also known locally as "Top shops" due to being at the top of Row Town.

=== Addlestone Moor ===
Addlestone Moor has a public house, now closed 08/2013, flood meadows, a sports pitch and a mobile home park. It is also home to the Runnymede Rockets BMX Club. Its roundabout marks on the closer side of town has five exits and is used for motorway access from primarily Addlestone, Weybridge, Shepperton, Laleham and Chertsey.

== Sport ==
The town's lawn bowls club, Addlestone Victory Park, won Bowls England's "Story of the Year" award in February 2022 after its president, Barrie de Suys, aged 87, walked 2,400 0.6 mile laps of the park during lockdown for the club. He also raised over £10,000 for the Royal National Institute for the Blind. Formed in 1931 it was reduced to five members at the start of the 2021, recovering to forty members by the end of that Season. In 2022 it increased its membership to one hundred and five, making it the fastest growing bowls club in England. It also runs the largest junior section in Bowls Surrey. In February 2023 it won a "Highly Commended" notice at the Runnymede Borough Council Civic Awards. It runs an annual Open Days at the end of May.

Abbey Rangers play at Addlestone Moor, on the Thames winter flood meadows (prior to the construction of the Thames Barrier) next to the disused Woburn Arms and the athletics track in Woburn Park which is now St George's RC College. Lyne FC play at Jubilee High School.

The now-defunct Addlestone & Weybridge Town were established as Addlestone Town in 1885 and played at their ground in Liberty Lane until their dissolution in 1985. There is now housing on the site of the club's ground.

=== Perpetual Motion squad ===
A Rocket League esports team managed by local gamers.

== Economy, culture and community ==
Addlestone is mentioned in H. G. Wells' book The War of the Worlds, in which the second of ten Martian invasion ships (called 'cylinders') lands at the Addlestone Golf Links. This is probably a reference to New Zealand Golf Club (founded 1895) on Woodham Lane – the road from Woking to Addlestone – and not the Abbey Moor Golf Course which was only established in 1989.

Addlestone Library is co-located with Runnymede Borough Council and Addlestone Police in the Runnymede Civic Centre built in 2008 at a cost of £12,700,000 with atriums and courtyards on Station Road and opposite Addlestone Health Centre.

Its main road is Station Road which has many shops, two supermarkets, Addlestone Methodist Church, a doctors' NHS surgery, the Aviator business park and the Eileen Tozer Day Centre; the civic centre of Runnymede borough council is on this street.

Station Road hosts a 2011-completed business (office) estate, Aviator Park, in glass and steel which has landscaped verges with trees, shrubs and grass. Some of which has been since converted into housing.

In July 2015, Bouygues Development commenced work on a new, large scale town centre regeneration called, "Addlestone ONE". Located along Station Road and next to Runnymede Civic Centre, when complete in 2017, the project will create 213 new homes, a Premier Inn hotel, a Waitrose supermarket, a premium 6-screen cinema operated by The Light Cinemas, new public spaces, various restaurants and shops as well as a multi-storey car park. The Ground Breaking Ceremony for the development took place on 23 October 2015 and was officiated by Foreign Secretary, the Rt. Hon. Philip Hammond.

A 2023 review highlighted that Station Road, Addlestone high street has more potholes than open businesses operating in the town centre regeneration project. With one large pothole directly outside the project containing its own pothole within itself. When interviewed, one local upstanding resident was quoted as saying "there is less craters on the moon, than on the road through Addlestone to Ottershaw" "The council could look at opening multiple new public swimming pools in a few of the potholes".

== Transport ==
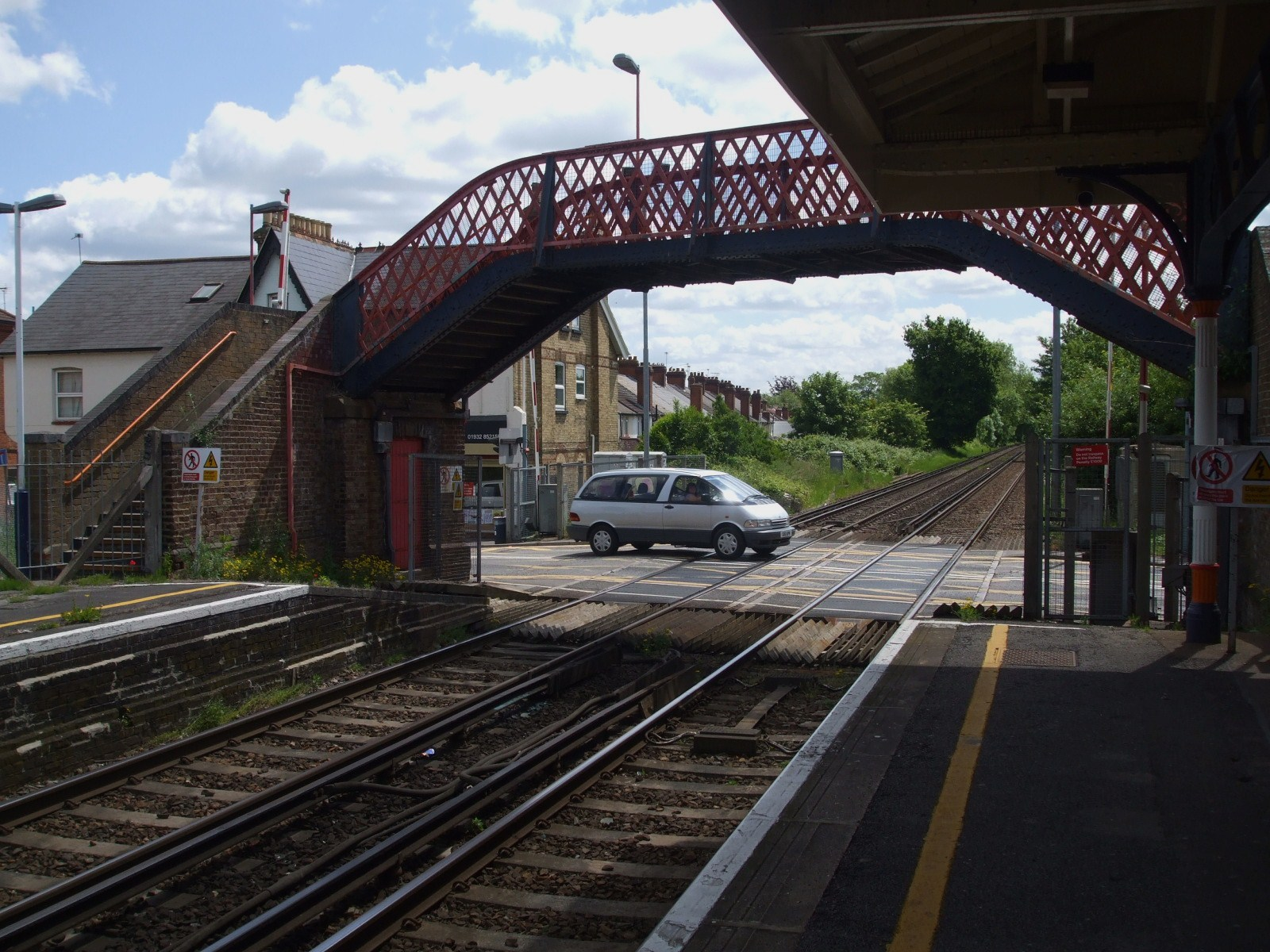
Addlestone Railway Station

=== Road ===
Station Road joins into surrounding A-roads in all directions, including non-principal "Brighton Road" which has since become superseded by the motorway network and other north–south roads, the A319 that links in towards routes to Berkshire and the A320 road that is convenient for closer areas of Thames Valley corridor, and the A318 to Brooklands with its museum, luxury hotel and retail park and the A3 road Painshill interchange between Hersham and Cobham towards London.

The M25 can be accessed from Addlestone at junction 11.

=== Rail ===
Addlestone railway station is operated South Western Railway and is served by services running between London Waterloo and Guildford. Journey times to London Waterloo are between 30 and 50 minutes.

=== Air ===
London Heathrow Airport is located 10.8 miles from Addlestone to which it is connected by bus services and the M25.

=== Buses ===
Addlestone has four principal bus services. An hourly service to Slough via Staines upon Thames and Windsor and in the other direction to the Brooklands retail park operates: bus 51:
Another service with 2 buses per hour is the 461 which goes from Chertsey to Kingston upon Thames and bus 446 between Woking and Staines upon Thames.

=== River navigation ===
The Wey Navigation canal runs to the south east of the town. Coxes lock is the deepest unmanned lock on the Navigation with a fall of 8 feet 6 inches (2.59 m).

== Notes and references ==
Notes
