= Pond Meadow School =

Location
- Larch Avenue; Guildford, Surrey, GU1 1DR; England; 51.2556°N 0.5788°W

Information
- Type: Special school; Academy
- Established: c. 1980
- Local authority: Surrey
- Department for Education URN: 141533 Tables
- Ofsted: Reports
- Chair of Governors: Alex Page
- Head teacher: Emily Hayward
- Staff: 31 teaching, 118 support
- Gender: Coeducational
- Age: 2 to 19
- Enrolment: 149
- Colours: Purple and green
- Website: www.pond-meadow.surrey.sch.uk}

Pond Meadow School is a small special school with academy status located in Guildford, Surrey, England for pupils aged 2 – 19.

== History ==
The school was officially opened by Prince Philip, Duke of Edinburgh, in 2009. It replaced the Bishop Reindorp School, built in the 1960s.

In 2015, a minibus used by the school caught fire with eight children onboard. Three of the children were wheelchair users and were unable to leave the bus independently. They were rescued by the driver and some passers-by. Nobody was harmed in the incident.
