= East Surrey College =

East Surrey College (ESC)

Location
- Gatton Point; London Road; Redhill, Surrey, RH1 2JX; United Kingdom

Information
- Department for Education URN: 130824 Tables
- Ofsted: Reports
- Principal & CEO: Lindsay Pamphilon
- Gender: Mixed
- Age: 14 to 16+
- Colour: Green
- Website: http://www.esc.ac.uk/

East Surrey College is a general further education college in the north of the town of Redhill, Surrey, England. The college has over 2,500 classroom-based students and 1,000 community learners.

== History ==
East Surrey College traces its origins to two separate institutions founded in the late 19th century. The first technical education classes in Redhill began in 1894 and the foundation stone for Redhill Technical Institute was laid in April 1895. The premises, on Redstone Hill, were designed by the local firm Baker and Penfold and were opened in December of the same year. In 1969, the college began to transfer the majority of its activities to Gatton Point, London Road, previously the premises of The Hawthorns School. The Redstone Hill site was retained as an annex until 1989, when courses in travel and tourism were moved to the former St Nicholas' School site at Gatton Point South. The former institute was demolished in 1990.

The Reigate School of Art was founded in 1882, having grown from a programme of science and arts classes that had been held in the town public hall. It moved to the Redhill Technical Institute in 1895 and to Blackborough Road, Reigate, in 1939.

East Surrey College was created in 1983, through the merger of Redhill Technical College and the Reigate School of Art and Design. The college became independent of Surrey County Council in 1992. Following a £43M campus redevelopment project completed in May 2010, Elizabeth II opened a new recording studio, spa and hair salon at the college in November of the following year.

East Surrey College merged with John Ruskin College in South Croydon in February 2019, to form Orbital South Colleges.

== Subject areas ==
Subject areas include:

- Accounting
- Applied Science
- Arts, Crafts, Design & Media
- Business, Information & Communications
- Computing
- Construction:
  - Bricklaying
  - Carpentry
  - Electrical Installation
  - Painting & Decorating
  - Plumbing
- Cooking
- Creative Arts
- Counselling
- ESOL & EFL
- Engineering & Electronics
- Fitness & Well-being
- Floristry & Horticulture
- Hair, Beauty & Holistic Therapies
- Health, Social Care & Early Years
- Home & Garden
- ICT
- Languages
- Motor Vehicle
- Public Services
- Skills for Life
- Sports
- Supported Learning
- Teaching
- Travel, Tourism & Airline Operations

The college maintains working relationships with local businesses, professional organisations, local schools and other providers of post-16 education.

== College services and facilities ==
The college has a Learning Support Service and a resource centre for students. It also operates a Visual Impairment Support Service in partnership with the RNIB.

Its hair, beauty and holistic therapy salon offers various treatments and services to the public.

The studios of the Reigate School of Art, Design & Media provide an environment for students to produce and display their work. The department also enables students to gain practical experience with local companies and industry bodies such as JAMES and the Music Producers Guild.
