= Hoe Valley School =

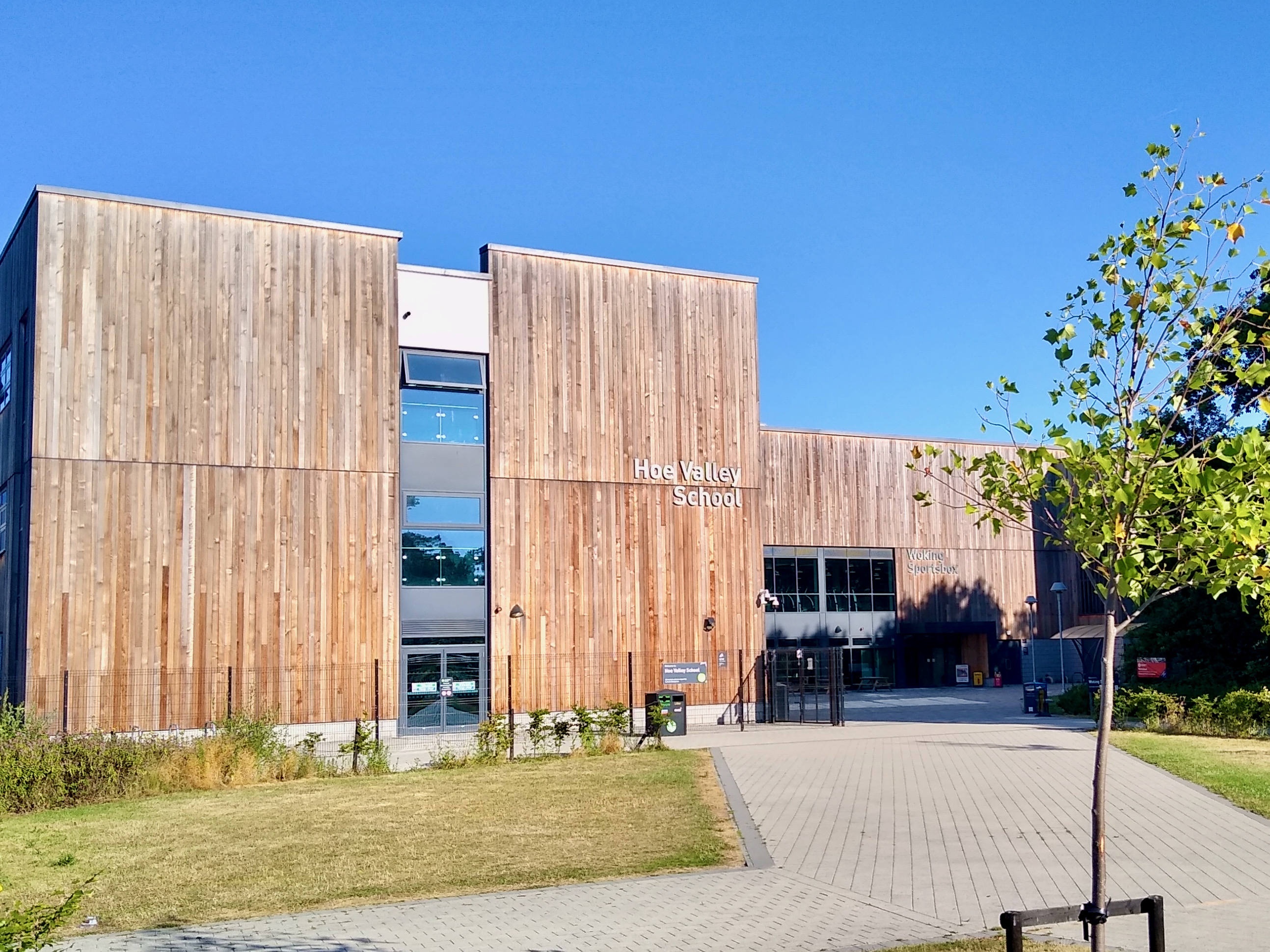

Location
- Egley Road; Woking, Surrey, GU22 0NH; England; 51.2992816°N 0.5731707°W

Information
- Type: Free school
- Established: 2014
- Local authority: Surrey County Council
- Department for Education URN: 142009 Tables
- Ofsted: Reports
- Head teacher: Kevin Kelly (interim)
- Gender: Mixed
- Age: 11 to 16
- Enrolment: 150 per year, 840 when full
- Colours: Emerald green and black
- Website: www.hoevalleyschool.org

Hoe Valley School is a new co-educational, comprehensive, secondary school in Woking, England. The school was established in 2014, and opened to 4 forms of year 7 students for the first time in September 2015. The school was established by local parents, education leaders and business people under the Free Schools programme primarily to serve the south Woking and surrounding area where students have not had access to places at other local schools.

== Establishment ==
In January 2014, the proposer group submitted an application to the Department for Education under the Free Schools programme for the establishment of a new secondary school to serve south Woking. Following a successful interview with the DfE in March, the proposal was approved to proceed to the 'pre-opening' phase in June 2014, in preparation for the school to open in September 2015.

== Ofsted and Governance ==
In June 2018, Hoe Valley School received its first Ofsted inspection and was rated outstanding overall

In May 2019, Lord Agnew, Parliamentary Under Secretary of State for the Schools System, presented Hoe Valley School with an award for Outstanding Governance in a Single School. The award was part of the National Governance Association's Outstanding Governance 2019 awards programme, and judges noted that they were impressed that the board has consistently shown excellent capability to strategically manage all aspects of the school, utilising its experience and enthusiasm to best effect.

== Admissions ==
Applications to Hoe Valley School are managed through the Surrey County Council coordinated admissions process taking place during September and October each year, available at the link below. Hoe Valley School has a Published Admission Number of 120 places per year group. In September 2018 and September 2019, the school admitted 150 students into year 7. The school does not operate a catchment area, and all admissions are prioritised based on nearest school and straight line distance. The school has been heavily over subscribed for the last 4 admissions years and as a result only pupils whose nearest school is Hoe Valley School have received an offer of a place.

== Sixth Form ==
In January 2019, Hoe Valley School announced that its sixth form would not open until September 2023, citing post-16 funding issues as the cause for the delay.

== Location ==
The school is in Egley Road, Woking, next door to Woking Sportsbox. The school makes use of the public car park at the site and can also hire the facilities of Woking Sportsbox for PE provision.
