= Rodborough School =

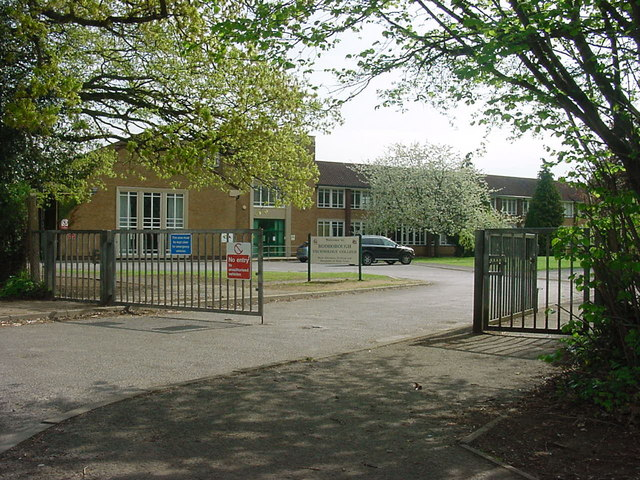

Location
- Rake Lane; Milford, Surrey, GU8 5BZ; England
- 51°09′47″N 0°38′53″W

Information
- Type: Academy
- Established: 27 November 1951
- Founder: A. Hamilton Cault, Brigadier (Canadian Army)
- Department for Education URN: 137019 Tables
- Ofsted: Reports
- Principal: Emma Hunston
- Gender: Coeducational
- Age: 11 to 16
- Houses: Webb, Wells and Owen
- Colours: Burgundy and Grey
- Publication: Chronicles
- Website: www.rodborough.surrey.sch.uk

Rodborough School is a coeducational secondary school with academy status, located in Milford, Surrey, England. The school is a feeder school for Godalming College.

== Awards and achievements ==
The school was identified as a Beacon school in 1998 and 2001 and the school's 2008 GCSE results showed 78% of pupils attained five or more top (A*-C) grades. The school was granted Technology College status in 2002 allowing more vocational GCSE courses to be available, such as Leisure and Tourism and Health & Social Care. The school was renamed Rodborough Technology College for a time, but this title has been dropped since the end of the Specialist schools programme.

== Ofsted recognition ==
In January 2007, Ofsted reported after an inspection, that the school was satisfactory. For the separate topics of inspection, the school received good and satisfactory grades. The report stated "Academic guidance is inconsistent and does not always give individuals enough information about how to improve their work and achieve higher standards." The school responded by adding an Attitude to Learning (ATL) grading system.

In an Ofsted Inspection that was carried out in December 2009, Rodborough was recognised as providing 'an outstanding education for its pupils', with attainment above average. This is an improvement on the previous grade and Ofsted also commented that the behaviour at the school was outstanding, with pupils having a good contribution to school and community life.

== Notable alumni ==
- Benjamin Hart, actor
- Rachel Hurd-Wood, actress
- Philip Johnston, co-founder and CEO of Starcloud
- Charlie Cosser, who was murdered in 2023, was the inspiration for the charity Charlie's Promise
