= Jubilee High School =

Coordinates: 51.3695°N 0.5040°W

Location
- School Lane; Addlestone, Surrey, KT15 1TE; England

Information
- Type: Academy
- Motto: Committed to excellence.
- Established: September 2002
- Local authority: Surrey County Council
- Department for Education URN: 139948 Tables
- Ofsted: Reports
- Chair of Governors: John Balchin
- Head of School: Mark Conroy
- Executive Headteacher: Stephen Price
- Staff: >100
- Gender: Coeducational
- Age: 11 to 16
- Enrolment: 800
- Colours: Maroon and teal
- Website: www.jubileehigh.surrey.sch.uk

Jubilee High School is a coeducational secondary school with academy status, located in Addlestone, Surrey, England. The school holds Artsmark Gold Award and International School status.

== History ==
The school was formed in September 1985 by the merger of St Paul's County Secondary School, Addlestone and The Meads County Secondary School, Chertsey, on the St Paul's site. Stepgates County Secondary School, Chertsey, had merged with The Meads in 1964.

Originally the school was called Abbeylands School. The Foundation Trustees own a large site that goes back to ownership by Chertsey Abbey.

Standards declined, until by 2000 Abbeylands was the lowest performing Surrey state secondary school in the published league tables. In September 2000 the school had only 541 pupils on roll against a capacity of 800; the school estimated that it needed 750 pupils on roll to achieve sufficient financial viability to erode a substantial deficit (about £160,000). Options for the future of the school, including closure, federation with another school and regeneration, were considered by the LEA, Surrey County Council.

Abbeylands was identified as a Fresh Start school and closed, to reopen renamed Jubilee High in September 2002.

Jubilee High was established as a Foundation School supported by a Trust (Note: Jubilee High Foundation (Company No. 0452193) was formed on 29 August 2002 and subsequently dissolved on 11 May 2010, according to Companies House WebCheck.) in partnership with Nord Anglia Education plc, in what was at the time a radical plan for private sector involvement in state education. Nord Anglia won the seven-year contract to help run the school in a competition reportedly shortlisted against Vosper Thorneycroft, (Note: Vosper Thorneycroft, renamed VT Group, subsequently operated a £100 million seven-year contract from 2004 to provide services to support education in Surrey, delivered through its joint venture with Surrey County Council, VT Four S, and extended from 2011. VT Four S was renamed Babcock Four S after the acquisition of VT Group by Babcock International Group completed 8 July 2010.) following its previous work with Abbeylands, which had been the first school management contract awarded to a profit making company. The Department for Education and Skills awarded £2.5 million of start-up funding following a joint submission by Nord Anglia and Surrey County Council.

Educational performance of the school remained below average for several more years. In its inspection in March 2005, the school was judged by Ofsted inspectors to provide an acceptable education, with achievement and quality of teaching judged satisfactory overall. However it was found to have 'serious weaknesses' in the teaching of English, and in children's attitude and behaviour. There was a very high turnover of staff. During the two years following its opening, two deputy principals left. One third of the teaching staff resigned in the summer of 2004. In July 2004, the principal left at very short notice. The school had five principals in as many years.

Gareth Balch took up post as principal in September 2005.

The proportion of pupils gaining five or more A* to C GCSE passes including English and mathematics rose from 14% in 2006; to 22% in 2007; 35% in 2008 and 44% in 2009. Jubilee High was recognised as a rapidly improving school: in March 2009 it was the 12th most improved school in England for GCSE results including English and mathematics.

The results for 2011 show that 46% of pupils gained five or more A* to C GCSEs (or equivalent) including English and mathematics. 80% of pupils achieved five or more A* to C grade GCSEs (or equivalent) and 91% achieved five or more A* to G grades. 98% of pupils achieved at least one qualification. Nevertheless, it remains near the bottom of the results league table for Surrey schools.

In April 2012, Gareth Balch stood down as principal following an unfavourable Ofsted inspector’s report. The school was given notice to improve, needing to raise achievement, especially in mathematics.

In January 2012, the Prince’s Teaching Institute awarded a PTI Mark to the History department at Jubilee High.

In January 2013 Stephen Price took over the role as Headmaster.

In the Ofsted inspection in July 2013 the quality of teaching, behaviour of pupils and the leadership and management were all rated as good whereas the achievement of pupils and the overall report were rated as requiring improvement.

In 2013 the school had the best results in its 28 years with 96% of its students gaining five or more GCSEs at grade C or above and 60% of its students gaining five or more GCSEs including English and Mathematics at C or above.

As of September 2013 the school achieved academy status. It is now part of the Bourne Education Trust, a Surrey-based multi-academy trust that includes Epsom and Ewell High School and Matthew Arnold School.

== International links ==
In January 2007 Jubilee High gained full International status just six months after application, and this achievement was celebrated by the British Council at an awards ceremony. The school has been awarded Advanced International School Status for 2010 to 2013 by the British Council.

The school has created links with other schools internationally: Elde College in Schijndel, The Netherlands; St Jadwiga the Queen Gymnasium in Luborzyca, Poland; Lilongwe Community School, Malawi; and Jubilee International School, Amman, Jordan.

Through its links with the Little Flower School, KwaZulu-Natal, South Africa, Jubilee High came into contact with the African Children's Choir. During a visit in 2006, Jubilee hosted the African Children's Choir, who performed at Jubilee High and in Assemblies, having a major influence on the motivation and belief in education of the British teenagers. The choir returned twice and a new choir visited in May and July 2008. A former member and Choir teacher has been given a training place at Jubilee in ICT. The choir has appeared on BBC News and has performed for Simon Cowell, reportedly bringing tears to his eyes.

Further opportunities are provided for students to visit other countries. Recent destinations have included China, Kenya, South Africa, Italy, United States and France.

== Arts ==
A new Learning Resource Centre and Performing Arts Centre were opened in 2007, featuring a state-of-the-art theatre with a seating capacity of 230. The horseshoe-shaped theatre incorporates a sprung timber floor surrounded on three sides by a two-tiered seating moat, allowing the theatre to be used as a theatre-in-the-round. A series of overhead walkways provide access to the stage lighting and are designed for use as a teaching aid, providing pupils with the opportunity to gain first-hand experience of the technical aspects of a production. The school runs theatre arts courses and the theatre is used by other schools and the Open University.

Performances by the school have included My Fair Lady, Our Town, Seven Brides for Seven Brothers and Guys and Dolls (2009). In 2011 the school performed Grease.

In June 2009, Jubilee was awarded Artsmark Gold, the top award, on its first attempt.

Jubilee High has been awarded Specialist College status for Performing Arts and ICT, meaning that new funds will be gradually made available to develop the Arts and ICT, both at school and in the community. Its business partners include: Royal Caribbean Cruise Line; Thorpe Park; Beacon Church; a Chertsey-based Architectural company; The Diocese of Guildford, and local people. The school plans to use additional capital funds to create a community radio station and recording studio.

In 2013 the school performed the musical South Pacific.

== Notable alumni ==
- Mark Stephens CBE, lawyer and broadcaster (St Paul's)
