= Warlingham School =

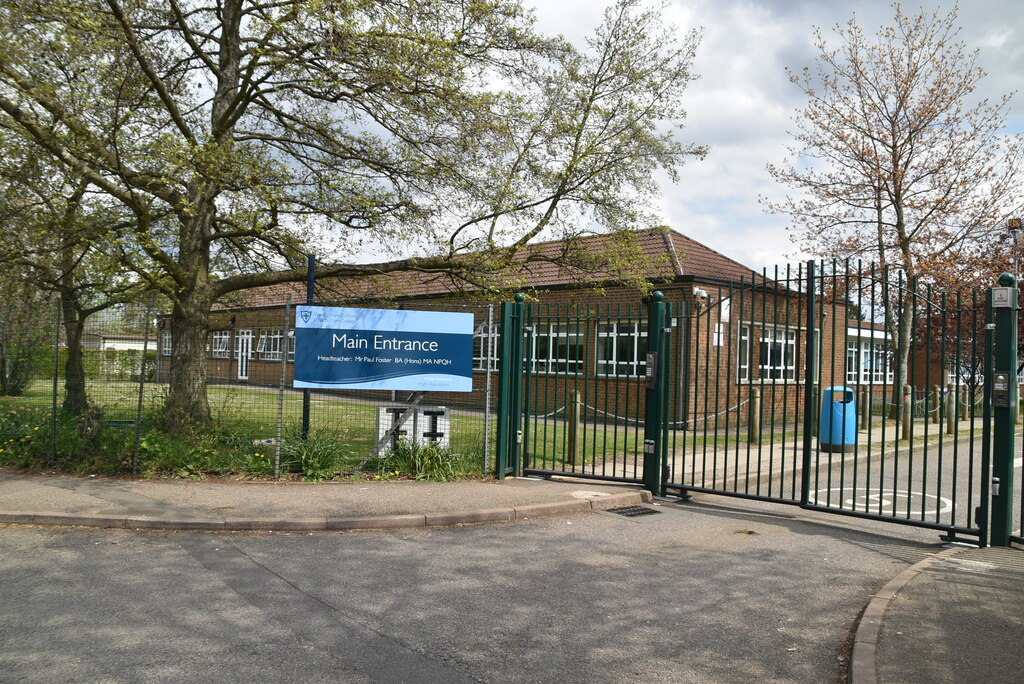

Location
- Tithepit Shaw Lane; Warlingham, Surrey, CR6 9YB; England; 51.317°N 0.069°W

Information
- Type: Academy
- Established: 1953; 73 years ago
- Local authority: Surrey
- Trust: Tandridge Learning Trust (TLT)
- Specialist: Business & Enterprise College
- Department for Education URN: 138928 Tables
- Ofsted: Reports
- Head teacher: Mr Paul Foster
- Gender: Co-educational
- Age: 11 to 18
- Houses: Johnson; Chichester; Sharman; Mallory
- Colours: Dark blue and White
- Publication: Bi-termly news publication
- Number on roll: 1408
- Website: warlinghamschool.co.uk

Warlingham School is a large secondary school with pupils aged 11–16, and also has a sixth form for 16- to 18-year-olds. The school is located in the village of Warlingham, in Surrey, England. It is one of three secondary schools in the district of Tandridge.

== History ==
In 1951 a new county secondary school build was announced that would take 600 pupils, located in Warlingham. The secondary modern school was opened in phases and completed in 1953. In September 1972 it became a comprehensive school, with the end of selection in Surrey schools. In 2012 it converted to academy status. In May 2017, the Tandridge Learning Trust (TLT) was formed, partnering Warlingham with Hamsey Green Primary School, Woodlea Primary School, Tatsfield Primary School and Bletchingley Primary School.

== Facilities ==
The facilities include a sports hall, swimming pool, astroturf, cricket pitches, rugby pitches, a gymnasium and a fitness suite.

== Notable teachers ==
- Edward Britton - first headmaster.

== Notable former pupils ==
- Amber-Keegan Stobbs - Professional footballer
- Simon King - Cricketer

== Bibliography ==
- "Warlingham Secondary School for 600 in New Building Scheme". Caterham Mirror. 13 July 1951.
- "Simon King Profile - Cricket Player England". ESPNcricinfo.
- "Warlingham School". gov.uk. Gov.UK. n.d.
- "Amber Stobbs - Women's Soccer". Hofstra University Athletics.
- School report - Warlingham school, Ofsted, 4 July 2013
- "Selection to end, Surrey Schools, 1972". Surrey Advertiser and County Times. 4 February 1972.
- "New Schools". Surrey Mirror and County Post. 19 September 1952.
- "Tandridge Learning Trust". tandridgelearningtrust.co.uk.
- Burgess, Tyrrell (7 January 2005). "Sir Edward Britton". The Guardian.
- "Warlingham School - Facilities". warlinghamtlt.co.uk.
