= The Hawthorns School =

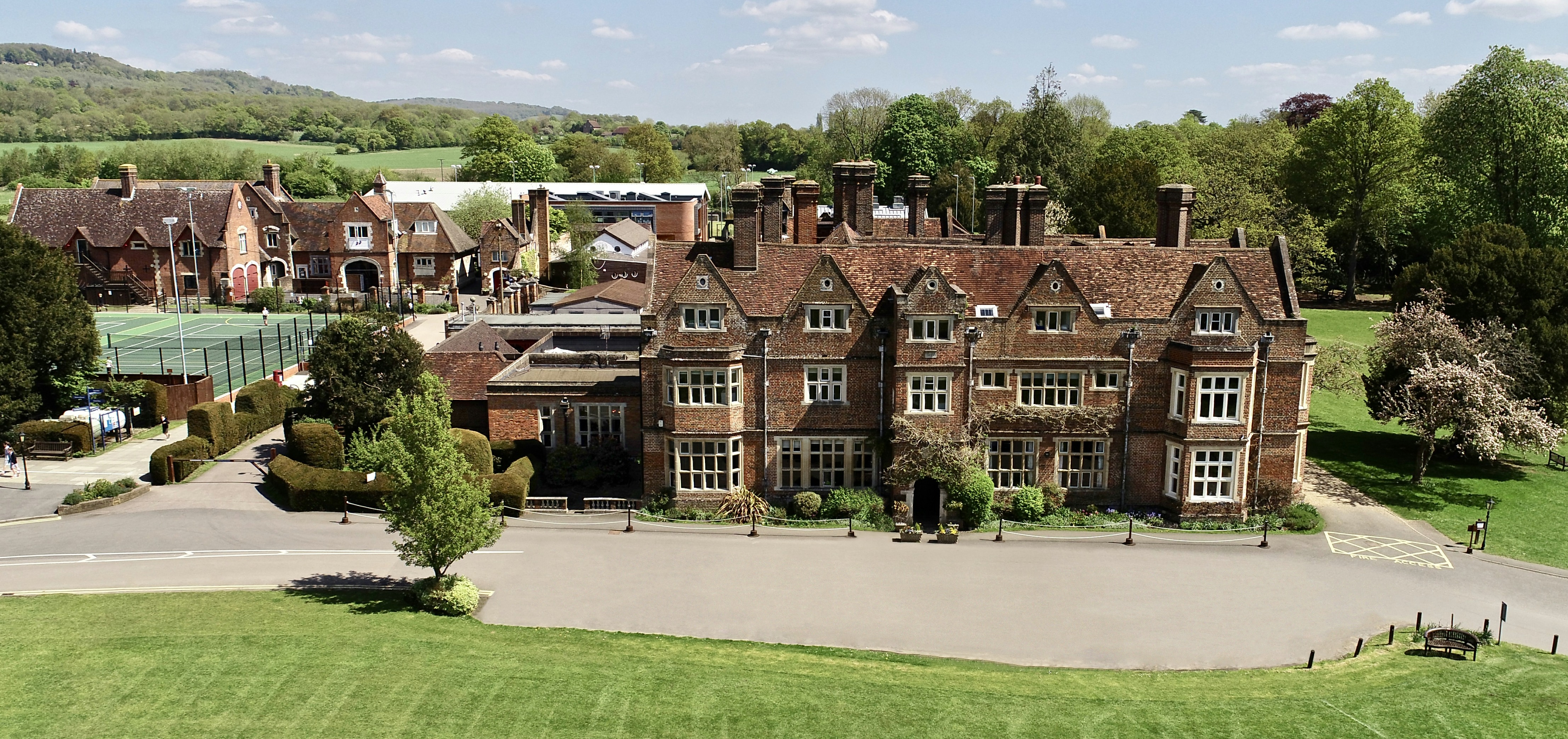
- The Hawthorns School

Location
- Pendell Court; Bletchingley, Surrey, RH1 4QJ; England; 51°15′4.5″N 0°6′48.2″W

Information
- Type: Independent day school
- Established: 1926; 100 years ago
- Founder: Dudley A Bull
- Headmaster: Adrian Floyd
- Staff: 120 (2021)
- Gender: mixed
- Age range: 0-13
- Enrolment: 520
- Campus size: 35 acres
- Yearbook: The Hawthorns Review
- Affiliation: Independent Association of Prep Schools Caterham School
- Website: www.hawthorns.com

The Hawthorns School is an independent nursery and preparatory school for boys and girls aged 6 months to 13 years in Bletchingley, Surrey, England. It is a member of the Caterham Family of Schools, affiliated with the public school of Caterham.

The headmaster as of 2015 is Mr Adrian Floyd.

== Site ==
Situated in a semi-rural location near Redhill, Reigate, Oxted, Caterham, Westerham and Lingfield, the 35-acre site includes the listed Pendell Court alongside facilities for nursery and pre-prep children, as well as subject specialist centres.

== History ==
Founded in 1926 by Mr Dudley A Bull, the school began as a boys' preparatory school with both day pupils and boarders. 'The Hawthorns' house, built in the 1880s, was situated at Gatton Point, on the London Brighton road, north of Redhill. In 1961 the school moved to Pendell Court, Bletchingley. Built in 1624 as a family home, it was later occupied by an order of nuns, the Wantage Sisters, until 1960.

The school became a co-educational prep school in September 1992. Boarding ended and The Hawthorns became an IAPS day school in 1994.

In December 2024, the school joined Copthorne Prep and Caterham Prep the 'Caterham Family of Schools' which Caterham School had established in 2023. Hawthorns maintains its own independent management whilst benefitting from an established connection to facilitate the admission process to Caterham. The group also aims to collaborate on developing digital learning in their curriculums.

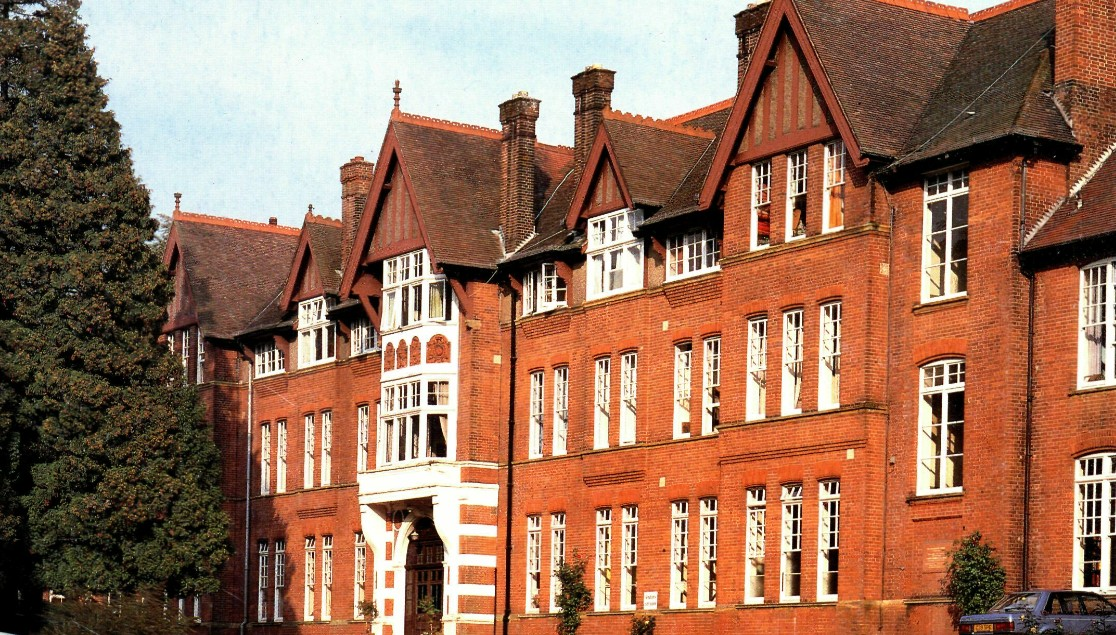
Caterham

== Notable Old Hawthornians ==
- Newton Faulkner
- Lord Bingham
- Adrian Greenwood, historian
- Jason Roy, cricketer
