= Woolmer Hill School =

Location
- Woolmer Hill; Haslemere, Surrey, GU27 1QB; England; 51.0932°N 0.7494°W

Information
- Type: Academy
- Established: 1956
- Specialist: Technology College
- Department for Education URN: 137314 Tables
- Ofsted: Reports
- Chair of Governors: Susan Stathers
- Headteacher: Clare Talbot
- Staff: 1/2 teachers, 0 assistant teachers
- Gender: Co-educational
- Age: 11 to 16
- Enrolment: 1000
- Colours: Navy (main), red (complementary), pale blue (school tie only)
- Converted to Academy: August 2011
- Type of Academy: Standalone, single site.
- Website: www.woolmerhill.surrey.sch.uk

Woolmer Hill School, formerly Woolmer Hill Technology College, is the main secondary school in the area of Haslemere, Surrey.

== Funding ==
A non-fee paying school, WHS's funding is received predominantly via pro rata Education Funding Agency annual allocation from general taxation. Since 1989 the school has benefited from the Woolmer Hill School Friends Association, a Charities Commission registered fund raised by parents and fundraising across the region. Funds are enhanced by successful registration or selection for pupil premiums and grants restricted to central and local government-funded schools. Free school meals eligibility: 5.6% (band: low). The proportion of students known to be eligible for the pupil premium funding (additional government funding for children in the care of the local authority, students known to be eligible for free school meals and those from service families) stood for the financial year 2014–15 at £89,760 to supplement annual central government funding of more than £3,000,000.

== Attributes ==
Relatively, Woolmer Hill School is approximately smaller of the size of the average secondary education-specialising academy. The proportion of disabled students and those who have special educational needs is above average. The proportion who are eligible for support from the pupil premium (additional government funding) is below average. A very small minority of students have English as an additional language. The academy has partnerships with several providers of alternative education such as Godalming College, Guildford College, M.I.T., West Byfleet, The Wey Centre, Haslemere, and Merrist Wood. The headteacher is actively involved in the leadership of the Waverley schools federation. The school's leadership has additional autonomy by virtue of academy status since 17 August 2011. The tutor forms provide a pastoral, advice point across all activities.

=== Facilities ===
The main facilities include total grounds including buildings of 25 acres (10 ha) and The Edge sports centre with its large multi-purpose sports’ hall and two flood-lit all-weather pitches. The school has its own gym too.

== Ofsted ==
The Ofsted inspection of December 2014 gave the school an overall Grade 2, Good, on the four-point scale One of the main Ofsted reporters on site called Paul Goodwin said it was "a very exciting place to work and learn”
