= Runnymede and Weybridge =

UK Parliament constituency (since 1997)

Coordinates: 51.36°N 0.45°W

- County constituency for the House of Commons
- Boundaries since 2024
- Boundary of Runnymede and Weybridge in South East England
- County: Surrey
- Electorate: 73,778 (2023)
- Major settlements: Addlestone; Cobham; Chertsey; Egham; Weybridge

Current constituency
- Created: 1997
- Member of Parliament: Ben Spencer (Conservative)
- Seats: One
- Created from: Chertsey and Walton (majority); North West Surrey (minority)

Runnymede and Weybridge is a constituency (Note: A county constituency (for the purposes of election expenses and type of returning officer)) in Surrey represented in the House of Commons of the UK Parliament since 2019 by Ben Spencer, a Conservative. (Note: As with all constituencies, the constituency elects one Member of Parliament (MP) by the first past the post system of election at least every five years.)

The constituency was created for the 1997 general election and represented from then until 2019 by Philip Hammond, who served as Foreign Secretary from 2014 to 2016 and Chancellor of the Exchequer from 2016 to 2019. Hammond sat as a Conservative before becoming an independent backbencher for the last two months of his final term.

== Constituency profile ==
River Wey, Weybridge

Runnymede and Weybridge is a constituency in Surrey in South East England. It is named after the Borough of Runnymede (and hence ultimately after a local water-meadow) and the town of Weybridge. Other settlements include the towns of Egham, Chertsey and Addlestone and the villages of Egham Hythe, Ottershaw, New Haw, Woodham, Cobham and Oxshott.

This constituency covers suburban towns and villages that form part of London's commuter belt, located around 17 miles (27 km) south-west of the centre of the capital. This area is highly affluent, containing numerous golf courses and some of the country's most expensive properties, particularly in neighbourhoods like St George's Hill. The constituency's average house price is more than double the UK average. Chertsey is one of the country's oldest market towns, and the constituency also contains Thorpe Park, one of the UK's most visited theme parks.

Residents of Runnymede and Weybridge have a similar age profile to the rest of the country, albeit with an above-average proportion of middle-aged adults. They have high levels of income and homeownership and the child poverty rate is less than half the UK-wide rate. Residents are generally well-educated and a high proportion work in the business administration, science and arts sectors. The percentage claiming unemployment benefits is low. White people made up 85% of the population at the 2021 census.

Most of the constituency is represented by Conservatives at the local council level, with some Liberal Democrats elected in Weybridge and some Reform UK councillors elected in Addlestone. An estimated 51% of voters in Runnymede and Weybridge supported leaving the European Union in the 2016 referendum, similar to the UK-wide figure of 52%.

== Boundaries ==
Map of 2010–2024 boundaries

=== Current ===
Due to the 2023 periodic review shaping elections, from 2024, the ward components are (as they existed on 1 December 2020):

- The Borough of Elmbridge: wards of: Cobham & Downside; Oxshott & Stoke D'Abernon; Weybridge Riverside; Weybridge St. George's Hill. In East Surrey, from April 2027.
- The Borough of Runnymede most wards: Addlestone North; Addlestone South; Chertsey Riverside; Chertsey St. Ann's; Egham Hythe; Egham Town; Longcross, Lyne and Chertsey South; New Haw; Ottershaw; Thorpe; Woodham and Rowtown In West Surrey, from April 2027.

The mainly low-density places of Englefield Green and Virginia Water abutting Windsor Great Park were transferred to the Berkshire seat of Windsor. To compensate this and accurately a higher-than-UK-average rise in housing and population, two similar southern wards that were in Esher and Walton listed foremost were gained as the similar "village" (as a standard ward) of Oatlands went across in the opposite way. Components remain all in north Surrey and have the same core towns.

=== 1997–2024 ===
- In the Borough of Elmbridge: Oatlands and Burwood Park; Weybridge Riverside; Weybridge St George's Hill
- The Borough of Runnymede: all wards (Addlestone North; Addlestone South; Chertsey Riverside; Chertsey St Ann's; Egham Hythe; Egham Town; Englefield Green East; Englefield Green West; Longcross, Lyne & Chertsey South; New Haw; Ottershaw; Thorpe; Virginia Water; Woodham & Rowtown )

== History ==
The constituency was created in 1997 from parts of the former constituencies of Chertsey and Walton and North West Surrey.

From its creation until 2019, it was represented by Philip Hammond, of the Conservative Party, who served as a Cabinet Minister throughout the Cameron–Clegg coalition before holding in succession two of the Great Offices of State: Foreign Secretary from 2014 to 2016, and Chancellor of the Exchequer from 2016 to 2019.

Runnymede and Weybridge is a Conservative safe seat based on both length of tenure and size of majorities – the narrowest margin of victory was in the 2024 general election, of 15.8% of the vote.

== Members of Parliament ==
Chertsey and Walton prior to 1997

| Election | Member | Party |
|---|---|---|
| 1997 | Philip Hammond | Conservative |
| September 2019 | Philip Hammond | Independent |
| 2019 | Ben Spencer | Conservative |

== Elections ==
=== Elections in the 2020s ===
General election 2024: Runnymede and Weybridge
| Party | Candidate | Votes | % | ±% |
|---|---|---|---|---|
| Conservative | Ben Spencer | 18,442 | 38.2 | −15.0 |
| Liberal Democrats | Ellen Nicholson | 10,815 | 22.4 | −0.3 |
| Labour | Robert King | 9,963 | 20.6 | +2.9 |
| Reform | Stewart Mackay | 6,419 | 13.3 | New |
| Green | Steve Ringham | 1,954 | 4.0 | +1.3 |
| Independent | Michael Cressey | 518 | 1.1 | New |
| UKIP | Nicholas Wood | 142 | 0.3 | −0.6 |
| Majority | | 7,627 | 15.8 | −18.5 |
| Turnout | | 48,253 | 65.6 | −5.8 |
| Registered electors | | 73,610 | | |
| Conservative hold | | Swing | −7.4 | |

=== Elections in the 2010s ===
2019 notional result
| Party | Vote | % |
|---|---|---|
| Conservative | 28,028 | 53.2 |
| Liberal Democrats | 11,956 | 22.7 |
| Labour | 9,347 | 17.7 |
| Others | 1,923 | 3.7 |
| Green | 1,415 | 2.7 |
| Turnout | 52,669 | 71.4 |
| Electorate | 73,778 | |

General election 2019: Runnymede and Weybridge
| Party | Candidate | Votes | % | ±% |
|---|---|---|---|---|
| Conservative | Ben Spencer | 29,262 | 54.9 | −6.0 |
| Labour | Robert King | 10,992 | 20.6 | −5.3 |
| Liberal Democrats | Rob O'Carroll | 9,236 | 17.3 | +10.0 |
| Green | Benjamin Smith | 1,876 | 3.5 | +0.9 |
| Independent | Stewart Mackay | 777 | 1.5 | New |
| Independent | Lorna Rowland | 670 | 1.3 | New |
| UKIP | Nicholas Wood | 476 | 0.9 | −2.4 |
| Majority | | 18,270 | 34.3 | −0.7 |
| Turnout | | 53,289 | 69.0 | +0.9 |
| Conservative hold | | Swing | −0.4 | |

General election 2017: Runnymede and Weybridge
| Party | Candidate | Votes | % | ±% |
|---|---|---|---|---|
| Conservative | Philip Hammond | 31,436 | 60.9 | +1.2 |
| Labour | Fiona Dent | 13,386 | 25.9 | +10.4 |
| Liberal Democrats | John Vincent | 3,765 | 7.3 | +0.6 |
| UKIP | Nicholas Wood | 1,675 | 3.3 | −10.6 |
| Green | Lee-Anne Lawrance | 1,347 | 2.6 | −1.5 |
| Majority | | 18,050 | 35.0 | −9.2 |
| Turnout | | 51,609 | 68.1 | 0.0 |
| Conservative hold | | Swing | −4.6 | |

General election 2015: Runnymede and Weybridge
| Party | Candidate | Votes | % | ±% |
|---|---|---|---|---|
| Conservative | Philip Hammond | 29,901 | 59.7 | +3.8 |
| Labour | Arran Neathey | 7,767 | 15.5 | +2.1 |
| UKIP | Joe Branco | 6,951 | 13.9 | +7.4 |
| Liberal Democrats | John Vincent | 3,362 | 6.7 | −14.9 |
| Green | Rustam Majainah | 2,071 | 4.1 | +2.7 |
| Majority | | 22,134 | 44.2 | +7.9 |
| Turnout | | 50,224 | 68.1 | +1.7 |
| Conservative hold | | Swing | +0.8 | |

General election 2010: Runnymede and Weybridge
| Party | Candidate | Votes | % | ±% |
|---|---|---|---|---|
| Conservative | Philip Hammond | 26,915 | 55.9 | +4.5 |
| Liberal Democrats | Andrew Falconer | 10,406 | 21.6 | +3.7 |
| Labour | Paul Greenwood | 6,446 | 13.4 | −9.6 |
| UKIP | Toby Micklethwait | 3,146 | 6.5 | +2.6 |
| Green | Jenny Gould | 696 | 1.4 | −1.3 |
| Independent | David Sammons | 541 | 1.1 | +1.1 |
| Majority | | 16,509 | 34.3 | +5.9 |
| Turnout | | 48,292 | 66.5 | +7.8 |
| Conservative hold | | Swing | +0.4 | |

=== Elections in the 2000s ===
General election 2005: Runnymede and Weybridge
| Party | Candidate | Votes | % | ±% |
|---|---|---|---|---|
| Conservative | Philip Hammond | 22,366 | 51.4 | +2.7 |
| Labour | Paul Greenwood | 10,017 | 23.0 | −6.0 |
| Liberal Democrats | Henry Bolton | 7,771 | 17.9 | +1.6 |
| UKIP | Anthony Micklethwait | 1,719 | 3.9 | +0.8 |
| Green | Charles Gilman | 1,180 | 2.7 | −0.2 |
| Monster Raving Loony | Andrew Collett | 358 | 0.8 | New |
| UK Community Issues Party | Katrina Osman | 113 | 0.3 | New |
| Majority | | 12,349 | 28.4 | +8.7 |
| Turnout | | 43,524 | 58.7 | +2.6 |
| Conservative hold | | Swing | +4.4 | |

- Result declared at 02:19

General election 2001: Runnymede and Weybridge
| Party | Candidate | Votes | % | ±% |
|---|---|---|---|---|
| Conservative | Philip Hammond | 20,646 | 48.7 | +0.1 |
| Labour | Jane Briginshaw | 12,286 | 29.0 | −0.4 |
| Liberal Democrats | Chris Bushill | 6,924 | 16.3 | 0.0 |
| UKIP | Christopher Browne | 1,332 | 3.1 | +1.9 |
| Green | Charles Gilman | 1,238 | 2.9 | New |
| Majority | | 8,360 | 19.7 | +0.5 |
| Turnout | | 42,426 | 56.1 | −15.4 |
| Conservative hold | | Swing | +0.3 | |

- Result declared at 03:21

=== Elections in the 1990s ===
General election 1997: Runnymede and Weybridge
| Party | Candidate | Votes | % | ±% |
|---|---|---|---|---|
| Conservative | Philip Hammond | 25,051 | 48.6 | −12.8 |
| Labour | Ian Peacock | 15,176 | 29.4 | +13.5 |
| Liberal Democrats | Geoffrey Taylor | 8,397 | 16.3 | −4.8 |
| Referendum | Peter Rolt | 2,150 | 4.2 | New |
| UKIP | Simon Slater | 625 | 1.2 | New |
| Natural Law | Jeremy Sleeman | 162 | 0.3 | New |
| Majority | | 9,875 | 19.2 | |
| Turnout | | 51,561 | 71.5 | −9.03 |
| Conservative hold | | Swing | -13.1 | |

- Result declared at 03:31

== See also ==
- List of parliamentary constituencies in Surrey
- List of parliamentary constituencies in the South East England (region)

== Sources ==
- Election result, 2015 (BBC)
- Election result, 2010 (BBC)
- Election result, 2005 (BBC)
- Election results, 1997 – 2001 (BBC)
- Election results, 1997 – 2001 (Election Demon)

Parliament of the United Kingdom
| Preceded by Tatton | Constituency represented by the chancellor of the Exchequer; 2016–2019 | Succeeded by Bromsgrove |
