= St John the Baptist School, Woking =

St John the Baptist Comprehensive School

Location
- Elmbridge Lane; Kingfield, Surrey, GU22 9AL; England; 51°18′30″N 0°32′57″W

Information
- Type: Academy
- Motto: Have faith, believe you can!
- Religious affiliation: Christianity (Catholic)
- Established: 1969
- Local authority: Surrey County Council
- Trust: Xavier Catholic Education Trust
- Department for Education URN: 143369 Tables
- Ofsted: Reports
- Headteacher: James Granville-Hamshar
- Gender: Coeducational
- Age: 11 to 18
- Enrolment: 1375
- Website: w.sjb.school

St John the Baptist School is a coeducational Catholic secondary school and sixth form in Woking, Surrey, England. The school was one of the first 100 designated teaching schools in the UK.

== Location ==
The school serves primarily the Catholic community of the Woking Deanery, which comprises the parishes of Woking with Send, Camberley, Camberley North with Bagshot, Frimley, Knaphill and West Byfleet. The deanery primary schools located in that community which are the feeder schools for St John the Baptist School are: St Dunstan’s Primary School, Woking; St Augustine’s Primary School, St Mary's Byfleet, Camberley; St Hugh of Lincoln Catholic Primary School, Knaphill and The Marist Primary School, West Byfleet.

== National teaching school ==
SJB was designated a teaching school in July 2011. There are currently ten members of staff seconded to other schools and under the leadership of Ani Magill, 16 senior leaders have become head teachers.

As a national teaching School they offer training and support to:

- Play a greater role in training new entrants to the profession
- Lead peer-to-peer professional and leadership development
- Identify and develop leadership potential
- Provide support for other schools
- Designate and broker Specialist Leaders of Education (SLEs)
- Engage in research and development

In conjunction with The Surrey Teaching Schools Network, SJB has been successful in securing the licence for leadership provision of the National College for School Leadership's programmes. As a teaching school, St John the Baptist School is responsible for the NPQH.

== Academy ==
Previously a voluntary aided school administered by the Surrey County Council, St. John the Baptist School converted to academy status in September 2016. The school is now sponsored by the Xavier Catholic Education Trust.

== Academics ==
In 2022/23, overall pupil absence at the school was 6.4%. This compares to 8% in the Surrey local authority, and 9% in England.

In 2010, the A Level results were 100% pass with 71% at A*-B.

== Notable former pupils ==
- Claire Darke MBE, 161st Mayor of Wolverhampton
- Sean Lock, English comedian
- Ali-A, British content creator
- Christian Manz, Oscar and BAFTA nominated visual effects artist
