= Ben Spencer (politician) =

British politician (born 1981)

Ben Spencer MP
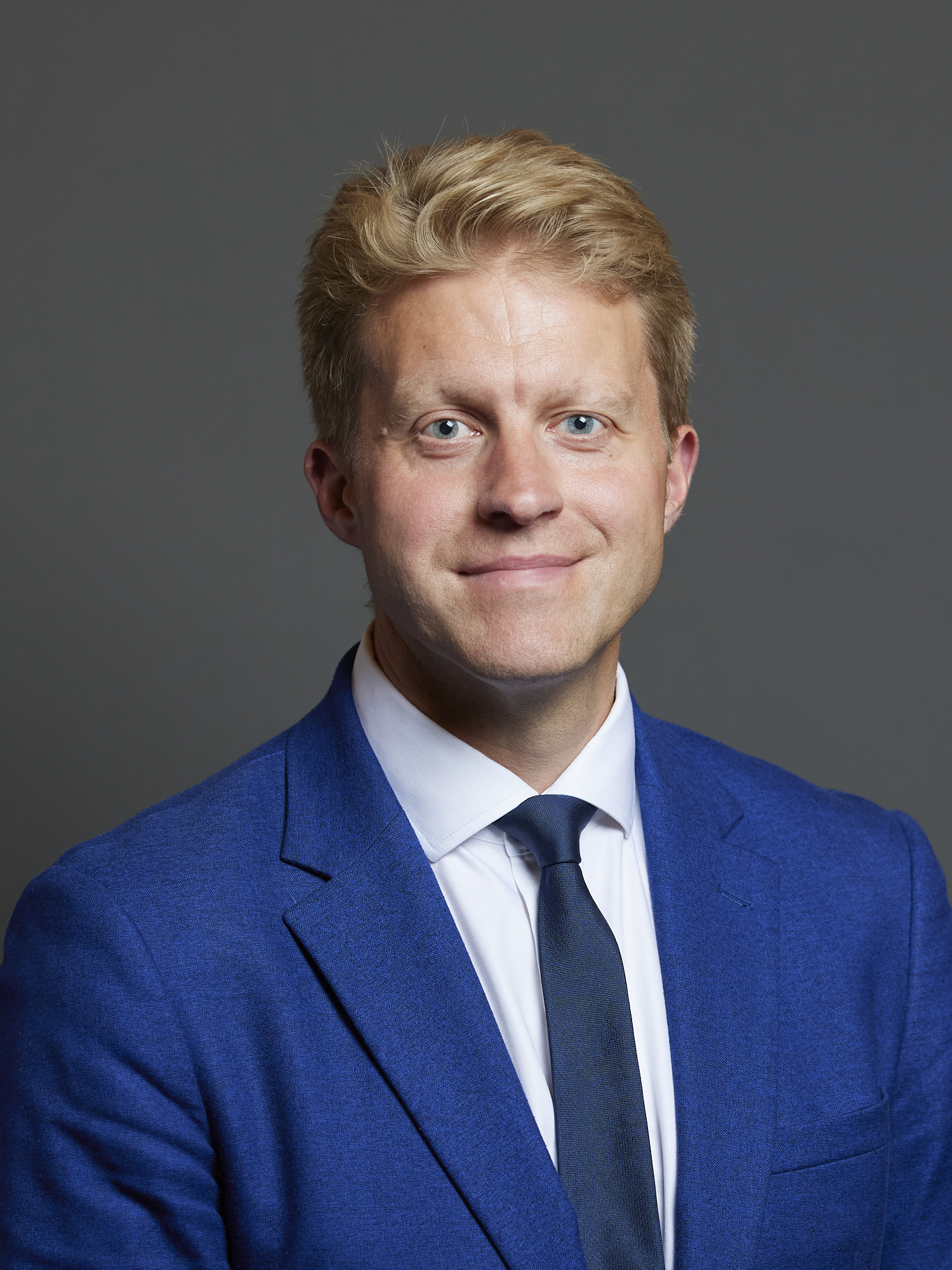
- Official portrait, 2024

Shadow Minister for AI (Note: Science, Innovation and Technology until August 2026)
- Incumbent
- Assumed office 6 November 2024
- Leader: Kemi Badenoch

Shadow Minister for Health and Social Care
- In office 19 July 2024 – 6 November 2024
- Leader: Rishi Sunak

Deputy Chairman of the Conservative Party
- In office 25 November 2023 – 5 July 2024
- Leader: Rishi Sunak

Member of Parliament for Runnymede and Weybridge
- Incumbent
- Assumed office 12 December 2019
- Preceded by: Philip Hammond
- Majority: 7,627 (15.8%)

Personal details
- Born: Benjamin Walter Jack Spencer; 11 December 1981 (age 44) Liverpool, England
- Party: Conservative
- Children: 2
- Website: Dr Ben Spencer official website

Benjamin Walter Jack Spencer (11 December 1981) is a British Conservative Party politician and former psychiatrist who has been the Member of Parliament for Runnymede and Weybridge since 2019.

== Early life and career ==
Ben Spencer was born on 11 December 1981 in Liverpool. He attended a state grammar school in the West Midlands. He has a masters in mental health law and a PhD on decision-making capacity.

Spencer worked for ten years as a doctor for the NHS, specialising in mental health.

== Parliamentary career ==
At the snap 2017 general election, Ben Spencer stood in Camberwell and Peckham, coming second with 12.8% of the vote behind the incumbent Labour MP Harriet Harman.

Spencer was elected to Parliament at the 2019 general election as MP for Runnymede and Weybridge with 54.9% of the vote and a majority of 18,270.

He was a member of the Work and Pensions Select Committee from March 2020 to May 2024.

On 3 October 2022, he was appointed Parliamentary Private Secretary to the Minister without Portfolio and Chairman of the Conservative Party Jake Berry. On 25 November 2023, he was appointed Deputy Chairman of the Conservative Party for Campaigning and Candidates – Disability and Diversity.

At the 2024 general election, Spencer was re-elected as MP for Runnymede and Weybridge with a greatly reduced majority of 7,627.

On 19 July 2024, he was appointed as Shadow Minister of State for Mental Health, Prevention and Public Health.

Following the election of Kemi Badenoch in the 2024 Conservative leadership election, Spencer was made Shadow Minister for Science, Innovation and Technology.

== Notes ==
Parliament of the United Kingdom
Preceded by Philip Hammond	Member of Parliament for Runnymede and Weybridge; 2019–present	Incumbent
