= Jean Robinson (advocate for the blind) =

British advocate for the blind (1896–1963)

- Robinson from a 1932 newspaper
- Born: 26 November 1896; Lewisham, England
- Died: 18 November 1963 (aged 66); West Byfleet, England
- Education: Somerville College, Oxford

Jean Robinson (26 November 1896 – 18 November 1963) was the first blind British woman to graduate from university. She was chair of the Middlesex Association for the Blind from 1952 to 1963 and edited braille magazines The Venture and Adventurers All for blind Boy Scouts and Girl Guides.

== Personal life and education ==
Robinson's parents were John Henry Robinson and Alice Mary Robinson, née Corder. She was born blind. She graduated with an MA from Somerville College, Oxford in 1921, the first blind British woman to graduate from university. While at Oxford she sang with the Oxford Bach Choir. After graduation she created a "minutely classified catalogue" of the new braille library collection at the Oxford Public Library.

=== Death ===
In her will, Robinson left a large proportion of her estate (£149,000, equivalent to £2.6 million in 2024) to the Middlesex Association for the Blind, with the wish that it be used to provide "improved accommodation for the growing number of elderly blind people." She left her body to medical science, requesting "if possible at St. Thomas' Hospital". After her death the Middlesex Association for the Blind Jean Robinson Bequest Fund was established and in lieu of flowers at her funeral she requested that donations be made to the Middlesex Association for the Blind.

== Career ==
After graduation, Robinson "threw considerable energy" into the work of the Mary Ward Settlement, an adult education college in Stratford, London. She joined the Ranger company there and established an orchestra.

In 1930s she served on the executive council of the National Institute for the Blind as well as the sub-committees responsible for homes, publications and placement. She joined the Middlesex Association for the Blind in 1928, serving as chair from 1952 until her death.

Robinson was also involved with the following organisations:

- League of Nations Union (West Byfleet branch), president
- Children's Country Holiday Fund (CCHF) St Pancras, member
- Lancing St School Care, committee member
- Social Service council, member
- Girl Guides Association, sub-committee member
- St Pancras Charity Organisation Society (COS) committee member
- Surrey Voluntary Association for the Blind
- Barclay Workshops for the Blind
- National Library for the Blind, executive committee member
- Essex County Association for the Blind
- Staffordshire Association for the Welfare of the Blind, committee member
- Incorporated Association for the Promoting the General Welfare of the Blind
- Women's Institute, Pyrford branch, founding member

== Girl Guides ==
Robinson started the 2nd Blind Post Company and was assistant secretary for Blind Companies which by 1930 included five Brownie packs, 17 Guide companies, seven Ranger companies and nine post-Ranger companies.

In 1930, together with W J Merridan, she co-edited The Venture, a monthly magazine in braille for blind Boy Scouts and Girl Guides, printed by the National Institute for the Blind. It ceased production during WWII when Robinson went on to create the monthly magazine Adventurers All. Due to the constraints of war she "printed the paper by squeezing the pages and stereo plates through her kitchen mangle."

In the 1930s, she "originated the idea of camps for blind Guides." It was pioneering work, and, with the support of a "willing band of sighted helpers she collected", was adjudged "a great success".

Robinson was awarded Medal of Merit from the GGA in 1952.
