= Fullbrook School =

Location
- Selsdon Road; New Haw, Surrey, KT15 3RL; England; 51.343663°N 0.506347°W

Information
- Type: Academy
- Motto: Inspired to achieve
- Established: 1st August 2011
- Local authority: Surrey
- Department for Education URN: 137003 Tables
- Ofsted: Reports
- Head teacher: Anna Wallis
- Staff: 269
- Gender: Mixed
- Age: 11 to 18
- Enrolment: 1,500
- Houses: Phoenix, Pegasus, Griffin and Dragon.
- Colours: Navy Blue, Light Blue, White
- Website: www.fullbrook.surrey.sch.uk

Fullbrook School is a secondary school and sixth form college in northwest Surrey, England. The school has held Specialist Science, Technology, Mathematics and Computing College status since 2002.

The school gained Grant Maintained status in September 1994 and was then given foundation status in 1999. In 2011, the school became an academy. Its main catchment areas are Byfleet, West Byfleet and New Haw with some pupils coming from Addlestone, Woking, Goldsworth Park and Sheerwater. The school has around 1550 students and there are about 250 students in the school's Sixth Form. In January 2017, Mrs A Turner retired as head of Fullbrook School, and was succeeded by Mrs K Moore. In 2022, Mr A McKenzie was appointed as head of the school, coinciding with his lead as principal at King's College, Guildford.

== History ==
Fullbrook was first established on its present site in 1954, when West Byfleet County Secondary School was divided into two as numbers at that school, due to postwar expansion, reached 747 in September 1953. Pupils living to the north of the line from Sheerwater Road, the Basingstoke Canal and then along the railway to West Weybridge (now Byfleet and New Haw) transferred to Fullbrook County Secondary School.

Above the main entrance is a stone plaque that was loaned to the school from the London County Council (LCC) during the building programme in the early 1950s. The Sheerwater Estate was being built to provide over spill housing for Londoners. The school there, now Bishop David Brown, had not yet been built and so the plaque came to the just completed Fullbrook School. The Headteacher and Governors used it to inspire the school badge. The plaque features an eagle and a squirrel. It was decided that as an eagle was often used on badges, to use choose the squirrel as it was different. The Festival of Britain was held at that time and celebrated contemporary design.

The original Fullbrook building is in a typical 1950s style. The plaque design is very much in the Art Deco style and it is possible that it came from a London building destroyed during The Blitz.

Mr W. H. Bean, the school's first headmaster, retired in 1968.

In 1976, West Byfleet County Secondary School closed and its pupils and teachers joined Fullbrook.

== Notable alumni ==
- Shoaib Bashir, cricketer, Somerset and England
- Laura Davies, professional golfer
- Steve Mac, record producer, songwriter and musician.
