= West Byfleet =

Village and parish in Surrey, England

Coordinates: 51.3380°N 0.5033°W

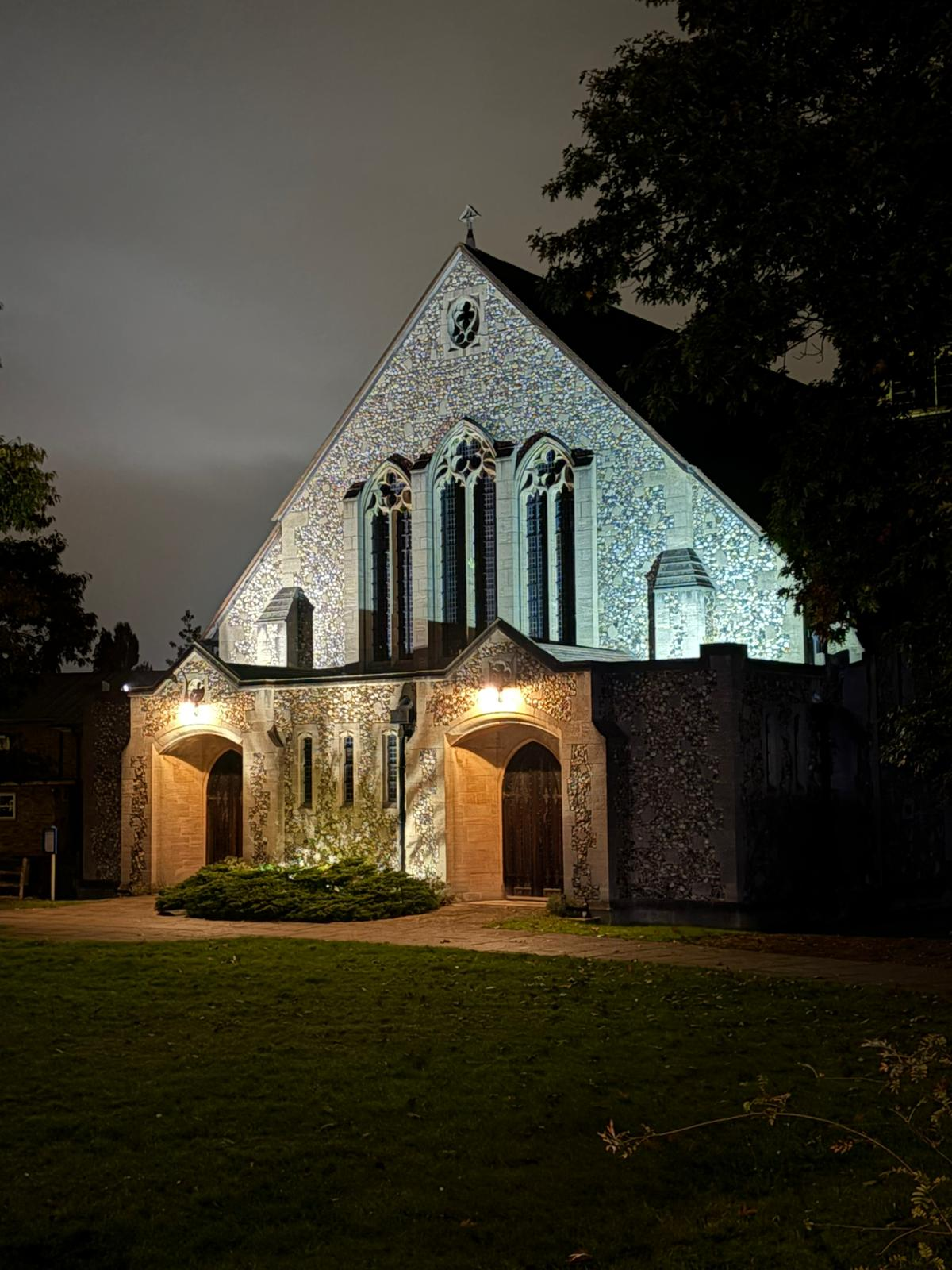
- St John's church, West Byfleet

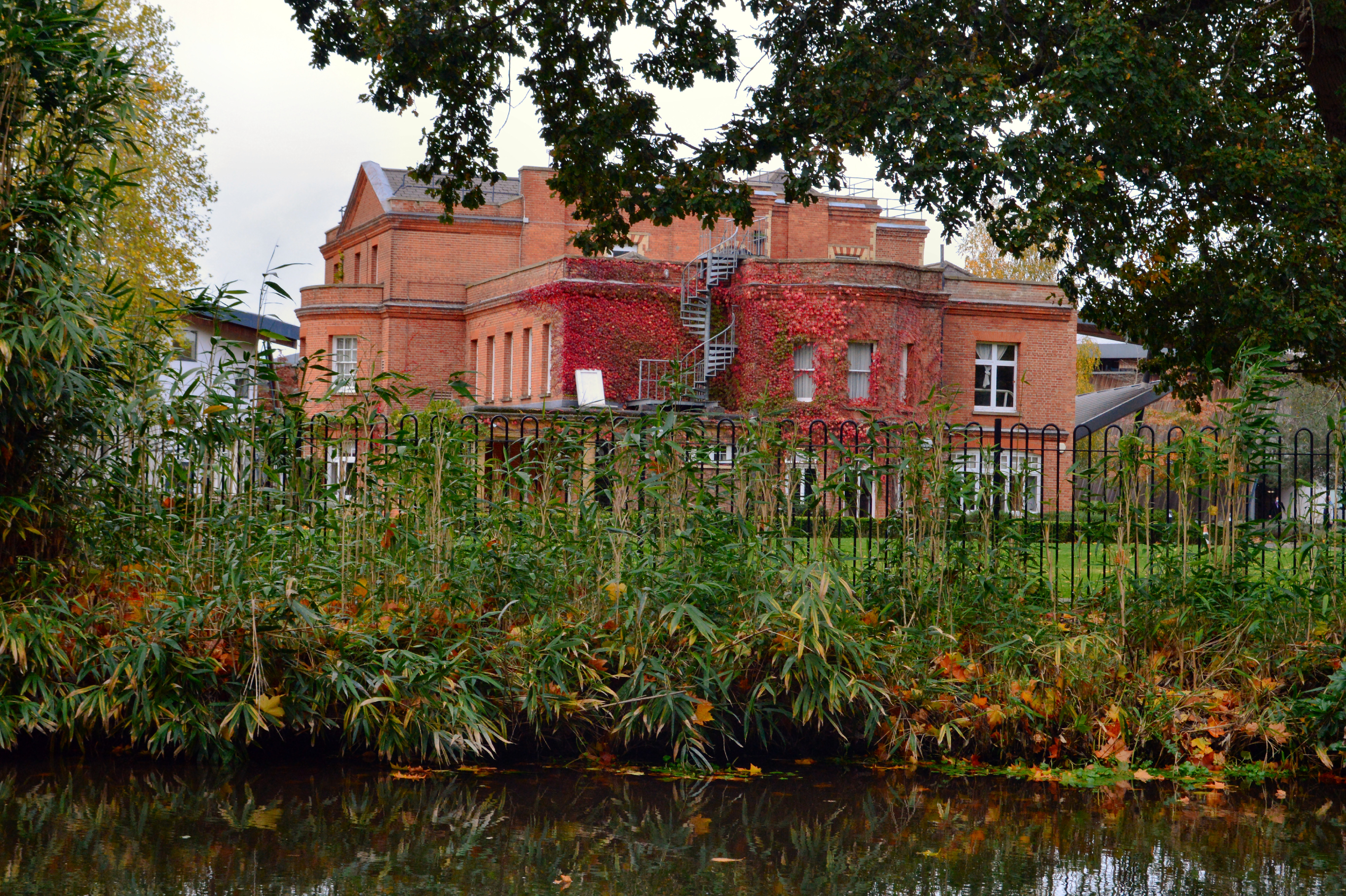
- West Hall from the Wey

- Location within Surrey
- Area: 3.51 km^{2} (1.36 sq mi)
- Population: 5,626 (2011 census)
  - Density: 1,603/km^{2} (4,150/sq mi)
- OS grid reference: TQ043609
  - London: 19 mi (31 km) NE
- Civil parish: n/a
- District: Woking
- Shire county: Surrey
- Region: South East
- Country: England
- Sovereign state: United Kingdom
- Post town: West Byfleet
- Postcode district: KT14
- Dialling code: 01932
- Police: Surrey
- Fire: Surrey
- Ambulance: South East Coast
- UK Parliament: Woking

West Byfleet is a village in Surrey which grew up around its relatively minor stop on the London & South Western Railway: the station, originally Byfleet and Woodham, opened in 1887. More than 1 mile (1.6 km) from the medieval village of Byfleet, the initial concentration of a new development soon established its own economy apart from that of a dependent London commuter village and spread in most directions to its borders including to the border of the old settlement, divided by the shielded M25 motorway today. The first place of worship was dedicated in 1912, the parish of West Byfleet associated with it was established in 1917. The village is bounded to the north by the Basingstoke Canal and to the east by the M25 and the Wey Navigation Canal. Forming part of the contiguous development centred on London and its stockbroker belt just outside the M25 motorway, it is 18 miles from London Heathrow and equidistant between the business parks of Woking and Brooklands. In local government it forms a ward on the same basis as its parish in the Borough of Woking.

== History ==
The history until the establishment of the parish in 1917 is that of Byfleet, which saw most of its current developed land, which was formerly fields in the east and densely wooded heath in the west turned into Victorian and Edwardian smallholdings and large houses in the Victorian and Edwardian periods (1831–1911). The railway station, see transport, opened in 1887, primarily to enable commuting.

The village's first church was dedicated in 1912, the parish of West Byfleet associated with it was established in 1917.

== Amenities ==
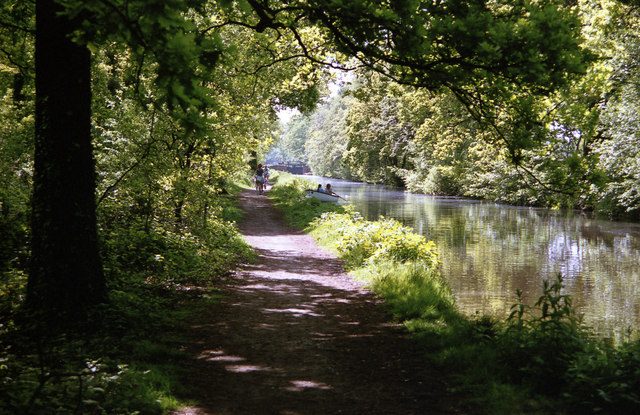
Basingstoke Canal, West Byfleet

The Waitrose food supermarket, built in 1989, lies at the centre of the village. Some 70 shops now trade offering a variety of goods as well as services such as hairdressing, beauty treatments, estate and employment agents. All but one of the retail banks have closed their local offices.

This retail offering has made West Byfleet a focal point for other neighbouring settlements such as Pyrford, New Haw, Woodham, Byfleet and Ripley although Woking remains the main shopping centre for the area. In the 2010s fashion and style shops have complimented the stores offered. An art gallery and vintage gift emporium have also established a West Byfleet focus.

West Byfleet has a large number of restaurants for its size. Three coffee shops, an Italian, a North Indian, a South Indian, a Chinese restaurant and a Chinese takeaway, a pizza takeaway, a wine bar and a Subway are all contained in the small village centre. There is also West Byfleet Social Club that was established in 1912. Fine dining can, at times, be possible. Although there is a small amount of turnover, the number tends to remain the same down the years.

The 1960s development comprising multi-story offices and ground floor shops and a public library which occupied a block at the centre of the village was demolished in 2020 after a long period of redevelopment planning by the local authorities and various potential builders. This meant the loss of the post office, library, two chemists and a number of other retailers. The redevelopment is expected to take until early 2024, and is expected to create many flats and new retail outlets, plus a village square.

The town has one main football club, West Byfleet Albion (not to be confused with West Bromwich Albion) who play in the Guildford and Woking Alliance League.

== Schools ==
Most secondary school students attend Fullbrook School, St John the Baptist School or Bishop David Brown School. Primary level schools are:

- West Byfleet Junior School
- The Marist School.

== Churches ==
- Church of England – St John's the Baptist Church, originally part of the Byfleet parish until West Byfleet was established as a parish in 1917. The church, in its entirety, is the work of the architect W.D. Caroe, including the furnishings. The building was completed in 1912.
- Roman Catholic – Our Lady Help of Christians is on Madeira Road.

== Soil, topography and elevations ==
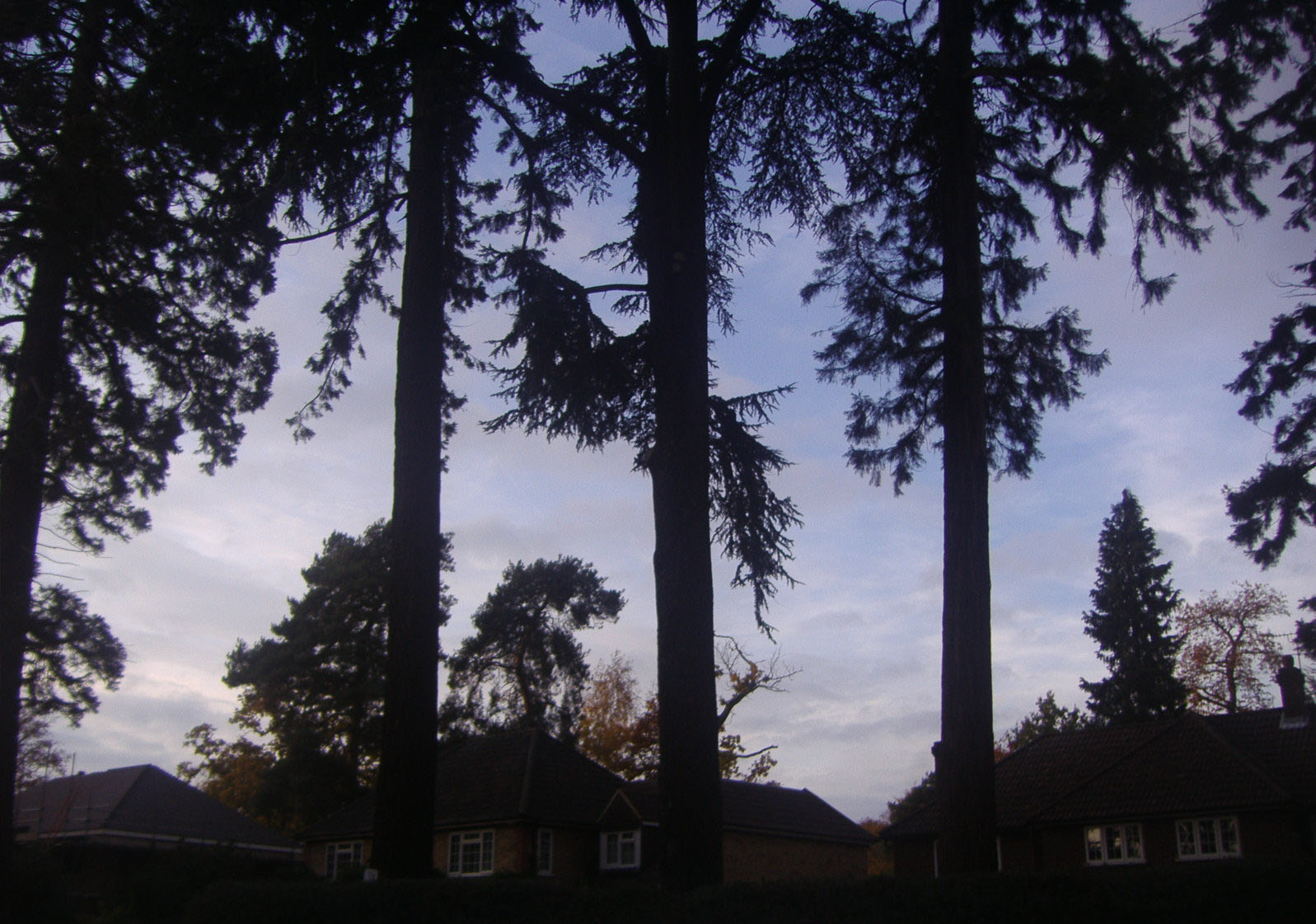
Evergreen trees such as pines are supported by the sandy soil of Parvis Road in the west, an uneroded upcrop of the Bagshot Formation

The surface undulates gently from the west to the east, where West Byfleet's land is drained in the parish of Byfleet itself by the River Wey. Soil ranges from sandy acidic soil in the west to more alluvial soil in the east, underlain by a mixture of gravel and clay. Elevations range from 18m Above Ordnance Datum to 33m.

Birchwood Road and part of Station Road has been designated a Conservation Area. Birchwood Road, built between 1910 and 1920 by Mr Stoop a local landowner, is a mixed development of semi-detached Houses and 3 Blocks of 2 Bedroom flats and at the end of the road is a block of one Bedroom Flats. Between numbers 18-18a and 19-19a was a drying ground with washing lines, that has been sold by Woking Borough Council. There was another drying ground and allotments at the back of houses numbers 47 - 56 and numbers 61 - 65; from numbers 1 - 8 Station Road it is now totally overgrown. The green between the Station and Birchwood Road was given to the tenants as for their use as a Recreation Space by Mr Stoop. There is another Conservation Area east of the Station in Station Approach.

== Notable inhabitants ==
- Sir Sydney Camm, Hawker aircraft designer, see also Brooklands
- Sir George Edwards, Vickers aircraft designer, see also Brooklands
- JC Carroll composer (inc. of The Sound of The Suburbs)
- J C Stobart (1878–1933), author lived latterly by West Byfleet Golf Course, but buried at (Old) Byfleet (inc. of The Glory That Was Greece)
- Dame Anna Neagle (1904–1986) one of Britain's leading film stars in the late 1930s and 1940s, specialising in romantic comedies and costume biographies
- Jean Robinson (1898-1963) first blind British woman to earn an MA. Chair of Middlesex Association for the Blind from 1952 to 1963. Long-term resident of West Byfleet.

== Demography and housing ==
2011 Census Homes
Ward	Detached	Semi-detached	Terraced	Flats and apartments	Caravans/temporary/mobile homes/houseboats	Shared between households
(ward)	1,205	310	239	566	0	0

The average level of accommodation in the region composed of detached houses was 28%, the average that was apartments was 22.6%.

2011 Census Households
Ward	Population	Households	% Owned outright	% Owned with a loan	hectares
(ward)	5,626	2,320	38.2	37.6	351

The proportion of households who owned their home outright compares to the regional average of 35.1%. The proportion who owned their home with a loan compares to the regional average of 32.5%. The remaining % is made up of rented dwellings (plus a negligible % of households living rent-free).

== Transport ==
West Byfleet is well served by rail and road and there are local bus services. West Byfleet can be, road traffic permitting, within 20 minutes of Heathrow and 40 minutes of Gatwick airports.

=== Road ===
Access to the A3 is via the A245 Byfleet Road or via Wisley or Ripley. From the A3 there is easy access to the M25 at its junction 10. Alternatively the M25 is accessed at junction 11 via the A320 Woking Road or by skirting the east side of the M25 via Addlestone.

=== Rail ===
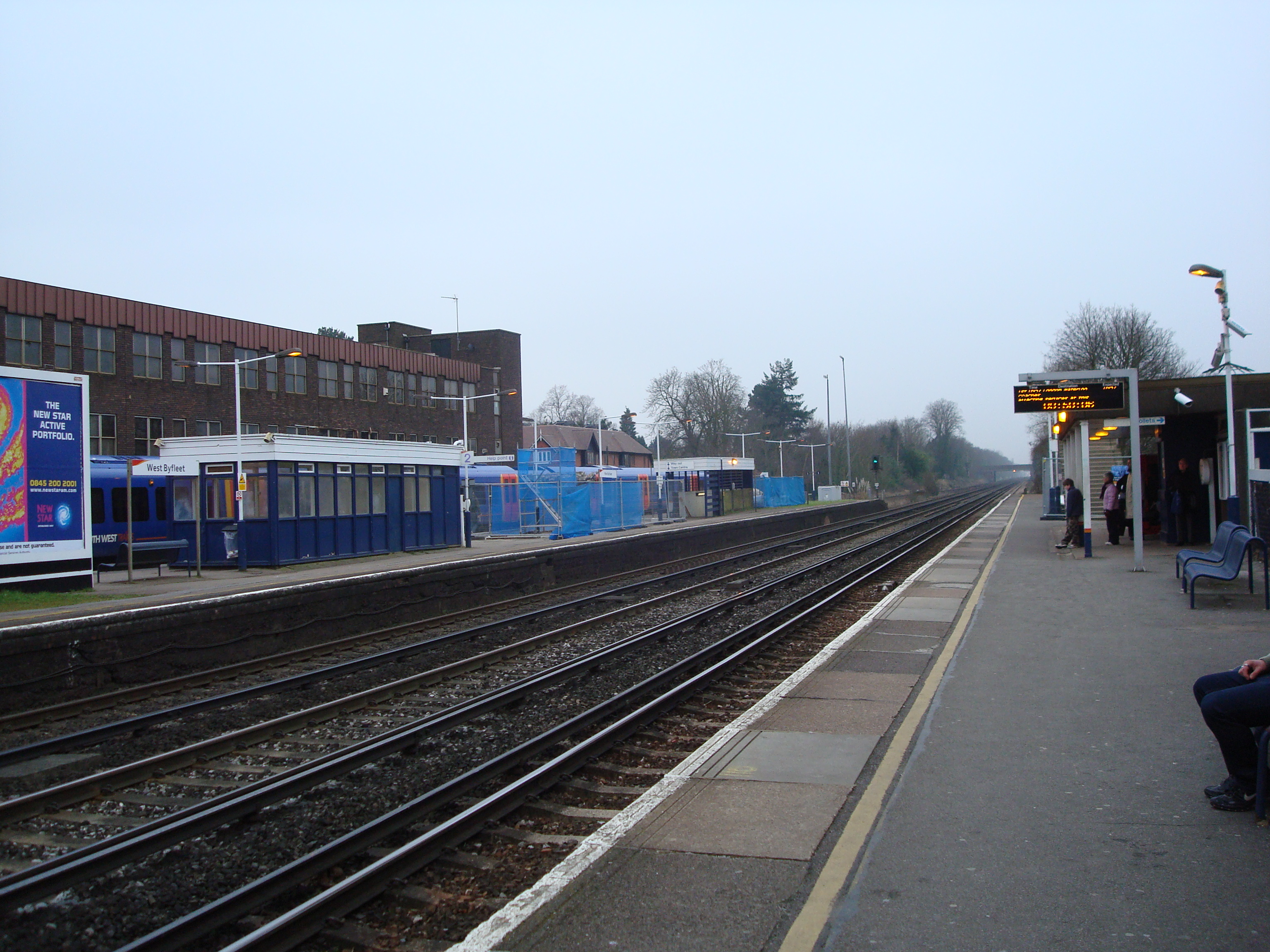
The three platforms of West Byfleet railway station

West Byfleet has commuter train services running on the London to Portsmouth main line offering stopping services to stations such as Waterloo, Clapham Junction, Wimbledon, and Weybridge (all to the NE) and Woking (to the SW). Those wishing to travel further afield or elsewhere will typically change trains at one of these stations. There are typically four trains per hour.

=== Waterways ===
The Basingstoke Canal running east–west to the north of West Byfleet offers a walking and cycling path to Woking. The Wey Navigation runs north–south to the east of the village and it too has a walking and cycling path.

== Bibliography ==
Stevens, Leonard, R (2001) 'A Village of England – Byfleet'

Wakeford, Iain (2004) 'West Byfleet – A Self-Guided Heritage Walk With Notes and Illustrations on the History of the Village and the Basingstoke Canal' (Iain Wakeford, Old Woking, Surrey).
