= King's College, Guildford =

Kings College Guildford

Location
- Southway; Guildford, Surrey, GU2 8DU; England
- Coordinates: 51°14′40″N 0°36′26″W

Information
- Type: Academy
- Motto: Work hard and be kind.
- Established: 1950s
- Local authority: Surrey
- Department for Education URN: 141200 Tables
- Ofsted: Reports
- Principal: Alastair McKenzie
- Gender: Coeducational
- Age: 11 to 16
- Enrolment: 530
- Capacity: 600
- Houses: Sceptre; Orb; Mantle; Crown
- School Hours: 8:25am - 3:00pm (6hrs 35mins)
- Website: www.kingscollegeguildford.com

King's College Guildford is an academy secondary school in Guildford, Surrey, England. It has around 500 pupils.

== History ==
The institution was built and opened by Surrey County Council as Park Barn School in the late 1950s. In 1991, the school was renamed King's Manor School to reflect the medieval until 16th century land ownership of this part of Guildford.

In 2000, King's Manor School was renamed King's College, Guildford under a 10-year management contract with a privately owned company, 3E's Enterprises.

The college established a sixth form in 2009, first rated in the 2011 Ofsted report: Good above the overall rating of the school in the same report: Satisfactory.

At the end of April 2012, Tracy Ward resigned as Principal after three years.

In September 2012, Kate Carriett became Principal and in October of the same year Ofsted reported overall that the school Required Improvement, finding leadership and management in the second-highest of its four simple categorisations, Good.

In September 2014, King's College became a sponsor-led academy under the governorship of the Guildford Education Partnership.

In September 2016, the Guildford Education Partnership appointed Alastair McKenzie as Principal. As of 2023, he is also the head of Fullbrook School.

In December 2016, Ofsted rated King's College as Inadequate. In a reinspection in July 2018, the college was found to be "good". As of 2024, the school's most recent inspection was in June 2024, with an outcome of Good.
