= New Haw =

Village in Surrey, England

Coordinates: 51.358°N 0.4888°W

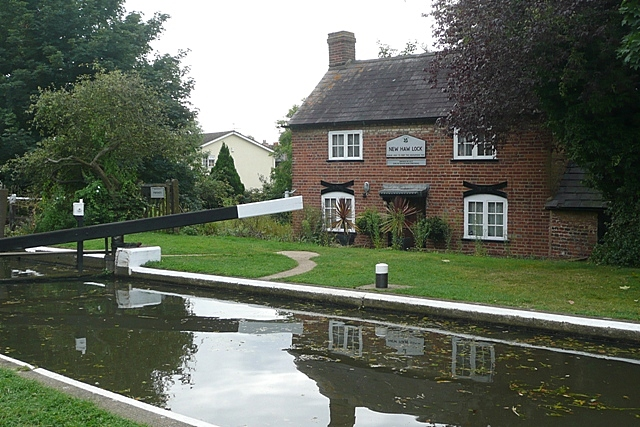
- New Haw Lock

- Location within Surrey
- Area: 3.57 km^{2} (1.38 sq mi)
- Population: 5,757 (Ward includes four short Addlestone streets)
  - Density: 1,613/km^{2} (4,180/sq mi)
- OS grid reference: TQ053631
- District: Runnymede
- Shire county: Surrey
- Region: South East
- Country: England
- Sovereign state: United Kingdom
- Post town: Addlestone
- Postcode district: KT15
- Dialling code: 01932
- Police: Surrey
- Fire: Surrey
- Ambulance: South East Coast
- UK Parliament: Runnymede and Weybridge

New Haw is a village which is part of the Borough of Runnymede in Surrey, England. It is located approximately 1 mile (1.6 km) south of Addlestone and 20 miles (32 km) southwest by west of London.

== Geography ==
New Haw borders Byfleet, Addlestone, Weybridge, Ottershaw, West Byfleet and Woodham.

The Animal Health and Veterinary Laboratories Agency, an executive agency of DEFRA, has its central laboratories in a semi-rural part of New Haw. The laboratory is notable as being one of the principal test centres for the H5N1 virus.

New Haw stands on an irregular south-west border close to Woking, the River Wey, the start of the Basingstoke Canal, and the (River Bourne, Addlestone Branch). The Wey Navigation rises through three steep locks in the relatively short New Haw section.

== History ==
"Haw" is an Old English word for "lock gate", and it is possible that New Haw developed following the installation of the "new" lock gate in 1653, near The White Hart pub. The Grade II Listed New Haw lock-keeper's cottage (pictured) dates from 1782 but was heavily rebuilt with steel strengthening beams added above the ground floor windows after a gas explosion and fire in 1982. It appeared as Mr. Bedford's "Cherry Cottage" in the 1964 science-fiction film First Men in the Moon, based loosely on the H.G. Wells novel of the same title published in 1901.

There is a little evidence of New Haw's history. The original village was a hamlet of Woking, around Crockford Park farm, bordering Addlestone.

Several aeroplanes are believed to have crashed in New Haw during the early decades of the 20th century. On 25 May 1912, an Avro Type F cabin monoplane landed upside down on nearby Addlestone Moor. Photographic evidence of this accident is held by Brooklands Museum.

The village centre lies around the junction of Woodham Lane and the Scotland Bridge Road roundabout and on the northwest side of the latter, until recently, a well-established motor vehicle sales business occupied an original 1930s garage, petrol station and workshop known for many years as "Woodham Motors".

With the commuter boom of the 1950/60s, New Haw expanded further southwest down Woodham Lane towards West Byfleet and Woodham and a popular shopping area for local residents is The Broadway, where a number of shops, public houses and restaurants are located.

== Churches ==
In 1873 All Saints School was founded as a school for Poor Persons, probably with a grant from John Marshall-Paine, who had previously lived at Sayes Court, Addlestone. The school opened in 1874 and included accommodation for 92 pupils. School records show that there were frequent absences during harvesting or at other times when help was needed on the farms. Conditions at the school were far from ideal. The schoolroom was often in need of repair, and during the winter of 1906 temperatures plummeted to 1 °C (35 degrees Fahrenheit), and at one time the teacher of the infants was herself only 11 years old.

In 1911 the school became All Saints' Church. It is part of the diocese of Guildford. All Saints' New Haw has a thriving congregation including a range of youth activities and a full programme of events for all ages. In 2009 Bosco's and Claire's Cafe were added to the church buildings.

== Amenities ==
The village has a number of open spaces. The largest is Heathervale Park, a green space bordering the Basingstoke canal. Fullbrook School offers local residents athletic facilities, including a gym, football pitches, and tennis courts. There are a number of public houses throughout the area: the Black Prince (dating from 1937 and still largely unaltered externally) on Woodham Lane and Scotland Bridge Road roundabout, the Station (was the Claremont, then the Catherine of Aragon) next to West Byfleet railway station, and The White Hart adjacent to the Wey Navigation on New Haw Road roundabout with Woodham Lane and Byfleet Road.

== Education ==
Local schools include: New Haw Junior School, Fullbrook School, the Grange Community Infant School, and the Grove nursery.

== Transport ==
The M25 motorway passes, without junctions for more than 3 miles, through the west of the village. The main north-south road, the A318 road in New Haw is one of few A-roads in the South East to have narrow sections for HGVs at the bridge crossing the Wey Navigation and with a sharp bend on the turn-off for Woodham.

The village has two railway stations: West Byfleet and Byfleet and New Haw, which was originally called West Weybridge.

== Tug of War ==
In the 1950s/60s New Haw and Woodham Tug of War club won a number of national titles. They even appeared in the American magazine Sports Illustrated.
