= Teaching school =

Type of school

The Teaching School as a concept came into being in 2000 when Central Queensland University (in Australia) developed and launched its innovative Bachelor of Learning Management Program (BLM). A core component was the Teaching School which was conceptualised by Professor David Lynch and the first (pilot) 'teaching school' was Kenilworth Community College, on the Sunshine Coast of Australia, under the leadership of Associate Professor David Turner, then the schools principal. The Teaching School is a parallel to the ‘teaching hospital’ in medicine, where the collective capacities and endeavours of a school (ie K-12) and a university (in this case an education faculty) are harnessed through formal partnership to create a sophisticated and enduring community of practice focused on teacher preparation and teaching improvement (Turner & Lynch, 2006; Lynch, 2012). In the medical model, professors and clinicians work side-by side as the constituents of a multi-dimensional ‘medical’ organisation that is sharply focused on practice excellence, improvement, and research. The same logic applies for the teaching school in that it is a new environment for teachers to be prepared (in-service and pre-service) and education research to be undertaken and disseminated for teacher consumption. With the medical teaching hospital construct in mind, the teaching school then conjures an arrangement where a stratified workforce emerges. Think student teachers, interns, associate teachers, working with registered teachers, professors and the numerous advisors from ‘regional education offices’, in a context of inter-related teaching, learning and research assignments. This stratification also represents a continuum of developing expertise, increased site capacities and staff positioning for effects in the teaching school and in the network of schools (or satellite TSs) that are co-opted for global practice scope, scale and impact. On a parallel plane this stratification represents a significant resource and capacity for rethinking how pupils (K-12) in the school might be taught.

In England, a Teaching school is referred to as an Ofsted-graded outstanding school that works with other partners to provide high-quality training and development to school staff. They are part of the UK government's plan to give schools in England a central role in raising standards by developing a self-improving and sustainable school-led system.

They were first introduced in England by the coalition government in 2010, in a white paper entitled "The Importance of Teaching". The intention was to replace the university-based teacher training programmes with a workplace-based school-centred and led approach which devolves responsibility for development and management of education to the schools.
