= Woodham, Surrey =

Village in Surrey, England

Coordinates: 51.347°N 0.511°W

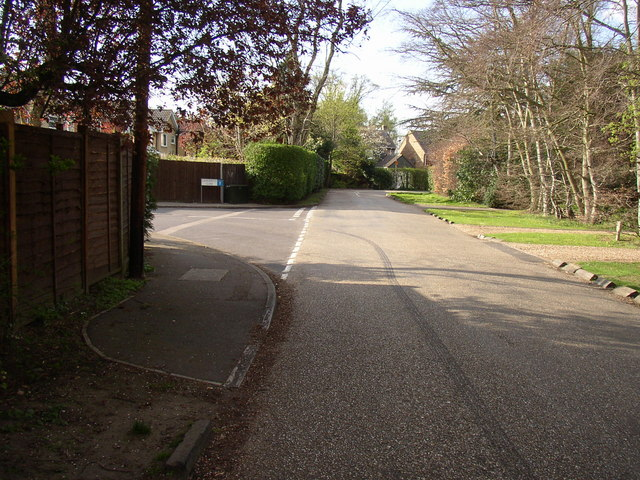
Woodham Park Way

Woodham is a suburban village in Surrey next to New Haw and contiguous with two suburbs of Woking: Sheerwater and West Byfleet.

== Amenities ==
=== Railway ===
All parts of the settlement are within 1 mile (1.6 km) north of West Byfleet or neighbouring Byfleet & New Haw stations which have South West Main Line trains (to/from London Waterloo station), a major and minor stop respectively.

=== Roads ===
The local roads form a complex grid north of Woking bypassing most residential roads, including the east-west access way of the A245 road to the south of Woodham which links Woking to the A3 at Cobham via Brooklands. Two similar roads north-south skirt to the east and west of Woodham linking Woking, and Brooklands respectively, to the M25 motorway. The grid avoids the need for dual carriageways in an area close to the eight-lane motorway which is elevated above the level of immediately surrounding streets, east of Woodham.

=== Schools ===
There are no schools in Woodham itself but there are nursery schools, infant schools, junior schools, primary schools, preparatory schools and state and independent senior schools all nearby, some within walking distance of parts of the settlement. The nearest schools for young children are West Byfleet Community Nursery, Infant and Junior Schools, The Marist Catholic Primary School in West Byfleet, Pyrford C of E Primary School, New Haw Community Junior School, The Grange Community Nursery and Infant Schools in New Haw, Ongar Place Community Primary School in Row Hill and Halstead Nursery and Preparatory School in Horsell. The nearest schools for older children/teenagers are Fullbrook School in New Haw, Bishop David Brown School in Sheerwater, Jubilee High School in Addlestone, Heathside School in Weybridge, Woking High School, Chertsey High School, Salesian Catholic School in Chertsey, Sir William Perkins's (Independent) School in Chertsey, St George's (Independent Catholic) College in Weybridge, Brooklands College and Woking College.

=== Hospital ===
St Peter's Hospital, a large regional facility, is centred 2.5 miles (4.0 km) to the north.

=== Places of worship ===
In the Church of England Woodham is the west half of the ecclesiastical parish of New Haw. This is centred on the Church of All Saints at the west end of Woodham Lane; designed in the Old Surrey style by W F Unsworth, it has been Grade II Listed since 1984. An interesting war memorial (restored after being badly vandalised about 20 years ago and Grade II Listed in 2007) for those who died in both world wars (27 in WW1), stands near the church porch, was designed by Inigo Triggs and dedicated in 1920. A separate church hall is located beyond the car park at the rear. The parish was formed in 1902 (from what had been part of Chertsey and then its offshoot Addlestone)

In the Catholic Church the parish is West Byfleet, based close the railway station at the Church of Our Lady, Help of Christians.

In Islam the closest mosque, by a small margin, is in the Deobandi tradition, with a management mainly of British Bangladeshis, at the Surrey Muslim Centre, Albert Road, Addlestone. The large Shah Jahan Mosque, Woking preaches in a range of the Sufi – Bareilvi traditions with a management formed mainly of British Pakistanis.

Former places of worship

A Baptist chapel was built in 1872, and a Wesleyan chapel in 1898.

=== Sports Facilities ===
The well-established New Zealand Golf Club is situated parallel to Woodham Lane.

=== Sports Clubs ===
Woodham is the home of Woodham Victoria Football Club.

== Landmarks ==
There are currently three nationally designated Listed buildings/structures in Woodham. Apart from the Church of All Saints and adjacent War Memorial already described above, there is an impressive Grade II Listed large private house named Woodhambury and Woodbrow located on the south side of Woodham Lane just east of the Martyrs Lane junction. Designed in the Vernacular style by architect W F Unsworth (1851-1912) as his own home, it was completed in 1889 but sympathetically subdivided in the 1950s.

== Local authority and demography ==
Woodham is a ward in Runnymede Borough Council. Its population at the 2011 Census was 5304.
