= 1918 New Year Honours (MM) =

This is a list of Military Medals (MM) awarded in the 1918 New Year Honours.

The 1918 New Year Honours were appointments by King George V to various orders and honours to reward and highlight good works by citizens of the British Empire. The appointments were published in The London Gazette and The Times in January, February and March 1918.

Unlike the 1917 New Year Honours, the 1918 honours was dominated by rewards for war efforts. As The Times reported: "The New Year Honours represent largely the circumstances of war, and, perhaps, as usual, they also reflect human nature in an obvious form. The list is one of the rare opportunities for the public to scan the names of soldiers who have distinguished themselves in service."

== Recipients of the Military Medal ==
- Pte. F. W. Abell, South Staffordshire Reg. (Leicester)
- Sgt. W. G. Abor, Honourable Arty. Company (Wallington)
- Pte. G. H. Ackland, Grenadier Guards (Bow, London)
- Sgt. O. T. Acton, Machine Gun Corps (Horton Kirby)
- Pte. A. H. Adams, North Staffordshire Reg. (Cheadle)
- Sgt. J. Adamson, Seaforth Highlanders (Motherwell)
- Bombr. A. Adie, Royal Field Arty. (Bayswater W.)
- Pte. R. Affleck, Scots Guards (Johnstone)
- L. Cpl. W. Agnew DCM Royal Engineers (Belfast)
- Pte. R. Ainscow, Lancashire Fusiliers (Pendleton)
- Pte. R. Alderson, Grenadier Guards (Hawes)
- Pte. D. Allan, King's Own Scottish Borderers (Buckhaven)
- L. Cpl. J. McP. Allan, Scots Guards (Glasgow)
- Spr. F. S. Allen, Royal Engineers (Derby)
- Dvr. J. H. Allen, Royal Field Arty. (Otley)
- L. Cpl. R. Allenby, Northumberland Fusiliers Norristhorpe)
- L. Cpl. F. Allison, Yorkshire Reg. (Everingham)
- Gnr. F. H. Allon, Royal Field Arty. (Hexham)
- Sgt. W. Allsopp, Nottinghamshire and Derbyshire Reg. (Watford)
- Dvr. H. Alexander, Royal Field Arty. (Finsbury, E.G.)
- Pte. P. Alexander, Welsh Reg. (Poulton-Wallasey)
- Cpl. J. E. Ames, Middlesex Reg. (Manor Park)
- Pte. H. Amey, Dorsetshire Reg. (Farnham)
- Cpl. J. Amos, Royal Field Arty. (Moffat)
- Cpl. A. Anderson, Royal Highlanders (Dunfennline)
- Cpl. J. Anderson, Royal Field Arty. (Tyrone)
- Pte. J. Anderson, Liverpool Reg. (Liver pool)
- Sgt. J. C. Andrew, Duke of Cornwall's Light Inf. (Truro)
- Sgt. A. Andrews, Machine Gun Corps (Lyndhurst)
- Sgt. A. Appleby, Royal Field Arty. (Houghtonle-Spring)
- Sgt. W. Appleby, Northumberland Fusiliers (Newcastle upon Tyne)
- Pte. T. Appleyard, Northumberland Fusiliers (Cudworth)
- Pte. A. E. Apps, Royal Warwickshire Reg. (Birmingham)
- Pte. S. Apps, Yorkshire (Kent)
- Pte. R. F. Archibald, Gordon Highlanders (Glasgow)
- Pte. A. Armsby, Norfolk Reg., attd. Machine Gun Corps (Downham)
- Pte. W. Armstrong, Irish Guards (Newbliss)
- Pte. V. A. Arnold, West Riding Reg. (Norfolk)
- Pte.A. H. Arundell, Royal West Kent Reg. (Rotherhithe)
- Cpl. S. Ashcroft, Labour Corps (Walton)
- Pte. W. Ashe, Grenadier Guards (Middlesbrough)
- Fitter Sergeant A. Ashley, Royal Field Arty. (Altrinc. bam)
- L. Cpl. W. H. Ashman, Royal Engineers (Bath)
- Cpl. C. Ashton, Royal Field Arty. (Kirton-in. Lindsey)
- Gnr. R. Ashton, Royal Field Arty. (Shipley)
- Pte. R. Ashworth, Lancashire Fusiliers (Rochdale)
- Pte. A. Askew, Bedfordshire Reg. (Yaxley)
- Pte. J. Askew, Grenadier Guards (Long Ichington)
- Pte. H. P. Atherton, Cheshire Reg. (Chester)
- Pte. A. F. Atkin, York & Lancaster Reg. (Sheffield)
- L. Cpl. A. B. Atkinson, Gordon Highlanders (Leith)
- Spr. G. Atkinson, Royal Engineers (Gateshead)
- Pte. J. W. Atkinson, Northumberland Fusiliers (Darlington)
- Sgt. R. R. Atkinson, Norfolk Reg. (Brighton)
- Cpl. W. Atkinson, Royal Engineers (Leeds)
- Pte. W. Atkinson, Northumberland Fusiliers (Scarborough)
- Cpl. D. C. Attwood, Royal Engineers (Greenwich)
- Pte. A. E. Austin, Seaforth Highlanders (Oxford)
- Pte. S. Austin, Royal West Kent Reg. (E. New Cross)
- Act. Cpl. T. Austin, South Staffordshire Reg. (Darlaston)
- Gnr. J. Avenell, Royal Field Arty. (Maidstone)
- Cpl. W. Attwood, Royal Lancaster Reg. (Southall)
- Pte. A. C. Avery, Rifle Brigade (London)
- L. Cpl. C. Babb, Duke of Cornwall's Light Inf. (Marhamchurch)
- Dvr. B. Bache, Royal Field Arty. (Worcester)
- L. Cpl. 8 Back, Oxfordshire & Buckinghamshire Light Inf. (Leeds, Kent)
- Pte. A. H. Bailey, Coldstream Guards (Eccleshall)
- L. Cpl. F. S. Bailey, South Staffordshire Reg. (Birmingham)
- Dvr. S. Bailey, Royal Field Arty. (York)
- Spr. J. Baillie, Royal Engineers (Mulengavie)
- Cpl. A. Baker, Royal Field Arty. (E. Finchley)
- Pte. A E. Baker, Suffolk Reg. (Nacton)
- Sgt. C. Baker, Royal Horse Arty. (Trowbridge)
- Pte. C. J. Baker, Royal West Surrey Reg. (Brading, Isle of Wight)
- L. Cpl. H. J. Baker, Royal Sussex Reg. (Goring-on-Sea)
- Act. Cpl. R. Baker, Machine Gun Corps (E. Camiberwell)
- Pte. L. M. Baldwin, East Surrey Reg. (Gorleston-on-Sea)
- Pte. W. J. Bale, London Reg. (Tollington Park)
- Pte. G. Ball, Rifle Brigade (Islington)
- Pitt. E. Ballantyne, Royal Field Arty. (Seaham Harbour)
- Pte. V. Ballard, Machine Gun Corps (Kingston upon Thames)
- Sgt. P. Ballinger, Royal Garrison Arty. (Darlington)
- Cpl. T. Balshaw, Gordon Highlanders (Chorley)
- Pte. A. Bamford, Gloucestershire Reg. (Clifton)
- Pte. J. W. Banks, Coldstream Guards (Wolverhampton)
- Pte. J. Bannan, Border Reg. (Carlisle)
- L. Cpl. R. Banner, Royal Scots (Perth)
- Pte. W. W. Bannister, Suffolk Reg. (Madingley)
- Pte. W. Bapty, West Yorkshire Reg. (Leeds)
- Cpl. E. Barber, Royal Engineers (Toilbridge)
- Pte. C. Barclay, Gordon Highlanders (Drumblade)
- Sgt. T. Barclay, Royal Field Arty. (Glasgow)
- Pte. G. Barden, Royal West Kent Reg. (Tunbridge Wells)
- Pte. E. Barnes, Lincolnshire Reg. (Gainsborough)
- Pte. E. Barrow, Army Service Corps (Preston)
- Pnr. M. Barry, Royal Engineers (Burnley)
- Sgt. P. Barry, Royal Field Arty. (Cork)
- Dvr.W. Bartlett, Royal Field Arty. (Fairford)
- Sgt. A. E. Barton, West Yorkshire Reg. (York)
- Gnr. J. C. Bass, Royal Field Arty. (Mile End, London)
- L. Cpl. H. Bassett, Royal Sussex Reg. (Balsall)
- Dvr. S. Baster, Royal Field Arty. (Forest Gate, London)
- Spr. W. H. Bastin, Royal Engineers (Exeter)
- Pte. W. Bateman, West Yorkshire Reg. (Sauchie)
- Cpl. G. Bates, Border Reg. (Kettering)
- Cpl. A. S. Batley, Norfolk Reg. (Billingford)
- Pte. H. Bayliff, Royal Welsh Fusiliers (Abergele)
- Pte. W. Beardsall, Nottinghamshire and Derbyshire Reg. (Retford)
- Pnr. A. Beaston, Royal Engineers (Sheffield)
- L. Cpl. G. E. Beattie, Northumberland Fusiliers (Felling-on-Tyne)
- Sgt. J. Beattie, Machine Gun Corps (Kirkcudbright)
- Cpl. J. D. Beattie, Royal Garrison Arty. (Aspatria)
- Pte. C. Beckett, Shropshire Light Inf. (Pembroke Dock)
- Pte. A. G. Beddoes, London Reg. (Canning Town)
- Dvr. C. Belandj Royal Field Arty. (Euston Rd., London)
- Pte. E. E. Bell, West Riding Reg. (Otley)
- Pte. H. Bell, Machine Gun Corps (Edinburgh)
- Cpl. P. Bell, Argyll and Sutherland Highlanders (Kirkintilloch)
- Cpl. J. Bell, Devonshire Reg. (Lambeth, London)
- Pte. J. Bell, East Yorkshire Reg. (Hull)
- Cpl. R. Bell, Northumberland Fusiliers (South Shields)
- Pte. J. W. Bellamy, Suffolk Reg. (Dartford)
- Cpl. R. S. Fielsten, Royal Field Arty. (Bristol)
- Sgt. G. Bennett, Royal Field Arty. (Nuneaton)
- Act. Bombr. G. Bennett, Royal Field Arty. (Heckmondwike)
- Spr. J. Bennett, Royal Engineers (Manchester)
- Sgt. W. J. Bennett, Devonshire Reg. (Winsbere Buckland)
- Sgt. R. F. Benton, Royal Engineers (Railway)
- Pte. M. Bergin, Lancashire Fusiliers (Seedley)
- Pte. J. T. Berridge, West Riding Reg. (Spalding)
- Sgt. F. Berry, Lancashire Fusiliers (Bury)
- Sgt. H. Berry, Leicestershire Reg. (Leicester)
- Fitter Cpl. W. G. Best, Royal Field Arty. (Blackhalls)
- Pte. A. Beswick, Coldstream Guards (Old Kent Road, London)
- L. Sgt. E. W. Betts, Coldstream Guards (Doncaster)
- Bombr. H. E. Betts, Royal Field Arty. (Kennington, London)
- Pte. E. Bevan, South Staffordshire Reg. (Wednesbury)
- Pte. A. Bibby, King's Own Scottish Borderers (Blackburn)
- Cpl. W. Bibby, Royal Field Arty. (Wigan)
- Gnr. G. A. Biggs, Royal Field Arty. (Wandsworth, London)
- L. Cpl. W. Bigley, East Yorkshire Reg. (Jarrow)
- L. Cpl. J. E. Bilham, Royal Sussex Reg. (Norwich)
- Pte. J. Billington, York & Lancaster Reg. (Wombwell)
- Pte. B. C. Bingham, Royal Sussex Reg. (Brighton)
- L. Cpl. W. Bingham, Nottinghamshire and Derbyshire Reg. (Crewe)
- Sgt. C. Birch, West Yorkshire Reg. (Burley)
- Spr. W. H. Birch, Royal Engineers (Glasgow)
- Cpl. A. H. Bird, Gloucestershire Reg. (Cirencester)
- Pte. S. Bird, Cambridgeshire Reg. (Littleport)
- Pte. W. Bird, South Staffordshire Reg. (Bridgtown)
- SSO/C. J. Birks, Northumberland Fusiliers (Chesterton)
- Sgt. G. Birrell, Royal Highlanders (Edinburgh)
- Cpl. N. Birtles, Royal Field Arty. (Alderley Edge)
- Pte. L. Bishop, York & Lancaster Reg. (South Witham)
- Cpl. D. Black, Irish Guards (Kilrueh, County Cork)
- Pte. J. Black, Border Reg. (Coundon)
- Pte. J. W. Blackburn, West Yorkshire Reg. (Rothwell)
- Pte. W. Blaikie, Machine Gun Corps (Berwick-on-Tweed)
- Pte. S. J. Blake, Royal West Surrey Reg. (Spital)
- Dvr. T. A. Blake, Royal Field Arty. (Bramshaw)
- Sgt. H. Blakeley, Royal Garrison Arty. (Leeds)
- Pte. E. Blease, Cheshire Reg. (Congleton)
- Cpl. W. S. Bliss, King Edward's Horse Reg. (Watford)
- Pte. C. H. Blunden, Royal Sussex Reg. (Walderton)
- Sgt. W. Blunt, Royal Warwickshire Reg. (Handsworth)
- Pte. W. Blythe, Coldstream Guards (Manley, Helsby)
- L. Cpl. C. Boardman, South Staffordshire Reg. (Hednesford)
- Pte. J. Boardman, Border Reg. (Manchester)
- L. Cpl. D. Boath, Royal Engineers (E. Dundee)
- Pte. F. E. Bocock, Norfolk Reg. (Louth)
- Pte. E. Body, Lincolnshire Reg. (Coleby)
- Spr. J. J. Boeg, Royal Engineers (Westbourne Park)
- Sgt. G. Bolton, Gordon Highlanders (Blackburn)
- Sgt. W. J. Bolton, Hampshire Reg. (Micheldever)
- Pte. B. Bond, Grenadier Guards (Stone)
- Gnr. W. Bone, Royal Field Arty. (Durham)
- Cpl. W. Boniface, Royal Sussex Reg. (Seaford)
- Dvr. M. Bonnallo, Royal Field Arty. (Nottingham)
- Pte. M. C. Bonnar, Army Service Corps (Paisley)
- Pte. W. Bonner, RAMC (Derry)
- Pte. F. J. Bond, Devonshire Reg. (Coombe Martin)
- Pte. J. Boocock, Royal West Surrey Reg. (Halifax)
- L. Cpl. E. Booth, West Riding Reg. (Halifax)
- Act. Bombr. J. Booth, Royal Field Arty. (Windhill, Bradford)
- Pte. J. Booth, Machine Gun Guards (Tarnworth)
- Pte. J. H. Booth, Lancashire Fusiliers (Whitefield)
- Pte. M. E. Booth, Coldstream Guards (Upper Holloway, London)
- Pte. L. R. B. Booth, Liverpool Reg. (Manchester)
- Dvr. T. Booth, Royal Field Arty. (Macclesfield)
- L. Cpl. H. Boshier, King's Own Scottish Borderers (Reading)
- Pte. G. W. Boswell, Army Service Corps (St. Clements)
- L. Sgt. N. A. Bott, Suffolk Reg. (Birmingham)
- Pte. R. Bottomley, RAMC (Leeds)
- Dvr. J. Boughton, Royal Field Arty. (Barnes)
- Sgt. H. Bourne, Yorkshire Reg. (Leeds)
- Pte. S. F. Bourne, RAMC (Canterbury)
- Sgt. N. J. Bournes, Yorkshire Reg. (Rochester)
- Pte. C. Bouttell, RAMC (Hackney)
- Cpl. G. A. Bowen, North Staffordshire Reg. (Burton-on-Trent)
- L. Cpl. E. C. Bower, York & Lancaster Reg. (Sheffield)
- Cpl. H. Bower, RAMC (Sheffield)
- L. Cpl. W. Bowkett, Yorkshire Light Inf. (Cheltenham)
- Pte. J. W. Bown, Leicestershire Reg. (Mansfield)
- Pte. J. W. Boxall, Bedfordshire Reg. (Petworth)
- Pte. F. H. Boyer, RAMC (Newton Abbot)
- Pte. W. Boys, RAMC (Liverpool)
- Pte. H. Bradbury, Liverpool Reg. (Manchester)
- Pte. J. Bradbury, Manchester Reg. (Salford)
- Pte. E. E. Bradfield, Somerset Light Inf. (Bath)
- Sgt. C. Bradshaw, Leicestershire Reg. (Coalville)
- L. Cpl. R. Bragg, Border Reg. (Halliwell)
- Spr. J. Braid, Royal Engineers (Edinburgh)
- Pte. S. J. Brain, Gloucestershire Reg. (Bristol)
- Pte. L. Brame, Coldstream Guards (Gainsborough)
- L. Cpl. G. S. Brampton, Honourable Arty. Company (Westcliff-on-Sea)
- Gnr. E. D. Branch, Royal Garrison Arty. (Slingham)
- Pte. A. A. Brawn, RAMC (Wellingborough)
- Pte. F. A. Brearley, London Reg. (Buiwell)
- Pte. C. Breen, Lancashire Fusiliers (Salford)
- Pte. J. Breheny, Yorkshire Reg. (South Shields)
- L. Sgt. A. Bremner, Gordon Highlanders (Caithness)
- Pte. J. K. Brennan, Durham Light Inf. (Quebec)
- Pte. H. Bridger, Royal West Kent Reg. (Worthing)
- Cpl. T. J. Bridges, Worcestershire Reg. (Kidderminster)
- Pte. J. Bridle, Royal West Kent Reg. (Acton)
- Pte. G. Briggs, Border Reg. (Irlam)
- Sgt. H. Briggs, Royal Field Arty. (Lewes)
- Pte. T. W. Briggs, Lancashire Fusiliers (Batley)
- Bombr. W. Brigge, Royal Field Arty. (Bradford)
- Cpl. R. Brightmore, Royal Engineers (Hulme)
- Pte. S. J. Brighton, Suffolk Reg. (St. Peters, Suffolk)
- Gnr. W. Brigstock, Royal Field Arty. (Shoreditch, London)
- Sgt. H. J. Brimble, Royal Field Arty. (Waiworth)
- Cpl. S. Bristow, RAMC (Atherstone)
- Pte. D. Brittain, Royal West Kent Reg. (Deptford)
- Pte. F. Britton, Royal West Kent Reg. (Kennington)
- Dvr. J. A. Brixton, Royal Engineers (Cardiff)
- Sgt. G. F. Broadrick, Royal Field Arty. (Doncaster)
- Sgt. R. E. Brockbank, Royal Lancaster Reg. (Camforth)
- Pte. F. Brooker, Middlesex Reg. (Highgate)
- Sgt. J. Brooker, Royal Field Arty. (Acton, London)
- L. Sgt. R. Brooker, Coldstream Guards (Peckham, London)
- Pte. C. H. Brooks, Manchester Reg. (Swindon)
- Spr. F. W. Brooks, Royal Engineers (Burslem)
- Pte. G. J. Brooks, Royal West Surrey Reg. (Belvedere)
- Spr. J. Brooks, Royal Engineers (Derby)
- Pte. R. J. Brooks, Norfolk Reg. (Hickling)
- Pte. R. J. Brooks, Coldstream Guards (Hafbury)
- L. Cpl. J. Brough, Nottinghamshire and Derbyshire Reg. (Clay Cross)
- L. Cpl. P. W. Broughton, Royal West Kent Reg. (Tottenham)
- L. Cpl. A. Brown, Seaforth Highlanders (Cowdenbeath)
- Sgt. A. G. Brown, Labour Corps (Borough, London)
- L. Cpl. B. Brown, Devonshire Reg. (Halberton)
- Pte. G. Brown, Nottinghamshire and Derbyshire Reg. (Bedford)
- Dvr. F. J. Brown, Royal Field Arty. (Willesden, London)
- L. Sgt. G. Brown, East Surrey Reg. (Rotherlnthe, London)
- Sgt. G. E. Brown, Royal Field Arty. (Upper Tooting, London)
- Sgt. H. H. Brown, Royal Garrison Arty. (Weymouth)
- Pte. J. Brown, Scots Guards (Buckhaven)
- L.C. J. H. Brown, Hampshire Reg. (Linkenhorne, Cornwall)
- L. Cpl. T. Brown, Royal Engineers (Mumbles)
- Spr. W. Brown, Royal Engineers (Worcester)
- Pnr. W. H. Brown, Royal Engineers (Leeds)
- Pte. T. Broxholme, Royal Lancaster Reg. (Louth)
- Pte. W. A. Bruce, London Reg. (King's Cross, London)
- Act. Cpl. W. Brueton, South Staffordshire Reg. (Wolverhampton)
- Pte. S. Brummit, West Riding Reg. (Dalton)
- Sgt. E. A. Bryant, Norfolk Reg. (Diss)
- Sgt. F. Bryant, Lincolnshire Reg. (Lincoln)
- Spr. W. A. Bryant, Royal Engineers (Coulsdon)
- Cpl. H. Bryden, West Riding Reg. (Barnoldswick)
- Cpl. A. Buchan, Royal Scots (Bathgate)
- Pte. F. T. G. Buchanan, RAMC (East Ham)
- Bombr. J. Buchanan, Royal Field Arty. (Glasgow)
- Pte. A. Buckley, RAMC (Shaw)
- Pte. W. Buckley, West Riding Reg. (Houley)
- Pte. F. Bullivant, Worcestershire Reg. (Rastrick)
- L. Cpl. P. C. L. H. Bulmer, Royal Engineers (Halifax)
- Pte. G. E. Bunce, Royal Warwickshire Reg. (Handsworth)
- Pte. H. Bunyan, Leicestershire Reg. (Luton)
- Pte. J. Burbidge, RAMC (Doncaster)
- Pte. P. Burchmore, Northumberland Fusiliers (Stockton-on-Tees)
- Sgt. E. S. Burke, Royal Warwickshire Reg. (Peckham, London)
- Sgt. J. Burke, Royal Engineers (Manchester)
- Pte. J. F. Burke, North Staffordshire Reg. (Hanley)
- Pte. L. Burke, West Riding Reg. (Kigh
- Pte. T. Burke, Liverpool Reg. (New York)
- Sgt. T. Burkhill, West Yorkshire Reg. (Coxwold)
- Pte. A. V. Burns, Coldstream Guards (Bexhill)
- Pte. J. W. Burrough, Gloucestershire Reg. (Bristol)
- Dvr. T. Burns, Royal Field Arty. (Bradford)
- Pte. A. O. Burton, Royal Welsh Fusiliers (Neath)
- Pte. C. Burton, RAMC (West Hartlepool)
- Pte. H. Burton, RAMC (Hunslet)
- Sgt. S. Bury, Royal Field Arty. (Moffat, N.B.)
- Dvr. E. A. Bustard, Royal Field Arty. (Denmark Hill, London)
- Pte. A. E. Butler, Coldstream Guards (Whitechapel, London)
- Cpl. A. H. Butler, Royal Berkshire Reg. (Newbury)
- Pte. C. H. T. Butler, Machine Gun Corps (Langky)
- Gnr. J. Butler, Royal Field Arty. (S. Ealing, London)
- Pte. T. Butler, Middlesex Reg. (Sunderland)
- Spr. J. Buttle, Royal Engineers (Manchester)
- Pte. S. V. Button, West Yorkshire Reg. (Leeds)
- Sgt. W. Caddick, Royal Garrison Arty. (Coseley)
- Pte. P. Cage, East Surrey Reg. (Supeston)
- Pte. E. Cahill, Royal West Kent Reg. (Deptford)
- Cpl. C. E. Calver, Suffolk Reg. (Dennington)
- Gnr. H. Cameron, Royal Garrison Arty. (Lochfyne)
- Bombr. M. S. Camp, Royal Field Arty. (Berk, Hampsted)
- Cpl. A. Campbell, Gordon Highlanders (S. America)
- Staff Sergeant Cpl. J. Campbell, Royal Field Arty. ( (Renfrew)
- L. Cpl. W. Campbell, Gordon Highlanders (Rinton)
- Pte. E. P. Campion, West Riding Reg. (Manchester)
- Gnr. W. Candlin, Royal Field Arty. (Worcester)
- Gnr. M. Cannel, Royal Field Arty. (Kilburh, London)
- Sgt. H. Cannon, Royal Field Arty. (Lancaster)
- Spr. J. Cantwell, Royal Engineers (Clonmel)
- L. Cpl. E. T. Cape, Duke of Cornwall's Light Inf. (N. Kensington)
- Pte. A. Capewell, Nottinghamshire and Derbyshire Reg. (Heath Town)
- Pte. J. Capp, Royal West Surrey Reg. (Brighton)
- Sgt. J. H. Carlin, Cameron Highlanders (Tendon)
- Pte. J. Carr, Durham Light Inf. (Spennymoor)
- Spr. J. Q. Carroll Royal Engineers (Sykes Holt)
- Pte. H. Carter, Lincolnshire Reg. (Louth)
- L. Cpl. O. R. Cartwright Lincolnshire Reg. (Louth)
- L. Cpl. G. H. Cartwright, South Staffordshire Reg. (Bloxwich)
- L. Cpl. J. E. Carver, Dorsetshire Reg. (Wavertree)
- Cpl. W. H. Cash, Royal Field Arty. (Walsall)
- Gnr. W. J. Cash, Royal Field Arty. (Denmark Hill, London)
- L. Cpl. W. Casley, Duke of Cornwall's Light Inf. (St. Just)
- Pte. V. S. Cassarley, West Yorkshire Reg. (Bradford)
- Pte. W. Cassidy, Gordon Highlanders (Glasgow)
- L. Cpl. E. Casson, Royal Engineers (Lowick)
- Bombr. J. Casson, Royal Field Arty. (Portobello)
- Sgt. A. E. Castle, Royal Field Arty. (Stamford Street, London)
- Pte. F. Castle, West Riding Reg. (Huddersfield)
- Bombr. C. Caswell, Royal Marine Field Arty. (Wolverhampton)
- Pte. J. Cathey, Northumberland Fusiliers (Newcastle)
- Cpl. J. S. Catley, Gloucestershire Reg. (Bristol)
- Pte. W. W. Cattell, Oxfordshire & Buckinghamshire Light Inf. (Deanshanger)
- Sgt. J. W. Catterrall, East Lancashire Reg. (Haslingden)
- Sgt. C. Cavanagh, Gordon Highlanders (Maud)
- L. Cpl. E. Cave, Suffolk Reg. (Chatteris)
- Sgt. W. E. Cave, Northumberland Fusiliers (Sheffield)
- Pte. J. Caulfield, West Riding Reg. (Keighleigh)
- Pte. A. Cawkwell, Machine Gun Corps (Four Stones)
- Pte. J. Chadwick, Manchester Reg. (Wigan)
- L. Sgt. F. E. Chamberlain, Coldstream Guards (Upton Park, London)
- Pte. F. Chandler, Royal Sussex Reg. (Petworth)
- Sgt. A. Chapman, Royal Engineers (Leeds)
- Pte. H. Chapman, Grenadier Guards (Hintmore)
- Pte. J. Chard, Gloucestershire Reg. (Bristol)
- Gnr. E. Chapman, Royal Field Arty. (Epping)
- Pte. J. H. Charlton, Machine Gun Corps (Euston Square, London)
- Pte. M. Charlton, Coldstream Guards (Elswick)
- Pte. W. Charlton, West Yorkshire Reg. (Sunderland)
- Sgt. W. Chatterley, Royal Warwickshire Reg. (Walsall)
- Pte. A. Cheshire, Coldstream Guards (Widnes)
- Act. Sgt. T. W. Chesson, Royal West Kent Reg. (Edenbridge)
- Cpl. A. E. Chew, Royal Field Arty. (Portsmouth)
- Cpl. H. Childs, Machine Gun Corps (Newmarket)
- Pte. H. Childs, Nottinghamshire and Derbyshire Reg.
- Wheeler-Cpl. W. J. Childs, Royal Field Arty. (Seaham Harbour)
- Sgt. J. A. Christopher, Lincolnshire Reg. (Grimsby)
- Pte. W. Church, RAMC (Birmingham)
- Pte. C. A. Clare, Norfolk Reg., attd. Machine Gun Company (Watford)
- Sgt. H. J. Claridge, Royal Field Arty. (Southleigh)
- L. Cpl. C. Clark, East Yorkshire Reg. (Hull)
- Pte. C. C. Clark, Royal West Surrey Reg. (Croydon)
- Sgt. E. W. T. Clark, Royal Field Arty. (Princes Risboro)
- Pte. F. Clark, Lincolnshire Reg. (Wisbech)
- Pte. F. G. Clark, RAMC (Bristol)
- Bombr. G. Clark, Royal Field Arty. (Auckenleck)
- Sgt. G. Clark, Royal Warwickshire Reg. (Atherstone)
- Pte. G. H. Clark, Royal Sussex Reg. (Brighton)
- Gnr. T. Clark, Royal Field Arty. (Leeds)
- Pte. J. H. Clark, Bedfordshire Reg. (Buntingford)
- Cpl. R. Clarke, Border Reg. (Coventry) (Leeds)
- Pte. G. Clarke, South Staffordshire Reg. (Leicester)
- Sgt. H. Clarke, Royal Field Arty. (Wigan)
- Sgt. J. W. Clarke, Nottinghamshire and Derbyshire Reg. (Nottingham)
- Pte. S. H. Clarke, Suffolk Reg. (Ipswich)
- Gnr. T. Clarke, Royal Field Arty. (Tipton)
- Pte. T. W. Clarke, Royal Scots (Rotherham)
- Cpl. W. Clarke, Army Service Corps (Stratford-on-Avon)
- Pte. W. Clarke, Coldstream Guards (Glazebury)
- Cpl. W. Clarke, Royal Field Arty. (Dunmow)
- L. Cpl. F. Clay, Devonshire Reg. (Southsea)
- Pte. A. Clayton, Coldstream Guards (Wakefield)
- Pte. W. G. Cleeve, Hampshire Reg. (Bishop Waltham)
- Dvr. W. H. Cleaver, Royal Field Arty. (Bow, London)
- Cpl. F. M. Clegg, Coldstream Guards (Eastrickley)
- Pte. H. Clegg, Grenadier Guards (Accrington)
- Pte. F. W. Clements, York & Lancaster Reg. (Walkley)
- Sgt. A. Cliff, Lincolnshire Reg. (Lincoln)
- Pte. W. Cliff, RAMC (Barnsley)
- Cpl. C. G. Clifford, Royal Engineers (Mickley)
- Pte. G. Clifton, Royal West Kent Reg. (Holesworth)
- Bombr. F. T. Clinch, Royal Field Arty. (Brentford)
- Pte. J. Chapman, Border Reg. (Keswick)
- Pte. J. Clough, Northumberland Fusiliers (Low Walker)
- Pte. A. W. Clow, Suffolk Reg. (Holbrook)
- Pte. V. A. Clow, Devonshire Reg. (Exeter)
- Pte. W. D. Clowes, Nottinghamshire and Derbyshire Reg. (Sutton-in-Ashfield)
- Sgt. T. Cobner, Labour Corps (Pontnewydd, Mon.)
- Pte. A. H. F. Cochrane, Gordon Highlanders (Irvine)
- Pte. W. Cochrane, Gordon Highlanders (Dundee)
- Pte. J. J. Coffey, Yorkshire Light Inf. (South Elmsall)
- Dvr. S. Cohen, Royal Field Arty. (Shoreditch, London)
- Pte. N. C. Cole, West Riding Reg. (Mossley) (Chesterfield)
- Pte. T. Collier, Manchester Reg. (Failsworth)
- Pte. F. P. L. Coles, Hampshire Reg. (North Waltham)
- Bombr. W. H. Coles, Royal Field Arty. (Northampton)
- Dvr. J. Christie, Royal Field Arty. (Saltcoats, N.B.)
- Pte. E. College, Yorkshire Reg. (Murton Colliery)
- Spr. W. J. Collett, Royal Engineers (Burton-on-Trent)
- L. Cpl. H. J. Collier, Nottinghamshire and Derbyshire Reg. (Uttoxeter)
- Pte. T. W. Collier, Royal Scots (New Zealand)
- Pte. T. Collier, Manchester Reg. (Failsworth)
- Pte. J. Collins, Devonshire Reg. (Barnstaple)
- Pte. T. Collier, Coldstream Guards (Tonge Moor)
- Capt. C. H. Colls, Northumberland Fusiliers (Stechford)
- L. Cpl. J. Collins, South Staffordshire Reg. (Wolverhampton)
- Act. Sgt. A. F. Connelly, Machine Gun Corps (Shoreditch)
- L. Cpl. C. Connolly, Royal Engineers (Omagh)
- Sgt. J. Connelly, Argyll and Sutherland Highlanders (Greenock)
- Pte. S. Constable, Worcestershire Reg. (Willenhall)
- Pte. H. Constantine, Yorkshire Light Inf. (Sheffield)
- Cpl. T. Constantine, West Riding Reg. (Clapham)
- Sgt. M. Conway, Worcestershire Reg. (Kidderminster)
- Sgt. T. Conway, York & Lancaster Reg. (Sheffield)
- Dvr. A. A. Cook, Royal Field Arty. (Plumstead, London)
- Pte. E. Cook, Honourable Arty. Company (Chelsea)
- Pte. T. Cook, Durham Light Inf. (Wingate)
- Sgt. T. Cooke, Royal Field Arty. (Eastbridge)
- Cpl. W. Coombs, Royal Field Arty. (Old Kent Road, London)
- Gnr. A. Cooper, Royal Field Arty. (Darwen)
- Pte. A. A. Cooper, Royal Warwickshire Reg. (Avon Dasset)
- Pte. M. F. Cooper, RAMC (Ramsgate)
- L. Cpl. R. J. Cooper, RAMC (Leeds)
- Cpl. T. Cooper, Machine Gun Corps (Holbeck)
- Sgt. R. Cooper, Hampshire Reg. (Winkfield)
- Sgt. W. C. Cooper, Royal Engineers (Brading, Isle of Wight)
- Cpl. W. H. Cooper, Royal Engineers (Blackburn)
- Sgt. A. R. Cordingley, Royal Lancaster Reg. (Chatham)
- Cpl. H. Cordwell, Border Reg. (Manchester)
- Pte. F. Corker, Cheshire Reg. (Northwich)
- Pte. G. Cormack, Seaforth Highlanders (Alness)
- Gnr. C. Corrigan, Royal Garrison Arty. (Wexford)
- Pte. F. Cosgrove, Cameron Highlanders (Dundee)
- Spr. H. Cosgrove, Royal Engineers (Morestead)
- Dvr. M. Costello, Royal Field Arty. (E. Dublin)
- Pte. E. Coulton, Grenadier Guards (Lower Ince)
- Pte. J. Cowell, Labour Corps (East Ham, London)
- Pte. W. Cowlard, Royal West Surrey Reg. (Oxted)
- Sgt. J. Cowles, South Staffordshire Reg. (West Bromwich)
- Sgt. A. L. Cox, Grenadier Guards (London)
- Pte. E. H. Cox, Suffolk Reg. (Outwell)
- Gnr. P. S. Cox, Royal Garrison Arty. (Ashby-de-la-Zouch)
- Pte. W. Cox, Leicestershire Reg. (Leicester)
- Gnr. J. Coyle, Royal Field Arty. (Southampton)
- L. Cpl. G. E. Crack, Royal Engineers (Harrow)
- Dvr. G. F. Cracknell, Royal Field Arty. (Kilburn, London)
- Sgt. C. T. Craddock, South Staffordshire Reg. (Walsall)
- Cpl. P. Craig, Royal Highlanders (Pirnmill, Arran)
- Pte. A. Craik, Royal Highlanders (Brechin)
- L. Cpl. C. W. Craker, Yorkshire Reg. (Leeds)
- Pte. M. Crampton, West Riding Reg. (Golcar)
- Bombr. H. Cranham, Royal Field Arty. (Liverpool)
- Dvr. J. Crawford, Royal Field Arty. (Edinburgh)
- Pte. H. S. Cribb, Northumberland Fusiliers (Fishbourne)
- Cpl. R. Cristie, RAMC (Glasgow)
- Pte. R. J. E. Crosland, RAMC (Todmorden)
- Sgt. W. F. Cross, Royal Field Arty. (Walworth, S.B.)
- Dvr. A. E. Cross, Royal Field Arty. (Battersea, London)
- L. Cpl. G. E. Crouchen, Machine Gun Corps (Fritton)
- L. Cpl. W. H. Croucher, Royal Engineers (Dartford)
- Pte. J. Cruickshanks, Royal Scots (Edinburgh)
- Sgt. F. Cryer, West Riding Reg. (Keighley)
- Pte. R. Cude, East Kent Reg. (Wandsworth, London)
- Pte. A. Culley, West Yorkshire Reg. (Leeds)
- Bombr. W. Cummings, Royal Field Arty. (Seaton Delaval)
- L. Cpl. S. Cunliffe, Machine Gun Corps (Eagley)
- Spr. F. W. Cunningham, Royal Engineers (Sheffield)
- Spr. J. A. Cunningham, Royal Engineers (Willesden, London)
- Sgt. R. Curry, Machine Gun Guards (Hemsworth)
- Pte. B. A. Curtis, Norfolk Reg. (Beccles)
- Pte. T. R. Curtis, Lincolnshire Reg. (Lincoln)
- Pte. W. G. Curtis, Royal Warwickshire Reg. (Beachampton)
- Sgt. W. Cusack, Nottinghamshire and Derbyshire Reg. (Manchester)
- Gnr. W. J. Cutler, Royal Field Arty. (King's Heath)
- Pte. E. D. Cutts, Norfolk Reg. (Fakenham)
- Sgt. F. H. D. Dack, Norfolk Reg. (Nordelph)
- Pte. M. K. Dady, Royal Warwickshire Reg. (Wendover)
- Pte. R. Daglish, Durham Light Inf. (Lancaster)
- Pte. J. Dakin, Shropshire Light Inf. (Maccleefield)
- L. Cpl. H. Daley, Seaforth Highlanders (Manchester)
- Bombr. R. S. Dalley, Royal Field Arty. (Northam)
- Gnr. J. Daly, Royal Garrison Arty. (Cork)
- Gnr. P. Darcy, Royal Field Arty. (Higginstown)
- Spr. H. J. Davenport, Royal Engineers (Thronford)
- Sgt. J. Davenport, Royal Warwickshire Reg. (Aston)
- Pte. W. A. Davey, Lincolnshire Reg. (Appleby)
- Sgt. R. Davidson, Gordon Highlanders (Peterculter)
- Gnr. W. S. Davidson, Royal Field Arty. (Edinburgh)
- Sgt. R. Davie, Royal Scots (Edinburgh)
- Pte. A. Davies, Lancashire Fusiliers (Bolton)
- Pte. G. Davies, Hampshire Reg. (Wolverhampton)
- Pte. J. Davies, Shropshire Light Inf. (Cleobury Mortimer)
- L. Sgt. B. Davis, Royal West Kent Reg. (Poplar)
- Spr. B. H. Davis, Royal Engineers (Tewkesbury)
- Pte. W. E. Davison, T. R. Battalion, attd. Machine Gun Corps (South Emsall)
- Pte. C. J. Dawes, Royal Sussex Reg. (Hertford)
- Sgt. T. W. Dawson, Royal Garrison Arty. (New Shieldon)
- L. Cpl. S. W. Day, Suffolk Reg. (Ipswich)
- Pte. J. Dean, Liverpool Reg. (Short Heath)
- Pte. R. H. Dean, Grenadier Guards (Hanley, Staffs.)
- L. Cpl. V. E. T. Deeprose, Royal Sussex Reg. (Westham)
- Gnr. C. T. Deighton, Royal Garrison Arty. (Birmingham)
- Dvr. F. Dellow, Royal Field Arty. (Barkway)
- Dvr. R. Dempster, Royal Field Arty. (Port Glasgow)
- Cpl. E. Denison, Yorkshire Reg. (Leeds)
- L. Cpl. M. S. S. Dennett, Royal Sussex Reg. (Eastbourne)
- Sgt. T. K. Dennis, Leicestershire Reg. (Donisthorpe)
- Gnr. P. C. Desborough, Royal Garrison Arty. (Burton-Laysars)
- Sgt. A. Dey, King's Own Scottish Borderers (E. Aberdeen)
- Pte. S. E. Dicken, Leicestershire Reg. (Leicester)
- Pte. J. Dickenson, Northumberland Fusiliers (Lemington-on-Tyne)
- L. Cpl. J. Dickie, Argyll and Sutherland Highlanders (Penicuik)
- Sgt. G. Dickson, Seaforth Highlanders (Edinburgh)
- Gnr. G. L. Diggins, Royal Field Arty. (Kilburn, London)
- L. Cpl. A. Dignam, Royal Engineers (Manchester)
- Pte. J. Dillon, King's Own Scottish Borderers (Coatbridge)
- L. Cpl. F. Dinnage, Machine Gun Corps. (Hurstpierpoint)
- Pte. A. W. Dix, Royal West Surrey Reg. (Pangbourne)
- L. Cpl. M. Dixon, Shropshire Light Inf. (Gelli Rhondda)
- Act. Cpl. R. Dixon, Lancashire Fusiliers (Heywood)
- Pte. T. A. Dixon, Suffolk Reg. (Rivershead)
- L. Cpl. V. Dixon, West Riding Reg. (Haworth)
- Pte. H. Dobbs, Coldstream Guards (Dronfield)
- Cpl. Wheeler E. Dobson, Royal Field Arty. (Tyne Dock)
- Pte. F. Docherty, West Riding Reg. (Halifax)
- Spr. W. G. Dodd, Royal Engineers (Lavendon)
- Pte. W. Dodds, Seaforth Highlanders (Edinburgh)
- L. Cpl. W. Dodds, Durham Light Inf. (Gateshead)
- S. Smith Cpl. W. B. Dodds, Royal Field Arty. (Gateshead)
- Pte. G. E. Doe, Royal West Kent Reg. (Redgrave, Diss)
- Pte. C. Doherty, Irish Guards (Derrybeg)
- Pte. H. Doherty, RAMC (Bolton)
- Sgt. H. Dolby, Royal Engineers (Peterboro)
- Pte. W. Donaldson, Gordon Highlanders (Montrose)
- Pte. A. E. Donbavand, Shropshire Light Inf. (Stockport)
- Bombr. H. Donbavand, Royal Field Arty. (Stockport)
- L. Cpl. J. Donelly, Royal Scots (Bellsquarry, Calder)
- Dvr. D. Donkin, Royal Engineers (Newbigg-in-by-Sea)
- Pte. J. Donnelly, RAMC (Arklow)
- Pte. J. Donoghue, Devonshire Reg. (Castleton)
- Pte. J. Doolan, Irish Guards (Tullow, County Carlow)
- Pte. F. D. Douglas, Army Cyclist Corps (Bideford)
- Dvr. L. A. Doust, Royal Field Arty. (Westcliffe-on-Sea)
- Gnr. L. J. Doust, Royal Garrison Arty. (Witton, Birmingham)
- Pnr. W. Dowding, Royal Engineers (E. Bath)
- Pte. T. Downes, Leicestershire Reg. (Market Harborough)
- Dvr. W. Downey, Royal Field Arty. (Athy)
- Pte. G. G. Downs, York & Lancaster Reg. (Hull)
- Cpl. R. C. Doyle, Honourable Arty. Company (Trinidad)
- L. Cpl. F. J. Draper, Devonshire Reg. (Stratton St. Margaret)
- L. Sgt. E. Drew, Machine Gun Corps (Cheltenham)
- Pte. G. Drew, Devonshire Reg. (Gittisham)
- Pte. P. Drinkwater, Grenadier Guards (Llangarren)
- Pte. J. Duff, Irish Guards (Skerries)
- Sgt. E. Duffy, Liverpool Reg. (Manchester)
- Pte. J. Duke, York & Lancaster Reg. (Rotherham)
- L. Cpl. R. Duke, Duke of Cornwall's Light Inf. (Stonehouse)
- Cpl. J. F. Duley, Royal Field Arty. (Midhurst)
- Cpl. F. Duncan, Royal Engineers (Tayport)
- Pte. H. Dunkley, Royal West Surrey Reg. (Towcester)
- Cpl. G. Dunn, Yorkshire Reg., attd. Trench Mortar Battery (Ferryhill)
- Pte. H. Dunn, North Staffordshire Reg. (Hanley)
- Cpl. C. Dunning, South Wales Borderers (Nantyglo, Mon.)
- Pte. J. Dunningham, Royal Sussex Reg. (W. Bergholt)
- Sgt. J. A. Dunsmore, Argyll and Sutherland Highlanders (Castlecary)
- 2nd Cpl. P. C. Durnford, Royal Engineers (Birkenhead)
- Pte. A. Dutiton, Royal Welsh Fusiliers (Blackburn)
- Cpl. A. Duxbury, Manchester Reg. (Blackpool)
- Pte. L. Cpl. G. Dyker, Gordon Highlanders (Auchendoer)
- Sgt. W. Eager, Royal Engineers (Llandudno)
- Pte. R. Eastwood, Royal Lancaster Reg. (Stacksteads)
- Pte. A. Easy, Suffolk Reg. (Downham Fen, Isle of Ely.)
- Pte. T. Edgar, Northumberland Fusiliers (Usworth)
- Sgt. J. Edge, Royal Welsh Fusiliers (Birkenhead)
- Pte. A. G. Edwards, Durham Light Inf. (Petersfield)
- Pte. G. R. Edwards, South Staffordshire Reg. (Penkridge)
- Cpl. H. J. Edwards, Royal Field Arty. (E. Dorchester)
- Pte. R. Edwards, Liverpool Reg. (Liverpool)
- L. Cpl. T. Eccles, Royal Lancaster Reg. (Skerton)
- L. Cpl. W. Eley, Nottinghamshire and Derbyshire Reg. (Nottingham)
- Sgt. H. F. Ellen, Royal Engineers (Tufnell Park)
- L. Cpl. J. Elliot, Royal Engineers (Edinburgh)
- Dvr. C. C. E. Elliott, Royal Field Arty. (Doncaster)
- L. Cpl. C. Ellis, Essex Reg. (Westcliff)
- Dvr. C. V. Ellis, Royal Field Arty. (Tottenham)
- Cpl. F. B. Ellis, Northamptonshire Reg. (Kettering)
- Pte. H. E. Ellis, Royal Welsh Fusiliers (Hyde)
- Sgt. J. Ellis, East Yorkshire Reg. (Bridlington)
- Sgt. L. Ellis, King's Royal Rifle Corps (Stoke-on-Trent)
- Pte. J. Ellwood, Bedfordshire Reg. (Cambridge)
- L. Cpl. W. Elphick, Royal Sussex Reg. (Herstmonceux)
- L. Cpl. E. E. Emery, Military Foot Police (South-sea)
- Dvr. E. England, Royal Field Arty. (Allerton by Water)
- Pte. R. A. England, Grenadier Guards (West Buckland)
- Pte. F. Entwistle, RAMC (Oswaldtwistle)
- L. Cpl. D. L. Evans, Royal Engineers (Southport)
- Pte. E. J. Evans, Dorsetshire Reg. (Walsall)
- Sgt. H. H. Evans, Royal Field Arty. (Newport, Mon.)
- Pte. H. S. Evans, Royal Welsh Fusiliers (Ruabon)
- Sgt. H. V. Evans, West Yorkshire Reg. (Fenton)
- L. Cpl. J. L. Evans, Royal Engineers (Caerphilly)
- Pte. R. W. Evans, Liverpool Reg. (Port Dinorwic)
- Pte. S. Evans, Gloucestershire Reg. (Dumbleton)
- Dvr. S. Evans, Royal Field Arty. (Bangor)
- Sgt. S. E. Evans, Worcestershire Reg. (Birmingham)
- Pte. T. Evans, Cheshire Reg. (Middlesbrough)
- Pte. T. H. Evans, Irish Guards (Hammersmith, London)
- Sgt. W. Evans, Lancashire Fusiliers (E. Chesterfield)
- Gnr. W. Evans, Royal Field Arty. (Ontario, Canada)
- Sgt. W. Evans, Royal Warwickshire Reg. (Westanstowe)
- Sgt. R. C. Everett, Royal Field Arty. (Alderford)
- Sgt. R. C. Ewell, Grenadier Guards (Putney, London)
- Pte. G. A. Extall, King's Royal Rifle Corps (Arnold)
- Pte. C. P. Eyles, Devonshire Reg. (Walworth, London)
- Sgt. F. Fairclough, Royal Field Arty. (Darwen)
- Cpl. J. Farley, Labour Corps (Bingley)
- Cpl. I. H. Farmer, Royal Sussex Reg. (Heathfield)
- Pte. J. W. Farmery, Gordon Highlanders (Buttershaw)
- Cpl. A. W. Farr, Hampshire Reg. (Bournemouth)
- L. Cpl. W. Farrow, Leicestershire Reg. (Nelson)
- Pte. B. Faulkner, Royal Sussex Reg. (Upton)
- Pte. S. Fearn, RAMC (Birmingham)
- Pte. J. Feeney, Lancashire Fusiliers (Burnley)
- Cpl. G. F. Fellows, Royal Field Arty. (Handsworth)
- Cpl. H. C. Fells, Machine Gun Corps (Crofton Park)
- Pte. I. Fells, Duke of Cornwall's Light Inf. (London)
- Sgt. H. G. Fenemore, Machine Gun Corps (Penge)
- Pte. E. Fenwick, Yorkshire Light Inf. (York)
- Dvr. W. G. Ferry, Royal Field Arty. (Bethnal Green, London)
- Pte. F. Fever, Royal West Kent Reg. (Maidstone)
- Sgt. C. W. Fewell, Machine Gun Corps (Chelmsford)
- Pte. C. F. Field, RAMC (Horeham)
- Pte. E. Field, West Riding Reg. (Huddersfield)
- Pte. H. Field, West Riding Reg. (Huddersfield)
- Dvr. G. Y. Firth, Royal Field Arty. (Newton Heath)
- Dvr. R. Fisher, Royal Field Arty. (Bridgefoot)
- Pte. T. H. Fisher, Worcestershire Reg. (Cleeve)
- Pte. S. G. Fitch, Grenadier Guards (Great Wakering)
- Pte. M. J. Fitzgerald, Irish Guards (Kilteely, County Limerick)
- Pte. J. Flaherty, North Staffordshire Reg. (Batley)
- Pte. F. Fleming, Machine Gun Guards (Salisbury)
- Dvr. G. T. Fleming, Royal Field Arty. (Sunderland)
- Pte. J. Fleming, Argyll and Sutherland Highlanders (Glen Craig)
- Sgt. N. Fleming, Royal Engineers (Newcastle upon Tyne)
- Pte. J. Fletcher, Royal Welsh Fusiliers (E. Whitehall)
- Pte. J. W. Fletcher, Lincolnshire Reg. (Crowland)
- Sgt. S. Flitcroft, West Riding Reg. (Halifax)
- L. Sgt. E. Flynn, East Surrey Reg. (Streatham)
- Pte. J. C. Foale, Devonshire Reg. (Plymouth)
- Cpl. T. Fogarty, Machine Gun Corps (Urlingford)
- L. Cpl. A. Forbes, Gordon Highlanders (Aberdeen)
- Pte. A. Ford, East Surrey Reg. (Ringwood)
- Sgt. A. Ford, Royal Field Arty. (Portsmouth)
- L. Cpl. R. H. Ford, Nottinghamshire and Derbyshire Reg. (Shardlow)
- L. Cpl. A. Fordham, Suffolk Reg. (Cambridge)
- L. Cpl. E. J. Foreman, Lancashire Fusiliers (Stockton-on-Tees)
- Spr. J. Forrest, Royal Engineers (Edinburgh)
- Pte. R. Forster, Coldstream Guards (Bridport)
- Pte. J. Forsyth, King's Own Scottish Borderers (Coatbridge)
- Dvr. F. Foster, Royal Field Arty. (E. Norbury)
- Pte. H. S. Foster, RAMC (Wood Green)
- Cpl. J. Foster, Royal Field Arty. (New Cleethorpes)
- Sgt. W. Foster, West Riding Reg. (Oldham)
- Pte. A. Fotheringham, Royal Scots Fusiliers (Perth)
- Gnr. A. Foulkes, Royal Field Arty. (Four Crosses)
- Pte. T. Foulkes, Machine Gun Corps (Hulme)
- L. Cpl. C. Fowler, Royal Sussex Reg. (Brighton)
- Cpl. W. Fowler, Hertfordshire Reg. (Hemel Hempstead)
- Pte. R. J. Fox, Royal Scots (E. Everton)
- Pte. T. Fox, Manchester Reg. (Heywood)
- Cpl. W. Foy, Argyll and Sutherland Highlanders (Kirkintilloch)
- Sgt. E. A. Framp, London Reg. (East Dulwich)
- Pte. W. L. Francis, RAMC (Woodford)
- Pte. F. Frank, RAMC (Hull)
- Pte. T. Frankum, South Staffordshire Reg. (Reading)
- L. Cpl. E. Fredricksen, West Riding Reg. (Keighley)
- Spr. F. Freeman, Royal Engineers (Camberwell)
- L. Cpl. H. A. French, RAMC (Ashburton)
- Pte. R. W. French, Northumberland Fusiliers (Trimdon Grange)
- Pte. E. Frost, West Riding Reg. (Bradford)
- Pte. F. Frost, West Riding Reg. (East Dereham)
- Cpl. G. Frost, Royal Field Arty. (Norwich)
- Pte. J. T. Frost, Leicestershire Reg. (Northampton)
- Sgt. R. J. Frost, Hampshire Reg. (Alton)
- Spr. R. J. Fry, Royal Engineers (Plymouth)
- Pte. M. Furlong, Irish Guards (Killinick)
- Pte. Petty Ofc. C. Furze, East Surrey Reg. (Lambeth, London)
- Pte. H. W. Gaby, Lancashire Fusiliers (Edgware Road, London)
- Sgt. S. Gaines, Royal Field Arty. (Ilkley)
- Pte. J. Galbraith, Royal Scots Fusiliers (Ayr)
- Pte. A. Galer, A.B.C. (Paddington)
- Pte. B. W. Gallop, Royal West Surrey Reg. (Horfield)
- Cpl. J. W. Gamble, Yorkshire Reg. (Guisboro-Cleveland)
- Pte. J. Gardiner, Lancashire Fusiliers (Blackburn)
- Cpl. F. Gardner, RAMC (W. Kensington)
- L. Cpl. W. Gardner, Royal Welsh Fusiliers (Birmingham)
- Pte. C. Garland, Royal Warwickshire Reg. (Stourbridge)
- L. Cpl. J. Garland, Lincolnshire Reg. (Sutton-on-Trent)
- Spr. J. Garner, Royal Engineers (Fennoy)
- Dvr. W. Garner, Royal Field Arty. (Leicester)
- Pte. G. F. Garratt, Nottinghamshire and Derbyshire Reg. (Derby)
- Pte. H. Garratt, Royal Warwickshire Reg. (Atherstone)
- Cpl. C. R. Garrett, RAMC (Eastleigh)
- Pte. J. Gaskell, Lancashire Fusiliers (Middleton Junction)
- Cpl. H. Gasson, Royal Engineers (St. Leonards-on-Sea)
- L. Cpl. J. R. Gates, South Staffordshire Reg. (Hednesford)
- Cpl. W. J. Gates, Royal Field Arty. (Kentish Town, London)
- Act. Bombr. D. H. Gavin, Royal Field Arty. (Birmingham)
- Sgt. J. W. Gaze, Leicestershire Reg. (Rearsby)
- Cpl. H. J. Geary, Machine Gun Corps (Farnboro)
- Pte. W. Geary, Middlesex Reg. (Ringwood)
- Pte. H. Gee, Nottinghamshire and Derbyshire Reg. (Staveley)
- Cpl. H. T. Geere, Royal Engineers (Hove)
- Pte. H. Geeves, Nottinghamshire and Derbyshire Reg. (Houghton)
- L. Cpl. J. S. Gelling, Royal Engineers (Onsham, Isle of Man)
- Gnr. C. H. George, Royal Garrison Arty. (Birmingham)
- Dvr. H. Gething, Royal Field Arty. (Brixton Hill, London)
- Pte. G. Gibb, Leicestershire Reg. (Nuneaton)
- Gnr. E. Gibberd, Royal Field Arty. (Bournemouth)
- Sgt. F. Gibbs, Machine Gun Corps (Ampthill)
- Sgt. E. Gibson, Royal Engineers (Birmingham)
- Sgt. J. Gibson, Royal Field Arty. (Keighley)
- Gnr. W. H. Gibson, Royal Garrison Arty. (Bedlington)
- L. Cpl. D. Gilfillan, Argyll and Sutherland Highlanders (St. Ninians)
- Sgt. A. Gill, Royal Field Arty. (Hull)
- Pte. A. Gill, Cheshire Reg. (Stockport)
- Dvr. W. E. Gill, Royal Field Arty. (Burnley)
- Pte. J. Gillan, Yorkshire Reg. (North (Ormesby)
- Cpl. M. Given, Nottinghamshire and Derbyshire Reg. (Nottingham)
- Cpl. D. Gladwell, Royal Field Arty. (East Ham)
- Tpr. W. A. Glass, Household Battalion (Acton)
- Sgt. A. Glaze, Royal West Surrey Reg. (Croydon)
- Sgt. E. Gledhill, York & Lancaster Reg. (Pogmoor)
- Act. Cpl. J. Glen, Royal West Kent Reg. (Beckenham)
- Pte. W. Glen, Seaforth Highlanders (Arbroath)
- Pte. J. G. Godden, Royal West Kent Reg. (Edmonton)
- Spr. W. E. Godfrey, Royal Engineers (Bristol)
- Pte. W. H. Godfrey, Royal Warwickshire Reg., attd. Machine Gun Company (Fulham, London)
- Gnr. W. H. J. Godfrey, Royal Field Arty. (S. Woodford)
- Sgt. S. F. Godley, Royal Field Arty. (Peckham)
- Pte. C. E. Golden, RAMC (Homefield)
- Pte. E. Golding, Military Foot Police (Bensham)
- Cpl. C. Goldsby, Royal Field Arty. (Birmingham)
- Pte. T. G. Goldsmith, Army Cyclist Corps (Tufnell Park)
- Pte. E. Gomme, Gloucestershire Reg. (Gravesend)
- L. Cpl. W. G. Goodacre, Rifle Brigade (Stapleford)
- L. Cpl. J. Goodenough, Royal Berkshire Reg. (Wallingford)
- Pte. A. Gooderham, Suffolk Reg. (Bury St. Edmunds)
- Spr. C. W. Goodridge, Royal Engineers (Salisbury)
- Dvr. S. W. Goodyer, Royal Field Arty. (Islington, London)
- Pte. M. N. Goold, Army Service Corps (Worcester, U.S.A.)
- Sgt. T. R. Goring, Royal Field Arty. (Clapton, London)
- Dvr. A. Gorman, Royal Field Arty. (Plumstead, London)
- Pte. F. Gough, Machine Gun Corps (South-Molton)
- L. Sgt. P. J. Goult, Honourable Arty. Company (Wanstead)
- Gnr. J. Goward, Royal Field Arty. (New Tredegar)
- L. Sgt. A. C. Grabham, Devonshire Reg. (Tylorstown)
- Pte. M. Grace, Royal West Surrey Reg. (Nenagh)
- Pte. H. Graham, West Riding Reg. (Huddersfield)
- Sgt. T. Grain, Royal Garrison Arty. (London)
- Sgt. E. Grainger, Coldstream Guards (Tadby)
- Sgt. R. Grange, Royal Engineers (Ballyclare)
- Pte. J. Grant, West Yorkshire Reg. (Leeds)
- Sgt. M. Grant, Cameron Highlanders (Edinburgh)
- Pte. T. Graves, Highland Light Inf. (Govan)
- Cpl. A. Gray, Royal Field Arty. (Glasgow)
- Pte. C. S. Gray, Royal Warwickshire Reg. (Rochdale)
- L. Cpl. H. A. Gray, King's Royal Rifle Corps (Canning Town)
- Petty Ofc. R. A. Gray, Royal Naval Volunteer Reserve (Gateshead-on-Tyne)
- Cpl. S. G. Gray, Royal West Kent Reg. (Battersea)
- Sgt. W. Gray, Royal Scots Fusiliers (Beith)
- Cpl. A. Green, Gloucestershire Reg. (Bromyard)
- Pte. C. H. Green, Coldstream Guards (Gillingham)
- Cpl. E. Green, East Surrey Reg. (Chorley Wood)
- Gnr. G. Green, Royal Field Arty. (Dover)
- Pte. G. Green, West Riding Reg. (Brierley Hill)
- Cpl. H. Green, York & Lancaster Reg. (Rotherham)
- Bombr. P. Green, Royal Garrison Arty. (Cardiff)
- Pte. T. A. Green, Lincolnshire Reg. (Leicester)
- Pte. W. E. Green, Yorkshire Light Inf. (Normanton)
- Cpl. W. H. Green, Northamptonshire Reg. (Rothwell)
- Pte. J. Greenlaw, Durham Light Inf. (New Washington)
- Spr. F. Greenwood, Royal Engineers (Hawksclough)
- Gnr. W. Greenwood, Royal Garrison Arty. (Burnley)
- Dvr. H. Gregg, Royal Field Arty. (Bethnal Green)
- Gnr. L. L. Gregory, Royal Field Arty. (West Croydon)
- Pte. T. Gregson, Liverpool Reg. (Saskatchewan)
- Cpl. A. Grieve, King's Own Scottish Borderers (Auchtermuchty)
- Pte. D. Grieve, King's Own Scottish Borderers (Glasgow)
- Pte. W. Grieve, Gordon Highlanders (Motherwell)
- Pte. E. Griffin, Machine Gun Corps (E. Bedminster)
- 2nd Cpl. E. A. Griffin, Royal Engineers (Greet)
- Sgt. W. Grimes, King's Own Scottish Borderers (Lancaster)
- Pte. H. Grindley, Grenadier Guards (Tarvin)
- L. Cpl. W. R. Grose, Devonshire Reg. (St. Austell)
- Pte. J. W. Grundy, Hampshire Reg. (Walsall)
- Pte. J. T. Guest, Liverpool Reg. (Dudley)
- L. Cpl. G. H. Guildford, Royal Sussex Reg. (Brighton)
- Dvr. J. A. Gulley, Royal Field Arty. (Dewsbury)
- Cpl. J. Gunter, Royal Warwickshire Reg. (Bristol)
- Sgt. A. H. Gunton, Royal Engineers (Queens Park, London)
- Cpl. F. W. Gurr, London Reg. (Clapham)
- Pte. A. Guthrie, Northumberland Fusiliers (Walker-on-Tyne)
- L. Cpl. R. Guttridge, Royal Sussex Reg. (Hastings)
- Cpl. G. T. Gwilt, RAMC (Wolverhampton)
- Pte. A. Hadcroft, Coldstream Guards (Haslingden)
- Sgt. W. G. Hagger, Royal Field Arty. (Bromley, London)
- Sgt. A. Hall, Royal Field Arty. (Southwark, London)
- Gnr. J. R. Hall, Royal Garrison Arty. (Birmingham)
- Pte. J. T. Hall, Machine Gun Corps (Shoppington)
- Pte. N. A. Hall, West Yorkshire Reg. (King's Cross, London)
- Sgt. R. W. Hall, York & Lancaster Reg. (Washington)
- Pte. T. Hall, South Staffordshire Reg., attd. Royal Engineers (Wednesbury)
- L. Cpl. L. A. Halladay, Royal Warwickshire Reg. (Balsall Heath)
- Pte. A. Halliwell, RAMC (Ince)
- Pte. G. Halsey, Bedfordshire Reg. (Hemel Hempstead)
- Dvr. H. Halstead, Royal Field Arty. (Birstall)
- Pte. J. Hamilton, Gordon Highlanders (Uddingston)
- Pte. W. Hammond, Lancashire Fusiliers (Leeds)
- 2nd Cpl. H. Hampson, Royal Engineers (Manchester)
- Cpl. W. H. Hance, Shropshire Light Inf. (Tooting)
- Pte. C. Hankin, Army Service Corps (Farningham)
- Spr. J. Hardie, Royal Engineers (Kintore)
- Pte. W. G. Hardiman, Middlesex Reg. (St. Pancras)
- Sgt. C. Harding, West Riding Reg. (Keighley)
- Dvr. C. R. Harding, Royal Field Arty. (Streatham, London)
- Sgt. J. Harding, Northumberland Fusiliers (Riding Mill)
- Gnr. T. H. Harding, Royal Field Arty. (Brockley, London)
- Pte. P. Hardisty, Seaforth Highlanders (New Milnes)
- Sgt. J. Hardwick, York & Lancaster Reg. (Hollinsend)
- Cpl. W. H. Hardy, Labour Corps (Mountsorrel)
- Pte. J. Harfield, Royal Warwickshire Reg. (Littlehampton)
- 2nd Cpl. G. E. Hargreaves, Royal Engineers (E. Preston)
- Spr. J. Harker, Royal Engineers (West Hartlepool)
- Cpl. G. Harkes, Royal Garrison Arty. (Dundee)
- Pte. W. J. Harmer, Essex Reg. (Kentish Town)
- L. Cpl. J. H. Harper, Duke of Cornwall's Light Inf. (St. Austell)
- Bombr. T. Harper, Royal Field Arty. (Wolverhampton)
- Sgt. H. F. Harpham, Nottinghamshire and Derbyshire Reg. (Selston)
- Cpl. of H. H. J. Harrington, Household Battalion (Uxbridge)
- Pte. A. C. M. Harris, Devonshire Reg. (Barn-staple)
- Cpl. C. Harris, Royal West Kent Reg. (Lewisham)
- Pte. G. E. Harris, Royal West Kent Reg. (Bermondsey)
- Cpl. T. Harris, Irish Guards (Paddington)
- Sgt. W. Harris, Royal Engineers (Manchester)
- Pte. W. Harris, Military Mounted Police (Walsall)
- Pte. W. R. Harris, Cheshire Reg. (Blackburn)
- Pte. A. Harrison, Nottinghamshire and Derbyshire Reg. (Hull)
- Drummer A. Harrison, Middlesex Reg. (Peckham)
- Sgt. C. G. Harrison, Dorsetshire Reg. (Poole)
- Pte. J. Harrison, Nottinghamshire and Derbyshire Reg. (Ashbourne)
- Sgt. W. Harrison, Royal Field Arty. (Leicester)
- Pte. H. Harrop, Lancashire Fusiliers (Whitefield)
- Act. Sgt. F. J. Hart, Royal West Kent Reg. (Sydenham)
- Pte. P. Hart, Border Reg. (Wigan)
- Pte. G. Hartle, Worcestershire Reg. (Bromsgrove)
- Spr. F. M. Hartley, Royal Engineers (Bradford)
- Pte. C. Hartshorne, Grenadier Guards (Alfreton)
- Pte. E. Hartshorne, Nottinghamshire and Derbyshire Reg. (Burton-on-Trent)
- Pte. D. Harvie, Scots Guards (Fauldhouse, N.B.)
- L. Sgt. J. Harvey, Royal Welsh Fusiliers (Birmingham)
- Pte. W. J. Harvey, Norfolk Reg. (Barnsbury)
- Spr. J. Haston, Royal Engineers (Shotts)
- Dvr. B. Hatch, Royal Field Arty. (Newcastle upon Tyne)
- Sgt. G. Hatchley, Royal West Kent Reg. (Pinner)
- Pte. H. Hawker, Devonshire Reg. (Axminster)
- Pte. B. Hawkins, Machine Gun Corps (Luton)
- Sgt. C. H. Hawkins, Leicestershire Reg. (Loughboro)
- Pte. D. C. Hawksby, Gordon Highlanders (Glasgow)
- Pte. F. Hawley, RAMC (Derby)
- Sgt. W. E. Haworth, Royal Field Arty. (Oswaldtwistle)
- Spr. W. H. Hawson, Royal Engineers (Shirebrook)
- Pte. G. Hay, Northumberland Fusiliers (Bedlington)
- 2nd Cpl. S. F. Hayes, Royal Engineers (South Shields)
- Pte. E. Haynes, RAMC (Hunsley)
- Pte. H. Haynes, South Staffordshire Reg. (West Bromwich)
- Pte. H. H. Haynes, RAMC (Godalming)
- Sgt. B. Hazle, West Riding Reg. (Halifax)
- Sgt. G. Head, Royal Garrison Arty. (Newbury)
- Sgt. T. Heal, Machine Gun Corps (Eastwood)
- Pte. A. Heaney, Army Cyclist Corps (Newcastle)
- L. Cpl. A. E. Hemming, Royal Warwickshire Reg. (Alcester)
- Sgt. W. C. Hender, Royal Field Arty. (Liverpool)
- Spr. A. Henderson, Royal Engineers (Harrogate)
- Pte. D. Henderson, Royal Warwickshire Reg. (West Calder)
- Pte. B. Henderson, Royal Highlanders (Buckhaven)
- Pte. T. Henderson, RAMC (Dundee)
- Gnr. W. Hepplewhite, Royal Field Arty. (S. Shields)
- Bombr. J. Herbert, Royal Field Arty. (Pimlico, London)
- Dvr. A. V. E. Herrich, Royal Field Arty. (West Ham)
- Sgt. W. Hewitt, Machine Gun Corps (Ferryhill)
- Act. L. Cpl. G. Heydenrick, Machine Gun Corps (Cape Town, South African)
- Pte. H. T. Heyward, Devonshire Reg. (Tiverton)
- Pte. J. L. Higgins, Devonshire Reg. (S. Hackney)
- 2nd Cpl. H. High, Royal Engineers (Ashford, Middlesex)
- Cpl. C. Highton, East Yorkshire Reg. (HuB)
- Pte. J. H. Higson, Border Reg. (Leigh)
- Pte. C. Hill, Suffolk Reg. (Bredfield)
- Pte. E. Hill, Manchester Reg., attd. Light Trench Mortar Battery (St. Helens)
- Pte. J. Hill, Northumberland Fusiliers (Newcastle)
- Sgt. B. M. Hill, Grenadier Guards (Nottingham)
- Sgt. T. H. Hill, Royal Field Arty. (Selby Park)
- Cpl. W. Hill, Royal Field Arty. (Pliuastead, London)
- Cpl. F. W. Hillman, Cheshire Reg. (Aspull)
- Pte. B. Hilton, Border Reg. (Heaton Park)
- Pte. S. Hincks, Leicestershire Reg. (Leicester)
- Sgt. W. Hindley, Grenadier Guards (Leigh)
- Pte. A. E. Hindrey, Norfolk Reg. (Norwich)
- Pte. F. Hinkler, York & Lancaster Reg. (Sheffield)
- L. Cpl. H. Hinkley, Nottinghamshire and Derbyshire Reg. (Duffield)
- Cpl. H. Hinton, Royal Garrison Arty. (Birmingham)
- Sgt. A. P. Hipkin, York & Lancaster Reg. (Beeston)
- L. Cpl. J. W. Hird, West Yorkshire Reg. (Leeds)
- Pte. W. B. Hirst, West Riding Reg. (Bradford)
- L. Cpl. W. Hobbs, Hampshire Reg. (Bassett)
- Pte. G. Hobden, Lancashire Fusiliers (Clapton Park)
- Pte. A. E. Hobson, Northumberland Fusiliers (Hornsea)
- Pte. L. Hodgson, Yorkshire Reg. (Danby)
- Pte. S. Hodkinson, Shropshire Light Inf. (Stockport)
- Cpl. H. Hodson, Royal Engineers (Willesden)
- Sgt. H. JB. Hogg, RAMC (Croydon)
- Dvr. D. Hogwood, Royal Field Arty. (Maze Pond, London)
- Pnr. H. Holbroofe, Royal Engineers (Wakefield)
- Dvr. G. Holden, Royal Field Arty. (Darwen)
- Pte. T. Holden, Coldstream Guards (Nelson)
- Pte. W. H. Holden, Royal Welsh Fusiliers (Blackburn)
- Pte. C. Holland, Gloucestershire Reg. (Leyton)
- Dvr. T. H. Holla, Royal Field Arty. (Greetland)
- Pte. F. J. Hollier, RAMC (Bristol)
- L. Sgt. J. Hollis, Royal Welsh Fusiliers (Liverpool)
- Pte. B. H. Holloway, Royal Warwickshire Reg. (Alford)
- Cpl. A. G. Hollyoake, Oxfordshire & Buckinghamshire Light Inf. (Stony Stratford)
- Cpl. H. Holmes, Royal Welsh Fusiliers (Birmingham)
- Gnr. J. T. Holmes, Royal Field Arty. (Canning Town, London)
- Pte. G. Holt, Nottinghamshire and Derbyshire Reg. (Derby)
- L. Cpl. B. Holt, Royal Warwickshire Reg. (Henley-in-Arden)
- Cpl. H. Homer, Machine Gun Corps (E. Manchester)
- Pte. H. Homewood, Royal West Surrey Reg. (Hailing, Kent)
- Dvr. E. Hook, Army Service Corps (Woodhouse)
- Pte. G. Hook, West Riding Reg. (Bingley)
- M. S. Hookway, Royal Flying Corps (Bideford)
- Pte. H. C. M. Hooper, RAMC (Darlington)
- Pte. J. Hooson, Lancashire Fusiliers (Pendleton)
- Cpl. J. Hope, Royal Field Arty. (Durham)
- Sgt. B. N. Hope, Durham Light Inf. (Fencehouses)
- Cpl. S. Hope, Machine Gun Corps (Heaton)
- L. Sgt. J. B. Hopkins, Devonshire Reg. (Rhondda)
- Pte. J. Horan, Irish Guards (Enfield, County Meath)
- Cpl. J. Home, Royal Field Arty. (Solehull)
- Pte. A. Homer, West Yorkshire Reg. (Ripon)
- Gnr. G. Hornibrook, Royal Field Arty. (S. Kensington, London)
- Pte. J. Horridge, Lancashire Fusiliers (Lower Broughton)
- Gnr. S. Horton, Royal Field Arty. (Wolverhampton)
- Pte. C. H. Hoskins, Gloucestershire Reg. (Boscombe)
- Spr. B. Houghton, Royal Engineers (Manchester)
- Dvr. R. Howard, Royal Field Arty. (Southend)
- Dvr. S. Howard, Royal Field Arty. (Ashton-upon-Lyne)
- Pte. F. Howarth, West Riding Reg. (Halifax)
- Sgt. G. A. Howarth, Royal Field Arty. (Radcliffe)
- Pte. L. P. D. Howarth, Coldstream Guards (Leicester)
- Sgt. F. J. Howe, Border Reg. (Baldock)
- Sgt. J. Howe, Royal Warwickshire Reg. (Coventry)
- Pte. J. E. Howe, West Yorkshire Reg. (Bradford)
- Pte. W. Howker, West Riding Reg. (Keigh
- Pte. C. Howlett, Royal West Surrey Reg. (Islington, London)
- Cpl. R. C. Howley, Royal Field Arty. (Leytonstone, London)
- Able Seaman J. T. Hoyle, Royal Naval Volunteer Reserve (Beamish)
- Bombr. S. J. Huett, Royal Field Arty. (Stratford, London)
- Pte. C. A. Hughes, Shropshire Light Inf. (Hereford)
- Cpl. E. Hughes, Royal Fusiliers (W. Baling)
- L. Cpl. F. Hughes, Royal Engineers (Horsham)
- Dvr. F. Hughes, Royal Field Arty. (Mexico)
- Sgt. H. W. Hughes, Border Reg. (Eltham)
- Cpl. T. Hull, Northumberland Fusiliers (Leyton)
- Sgt. G. Hulse, Royal Engineers (Hulme)
- L. Cpl. L. Hunneybell, Hampshire Reg. (Aldershot)
- Pte. A. E. W. Hunt, Essex Reg. (Shoeburyness)
- Cpl. A. S. Hunt, Nottinghamshire and Derbyshire Reg. (Nottingham)
- Cpl. F. Hunt, Cheshire Reg. (Northwich)
- Pte. J. J. Hunt, Irish Guards (Milford Haven)
- Pnr. S. A. Hunt, Royal Engineers (Old Kent Rd., London)
- Sgt. W. Hunt, Nottinghamshire and Derbyshire Reg. (Nottingham)
- Spr. J. Hunter, Royal Engineers (Jarrow)
- Sgt. J. W. Hunter, Northumberland Fusiliers (Gateshead)
- Sgt. J. Hurley, Royal Field Arty. (Westcliff-on-Sea)
- Pte. H. Hurworth, Durham Light Inf. (Saltburn-by-Sea)
- Cpl. H. J. Hutchings, London Reg. (Leytonstone)
- Pte. J. Hutchings, Royal Sussex Reg. (Midhurst)
- Pnr. J. Hutchinson, Royal Engineers (Butterknowle)
- Pte. J. Hutchison, Royal Highlanders (Edinburgh)
- L. Cpl. P. R. Hutchings, Gordon Highlanders (Dorset)
- Pte. G. A. Hynard, Bedfordshire Reg. (Hadleigh)
- Pte. H. Hynes, West Riding Reg. (Marsden)
- Gnr. R. Ibbotson, Royal Garrison Arty. (Finsbury Park, London)
- Pte. W. Illingworth, Lancashire Fusiliers (Staleybridge)
- Sgt. T. W. Ingham, Grenadier Guards (Northampton)
- Pte. J. H. Ingleby, Yorkshire Reg. (Wheatley Hill)
- Pte. A. E. Ingles, Royal West Kent Reg. (Oulton Broad)
- Sgt. A. Inglis, West Yorkshire Reg. (Gateshead-on-Tyne)
- Bombr. J. Inman, Royal Field Arty. (Grassington)
- Act. Cpl. W. Irving, Royal Engineers (Seaham Colliery)
- Pte. A. Jackson, Rifle Brigade (Bow E.)
- Pte. J. Jackson, Coldstream Guards (Hartlepool)
- Cpl. J. Jackson, Lincolnshire Reg. (Spalding)
- Dvr. J. H. Jackson, Royal Field Arty. (Edmonton, London)
- Pte. J. W. Jackson, Royal West Surrey Reg. (Bramley)
- Pte. J. W. Jackson, Yorkshire Reg. (Middlesbrough)
- Sgt. S. Jackson, Leicestershire Reg. (Leeds)
- Pte. T. Jackson, Northumberland Fusiliers (Woolton)
- Pte. W. Jackson, London Reg. (Hampstead Road, London)
- Pte. W. Jackson, Manchester Reg. (Manchester)
- Sgt. P. C. Jacob, Rifle Brigade (Notting Hill)
- Spr. S. T. Jacobs, Royal Engineers (King's Lynn)
- Pte. E. Jacques, Nottinghamshire and Derbyshire Reg. (Chesterfield)
- Pte. J. Jakins, Leicestershire Reg. (Chesterfield)
- Sgt. H. James, Machine Gun Corps (Southend-on-Sea)
- Gnr. D. W. Jardine, Royal Field Arty. (South Shields)
- Pte. T. F. Jarrett, Royal West Kent Reg. (Tonbridge)
- Pte. G. Jarvis, RAMC (Worcester)
- L. Cpl. W. E. Jarvis, Royal Warwickshire Reg. (Kidderminster)
- Sgt. W. J. Jauncey, Royal Garrison Arty. (Birmingham)
- Sgt. A. Jeacock, Royal Warwickshire Reg. (Coventry)
- Pte. G. Jefferson, Gordon Highlanders (Burton-on-Trent)
- Pte. A. J. Jeffries, Suffolk Reg. (Sudbury)
- Pte. J. Jeffries, Northumberland Fusiliers (Horden)
- L. Sgt. G. Jeffs, Lancashire Fusiliers (Parkgate)
- Sgt. F. Jenkins, Shropshire Light Inf. (Smetbwick)
- Pte. W. S. Jenkins, RAMC (Brixton)
- Pte. P. Jenkinson, York & Lancaster Reg. (Sheffield)
- Cpl. G. Jenner, Royal West Kent Reg. (Tunbridge-Wells)
- L. Cpl. B. Jennings, West Riding Reg. (Wolfverhampton)
- Sgt. P. C. Jennings, Royal Field Arty. (East Dulwich, London)
- Pte. A. B. Johnson, Norfolk Reg. (Harleston)
- Sgt. C. Johnson, Lancashire Fusiliers (Birmingham)
- Spr. F. Johnson, Royal Engineers (Hammersmith)
- Pte. H. Johnson, East Surrey Reg. (Walton-on-Thames)
- Pte. T. Johnson, Machine Gun Corps (Bolton)
- Pte. W. F. Johnson, West Yorkshire Reg. (Monk Fryston)
- Cpl. H. Johnston, Bedfordshire Reg. (Epsom)
- L. Cpl. R. Johnston, Manchester Reg. (Liverpool)
- Dvr. W. Johnston, Royal Field Arty. (Brechin)
- Pte. D. M. Johnstons, Argyll and Sutherland Highlanders (Haugh-of-Urr)
- Pte. G. D. Johnstone, Yorkshire Light Inf. (Newcastle)
- Pte. H. Johnstone, late Royal Scots (Monkton)
- Sgt. J. Johnstone, Gordon Highlanders (Maghoa)
- Gnr. A. Jones, Royal Garrison Arty. (Malvern)
- Dvr. B. Jones, Royal Field Arty. (Glyncarriog)
- Sgt. B. Jones, South Staffordshire Reg. (Sedgeley)
- Pnr. C. E. Jones, Royal Engineers (Madley)
- Pte. D. Jones, Lancashire Fusiliers (Abergele)
- Bombr. D. O. Jones, Royal Field Arty. (Clapham, London)
- Pte. F. R. Jones, Worcestershire Reg. (Dudley)
- Cpl. O. Jones, Royal Welsh Fusiliers (Pwllheli)
- Pte. R. Jones, Norfolk Reg. (Bethnal Green)
- Spr. R. Jones, Royal Engineers (Church Stretton)
- L. Cpl. R. Jones, Royal Welsh Fusiliers (Llanrwst)
- Pte. R. Jones, Leicestershire Reg. (Sutton-in-Ashfield)
- Dvr. S. Jones, Royal Field Arty. (Bilston)
- Cpl. T. Jones, Royal Engineers (Charlbury)
- Pte. W. Jones, South Staffordshire Reg. (Brierley Hill)
- Boinbr. W. Jones, Royal Field Arty. (Wolverhampton)
- Spr. W. J. Jones, Royal Engineers (Rhynmey)
- Pte. W. J. Jones, Honourable Arty. Company (Treffgarne)
- Spr. A. H. Jordan, Royal Engineers (Plymouth)
- Act. Bombr. C. Jordan, Royal Garrison Arty. (Sutton)
- L. Cpl. J. T. Jordan, Rifle Brigade (East Ham)
- L. Cpl. G. Joule, Cheshire Reg. (Stalybridge)
- Pte. C. Joyce, Machine Gun Guards (Bolton)
- L. Cpl. E. Joynes, West Riding Reg. (Sheffield)
- Act. Cpl. G. A. Joynes, Labour Corps (Barwick-in-Elmet)
- Dvr. J. E. Just, Royal Field Arty. (Shap)
- L. Cpl. H. Kane, West Riding Reg. (Lochore)
- Pte. H. Kane, Irish Guards (Ashford, County Wicklow)
- Pte. H. A. V. Kattau, London Reg. (Stockwell)
- Sgt. H. Kay, Manchester Reg. (Manchester)
- Pte. P. Keane, Royal Scots Fusiliers (Bonnybridge)
- L. Sgt. P. Kearney, Irish Guards (Belfast)
- Pte. C. Keeling, South Staffordshire Reg. (Deepfields)
- Dvr. D. Keenan, Royal Field Arty. (Valleyfield, Fife)
- Pte. T. Keenan, Seaforth Highlanders (Lochee)
- Gnr. M. Keighley, Royal Field Arty. (Bolton)
- Pte. V. Keily, RAMC (Stradbally)
- Pnr. T. Kelly, Royal Engineers (E. Manchester)
- Spr. G. Kelly, Royal Engineers (Newcastle upon Tyne)
- Pte. J. Kelsall, Royal Lancaster Reg. (Manchester)
- Cpl. T. P. Kenny, Irish Guards (Dublin)
- Bombr. H. G. Kent, Royal Field Arty. (Hove)
- Pnr. K. A. O. Kenward, Royal Engineers (Heathfield)
- Sgt. A. Kenyon, West Riding Reg. (Huddersfield)
- Cpl. W. F. Kermode, Coldstream Guards (Peel)
- Act. Bombr. J. W. Kershaw, Royal Field Arty. (Oldham)
- Gnr. W.J. Kerton, Royal Garrison Arty. (Shepton Mallet)
- Cpl. J. W. Key, Royal Sussex Reg. (Long Eaton)
- Pte. A. B. Kibble, Middlesex Reg. (New Cross)
- L. Cpl. E. Kidger, Nottinghamshire and Derbyshire Reg. (Leicester)
- Pte. A. Kilkenny, Irish Guards (Derryclagh)
- Pte. A. King, Bedfordshire Reg. (Bedford)
- Pte. E. S. G. King, Royal West Kent Reg. (S. Norwood)
- L. Cpl. E. T. King, Cambridgeshire Reg. (Cambridge)
- Spr. J. King, Royal Engineers (West Hartlepool)
- Sgt. J. King, Border Reg. (Kendal)
- Spr. F. Kirby, Royal Engineers (Chesterfield)
- Pte. C. Kirk, Lancashire Fusiliers (Staines)
- Pte. W. Kirkham, Shropshire Light Inf. (Whitchurch, Salop)
- Sgt. J. Kite, Royal Field Arty. (Curbridge)
- Pte. W. Kitely, Bedfordshire Reg. (Arlesey)
- Pte. W. Knight, South Staffordshire Reg. (Codicote, Welwyn)
- Pte. A. Knowles, Nottinghamshire and Derbyshire Reg. (Tibshelf)
- Pte. F. H. C. Kunz, Suffolk Reg. (Forest Gate)
- Cpl. E. A. Kynaston, Shropshire Light Inf. (Ellesmere)
- Pte. J. Lacey, Leicestershire Reg. (Leicester)
- Cpl. W. Laidlaw, King's Own Scottish Borderers (Hawick)
- Pte. G. Laing, Labour Corps (Aberdeen)
- L. Cpl. J. W. Lake, Lincolnshire Reg. (Grimsby)
- Sgt. W. Lake, Oxfordshire & Buckinghamshire Light Inf. (Woodford-Halse)
- Pte. J. Lakin, South Staffordshire Reg. (Atherstone)
- Cpl. E. Lamb, Northumberland Fusiliers (Hordon Colliery)
- Gnr. H. Lamble, Royal Field Arty. (Kingsbridge)
- Cpl. T. Lancashire, Lancashire Fusiliers (Oldham)
- Sgt. S. Langley, Royal Field Arty. (East Greenwich)
- Sgt. F. E. Langrish, London Reg. (East Ham)
- Cpl. H. F. Lansley, London Reg. (Tottenham)
- Pte. W. Latham, Manchester Reg. (St. Helens)
- L. Cpl. H. W. Lattimore, Machine Gun Corps (Hull)
- Pte. J. Lavelle, Irish Guards (Inneskea, Belmullet)
- Pte. M. Lavery, Royal Scots Fusiliers (Glasgow)
- L. Sgt. J. Law, Coldstream Guards (Smethwick, Staffs.)
- Cpl. G. B. A. Lawes, Lancashire Fusiliers (Dartmouth)
- Cpl. F. E. Lawrence, Royal West Kent Reg. (Shoreham-by-Sea)
- Dvr. J. Lawrence, Royal Field Arty. (llyhope)
- Cpl. E. H. Laws, Yorkshire Reg. (Ryhope)
- Sgt. C. Lawson, Nottinghamshire and Derbyshire Reg. (Coventry)
- Pte. F. Laycock, West Riding Reg. (Brighouse)
- Pte. A. E. Lea, Royal Warwickshire Reg. (Birmingham)
- Gnr. F. Lea, Royal Field Arty. (Wednesbury)
- Pte. J. Leach, Gordon Highlanders (Chorley, Lancaster)
- Pte. H. V. Lee, Norfolk Reg. (Birmingham)
- Pte. E. Leech, Grenadier Guards (Pulford)
- Pte. E. Leech, Lancashire Fusiliers (Alderley Edge)
- Act. Sgt. W. Leggatt, Gordon Highlanders (Paisley)
- Sgt. J. A. Leggett, Norfolk Reg. (Norwich)
- Pte. W. C. Leggott, Welsh Reg. (Cambridge)
- Cpl. H. Leitch, Royal Field Arty. (Dunoon)
- 2nd Cpl. A. Leith, Royal Engineers (Limerick)
- Pte. A. V. Lemon, Royal West Surrey Reg. (Weymouth)
- Cpl. A. Leonard, Royal Field Arty. (Mildenhall)
- L. Cpl. D. Leonard, Yorkshire Reg. (Bishop Auckland)
- Sgt. J. Leonard, Lancashire Fusiliers (Billinge)
- L. Cpl. M. Leonard, Northumberland Fusiliers (Burnhope)
- Pte. E. C. Leslie, Border Reg. (Battersea)
- Pte. S. Levi, Machine Gun Corps (E. Whitehall)
- Dvr. D. W. Lewis, Royal Field Arty. (Llandebie)
- Sgt. E. E. Lewis, Royal Field Arty. (Pembroke)
- Pte. H. Lewis, Worcestershire Reg. (Bromsgrove)
- Cpl. J. W. Lewis, Lancashire Fusiliers (Swiriton)
- L. Cpl. A. S. Leybourne, Military Foot Police (Chesterton)
- Pte. F. Liddiard, Lancashire Fusiliers (Birchvale)
- Pte. A. K. Lidgett, Army Service Corps (St. John's Wood)
- Sgt. D. Light, Royal Field Arty. (Boston, Lincolnshire)
- Sgt. R. Lightfoot, Gloucestershire Reg. (Sharpness)
- Pte. J. Liles, Lancashire Fusiliers (Bolton)
- Pte. T. Lillie, Northumberland Fusiliers (Blyth)
- Pte. F. G. Linder, Suffolk Reg. (Lowestoft)
- Pte. H. Lincoln, West Yorkshire Reg. (Hull)
- Pte. W. Lines, Northumberland Fusiliers (Walsall)
- Cpl. F. J. Linsey, Royal West Surrey Reg. (S. Crpydon)
- Cpl. C. W. Linton, Royal Field Arty. (Drury Lane, London)
- Pte. H. Lisle, West Riding Reg. (Ashington)
- Pte. H. Lister, West Riding Reg. (Woodhouse-Mill)
- Pte. T. H. Lister, Manchester Reg. (Rotherham)
- L. Cpl. R. G. Liston, Royal Scots (Dornoch)
- Pfe H. J. Little, Royal West Surrey Reg. (Walthaanstow)
- Bte. T. Little, Royal West Kent Reg. (Writtle)
- Cpl. J. Littler, North Staffordshire Reg. (Longton)
- Pte. H. Llewellyn, Gloucestershire Reg. (Bristol)
- Spr. E. F. Loades, Royal Engineers (Bury St. Edmunds)
- Pte. F. Lockwood, York & Lancaster Reg. (Wakefield)
- Cpl. F. G. Lodge, RAMC (Bristol)
- Dvr. J. Loftus, Royal Field Arty. (Bolton, Lancaster)
- Gnr. J. W. Long, Royal Garrison Arty. (Yeadon)
- Cpl. B. Lord, York & Lancaster Reg. (Wathon, Dearrie)
- Pte. A. Loveland, Royal West Surrey Reg. (Camberley)
- Pte. J. Low, Gordon Highlanders (Glasgow)
- Bombr. T. Lowther, Royal Field Arty. (Halton)
- Pte. E. H. Luff, Royal West Kent Reg. (Battersea Park)
- Pte. A. Luke, Devonshire Reg. (Penzance)
- L. Cpl. T. Luke, Northumberland Fusiliers (Birtley, County Durham)
- Pte. W. Lunn, Royal Warwickshire Reg. (Birmingham)
- Pte. G. Lymer, Coldstream Guards (Kilsby)
- Pte. S. Lynn, East Surrey Reg. (E. Dulwich)
- Pte. M. Lyons, Lancashire Fusiliers (Southport)
- Act. Cpl. F. S. Mabbs, Norfolk Reg. (East Twickenham)
- Pte. W. MacAllister, Machine Gun Corps (Ballymena)
- L. Cpl. J. Macaulay, Seaforth Highlanders (Kilmarnock)
- Pte. C. Macdonald, Seaforth Highlanders (Stornoway)
- L. Sgt. A. Mackenzie, Cameron Highlanders (Skye)
- Pte. R. Mackie, York & Lancaster Reg. (South Shields)
- Pte. A. Mackintosh, London Reg. (Hoxton)
- Pte. H. G. Macklen, Lancashire Fusiliers (Staines)
- Gnr. P. A. Macnamara, Royal Field Arty. (Dundee)
- Pte. H. MacTaggart, Argyll and Sutherland Highlanders (Dailly)
- Sgt. T. Magee, Lancashire Fusiliers (Eccles)
- Pte. E. Maguire, King's Own Scottish Borderers (Glasgow)
- Dvr. F. Maguire, Royal Field Arty. (Hamilton)
- Pte. B. Maiden, Machine Gun Corps (Wollaston)
- L. Cpl. J. A. Main, Seaforth Highlanders (Findhorn)
- L. Cpl. D. Mair, Gam. Higihrs. (Nairn)
- L. Cpl. N. F. Maker, Devonshire Reg. (Bere
- Pte. P. Malkin, Leicestershire Reg. (Burbage)
- Cpl. J. Maloney, Machine Gun Corps (Galway)
- Bombr. T. D. Malsbury, Royal Field Arty. (Moxley)
- Spr. C. F. Malyon, Royal Engineers, formerly, RAMC (Thorney)
- Bombr. J. M. Mann, Royal Field Arty. (Carlisle)
- Dvr. W. R. Mann, Army Service Corps (Bayswater)
- Pte. E. Manning, Suffolk Reg. (North Stow)
- Pte. E. Manning, Royal West Kent Reg. (Orpington)
- Sgt. C. Mannion, Machine Gun Corps (Collyhurst)
- Spr. A. H. March, Royal Engineers (Bath)
- Pte. W. H. March, Nottinghamshire and Derbyshire Reg. (Kimberley)
- Pte. F. Marchant, Devonshire Reg. (Ottery St. Mary)
- Pte. E. J. Marchant, Worcestershire Reg. (Salisbury)
- L. Cpl. R. Markham, West Yorkshire Reg. (Sheffield)
- Pte. T. Markham, Lincolnshire Reg. (Grimsby)
- Bombr. J. Marlow, Royal Field Arty. (Merton Abbey, London)
- Pte. J. Marner, RAMC (Dunadry)
- Spr. W. Marriott, Royal Engineers (Wellingborough)
- Sgt.F. Marsh, Gloucestershire Reg. (Bristol)
- Pte. V. J. Marsh, Rifle Brigade (Fulham)
- Spr. W. Marsh, Royal Engineers (Manchester)
- Pte. E. Marshall, Rifle Brigade (Elland)
- Pte. W. F. Marshall, RAMC (Bradford)
- Cpl. (, Sergeant) T. Marston, Leicestershire Reg. (Loughborough)
- Pte. A. W. Martin, RAMC (Bosham)
- Pte. C. A. Martin, RAMC (Derby)
- Pte. D. Martin, Machine Gun Corps (Kingston)
- Dvr. G. Martin, Royal Field Arty. (Burgess Hill)
- Pte. J. Martin, Labour Corps (Newcistle-on-Tyne)
- Sgt. J. W. Martin, Army Service Corps (Manor Park)
- Cpl. N. Marian, Royal Engineers (Jarrow)
- Cpl. R. S. W. Martin, Lincolnshire Reg. (Chaudlersford)
- 2nd Cpl. S. G. Martin, Royal Engineers (Balham, London)
- Pte. C. Mason, Royal Sussex Reg. (Clare, Suffolk)
- Sgt. E. Mason, Royal Warwickshire Reg. (Birmingham)
- Pte. F. Mason, Machine Gun Corps (Whixley)
- Pte. G. Mason, West Riding Reg. (Caton)
- Sgt. J. H. Mason, Royal Engineers (Sheffield)
- Sgt. A. Masson, Royal Field Arty. (E. Elgin)
- Sgt. F. Masters, Royal Sussex Reg. (Battle)
- Pte. H. V. Matlock, Leicestershire Reg. (Shepshed)
- Sgt. J. Mafetey, Royal Field Arty. (Winkfield)
- Cpl. of H. E. C. Matthews, Household Battalion (Leicester)
- Drummer H. Matthews, Middlesex Reg. (Lower Clapton, London)
- Pte. S. Matthews, West Riding Reg. (Howarth)
- Cpl. T. H. Matthtews, RAMC (Exeter)
- Fitter Staff Sergeant B. J. Mate, Royal Field Arty. (Nottingham)
- Sgt. H. J. Maule, Machine Gun Corps (Tiddington)
- Act. Cpl. T. A. Maw, Royal Lancaster Reg. (Gainsborough)
- Cpl. E. Mawbey, Grenadier Guards (Willesden, London)
- Pte. V. May, Royal West Kent Reg. (Waterford)
- Cpl. R. H. Mayson, Royal Field Arty. (Keswick)
- Sgt. H. G. McCabe, Coldstream Guards (Smethwick)
- Cpl. R. McConnell, Irish Guards (Larne)
- Cpl. A. McDonald, Norfolk Reg. (Poplar, London)
- Pte. H. McDonald, RAMC (Glasgow)
- Able Seaman J. McDonald, Royal Naval Volunteer Reserve (Aberdeen)
- Cpl. H. A. McDonnell, Leicestershire Reg. (Loughborough)
- Pte. W. McFadyen, Royal Highlanders (Methil)
- Pte. A. McGhee, Labour Corps (Glasgow)
- L. Cpl. J. McGoldrick, York & Lancaster Reg. (St. Ninians)
- Pte. J. McGregor, Gordon Highlanders (Glasgow)
- Dvr. F. McGuire, Royal Field Arty. (West Hartlepool)
- Pte. F. McHugh, Machine Gun Guards (Drumkeirn)
- Sgt. D. McIntyre, Argyll and Sutherland Highlanders (Kerrera)
- Sgt. D. McIver, Seaforth Highlanders (Inverness)
- Pte. J. McKay, Seaforth Highlanders (Forres)
- Pte. R. McKellan, Army Service Corps (Alberta, Can.)
- Pte. R. McKenzie, Seaforth Highlanders (Dumfries)
- Cpl. J. McLaren, Royal Highlanders (Fernigair)
- Pte. M. McLean, Gordon Highlanders (Dundonnell by Garve)
- Pte. R. McLean, RAMC (Lochgelly)
- L. Cpl. R. McLellan, Seaforth Highlanders (Kirkcudbright)
- Pte. J. McLeod, Gordon Highlanders (Glasgow)
- Cpl. J. McMahon, Royal Sussex Reg. (Coventry)
- Pte. M. McMahon, Nottinghamshire and Derbyshire Reg. (Chesterfield)
- L. Cpl. T. McMahon, Royal Highlanders (Boness)
- Pte. J. McManus, Northumberland Fusiliers (East Cramlington)
- Pte. T. H. McMinemy, West Riding Reg. (Caledon)
- L. Cpl. A. M. McNeill, Nottinghamshire and Derbyshire Reg. (Lochgilphead)
- Sgt. A. McNulty, Gordon Highlanders (Hamilton)
- Pte. P. McNulty, Irish Guards (Ballyjamesduff)
- Sgt. J. McQuade, Labour Corps (Glasgow)
- Pte. D. McQuarrie, Argyll and Sutherland Highlanders (Greenock)
- Pte. W. McQueen, RAMC (Edinburgh)
- L. Cpl. A. McWilliams, Argyll and Sutherland Highlanders (Glasgow)
- Sgt. G. Meadows, West Yorkshire Reg. (Byker, Newcastle upon Tyne)
- Sgt. J. R. Mean, Machine Gun Corps (Seaham Harbour)
- Sgt. P. Mearns, Gordon Highlanders (Aboyne)
- Gnr. A. J. Mears, Royal Garrison Arty. (Hoxton)
- Sgt. J. Mears, Royal Field Arty. (Haggerston)
- Cpl. P. Meechan, Royal Field Arty. (Edinburgh)
- Pte. A. Meen, Royal West Kent Reg. (Northfleet)
- SjB. W. Meer, Royal Field Arty. (Ilkeston)
- Pte. T. Meeres, Northumberland Fusiliers (Hoxton)
- Pte. L. Meggit, York & Lancaster Reg. (Kilnhurst)
- Pte. G. Melcalfe, West Riding Reg. (Bradford)
- Pnr. W. Mellars, Royal Engineers (Rotherham)
- Dvr. J. B. Melling, Royal Field Arty. (Preston)
- Pte. A. H. Mendes, Rifle Brigade (Trinidad)
- Gnr. N. A. Menzies, Royal Field Arty. (Leith)
- Cpl. H. S. Merriman, West Riding Reg. (Battyeford)
- Gnr. N. B. Merritt, Royal Field Arty. (Leeds)
- Sgt. H. Metcalfe, Machine Gun Corps (York)
- Pte. J. Metcalfe, West Riding Reg. (Keigh
- L. Cpl. G. L. Mettam, Nottinghamshire and Derbyshire Reg. (Stapleford)
- Pte. W. J. Middleditch, Grenadier Guards (Maldon, Essex)
- Pte. A. R. Middleton, Machine Gun Corps (Aston)
- Spr. D. J. Middleton, Royal Engineers (Deptford, London)
- L. Cpl. W. Middleton, West Yorkshire Reg. (Leeds)
- Pte. J. P. Miles, Royal West Kent Reg. (Penge)
- Pte. G. Miller, Machine Gun Corps (Whitehaven)
- Gnr. R. H. Miller, Royal Garrison Arty. (Sale, Cheshire)
- Pte. W. G. Millington, RAMC (Shrewsbury)
- Gnr. J. Millmore, Royal Field Arty. (Tantobie)
- Cpl. G. D. Mills, Royal Engineers (Norwich)
- Pte. J. Mills, Yorkshire Reg. (Sunderland)
- Pte. J. A. Mills, Machine Gun Corps (Huddersfield)
- L. Cpl. R. Mills, Oxfordshire & Buckinghamshire Light Inf. (Yardley)
- Pte. W. Mills, Yorkshire Light Inf. (Sheffield)
- Pte. H. Millson, West Yorkshire Reg. (Leeds)
- Pte. W. Millward, Worcestershire Reg. (Bewdley)
- Pte. A. Milne, Royal Scots (Edinburgh)
- Pte. J. Milne, Manchester Reg., attd. Royal Engineers (Rochdale)
- Pte. C. Mitchell, Army Service Corps (Sowerby Bridge)
- Gnr. C. Mitchell, Royal Garrison Arty. (E. Arbroath)
- Spr. C. W. Mitchell, Royal Engineers (Sandbach)
- Sgt. C. W. Mitchell, Royal Marine Field Arty. (Doncaster)
- Pte. J. Mitchell, Gordon Highlanders (Greenock)
- Pte. P. Mitchell, Gordon Highlanders (Hill of Beath, Fife)
- L. Cpl. R. Mole, Northumberland Fusiliers (Cullercoats)
- Sgt. B. Monaghan, Royal Field Arty. (Leeds)
- L. Cpl. D. Monk, Cameron Highlanders (Benbecula)
- Pte. E. Monkhouse, Yorkshire Reg. (Notting Hill)
- Spr. R. B. Moody, Royal Engineers (Bishop Auckland)
- Sgt. A. J. Moore, Royal Garrison Arty. (Sandgate)
- Pte. T. Moore, South Staffordshire Reg. (Pelsall)
- Cpl. W. Moralee, Northumberland Fusiliers (Byker)
- Pte. J. Moreland, Gordon Highlanders (Edinburgh)
- Gnr. G. J. E. Morgan, Royal Field Arty. (Roseville, Coseley)
- Pte. J. H. Morgan, Northumberland Fusiliers (North Shields)
- Pte. T. Morgan, Lancashire Fusiliers (Warrington)
- Pte. A. Moring, Royal West Kent Reg. (Clapton)
- Cpl. F. L. Morley, Royal Fusiliers (Sudbury)
- Gnr. R. W. Morley, Royal Field Arty. (Lower Tooting)
- Sgt. T. Morley, Nottinghamshire and Derbyshire Reg. (Derby)
- Pte. J. G. Morrice, Gordon Highlanders (Tarland)
- Able Seaman A. R. Morris, Royal Naval Volunteer Reserve (Laugharne)
- Sgt. B. Morris, Royal Field Arty. (Swansea)
- Pte. D. Morris, Northumberland Fusiliers (Dunston-on-Tyne)
- Dvr. G. Morris, Royal Field Arty. (Edmonton)
- B.Q.M. Sgt. W. Morris, Royal Field Arty. (Tinbury Wells)
- L. Cpl. W. Morris, Royal Lancaster Reg. (Hyde)
- L. Cpl. W. G. Morris, Seaforth Highlanders (London)
- Pte. W. J. P. Morris, Honourable Arty. Company (Welshpool)
- Pte. G. D. Morrison, RAMC (Aberdeen)
- L. Cpl. P. Morrison, Royal Highlanders (Bankfoot)
- Pte. A. Moss, East Surrey Reg. (Southfields)
- Cpl. J. Mould, Northumberland Fusiliers (South Shields)
- Spr. C. E. Mounsley, Royal Engineers (Darlington)
- Pte. A. Mountfprd, RAMC (Bashford)
- Pte. E. Moxon, Yorkshire Light Inf. (Pontefract)
- Pte. J. Moyes, Royal Highlanders (Duufermline)
- Dvr. A. Muir, Royal Field Arty. (Edinburgh)
- Pte. C. Mumford, Hampshire Reg. (Ware Park)
- Pte. I. Murphy, Royal Scots (Glasgow)
- L. Cpl. F. S. Murray, Middlesex Reg. (Walthamstow)
- Dvr. G. A. Murray, Royal Field Arty. (Chesterle-Street)
- Bombr. J. G. Murray, Royal Field Arty. (Newcastle upon Tyne)
- Pte. K. Murray, Seaforth Highlanders (Alness)
- Bombr. F. Musgrove, Royal Field Arty. (Leeds)
- Pte. W. Musgrove, West Yorkshire Reg. (Leeds)
- Pte. S. Musselbrook, Nottinghamshire and Derbyshire Reg. (Dulwich)
- Dvr. E. Naven, Royal Field Arty. (Birmingham)
- Pte. E. Naylor, York & Lancaster Reg. (Sheffield)
- Pte. J. H. Naylor, West Riding Reg. (Halifax)
- Gnr. A. Neaversonr Royal Garrison Arty. (Burton-on-Trent)
- Pte. J. Nelson, Royal Highlanders (Edinburgh)
- Pte. J. W. Nelson, West Riding Reg. (Barnsley)
- Pte. H. Nevard, Essex Reg. (Colchester)
- Pte. J. Newall, Royal Lancaster Reg. (Manchester)
- C.Q.M.S. W. C. Newberry, Devonshire Reg. (Exeter)
- L. Cpl. F. Newcombe, Dorsetshire Reg. (Hatherleigh)
- Sgt. C. Newland, RAMC (Wrexham)
- L. Cpl. A. Newlands, Manchester Reg. (Horwich)
- Sgt. A. H. Newman, Royal Field Arty. (E. Gloucester)
- Pte. H. Newman, Grenadier Guards (Kingsdown)
- Pte. S. Newman, Royal Sussex Reg. (Wimbledon)
- L. Cpl. A. H. Newson, Yorkshire Reg. (Norwich)
- Cpl. T. P. Newton, Royal Field Arty. (Guiseley)
- Pte. H. Nice, Norfolk Reg. (Fring)
- Pte. J. Nicholas, Royal Lancaster Reg. (Claytonle-Moors)
- Pte. P. A. Nicholl, Royal Sussex Reg. (Brighton)
- L. Cpl. G. H. Nicholls, Royal Warwickshire Reg. (Wednesbury)
- Pte. E. O. Nicholson, West Yorkshire Reg. (Leeds)
- Cpl. F. Nicholson, Lancashire Fusiliers (West Baling)
- Pte. R. D. Nicolson, Cameron Highlanders (Skye)
- Sgt. W. H. Nightingale, Royal Marine Field Arty. (Hornsey)
- Gnr. V. Nikitenko, Royal Garrison Arty. (E. Newton Grange)
- Gnr. H. Nimmo, Royal Field Arty. (Glasgow)
- Cpl. A. Nixon, East Lancashire Reg. (Burnley)
- Sgt. A. Noble, Royal Lancaster Reg. (Kettering)
- Pte. R. Noble, Royal Scots Fusiliers (Paisley)
- Pte. E. W. Norman, Royal Warwickshire Reg. (Birmingham)
- Spr. W. B. Norman, Royal Engineers (Jarrow)
- Pte. G. Norris, Machine Gun Corps (Southampton)
- Act. Cpl. H. G. A. Norris, Essex Reg. (Manor Park)
- Pte. C. North, Royal West Surrey Reg. (Dockingfield)
- L. Sgt. S. C. Nother, King's Royal Rifle Corps (Winchester)
- Pte. A. Norton, Coldstream Guards, attd. Machine Gun Guards (Fotherby)
- Cpl. R. D. Norwood, Norfolk Reg. (Stonebridge Park, London)
- Act. Bombr. A. D. Oakley, Royal Field Arty. (Forest Gate)
- Gnr. W. E. Oakley, Royal Field Arty. (York)
- Bombr. C. O'Brien, Royal Field Arty. (Tunstall)
- Cpl. W. Odd, Royal Engineers (Mereworth)
- Pte. G. O'Donoghue, Machine Gun Guards (Slane)
- L. Sgt. C. G. O'Kelly, York & Lancaster Reg. (Halifax)
- Spr. W. Older, Royal Engineers (Hastings)
- Pte. W. A. Oldfield, Gloucestershire Reg. (Walthamstow)
- Sgt. J. Oliver, Machine Gun Corps (Bridgworth)
- Pte. J. E. Oliver, East Yorkshire Reg. (Tinsley)
- Pte. M. O'Neill, Grenadier Guards (Bantry)
- Sgt. W. O'Neill, Manchester Reg. (Manchester)
- Sgt. D. H. Ormerod, Royal Lancaster Reg. (E. Manchester)
- Spr. A. Orwin, Royal Engineers (Sheffield)
- Sgt. J. G. Osborne, Worcestershire Reg. (Birmingham)
- Gnr. J. W. Osborne, Royal Field Arty. (Elland)
- Act. Bombr. S. Osborne, Royal Garrison Arty. (Great Clacton)
- Pte. P. D. Ottley, Army Service Corps (Willesden, London)
- Pte. T. H. E. Ovenden, Suffolk Reg. (Plumstead, London)
- Dvr. A. W. Owen, Royal Field Arty. (Bermondsey)
- Air Mechanic, 1st Class S. Owefl, Royal Flying Corps (Armedale)
- Cpl. W. Owen, Royal Warwickshire Reg. (Learnington)
- Pte. B. Owens, Machine Gun Corps (North Carolina, U.S.A.)
- Cpl. E. Oxby, Lincolnshire Reg. (Retford)
- Gnr. (Driver) J. Oxby, Royal Garrison Arty. (Lazills)
- Cpl. F. Page, Royal Field Arty. (Manchester)
- Pte. J. Page, Suffolk Reg. (West Wickham)
- Cpl. W. B. Page, Suffolk Reg. (Ipswich)
- Gnr. C. H. Pain, Royal Field Arty. (Walworth)
- Dvr. W. Pain, Royal Field Arty. (Staines)
- Sgt. F. Palmer, Royal Field Arty. (Dorking)
- Pte. O. Palmer, Leicestershire Reg. (Leicester)
- Pte. J. G. Pardington, Machine Gun Corps (E. Stroud)
- Act. Bombr. H. Parfitt, Royal Field Arty. (Old Kent Road, London)
- Pte. L. W. Paris, Royal West Surrey Reg. (E. Croydon)
- Pte. S. Park, Northumberland Fusiliers (Newcastle)
- Pte. J. Parker, Northumberland Fusiliers (Betside Furnace)
- Sgt. J. Parker, Royal Field Arty. (Wembley)
- Sgt. J. A. Parker, Royal Horse Arty. (Ilford)
- Sgt. R. Parker, Royal Lancaster Reg. (Galgate)
- L. Cpl. W. Parkin, Lincolnshire Reg. (Mansfield)
- L. Cpl. D. Parkinson, Gordon Highlanders (Stackstead)
- Pte. A. Parr, Leicestershire Reg. (Leicester)
- Sgt. W. H. Parr, South Staffordshire Reg. (Nottingham)
- Pte. H. H. Parry, Suffolk Reg. (Walthamstow)
- Cpl. E. W. Parsons, Grenadier Guards (Putney, London)
- L. Sgt. A. Partridge, Royal Warwickshire Reg. (Walsall)
- Pte. A. W. Pascoe, Royal Sussex Reg. (Paignton)
- Cpl. A. W. Passmore, Worcestershire Reg. (Lower Gornal)
- Pte. A. Patchett, Yorkshire Reg. (Bradford)
- Pte. E. W. Pateman, Coldstream Guards (Midhurst)
- Pte. R. B. Paterson, King's Own Scottish Borderers (Edinburgh)
- Pnr. W. Paterson, Royal Engineers (Hawick)
- L. Cpl. W. E. Paul, Dorsetshire Reg. (Dorchester)
- Pte. A. E. Payne, RAMC (Dover)
- Pte. B. W. Payne, Dragoon Guards (Faversham)
- Pte. E. Payne, Norfolk Reg. (Great Yarmouth)
- Tpr. E. W. Peach, Household Battalion (Bridport)
- L. Cpl. A. Peachey, Royal Engineers (Thurstou)
- Sgt. C. Peachy, West Riding Reg. (Bradford)
- Pte. E. E. Peacock, Northumberland Fusiliers (Belvedere)
- Cpl. A. Pearce, Shropshire Light Inf. (Oswes
- Bombr. G. Pearce, Royal Field Arty. (Southall)
- L. Cpl. J. Pearman, Essex Reg. (Chelsea)
- Gnr. A. H. Pearson, Royal Field Arty. (Rotherhithe)
- Pte. G. Pearson, West Riding Reg. (Tfaornaby-on-Tees)
- Pte. H. Pearson, South Staffordshire Reg. (Wolverhampton)
- Cpl. T. Pearson, Grenadier Guards (Manor Park)
- Pte. F. J. Peck, Coldstream Guards (Ryde)
- Pte. H. Peckham, Royal Warwickshire Reg. (Dorchester)
- L. Cpl. F. Peel, King's Own Scottish Borderers (Morley)
- Gnr. E. J. Pemberthy, Royal Garrison Arty. (Penarth)
- Gnr. H. Penlington, Royal Garrison Arty. (Liverpool)
- Pte. W. Pepper, East Surrey Reg. (Standon)
- L. Sgt. S. Perks, Coldstream Guards (Slough)
- L. Cpl. G. Perrin, Machine Gun Corps (Rye)
- Pte. W. G. Perren, Machine Gun Corp. (Enfield)
- Pte. A. W. Perry, Worcestershire Reg. (Marylelebone)
- Pte. J. Perry, Royal West Kent Reg. (Mon.)
- L. Sgt. P. R. Perry, Hampshire Reg. (Norwich)
- Sgt. W. Peters, Leicestershire Reg. (Leicester)
- Cpl. J. Phillingham, Lancashire Fusiliers (Openshaw)
- Sgt. E. J. Phillips, London Reg. (Islington)
- Pte. W. A. Phillips, Rifle Brigade (Walwtfrth)
- L. Cpl. E. J. Philpott, Machine Gun Corps (Eastney)
- Spr. G. T. Phizacklea, Royal Engineers (Mitcham)
- Cpl. A. C. Pickering, Gloucestershire Reg. (Bolton)
- Sgt. G. Pickering, East Lancashire Reg. (Lostock)
- Pte. E. Pickles, West Yorkshire Reg. (Bradford)
- Gnr. T. Pickup, Royal Field Arty. (Rawtenstall)
- Act. L. Cpl. D. Pidgely, Machine Gun Corps (Hurstpierpoint)
- Pte. J. F. Pierce, Royal West Surrey Reg. (Brighton)
- Spr. F. G. Pilgirem, Royal Engineers (Pritttewell)
- Pte. C. Pilgrim, Leicestershire Reg. (Leicester)
- Staff Sergeant Fitter E. Pilkington, Royal Field Arty. (Preston)
- Pte. J. Pilkington, York & Lancaster Reg. (Barnsley)
- Pte. J. Pirret, Gordon Highlanders (Newton Grange)
- Sgt. A. G. Pitcher, Nottinghamshire and Derbyshire Reg. (Marborough Meadows)
- Cpl. E. W. Pitt, Grenadier Guards (Rrightlingsea)
- L. Cpl. W. R. Pizzey, West Riding Reg. (Chapeltown, Sheffield)
- L. Cpl. C. E. Platt, Leicestershire Reg. (Leicester)
- Pte. H. Plowman, Yorkshire Reg. (Malton)
- Spr. B. Plows, Royal Engineers (Kippax)
- Cpl. C. Plumley, Norfolk Reg. (E. Northampton)
- Pte. W. Poile, Royal Sussex Reg. (Rye, Sussex)
- Spr. F. P. Poland, Royal Engineers (Worthing)
- Lt/Sergeant Pomroy, Suffolk Reg. (Walton)
- Pte. A. C. Pook, RAMC (Plymouth)
- Gnr. L. E. Poole, Royal Horse Arty. (Coventry)
- Cpl. F. V. Pope, Royal Field Arty. (Buxted)
- Sgt. S. Pope, Devonshire Reg. (Exmouth)
- L. Cpl. B. Porter, Middlesex Reg. (Chadwell Heath)
- Tr. H. Porter, Household Battalion (Sleaford)
- Sgt. A. J. Portman, Worcestershire Reg. (Netherton);
- Pte. T. G. Porton, Coldstream Guards (Horsham)
- L. Sgt. R. Potter, Machine Gun Corps (Markgate)
- Pte. A. Potter, Royal Scots (Grangepans)
- Onr. A. G. Potter, Royal Field Arty. (Wickham Market)
- Pte. J. J. Potts, Durham Light Inf. (Coxhoe)
- Cpl. T. Potts, Royal Garrison Arty. (Sunderland)
- Sgt. W. Poulton, South Staffordshire Reg. (Long Itchington)
- Sgt. E. Pounder, Royal Field Arty. (Sunderland)
- Gnr. A. J. Powell, Royal Horse Arty. (Goring-on-Thames)
- L. Sgt. F. Powell, West Yorkshire Reg. (Bradford)
- Gnr. H. Powell, Royal Garrison Arty. (Holywell)
- L. Sgt. J. Powell, Nottinghamshire and Derbyshire Reg. (Derby)
- Pte. J. Powell, East Yorkshire Reg. (South, Bank)
- Pte. R. H. Powell, Lincolnshire Reg. (Bethnal Green, London)
- Dvr. E. Power, Royal Field Arty. (Castleford)
- Pte. L. Pragnell, Hampshire Reg. (Romsey)
- L. Cpl. C. Pratt, RAMC (Birmingham)
- Pte. E. Pratt, Seaforth Highlanders (St. Andrews, Orkney)
- Cpl. G. E. Pratt, Royal Engineers (Norwich)
- Cpl. A. M. Precious, Machine Gun Corps (Bilton)
- Pte. S. E. Preeee, Shropshire Light Inf. (Condover, Salop)
- Sgt. A. Price, Royal Field Arty. (Hunslet)
- Pte. E. Price, Devonshire Reg. (Ottery S. Mary)
- Sgt. W. Price, RAMC (Brookend)
- Air Mechanic, 1st Class A. Prideaux, Royal Flying Corps (Bristol)
- Pte. G. E. Prigmore, London Reg. (Barusbury)
- Sgt. E. Prime, Machine Gun Corps (Garforth)
- Pte. J. A. Prior, Lancashire Fusiliers (Hounslow)
- Gnr. W. H. Prior, Royal Field Arty. (E. Gravesend)
- Pte. W. J. Pritchard, Nottinghamshire and Derbyshire Reg. (Islington, London)
- Cpl. T. Proffitt, Royal Field Arty. (Walsall)
- Act. Cpl. H. E. Prosser, London Reg. (Bermondsey)
- Pte. H. Proudfoot, Yorkshire Reg. (Sunderland)
- Pte. F. Prouse Devonshire Reg. (Clovelly)
- Sgt.. E. Prowse, Devonshire Reg. (Redruth)
- Pte. W. L. Pugh, Grenadier Guards (Ynyshir, Glamorgan)
- L. Cpl. F. H. Pullan, Yorkshire Reg. (Halifax)
- Pte. H. Pumfrey, Grenadier Guards (Upton-on-Severn)
- Pte. J. Purcell, Shropshire Light Inf. (Shrewsbury)
- Sgt. D. Purdie, Machine Gun Corps (Edinburgh)
- Pte. R. Purdon, King's Own Scottish Borderers (Giffnock)
- L. Cpl. H. Purkiss, Hampshire Reg. (Tattenham)
- Pte. T. S. Purves, Royal Scots Fusiliers (Edinburgh)
- Pte. F. A. Pye, Shropshire Light Inf. (WrockwardineWood)
- Gnr. N. Quigley, Royal Garrison Arty. (Cowes, Isle of Wight)
- Gnr. J. Quin, Royal Field Arty. (Gateshead-on-Tyne)
- Sgt. J. W. Quince, Lincolnshire Reg. (Gainsborough)
- Sgt. W. E. Quirk, Yorkshire Light Inf. (Wakefield)
- Act. Cpl. G. W. Racey, South Staffordshire Reg. (Wisbech)
- L. Cpl. J. Rae, Royal Scots (Linlithgow)
- Spr. W. Rae, Royal Engineers (Glasgow)
- Sgt. J. Rafferty, South Staffordshire Reg. (Wolverhampton)
- Gnr. A. T. Rainbow, Royal Garrison Arty. (East Ham)
- Pte. T. Raistrick, West Riding Reg. (Manningham)
- Pte. F. E. Ralph, Royal Warwickshire Reg. (Birmingham)
- Cpl. C. Ralphs, Northumberland Fusiliers (Stoke-on-Trent)
- Pte. F. Ramsdale, Nottinghamshire and Derbyshire Reg. (Nottingham)
- Pte. A. Ramsden, York & Lancaster Reg. (Sheffield)
- Pte. F. Ramsden, Leicestershire Reg. (Mansfield)
- Dvr. F. H. Randall, Royal Field Arty. (Manor Park, London)
- Gnr. L. Randall, Royal Garrison Arty. (Grantham)
- Cpl. F. Rathbone, East Yorkshire Reg. (Seaton Hirst)
- Spr. R. Rathbone, Royal Engineers (Newcastle upon Tyne)
- C.Q.M.S. G. J. Rawe, Labour Corps (Nottingham)
- Pte. W. Raybould, RAMC (Aston)
- Pte. W. G. T. Rayner, Royal West Surrey Reg. (Wandsworth, London)
- Pte. H. Raynor, Nottinghamshire and Derbyshire Reg. (New Sawley)
- Gnr. H. E. Read, Royal Field Arty. (Leigh-on-Sea)
- Cpl. of Horse V. H. Read, Household Battalion (Kilnhurst)
- L. Cpl. A. Redall, Military Foot Police (Nechells)
- L. Cpl. W. Redhead, Royal Lancaster Reg. (Lancaster)
- Pte. P. Redmond, Irish Guards (Ferns, County Wexford)
- Sgt. W. Redmor, Yorkshire Light Inf.
- Sgt. H. Redpath, Royal Highlanders (Perth)
- L. Cpl. J. Regan, London Reg. (Stepney)
- Pte. C. Reid, Seaforth Highlanders (Lossiemouth)
- Sgt. F. Reid, Royal West Surrey Reg. (Penge, London)
- Spr. J. Reid, Royal Engineers (Woolwich)
- Pte. J. P. Reid, Machine Gun Guards (Forfar)
- Pte. A. Rennison, Lancashire Fusiliers (Tollerton)
- Gnr. A. G. Rhodes, Royal Garrison Arty. (Tunbridge Wells)
- Gnr. H. Rhodes, Royal Field Arty. (Woodford Green)
- Sgt. H. L. Richards, Royal Garrison Arty. (E. Falmouth)
- Pte. W. E. P. Richards, Honourable Arty. Company (Marylebone)
- Sgt. E. H. Richardson, King's Royal Rifle Corps (Walsall)
- L. Cpl. T. Richardson, Argyll and Sutherland Highlanders (Glasgow)
- Pte. W. Richardson, Northumberland Fusiliers (Newcastle upon Tyne)
- Cpl. A. Riddles, Cheshire Reg. Duneton)
- Pte. A. Riding, Royal Warwickshire Reg. (Manchester)
- Pte. A. H. Riley, Royal Scots (Whitefield)
- Bombr. H. O. Ripley, Royal Garrison Arty. (E. Liverpool)
- L. Cpl. F. W. Rix, Suffolk Reg. (Bungay)
- Pte. T. Roach, York & Lancaster Reg. (Barnsley)
- Pte. F. Roberts, Leicestershire Reg. (Nuneaton)
- Sgt. G. A. Roberts, Leicestershire Reg. (Haggerstone)
- Pte. J. J. Roberts, London Reg. (Clapham Common)
- Sgt. D. Robertson, Gordon Highlanders (Stirling)
- Cpl. J. Robertson, Royal Highlanders (Scone)
- Sgt. W. Robertson, Royal Warwickshire Reg. (Romford)
- Pte. G. W. Robinson, Cameron Highlanders (Linlithgow)
- Spr. H. Robinson, Royal Engineers (Hulme)
- Sgt. J. Robinson, Yorkshire Reg. (York)
- L. Cpl. J. G. Robinson, Northumberland Fusiliers (Darlington)
- Pte. S. J. J. Robinson, Grenadier Guards (Bethnal Green, London)
- Pte. G. Robson, Northumberland Fusiliers (Witham)
- L. Cpl. J. Robson, Northumberland Fusiliers (Addison Colliery, Stella)
- Pte. J. Robson, Royal Fusiliers (Whitfield)
- Pnr. J. J. Robson, Royal Engineers (Manchester)
- Pte. R. Roden, Royal Lancaster Reg. (Chorley)
- Pte. J. Rodger, King's Own Scottish Borderers (Hawick)
- Pte. F. Rodgers, King's Royal Rifle Corps (Sheffield)
- Sgt. P. Rodgers, Machine Gun Corps (Huddersfield)
- Pte. A. Rogan, Royal Scots (Glasgow)
- Pte. C. J. Rogers, RAMC (Abbots Langley)
- Pte. G. W. Ronson, Coldstream Guards (Garstang)
- Cpl. D. E. Rose, Royal Garrison Arty. (Stratford)
- Pte. G. W. Rose, Suffolk Reg. (Chatteris)
- Sgt. W. Ross, Royal Field Arty. (Uphall)
- Pte. W. Ross, Border Reg. (Annan)
- Pte. O. Rossiter, Grenadier Guards (West Monkton)
- Gnr. P. Rotherham, Royal Field Arty. (Birkdale)
- Pte. J. Rounding, West Riding Reg. (Driffield)
- Pte. W. T. Rout, Rifle Brigade (London)
- Cpl. J. R. Routledge, Royal Field Arty. (Northallerton)
- Sgt. E. J. Rowe, Grenadier Guards (Walthamsfow)
- Cpl. R. W. Rowell, Northumberland Fusiliers (Littleburn Colliery)
- Gnr. A. H. Rowles, Royal Garrison Arty. (Bedwar)
- Bombr. R. Rowntree, Royal Field Arty. (HartJepool)
- Sgt. J. Roy, Gordon Highlanders (Lanarkhill)
- L. Cpl. L. Royle, Manchester Reg. (Manchester)
- Sgt. W. J. Rumming, Coldstream Guards (Coine, Wiltshire)
- Pte. G. Rushforth, Border Reg. (Newcastle upon Tyne)
- Pte. J. Rushford, Argyll and Sutherland Highlanders (Avonbridge)
- L. Cpl. J. Rushton, Royal Lancaster Reg. (Blackburn)
- Pte. G. Russell, Highland Light Inf. (Holytown)
- Pte. J. Russell, Cameron Highlanders (Dundee)
- Cpl. W. Russell, Royal Field Arty. (South Shields)
- Pte. H. Rust, Gordon Highlanders (Aberdeen)
- Sgt. R. C. Ruth, Royal Field Arty. (Bradford)
- L. Cpl. A. J. Ryan, Royal Lancaster Reg. (Worthing)
- 2nd Cpl. J. F. Rycroft, Royal Engineers (Seacombe)
- Spr. J. Rylance, Royal Engineers (Manchester)
- Sgt. G. H. Saddington, Royal West Kent Reg. (Canning Town)
- Pte. W. C. Sage, East Kent Reg. (Thornbury)
- Cpl. A. J. Sale, Bedfordshire Reg. (Shiffprd)
- Dvr. A. Salmon, Royal Field Arty. (Walworth, London)
- L. Cpl. W. Salmon, Royal Sussex Reg. (Bishops Stortford)
- Gnr. W. Salt, Royal Field Arty. (Walthamstow)
- Pte. T. Samson, Seaforth Highlanders (Kilmarnock)
- Pte. J. G. Sandbrook, RAMC (Stockton-on-Tees)
- Gnr. A. Sanders, Royal Field Arty. (Hinckley)
- Cpl. C. H. Saunders, Border Reg. (Wimbledon)
- Pte. E. G. Saunders, Grenadier Guards (Chorleywood)
- Pte. A. Savage, Royal West Kent Reg. (Southall)
- Cpl. R. Saville, Royal Field Arty. (Ipswich)
- Pte. C. W. Scase, Suffolk Reg. (Great Ashfield)
- Pte. T. W. Schofield, West Riding Reg. (Bradford)
- L.C. A. C. Scott, Gordon Highlanders (Aberdeen)
- Sgt. F. Scott, Gordon Highlanders (Aberdeen)
- Pte. H. J. Scott, Army Service Corps (Purley)
- Pte. R. Scott, Yorkshire Light Inf. (Mindrum, N.B.)
- Pte. A. H. Scroggs, Grenadier Guards (West Hendon)
- Spr. J. J. Scuffil, Royal Engineers (Dublin)
- Pte. D. Scutt, RAMC (Portslade)
- Pte. H. J. Seago, Norfolk Reg. (Great Yarmouth)
- Pte. G. W. Seal, RAMC (Berkhamstead)
- Air Mechanic, 1st Class E. Searson, Royal Flying Corps (Millom)
- Sgt. F. Sears, Grenadier Guards (Pimlico, London)
- Cpl. T. Searson, Royal Garrison Arty. (Leicester)
- Pte. C. Sebry, RAMC (Waiworth)
- Capt. T. Seddon, Royal Engineers (Pendlebury)
- Sgt. W. G. Selfe, North Staffordshire Reg. (Burton-on-Trent)
- Pte. L. Selwyn, Machine Gun Corps (Minsterworth)
- Gnr. P. Senior, Royal Field Arty. (Batley)
- Pte. J. Sergent, RAMC (Blackpool)
- Act. L. Cpl. H. Settle, West Riding Reg. (Oldham)
- Sgt. A. F. Seymour, Machine Gun Corps (Deptford)
- Pte. W. E. Seymour, London Reg. (Catford, London)
- Pte. G. Shakeshaft, RAMC (Wellington)
- Sgt. H. Sharp, Royal Field Arty. (Bradford)
- L. Cpl. J. Sharman, Military Foot Police (Sandhurst)
- Gnr. T. S. Sharman, Royal Field Arty. (Woolverstone, near Ipswich)
- Pte. A. Shaw, West Riding Reg. (Bradford)
- Pte. G. Shaw, Machine Gun Corps (Droylsden)
- Sgt. J. Shaw, Lancashire Fusiliers (Patricroft)
- Pte. S. H. Shaw, Nottinghamshire and Derbyshire Reg. (Nottingham)
- Bombr. J. Sheard, Royal Field Arty. (Leeds)
- PK. W. E. Shearing, Royal Sussex Reg. (Granbourne)
- Pte. G. Sheldon, South Staffordshire Reg. (West Bromwich)
- Pte. L. Shellard, Oxfordshire & Buckinghamshire Light Inf. (Banbury)
- Pte. J. Shelley, Labour Corps (Fenton, Stoke-on-Trent)
- Sgt. R. Shepherd, Royal Field Arty. (Beverley)
- Pte. S. Shepherd, RAMC (Dunston-on-Tyne)
- Pte. R. F. Sherfield, Grenadier Guards (Bentley, Hampshire.)
- L. Cpl. A. E. Sherratt, West Riding Reg. (Huddersfield)
- Gnr. H. Sherratt, Royal Field Arty. (Brown Edge)
- Pte. Shields, Machine Gun Corps (Belfast)
- Sgt. T. Shields, Royal Lancaster Reg. (Manchester)
- Dvr. G. S. Ship, Royal Horse Arty. (Loddon)
- Dvr. J. T. Shipman, Royal Field Arty. (Sparkbrook)
- Pte. A. Shipp, Royal West Surrey Reg. (Haverhill)
- Pte. F. J. Shirley, Royal Warwickshire Reg. (Handsworth)
- Gnr. P. Shovlin, Royal Garrison Arty. (Campsie)
- Pte. T. Sidley, London Reg. (Islington)
- Dvr. G. Simblett, Royal Engineers (E. Jarrow)
- L. Cpl. R. A. Simcock, Royal Berkshire Reg. (Liverpool)
- L. Cpl. E. Simcox, South Staffordshire Reg. (Oldbury)
- Pte. W. Simcox, Shropshire Light Inf. (Newport)
- Pte. J. B. Simmons, Royal Fusiliers (Kentish Town)
- Pte. G. Simms, Northumberland Fusiliers (Grangetown)
- Pte. H. J. Simons, Middlesex Reg. (St. Ives)
- Pte. B. Simpson, Yorkshire Light Inf. (Sheffield)
- Pte. D. Simpson, Gordon Highlanders (Cardendean, Fife)
- Pte. H. Simpson, Liverpool Reg. (Liverpool)
- Pte. J. Simpson, Coldstream Guards (Accrington)
- Pte. R. Simpson, Machine Gun Corps (Lochgelly)
- Dvr. W. Sims, Royal Field Arty. (Bambledon)
- Dvr. W. J. Skelton, Royal Field Arty. (Lambeth)
- Cpl. W. H. Skinner, Royal Welsh Fusiliers (E. London, Royal Engineers)
- Sgt. S. W. Skoyles, Nottinghamshire and Derbyshire Reg. (Great Yarmouth)
- Pte. W. E. Skyrme, Labour Corps (Clifton-on-Teme, Worcester)
- Pte. J. G. Slack, York & Lancaster Reg. (Thornhill)
- Pte. G. Slater, Coldstream Guards (Sunderlanct)
- Pte. J. H. Slater, Border Reg. (Liverpool)
- Pte. W. Slater, King's Royal Rifle Corps (Wheatley)
- Sgt. A. Sleath, Leicestershire Reg. (Rothley)
- Pte. H. T. Sloan, Yorkshire Reg. (South Shields)
- Pte. S. Sloan, RAMC (Hamilton)
- Cpl. J. H. Sloman, Royal Welsh Fusiliers (Kingsbridge)
- Pte. J. Small, York & Lancaster Reg. (Sheffield)
- Pte. R. T. Small, Liverpool Reg. (Liverpool)
- L. Sgt. R. D. Smartt, Royal West Kent Reg. (Walthamstow)
- Cpl. J. J. Smelt, York & Lancaster Reg. (Rotherham)
- Cpl. A. Smith, RAMC (Harwich)
- Pte. A. Smith, Royal Warwickshire Reg. (St. Neots)
- Pte. A. E. Smith, RAMC (Halifax)
- Cpl. A. G. Smith, Machine Gun Corps (W. Croydon)
- Sgt. C. E. Smith, Essex Reg. (Chatham)
- Pte. E. Smith, East Surrey Reg. (Sutton)
- Pte. F. Smith, West Yorkshire Reg. (York)
- C.Q.M.S. F. T. Smith, West Yorkshire Reg. (W. Kensington)
- Pte. G. Smith, East Surrey Reg. (TE. l Codford)
- Sgt. H. Smith, London Reg. (Stepney)
- Pte. H. Smith, West Yorkshire Reg. (York)
- Pte. H. Smith, Norfolk Reg. (Clapham Park)
- Pte. H. Smith, Royal Warwickshire Reg. (Tamworth)
- Dvr. H. S. Smith, Royal Horse Arty. (Stockton-on-Tees)
- Pte. J. Smith, Yorkshire Light Inf. (Dundee)
- Pte. J. Smith, South Staffordshire Reg. (Birmingham)
- Sgt. J. Smith, Royal Field Arty. (Lye, Stourbridge)
- L. Cpl. J. Smith, Nottinghamshire and Derbyshire Reg. (Wolverhampton)
- Pte. J. E. Smith, Lincolnshire Reg. (Spalding)
- Pte. R. Smith, Royal Warwickshire Reg., attd. Machine Gun Company (Bedford)
- Pte. S. Smith, Oxfordshire & Buckinghamshire Light Inf. (Oxford)
- Pte. T. Smith, Gloucestershire Reg. (Bristol)
- Act. Sgt. T. C. Smith, Royal West Kent Reg. (Dockhead, London)
- Cpl. W. Smith, Royal Engineers (Harrogate)
- L. Cpl. W. Smith, Royal Welsh Fusiliers (Connahs Quay, N. Wales)
- Pte. W. Smith, Yorkshire Reg. (Earl Shilton)
- Sgt. J. A. Smithson, Lancashire Fusiliers (Northfleet)
- Cpl. F. Smoothy, Machine Gun Corps (Danbury)
- Gnr. R. E. Snead, Royal Garrison Arty. (Preston-on-Tyne)
- Spr. A. Snell, Royal Engineers (Torpoint)
- Pte. S. T. Snelling, Machine Gun Corps (St. Mary)
- Pte. J. Snowball, Durham Light Inf. (Lower, Wellington)
- Pte. J. Snowden, West Riding Reg. (Bingley)
- Sgt. J. Sockett, Lancashire Fusiliers (Skelmersdale)
- Pur E. Sorensen, Royal Engineers (Cork)
- Pte. G. Souter, Leicestershire Reg. (Leicester)
- Pte. C. Southgate, Royal Warwickshire Reg. (Bury St. Edmunds)
- Tpr. A. H. Spalding, Household Battalion (Derby)
- Cpl. A. J. Sparkes, Middlesex Reg. (Taunton)
- Air Mechanic, 1st Class C. B. Spicer, Royal Flying Corps (Dublin)
- Pte. W. W. Spicer, Grenadier Guards (Wareham)
- L. Cpl. A. Spinks, Machine Gun Corps (Islington)
- Pte. N. Spooner, Northumberland Fusiliers (Ashwell Plough)
- L. Cpl. W. T. Spraggs, Manchester Reg. (Manchester)
- L. Cpl. W. W. Spriggs, Royal Lancaster Reg. (Ashton-on-Mersey)
- Pte. C. Spurr, York & Lancaster Reg. (Gawber)
- Sgt. F. J. Squire, Royal Field Arty. (Boscastle)
- Spr. W. J. Staines, Royal Engineers (Walworth)
- Cpl. W. Stainsby, Royal Engineers (Nottingham)
- Pte. A. G. Stallard, Dorsetshire Reg. (Kentish Town)
- Pte. H. Stallard, RAMC (Port Sunlight)
- Sgt. F. Stancliffe, Machine Gun Corps (Kirkheaton)
- Pte. S. J. Staniford, RAMC (Berkhamstead)
- Pte. J. H. Starbuck, Argyll and Sutherland Highlanders (Bardon Hill)
- Pte. S. Start, Machine Gun Corps (Southwark)
- L. Cpl. A. E.V. Statham, Royal Engineers (Norwich)
- L. Cpl. W. G. Steadman, Seaforth Highlanders (Crieff)
- Gnr. H. C. Steele, Royal Field Arty. (Aston)
- Cpl. R. J. Steele, Royal Engineers (Manchester)
- Sgt. J. Steeple, York & Lancaster Reg. (Rotherham)
- Pte. A. Stenning, Grenadier Guards (E. Dorking)
- Fitter J. W. Stephen, Royal Field Arty. (Aberdeen)
- Sgt. R. W. Stephens, Shropshire Light Inf. (Hereford)
- Pte. H. Stevenson, Grenadier Guards (Doncaster)
- Gnr. G. Steward, Royal Garrison Arty. (Birmingham)
- Pte. P. Stewart, Essex Reg. (E. Cape.Town)
- Act. Sgt. J. F. Stiff, Suffolk Reg. (Bury St. Edmunds)
- Gnr. L. T. Stillman, Royal Field Arty. (Chesham)
- L. Cpl. S. Stirling, Gordon Highlanders (Motherwell)
- Pte. T. H. Stirling, Seaforth Highlanders (Perth)
- Sgt. G. Stock, Royal Garrison Arty. (Cambridge)
- Cpl. C. S. Stockbridge, London Reg. (Regents Park)
- Cpl. C. Stockdale, Liverpool Reg. (Liverpool)
- Sgt. W. H. Stbckdale, Royal Field Arty. (Kirkdale)
- Gnr. H. H. Stokes, Royal Field Arty. (West Bromwich)
- Pte. W. Stokes, South Staffordshire Reg. (Darlaston)
- Sgt. C. W. Stolfer, Machine Gun Corps (Lowestoft)
- Dvr. F. G. Stone, Royal Field Arty. (South-sea)
- 2nd Cpl. J. Stones, Royal Engineers (Sheffield)
- Sgt. H. Stoppard, Nottinghamshire and Derbyshire Reg. (Chesterfield)
- L. Cpl. S. Stopps, Nottinghamshire and Derbyshire Reg. (Huthwaite)
- Pte. W. Storey, Royal Sussex Reg. (Hoibeach)
- Pte. J. G. Stormont, RAMC (Sunderland)
- Pte. T. Street, Coldstream Guards (Ashton-under-Lyne)
- Pte. W. Stringer, Yorkshire Light Inf. (Dewsbury)
- Able Seaman A. Stuart, Royal Naval Volunteer Reserve (Crosshill)
- Sgt. T. Stuart, Manchester Reg. (Pemberton)
- Pte. H. T. Stubbings, Royal Sussex Reg. (Bishops Stortford)
- Spr. G. J. C. Stumbler, Royal Engineers (Birmingham)
- Gnr. I. C. N. Sturgeon, Royal Garrison Arty. (Hepworth)
- Pte. H. Styler, Worcestershire Reg. (Redditch)
- Cpl. D. Styles, Machine Gun Corps (Cambridge)
- Sgt. E. N. Sailings, London Reg. (Leytonstone)
- L. Cpl. J. W. Sunderland, West Riding Reg. (Hebden Bridge)
- Dvr. R. Sutherland, Royal Field Arty. (Everton)
- Pte. T. Button, South Staffordshire Reg. (Tipton)
- L. Cpl. R. Swain, Devonshire Reg. (Rochdale)
- Pte. R. A. Swales, RAMC (York)
- Pte. D. H. Swanston, Machine Gun Guards (Leith)
- Sgt. W. T. G. Swarfield, Royal West Surrey Reg. (Croydon)
- Cpl. E. Sweeney, Royal Garrison Arty. (Sligo)
- Pte. J. Sweet, Yorkshire Reg. (Shipley)
- Act. Sgt. S. J. Sweet, Military Foot Police (Devonport)
- Spr. H. Swift, Royal Engineers (Bath)
- Pte. J. Swift, Yorkshire Reg. (Huddersfield)
- Pte. A. Swindles, Royal Lancaster Reg. (Salford)
- Gnr. J. T. Swinhoe, Royal Field Arty. (Birkenhead)
- Fitter Staff Sergeant J. Sym, Royal Garrison Arty. (Kilmarnock)
- Pte. C. Tandy, Lancashire Fusiliers (Manchester)
- Bombr. J. H. Tanner, Royal Field Arty. (Chelsea)
- Cpl. H. Tannahill, Royal Irish Rifles (Dunmurry)
- Spr. A. J. Tarbath, Royal Engineers (Hereford)
- Bombr. J. Tate, Royal Field Arty. (Monkseaton)
- L. Cpl. H. G. Tavener, Somerset Light Inf. (Bristol)
- Sgt. A. V. Taylor, Royal Field Arty. (Hayes)
- Sgt. C. H. Taylor, Essex Reg. (Witham)
- Pte. F. Taylor, Machine Gun Corps (Hollingwood)
- Pte. G. H. Taylor, Northumberland Fusiliers (Norton)
- Pte. H. Taylor, Royal Warwickshire Reg. (Coventry)
- Pte. J. Taylor, Cameron Highlanders (Edinburgh)
- Pte. J. Taylor, Yorkshire Light Inf. (Ferrybridge)
- Pte. J. W. Taylor, West Riding Reg. (Leeds)
- Cpl. M. V. Taylor, Machine Gun Guards (Whitby)
- Sgt.l. R. Taylor, Royal Field Arty. (East Dhinnock)
- Gnr. S. Taylor, Royal Field Arty. (Earlsfield)
- Pte. S. Taylor, Northumberland Fusiliers (Hulme)
- Cpl. V. Taylor, West Riding Reg. (Brighouse)
- L. Cpl. W. H. Taylor, Worcestershire Reg. (Brierley Hill)
- Sgt. H. Taylorson, Royal Garrison Arty. (Sacristan)
- Spr. W. Taziker, Royal Engineers (formerly Seaforth Highlanders) (Atherstone)
- Sgt. F. J. Tebbitt, Royal West Kent Reg. (Kelvedon)
- Pte. J. Telfer, Border Reg. (Whitehaven)
- Pte. J. T. Telford, Leicestershire Reg. (Loughborough)
- Dvr. J. Terry, Royal Field Arty. (Hackney Wick)
- Dvr. W. Terry, Royal Field Arty. (Charing)
- Cpl. H. Tetlow, Machine Gun Corps (Stockport)
- Pte. J. Thackeray, Yorkshire Reg. (Middlesbrough)
- Act. Bombr. V. G. Thew, Royal Garrison Arty. (Harrogate)
- Pte. L. Thistlethwaite, Yorkshire Reg. (Bradford)
- Pte. R. A. Thorn, British West Indies Reg. (Jamaica)
- Bombr. A. Thomas, Royal Field Arty. (Camberwell Green, London)
- L. Cpl. D. Thomas, West Yorkshire Reg. (Chester-le-Street)
- L. Cpl. G. Thomas, Royal Engineers (Highbury Park, London)
- Pte. H. Thomas, Middlesex Reg. (Hoxton)
- Cpl. H. G. Thomas, Royal Welsh Fusiliers (Victoria Park, London)
- Bombr. W. Thomas, Royal Field Arty. (Camberwell)
- Cpl. A. G. Thompson, Grenadier Guards (Bristol)
- 2nd Cpl. A. W. Thompson, Royal Engineers (Norwich)
- Dvr. H. Thompson, Royal Field Arty. (Colchester)
- L. Cpl. J. Thompson, Royal Fusiliers (Birmingham)
- Sgt. J. T. Thompson, Grenadier Guards (Ipswich)
- Pte. W. Thompson, Lincolnshire Reg. (Leeds)
- Sgt. W, Thompson, London Reg. (Glasgow)
- L. Cpl. W. Thompson, Machine Gun Corps (Woodford Bridge)
- Pte. S. Thompstone, Royal Welsh Fusiliers (Manchester)
- Pte. D. Thomson, RAMC (Dundee)
- L. Cpl. G. Thomson, Machine Gun Corps (Halifax)
- Sgt. L. I. Thomson, Royal Garrison Arty. (Newnham)
- Pte. W. Thomson, Gordon Highlanders (Glasgow)
- Pte. G. Thorley, Nottinghamshire and Derbyshire Reg. (Newcastle, Staffs.)
- Pte. T. Thornley, Cheshire Reg. (Bishop's Castle)
- Gnr. W. Thornton, Royal Field Arty. (Bramley)
- Pte. F. H. Threadgold, Military Mounted Police (Sarsham)
- Cpl. G. Thurlbeck, Royal Field Arty. (Darlington)
- Dvr. W. C. Thurston, Royal Engineers (Downham)
- Cpl. J. Timson, Royal Field Arty. (Hull)
- Pte. J. Tinlin, King's Own Scottish Borderers (Berwick)
- Pte. S. Tinney, Duke of Cornwall's Light Inf. (Par)
- Cpl. H. F. Tinsley, Leicestershire Reg. (Leicester)
- L. Sgt. R. Tippen, Gordon Highlanders (Newmilns)
- Act. Bombr. G. A. Toft, Royal Garrison Arty. (Seaham Harbour)
- Pte. P. Toman, Seaforth Highlanders (Stranraer)
- Pnr. F. Tomey, Royal Engineers (Bloomsbury)
- Pte. B. Tomlinson, Nottinghamshire and Derbyshire Reg. (Clown)
- Pte. J. Tomlinson, Grenadier Guards (E. Malpas)
- L. Cpl. S. Tonkin, Honourable Arty. Company (Falmouth)
- L. Cpl. E. P. Toole, West Yorkshire Reg. (West Hartlepool)
- Dvr. G. H. Toon, Royal Field Arty. (Atherstone)
- L. Cpl. HQ Towers, Royal Lancaster Reg. (Dalton-in-Furness)
- Pte. H. G. Townshend, Norfolk Reg. (Hempnale)
- Cpl. H. Towse, East Yorkshire Reg. (Hull)
- Pte. A. Tran, King's Own Scottish Borderers (Dundee)
- L. Cpl. W. Treadwell, Gloucestershire Reg. (Atherstone)
- Sgt. E. S. Tresidder, Royal Field Arty. (South Woodford)
- Sgt. W. H. A. Trew, Duke of Cornwall's Light Inf. (Finsbury Park, London)
- Pte. J. F. Trigg, London Reg. (Islington)
- Pnr. J. Trillian DCM Royal Engineers (Chiswick, London)
- Gnr. H. Triplow, Royal Field Arty. (Stotfold)
- Sgt. J. Troto, Royal Horse Arty. (Nr. Amersham)
- Pte. R. Trotter, Scots Guards (Lochgelly)
- Cpl. F. Trueman, Machine Gun Corps (Cloncarish)
- Cpl. I. Tuckey, Duke of Cornwall's Light Inf. (Rushden)
- L. Cpl. W. Tullie, Cameron Highlanders (Glasgow)
- Pte. J. Turnbull, Cameron Highlanders (Gilmerton)
- Gnr. W. Turnbull, Royal Field Arty. (Pallion)
- L. Cpl. A. Turner, Royal Scots (Dolphinton, N.B.)
- Pte. A. Turner, Royal West Kent Reg. (Fulham)
- Pte. A. Turner, Nottinghamshire and Derbyshire Reg. (Blackwell)
- L. Cpl. E. B. Turner, Yorkshire Reg. (Leeds)
- Cpl. F. Turner, Machine Gun Corps (Rochdale)
- Pte. F. C. Turner, Army Cyclist Corps (Sowerby Bridge)
- Cpl. G. Turner, Hampshire Reg. (Birmingham)
- L. Cpl. H. H. Turner, RAMC (Morley)
- Pte. J. Turner, Gordon Highlanders (Brechin)
- Pte. J. P. Turner, Northumberland Fusiliers (Long Eaton)
- Dvr. L. Turpin, Royal Field Arty. (Cambridge)
- Pte. W. Tween, East Surrey Reg. (Nr. Ongar)
- Spr. F. Tyler, Royal Engineers (Liverpool)
- Cpl. P. Tynan, Irish Guards (Gladdah)
- Sgt. L. Type, Machine Gun Guards (Exmouth)
- Pte. H. T. Tyrrell, Royal West Kent Reg. (Leiston)
- Gnr. N. Underwood, Royal Garrison Arty. (Cobham)
- Sgt. G. Upton, Cameron Highlanders (Staffs.)
- Pte. D. G. Urquhart, Gordon Highlanders (Inverness)
- Sgt. H. Uttley DCM Nottinghamshire and Derbyshire Reg. (Rotherham)
- Gnr. C. Vallender, Royal Garrison Arty. (Lichfield)
- Spr. W. Vartey, Royal Engineers (Normanton)
- Pte. J. Varty, Coldstream Guards (Dunston)
- Act. Cpl. G. Vaughan, Royal West Kent Reg. (E. Maidstone)
- Sgt. G. E. Vdcary, Royal Sussex Reg. (Lewes)
- Gnr. C. A. Vieweg, Royal Garrison Arty. (Billericay)
- Gnr. J. H. Vincent, Royal Field Arty. (Jarrow)
- Pte. C. Viney, RAMC (Stanford)
- Pte. G. Voce, Grenadier Guards (Stamford Hill, London)
- Sgt. R. W. Voller, Royal Garrison Arty. (Hastings)
- Pte. W. Voyce, Grenadier Guards (Gloucester)
- Bombr. A. Wagg, Royal Field Arty. (Loughton)
- Pte. E. Waghorn, Royal West Kent Reg. (Woolwich)
- Dvr. H. Wainwright, Royal Field Arty. (Sheffield)
- L. Cpl. W. Wainwright, Grenadier Guards (Mickleover)
- Sgt. L. J. Waldram, Durham Light Inf. (Nottingham)
- Pte. A. Wale, Coldstream Guards (Coventry)
- Pte. C. Walgate, Leicestershire Reg. (Nottingham)
- L. Cpl. . F. Walker, York & Lancaster Reg. (Kilnhurst)
- Pte. J. Walker, Yorkshire Reg. (Bradford)
- Sgt. J. W. Walker, Yorkshire Light Inf. (Castleford)
- Act. Sgt. C. Wallis, Lincolnshire Reg. (Bethnal Green, London)
- Pte. A. Wallond, Royal West Kent Reg. (West, Farleigh)
- Bte. C. Walsh, West Riding Reg. (Hebdem Bridge)
- Pte. A. Walters, Argyll and Sutherland Highlanders
- Sgt. W. W. G. Walters, Machine Gun Corps (Yarmouth)
- Sgt. B. Walton, Grenadier Guards (Grantham)
- Cpl. G. A. Walton, Yorkshire Reg. (London
- Pte. A. A. Ward, Leicestershire Reg. (Leicester)
- L. Cpl. F. Ward, Military Foot Police (Selby)
- Pte. G. Ward, Shropshire Light Inf. (Oakengates)
- Pte. H. Ward, Suffolk Reg. (Dronfield)
- Cpl. J. F. Ward, RF.A. (Battersea)
- Pte. R. Ward, RAMC (Dereham)
- Cpl. W. Ward, Royal Garrison Arty. (Northampton)
- Dvr. J. Ware, Royal Field Arty. (Abercynon, Glamorgan)
- L. Cpl. T. L. Ware, Devonshire Reg. (Ottery St. Mary)
- Tpr. A. E. Warner, Household Battalion (Englefield Green)
- Pte. A. Warren, Leicestershire Reg. (Croft)
- L. Cpl. H. C. Warren, Royal Engineers (Parkstone)
- Sgt. J. E. Warren, York & Lancaster Reg. (Woodhouse)
- Pte. S. Warrington, Northumberland Fusiliers (Altrincham)
- Pte. F. Waterfield, Royal West Surrey Reg. (Redhill)
- Pte. H. Waterhouse, Northumberland Fusiliers (Burley)
- Act. Cpl. F. Waters, Nottinghamshire and Derbyshire Reg. (Nottingham)
- Sgt. F. G. Waters, Rifle Brigade (Aldershot)
- L. Cpl. G. C. F. Waters, Royal Sussex Reg. (Wadhurst)
- Sgt. A. Waterworth, Machine Gun Corps (Oldham)
- Pte. T. Watkins, Northumberland Fusiliers (Swalxwell)
- Sgt. A. Watmough, Royal Field Arty. (Leeds)
- Pte. F. Watson, Labour Corps (Long-Bennington)
- Pte. H. Watson, Norfolk Reg. (King's Lynn)
- Cpl. J. E. Watson, Royal Sussex Reg. (Hastings)
- Pte. M. Watson, Border Reg. (Arlecdon)
- Cpl. W. Watson, East Yorkshire Reg. (Hull)
- Cpl. A. S. Watts, Grenadier Guards (West Torwood, London)
- L. Cpl. J. Wayburn, Devonshire Reg. (Lynton)
- Pte. L. B. Weatherhead, Machine Gun Guards (Dundee)
- Pte. C. Webb, Suffolk Reg. (Sproughton)
- L. Cpl. E. Webb, West Yorkshire Reg. (Ashwell)
- Pte. W. Webb, Royal Warwickshire Reg. (Handsworth)
- Sgt. A. Webster, Royal Lancaster Reg. (Burnley)
- Pte. C. D. Webster, Nottinghamshire and Derbyshire Reg. (Nottingham)
- Gnr. F. C. Webster, Royal Garrison Arty. (Dartford)
- Dvr. J. Webster, Royal Field Arty. (Liverpool)
- Pte. A. E. Wells, South Staffordshire Reg. (Birmingham)
- Cpl. E. H. Wells, Royal West Kent Reg. (Henley-on-Thames)
- Pte. W. Wells, Oxfordshire & Buckinghamshire Light Inf. (Banbury)
- Pte. F. Welton, Northumberland Fusiliers (Bury St. Edmunds)
- Gnr. J. Welsh, Headquarters, Royal Field Arty. (Kensington)
- Pte. J. Welsh, King's Own Scottish Borderers (Coldstream)
- Pte. P. Welsh, West Yorkshire Reg. (York)
- Dvr. E. Wendrop, Royal Field Arty. (Limehouse)
- Sgt. H. W. Wentworth, Grenadier Guards (Thame)
- Pte. A. E. Weston, Worcestershire Reg. (Worcester)
- L. Cpl. A. Westwood, Royal Engineers (Rotherham)
- Cpl. J. Westwood, King's Royal Rifle Corps (Oldhill)
- Pte. J. Wetherton, Coldstream Guards (Pontypridd)
- Pte. M. Whale, Machine Gun Corps (Taunton)
- Pnr. T. Whalley, Royal Engineers (Chorley)
- Sgt. H. G. Want, Royal Field Arty. (Hungerford)
- L. Cpl. J. Wharton, Durham Light Inf. (Fencehouses)
- Sgt. J. Wheeler, Royal Field Arty. (Bicester)
- L. Cpl. G. Whiles, Nottinghamshire and Derbyshire Reg. (Newark-on-Trent)
- Pte. E. Whitbread, Machine Gun Corps (Sandy)
- Pte. F. Whitby, Suffolk Reg. (March)
- Dvr. A. White, Royal Field Arty. (Exmouth)
- Gnr. A. J. White, Royal Garrison Arty. (E. Hull)
- L. Cpl. B. White, South Staffordshire Reg. (Wolverhampton)
- Pte. G. E. White, Royal Scots Fusiliers (Derby)
- Pte. R. White, Leicestershire Reg. (Leicester)
- Act. Bombr. S. White, Royal Garrison Arty. (E. Devonport)
- Pte. W. White, York & Lancaster Reg. (Sheffield)
- Sgt. F. Whitehead, Royal Engineers (Stretford)
- Sgt. T. Whitehead, Royal Garrison Arty. (Finslmry Park, London)
- Sgt. A. G. Whiteman, Royal Sussex Reg. (Sandy)
- L. Cpl. C. Whitmore, Duke of Cornwall's Light Inf. (Birmingham)
- Pte. H. Whithell, Gloucestershire Reg. (Bristol)
- Cpl. G. Whittaker, Leicestershire Reg. (Shirebrook)
- Pte. C. Wnytje, Royal Highlanders (Guardbridge)
- Spr. W. G. Wiggins, Royal Engineers (Ladywell, London)
- Sgt. C. A. Wilcox, Gloucestershire Reg. (Bristol)
- Cpl. C. Wilde, T. R. Battalion, attd. Machine Gun Corps (Heaton Norris)
- Pte. H. Wilde, London Reg. (Lefe, London)
- Sgt. J. Wilde, Machine Gun Guards (Cardiff)
- Spr. W. J. Wildgoose, Royal Engineers (Sheffield)
- Pte. G. H. Wilding, Royal Warwickshire Reg. (Monmouth)
- Sgt. A. H. Wileman, Royal Sussex Reg. (Luton, Bedfordshire)
- Sgt. E. Wilkinson, Royal Field Arty. (Openshaw)
- Sgt. E. Wilkinson, RAMC (New Wortley)
- Pte. J. Wilkinson, Coldstream Guards (Ulverston)
- Pte. T. H. Wilkinson, Royal Lancaster Reg. (Ulverston)
- Dvr. J. Will, Army Service Corps (E. Dundee)
- Cpl. C. Willatt, Coldstream Guards (Exmbuth)
- Pte. P. R. Willcocks, East Kent Reg. (Manchester)
- Sgt. A. J. Williams, Royal Field Arty. (Colchester)
- L. Cpl. F. Williams, Gloucestershire Reg. (Newent)
- Pte. G. Williams, Machine Gun Corps (Golcar)
- Pte. J. Williams, Duke of Cornwall's Light Inf. (Truro)
- Pte. J. F. Williams, RAMC (Newton Abbot)
- Sgt. J. N. Williams, Devonshire Reg. (Rochdale)
- Pte. T. Williams, Royal Warwickshire Reg. (Cannock)
- Chief Petty Ofc. W. G. Williams RN (Gosport)
- Pte. G. W. Williamson, Coldstream Guards, attd. Machine Gun Guards (Feltham)
- Pte. A. Willis, Northumberland Fusiliers (Manningham)
- Cpl. B. Wilson, West Riding Reg. (Halifax)
- Gnr. E. Wilson, Royal Field Arty. (Patricroft)
- L. Cpl. H. Wilson, Durham Light Inf. (Sunderland)
- Pte. J. R. Wilson, York & Lancaster Reg. (Beverley)
- L. Cpl. W. Wiltshire, Hampshire Reg. (Portsmouth)
- Cpl. W. H. Wiltshire, Coldstream Guards (Plaistow, London)
- Pte. H. Wimblett, West Riding Reg. (Keighley)
- Pte. A. Wing, York & Lancaster Reg. (West Melton)
- L. Cpl. S. Wingfield, Northumberland Fusiliers (Pirixori)
- Spr. J. Winkle, Royal Engineers (Willenhall)
- Pte. J. Winn, Hampshire Reg. (Taunton)
- Pte. J. Winter, King's Own Scottish Borderers (Castleford)
- Pte. S. Winter, Leicestershire Reg. (Atherstone)
- Sgt. W. H. V. Winter, East Yorkshire Reg. (Market Weighton)
- Spr. H. Winton, Royal Engineers (Brighton)
- Pte. W. Wisdom, Royal West Surrey Reg. (Guildford)
- Spr. E. Witcutt, Royal Engineers (Walsall)
- Cpl. T. Withers, Royal West Surrey Reg. (Leicester)
- Gnr. W. G. Wollcbtt, Royal Field Arty. (Bridgwater)
- L. Cpl. A. Wolstenholme, Machine Gun Corpy (Blackburn)
- Pte. T. H. Womack, Suffolk Reg. (Kelsall)
- Cpl. A. Wood, Royal Lancaster Reg. (Lancaster)
- Pte. A. Wood, Dorsetshire Reg. (Suhderland)
- Sgt. C. R. Wood, Army Service Corps (Islington)
- Dvr. F. W. Wood, Royal Field Arty. (Hanley)
- Sgt. F. W. Wood, York & Lancaster Reg. (Conisboro)
- Cpl. H. Wood, Coldstream Guards (Befmondsey, London)
- Pte. H. Wobd, Worcestershire Reg. (Evesham)
- Sgt. H. Wood, Lancashire Fusiliers (Barnsley)
- Pte. J. Wood, East Surrey Reg. (Limehouse)
- Bombr. W. Wood, Royal Field Arty. (Uppermill, near Oldhana)
- Pte. W. A. Wood, Cheshire Reg. (Stockport)
- Pte. C. V. Woodall, Yorkshire Light Inf. (Cottingham)
- L. Cpl. A. Woodham, Military Foot Police (Salisbury)
- L. Cpl. C. W. Woods, Machine Gun Corps (Old. Woking)
- Sgt. J. Woodward, Machine Gun Corps (Dundee)
- Sgt. J. H. Woodward, Royal Warwickshire Reg. (Birmingham)
- Sgt. F. Woolfson, Royal Field Arty. (Stone)
- L. Cpl. H. Woolham, West Yorkshire Reg. (Bradford)
- Sgt. H. Wootton, Yorkshire Light Inf. (Pontefract)
- Sgt. F. J. Wormald, Army Service Corps (Bedford)
- Pte. W. S. Worthington, Lancashire Fusiliers (Eccles)
- L. Cpl. J. Wotton, King's Royal Rifle Corps (Bow, London)
- Spr. H. Woulds, Royal Engineers (Keckwich Moor, Cheshire)
- Act. Cpl. S. R. Wraight, Royal Field Arty. (Bow)
- Sgt. H. E. Wratten, Royal Engineers (Greenwich)
- Bombr. F. A. Wray, Royal Field Arty. (Kennington, London)
- Pte. A. Wright, Gloucestershire Reg. (Bristol)
- Sgt. A. I. Wright, Suffolk Reg. (Cherrihinton)
- Pte. E. Wright, Bedfordshire Reg. (Isleworth)
- Spr. F. Wright, Royal Engineers (Nottingham)
- L. Cpl. J. Wright, Royal Engineers (Warrington)
- Dvr. J. Wright, Royal Field Arty. (Greenwich)
- Pte. J. Wright, Northumberland Fusiliers (Earby, near Keighley)
- Sgt. R. Wright, Seaforth Highlanders (Westminster, London)
- Sgt. D. G. Wyatt, Rifle Brigade (Ipswich)
- L. Cpl. T. Wylie, King's Own Scottish Borderers (Paisley)
- L. Cpl. W. J. Teaman, Royal Irish Rifles (Carrowdore)
- Pte. J. Youdell, Border Reg. (West Hartlepool)
- Spr. A. D. Young, Royal Engineers (Kirrimuir)
- L. Cpl. G. J. Young, Machine Gun Corps (Shepherd's Bush)
- Pte. H. D. Young, Army Service Corps (York)
- Cpl. J. Young, Royal Field Arty. (Hendy)
- 2nd Cpl. N. A. Young, Royal Engineers (Aberdeen)
- Pte. H. Youngman, Suffolk Reg. (Marlesford)
- Cpl. W. Abbotts, Royal Field Arty. (Norwich)
- Pte. E. F. Abrahams, Duke of Cornwall's Light Inf. (Limehonse, London)
- Pte. F. Adams, Hampshire Reg. (Haggerston)
- Pte. T. Adlam, London Reg. (Peckham, London)
- Pte. T1 Adshead, Cheshire Reg. (E. Chester)
- Dvr. G. Ainsworth, Royal Field Arty. (Gorton)
- Pte. W. Alderson, Machine Gun Corps (Bishops Castle)
- Pte. T. C. Allan, Durham Light Inf. (E. Durham)
- Pte. A. Allen, Gloucestershire Reg. (Watchet)
- L. Cpl. W. Allsworth, London Reg. (Chiswick)
- L. Cpl. J. B. Ames, Cheshire Reg. (Cheltenham)
- L. Cpl. C. Amor, Royal Engineers (Mynach)
- Spr. W. Amos, Royal Engineers (Warrington)
- Gnr. E. Amy, Royal Field Arty. (St. Saviours, Jersey)
- Pte. J. Anderson, RAMC (Hirst Ashington)
- Dvr. W. F. Andrews, Royal Field Arty. (Shero borne)
- Gnr. T. Armitage, Royal Garrison Arty. (York)
- Pte. H. Armstrong, London Reg. (Dungiven)
- Gnr. J. Armstrong, Royal Field Arty. (Ryhope)
- Pte. W. Armstrong, RAMC (Northwich)
- L. Cpl. G. Arnold, London Reg. (Braintree)
- Gnr. C. Ashby, Royal Field Arty. (Hull)
- Dvr. E. W. Ashton, Royal Field Arty. (Caerphilly)
- Pte. J. Ashworth, Manchester Reg. (Bury)
- Spr. A. Atkins, Royal Engineers (Leicester)
- Pte. W. J. Auldjo, Northumberland Fusiliers (Felton)
- Pte. F. W. Ayling, London Reg. (Hove)
- L. Cpl. R. W. Aylward, Yeomanry (N. Kensington)
- L. Cpl. H. J. Back, Royal Sussex Reg. (Faversham)
- Pte. W. A. Bacon, London Reg. (Southwark Park Rd.)
- Pte. J. Baigent, Royal West Surrey Reg. (Woking)
- Pte. W. J. Bailey, RAMC (Easton)
- Pte. F. Bainbridge, South Staffordshire Reg. (Nottingham)
- Gnr. J. Baines, Royal Field Arty. (Bolton)
- Pte. J. Baird, Cameron Highlanders (Stirling)
- Gnr. H. Bakes, Royal Field Arty. (Hodthorpe)
- Pte. E. Baldwin, East Lancashire Reg. (Burnley)
- Pte. J. T. Ball, London Reg. (Reading)
- Sgt. J. H. A. Bannister, Labour Corpa (Plaistow)
- Sgt. G. E. Banting, London Reg. (Forest Gate)
- Pte. J. J. Barber, South Staffordshire Reg. (Smallthorne)
- Pte. A. E. Barker, Royal Marine Light Inf. (Sheffield)
- Pte. W. Barker, Manchester Reg. (Longsight)
- Cpl. J. A. Barlow, Machine Gun Corps (Bethnal Green, London)
- Able Seaman T. Barrett, Royal Naval Volunteer Reserve (Newcastle upon Tyne)
- Dvr. W. F. Barrett, Royal Field Arty. (Rotherhithe)
- Sgt. B. O. Barton, Yeomanry (Slymbridge)
- Pte. G. E. Barton, Royal West Kent Reg. (E. Chatham)
- Pte. E. Bastow, London Reg. (Bradford)
- Gnr. W. Baurn, Royal Garrison Arty. (Middleton-in-Teesdale)
- Pte. S. J. Bayliss, Royal Warwickshire Reg. (Birmingham)
- Cpl. C. R. Bee, London Reg. (Nottingham)
- Sgt. H. Beetham, Lancashire Fusiliers (Collingworth)
- Pte. I. Bell, Northumberland Fusiliers (Newcastle upon Tyne)
- Sgt. L. Bell, Northumberland Fusiliers (Haydon Bridge)
- Cpl. G. Bennett, Royal Garrison Arty. (Olapham)
- Spr. J. Bennett, Royal Engineers (Colyton)
- Gnr. S. W. Bennett, Royal Garrison Arty. (Oldbury)
- Sgt. G. H. Benning, Royal Field Arty. (Maidenhead)
- Pte. J. Bentley, London Reg. (Kennington)
- Sgt. S. C. Beet, London Reg. (Newington Butts)
- Gnr. W. Best, Royal Garrison Arty. (Gravesend)
- L. Cpl. C. F. Bicknell, RAMC (Tolworth, Surrey)
- Pte. G. Biddlecombe, Devonshire Reg. (Lyndhurst)
- Sgt. C. Bignell, Royal Field Arty. (London)
- L. Cpl. H. Bill, Leinster Reg. (Chapelizod)
- Sgt. S. A. Billett, Royal Field Arty. (Little Salsbury)
- Pte. H. J. Billingham, London Reg. (Dalston)
- Gnr. J. Birchall, Royal Field Arty. (Widnes)
- Gnr. W. Black, Royal Field Arty. (Belfast)
- Bombr. J. W. Blackby, Royal Field Arty. (Plumstead, London)
- Pte. L. Blake, Gloucestershire Reg. (Bemerton)
- Pte. E. Blankley, Durham Light Inf. (Loughborough)
- Pte. J. E. Board, London Reg. (Battersea Park)
- Pte. A. Bollen, London Reg. (Notting Hill)
- L. Cpl. W. M. Bolt, Devonshire Reg. (Chudleigh)
- Pte. H. E. Bond, Army Service Corps (Kingston upon Thames)
- Pte. R. W. Booth, Royal Marine Light Inf. (Heanor)
- L. Cpl. R. Bosworth, Lancashire Fusiliers (Worcester)
- Able Seaman A. Bower, Royal Naval Volunteer Reserve (Sheffield)
- Cpl. W. C. Bowler, Royal Army Veterinary Corps (Kempston)
- Act. Sgt. W. H. Boyd, Military Mounted Police (Bridgton)
- Gnr. J. Bradford, Headquarters, Royal Field Arty. (Bermondsey)
- Dvr. J. Bradley, Royal Field Arty. (Kidderminster)
- Sgt. J. J. Bradley, Royal Inniskilling Fusiliers (Glasgow)
- Sgt. E. A. Bramley, Royal Engineers (Newcastle)
- Pte. T. Bray, London Reg. (Tottenham)
- Pte. W. J. Brickwood, RAMC (Horsham)
- Pte. L. G. Briers, Lancashire Fusiliers (Kentish Town)
- Sgt. H. G. Britten, Hampshire Reg. (Salisbury)
- Sgt. C. Broad, Yorkshire Reg. (Middlesbrough)
- Pte. B. G. Brown, RAMC (Lower Edmonton)
- Dvr. E. Brown, Royal Field Arty. (Derby)
- Pte. H. Brown, Royal Welsh Fusiliers (Farnborough)
- Spr. P. Brown, Royal Engineers (Polmont)
- Dvr. R. M. Brown, Royal Field Arty. (Carlisle)
- Act. Bombr. G. Buckingham, Royal Garrison Arty. (Cowley)
- Bombr. F. Buckley, Royal Field Arty. (Manchester)
- Pte. W. Buckley, Border Reg. (Maryport)
- Pte. F. Budgett, Gloucestershire Reg. (Frome)
- Bombr. G. Burdess, Royal Field Arty. (Dandon Colliery)
- Pte. J. T. Burford, Northumberland Fusiliers (Willington Quay)
- Pte. F. Burnett, Duke of Cornwall's Light Inf. (Broadwood Widger)
- L. Cpl. T. Burnett, East Lancashire Reg. (Colne)
- Sgt. J. Burney, Machine Gun Corps (Harras Moor)
- Pnr. C. E. Burrage, Royal Engineers (Great Yarmouth)
- Sgt. W. Burrows, Royal Field Arty. (Forest Gate)
- Pte. J. Bury, East Lancashire Reg. (Darwen)
- Pte. H. H. Butcher, Royal Welsh Fusiliers (Dartford)
- Pte. J. Butcher, London Reg. (Walthamstow)
- Pte. R. Butcher, RAMC (Crawley)
- Pte. B. Cadden, Cheshire Reg. (Wallasey)
- Act. L. Cpl. W. Cambray, Royal Welsh Fusiliers (Newport, Mon.)
- Pte. J. Campbell, Machine Gun Corps (Wylam-on-Tyne)
- Dvr. B. H. Cantle, Royal Field Arty. (Lambeth)
- Dvr. A. Carmichael, Royal Field Arty. (Glenborg, N.B.)
- Pte. P. Carpenter, London Reg. (Westminster)
- Cpl. C. Carr, Northumberland Fusiliers (Whittingham)
- Pte. J. Carroll, RAMC (Old Cummock)
- Pte. J. Carter, Royal Dublin Fusiliers (E. Dublin)
- Cpl. J. G. Cavey, Cheshire Reg. (Lewes)
- Pte. A. Chadwick, Machine Gun Corps (Liddall)
- L. Cpl. A. Chalmers, Gordon Highlanders (Wiehaw)
- Act. Cpl. W. G. Chandler, Royal Field Arty. (Farncombe)
- Pte. H. A. Chapman, London Reg. (Streatham)
- L. Cpl. G. Charpey, Devonshire Reg. (Pimlico)
- Sgt. E. Christopher, Machine Gun Corps (Whitehaven)
- Spr. W. G. R. Clark, Royal Engineers (Paddington)
- Pte. A. Clarke, Rifle Brigade (Aldershot)
- Pte. A. J. Clarke, Royal Fusiliers (E. Acton)
- Pte. B. Clarke, North Staffordshire Reg. (Lichfield)
- Pte. C. V. Clarke, London Reg. (London)
- Sgt. H. S. Cliff, RAMC (Torquay)
- Pte. L. Coates, British West Indies Reg. (Jamaica)
- Able Seaman B. Cobb, Royal Naval Volunteer Reserve (Castleford)
- Able Seaman J. Cobbledick, Royal Naval Volunteer Reserve (Ashington)
- Pte. C. Cocker, Northumberland Fusiliers (Humshaugh)
- Gnr. H. S. Cockshott, Royal Garrison Arty. (Glessburn)
- Pte. E. Cohen, London Reg. (Hoxton)
- Gnr. A. E. Coleman, Royal Field Arty. (E. Swindon)
- Pte. F. Coleman, London Reg. (Liverpool)
- Pte. H. Coles, Royal Warwickshire Reg. (Birmingham)
- Pte. W. Collier, RAMC (Bolton)
- Pte. G. Collingwood, London Reg. (Highgate Rd.)
- Pte. R. C. Comley, South Staffordshire Reg. (Warmley)
- Pte. J. Connolly, East Lancashire Reg. (Newchurch-in-Rossendale)
- Spr. A. Connon, Royal Engineers (Aberdeen)
- Cpl. F. J. Cook, Royal Garrison Arty. (Hurst Batch)
- L. Cpl. J. Cook, South Staffordshire Reg. (Cranbrook)
- Gnr. S. Cooper, Royal Garrison Arty. (Nottingham)
- Sgt. E. Corkish, Royal Garrison Arty. (E. Castletown)
- Gnr. B. Coss, Royal Field Arty. (Stockport)
- Spr. W. Coutts, Royal Engineers (Comrie)
- Pte. H. Cowstdck, Royal West Surrey Reg. (Thornton. Heath)
- Spr. J. Cox, Royal Engineers (Bradley)
- Pte. T. Crank, Machine Gun Corps (Leigh)
- Pte. E. Crawshaw, Royal Lancaster Reg. (Blackburn)
- Sgt. J. E. Cree, Nottinghamshire and Derbyshire Reg. (Chesterfield)
- 2nd Cpl. F. W. Greedy, Royal Engineers (Bridgwater)
- L. Sgt. W. J. Crews, Machine Gun Corps (Okehampton)
- Bombr. W. Cribbin, Royal Field Arty. (Dublin)
- Pte. H. T. Croad, London Reg. (Westminster)
- Pte. A. S. Cross, Machine Gun Corps (Hull)
- Pte. L. Crowther, Manchester Reg. (Newton Heath)
- L. Cpl. S. Cutler, London Reg. (Southwark)
- Cpl. J. Curran, Lancashire Fusiliers (Balford)
- Tmp Bombardier, W. Curtis, Royal Marine Arty. (Chiswick)
- Act. Bombr. A. C. Daft, Royal Field Arty. (Cheltenham)
- Pte. S. T. Darch, Gloucestershire Reg. (Chessels)
- L. Cpl. E. Davies, Royal Engineers (Pontardulais)
- L. Cpl. H. C. Davies, Machine Gun Corps (Croydon)
- Pte. J. Davies, Labour Corps (Blackburn)
- Cpl. R. Davies, RAMC (Putson)
- Air Mechanic, 2nd Class F. F. Dawson, Royal Flying Corps (Metheringham)
- Act. L. Cpl. J. Dawson, North Lancashire Reg. (Bolton)
- Pte. C. G. Day, Royal West Surrey Reg. (Thorp)
- L. Cpl. J. A. Day, London Reg. (Wandsworth)
- Able Seaman F. A. O. de Boltz, Royal Naval Volunteer Reserve (Great Yarmouth)
- Sgt. J. A. Dearnley, Royal Field Arty. (Thurstonland)
- Sgt. W. G. Dedman, Royal Field Arty. (Abbeywood)
- Gnr. E. Dempsey, Royal Field Arty. (Flixton)
- Pte. C. Desmond, Devonshire Reg. (Cork)
- Pte. F. H. Dobson, Royal Marine Light Inf. (Wragly)
- Gnr. J. Dodd, Royal Garrison Arty. (Tunstall)
- Pte. F. J. Downing, Army Service Corps (Chaddesden)
- Spr. E. G. Drew, Royal Engineers (Horningloft)
- Pte. H. J. Drew, Gloucestershire Reg. (Bristol)
- Sgt. R. Driver, East Lancashire Reg. (Clitheroe)
- Sgt. G. Duckworth, Machine Gun Corps (St. Helens)
- Pte. J. Duffy, Manchester Reg. (Bury)
- Act. Bombr. T. Duffy, Royal Field Arty. (Sunderland)
- Pte. J. Duncan, Gordon Highlanders (Liverpool)
- Pte. M. B. Durham, Northumberland Fusiliers (Knottingley)
- Able Seaman J. Durie, Royal Naval Volunteer Reserve (Fetter Cairn)
- Pte. J. T. Dyer, Manchester Reg. (Holinwood)
- L. Cpl. C. Dyker, Gordon Highlanders (Enzie)
- L. Cpl. A. Edgar, Gordon Highlanders (Eastfield by Annan)
- Bombr. J. Edwards, Royal Field Arty. (Hednesford)
- L. Cpl. C. F. Elliott, Northumberland Fusiliers (Acklington)
- Pte. V. F. Ellis, Royal West Surrey Reg. (Sherley)
- Spr. W. Elsdon, Royal Engineers (Northampton)
- Act. Sgt. D. Elwell, South Staffordshire Reg. (Walsall)
- Pte. F. G. Elwyn, Northumberland Fusiliers (Norwich)
- Cpl. J. T. Emmerson, Royal Engineers (Grimsby)
- Pte. R. Emmett, London Reg. (Bermondsey)
- Dvr. R. Emms, Royal Field Arty. (Eberington)
- Pte. D. E. Evans, South Staffordshire Reg. (Treharris)
- Able Seaman S. Evans, Royal Naval Volunteer Reserve (Swansea)
- Pte. A. H. Eve, Labour Corps (Chiswick)
- Pte. J. W. Everard, London Reg. (Fulham)
- Pte. H. Farrell, London Reg. (Bermondsey)
- Pte. G. Farrimond, RAMC (St. Helens)
- Pte. F. Farrington, Border Reg. (Tyldesley)
- Cpl. A. Fell, Machine Gun Corps (Worcester Park)
- Pte. W. Fellows, South Staffordshire Reg. (Wolverhampton)
- Dvr. H. Fenton, Royal Field Arty. (Oldham)
- L. Cpl. J. Ferns, Gordon Highlanders (Campsie)
- Gnr. P. Ferris, Royal Field Arty. (Glasgow)
- Spr. G. Fetherston, Royal Engineers (Sprotborough)
- Pte. P. T. Finlay, Yeomanry (Southfields, London)
- Sgt.i. J. H. Fisher, London Reg. (Finsbury Park)
- Pte. J. H. Fisher, West Yorkshire Reg. (Rotheiham)
- Bombr. G. Fitch, Royal Field Arty. (Ilford, London)
- L. Cpl. W. H. Fitton, Lancashire Fusiliers (Oldham)
- Sgt. H. Fitzgerald, North Staffordshire Reg. (Burton-on-Trent)
- Pte. J. W. Flavell, South Staffordshire Reg. (Bilston)
- Able Seaman A. Flett, Royal Naval Volunteer Reserve (Aberdeen)
- Gnr. J. Flynn, Royal Garrison Arty. (E. Cork)
- Gnr. E. Ford, Royal Field Arty. (Mildenhall)
- Pte. A. Foster, Northumberland Fusiliers (Babblesworth)
- L. Sgt G. C. Foster, South Staffordshire Reg. (Wednesbury)
- Pte. A. Foulis, West Yorkshire Reg. (Leeds)
- Spr. F. Fowler, Royal Engineers (Hull)
- Pte. J. Francis, Royal Welsh Fusiliers (Church-Stoke)
- Sgt. J. T. French, Royal Engineers (Redruth)
- Pnr. W. Fryer, Royal Engineers (Stafford)
- L. Cpl. A. Fuller, Royal Sussex Reg. (Brede)
- Cpl. C. Gallacher, Army Service Corps (Broughty Ferry)
- Pte. P. Gallagher, Yorkshire Reg. (Swinford)
- Pte. J. Gemmell, Seaforth Highlanders (Alloa)
- Cpl. E. Gentle, Royal Garrison Arty. (Wood Green)
- Pte. G. J. Gentry, RAMC (Tooting, London)
- Cpl. T. Geraghty, RAMC (Dublin)
- Act. Sgt. C. H. Gibbins, London Reg. (Brixton)
- Dvr. V. G. Gibbins, Royal Field Arty. (Rugby)
- Dvr. R. Gibbon, Royal Field Arty. (Durham)
- Dvr. H. S. Gibbons, Royal Field Arty. (Mile End, London)
- Petty Ofc. G. Gilfillan, Royal Naval Volunteer Reserve (Port Glasgow)
- Pte. R. Gilson, London Reg. (Bermondsey)
- Sgt. G. A. Goode, Royal Engineers (Birmingham)
- Sgt. A. W. Goodman, London Reg. (Kennington)
- Bombr. F. Goodwin, Royal Field Arty. (Denton)
- Pte. G. Gordon, Gordon Highlanders, attd. Machine Gun Corps (Dufftown)
- C.Q.M.S. A. Graham, Army Service Corps (Hampstead)
- Sgt. R. Graham, East Lancashire Reg. (Blackburn)
- Bombr. J. R. Gray, Royal Field Arty. (Seaham Harbour)
- Pte. H. Green, Machine Gun Corps (London)
- L. Sgt. M. E. Green, London Reg. (Dulwich)
- Pte. N. W. Green, RAMC (Littletown, York)
- Pnr. W. T. Graenhill, Royal Engineers (Holloway)
- Pte. F. Greenwood, Border Reg. (Rochdale)
- Dvr. H. Greenwood, Royal Field Arty. (Bolton)
- Cpl. J. Greenwood, Army Service Corps (Sheffield)
- Cpl. S. Greenwood, Manchester Reg. (E. Stalybridge)
- Sgt. G. Gregson, East Lancashire Reg. (Brierfield)
- Pte. H. B. Griffiths, RAMC (Shrewsbury)
- Sgt. T. Griffiths, Machine Gun Corps (Welshpool)
- L. Cpl. R. F. Grimsey, London Reg. (Kennington)
- Able Seaman J. Grosart, Royal Naval Volunteer Reserve (Glasgow)
- Pte. A. Guest, Lancashire Fusiliers (Manchester)
- Pte. T. Guest, Royal Scots Fusiliers (Manchester)
- Spr. T. J. Gunter, Royal Engineers (Clapton)
- Pte. F. Hall, Northumberland Fusiliers (Bradford)
- Pte. W. J. Hall, London Reg. (Upton Park)
- Cpl. W. W. C. Hall, RAMC (Liverpool)
- Bombr. S. Halliday, Royal Field Arty. (Newcastle upon Tyne)
- Pte. J.Hardy, Northumberland Fusiliers (Eltringham)
- Pte. F. Harper, Manchester Reg. (Salford)
- Pte. T. Harrington, Manchester Reg. (Bradford)
- Cpl. G. C. Harris, Royal Sussex Reg. (Chichester)
- Sgt. P. Harris, Devonshire Reg. (Axminster)
- Pte. S. J. Harris, Yeomanry (Avening)
- L. Sgt. W. Harris, Lincolnshire Reg. (Lincoln)
- Cpl. W. E. Harris, London Reg. (Queens Park)
- Pte. W. H. Harris, London Reg. (Athens, U.S.A.)
- Act. Sgt. W. H. Harris, Royal Warwickshire Reg. (Aston)
- L. Sgt. J. Harrison, Cheshire Reg. (Liverpool)
- Pte. S. E. Harrison, Border Reg. (Warrington)
- Dvr. E. Hartley, Royal Field Arty. (Macclesfield)
- Pte. F. G. Harvey, Worcestershire Reg. (Worcester)
- Pte. H. Harwood, Northumberland Fusiliers (Shepherd's Bush)
- L. Cpl. H. Hawkett, Royal Sussex Reg. (Westbourne Park)
- Cpl. B. Hawkins, Royal Field Arty. (Islington, London)
- Pte. T. W. Hawkins, Army Service Corps (Corbridge-on-Tyne)
- Pte. J. Haynes, Manchester Reg. (Manchester)
- Pte. J. W. Haynes, Royal Warwickshire Reg. (St. Neots)
- Sgt. H. E. Hayward, Royal Field Arty. (Fulham)
- Sgt. F. Heath, Manchester Reg. (Greenheys)
- Pte. G. Heath, North Staffordshire Reg. (Burton-on-Trent)
- Sgt. J. H. Heath, Duke of Cornwall's Light Inf. (St. Germans)
- Pte. H. Hedger, Royal West Surrey Reg. (Shackleford)
- Bombr. N. Hemingway, Royal Garrison Arty. (Halifax)
- Spr. G. A. Henderson, Royal Engineers (Stanhope)
- Q.M.S. R. G. Herbert, Royal West Surrey Reg. (Guildford)
- Pte. J. Higgins, East Lancashire Reg. (Chadderton)
- Cpl. W. M. Hislop, London Reg. (Wallington)
- L. Cpl. W. A. Hitchcock, Devonshire Reg. (Tamerton Foliot)
- Cpl. F. W. H. Hoare, Welsh Reg. (Boror, London)
- Pte. D. Hobin, South Staffordshire Reg. (Wolverhampton)
- Pte. C. Hockley, Royal West Surrey Reg. (Hambledon)
- Able Seaman J. H. D. Hogg, Royal Naval Volunteer Reserve (South Byker)
- Pte. A. Holland, Leinster Reg. (Ludlow)
- Pte. J. S. Hollidge, Norfolk Reg. (St. Leomardson-Sea)
- Gnr. J. Hollobone, Royal Garrison Arty. (Eastbourne)
- Pte. A. H. J. Hooper, London Reg. (Poplar)
- L. Cpl. A. E. Hopton, Gloucestershire Reg. (Bristol)
- Pte. T. Horrocks, RAMC (Liverpool)
- Gnr. W. Horsfield, Royal Field Arty. (Bradford)
- L. Cpl. F. H. Houghton, Dorsetshire Reg. (Arlisey)
- Cpl. W. Houlder, Royal Field Arty. (Churwel)
- Sgt. T. How, London Reg. (Rotherhithe)
- Gnr. W. C. How, Royal Field Arty. (Willesden)
- Gnr. J. Howarth, Royal Marine Arty. (Anfield)
- Pte. E. Howe, RAMC (Richmond)
- Cpl. W. G. Hawan, Royal Garrison Arty. (Wetherby)
- Sgt. J. J. Howlett, Suffolk Reg. (Caens)
- Sgt. H. Hubbard, RAMC (West Croydon)
- Pte. A. Hudson, Cheshire Reg. (Gheadte Hulme)
- Cpl. W. G. Hudson, Gloucestershire Reg. (Bedminster)
- Gnr. G. Hughes, Royal Garrison Arty. (E. Cardiff)
- Pte. J. Hughes, Rifle Brigade (Dunchurch)
- Pte. R. Hughes, Labour Corps (Deganwy)
- Bombr. R. J. Hughes, Royal Field Arty. (Baling)
- Gnr. W. J. Hughes, Royal Field Arty. (Rhyl)
- L. Cpl. F. C. Hulbert, Border Reg. (Kensal Rise)
- Dvr. J. Hurdus, Royal Field Arty. (Oldham)
- Sgt. J. Hurley, East Lancashire Reg. (Church)
- Dvr. A. Ireland, Royal Field Arty. (St. Andrews)
- Pte. J. Isherwood, Machine Gun Corps (Black-Burn)
- Cpl. J. Jackson, Royal Engineers (Blackburn)
- Sgt. J. A. Jackson, Royal Engineers (Knuteford)
- L. Cpl. W. D. Jackson, Military Foot Police (Birmingham)
- Dvr. G. Jarvis, Royal Field Arty. (Marley)
- Pte. S. E. Jasper, Duke of Cornwall's Light Inf. (Gamelford)
- Sgt. J. Jeffrey, Royal Field Arty. (Blackburn)
- Gnr. W. J. Jessop, Royal Garrison Arty. (W. Kilburn)
- L. Cpl. O. Jobson, Army Cyclist Corps (Newburn-on-Tyne)
- Pte. A. E. Johnson, Yorkshire Reg. (Scarborough)
- Pte. P. Johnson, London Reg. (Islington)
- Pte. J. Johnson, Machine Gun Corps (Stockport)
- Cpl. S. H. Johnson, London Reg. (Margate)
- Pte. H. E. Joines, London Reg. (Banbury)
- Pte. A. L. Jones, RAMC (Ferndale)
- Gnr. R. Jones, Royal Garrison Arty. (Cardiff)
- Act. Sgt. R. Jones, Gordon Highlanders (Liverpool)
- Dvr. T. Jones, Royal Field Arty. (Orrell)
- Pte. G. Kay, East Lancashire Reg. (Blackburn)
- Pte. J. W. Kay, Manchester Reg. (Burnley)
- Spr. E. J. A. Keairns, Royal Engineers (Urmston)
- Cpl. E. Kearsley, Royal Field Arty. (Limerick)
- Pte. J. B. Kearton, Northumberland Fusiliers (Butterknowle)
- Pte. W. Kemp, Argyll and Sutherland Highlanders (Camelon)
- Cpl. C. A. Kemps, Royal Garrison Arty. (Biggieswade)
- Sgt. J. Kendall, Worcestershire Reg. (Dudley)
- L. Cpl. R. Kendrick, South Staffordshire Reg. (Walsall)
- Pte. E. S. Kenward, Royal Sussex Reg. (Polegate)
- L. Cpl. f. G. Kenwood, Duke of Cornwall's Light Inf. (Walworth)
- Pte. W. Kenyon, Manchester Reg. (Royton)
- Pte. J. Kerr, Machine Gun Corps (Kilmarnock)
- Sgt. C. F. W. Kightley DCM Royal Engineers (Highgate, London)
- Pte. A. S. Kilgour, London Reg. (Birmingham)
- Sgt. A. Kimberley, RAMC (Slough)
- Sgt. G. King, Royal Inniskilling Fusiliers (Belfast)
- Pte. W. G. King, Yorkshire Reg. (Gardham Etton)
- Sgt. W. T. King, Royal Field Arty. (Walthamstow)
- Pte. J. H. Kneale, East Lancashire Reg. (Barrow-in-Furness)
- L. Cpl. W. E. Knowles, Yeomanry (Morecambe)
- Pte. J. Laidler, Northumberland Fusiliers (Forest Hall)
- L. Cpl. J. H. Lane, Yeomanry (Hartpury)
- Pte. E. G. Laverick, London Reg. (Lambeth)
- Spr. R. Lawlor, Royal Engineers (Wallsend-on-Tyne)
- Sgt. A. E. Lawrence, Royal Field Arty. (Dalston, Carlisle)
- Spr. R. Laws, Royal Engineers (Newcastle)
- L. Cpl. F. C. Lax, Royal Engineers (Stockton-on-Tees)
- Pte. J. Ledger, King's Royal Rifle Corps (Horley)
- Pte. A. C. J. Lee, Royal West Surrey Reg. (Milton)
- Sgt. G. Lee, Royal Field Arty. (Merton, London)
- Pte. T. Lee, Duke of Cornwall's Light Inf. (Exeter)
- Pte. B. Leeman, Nottinghamshire and Derbyshire Reg. (Grimsby)
- Pte. S. Leiken, Machine Gun Corps (Portsea)
- Sgt. P. F. le Vedere, Royal Garrison Arty. (St. Aubins, Jersey)
- Pte. A. E. Leversuch, London Reg. (Deptford)
- L. Cpl. W. J. Lewis, Gloucestershire Reg. (Twickenham)
- Sgt. W. T. Lewis, Royal Field Arty. (Roath)
- Act. Cpl. W. Lilley, Royal Field Arty. (Ryhope)
- Sgt. M. Limbrick, Royal Garrison Arty. (Australia)
- Sgt. A. Livingston, Royal Field Arty. (Ballachulish)
- Sgt. P. Loctett, Manchester Reg. (Manchester)
- Gnr. J. Logan, Royal Field Arty. (Hebburn-on-Tyne)
- Pte. E. V. Long, London Reg. (Hackney)
- Spr. J. Longton, Royal Engineers (Chorley)
- Pte. W. G. Lorraine, Gloucestershire Reg. (Colchester)
- Pte. B. Lovell, Royal Sussex Reg. (Chatham)
- Pte. G. E. R. Levering, Royal West Surrey Reg. (Poplar)
- Sgt. J. R. Lowderi, Royal Garrison Arty. (Plympton)
- Sgt. G. J. Lowry, Royal Field Arty. (Streatham Hill)
- Pte. A. M. Lucas, Royal Warwickshire Reg. (Coventry)
- Sgt. E. Luke, Duke of Cornwall's Light Inf. (Wadebridge)
- Pte. W. Mackie, Machine Gun Corps (Larkhall)
- Pte. W. C. Madley, RAMC (Barnsbury, London)
- Gnr. E. Mahy, Royal Field Arty. (St. Sampsons, Guernsey)
- Cpl. F. Maidment, London Reg. (Salisbury)
- Able Seaman A. Malkin, Royal Naval Volunteer Reserve (Monkbretton)
- Sgt.f. H. Manley, Royal Garrison Arty. (E. Taunton)
- Spr. J. E. Mann, Royal Engineers (Hull)
- Pte. L. P. Mansell, South Staffordshire Reg. (Burton-on-Trent)
- Sgt. R. N. Marchant, RAMC (Sevenoaks)
- Cpl. H. Marsn, Machine Gun Corps (Edge Hill)
- Cpl. N. Marsh, Royal Field Arty. (Old Trafford)
- Pte. C. Marshall, Royal West Surrey Reg. (Farnham)
- Gnr. F. J. Marshall, Royal Garrison Arty. (Hayworthington)
- Pte. J. Martin, Royal West Surrey Reg. (Thurlow)
- Pte. C. Mason, Border Reg. (Manchester)
- Pte. J. R. Matheson, Gordon Highlanders (Ullapool)
- L. Cpl. J. Matthews, Devonshire Reg. (Witheridge)
- Pte. G. Maughan, Northumberland Fusiliers (Beamish)
- Pte. J. Maxwell, Northumberland Fusiliers (Gateshead)
- Dvr. J. May, Royal Field Arty. (Sacriston)
- Pte. J. W. May, Royal Engineers (Newcastle)
- Pte. H. McCann, RAMC (Smithone Cry, by Glasgow)
- Cpl. E. McCormick, Royal Field Arty. (Kirkdale)
- Pte. M. J. McDermott, London Reg. (Dundalk)
- Pte. R. McElroy, Border Reg. (Manchester)
- Cpl. T. McGlynn, East Lancashire Reg. (Burnley)
- Sgt. A. H. McGowan, Royal Field Arty. (Leith)
- L. Cpl. J. A. McGrath, North Staffordshire Reg. (Lancaster)
- Gnr. F. McHale, Royal Field Arty. (Bradford)
- Spr. R. McHugh, Royal Engineers (South Shields)
- Sgt. J. McManus, Manchester Reg. (Walkden)
- Pte. J. McMillan, London Reg. (Glasgow)
- Pte. P. McQuade, Royal Inniskilling Fusiliers (Paisley)
- Pte. M. Meehan, RAMC (Ferryhill)
- Pte. W. Mellor, RAMC (Oldham)
- Act. L. Cpl. W. V. Mercer, Machine Gun Corps (Garston)
- L. Sgt. J. Merrington, Essex Reg. (Sutton, Bedfordshire)
- Sgt. J. Merrins, Royal Dublin Fusiliers (Balitore, County Kildare)
- Pte. D. M. Meston, RAMC (Roslyn, Midlothian)
- Pte. W. E. Metcalfe, Northumberland Fusiliers (Birtley)
- Sgt. H. Mildenhall, Royal Field Arty. (Teddington)
- Pte. W. R. Mills, Yeomanry (Enfield)
- L. Cpl. R. Milne, Gordon Highlanders (Bridge of Marnock)
- Gnr. D. Mitchell, Royal Field Arty. (Holywell Brook)
- L. Cpl. G. W. Moat, Cheshire Reg. (Sheffield)
- Dvr. H. Monk, Royal Field Arty. (Newport, Essex.)
- L. Cpl. W. Monk, Duke of Cornwall's Light Inf. (Minehead)
- L. Cpl. J. Moore, Royal Engineers (Looe)
- Spr. W. H. Moore, Royal Engineers (Bristol)
- Able Seaman W. E. Mordue, Royal Naval Volunteer Reserve (Blyth)
- Cpl. W. H. Morgan, Yorkshire Reg. (Middlesbrough)
- Pte. J. W. Morris, Lancashire Fusiliers (Bethnal Green)
- Sgt. T. Morris, Royal Inniskilling Fusiliers (Moneymore)
- Sgt. W. Morris, Manchester Reg. (Cohgleton)
- Cpl. L. Mount, Machine Gun Corps (Barrowford)
- Sgt. J. Mountain, Lincolnshire Reg. (Grimsby)
- Cpl. W. Mountain, Royal Engineers (Sheffield)
- Spr. J. Mullaney, Royal Engineers (Sligo)
- Pte. J. B. Murdoch, Gordon Highlanders (Edinburgh)
- L. Cpl. H. Nadin, Cheshire Reg. (Chesterfield)
- Act. Lance Sergeant A. Nash, Gordon Highlanders (Altrincham)
- Pte. H. W. Nash, Royal Marine Light Inf. (High Wycombe)
- Pte. L. C. Newbury, North Staffordshire Reg. (Burtonn-Trent)
- Spr. J. Newton, Royal Engineers (E. Lichfield)
- Sgt. J. R. Newton, Lancashire Fusiliers (Bishop Auckland)
- Pte. J. Nichols, London Reg. (Woolwich)
- Cpl. R. Noonan, Royal Warwickshire Reg. (Wigan)
- Dvr. A. W. Norton, Royal Field Arty. (Walthamstow)
- Sgt. W. A. Nowers, RAMC (Canterbury)
- Pte. J. Olver, London Reg. (Forest Gate)
- Pte. F. O'Sullivan, Lancashire Fusiliers (Newport)
- Sgt. S. E. Oxborrow, Machine Gun Corps (Shirley)
- Pte. F. J. N. Page, London Reg. (Kingston)
- Gnr. W. Page, Royal Field Arty. (Pentonville)
- Sgt. A. E. Palmer, Yorkshire Reg. (Peckharn)
- Bombr. W. J. Palmer, Royal Garrison Arty. (Dover)
- Cpl. T. Parish, London Reg. (Chelsea)
- Sgt. W. Parkes, Royal Field Arty. (West Hartlepool)
- Able Seaman G. Parkinson, Royal Naval Volunteer Reserve (Ryton-on-Tyne)
- L. Cpl. N. Parkinson, Machine Gun Corps (Wilsey)
- Pte. A. L. Parry, Labour Corps (Bethesda)
- L. Sgt. E. E. Parry, RAMC (Chorlton-on-Medlock)
- L. Cpl. F. Parsons, Royal Welsh Fusiliers (Oldham)
- Pte. R.Patterson, Northumberland Fusiliers (Lesbury)
- Sgt. H. Payne, Royal Field Arty. (Plymstock)
- Pte. M. Payne, Manchester Reg. (Oldham)
- Gnr. H. Peacock, Royal Field Arty. (Hebburn-on-Tyne)
- Pte. J. H. Peacock, Border Reg. (Darlington)
- Bombr. G. E. A. Peake, Royal Garrison Arty. (Peterborough)
- Dvr. A. Pearce, Royal Field Arty. (Nettlestead)
- Pte. C. K. Pearman, Northumberland Fusiliers (Cambridge)
- Pnr. J. Pearson, Royal Engineers (Grimsby)
- Pte. T. Pencott, Northumberland Fusiliers (Hexham-on-Tyne)
- Gnr. J. Pennington, Royal Field Arty. (Eastbourne)
- L. Sgt. W. H. Penrose, Duke of Cornwall's Light Inf. (Lamorna)
- Act. Bombr. C. Perrett, Royal Field Arty. (E. Deptford)
- L. Cpl. G. Peskett, Royal West Kent Reg. (Greenwich)
- Gnr. F. G. Phelps, Royal Field Arty. (Box)
- Sgt. H. Phipps, Gloucestershire Reg. (Little Compton)
- Sgt. W. J. Pidgeon, Gloucestershire Reg. (Torquay)
- Pte. D. Pilgrim, Machine Gun Corps (Sudbury)
- Pte. C. J. Piper, Royal Fusiliers Bampstead)
- L. Cpl. H. G. Pitcher, Royal Fusiliers (Hanwell)
- Cpl. S. H. Platel, Royal Flying Corps (Brixton Hill)
- Pte. R. Plumridge, RAMC (High Wycombe)
- L. Cpl. S. F. Plush, Royal Engineers (S. Bermondsey)
- Gnr. T. Pomfret, Royal Garrison Arty. (Lower Darwin)
- Pte. G. R. Pooley, Yeomanry (Stoke Newington)
- Petty Ofc. A. D. Porter, Royal Naval Volunteer Reserve (Limehouse)
- L. Cpl. E. A. Porter, London Reg. (Southwark)
- Cpl. R. Pugh, Royal Welsh Fusiliers (Tylorstown)
- Pte. T. S. Purcell, RAMC (New York)
- Gnr. J. W. Raine, Royal Field Arty. (Hebburn)
- Cpl. A. Randall, North Staffordshire Reg. (Walsall)
- Pte. S. Redford, London Reg. (Highgate)
- L. Cpl. E. H. Redhead, London Reg. (Ilfoid)
- Sgt. G. Redhead, Royal Engineers (Leamington)
- Spr. G. Reece, Royal Engineers (Rainham)
- Pte. G. W. Reed, Manchester Reg. (Chorlton-cum-Hardy)
- Pnr. G. W. Rees, Royal Engineers (Grimsby)
- Sgt. A. W. Reid, Royal Garrison Arty. (Old Kent Road, London)
- Pte. A. Rhodes, Cheshire Reg. (Stockport)
- Pte. C. Ribbits, Northumberland Fusiliers (Ratcliff)
- Gnr. A. W. Richardson, Royal Garrison Arty. (Haswell, Oxford)
- Pte. E. G. Richardson, London Reg. (Forest Gate)
- Dvr. J. Richardson, Royal Field Arty. (Church)
- Sgt. R. Ridpeath, Northumberland Fusiliers (Beal)
- Sgt. L. J. Rivett, Royal Field Arty. (Stratford)
- Pte. C. W. Roake, London Reg. (West Newington)
- Spr. G. W. Roberts, Royal Engineers (Eastbourne)
- Leading Seaman W. Roberts, Royal Naval Volunteer Reserve (Larbert)
- L. Cpl. T. Robertson, Royal Scots Fusiliers (Ayr)
- Pte. L. A. Robeson, London Reg. (Anerley)
- L. Cpl. J. Robinson, Royal Engineers (Manchester)
- Sgt. R. Roche, Leinster Reg. (Drogheda)
- Pte. F. Rogers, Northumberland Fusiliers (Sheffield)
- L. Cpl. F. A. Rogers, Gloucestershire Reg. (Pice)
- L. Cpl. W. Rooney, Liverpool Reg. (Liverpool)
- Bombr. S. Roper, Royal Field Arty. (Balham, London)
- Pte. G. C. Ross, London Reg. (Poplar)
- Sgt. W. R. Rowe, Machine Gun Corps (Devonport)
- Cpl. F. W. Rowland, Labour Corps (East Ham)
- Dvr. W. Rowlands, Royal Field Arty. (Conway)
- Sgt. S. Rudd, Northumberland Fusiliers (Blythe)
- Sgt. L. F. Rudlington, North Staffordshire Reg. (Burton-on-Ttent)
- Pte. H. E. Rushton, RAMC (Ashbourne)
- Pte. E. Russell, South Staffordshire Reg. (Darlaston)
- Pte. F. Russell, London Reg. (St. James's)
- Pte. A. Ryder, Machine Gun Corps (Preston)
- Spr. M. O. Ryan, Royal Engineers (Limerick)
- Pte. T. Salt, Royal Marine Light Inf. (Newcaatle-under-Lyme)
- Pte. H. J. Sanders, RAMC (Kettering)
- Pte. G. Sawyers, Royal West Surrey Reg. (Caterham Valley)
- Gnr. A. Sayers, Royal Garrison Arty. (Glasgow)
- Sgt. C. S. Scott, Royal Field Arty. (Rowlands)
- Gnr. D. Scott, Royal Field Arty. (Glenisla)
- L. Cpl. H. W. Scott, London Reg. (Walthamstow)
- Pte. W. Scott, RAMC (Selkirk)
- Spr. W. G. Scott, Royal Engineers (Exeter)
- Pte. F. C. Scrivener, Middlesex Reg. (Hatfield Peverel)
- Pte. W. F. Seals, Northumberland Fusiliers (Berwick)
- Cpl. C. Sears, Labour Corps (Teddington)
- L. Cpl. S. J. Sears, Royal West Kent Reg. (Wrotham Heath)
- Pte. W. Shannon, RAMC (Derby)
- Pte. A. Sharpe, North Staffordshire Reg. (Burton-on-Trent)
- Pte. G. S. Sharp, North Lancashire Reg. (Wigan)
- Spr. W. D. Sharp, Royal Engineers (Melrose)
- Spr. E. Sheffield, Royal Engineers (Peterborough)
- L. Cpl. G. H. Shepherd, Northumberland Fusiliers (Kirby-in-Ashfield)
- Pte. W. Sheppard, Royal Welsh Fusiliers (Penarth)
- Sgt. A. V. Sheringham, Royal Garrison Arty. (London)
- Act. Sgt. B. Shires, Yorkshire Reg. (West Hartlepodl)
- Able Seaman F. Shilan, Royal Naval Volunteer Reserve (Ashington)
- Sgt. W. L. Shortridge, Royal Engineers (Bidworth)
- Spr. E. Simmons, Royal Engineers (Blythe)
- Petty Ofc. J. Simpson, Royal Naval Volunteer Reserve (Newcastle upon Tyne)
- Pte. F. Sims, RAMC (E. Huddersfield)
- Pte. W. M. Sinclair, Durham Light Inf. (Consett)
- Sgt. R. E. Skinner, Royal Sussex Reg. (Hove)
- Sgt. W. Skinner, Royal Horse Arty. (Inverness)
- Pte. W. A. Skitter, London Reg. (Tottenham)
- Spr. C. Smart, Royal Engineers (Dulwich)
- Cpl. A. P. Smith, London Reg. (Motherwell)
- Pte. C. Smith, Manchester Reg. (Stockport)
- Gnr. C. L. Smith, Royal Field Arty. (Gatley)
- Sgt. F. Smith, Royal West Surrey Reg. (Rye)
- Spr. G. R. Smith, Royal Engineers (Sutton-on-Sea)
- Pte. H. Smith, Manchester Reg. (Salford)
- Spr. H. Smith, Royal Engineers (Walsall)
- Pte. J. Smith, West Riding Reg., attd. Machine Gun Company (E. York)
- Pte. R. J. Smith, London Reg. (Fulham)
- Dvr. T. Smith, Royal Field Arty. (Exeter)
- Cpl. W. C. Smith, Northumberland Fusiliers (Wall-on-Tyne)
- Pte. R. Snape, Royal Welsh Fusiliers (Birkenhead)
- Pte. F. Soden, Machine Gun Corps (Warwick)
- Pte. H. Spence, RAMC (Oldham)
- Dvr. R. Spence, Royal Field Arty. (Letham)
- 2nd Cpl. T. A. Spires, Royal Engineers (Newcastle)
- Pte. H. C. Stables, RAMC (Halifax)
- Gnr. H. O. Stacey, Royal Garrison Arty. (Box)
- Pte. T. Stafford, RAMC (Newcastle upon Tyne)
- Spr. W. Stanley, Royal Engineers (Manchester)
- Cpl. F. Staples, Royal Garrison Arty. (Crewkerne)
- L. Sgt. H. Stedman, Lancashire Fusiliers (Burslem)
- Pte. J. T. Steel, Northumberland Fusiliers (Alwick)
- Pnr. R. Stephenson, Royal Engineers (Hull)
- Cpl. F. J. Stevens, RAMC (Margate)
- Pte. H. T. Stevens, East Surrey Reg. (E. Watford)
- Dvr. H. Stevenson, Royal Field Arty. (Kilmaurs)
- Dvr. Sergeant W. Stevenson, Scots Guards (Pimlico, London)
- Gnr. J. Stoddart, Royal Garrison Arty. (E. Errogie)
- Bombr. J. Stokoe, Royal Field Arty. (Hetton-le-Hole)
- Gnr. C. E. Stone, Royal Field Arty. (Sutton-in-Ashfield)
- Sgt. A. Story, Royal Field Arty. (Heaton)
- Pte. J. A. Stott, Yeomanry (Slough)
- Gnr. A. J. Stow, Royal Field Arty. (Upper Edmonton)
- Pte. L. H. Stratton, Essex Reg. (Ecchinswell)
- Pte. J. Stuart, Gordon Highlanders (Glasgow)
- Pte. W. J. Sturdy, Liverpool Reg. (Liverpool)
- Cpl. A. G. Swan, Royal Engineers (Northampton)
- L. Cpl. R. Swann, Royal Engineers (Finsbury)
- Dvr. W. Sweeney, Royal Field Arty. (Newport, Hon)
- Bombr. A. Swinnerton, Royal Garrison Arty. (Stepney)
- Dvr. C. Sullivan, Royal Field Arty. (Bexley Heath)
- Pte. W. E. J. Sully, Royal Marine Light Inf. (Nailsbourne)
- Pte. T. Taaffe, RAMC (Louth, County Lough)
- Pte. S. Taft, Northumberland Fusiliers (Mansfield)
- Pte. A. A. Tarr, Northumberland Fusiliers (Sheffield)
- Cpl. F. A. Taylor, Royal Field Arty. (Gravesend)
- Gnr. F. F. Taylor, Royal Garrison Arty. (Higginshaw)
- Act. Sgt. J. Taylor, Royal Inniskilling Fusiliers (Pembroke)
- Cpl. R. Taylor, Royal Welsh Fusiliers (Bangor)
- Cpl. T. E. Taylor, Royal Engineers (Manchester)
- Pte. J. Tearce, RAMC (Newcastle)
- Pte. J. Telford, Machine Gun Corps (Durham)
- Pte. J. H. Terry, Nottinghamshire and Derbyshire Reg. (Nottingham)
- Sgt. F. Tetiow, Lancashire Fusiliers (Oldham)
- Pte. E. Thomas, Lancashire Fusiliers (Chester)
- Gnr. M. Tierney, Royal Garrison Arty. (Ennis)
- Cpl. W. B. Tiflen, Northumberland Fusiliers (Stocksfield-on-Tyne)
- Gnr. A. E. Tilley, Royal Garrison Arty. (Peterboro)
- Pte. W. Tilley, Machine Gun Corps (Great Bridge)
- Pte. W. Timson, South Staffordshire Reg. (Leicester)
- Pte. E. Titchener, Manchester Reg. (Lambeth, London)
- Pte. J. W. Todd, Northumberland Fusiliers (Darlington)
- Cpl. J. H. Topliss, Cheshire Reg. (Grimsby)
- Pnr. T. C. Towers, Royal Engineers (Orkney)
- L. Cpl. A. Tribe, Royal Engineers (E. Chatham)
- Spr. W. Trodd, Royal Engineers (Wandsworth)
- Dvr. H. E. Tucker, Royal Field Arty. (Sittingbourne)
- L. Sgt. E. H. Tumner, London Reg. (Maiden)
- Sgt. C. H. D. P. Turnbar, Royal Garrison Arty. (Southall)
- Pte. A. J. Turton, Devonshire Reg. (Canning Town)
- Sgt. A. J. Tyler, London Reg. (Tottenham)
- Pte. C. H. Vick, London Reg. (Mortlake)
- L. Sgt. J. Vigor, Royal Sussex Reg. (Burwash)
- Pte. W. L. Vivian, Duke of Cornwall's Light Inf. (Perranwell)
- Sgt. N. G. Wakeham, Duke of Cornwall's Light Inf. (Praze)
- Cpl. G. Waldron, Labour Corps (Cardiff)
- Cpl. H. W. Waldron, Lancashire Fusiliers (Droitwich)
- Sgt. E. Walker, Cheshire Reg. (Liverpool)
- L. Cpl. G. Walker, Manchester Reg. (Miles-Platting)
- Cpl. S. Walker, Cheshire Reg. (Hunslet)
- Gnr. W. L. Walker, Royal Field Arty. (Friockheim, N.B.)
- Act. Cpl. T. Walsh, South Staffordshire Reg. (Wolverhampton)
- Pte. A. Walton, Durham Light Inf. (Consett)
- L. Cpl. G. Walton, London Reg. (Shepherd's Bush)
- Gnr. J. W. Walton, Royal Garrison Arty. (Newcastle upon Tyne)
- Act. Lance Sergeant J. W. Walton, Northumberland Fusiliers (Bishop Auckland)
- Pte. W. Waring, Royal Welsh Fusiliers (Welshpool)
- Gnr. J. Waterhouse, Royal Field Arty. (Accrington)
- Bombr. E. C. Waters, Royal Field Arty. (Stratford, London)
- Pte. W. Watkinson, London Reg. (Portsmouth)
- Pte. G. D. Watson, Northumberland Fusiliers (Chopwell)
- Pte. W. H. Watson, London Reg. (Hackney)
- Spr. W. Waugh, Royal Engineers (Reading)
- Sgt. A. A. Weaver, RAMC (Kew Gardens)
- Cpl. H. R. Webb, East Kent Reg. (Chatham)
- Pte. T. Weisberg, London Reg. (Hackney)
- Gnr. G. C. Welsford, Royal Garrison Arty. (Stonehouse)
- Cpl. F. T. West, Yeomanry (Bedford)
- L. Cpl. H. D. Westgarth, Northumberland Fusiliers (Newcastle)
- Able Seaman W. Westlake, Royal Naval Volunteer Reserve (Cardiff)
- Gnr. H. W. White, Royal Field Arty. (Leyton)
- Pte. L. Wigham, Northumberland Fusiliers (York)
- Gnr. W. Wilberforce, Royal Field Arty. (Withernsea)
- Spr. G. Willey, Royal Engineers (Exeter)
- Dvr. J. William, Royal Field Arty. (Warwick)
- Pte. A. A. J. Williams, London Reg. (Peckham, London)
- Pte. F. F. Williams, Royal West Kent Reg. (Wandsworth, London)
- Able Seaman J. C. Williams, Royal Naval Volunteer Reserve (Swansea)
- Pte. O. C. Williams, Lancashire Fusiliers (Manchester)
- Cpl. H. Willis, Northumberland Fusiliers (West Wylam)
- Pte. G. Wilmot, RAMC (Cullompton)
- Cpl. G. H. Wilmott, Royal Engineers (Witney)
- Pte. W. Willmott, Northumberland Fusiliers (Northampton)
- Pte. H. T. Wills, Northumberland Fusiliers (Peckham)
- Pte. A. W. Wilson, Northumberland Fusiliers (Littleport)
- Dvr. G. Wilson, Royal Field Arty. (Urmston)
- Pte. J. A. Wilson, Machine Gun Corps (Consett)
- Spr. T. J. Wilson, Royal Engineers (Tunstall)
- Gnr. W. Winkley, Royal Field Arty. (Clitheroe)
- Pte. W. G. H. Winsor, London Reg. (Ladbroke Grove, London)
- Pte. N. G. Witchell, Yeomanry (Horsley, near Nailsworth)
- Sgt. J. Withinsnaw, Royal Field Arty. (New Seaham)
- L. Cpl. W. Wood, Gordon Highlanders (Inverune)
- Sgt. H. Woodbourne, Border Reg. (Manchester)
- Pte. T. Woods, Lancashire Fusiliers (Preston)
- Dvr. F. Woodward, Royal Field Arty. (Nottingham)
- Pte. H. Woodward, South Staffordshire Reg. (Bulwell)
- Act. Sgt. W. H. Worral, South Staffordshire Reg. (Birmingham)
- Pte. G. A. Wratten, Royal Sussex Reg. (Horeham Road)
- Sgt. D. E. R. Wright, Northumberland Fusiliers (Newcastle)
- L. Cpl. J. Wright, Royal Engineers (E. Chatham)
- L. Cpl. W. R. Wright, Royal Engineers (Blackpool)
- L. Cpl. J. Wych, Manchester Reg. (Hyde)
- Pte. F. A. Wyllyams, RAMC (Bristol)
- Pte.F. T. Yateo, Bedfordshire Reg. (Bletchly)
- Pte. W. Yates, North Staffordshire Reg. (Burton-on-Trent)
- Pte. T. Yeubrey, Manchester Reg. (Wolverhampton)
- Pte. R. Abbott, Lancashire Fusiliers (Pendleton)
- Pte. A. E. Adams, South Wales Borderers (Severn)
- Pte. F. Adams, Nottinghamshire and Derbyshire Reg. (Dover)
- Pte. F. Adams, South Wales Borderers (Worcester)
- Pte. J. T. Addison, Coldstream Guards (Billisdon)
- Pte. D. Aitken, Royal Warwickshire Reg. (St. Ninian, Stirling)
- Pte. F. C. Alder, RAMC (Birmingham)
- Sgt. T. Aldridge, Lancashire Fusiliers (Salford)
- Cpl. F. W, Alesworth, Machine Gun Corps (Hastings)
- Act. Sgt. S. J. Alexander, Liverpool Reg. (Liverpool)
- Pte. H. S. Alford, Coldstream Guards (Coytrahene, near Bridgend)
- L. Cpl. J. E. Alker, Lancashire Fusiliers (Holland Moor)
- Able Seaman H. S. Allan, Royal Naval Volunteer Reserve (Glasgow)
- Sgt. C. H. Allen, Royal Field Arty. (Chatham)
- Pte. C. L. Allen, Liverpool Reg. (Liverpool)
- Pte. R. Allen, Lancashire Fusiliers (Widnes)
- Pte. C. Alline, South Wales Borderers (Barry Dock)
- Pte. R. S. Anderson, Liverpool Reg. (Liverpool)
- Pte. T. Anderson, Royal Scots (Glasgow)
- Pte. D. Andrews, Hampshire Reg. (Winchfield)
- Bombr. T. E. Andrews, Royal Field Arty. (Deptford)
- Pte. W. Arkell, Royal Warwickshire Reg. (Bampton)
- Pte. A. J. Arnold, Rifle Brigade (Walden)
- Pte. A. Ashworth, Coldstream Guards (Brood Meadow Farm, Lancaster)
- Pte. A. E. Ashburn, Royal Lancaster Reg. (Barrow-in-Furness)
- Pte. G. Ashworth, North Lancashire Reg. (Wigan)
- Pte. J. Ashton, Rifle Brigade (Preston)
- Sgt. W. Ashcroft, North Lancashire Reg. (Bolton)
- Sgt. J. Atkinson, Coldstream Guards (West Benwell-on-Tyne)
- Cpl. J. T. Atkinson, Gloucestershire Reg. (Newent)
- Pte. C. S. Auld, RAMC (Mersat)
- Pte. T. D. Austin, Yorkshire Light Inf. (Sheffield)
- Spr. A. L. Ayres, Royal Engineers (Launceston)
- Pte. H. Bailey, Worcestershire Reg. (Walsall)
- L. Cpl. J. E. Bailey, Lancashire Fusiliers (Bury)
- Pte. W. K. Bailey, Worcestershire Reg. (Melton Mowbray)
- Cpl. R. G. Baillie, Scots Guards (Aberdeen)
- Pte. J. Baines, Nottinghamshire and Derbyshire Reg. (Smethwick)
- Sgt. E. Ball, Lancashire Fusiliers (Heywood)
- Pte. G. Ball, Lancashire Fusiliers (Hindley)
- Sgt. T. Ball, Liverpool Reg. (Liverpool)
- Pte. G. Banks, Liverpool Reg. (Manchester)
- L. Cpl. T. Banks, Lancashire Fusiliers (Aspull)
- Pte. J. Bann, Scots Guards (Winchburgh)
- L. Cpl. F. W. Banner, Lancashire Fusiliers (Warrington)
- Pte. F. Barber, Machine Gun Corps (Rochdale)
- Sgt. D. Barker, Cheshire Reg. (Nantwich)
- Pte. L. Barker, Manchester Reg. (Dukinfield)
- Pte. A. J. Barlow, Welsh Guards (Kingsdown)
- Pte. W. Barlow, Manchester Reg. (Liverpool)
- Pte. S. Barnes, Manchester Reg. (Oldham)
- Gnr. C. H. Barr, Royal Field Arty. (Barnet)
- Pte. E. G. Barr, Rifle Brigade (Kentish Town)
- Pte. L. Barrett, London Reg. (Luton)
- Pte. G. Barron, RAMC (Thatto Heath)
- L. Sgt. B. Barrow, Royal Lancaster Reg. (Greenodd)
- Pte. J. Barry, Manchester Reg. (Merthyr Tydvil)
- Pte. H. H. Bartle, Lincolnshire Reg. (Stafford)
- Pte. B. Batchelor, Manchester Reg. (Rochester)
- Sgt. C. Bateman, Essex Reg. (Riseley)
- Pte. W. Bath, Hampshire Reg. (Southampton)
- Pte. P. G. Bavin, Essex Reg. (Bishops Stortford)
- Pte. G. Baxter, Nottinghamshire and Derbyshire Reg. (Growle)
- Sgt. G. Baxter, Royal Scots Fusiliers (Glasgow)
- Pte. H. Baxter, Lancashire Fusiliers (Great Harwood)
- Pte. A. Bayles, Yorkshire Light Inf. (Barton)
- Cpl. Fitter A. M. Bayley, Royal Field Arty. (Ipswich)
- Pte. R. A. Bayliss, Hertfordshire Reg. (Bavendon)
- Pte. W. Bayles, Durham Light Inf. (South Shields)
- Cpl. A. N. Beard, Lancashire Fusiliers (Lower Kensal)
- Pte. F. Beasley, RAMC (Birmingham)
- Pte. E. Beckett, South Lancashire Reg. (Manchester)
- Cpl. J. W. Beckham, Manchester Reg. (Arnfield Plain)
- Pte. G. Beckett, Nottinghamshire and Derbyshire Reg. (Burslem)
- Sgt. H. Bell, North Lancashire Reg. (Preston)
- L. Cpl. H. G. Bell, King's Royal Rifle Corps (Romford)
- Pte. J. Bell, Nottinghamshire and Derbyshire Reg. (Mansfield)
- L. Cpl. J. Bell, Yorkshire Light Inf. (Durham)
- Cpl. W. Bell, Essex Reg. (Southend)
- Pte. T. Bellerby, East Yorkshire Reg. (Otley)
- Pte. R. O. Bendall, Coldstream Guards (Wells)
- Gnr. W. Bennett, Royal Field Arty. (Cardiff)
- Pte. E. Bentley, Lancashire Fusiliers (Darwen)
- Pte. G. Bentley, Worcestershire Reg. (Old Hill)
- L. Cpl. W. Bentley, South Wales Borderers (Birmingham)
- Pte. E. Berry, South Lancashire Reg. (St. Helens)
- Pte. A. Bethell, East Kent Reg. (West Norwood, London)
- Pte. B. Binks, Border Reg. (Ipswich)
- Pte. J. H. Binedell, RAMC (Cape Town)
- Pte. G. E. Binns, Royal Fusiliers (Harringay)
- Pte. G. Birchall, King's Own Scottish Borderers (Marton)
- Pte. G. E. Birchett, East Kent Reg. (Lympne)
- L. Cpl. W. C. Bird, Devonshire Reg. (Goodwood)
- Gnr. A. C. Bish, Royal Garrison Arty. (Worthing)
- Pte. W. M. Bishop, RAMC (Liverpool)
- Pte. R. Black, Manchester Reg. (Great Ashfield)
- Sgt. T. Blair, South Wales Borderers (Leamington)
- Pte. H. J. Blake, Royal Warwickshire Reg. (Andover)
- Pte. R. F. Blankley, Royal Fusiliers (Brierley Hill)
- Sgt. T. Blomeley, Lancashire Fusiliers (Manchester)
- Pte. R. Blyth, RAMC (Dundee)
- Sgt. S. Boardman, Manchester Reg. (Oldham)
- Pte. W. Boarer, East Kent Reg. (Withyham)
- L. Cpl. W. H. Boast, Machine Gun Corps (Peckham)
- L. Cpl. H. Bolden, East Kent Reg. (Islington)
- L. Cpl. R. Bolton, Yorkshire Light Inf. (Mindrum)
- L. Cpl. G. H. J. Bond, Machine Gun Corps (Bath)
- Pte. A. Booth, Lancashire Fusiliers (Elton)
- Sgt. J. T. Booth, Durham Light Inf. (Wardley)
- Pte. A. Bostock, Lancashire Fusiliers (Smithy Bridge)
- Sgt. H. Botting, Machine Gun Guards (Tunbridge)
- Sgt. C. Bouch, Yorkshire Light Inf. (Walden)
- Pte. R. A. Bouckley, RAMC (Birmingham)
- Sgt. E. R. Bourne, Machine Gun Corps (New Brompton)
- Pte. W. Bower, Nottinghamshire and Derbyshire Reg. (Sutton-in-Ashfield)
- Pte. E. L. Boyd, Lancashire Fusiliers (Newcastle upon Tyne)
- L. Cpl. W. Boyd, Liverpool Reg. (Llandigai)
- Pte. R. Boyton, Irish Guards (Boyle)
- Pte. J. Bracegirdle, Lancashire Fusiliers (Ancoats)
- Pte. T. Bramhill, Lancashire Fusiliers (Ince)
- Cpl. J. Bradshaw, North Lancashire Reg. (Hindley)
- Pte. E. Bray, Hampshire Reg. (Southsea)
- Pte. H. Brazier, Hampshire Reg. (Micheldever)
- L. Cpl. H. H. Briant, Machine Gun Corps (Hurstbourne)
- Pte. C. E. Brierley, Manchester Reg. (Rusholme)
- Pte. A. Brighton, Worcestershire Reg. (Kidderminster)
- Cpl. W. Brett, Lancashire Fusiliers (Radcliffe)
- Pte. D. Broatch, Lancashire Fusiliers (Longtown)
- 2nd Cpl. C. Brookes, Royal Engineers (New Barnet)
- Pte. C. G. Brookes, Lancashire Fusiliers (Manchester)
- Sgt. J. Brooks, Royal Dublin Fusiliers (Carlow)
- Gnr. A. Brown, Royal Field Arty. (Hucknall)
- Sgt. E. Brown, Royal Irish Fusiliers (Downpatrick)
- Dvr. E. F. Brown, Royal Field Arty. (Ipswich)
- Pte. G. H. Brown, South Lancashire Reg. (Ebenezer, Cam.)
- L. Cpl. J. Brown, King's Royal Rifle Corps (Watford)
- Sgt. J. Brown, King's Own Scottish Borderers (Edinburgh)
- Pte. P. Brown, Hampshire Reg. (Brighton)
- Cpl. M. Browne, Irish Guards (Ballinamore)
- Pte. W. Brown, East Yorkshire Reg. (Ferniegair)
- Pte. W. Brownlie, Scottish Rifles (Burnbank)
- Pte. E. Brownwood, RAMC (Burnley)
- Pte. J. A. Buck, Middlesex Reg., attd. Machine Gun Company (Baling)
- Pte. W. Bunyan, Bedfordshire Reg. (Leighton Buzzard)
- Sgt. W. J. Bunyan, Royal Field Arty. (Tooting, London)
- Sgt. W. Burchell, Royal Field Arty. (South Tottenham)
- Pte. F. E. Burgess, Durh. Lr. (Worcester)
- Gnr. H. Burgess, Royal Field Arty. (Northwich)
- Pte. H. Burgess, Manchester Reg. (Oldham)
- Cpl. P. M. Burke, East Lancashire Reg. (Idle)
- Pte. G. E. Burks, Royal Fusiliers (South Kelsey)
- Pte. G. A. Burnage, RAMC (Stanley)
- Cpl. J. Burns, Royal Garrison Arty. (Wigan)
- Pte. J. T. Burns, North Lancashire Reg. (Preston)
- Pte. A. G. Bushell, Middlesex Reg. (St. Lukes, London)
- Pte. W. H. Bustin, Nottinghamshire and Derbyshire Reg. (Leicester)
- Pte. W. J. Butcher, Royal Fusiliers (Battersea)
- L. Cpl. E. C. Butler, Yeomanry (New Maiden)
- Pte. T. Butler, Royal Dublin Fusiliers (Fethard)
- Pte. C. H. Buzzard, Lancashire Fusiliers (Flucknall)
- Pte. R. Cairnie, Royal Highlanders (Dundee)
- Pte. L. Cairns, Lancashire Fusiliers (Burnley)
- Pte. W. Cairns, Royal Scots (Fauldliouse)
- Pte. H. F. Cake, Hampshire Reg. (Middle Southampton)
- L. Cpl. W. D. Caldbeck, Liverpool Reg. (Liverpool)
- L. Cpl. S. A Callaway, RAMC (Slough)
- Pte. W, Cameron, North Staffordshire Reg. (Dunblane)
- Cpl. D. Campbell, Royal Scots (Dalmellington)
- L. Cpl. H. Campbell, Machine Gun Corps (Dundee)
- Pte. E. Cannon, Manchester Reg. (Cork)
- Gnr. G. P. Carlton, A. Battery, Royal Field Arty. (St. Hunslett)
- Pte. L. Carney, East Lancashire Reg. (Middlesbrough)
- L. Cpl. G. W. Carpenter, Worcestershire Reg. (Steeple Aston)
- Pte. S. Carr, York & Lancaster Reg. (Sheffield)
- Sgt. P. C. Carter, Coldstream Guards (Reading)
- L. Cpl. J. Carter, Durham Light Inf. (Quebec, County Durham)
- Pte. P. J. Carter, Scots Guards (Brockley, London)
- Pte. W. Carter, Machine Gun Corps (Preston)
- Pte. W. Cartwright, North Lancashire Reg. (Bolton)
- Gnr. G. H. Caterall, Royal Field Arty. (Great Harwood)
- L. Cpl. T. Cayton, North Lancashire Reg. (Newton-le-Willows)
- Pte. E. Chadderton, Liverpool Reg. (Oldham)
- Cpl. A. Chadwick, East Lancashire Reg. (Darwin)
- Cpl. J. Chadwick, Lancashire Fusiliers (Hulme)
- Gnr. F. R. Chalk, Royal Field Arty. (Itchen Abbott)
- Pte. H. W. Chalkley, Hertfordshire Reg. (Hitchin)
- Pte. D. Challenor, RAMC (Achddw)
- L. Sgt. J. Chantry, Manchester Reg. (Hindley Green)
- Cpl. S. Chapman, Liverpool Reg. (Orrell)
- Cpl. A. J. Charsley, Machine Gun Corps (Birmingham)
- L. Cpl. H. C. Charters, Royal Fusiliers (Kingsland, London)
- Pte. J. E. Chatburn, Lancashire Fusiliers (Ellesmere)
- L. Cpl. T. Chester, Royal Lancaster Reg. (Askham-in-Furness)
- Sgt. H. L. Cheston, Gloucestershire Reg. (Taunton)
- L. Cpl. J. D. Cheyne, South Wales Borderers (Newport, Mon.)
- Pte. A.J. Chidgey, King's Own Scottish Borderers (Bristol)
- Pte. F. Child, Liverpool Reg. (Winewall)
- Pte. S. H. Childs, Liverpool Reg. (Coten)
- L. Cpl. E. Chillman, King's Royal Rifle Corps (London)
- Pte. T. D. Clancy, Welsh Guards (Barry)
- Pte. G. Clark, Hampshire Reg. (Hartlepool)
- Pte. W. C. Clark, Liverpool Reg. (Liverpool)
- Pte. H. E. Clarke, Machine Gun Corps (Colchester)
- Pte. J. Clarke, RAMC (Lochgelly)
- Sgt. J. Clasper, Durham Light Inf. (Wingate)
- L. Cpl. J. S. Claydon, Cambridgeshire Reg. (Haverhill)
- L. Sgt. J. J. Clear, Liverpool Reg. (Liverpool)
- L. Cpl. R. C. Clough, Royal Engineers (Stretford)
- Pte. A. H. Clucas, East Yorkshire Reg. (Sheffield)
- Pte. G. Clues, Liverpool Reg. (Liverpool)
- Pte. H. G. Coates, Machine Gun Corps (Bolton)
- Sgt. J. B. Coates, Liverpool Reg. (Liverpool)
- Act. Bombr. E. J. H. Cockell, Royal Field Arty. (Upper Sydenham, London)
- Sgt. H. Cocks, Machine Gun Corps (Hawkwell)
- Cpl. E. J. Cole, Royal Fusiliers (Chiswick)
- Pte. J. Cole, Royal Fusiliers (East Sheen)
- Pte. W. Cole, Scots Guards (West Norwood)
- Sgt. G. Collard, Somerset Light Inf. (Taunton)
- Sgt. A. Collier, North Lancashire Reg. (Bolton)
- Sgt. C. Collins, Manchester Reg. (Didsbury)
- Pte. E. D. Collins, RAMC (Middlesbrough)
- L. Cpl. J. Connor, Manchester Reg. (Warrington)
- Pte. W. Cook, Worcestershire Reg. (Birmingham)
- Pte. E. Cooper, Nottinghamshire and Derbyshire Reg. (Chesterfield)
- Sgt. E. Cooper, Worcestershire Reg. (Bridgnorth)
- Bombr. I. Cooper, Royal Field Arty. (Swinton)
- Dvr.P. Cooper, Royal Field Arty. (Southampton)
- Pte. R. W. Cooper, Nottinghamshire and Derbyshire Reg. (Burbage)
- Sgt. T. J. Coppell, King's Royal Rifle Corps (Battersea, London)
- Pte. W. Cork, King's Royal Rifle Corps (Warrington)
- Cpl. J. Corless, Liverpool Reg. (Liverpool)
- Sgt. E. Cornwall, Liverpool Reg. (Liverpool)
- L. Cpl. A. Corson, King's Own Scottish Borderers (Kirkgunzeon)
- Sgt. A. L. Corson, Royal Flying Corps (Welland, Ontario, Canada)
- Cpl. F. A. Cotterill, Gloucestershire Reg. (Smethwick)
- Sgt. B. E. Cottrell, Royal Welsh Fusiliers (Walsall)
- Pte. F. Coupe, North Lancashire Reg. (Preston)
- Pte. J. Cowey, Northumberland Fusiliers (Coundon)
- Dvr. T. Cowie, Army Service Corps (Salford)
- L. Cpl. J. H. Cowley, Manchester Reg. (Manchester)
- Pte. G. W. Company, Nottinghamshire and Derbyshire Reg. (Crowle)
- Sgt. H. Cox, Liverpool Reg. (Blackpool)
- Pte. O. Crack, Cambridgeshire Reg. (Cherry Hinton)
- Pte. R. L. Craigs, Army Service Corps (Bedlington)
- Pte. T. Craner, Coldstream Guards (Stonehouse Arley)
- Sgt. H. Craven, Royal Field Arty. (Rotherne)
- Bombr. T. Craven, Royal Field Arty. (Blackburn)
- Sgt. C. Crealy, Royal Dublin Fusiliers (Rathmines)
- Pte. M. Creaser, Yorkshire Light Inf. (Sheffield)
- Gnr. W. J. Crebbin, Royal Garrison Arty. (Colbey, Isle of Man)
- Pte. A. E. Crocker, King's Own Scottish Borderers (South Croydon)
- Sgt. B. Crosby, Liverpool Reg. (Conway)
- L. Cpl. C. G. Cross, Cambridgeshire Reg. (Cambridge)
- Sgt. W. Cross, South Lancashire Reg. (St. Helens)
- Gnr. L. G. Crossby, Royal Garrison Arty. (Southampton)
- Pte. H. Crothers, Nottinghamshire and Derbyshire Reg. (Boston, U.S.A.)
- Cpl. A. Cruickshanks, King's Own Scottish Borderers (E Huntly, N.B.)
- Pte. H. R. Cullam, South Staffordshire Reg. (Grimsby)
- Pte. L. Cundy, Lancashire Fusiliers (S. Austell)
- Pte. D. Cunningham, North Lancashire Reg. (Derrylaheen)
- Pte. G. Cutler, Border Reg. (Forest Gate)
- L. Cpl. W. Daley, Lancashire Fusiliers (Pendlebury)
- Pte. H T. A. Dane, Royal Fusiliers (Edmonton)
- Pte. E. Dadderton, Liverpool Reg. (Oldham)
- W. C. Daniels, RAMC (Chelmsford)
- Cpl. D. M. Davies, East Lancashire Reg. (Llanpeter)
- Pte. E. Davies, Manchester Reg. (Oldham)
- Pte. E. S. Davies, Welsh Guards (Llandynog)
- Cpl. H. Davies, Worcestershire Reg. (Worcester)
- L. Cpl. T. Davies, Lancashire Fusiliers (Pendleton)
- Pte. W. H. Davies, Royal Berkshire Reg. (Waiworth, London)
- Pte. A. Davenport, Lancashire Fusiliers (Harpurhey)
- Sgt. F. H. Davenport, Manchester Reg. (Northfleet)
- L. Cpl. F. E. Davis, King's Royal Rifle Corps (Harrow)
- Pte. J. E. Deakin, Yeomanry (Surbiton)
- Pte. J. Dean, Liverpool Reg. (Bootle)
- Pte. G. S. Deeley, Royal Warwickshire Reg. (Birmingham)
- L. Cpl. R. Deeming, Royal Warwickshire Reg. (Polesworth Common)
- Cpl. R. Defty, Durham Light Inf. (Seaham Harbour)
- Cpl. J. Delaney, Royal Dublin Fusiliers (E. Carlow)
- Pte. A. Dennison, Royal Scots (Pencaitland)
- Cpl. G. Devey, Grenadier Guards (Mansfield)
- Sgt. J. Dick, Liverpool Reg. (Wallasey)
- L. Cpl. A. Dickens, Lincolnshire Reg. (Spalding)
- Pte. J. Dickenson, Manchester Reg. (Salford)
- C.Q.M.S. J. Dickinson, Lancashire Fusiliers (Newton Heath)
- Sgt. R. Dickinson, East Lancashire Reg. (Tabden)
- Gnr. O. E. Diggett, Royal Field Arty. (Wednesbury)
- Pnr. D. Dillon, Royal Engineers (Scarva)
- Sgt. R. Dinsdale, RAMC (Lindfield)
- Pte. A. C. Diss, Manchester Reg. (Swansea)
- Sgt. J. Dixon, Royal Irish Fusiliers (Ballybay)
- Cpl. F. Dobbs, Royal Lancaster Reg. (Boston)
- Pte. W. Dobson, East Yorkshire Reg. (Bradford)
- J. Dolan, Royal Lancaster Reg. (Kirkham)
- Pte. J. Dolan, Lancashire Fusiliers (Liverpool)
- Pte. T. Donohoe, Royal Dublin Fusiliers (Dublin)
- Sgt. J. Donovan, Lancashire Fusiliers (Manchester)
- Pte. J. H. Donnelly, Liverpool Reg. (Liverpool)
- 1st Class A. Mechanic H. Doran, Royal Flying Corps (Belfast)
- Cpl. T. Dowbekin, North Lancashire Reg. (Bolton)
- Cpl. F. Downs, Machine Gun Corps (Liverpool)
- Sgt. T. Downs, Manchester Reg. (Salford)
- Sgt. H. Doyle, Machine Gun Corps (Glasgow)
- Pte. P. Doyle, Royal Dublin Fusiliers (Leighlin Bridge)
- Sgt. E. E. Drake, Royal Fusiliers (Brighton)
- Pte. H. Drinkwater, Lancashire Fusiliers (Heywood)
- Pte. W. Drummond, Liverpool Reg. (Liverpool)
- Act. Sgt. J. Drury, Nottinghamshire and Derbyshire Reg. (Langley Mill)
- Gnr. F. W. Dugan, Royal Field Arty. (Portsmouth)
- Pte. D. Duffield, Grenadier Guards (Dorking)
- Spr. O. Duke, Royal Engineers (St. Blazey)
- L. Cpl. O. St. A. Duke, Royal Fusiliers (Antigua, British West Indies)
- Pte. E. Dunn, Manchester Reg. (Manchester)
- Pte. D. Dunne, Irish Guards (Belfast)
- Sgt. A. Dunster, Machine Gun Corps (Bexhill)
- Sgt. F. Durbin, Shropshire Light Inf. (Treharris)
- Pte. D. Duthie, Scots Guards (Yateley)
- Pte. H. Dutton, East Lancashire Reg. (Bolton)
- L. Sgt. A. Duxbury, Lancashire Fusiliers (Bury)
- Sgt. T. Dyson, Royal Warwickshire Reg. (Birmingham)
- Pte. J. Eadie, Scots Guards (Musselburgh)
- Pte. E. Eagle, Worcestershire Reg. (Birmingham)
- Gnr. S. Earnshaw, Royal Garrison Arty. (Clapham)
- Cpl. G. T. Eaton, Machine Gun Corps (Manchester)
- Pte. H. Eaton, Manchester Reg. (Dukinfield)
- Pte. J. C. Eccles, Manchester Reg. (Hoylake)
- Pte. D. Edger, Lancashire Fusiliers (Cresswell)
- Pte. E. Edgerton, Lancashire Fusiliers (Heywood)
- Pte. F. R. Edgerton, Rifle Brigade (Clerkenwell)
- Pte. A. Edmonds, Machine Gun Corps (Prestonpans)
- Sgt. E. Edwards, Liverpool Reg. (Formby)
- Cpl. J. E. Edwards, Lancashire Fusiliers (Nelson)
- Sgt. J. H. Edwards, Liverpool Reg. (Southport)
- Sgt. J. S. Edwards, South Lancashire Reg. (Widnes)
- Pte. R. W. Edwards, South Wales Borderers (Songhall Massey)
- Sgt. T.H. Edwards, Royal Field Arty. (Abercynon)
- Pte. E. Eggie, Scots Guards (Blairgowrie)
- L. Cpl. P. S. Elkins, Hertfordshire Reg. (Apsley)
- Pte. A. Elson, East Kent Reg. (Wandsworth)
- L. Cpl. M. Elliot, Cameron Highlanders (E. Perth)
- Pte. O. R. Elliott, Yorkshire Light Inf. (Derbyshire)
- Pte. C. Ellis, Royal Engineers (Croydon)
- Pte. F. C. H. Ellis, Machine Gun Corps (Sydenham)
- Pte. E. Else, Bedfordshire Reg. (Hitchen)
- Bombr. J. K. English, Royal Field Arty. (Dundonald)
- Sgt. T. Entwistle, Lancashire Fusiliers (Bury)
- L. Cpl. G. W. Etheridge, Cambridgeshire Reg. (Whittlesey)
- Pte. J. H. Evans, Shropshire Light Inf. (Ludlow)
- Sgt. W. G. Evans, Machine Gun Corps (Wolverhampton)
- Pte. G. Evanson, Machine Gun Corps (Drayton)
- Pte. H. Everall, RAMC (Malvern Link)
- Sgt. H. Everard, Royal Warwickshire Reg. (Birmingham)
- Cpl. H. Everett, Yeomanry (Balham)
- L. Cpl. B. Evis, Somerset Light Inf. (Ogmore Vale)
- Cpl. W. Fail, Royal Field Arty. (Hetton-le-Hole)
- Pte. D. Falcke, Scots Guards (Holborn, London)
- Sgt. R. Falconer, Royal Warwickshire Reg. (Birmingham)
- A. Cpl. R. Falconer, King's Own Scottish Borderers (Falkirk)
- Pte. J. W. Fallon, North Lancashire Reg. (Bolton)
- L. Cpl. W. Fallows, Lancashire Fusiliers (Middleton)
- Sgt. J. W. Farmer, Machine Gun Corps (Bradford)
- Sgt. J. M. Farquharson, Machine Gun Corps (Aberdeen)
- Pte. H. Farrington, Manchester Reg. (Manchester)
- L. Cpl. T. Farrington, Cambridgeshire Reg. (Cambridge)
- L. Sgt. J. Faulkner, King's Royal Rifle Corps (Oxford)
- Pte. W. Faulkner, Cheshire Reg. (Birmingham)
- L. Cpl. W. Fells, Lancashire Fusiliers (Bolton)
- Dvr. A. Fenwick, Royal Engineers (Burwell, near Louth)
- Sgt. A. O. Ferguson, Manchester Reg. (Laceby)
- Sgt. D. Field, Royal Warwickshire Reg. (Warwick)
- Gnr. F. C. Field, Royal Field Arty. (East Greenwich, London)
- Pte. A. J. Fisher, Army Cyclist Corps (Twickenham)
- Staff Sergeant H. Fisher, RAMC (Abbots Langley)
- Pte. H. Fisher, Lancashire Fusiliers (Preston)
- L. Cpl. H. F. Fisher, Manchester Reg. (Swansea)
- Pte. L. Fisher, Yorkshire Light Inf. (Rotherham)
- Pte. T. C. Fisher, Lancashire Fusiliers (Leytonstone)
- Pte. T. Fitzgerald, Scots Guards (Limerick)
- Pte. J. Fleming, North Lancashire Reg. (Irlam)
- Pte. J. Fleming, Machine Gun Corps (Derry)
- Pte. T. Fletcher, Lancashire Fusiliers (Bury)
- Sgt. T. Fletcher, Coldstream Guards (South Yardley)
- L. Cpl. C. Flowers, East Kent Reg. (Great Stanmore)
- Cpl. H. Floyd, Royal Fusiliers (Bowes Park)
- Pte. G. Foley, Cheshire Reg. (Hyde)
- Pte. J. Foley, Royal Dublin Fusiliers (Fermoy)
- Gnr. A. Forbes, Royal Field Arty. (Huntly)
- Spr. J. Forrest, Royal Engineers (Dennis Town)
- Pte. A. W. Foskett, Kings Royal Rifle Corps (Battersea)
- Pte. L. Foster, Northumberland Fusiliers (Felling-on-Tyne)
- Sgt. F. Fotheringham, Royal Engineers (Manchester)
- Pte. H. E. Foulger, Machine Gun Corps (Newnham)
- Gnr. F. P. Fountaine, Royal Garrison Arty. (Teeton)
- Sgt. A. H. Fox, RAMC (Stockport)
- Pte. O. Fox, Royal Dublin Fusiliers, attd. Machine Gun Company (Kildorney)
- Cpl. F. Fox, East Lancashire Reg. (Ancoats)
- Pte. T. H. Francis, RAMC (Greenwich)
- Cpl. J. C. Fraser, Coldstream Guards (Ghiswick)
- Pte. M. W. Free, Essex Reg. (Southend)
- L. Cpl. J. Freeland, Royal Scots (Aberdeen)
- Sgt. A. Freer, Nottinghamshire and Derbyshire Reg. (Arnold)
- Pte. H. French, Scots Guards (Glasgow)
- Sgt. J. French, King's Own Scottish Borderers (Stonehouse, N.B.)
- Bombr. A. Frith, Royal Field Arty. (Dewsbury)
- Pte. W. Fry, Coldstream Guards (Hoxton, London)
- Pte. R. Fuller, Rifle Brigade (Barking)
- Pte. M. Furey, Liverpool Reg. (Liverpool)
- Sgt. R. Gabriel, Royal Engineers (St. Helens)
- Pte. G. Galley, Manchester Reg. (Oldham)
- Spr. F. Gallimore, Royal Engineers (Averley)
- Pte. W. Gallimore, Liverpool Reg. (New-Brighton)
- Pte. R. Gammon, Rifle Brigade (Regents Park, London)
- Sgt. C. Gardiner, Nottinghamshire and Derbyshire Reg. (Scarcliffe)
- Pte. A. Gardner, North Staffordshire Reg. (Longriggend)
- Pte. C. W. E. Gardner, Somerset Light Inf. (Chard)
- Pte. A. J. Garlick, Nottinghamshire and Derbyshire Reg. (Kettering)
- L. Cpl. W. T. Garnett, Manchester Reg. (Salford)
- Pte. L. Garside, Depot, Yorkshire Light Inf. (Huddersfield)
- Sgt. S. A. E. Gathern, Gloucestershire Reg. (Bermondsey)
- L. Cpl. F. Gatley, Liverpool Reg. (Shaw)
- Pte. A. Gauld, Gordon Highlanders (Glass, Aberdeen)
- Cpl. G. H. Gawler, Royal Engineers (Manchester)
- Pte. W. Gaywood, Royal Warwickshire Reg. (Birmingham)
- Pte. W. Geeves, Lancashire Fusiliers (Tooting, London)
- Sgt. F. H. George, Machine Gun Corps (Sidcup)
- L. Cpl. G. A. Gibbs, Grenadier Guards (Ashbourne)
- Pte. T. Gibbs, Welsh Guards (Newport, Mon.)
- Pte. A. Gibson, Machine Gun Corps (Liverpool)
- Cpl. G. Gifford, Royal Garrison Arty. (Shelford)
- L. Cpl. M. Gilbride, Liverpool Reg. (Ditton)
- L. Cpl. T. Gill, Liverpool Reg. (Newburgh)
- Pte. W. Gillions, Royal Fusiliers (Gamlin
- Sgt. H. J. Gillott, Yeomanry (Cromford)
- L. Cpl. A. Gilmore, York & Lancaster Reg. (Blackburn)
- Pte. H. Ginger, Nottinghamshire and Derbyshire Reg. (Nottingham)
- Pte. C. Glacken, Irish Guards (Kells)
- Pte. J. G. Gleadhall, York & Lancaster Reg. (Rotherham)
- Pte. A. E. Glover, Hertfordshire Reg. (Boxmoor)
- Pte. H. Goddard, East Kent Reg. (Wabberswich)
- Act. L. Cpl. F. E. Godwin, Worcestershire Reg. (Evesham)
- Sgt. J. M. Goodfellow, Coldstream Guards (Crook, Durham)
- Pte. C. J. H. Goodwin, North Lancashire Reg. (Liverpool)
- L. Cpl. F. Goodwin, Royal Fusiliers (Longton)
- Pte. J. Gordon, Royal Highlanders (Dundee)
- Sgt. W. Gordon, Manchester Reg. (Beswick)
- Cpl. C. Gore, Liverpool Reg. (Liverpool)
- Sgt. T. Gore, Lancashire Fusiliers (Wigan)
- L. Cpl. F. Gorton, North Lancashire Reg. (Chorley)
- Pte. A. Gosling, Hampshire Reg. (Winchester)
- L. Cpl. W. F. Gosson, Middlesex Reg. (Willesden)
- Pte. W. Gough, Worcestershire Reg. (Stourbridge)
- L. Cpl. E. Goulding, Lincolnshire Reg. (Lincoln)
- Pte. J. H. Govan, Scots Guards (Prestonkirk)
- Pte. L. Gleave, King's Royal Rifle Corps (Rochdale)
- Pte. L. Grace, Royal Dublin Fusiliers (Clontarf)
- Pte. C. Graham, Royal Scots (Kirkintillock)
- Pte. T. Graham, Border Reg. (Carlisle)
- Pte. F. Grant, Scots Guards (Greenham)
- Sgt. F. G. Gray, Royal Field Arty. (Roydon)
- Cpl. H. Gray, Royal Engineers (West Hartlepool)
- Pte. J. S. Gray, Gordon Highlanders (Banchory)
- Pte. G. Greaves, Nottinghamshire and Derbyshire Reg. (Balborough)
- L. Cpl. A. H. Green, Royal Engineers (Notting Hill)
- Sgt. J. V. Green, RAMC (Handsworth)
- Sgt. J. W. Green, Manchester Reg. (Oldham)
- Act. Cpl. S. Green, South Lancashire Reg. (St. Helens)
- Pte. W. Greenan, Argyll and Sutherland Highlanders (Irvine)
- Pte. T. Greenhalgh, North Lancashire Reg. (Bolton)
- Pte. R. Greenwood, North Lancashire Reg. (Bradshaw)
- Cpl. D. S. Greer, Royal Highlanders (Glasgow)
- Pte. W. H. Gregory, Manchester Reg. (Didsbury)
- Sgt. T. Griffin, East Yorkshire Reg. (Market Rasen)
- Pte. A. Griffiths, Coldstream Guards (Cottage Mold)
- Gnr. E. Griffiths, Royal Field Arty. (Porthmadog)
- L. Cpl. J. Griffiths, Worcestershire Reg. (Wollaston)
- Pte. R. J. Griffiths, Worcestershire Reg. (Madeley)
- Act. Bombr. J. Grimmond, Royal Garrison Arty. (Edinburgh)
- Cpl. C. Grognet, North Lancashire Reg. (Bolton)
- Pte. H. Groves, Scots Guards (Liverpool)
- L. Cpl. E. Grubb, Bedfordshire Reg. (Luton)
- Cpl. E. J. Gruncell, Royal Engineers (Tottenham)
- Sgt. G. Grundy, East Lancashire Reg. (Colchester)
- Pte. J. Grundy, Lancashire Fusiliers (Bury)
- Pte. W. Gunner, Royal Fusiliers (Banning)
- Pte. W. G. Gurney, Machine Gun Corps (Ross)
- Cpl. J. Gwinnutt, Lancashire Fusiliers (Rochdale)
- Pte. F. Hack, Hampshire Reg. (Headley)
- L. Sgt. G. S. Hacking, Cheshire Reg. (Gilesmere Port)
- Cpl. W. Hagger, King's Royal Rifle Corps (Bethnal Green)
- Pte. B. R. Hall, Middlesex Reg. (Paddington)
- Pte. M. Hall, Worcestershire Reg. (Stourbridge)
- Pte. T. Hall, Lancashire Fusiliers (Bolton)
- Cpl. T. J. Hall, Durham Light Inf. (Lanchester)
- Sgt. P. W. Halls, Royal Field Arty. (Ilfbrd)
- 2nd Cpl. J. Hallsall, Royal Engineers (St. Helens)
- L. Cpl. C. Hamilton, Machine Gun Corps (Harrow Road)
- Act. Bombr. J. Hancock, Royal Garrison Arty. (Cardiff)
- Pte. J. H. Handley, Manchester Reg. (Manchester)
- Sgt. J. Hands, South Lancashire Reg. (St. Helens)
- Pte. H. F. Hanes, Grenadier Guards (Manchester)
- Pte. R. Hankin, Liverpool Reg. (Litherland)
- Sgt. A. Hannah, King's Own Scottish Borderers (Kilmarnock)
- Spr. J. Hannaway, Royal Engineers (Fulham)
- Pte. M. Hanney, Lancashire Fusiliers (Bruree)
- Pte. A. Harborne, Royal Warwickshire Reg. (Birmingham)
- Pte. V. Harding, Liverpool Reg. (Southport)
- C.Q.M.S. A. Hardman, Lancashire Fusiliers (Middleton)
- Pte. R. Hardman, North Lancashire Reg. (Bolton)
- Pte. H. Hardwick, Coldstream Guards (Hull)
- Cpl. F. Hardy, North Lancashire Reg. (Bolton)
- Bombr. W. Hargreaves, Royal Field Arty. (Burnley)
- L. Cpl. J. Harkin, East Lancashire Reg. (Blackburn)
- Sgt. J. A. Harley, Glamorgan Royal Garrison Arty. (Cadoxton)
- Pte. J. Harpham, Yorkshire Light Inf. (Nottingham)
- Pte. J. Harrigan, East Kent Reg. (Chatham)
- Sgt. A. E. Harris, Honourable Arty. Company (Exeter)
- Pte. B. Harris, Worcestershire Reg. (Birmingham)
- Pte. G. E. Harris, Machine Gun Corps (Upper Edmonton)
- Cpl. G. W. Harris, Royal Field Arty. (Leamington)
- Pte. H. Harris, King's Royal Rifle Corps (Peckham)
- Sgt. J. Harris, Worcestershire Reg. (Warminster)
- A. L. C. F. W. Harrison, Lancashire Fusiliers (Atherton)
- Cpl. G. B. Harrison, Royal Field Arty. (E. Woolwich)
- Pte. P. Harrison, Liverpool Reg. (Liverpool
- Pnr. R. Harrison, Royal Engineers (Stretford)
- Cpl. R. C. Harrison, Manchester Reg. (West Houghtoh)
- Pte. W. Harrison, Cheshire Reg. (Crewe)
- Pte. G. Hartley, North Lancashire Reg. (Chorley)
- L. Cpl. L. Hartley, Rifle Brigade (Langshaw Bridge)
- Pte. O. Hartwell, RAMC (Harrowden)
- Pte. T. Harvey, Lancashire Fusiliers (Stoke Newington)
- Sgt. A. E. Harwood, Liverpool Reg. (Liverpool)
- Sgt. A. Hasty, East Lancashire Reg. (Padiham)
- L. Sgt. C. G. Hatton, Grenadier Guards (Bermondsey, London)
- Bombr. J. Hatton, Royal Field Arty. (Kirkby)
- Pte. A. T. Hawker, Liverpool Reg. (Liverpool)
- L. Sgt. H. Hawksworth, Coldstream Guards (Sheffield)
- L. Cpl. J. J. Hayes, Nottinghamshire and Derbyshire Reg. (Warsop)
- Pte. E. Haysham, Somerset Light Inf. (Bridgwater)
- Pte. C. Haywood, Worcestershire Reg. (Dudley)
- Pte. F. A. V. Haywood, Machine Gun (Corps (Byfleet)
- Cpl. B. Hazlewood, Hampshire Reg. (Coventry)
- Pte. R. Hazzard, Royal Berkshire Reg. (Portsea)
- Dvr. W. Healey, Royal Field Arty. (Bolton)
- L. Sgt. J. W. Healy, Manchester Reg. (Old Trafford)
- Pte. W. E. Heard, Machine Gun Corps (E. Barnstaple)
- L. Cpl. P. T. Heath, South Wales Borderers (Machen)
- Cpl. J. Heaton, North Lancashire Reg. (Wigan)
- L. Cpl. E. Hedges, Royal Lancaster Reg. (Bramford)
- Sgt. W. Hedley, Somerset Light Inf. (Amble)
- Cpl. W. Heeley, Liverpool Reg. (Bootle)
- Dvr. J. D. Henderson, Royal Field Arty. (Ford)
- Pte. P. Henri, Liverpool Reg. (Birkenhead)
- Sgt. J. Henshaw, Liverpool Reg. (Bootle)
- Pte. J. F. Hertwick, Lancashire Fusiliers (Blyth)
- L. Cpl. C. T. Hewitt, Machine Gun Corps (Norfolk)
- Pte. W. Hicks, Manchester Reg. (Llantrisant)
- Pte. J. Higgins, East Kent Reg. (Sandwich)
- Sgt. J. Higham, Liverpool Reg. (Liverpool)
- Sgt. R. L. Highmore, Royal Engineers (Old Kent Rd., London)
- Pte. A. C. Hill, Worcestershire Reg. (Worcester)
- Cpl. J. Hill, Machine Gun Corps (Perth)
- Pte. J. Hill, King's Royal Rifle Corps (London)
- Pte. S. Hill, Worcestershire Reg. (Old Hill)
- Cpl. E. Hillock, Irish Guards (Wexford)
- Sgt. R. Hinde, Manchester Reg. (Shepherd's Bush)
- C.Q.M.S. W. G. Hinds, Royal Lancaster Reg. (Ulverston)
- Pte. A. W. Hinxman, Army Service Corps (Chiswick, London)
- Cpl. W. F. Hippmann, Royal Fusiliers (Fulham)
- L. Cpl. G. Hiron, Worcestershire Reg. (Worcester)
- Pte. N. Hirst, King's Own Scottish Borderers (Golcar)
- Pte. G. W. Hobbs, Oxfordshire & Buckinghamshire Light Inf. (Handslope)
- Pte. E. Hobson, York & Lancaster Reg. (Edmonton, Alberta, Canada)
- Pte. F. Hodgson, RAMC (York)
- Pte. R. W. Hodgson, Lancashire Fusiliers (Nitherton)
- Pte. F. Hodson, RAMC (Burton Latimer)
- Sgt. E. Holbeche, Royal Field Arty. (Button Coldfield)
- Pte. W. H. Holden, East Lancashire Reg. (Accrington)
- Sgt. G. Holland, Cheshire Reg. (Stockport)
- Pte. J. Holland, Hertfordshire Reg. (Harpenden)
- Gnr. A. Hollingworth, Royal Field Arty. (Warrington)
- Pte. J. Hollis, Nottinghamshire and Derbyshire Reg. (Mansfield)
- Sgt. F. Holloway, Royal Warwickshire Reg. (Birmingham)
- Pte. J. E. Holmes, Lancashire Fusiliers (Carlisle)
- Dvr. O. J. Holmes, Royal Field Arty. (Wimbledon)
- Pte. P. S. Holmes, Nottinghamshire and Derbyshire Reg. (South Normanton)
- Pte. G. W. Holt, Lancashire Fusiliers (Radcliffe)
- Pte. J. Holt, Lancashire Fusiliers (Patricroft)
- Pte. A. Hooper, Hampshire Reg. (Southampton)
- Sgt. J. Hope, Durham Light Inf. (Chester-le-Street)
- Pte. H. Hopkin, Machine Gun Corps (Grimsby)
- Pte. J. Hotchin, Lincolnshire Reg. (Scunthorpe)
- Pte. H. B. Hotchkiss, South Lancashire Reg. (Widnes)
- Pte. N. Hough, RAMC (Alderney)
- Act. Cpl. R. Houghton, South Lancashire Reg. (St. Helens)
- Cpl. E. Howard, Lancashire Fusiliers (Southwark)
- Cpl. F. Howard, East Kent Reg. (Sandwich)
- Pte. J. Howe, Manchester Reg. (Pontardawe)
- L. Cpl. R. J. Howorth, Lancashire Fusiliers (Denshaw)
- Pte. G. Hubball, Cheshire Reg. (Northwich)
- Sgt. H. O. Hubbards, Welsh Reg. (Cardiff)
- Pte. J. H. Hughes, Liverpool Reg. (Liverpool)
- Pte. T. Hughes, Liverpool Reg. (Miles Platting)
- Pte. T. Humphreys, North Lancashire Reg. (Bolton)
- Pte. G. F. Hunt, Liverpool Reg. (Skipton)
- Pte. J. W. Hunt, Lancashire Fusiliers, attd. Machine Gun Company (Wormer Bridge)
- Pte. J. J. Hunter, King's Own Scottish Borderers (Maxwelltown)
- L. Cpl. C. Hurrell, Machine Gun Corps (Peterborough)
- Pte. E. Hurst, North Lancashire Reg. (Bolton)
- Pte. W. Hutchinson, York & Lancaster Reg. (Denaby Main)
- Sgt. H. Hyam, Liverpool Reg. (Liverpool)
- Sgt. E. Ingham, Lancashire Fusiliers (Bradford)
- Cpl. A. I. Ingram, Scots Guards (Edinburgh)
- L. Cpl. R. H. Ingram, Royal Fusiliers (Richmond)
- Pte. A. Insley, Manchester Reg. (Stanton)
- Cpl. W. F. Irving, Border Reg. (Carlisle)
- L. Cpl. A. Ison, Machine Gun Corps (Raynes Park)
- Pte. A. Jackson, Lancashire Fusiliers (Rhodes)
- Pte. E. T. Jackson, Machine Gun Corps (Leeds)
- Pte. J. Jackson, Border Reg. (Maryport)
- Cpl. J. Jackson, King's Royal Rifle Corps (Berraondsey)
- Pte. T. E. Jackson, Liverpool Reg. (Ashton-under-Lyne)
- Sgt. T. R. Jackson, RAMC (St. Helens)
- Pte. F. Jacob, Royal Warwickshire Reg. (E. Coventry)
- Pte. J. James, Royal Fusiliers (Bethnal Green)
- Pte. R. W. James, Lancashire Fusiliers (Hamsterley Colliery)
- Pte. H. Jenkins, Welsh Reg. (Cardiff)
- Sgt. S. Jenner, Manchester Reg. (Old Trafford)
- Pte. P. Jennings, Royal Fusiliers, attd. Machine Gun Company (Bradford)
- Pte. H. H. Jerram, Hampshire Reg. (Winchester)
- Dvr. J. Jessop, Army Service Corps (Beverley)
- Dvr. C. H. Jewkes, Royal Field Arty. (Dudley)
- Pte. A. Jeynes, Machine Gun Corps (Tewkesbury)
- Sgt. A. Johnson, Cheshire Reg. (Hyde)
- Cpl. A. E. Johnson, Welsh Guards (Stoke-sub-Hambdon)
- Pte. A. J. Johnson, Machine Gun Corps (Leighton)
- Pte. A. W. Johnson, Coldstream Guards (Hull)
- Pte. E. Johnson, Coldstream Guards (Hull)
- Sgt. H. Johnson, Royal Fusiliers (Burslem)
- Pte. H. P. Jonnson, Manchester Reg. (Mancheater)
- Pte. W. Johnson, Liverpool Reg. (Southport)
- Pte. W. H. Johnson Nottinghamshire and Derbyshire Reg. (Holme Chapel)
- Pte. J. Jolly, Royal Highlanders (Montrose)
- Pte. R. Jolly, Rifle Brigade (East Greenwich)
- Gnr. A. Jones, Royal Garrison Arty. (Bangor)
- Gnr. C. Jones, Royal Field Arty. (Ris-Ca)
- Pte. F. Jones, South Wales Borderers (Curnfilinfach)
- Pte. G. L. Jones, Liverpool Reg. (New Brighton)
- Pte. H. Jones, Lancashire Fusiliers (Lr. Broughton)
- Pte. L. Jones, North Lancashire Reg. (Rhos)
- Cpl. L. Jones, Liverpool Reg. (Liverpool)
- 2nd Cpl. R. J. Jones, Royal Engineers (E. Chatham)
- Pte. T. Jones, RAMC (Brymbo)
- Pte. T. E. Jones, North Lancashire Reg. (Oswestry)
- Pte. V. S. Jones, Yeomanry (Derby)
- Dvr. W. J. Jones, Royal Field Arty. (Meath)
- F. Jordan, East Yorkshire Reg. (Wolverhampton)
- L. Cpl. F. Kay, Machine Gun Company (Keighley)
- Pte. J. Keable, Machine Gun Corps (Norwich)
- Pte. T. Keane, Machine Gun Guards (Lorey)
- Pte. J. H. Keddie, Royal Highlanders (South-Woodford)
- Pte. J. Keefe, Liverpool Reg. (Buttevant, County Cork)
- E. Keen Royal Fusiliers (Swalecliff)
- L. Cpl. W. J. Keenan, Worcestershire Reg. (New Bilton)
- Pte. E. Kelly, Irish Guards (Newcastle West)
- Pte. P. Kelly, Royal Dublin Fusiliers (Dublin)
- L. Cpl. J. E. Kelsall, Lancashire Fusiliers (Rochdale)
- Dvr. J. Kenny, Royal Field Arty. (Bradford)
- L. Cpl. C. R. Kent, Scottish Rifles (Castleford)
- Spr. H. Kenyon, Royal Engineers (Stockport)
- Pte. J. Kerr, Royal Warwickshire Reg. (Addiewell)
- Pte. W. Keyte, Worcestershire Reg. (Broadway)
- Sgt. J. Kilpatrick, Machine Gun Corps (Bellshill)
- Sgt. C. W. M. King, Argyll and Sutherland Highlanders (Monmouth)
- Sgt. J. King, Hertfordshire Reg. (Royston)
- L. Cpl. S. H. King, Durham Light Inf. (Ipswich)
- Sgt. W. G. A. King, Middlesex Reg. (Hornsey)
- L. Cpl. T. Kingston, Worcestershire Reg. (Birmingham)
- Pte. J. Kirk, Scottish Rifles (Bonnybridge)
- Spr. J. H. Kirkman, Royal Engineers (Chellaston)
- Sgt. W. H. Kirley, Worcestershire Reg. (Bristol)
- Pte. G. E. Kitchen, York & Lancaster Reg. (Masboro)
- Pte. W. Kitchen, South Lancashire Reg. (Ryliops Colliery, County Durham)
- Pte. A. P. Knight, RAMC (Warwick)
- L. Cpl. J. Knowles, Royal Warwickshire Reg. (Birmingham)
- Sgt. R. Knowles, North Lancashire Reg. (Preston)
- Cpl. E. H. Lacey, Somerset Light Inf. (Exmouth)
- Pte. P. Lacy, Nottinghamshire and Derbyshire Reg. (Balderton)
- Pte. F. Lamb, Liverpool Reg. (Liverpool)
- Pte. S. Lamb, Nottinghamshire and Derbyshire Reg. (Mansfield)
- Gnr. C. G. Lambert, Royal Field Arty. (Ardrossan)
- Pte. J. R. Lambert, Rifle Brigade (Lowestoft)
- Act. Sgt. E. Lane, King's Royal Rifle Corps (Leyton, London)
- Pte. H. E. Lane, Nottinghamshire and Derbyshire Reg. (Chesterfield)
- Pte. J. Langfield, Manchester Reg. (Oldham)
- Sgt. R. Law, East Lancashire Reg. (Padham)
- Pte. F. C. Lawrence, King's Royal Rifle Corps (Battersea, London)
- Pte. W. V. Lawrence, East Yorkshire Reg. (Ashford)
- Pte. R. Lea, Coldstream Guards (Ormskirk)
- Sgt. F. Leach, Lancashire Fusiliers (Rochdale)
- Sgt. A. P. Leather, Liverpool Reg. (Evertan)
- Cpl. J. Leatherbarrow, Liverpool Reg. (Bootle)
- L. Cpl. A. Lee, Liverpool Reg. (Liverpool)
- L. Cpl. F. Lee, Bedfordshire Reg. (Wormley)
- Sgt. R. Lee, Liverpool Reg. (Ormskirk)
- Cpl. H. E. A. Legh, London Reg. (Cosham)
- Sgt. S. Leighton, Shropshire Light Inf. (Wellington)
- L. Cpl. J. Leroy, Liverpool Reg. (Rarbury, Mass., U.S.A.)
- Gnr. A. C. Lewis, Royal Field Arty. (St. George's, London)
- Pte. D. T. Lewis, Manchester Reg. (Levenshulme)
- Sgt. R. J. Lewis, Shropshire Light Inf. (Whitchuroh)
- Pte. W. J. Lewis, Welsh Guards (Milford Haven)
- Sgt. J. A. Lingwood, Honourable Arty. Company (Highbury)
- Sgt. F. C. Linseay, Cambridgeshire Reg. (Cambridge)
- Pte. M. C. Lisney, Scots Guards (Grays)
- Pte. A. Little, Argyll and Sutherland Highlanders (Methilhill)
- Sgt. G. Little, Gloucestershire Reg. (Cheltenham)
- Cpl. W. Littlewood, Durham Light Inf. Hetton-le-Hole)
- Cpl. A. Livingstone, RAMC (Dundee)
- Sgt. E. Lockey, Royal Lancaster Reg. (Mattock)
- Sgt. J. Lomax, RAMC (Eccles)
- Pte. T. G. Long, Yorkshire Light Inf. (Darlington)
- L. Cpl. E. Longsbottom, East Yorkshire Reg. (Boston, U.S.A.)
- Pte. N. Longton, Cheshire Reg. (Whittle-le-Woods)
- Pte. D. Looney, Irish Guards (Cork)
- Sgt. J. H. Lord, Liverpool Reg. (Birkdale)
- Pte. H. Lovett, Machine Gun Corps (Radcliffe)
- Pte. R. Lowdon, East Yorkshire Reg. (Waskerley)
- Pte. C. W. Lowe, Border Reg. (Platt Bridge)
- Pte. W. Lowe, Manchester Reg. (Guilden Sutton)
- Pte. W. J. Lowe, Rifle Brigade (Bermondsey)
- Cpl. C. Lowin, Machine Gun Corps (Bknkney)
- Pte. T. G. Lucas, Welsh Guards (Cardiff)
- L. Cpl. P. A. Ludbrook, Royal Engineers (Mexboro)
- Pte. W. Lyle, Argyll and Sutherland Highlanders (Glasgow)
- Cpl. W. E. Lyon, York & Lancaster Reg. (Collingham)
- Private G. H. Lyons, Machine Gun Corps (Sheffield)
- Far. Sergeant W. Mackie, Royal Field Arty. (Largs, Ayrshire)
- L. Sgt. B. Madden, Liverpool Reg. (Liverpool)
- Sgt. C. Madden, Liverpool Reg. (Liverpool)
- L. Cpl. G. T. Maguire, Liverpool Reg. (Liverpool)
- Pte. J. Maguire, Irish Guards (Blacklion)
- Pte. M. Maher, Royal Dublin Fusiliers (Stirling)
- Pte. J. Major, Devonshire Reg. (Moretonhampstead)
- Sgt. H. Maltby, Machine Gun Corps (Breastin)
- Pte. A. Mands, Royal Highlanders (Dundee)
- Sgt. W. C. Manley, Royal Berkshire Reg. (South Acton, London)
- Sgt. A. Mansfield, Middlesex Reg. (E. Hounslow)
- Sgt. C. H. Mansfield, Yeomanry (Bakewell)
- Pte. J. Mansfield, Yeomanry (Bakewell)
- Pte. J. W. Mansfield, Duke of Cornwall's Light Inf. (Battersea)
- Bombr. J. Marker, Royal Garrison Arty. (Herne Hill)
- Pte. W. Marsden, Cheshire Reg. (Stockport)
- L. Cpl. H. Marsh, Machine Gun Corps (Edge Hill)
- Pte. T. Marshall, Machine Gun Corps (Blackpool)
- L. Cpl. J. C. Marston, Royal Warwickshire Reg. (Nuneaton)
- Pte. A. H. Martin, Somerset Light Inf. (Walthamstow)
- Sgt. A. T. Martin, Hampshire Reg. (Portsmouth)
- Pte. E. V. Martin, Royal Fusiliers (Faversham)
- Pte. D. Martin, Manchester Reg. (Beswick)
- Pnr. F. J. Marven, Royal Engineers (West Hampstead)
- Pte. W. C. Maskell, Royal Warwickshire Reg. (Stockton, near Rugby)
- Pte. J. T. Mason, Machine Gun Corps (Birmingham)
- Sgt. L. Mason, North Lancashire Reg. (Bolton)
- Pte. T. Mason, Machine Gun Corps (Kendal)
- Dvr. G. T. Masters, Royal Field Arty. (East Ham, London)
- L. Cpl. T. Matthews, Royal Fusiliers (Hauwell)
- Cpl. T. E. Matthews, Devonshire Reg. (Exmouth)
- L. Cpl. G. Mawson, Royal Lancaster Reg. (Lancaster)
- Sgt. G. Maxwell, Liverpool Reg. (Glasgow)
- Pte. G. May, Royal Fusiliers (Canterbury)
- Sgt. J. W. May, Royal Engineers (Ilford)
- Pte. J. A. Maycock, Royal Warwickshire Reg. (Rugby)
- Pte. J. Mayfield, Nottinghamshire and Derbyshire Reg. (Sutton-in-Ashfield)
- Pte. W. Mayoh, East Lancashire Reg. (Bolton)
- Pte. J. D. McArdle, Lancashire Fusiliers (Rochdale)
- Pte. J. McAteer, Irish Guards (Strathbane)
- L. Cpl. J. McBrier, Machine Gun Corps (Gartsherrie)
- Pte. J. McCabe, Irish Guards (Carrickmacross)
- L. Cpl. E. McCann, King's Own Scottish Borderers (Edinburgh)
- Sgt. M. J. McCarthy, Royal Dublin Fusiliers (Bootle)
- Pte. A. McColl, Yorkshire Light Inf. (Borstal)
- L. Cpl. C. McCormick, Liverpool Reg. (Liverpool)
- Cpl. J. McDermott, RAMC (St. Helens)
- Cpl. H. McDonald, Scottish Rifles (Glasgow)
- Pte. J. McDonald, Scots Guards (Cluny by Tillygowrie)
- Pte. A. J. McDougall, Scots Guards (Boston, U.S.A.)
- Cpl. G. H. McDowell, Lancashire Fusiliers (Openshaw)
- Pte. W. McEwan, Scottish Rifles (Glasgow)
- Pte. J. McGillivray, Lancashire Fusiliers (Pendleton)
- Pte. W. McGloughlin, Lancashire Fusiliers (Rochdale)
- Pte. F. McGowan, Liverpool Reg. (Liverpool)
- Pte. H. McGowan, Scottish Rifles (Motherwell)
- Bombr. J. T. McGraa, Royal Fusiliers (E. Carlisle)
- Pte. W. A. McIntosh, Grenadier Guards (Ayr)
- Cpl. M. McKiernan, Irish Guards (Clooney Quin)
- Spr. D. McKinnon, Royal Engineers (Appin)
- Pte. D. McLay, Royal Scots (Lochgelly)
- L. Cpl. J. McLean, Royal Engineers (Stretford)
- Pte. A. McLelland, Argyll and Sutherland Highlanders (Johnstone)
- Pte. D. A. C. McLennan, Royal Highlanders (Kirkcaldy)
- L. Cpl. W. McLennan, Manchester Reg. (Moss Side, Manchester)
- Pte. B. McLoughlin, East Lancashire Reg. (Accrington)
- Pte. J. McMahon, Liverpool Reg. (Seacombe)
- L. Cpl. L. McMaster, Argyll and Sutherland Highlanders (Glasgow)
- L. Cpl. D. McNab, King's Royal Rifle Corps (Edinburgh)
- Sgt. J. W. McNiff, Liverpool Reg. (Bootle)
- Sgt. F. C. Meaby, Cambridgeshire Reg. (Cambridge)
- Pte. E. Meagher, Liverpool Reg. (Liverpool)
- Sgt. J. G. Meason, Royal Fusiliers (Acton)
- Cpl. P. G. Meddoms, Royal Field Arty. (Edgware)
- Sgt. A. Medgett, East Kent Reg. (Garden-stone)
- Cpl. C. Melia, North Lancashire Reg. (St. Helens)
- Pte. A. Mellor, Manchester Reg. (Ardwick)
- Pte. T. Mellor, Nottinghamshire and Derbyshire Reg. (E. Derby.)
- Gnr. A. L. Melville, Royal Field Arty. (Carmyle)
- Sgt. J. Melvin, Royal Field Arty. (Aberdeen)
- Cpl. A H. Merry, Cambridgeshire Reg. (Cherry Hinton)
- Cpl. A. V. Metcalfe, Royal Field Arty. (Skipton)
- L. Cpl. J. Middleton, Lancashire Fusiliers (Ince)
- Cpl. W. R. Mildred, Royal Field Arty. (Norwich)
- Cpl. F. Miles, Worcestershire Reg. (Bridgnorth)
- Pte. W. Miller, Royal Fusiliers (Notting Hill)
- Pte. J. Millet, Liverpool Reg. (Liverpool)
- L. Cpl. G. Milnes, Lancashire Fusiliers (Manchester)
- L. Sgt. J. Miskella, South Lancashire Reg. (Widnes)
- Sgt. J. W. Mitchell, Machine Gun Corps (Newbigge-by-Sea)
- Pte. G. Moore, Cheshire Reg. (Barnton, near Northwich)
- Pte. H. W. Moore, Hampshire Reg. (Sheffield)
- Sgt. W. Moore, Manchester Reg. (Ardwick)
- Cpl. W. H. Moore, Liverpool Reg. (Liverpool)
- Pte. W. J. Moore, Hampshire Reg. (Winchester)
- Sgt. I. J. H. Morgan, Liverpool Reg. (Farmby)
- Pte. M. D. Morgan, York & Lancaster Reg. (Maesteg)
- Cpl. N. Morgan, Liverpool Reg. (Liverpool)
- Pte. W. Morgan, Lancashire Fusiliers (Stoke Newington, London)
- Cpl. W. A. Morgan, Royal Field Arty. (Cleethorpes)
- Pte. W. R. Morgan, Royal Fusiliers (Blackburn)
- L. Cpl. W. Morland, Durham Light Inf. (Sunderland)
- Sgt. A. E. Morley, Liverpool Reg. (Liverpool)
- L. Cpl. J. Morris, Royal Engineers (Willenhall)
- Pte. J. Morris, Lancashire Fusiliers (Liverpool)
- Pte. T.Morris, Liverpool Reg. (Liverpool)
- Pte. A. Morrison, Royal Highlanders (Dundee)
- Pte. A. Morrison, RAMC (Aberdeen)
- Cpl. G. Mottram, Manchester Reg. (Withington)
- Cpl. J. S. Moyens, Coldstream Guards (Bardon Hill)
- L. Cpl. A. Mudie, Royal Engineers (Shrewsbury)
- Pte. W. E. Muggleton, South Staffordshire Reg. (Leicester)
- Pte. W. R. Mullard, Liverpool Reg. (Liverpool)
- Pte. W. H. Mullett, Royal Warwickshire Reg. (Bath)
- Pte. E. Mulligan, Royal Dublin Fusiliers (Aldershot)
- Sgt. S. W. Mullins, Royal Field Arty. (St. Heliers)
- Pte. W. J. Munday, Middlesex Reg. (Worthing)
- Gnr. J. R. Murdoch, Royal Field Arty. (Gateshead)
- Pte. H. Murphey, Cheshire Reg. (Stockport)
- L. Sgt. J. Murphy, North Lancashire Reg. (Liverpool)
- Sgt. T. Murray, Royal Highlanders (Anstruther)
- Sgt. H. Myers, Royal Lancaster Reg. (Roose)
- Pte. W. F. Mitchell, East Lancashire Reg. (Liverpool)
- Sgt. P. J. Mitchelson, RAMC (Glasgow)
- Fitter T. C. Mobbs, Royal Field Arty. (Fulham)
- Cpl. W. H. Molyneux, Lancashire Fusiliers (Salford)i
- Spr. W. Monro, Royal Engineers (Prestonpans)
- L. Cpl. R. Montgomerie, Liverpool Reg. (Liverpool)
- Spr. B. S. Moody, Royal Engineers (Enfield)
- Pte. R. Moon, East Lancashire Reg. (Wesham)
- Cpl. P. Mooney, Royal Engineers (E. Dublin)
- Spr. C. Moore, Royal Engineers (Dalston, London)
- Sgt. C. E. Moore, Machine Gun Corps (Rottingr dean)
- Sgt. E. Moore, Nottinghamshire and Derbyshire Reg. (Stapleford)
- Pte. A. Nash, Rifle Brigade (Caterham)
- Pte. A. Nash, Royal Fusiliers (S. Tottenham)
- Pte. W. J. Nash, Royal Warwickshire Reg. (Birmingham)
- Cpl. J. Naylor, Royal Engineers (St. Helens)
- Pte. H. Neail, Nottinghamshire and Derbyshire Reg. (Nottingham)
- Pte. H. Needham, Machine Gun Guards (Darley Abbey)
- L. Cpl. A. Negus, Rifle Brigade (Camden Town)
- L. Cpl. J. Neil, Scottish Rifles (Glasgow)
- Sgt. H. New, Royal Field Arty. (Bournemouth)
- Pte. J. A. Newis, Royal Berkshire Reg. (Tunbridge)
- Act. Bombr. R. T. Newman, Royal Field Arty. (South Shields)
- Pte. M. Newton, Nottinghamshire and Derbyshire Reg. (Belper)
- L. Cpl. D. G. Nichols, Royal Fusiliers (Sunderland)
- Sgt. H. Nichols, Lancashire Fusiliers (Bury)
- Pte. W. C. Northey, Durham Light Inf. (Fencehouses)
- L. Cpl. J. Nye, Royal Engineers (E. Newcastle upon Tyne)
- Sgt. H. W. Oakes, Grenadier Guards (Hutton, Essex)
- Pte. W. O'Brien, Irish Guards (Inniscarra)
- L. Cpl. G. O'Connell, Liverpool Reg. (Liverpool)
- Pte. T. O'Dea, Irish Guards (Kilrush)
- 2nd Cpl. G. W. Odell, Royal Engineers (Bedford)
- L. Cpl. A. Offiler, Lincolnshire Reg. (Grimsby)
- Pte. J. O'Hara, Lancashire Fusiliers (Heywood)
- Sgt. J. O'Neill, Irish Guards (Cork)
- Pte. R. J. Ord, Yorkshire Light Inf. (Durham)
- L. Cpl. P. O'Reilly, Manchester Reg. (Gorton)
- L. Cpl. L. Orpin, Bedfordshire Reg. (Bromham)
- Pnr. F. W. Osborn, Royal Engineers (Chesterton)
- Pte. G. Owen, Lancashire Fusiliers (Todmorden)
- L. Sgt. G. Packer, Rifle Brigade (Northampton)
- Pte. J. Padley, Royal Scots Fusiliers (Ashton-under-Lyne)
- Cpl. W. J. Paine, Royal Fusiliers (Staines)
- Cpl. F. M. Paish, Wiltshire Reg. (Mildenhall)
- Pte. A. S. Palmer, Hampshire Reg. (Bristol)
- Pte. F. Palmer, Lancashire Fusiliers (Radcliffe)
- Pte. T. Park, North Lancashire Reg. (Preston)
- Sgt. A. A. Parker, Hampshire Reg. (Stockbridge)
- Pte. F. J. Parker, East Yorkshire Reg. (Calverton)
- Sgt. W. J. Parker, Manchester Reg. (Manchester)
- Sgt. S. T. Parkinson, King's Own Scottish Borderers (Manchester)
- Pte. T. Parkinson, North Lancashire Reg. (Preston)
- Sgt. J. Parmley, Durham Light Inf. (Felling)
- Pte. G. R. Parsons, Nottinghamshire and Derbyshire Reg. (Skegby)
- Pte. W. J. Parsons, King's Royal Rifle Corps (Walworth, London)
- Act. Sgt. T. Pattenden, Liverpool Reg. (Hindley)
- Sgt. S. B. Patterson, Royal Warwickshire Reg. (Walsall)
- Pte. J. N. Paul, Scots Guards (Dumgoyne)
- Cpl. C. J. Payne, King's Royal Rifle Corps (Manor Park, London)
- L. Cpl. D. R. Payne, Worcestershire Reg. (Quidhampton)
- Sgt. L. Peake, King's Own Scottish Borderers (Hanley, Staffs.)
- Pte. C. W. Pear, York & Lancaster Reg. (Sneinton)
- Pte. C. G. Pearce, Scots Guards (Ling field, Surrey)
- Pte. G. Pearson, East Surrey Reg. (Walton-on-Thames)
- Sgt. J. Pearson, Durham Light Inf. (West Hartlepool)
- Gnr. T. Pearson, Royal Field Arty. (Castleford)
- Pte. A. Peck, Lincolnshire Reg. (Spalding)
- Pte. H. B. Pellett, King's Royal Rifle Corps (Kent)
- Pte. T. Pendlebury, North Lancashire Reg. (Bolton)
- Pte. E. L. Pendrill, Machine Gun Corps (Limehouse)
- Cpl. J. Pennington, Lancashire Fusiliers (Manchester)
- Sgt. H. Peters, Border Reg. (Maryport)
- Cpl. F. Pethybridge, Royal Engineers (Torquay)
- Pte. S. G. Phillips, RAMC (Kingswinford)
- Pte. J. Picton, Lancashire Fusiliers (Rochdale)
- Cpl. H. S. Pilbro, Rifle Brigade (Paddington)
- Pte. W. Pinnigar, Machine Gun Corps (Bristol)
- Pte. J. Piper, Hampshire Reg. (Faversham)
- Gnr. T. H. Poland, Royal Field Arty. (Liverpool)
- Pte. J. Pope, Coldstream Guards, attd. Machine Gun Company (Rishton, Lancaster)
- Spr. E. Porter, Royal Engineers (Hackney, London)
- Spr. V. R. Porter, Royal Engineers (Queens Rd., London)
- Pte. E. R. Poston, King's Royal Rifle Corps (Walworth, London)
- Sgt. T. Povey, South Lancashire Reg. (St. Helens)
- L. Cpl. J. H. Power, Lancashire Fusiliers (Swinton)
- L. Cpl. P. Power, Cheshire Reg. (Stockport)
- Cpl. F. Pratt, Yeomanry (Derby)
- Pte. E. Prendergast, North Staffordshire Reg. (Burslem)
- Cpl. J. Prendergast, North Lancashire Reg. (Bolton)
- Pte. H. S. Preston, RAMC (Burnley)
- Pte. R. H. Pretty, Worcestershire Reg. (Redditch)
- L. Cpl. C. A. Price, South Wales Borderers (Swansea)
- L. Cpl. J. Price, Royal Engineers (Blackley)
- Pte. J. Price, Worcestershire Reg. (West Bromwich)
- Sgt. W. Price, Cheshire Reg. (Highley, near Bridgnorth)
- Pte. E. Pritchard, Royal Warwickshire Reg. (Ebbw Vale)
- Gnr. T. J. C. Pritty, Royal Field Arty. (Woodbridge)
- Pte. A. L. Pudney, Hampshire Reg. (Southend-on-Sea)
- Pte. J. Pugh, East Lancashire Reg. (Liverpool)
- L. Cpl. A. W. Quarterman, Rifle Brigade (Drumnadrackit)
- Cpl. A. Radcliffe, Worcestershire Reg. (Huncoat)
- Gnr. V. Radford, Royal Field Arty. (Bradford)
- L. Cpl. H. Rainford, Liverpool Reg. (Liverpool)
- Pte. C. Raley, Liverpool Reg. (Liverpool)
- Gnr. R. Ramsay, Royal Field Arty. (Dundee)
- Pte. F. G. Rand, Worcestershire Reg. (Kelshall)
- L. Cpl. L. Randie, King's Royal Rifle Corps (Bedworth)
- L. Cpl. V. Randies, Liverpool Reg. (Bootle)
- Pte. F. Ranger, King's Royal Rifle Corps (Londonr S.E.)
- Pte. E. S. Ranson, Royal Fusiliers (Oxford)
- Pte. W. Rayment, Nottinghamshire and Derbyshire Reg. (Buntingfbrd)
- Cpl. A. Read, King's Own Scottish Borderers (Manchester)
- Sgt. P. T. Read, RAMC (Bournemouth)
- Cpl. B. Reading, Royal Warwickshire Reg. (Southam, near Rugby)
- Pte. T. Reddington, Liverpool Reg. (Knock)
- Pte. W, A. Reed, Lancashire Fusiliers (Salford)
- Pte. J. Rees, King's Royal Rifle Corps (Llanelly)
- Sgt. J. E. Rees, Royal Garrison Arty. (Finedon)
- Pte. P. I. Rees, RAMC (Garnant)
- Cpl. H. Reid, Machine Gun Corps (Barrow)
- Pte. W. Reid, Lancashire Fusiliers (Newcastle upon Tyne)
- Cpl. A. Rendell, Royal Garrison Arty. (Dorchester)
- L. Cpl. J. Reynolds, Grenadier Guards (Liverpool)
- Cpl. T. Reynolds, South Lancashire Reg. (Leigh.)
- Sgt. W. T. Reynolds, Coldstream Guards (Stafford)
- Pte. A. Rhodes, King's Royal Rifle Corps (Eccles)
- Pte. J. Rhodes, Manchester Reg. (Ashton-under-Lyne)
- Cpl. W. B. Rice, Nottinghamshire and Derbyshire Reg. (Grimsby)
- Pte. J. Richards, York & Lancaster Reg. (Woolaston)
- Pte. W. Richardson, Lancashire Fusiliers (Salford)
- Pte. J. Richmond, North Lancashire Reg. (Preston)
- Pte. W. J. Ridgewell, Machine Gun Corps (Waldron)
- Cpl. C. J. Rigby, Royal Engineers (Chadwell Grays)
- Cpl. T. E. Rigby, Liverpool Reg. (Liverpool)
- Pte. S. W. Riggs, King's Royal Rifle Corps (Mitcham)
- Sgt. F. Rising, Royal Garrison Arty. (Malta)
- 2nd Cpl. A. E. Roadhouse, Royal Engineers (Sheffield)
- L. Sgt. J. E. Roake, East Surrey Reg. (Walworth)
- Pte. G. Robbins, King's Own Scottish Borderers (Castleford)
- Pte. J. Robbins, Essex Reg. (Poulton)
- L. Cpl. E. Roberts, Machine Gun Corps (Liverpool)
- Sgt. G. Roberts, Royal Fusiliers (Tottenham)
- L. Cpl. O. C. Roberts, Manchester Reg. (Cheetham Hall)
- Cpl. S. Roberts, Royal Field Arty. (Batley)
- Pte. H. Robertson, North Lancashire Reg. (Bolton)
- Pte. W. Robins, Lancashire Fusiliers (E. Poplar)
- Pte. C. Robinson, Lancashire Fusiliers (Pendleton)
- Pte. E. G. Robinson, East Lancashire Reg. (Barrow-in-Furness)
- Sgt. H. W. Robinson, Royal Fusiliers (Hull)
- L. Sgt. J. Robinson, North Lancashire Reg. (Preston)
- Sgt. A. G. Robson, Durham Light Inf. (Coldstream, County Durham)
- Pte. T. H. Rochelle, Cheshire Reg. (Stockport)
- Bombr. A. G. B. Rodger, Royal Field Arty. (Musselburgh)
- Cpl. J. Rogers, Royal Dublin Fusiliers (Drogheda)
- Pte. W. Roocroft, North Lancashire Reg. (Coppull, near Chorley)
- 2nd Class A. Mechanic J. W. Rookledge, Royal Flying Corps (Cape Town, South Africa)
- Sgt. F. Roscatier, South Lancashire Reg. (Widnes)
- Cpl. A. Routledge, Border Reg. (Patterdale)
- Sgt. B. Rough, Machine Gun Corps (Edinburgh)
- Pte. G. Rowbotham, Cheshire Reg. (Stockport)
- Pte. M. Rowe, Irish Guards (Coole)
- Pte. B. Rowell, Lancashire Fusiliers (Newcastle upon Tyne)
- Pte. W. Rowley, Grenadier Guards (Bacup, Lancaster)
- Pte. J. Ryder, Manchester Reg. (Manchester)
- Pte. E. Rylands, North Lancashire Reg. (Bolton)
- Sgt. B. Sadler, Royal Garrison Arty. (Yarmouth)
- Cpl. A. Salmon, Liverpool Reg. (Liverpool)
- Sgt. B. Sandham, Cheshire Reg. (Whitestakes, near Preston)
- L. Cpl. P. Sandiford, East Lancashire Reg. (Shaw)
- Pte. C. Sanson, King's Royal Rifle Corps (Hackney)
- L. Cpl. J. Santos, Liverpool Reg. (Liverpool)
- Act. Bombr. F. Saunders, Royal Garrison Arty. (St. Helens)
- L. Cpl. H. C. Saunders, Cambridgeshire Reg. (Cambridge)
- Pte. J. Saunders, Royal Dublin Fusiliers (Dublin)
- Pte. C. Schofield, Scots Guards (Bradford)
- Pte. G. Scott, Yorkshire Light Inf. (Somerset)
- Cpl. J. Scott, Royal Irish Fusiliers (Dublin)
- Sgt. C. G. Scrace, Royal Fusiliers (Penshurst)
- Pte. E. L. Scrase, Royal Munster Fusiliers (Burgess Hill)
- Pte. A. Scuffle, Hampshire Reg. (Blackwater)
- Pte. T. J. Seale, Royal Fusiliers (Brixton)
- Sgt. B. Seddon, Liverpool Reg. (Litherland)
- L. Sgt. F. Seddon, Liverpool Reg. (Southport)
- Pte. G. Seddon, Royal Dublin Fusiliers (Oldham)
- Pte. J. Sellers, East Yorkshire Reg. (Hull)
- Pte. E. Sergeant, King's Royal Rifle Corps (Birmingham)
- 2nd Cpl. A. E. Setterfield, Royal Engineers (Lower Tooting, London)
- Pte. J. Sewell, Royal West Surrey Reg. (Camberwell)
- Pte. F. N. Shaler, Royal Warwickshire Reg. (Hasbury, near Leamington Spa)
- Sgt. P. Shannon, Liverpool Reg. (Liverpool)
- Pte. P. Sharkey, Irish Guards (Sion Mills)
- Cpl. W. J. Sharp, Lancashire Fusiliers (Kirkby Lonsdale)
- Sgt. H. Sharpe, Border Reg. (Kendal)
- Pte. J. W. Sharpe, Lincolnshire Reg. (Grantham)
- L. Cpl. A. Shaw, Royal Scots (Jura)
- L. Cpl. A. F. Sheehan, Rifle Brigade (Hoxton, London)
- Spr. J. Sheehan, Royal Engineers (Marylebone)
- Cpl. D. Shenton, Manchester Reg. (Greenheys)
- L. Cpl. T. Sherlock, RAMC (Blackpool)
- Sgt. A. G. Shrubb, RAMC (Ipswich)
- Pte. S. Shufflebottom, East Lancashire Reg. (Manchester)
- L. Cpl. T. Shuker, North Staffordshire Reg. (Stoke-on-Trent)
- Pte. S. Shuttleworth, East Lancashire Reg. (Bolton)
- Pte. J. Sickel, Machine Gun Corps (Kensington)
- Sgt. J. Sillence, Hampshire Reg. (Southampton)
- Cpl. G. Sim, RAMC (Bridge of Allan)
- Sgt. W. Sim, Royal Engineers (Aberdeen)
- Pte. J. Simmonds, E. Brigade (London)
- Pte. F. Simmons, Army Service Corps (HaverstockHill)
- Pte. C. Simins, Royal Fusiliers (Oxford)
- Sgt. W. Simpson, Coldstream Guards (Sturton-by-Stow, Lincoln)
- Pte. T. Aingleton, RAMC (Carlisle)
- Sgt. B. Slack, Royal Field Arty. (Jarrow)
- Gnr. B. A. Daughter, Royal Garrison Arty. (Bickmansworth)
- L. Cpl. E. J. Smalley, Liverpool Reg., attd. Machine Gun Company (Cheetham)
- Pte. F. Smellie, East Lancashire Reg. (Padiham)
- Pte. J. Smillie, Royal Warwickshire Reg. (Fauldhouse)
- Pte. A. Smith, Royal Warwickshire Reg. (Coventry)
- Pte. A. B. Smith, Manchester Reg. (Colwyn Bay)
- Mechanic Staff Sergeant A. E. Smith, Royal Engineers (Buckland)
- Pte. B. A. Smith, Bedfordshire Reg. (Thorpe-le-Soken)
- Pte. H. Smith, Yorkshire Light Inf. (Jersey)
- L. Cpl. I. V. Smith, Liverpool Reg. (Liverpool)
- Pte. J. C. Smith, Royal Warwickshire Reg. (Blackridge)
- Pte. M. W. Smith, King's Royal Rifle Corps (Hertford)
- Pte. B. Smith, Liverpool Reg. (Manchester)
- Dvr. B. Smith, Royal Field Arty. (Bury St. Edmunds)
- Pte. B. H. Smith, Hampshire Reg. (West Ashling, near Chichester)
- L. Cpl. S. W. Smith, King's Royal Rifle Corps (West Hendon)
- Pte. T. Smith, Rifle Brigade (Norwich)
- L. Sgt. W. (Smith, King's Royal Rifle Corps (Durham)
- L. Cpl. W. Smith, Cambridgeshire Reg. (Whittlesey)
- Pte. W. H. Smith, Machine Gun Corps (Stoke-on-Trent)
- Sgt. W. T. Smith, Lancashire Fusiliers (Liverpool)
- L. Cpl. A. J. South, Nottinghamshire and Derbyshire Reg. (Carlton)
- Sgt. W. Sowerby, Border Reg. (Bishop Auckland)
- Pte. J. Spalding, Royal Highlanders (Forfar)
- Pte. B. Spanton, Duke of Cornwall's Light Inf. (Walthamstow)
- Cpl. F. J. Sparks, Machine Gun Corps (E. Nuneaton)
- Pte. J. Sparrow, Cambridgeshire Reg. (Christchurch)
- Gnr. H. T. Spence, Royal Garrison Arty. (Otley)
- Pte. J. Spoors, Durham Light Inf. (Felling)
- Gnr. A. F. Staite, Royal Field Arty. (Edgware Road, London)
- Sgt. J. Stapleton, Liverpool Reg. (Liverpool)
- Cpl. J. Stark, Labour Corps (Pauperhaugh)
- Pte. J. Stephen, RAMC (Mill of Auchintoul)
- Pte. J. Steward, King's Royal Rifle Corps (Ipswich)
- Sgt. A. Stewart, Machine Gun Corps (Arbroath)
- Pte. H. Stewart, Royal Scots (Kirriemuir)
- Cpl. J. Stewart, Yorkshire Light Inf. (Fife)
- C.Q.M.S. P. J. Stillwell, York & Lancaster Reg. (Nottingham)
- Dvr. V. J. Stockley, attd. Royal Field Arty. (Parkstone)
- Pte. P. C. Stokes, Royal Fusiliers (Enfield)
- L. Cpl. J. Stone, Oxfordshire & Buckinghamshire Light Inf. (Marlow)
- Sgt. J. Stott, Royal Engineers (Hartlepool)
- Cpl. A. Stout, Lancashire Fusiliers (Tyldesley)
- Gnr. A. Strachan, Royal Garrison Arty. (Forfar)
- L. Sgt. M. W. Stubbings, Hertfordshire Reg. (Bishops Stortford)
- Pte. F. E. Stubbs, Middlesex Reg. (Leyton)
- Pte. W. G. Stuart, Royal Highlanders (Partick)
- Pte. E. B. Stuckey, RAMC (Cardiff)
- Pte. S. W. Stuckey, RAMC (Cardiff)
- Pte. F. Styles, Rifle Brigade (Kensington)
- Pte. E. T. Such, Royal Berkshire Reg. (Birmingham)
- Cpl. T. A. Sullivan, Royal Field Arty. (Bow)
- Sgt. H. Summersgill, Lancashire Fusiliers (Bury)
- Cpl. W. Sutcliffe, Scots Guards (Stanley)
- Pte. S. Sutton, Royal Warwickshire Reg. (Atherstone)
- L. Cpl. A. Swain, King's Royal Rifle Corps (Paddington)
- Pte. J. Swallow, Lancashire Fusiliers (Accrington)
- Dvr. H. V. Swan, Army Service Corps (Maidstone)
- Pte. D. Sweeney, Irish Guards (Macroom)
- Cpl. G. Swift, South Staffordshire Reg. (St. Helens, Lancaster)
- Pte. J. W. Sykes, Manchester Reg. (Newton Heath)
- Pte. T. Syme, King's Own Scottish Borderers (Stewarton)
- Pte. G. Tait, Border Reg. (Felling-on-Tyne)
- Pte. F. T. Talbot, Royal Fusiliers (Chiswick)
- Gnr. G. E. Tarling, Royal Field Arty. (Mangotsfield)
- Pte. A. B.Tate, Royal Fusiliers (Prittlewell)
- Pte. E. Taylor, Machine Gun Corps (Chorley)
- L. Sgt. E. E. Taylor, Grenadier Guards (Cirencester)
- L. Cpl. G. A. Taylor, Worcestershire Reg. (Grimsby)
- Pte. H. Taylor, Lancashire Fusiliers (Badcliffe)
- Pte. J. Taylor, East Yorkshire Reg. (Hull)
- Gnr. J. Taylor, Royal Field Arty. (Manchester)
- Pte. T. Taylor, Machine Gun Corps (Spilsby)
- Dvr. W. Taylor, Royal Field Arty. (Walsall)
- Pte. W. Taylor, Machine Gun Corps (Congleton)
- Sgt. W. F. Taylor, Royal Berkshire Reg. (Bromley-by-Bow)
- Sgt. B. Teer, Nottinghamshire and Derbyshire Reg. (Nottingham)
- Sgt. M. Tempest, Border Reg. (Hetton-le-Hole)
- Pte. A. Terry, Liverpool Reg. (Bolton)
- Pte. T. J. Thistleton, North Lancashire Reg. (Longridge, near Preston)
- Cpl. J. Thompson, North Lancashire Reg. (Chorley)
- Dvr. A. Thomas, Royal Field Arty. (Kentish Town, London)
- Pte. J. Thomas, Lancashire Fusiliers (Salford)
- Cpl. J. W. Thomas, Lancashire Fusiliers (Abercarn)
- Sgt. A. Thompson, York & Lancaster Reg. (Co Chester)
- Pte. G. Thompson, East Kent Reg. (Earlsfield)
- Pte. H. Thompson, Liverpool Reg. (Liverpool)
- Sgt. H. G. Thompson, Rifle Brigade (East Greenwich)
- L. Cpl. I. L. Thompson, South Staffordshire Reg. (Birmingham)
- Sgt. S. Thompson, Royal Field Arty. (Greenock)
- Pte. B. Thornley, Nottinghamshire and Derbyshire Reg. (Buxton)
- Pte. W. Thornley, Manchester Reg. (Oldham)
- L. Cpl. H. Threlfall, Coldstream Guards (Bolton)
- L. Cpl. E. N. Thwaites, Royal Fusiliers (Southall)
- Sgt. J. Tickle, RAMC (Formby)
- Pte. C. Tilborn, Rifle Brigade (Peckham)
- Pte. J. Tindell, Rifle Brigade, attd. Machine Gun Company (East Dulwich)
- L. Sgt. S. W. Tomlin, Rifle Brigade (Holloway, London)
- Pte. J. Tomlinson, Machine Gun Corps (Castletor)
- Pte. J. W. Tomlinson, Coldstream Guards (Lincoln)
- Cpl. E. Tompkins, Hertfordshire Reg. (Hemel Hempstead)
- Pte. F. Toole, Lancashire Fusiliers (Bury)
- Pte. C. O. H. Todd, Manchester Reg. (Newcastle)
- L. Cpl. J. T. Topping, Lancashire Fusiliers (Middleton)
- Sgt. F. Townrow, Lincolnshire Reg. (Shirebrook)
- Sgt. L. Townsend, Royal Field Arty. (Liverpool)
- Pte. E. Travis, London Reg. (Stockwell)
- L. Cpl. H. Trevor, Lancashire Fusiliers (Seedley)
- Pte. P. Tuffy, Irish Guards (Castlebar)
- Cpl. G. Turnbull, Machine Gun Corps (Northumberland)
- Cpl. R. Turnbull, Royal Engineers (E. Greenock)
- Pte. A. Turner, RAMC (Bristol)
- Pnr. E. Turner, Royal Engineers (Westwood)
- Pte. A. G. Turner, Lincolnshire Reg. (Hartlepool)
- Pte. F. C. Turner, Hampshire Reg. (Odiham)
- Sgt. J. Turner, Highland Light Inf. (Newmains)
- Cpl. J. F. Turner, Royal Sussex Reg. (Woking)
- Pte. M. Turner, Lancashire Fusiliers (Swalwell)
- Pte. H. R. Twiss, Manchester Reg. (Sandbach)
- Sgt. L. Tyler, Royal Warwickshire Reg. (Birmingham)
- Pte. R. Tyrer, North Lancashire Reg. (Bolton)
- Cpl. W. F. Ungless, Machine Gun Corps (Ipswich)
- Pte. P. Uphill, Lancashire Fusiliers (Balham)
- Pte. W. G. Uren, Welsh Reg. (Port Talbot)
- Sgt. G. Veitch, Machine Gun Corps (Edinburgh)
- Pte. J. B. Venables, Lancashire Fusiliers (Peckham)
- L. Cpl. J. Veney, Liverpool Reg. (Bootle)
- Pte. S. E. Venn, Grenadier Guards (E. Boston, Lincolnshire)
- Sgt. E. Verdin, Royal Scots (E. London)
- Cpl. H. Vickers, Manchester Reg. (Chorlton-cum-Hardy)
- Pte. T. Virgo, Lancashire Fusiliers (Atherton)
- Pte. J. J. Waite, Royal Warwickshire Reg. (Coventry)
- L. Cpl. C. E. Waldron, Worcestershire Reg. (Wildmoor)
- Sgt. A. F. A. Walker, Machine Gun Corps (Herne Hill)
- Sgt. B. Walker, Nottinghamshire and Derbyshire Reg. (Matlock)
- Pte. C. E. Walker, Worcestershire Reg. (Rochdale)
- Cpl. H. Walker, Somerset Light Inf. (Derby)
- Pte. J. Walker, Worcestershire Reg. (Hindley)
- Sgt. R. Walker, Scottish Rifles (Cowdenbeath)
- Gnr. J. R. Wallace, Royal Field Arty. (Armadale)
- Pte. J. R. Wallace, Welsh Guards (Blaenmondda, Glamorgan)
- Pte. W. Wallace, Scots Guards (Glasgow)
- Pte. H. Walmsley, Liverpool Reg., attd. Machine Gun Company (Southport)
- Cpl. D. Walsh, Liverpool Reg. (Southport)
- Pte. P. Walsh, Yorkshire Light Inf. (Bradford)
- Sgt. B. Walton, Royal Engineers (Todmorden)
- Pte. H. Walwyn, Manchester Reg. (Ystalyfera)
- Pte. F. Warburton, Yorkshire Light Inf. (Sheffield)
- Gnr. H. Warren, Royal Field Arty. (Hans Place, London)
- L. Cpl. T. Warren, Royal Welsh Fusiliers (Leigh)
- Pte. G. Warrington, Nottinghamshire and Derbyshire Reg. (Ashbourne)
- Sgt. A. H. Waters, Machine Gun Corps (Southport)
- Pte. R. Watkinson, Liverpool Reg. (Southport)
- L. Cpl. S. C. Watler, Rifle Brigade (Harpenden)
- L. Cpl. C. Watson, Hertfordshire Reg. (Northampton)
- Cpl. C. F. Watson, Cambridgeshire Reg. (Cambridge)
- Dvr. F. Watson, Royal Field Arty. (Burton-on-Trent)
- L. Cpl. G. Watson, Royal Highlanders (Arbroath)
- Sgt. J. Watson, Durham Light Inf. (Annfield Plain)
- Sgt. J. Watson, Lincolnshire Reg. (Sheffield)
- Act. Sgt. M. Watson, Liverpool Reg. (Liverpool)
- Pte. R. H. Watson, RAMC (Cambridge)
- Petty Ofc. T. Watson, Royal Naval Volunteer Reserve (Smalwell)
- Pte. M. Watt, King's Own Scottish Borderers (Dumfries)
- Sgt. W. Way, Devonshire Reg. (Tiverton)
- Pte. G. A. Webb, Liverpool Reg. (Liverpool)
- Spr. P. Webb, Royal Engineers (Cambridge)
- Pte. H. Webster, Scots Guards (Methley, near Leeds)
- Pte. W. Welsby, East Lancashire Reg. (Bolton)
- Pte. C. Went, Scots Guards (Hereford)
- Cpl. A. Werrill, Royal Field Arty. (Wigan)
- Sgt. A. West, Royal Field Arty. (Bath)
- Pte. F. Wheeldin, North Lancashire Reg. (Hindley)
- Spr. A. E. G. Wheeler, Royal Engineers (Quidhampton)
- Sgt. W. C. Wheller, Royal Engineers (Manorbier, Pern.)
- Bombr. E. Whitaker, Royal Field Arty. (Thornhill)
- Pte. G. H. White, Royal Highlanders (Maybole, Ayrshire)
- Pte. L. White, Manchester Reg. (Manchester)
- L. Cpl. E. Whitmarsh, Middlesex Reg. (Tottenham)
- Sgt. W. T. Whiteside, Royal Lancaster Reg. (Ulverston)
- L. Cpl. C. Whittaker, Manchester Reg. (Blackley)
- Pte. W. Whittaker, Manchester Reg. (Oldham)
- L. Cpl. J. T. Wickens, Military Foot Police (West Norwood)
- L. Cpl. G. Widdows, Liverpool Reg. (Liverpool)
- Sgt. A. Wiggett, Nottinghamshire and Derbyshire Reg. (Hucknall)
- L. Cpl. J. Wilcox, Liverpool Reg. (Liverpool)
- Cpl. F. Wild, Coldstream Guards (Hoibeck, Leeds)
- Pte. J. T. Wild, Royal Lancaster Reg. (Oldham)
- Pte. A. J. Williams, Rifle Brigade (Peckham)
- Pte. G. Williams, Liverpool Reg. (Southport)
- Sgt. H. S. Williams, Grenadier Guards (Camberwell, S.B.)
- Act. Sgt. J. Williams, South Lancashire Reg. (Widnes)
- Cpl. J. Williams, Welsh Reg. (Llandderfel, Bala)
- Pte. W. R. Williams, Army Service Corps (Birkenhead)
- Pte. P. Willows, Cambridgeshire Reg. (Cambridge)
- Pte. J. Wilmot, Rifle Brigade (Holloway)
- Pte. E. C. C. Wilson, Liverpool Reg. (Lowestoft)
- Sgt. G. Wilson, Liverpool Reg. (Liverpool)
- Pte. J. Wilson, Machine Gun Corps (Edinburgh)
- Cpl. W. Wilson, Royal Engineers (Manchester)
- Spr. H. Wimpory, Royal Engineers (Islington)
- Pte. R. Wing, Cambridgeshire Reg. (Coates, Whittlesey)
- Dvr. J. Winson, Royal Field Arty. (Kirk Ireton)
- Gnr. A. Wood, Tank Corps (Berkhamstead)
- L. Cpl. H. Wood, Royal Lancaster Reg. (Enfield)
- Sgt. R. M. Wood, Royal Warwickshire Reg. (Witton, Birmingham)
- Sgt. T. McD. Wood, Scots Guards (Greenock)
- Pte. F. Woodhead, Cheshire Reg. (Glossop)
- Cpl. G. Woodhouse, Nottinghamshire and Derbyshire Reg. Heanor)
- Pte. J. T. Woodruff, Durham Light Inf. (Ferryhill)
- Pte. J. Woodward, Nottinghamshire and Derbyshire Reg., attd. Machine Gun Company (Sandiacre)
- Pte. S. Woodward, Liverpool Reg. (Liverpool)
- Sgt. W. Worker, South Staffordshire Reg. (Walsall)
- Pte. J. T. Worsley, Lancashire Fusiliers (Bury)
- L. Cpl. J. Wright, Liverpool Reg. (Southport)
- Sgt. J. H. D. Wright, Derby Yeomanry (Ashbourne)
- L. Sgt. T. Wright, Royal Lancaster Reg. (Preston)
- Sgt. V. C. Wright, Lancashire Fusiliers (Bury)
- L. Cpl. W. Wright, Bedfordshire Reg. (Horncastle)
- Spr. W. Wright, Royal Engineers (Elton, near Stockton)
- Pte. A. J. Wyatt, Coldstream Guards (Sharpies, near Bolton)
- Pte. P. Wyre, North Lancashire Reg. (Bolton)
- Sgt. J. Yates, Liverpool Reg. (Farmby)
- Pte. S. Yates, Lancashire Fusiliers (St. Helens)
- Pte. W. Yates, Royal Lancaster Reg. (Wieran)
- Pte. W. Yates, North Lancashire Reg. (Leyland)
- Pte. J. W. Young, Machine Gun Corps (Romford)
- Sgt. R. Younge, Leinster Reg. (Rosenallis)

For coolness and gallantry displayed in the performance of their duties when a casualty clearing station was heavily shelled —

- Sister Mary Gladys Connie Foley RRC Queen Alexandra's Imperial Military Nursing Service
- Sister Mabel Jennings ARRC Territorial Force Nursing Service

Australian Imperial Force

- Sgt. A. T. S. Adams, Light Horse Reg.
- Spr. W. J. F. Adams, Engineers
- Sgt. D. H. Allan, Inf.
- Pte. E. E. Anderson, Inf.
- Tmp Sergeant S. Anderson, Inf.
- Pte. T. Anderson, Inf.
- Dvr. L. C. Annear, Field Arty.
- Pte. V. M. Arandale, Inf.
- L. Cpl. C. P. Archer, Inf.
- Pte. F. B. Archer, Inf.
- Pte. H. M. Armstrong, Inf.
- Dvr. W. J. C. Arnott, Field Arty.
- Sgt. T. J. Ashley, Army Service Corps
- Pte. E. D. Ashton, Inf.
- Sgt. E. B. Astbury, Pioneer Battalion
- Pte. G. Aston, Inf.
- Dvr. A.E. Attrill, Army Service Corps
- M.T. Driver B. O. Austin, Army Service Corps
- Pte. P. C. Avery, Inf.
- Cpl. A. E. Ayers, Inf.
- Sgt. F. J. Bailey, Pioneer Battalion
- Cpl. W. Bailey, Field Arty.
- Gnr. C. A. Baker, Field Arty.
- Cpl. C. T. Baldock, Trench Mortar Battery
- Gnr. C. Baldwin, Field Arty.
- Gnr. N. Bannon, Field Arty.
- Gnr. F. T. Barker, Field Arty.
- Gnr. S. B. Barker, Field Arty.
- L. Cpl. A. E. Barnes, Inf.
- Gnr. F. S. Barton, Field Arty.
- Pte. L. V. Barwick, Inf.
- Sgt. E. S. Beard, Inf.
- Cpl. J. P. Beaver, A.S.C
- Dvr. W. H. Beever, Field Arty.
- M.T. Driver H. J. Beith, Army Service Corps
- Sgt. C. W. Beli, Inf.
- Cpl. I. L. Bell, Inf.
- Sgt. T. I. Birch, Inf.
- L. Cpl. E. R. Blackadder, Inf.
- Pte. W. Blezard, Inf.
- Pte. C. J. Bond, Army Medical Corps
- Pte. E. W. Bourke, Inf.
- Sgt. H. E. Bradbury, Machine Gun Corps
- Pte. J. T. Bradley, Army Medical Corps
- Onr. H. C. Brisbane, Field Arty.
- Act. Sgt. V. J. Brogan, Field Arty.
- 2nd Cpl. J. P. Brown, Engineers
- Pte. J. W. Brown, Inf.
- Cpl. P. Brown, Inf.
- Dvr. J. Brownlees, Field Arty.
- Dvr. E. J. Bruce, Field Arty.
- Pte. C. H. Buchanan, Machine Gun Corps
- Sgt. R. Buchanan, Field Arty.
- Cpl. A. H. Buckley, Army Service Corps
- Pte. A. W. Burgoyne, Inf.
- Sgt. J. Burke, Inf.
- Pte. W. E. Burke, Inf.
- Cpl. W. J. Burkett-Vipont, Light Horse Reg.
- Tpr. J. F. Burley, Light Horse Reg.
- Cpl. F. D. Burrell, Engineers
- Cpl. A. A. Butcher, Army Service Corps
- L. Sgt. P. C. Callahan, Inf.
- Sgt. G. N. Cameron, Pioneer Battalion
- Pte. J. J. Cameron, Inf.
- Pte. M. B. Cameron, Inf.
- Tmp Cpl. G. Campbell, Inf.
- Cpl. L. R. Carr, Pioneer Battalion
- Sgt. M. Carr, Light Horse Reg.
- L. Cpl. W. H. Carr, Machine Gun Corps
- Pte. F. B. Carrodus, Pioneer Battalion
- Pte. W. J. Carroll, Army Medical Corps
- Gnr. J. H. Carthew, Field Arty.
- Dvr. G. J. Cavanagh, Field Arty.
- Tmp Cpl. M. W. Cawston, Pioneer Battalion
- Sgt. E. C. Cay, Australian Engineers
- Sgt. G. A. Charlesworth, Inf.
- Sgt. T. Charlton, Pioneer Battalion
- Act. 2nd Cpl. C. Cheetham, Engineers
- Sgt. E. C. Chenney, Field Arty.
- Cpl. V. Chilcott, Light Horse Reg.
- Gnr. H. Chippindall, Field Arty.
- Cpl. A. W. Cima, Inf.
- Staff Sergeant B. J. Clark, Army Medical Corps
- Gnr. V. K. Clark, Field Arty.
- Cpl. J. H. Clarke, Inf.
- Pte. T. C. Cleary, Inf.
  - Far. Sergeant A. C. Cocks, Field Arty.
- Sgt. W. Coleman, Inf.
- Pte. S. Collins, Pioneer Battalion
- Tpr. A. E. Cook, Light Horse Reg.
- Dvr. O. E. Cook, Army Medical Corps
- Pte. P. G. Coppock, Inf.
- Pte. G. H. Cornwell, Army Medical Corps
- L. Cpl. L. C. Cotterill, Inf.
- Dvr. H. A. Goveny, Field Arty.
- Pte. G. H. Craven, Inf.
- Pte. P. J. Critchley, Inf.
- Tpr. S. J. Cross, Light Horse Reg.
  - Far. Cpl. P. W. Cunynghame, Army Service Corps
- Cpl. O. Daley, Army Medical Corps
- Dvr. T. Dalgleish, Field Arty.
- Pte. J. R. Dalton, Pioneer Battalion
- Sgt. G. E. T. Darbyshire, Engineers
- Dvr. F. H. Davis, Field Arty.
- Pte. G. Dawson, Machine Gun Corps
- Pte. R. E. G. Denham, Inf.
- Gnr. W. Densley, Field Arty.
- Sgt. J. Devine, Pioneer Battalion
- Sgt. T. W. Dial, Inf.
- Dvr. J. Diggles, Field Arty.
- Pte. J. J. Dobbins, Army Medical Corps
- L. Cpl. W. Donnelly, Inf.
- Tpr. V. Donovan, Light Horse Reg.
- Pte. A. J. Dougherty, Inf.
- Pte. D. Dowd, Inf.
- Sgt. J. W. Dowley, Light Horse Reg.
- Tpr. E. Dowling, Light Horse Reg.
- Pte. J. P. Drake, Army Medical Corps
- Tpr. C. E. M. Duff, Light Horse Reg.
- Sgt. G. A. Easey, Inf.
- Gnr. S. Ebsary, Field Arty.
- Pte. L. Edwards, Army Medical Corps
- Cpl. H. Ellioott, Inf.
- Pte. C. F. Ellingsen, Army Medical Corps
- Act. Cpl. F. Elworthy, Field Arty.
- Dvr. E. L. Evans, Machine Gun Corps
- Sgt. J. A. Evans, Inf.
- Sgt. W. F. Evans, Inf.
- Dvr. R. F. Fairclough, Field Arty.
- Sgt. G. Fawcett, Field Arty.
- Pte. F. Feder, Inf.
- L. Cpl. D. Fenner, Army Medical Corps
- Dvr. H. G. Ferranti, Army Service Corps
- Dvr. Royal Arty. Fisher, Field Arty.
- L. Cpl. J. A. Fly, Inf.
- Pte. S. J. Folkes, Inf.
- Dvr. A. Ford, Field Arty.
- Dvr. E. E. Fowle, Field Arty.
- Tmp Cpl. D. C. Frankcombe, Inf.
- Pte. F. Franklin, Inf.
- Sgt. H. J. Fraser, Inf.
- Gnr. J. J. Fraser, Trench Mortar Battery
- Sgt. H. J. Frazer, Inf.
- Pte. J. I. Freeman, Army Medical Corps
- Dvr. W. V. French, Army Service Corps
- Gnr. C. E. Freshney, Field Arty.
- Dvr. A. H. Furnies, Engineers
- Bombr. W. V. Gayer, Field Arty.
- Cpl. G. J. Gillam, Garrison Arty.
- Cpl. W. M. Glenister, Field Arty.
- Sgt. W. H. Glossop, Inf.
- Pte. F. Godden, Inf.
- Sgt. R. J. Goodliffe, Field Arty.
- Dvr. H. E. St. J. Gough, Army Medical Corps
- Tpr. T. Graham, Light Horse Reg.
- L. Cpl. A. H. Gray, Inf.
- Sgt. V. A. Goodwin, Field Arty.
- Pte. A. R. Green, Army Medical Corps
- Dvr. J. A. Greenbank, Army Service Corps
- Sgt. R. C. Gregory, Machine Gun Corps
- Pte. R. W. Grey, Army Medical Corps
- Spr. R. Grieve, Engineers
- Cpl. C. F. Grimble, Inf.
- Tpr. W. E. Grimshaw, Machine Gun Corps
- Spr. J. Grinham, Engineers
- Pte. D. Gunn, Inf.
- Spr. W. A. Haden, Engineers
- Pte. W. Hall, Inf.
- Cpl. W. J. Halliday, Inf.
- L. Cpl. P. E. Hambly, Inf.
- Sgt. R. Hamilton, Light Horse Reg.
- Dvr. H. W. Hammond, Army Service Corps
- Pte. H. A. Hampson, Army Medical Corps
- Sgt. H. Hannaford, Pioneer Battalion
- L. Cpl. M. Harrison, Inf.
- Pte. G. G. Hart, Inf.
- Pte. M. J. Harvey, Inf.
- Dvr. C. E. Hawkins, Field Arty.
- L. Cpl. H. W. Hawkins, Army Medical Corps
- Cpl. H. R. Haxby, Inf.
- Dvr. C. R. Hayek, Engineers
- Cpl. E. Hayes, Army Medical Corps
- Gnr. E. J. Hayward, Field Arty.
- Tpr. A. E. Healey, Light Horse Reg.
- Pte. F. Healey, Inf.
- Pte. H. F. Heinrich, Inf.
- Pte. W. A. Heintz, Inf.
- Pte. S. Hendry, Inf.
- Sgt. A. D. Herd, Inf.
- Pte. C. N. Hethorn, Pioneer Battalion
- Gnr. H. Hickson, Trench Mortar Battery
- Sgt. H. T. Hilder, Inf.
- Spr. G. R. Hill, Engineers
- Pte. W. J. Hodge, Inf.
- Tpr. T. R. Hogarth, Light Horse Reg.
- L. Cpl. W. Holden, Inf.
- Dvr. T. W. Holland, Field Arty.
- Pte. A. Hollingworth, Inf.
- Dvr. T. Hollingworth, Field Arty.
- Spr. S. H. E. Hollow, Engineers
- Sgt. H. B. Holloway, Inf.
- Dvr. E. H. Holmes, Field Arty.
- Gnr. G. Holmes, Field Arty.
- Pte. J. Holt, Inf.
- Sgt. S. Hope, Inf.
- Sgt. H. Hopper, Engineers
- Pte. M. J. A. Houston, Inf.
- Sgt. C. B. Hughes, Inf.
- Sgt. W. J. Hume, Inf.
- Gnr. T. S. W. Hurley, Field Arty.
- Tpr. E. Hyland, Light Horse Reg.
- Pte. R. A. Irwin, Inf.
- Sgt. W. Jackson, Inf.
- Dvr. W. Jackson, Field Arty.
- Pte. C. James, Inf.
- Pte. C. G. James, Inf.
- Sgt. R. S. James, Light Horse Reg.
- Pte. S. James, Inf.
- Pte. H. L. Jenkins, Inf.
- Sgt. L. Johns, Army Medical Corps
- Dvr. H. Jones, Field Arty.
- Dvr. W. Jones, Field Arty.
- Dvr. H. Kane, Inf.
- L. Cpl. A. G. Keane, Machine Gun Corps
- Tpr. C. E. Kelleher, Light Horse Reg.
- L. Cpl. J. J. Kelly, Light Horse Reg.
- Pte. W. Kelty, Inf.
- Pte. A. Kemp, Inf.
- Pte. H. C. Kershaw, Army Medical Corps
- L. Sgt. H. G. Kershaw, Machine Gun Corps
- Sgt. E. S. Key, Inf.
- Gnr. G. Kibblewhite, Field Arty.
- Cpl. J. S. Kidd, Engineers
- L. Cpl. H. Killalea, Light Horse Reg.
- Pte. J. A. W. Killen, Inf.
- Dvr. J. E. Kilpatrick, Army Service Corps
- Pte. J. King, Inf.
- Sgt. J. H. S. King, Inf.
- Pte. L. W. King, Army Medical Corps
- Dvr. B. C. King, Field Arty.
- Cpl. J. F. Kittson, Inf.
- Pte. M. I. Knudsen, Inf.
- L. Cpl. H. G. Lamb, Inf.
- L. Cpl. K. D. Lane, Army Medical Corps
- Pte. W. Langdon, Inf.
- L. Cpl. J. R. Lawless, Inf.
- Pte. E. C. Lawrance, Inf.
- Dvr. S. J. Leonard, Army Medical Corps
- Dvr. A. Leslie, Field Arty.
- Bombr. O. H. Lightbody, Field Arty.
- Pte. A Little, Salvage Corps
- L. Cpl. G. W. Lloyd, Army Medical Corps
- Pte. W. J. Lobsey, Inf.
- L. Cpl. R. Loder, Machine Gun Corps
- Pte. A. H. Longworth, Army Medical Corps
- Pte. L. C. Ludbrooke, Army Medical Corps
- L. Cpl. A. C. Macadam, Army Service Corps
- Act. Cpl. J. J. Mace, Engineers
- Dvr. G. R. Malinson, Field Arty.
- Cpl. T. T. Manning, Army Service Corps
- Pte. G. A. Manton, Inf.
- Pte. T. E. Mappin, Army Medical Corps
- Dvr. H. W. Marshall, Army Medical Corps
- Sgt. G. H. Martin, Inf.
- Pte. J. Matheson, Inf.
- Spr. W. J. Mawby, Engineers
- Pte. F. P. May, Army Medical Corps
- L. Sgt. R. C. May, Inf.
- Dvr. J. McCarthy, Army Medical Corps
- Pte. C. V. McDonald, Pioneer Battalion
- Tmp 2nd Cpl. E. M. McDonald, Engineers
- Tmp Cpl. F. McDonald, Inf.
- Sgt. J. McDonald, Inf.
- Pte. W. McDonald, Inf.
- Cpl. W. J. McDonald, Engineers
- Sgt. S. McGarth, Inf.
- Sgt. M. McGrath, Inf.
- Dvr. G. G. McKay, Field Arty.
- Gnr. M. McKenzie, Field Arty.
- Cpl. T. B. McKeone, Engineers
- Gnr. L. McKinney, Field Arty.
- Pte. O. W. McKinnon, Inf.
- Spr. S. H. McNamara, Engineers
- Gnr. A. L. McPherson, Field Arty.
- Pte. A. McWatters, Inf.
- Bombr. C. H. Meek, Field Arty.
- Bombr. A. Mehan, Field Arty.
- Pte. E. J. Mellish, Inf.
- Cpl. J. V. Meredith, Inf.
- Sgt. B. F. Mitchell, Pioneer Battalion
- Pte. W. J. Moore, Army Medical Corps
- Pte. C. Moran, Inf.
- Dvr. A. Morrow, Field Arty.
- L. Cpl. F. R. Morrow, Inf.
- L. Cpl. W. C. Mortimer, Inf.
- Dvr. F. B. Mountoastle, Field Arty.
- Pte. J. A. Murray, Army Medical Corps
- Dvr. H. Nancarrow, Engineers
- Gnr. C. W. Nevill, Field Arty.
- Pte. W. J. L. Newell, Inf.
- Pte. C. H. Newey, Inf.
- Dvr. C. L. Newitt, Field Arty.
- Pte. G. H. Newman, Inf.
- Sgt. H. Norman, Machine Gun Corps
- Pte. R. M. Norman, Inf.
- L. Cpl. W. O'Brien, Inf.
- Dvr. J. O'Connor, Army Service Corps
- Tpr. J. W. Offord, Light Horse Reg.
- Pte. W. O'Hearn, Inf.
- Tpr. T. O'Leary, Light Horse Reg.
- Cpl. A. A. Olin, Inf.
- Cpl. G. B. Oliver, Field Arty.
- Pte. C. H. Oram, Inf.
- L. Cpl. R. V. I. Ormsby, Army Medical Corps
- Dvr. A. Page, Field Arty.
- Spr. P. P. Page, Engrs
- Cpl. E. A. Pagels, Inf.
- Pte. H. L. Parman, Inf.
- L. Cpl. A. E. Parrish, Inf.
- Cpl. K. G. Patterson, Inf.
- Pte. K. F. Paulin, Inf.
- Pte. G. Peacock, Inf.
- Pte. J. Pebblewick, Inf.
- Pte. J. Peel, Inf.
- L. Cpl. R. Perkins, Inf.
- Cpl. V. Peterson, Engineers
- Cpl. F. J. S. Pettersson, Engineers
- Pte. F. J. Philip, Inf.
- Sgt. C. H. Phillips, Inf.
- Cpl. E. B. Picton, Light Horse Reg.
- Pte. H. V. Pike, Inf.
- L. Cpl. J. T. Pinchen, Inf.
- Pte. J. R. Pollock, Inf.
- Dvr. F. E. Pope, Field Arty.
- Dvr. J. G. Pope, Inf.
- L. Cpl. T. A. Potter, Inf.
- Sgt. W. R. Powell, Inf.
- Dvr. R. G. Preece, Engineers
- Pte. J. P. Prendergast, Inf.
- Pte. A. Prescott, Inf.
- L. Cpl. T. J. Price, Army Medical Corps
- Cpl. W. G. F. Pritchard, Machine Gun Corps
- L. Cpl. A. E. Puyett, Inf.
- Gnr. H. C. Quinsey, Field Arty.
- Dvr. C. R. Radnell, Field Arty.
- L. Cpl. A. Raff, Inf.
- Pte. D. E. Rees, Army Medical Corps
- Sgt. H. G. Richmond, Inf.
- Dvr. W. A. Rigney, Field Arty.
- Sgt. R. H. Ringrose, Pioneer Battalion
- Pte. J. Ritchie, Army Medical Corps
- Pte. J. B. Roach, Inf.
- Pte. J. T. Roberta, Army Medical Corps
- Dvr. J. V. A. Robertson, Field Arty.
- Dvr. C.F. Robinson, Field Arty.
- Pte. J. Robinson, Inf.
- Act. Sgt. R. R. Robinson, Pioneer Battalion
- Pte. W. B. M. Robinson, Inf.
- Pte. L. Rogers, Inf.
- Pte. E. V. Rosenberg, Inf.
- Sgt. C. W. Rosendell, Inf.
- Gnr. M. Ross, Field Arty.
- Spr. R. K. Rule, Engineers
- Spr. J. R. Russell, Engineers
- Pte. J. R. Russell, Pioneer Battalion
- Sgt. W. Salmon, Light Horse Reg.
- Act. Sgt. G. L. Salthouse, Pioneer Battalion
- L. Cpl. A. Sandford, Pioneer Battalion
- Dvr. L. F. Sandwell, Army Service Corps
- Gnr. R. J. Savage, Field Arty.
- Cpl. A. H. Scott, Field Arty.
- Tpr. W. Scott, Light Horse Reg.
- Gnr. J. Seabrook, Field Arty.
- Spr. C. E. Seccombe, Engineers
- Cpl. F. M. Sellick, Field Arty.
- Bombr. W. G. Selway, Field Arty.
- Cpl. S. H. Selwyn, Army Medical Corps
- Pte. H. L. Sercombe, Army Medical Corps
- Pte. D. L. Sharry, Army Medical Corps
- Gnr. E. J. Sherriff, Field Arty.
- Cpl. W. Sim, Inf.
- Pte. W. H. Simpkins, Inf.
- Dvr. A. D. Simpson, Inf.
- Pte. R. Simpson, Army Medical Corps
- Sgt. J. F. Sims, Engineers
- Pte. B. J. Skilton, Inf.
- L. Cpl. W. A. Skone, Engineers
- Dvr. H. Smith, Field Arty.
- Pte. I. L. Smith, Inf.
- Sgt. J. A. Smith, Inf.
- Dvr. J. W. Smith, Field Arty.
- Sgt. S. A. Smith, Inf.
- Cpl. V. G. Smith, Inf.
- Cpl. J. Snowie, Inf.
- Pte. J. Somerville, Inf.
- Tpr. A. C. South, Machine Gun Corps
- Act. Sgt. H. I. Spencer, Inf.
- L. Cpl. H. Spiker, Army Service Corps
- Pte. F. B. Stark, Inf.
- Pte. C. J. R. Steel, Inf.
- L. Sgt. E. H. C. Steel, Army Service Corps
- Cpl. A. Stenhouse, Field Arty.
- L. Sgt. V. C. Stevenson, Inf.
- Spr. A. E. Stocqueler, Engineers
- M.T. Driver J. Stoddart, Army Service Corps
- Pte. E. E. Stolz, Army Medical Corps
- Gnr. C. Stevens, Field Arty.
- Pte. R. J. Stutz, Inf.
- Cpl. F. Sliding, Army Medical Corps
- Dvr. J. Suhan, Inf.
- Bombr. W. H. Sutherland, Trench Mortar Battery, now Field Arty.
- Pte. C. Sutton, Inf.
- Pte. O. H. Swanson, Army Medical Corps
- L. Cpl. J. G. Tarrant, Army Service Corps
- Pte. J. S. Taylor, Inf.
- L. Cpl. W. G. Teague, Army Medical Corps
- Pte. C. Thomson, Inf.
- Pte. J. Thomson, Inf.
- L. Cpl. W. G. Toft, Engineers
- Pte. J. Tognolini, Inf.
- Pte. F. C. Tormay, Inf.
- Cpl. H. J. Townsend, Inf.
- Dvr. C. H. Turgoose, Army Service Corps
- Dvr. G. Turton, A.S C
- L. Cpl. B. W. Van Dyk, Inf.
- Gnr. F. M. Veness, Field Arty.
- Act. Bombr. G. K. Verco, Field Arty.
- Tpr. G. Volp, Light Horse Reg.
- L. Cpl. W. E. J. Wade, Pioneer Battalion
- Tpr. J. Wade, Machine Gun Corps
- Pte. W. P. Wade, Army Medical Corps
- Cpl. H. F. Walker, Field Arty.
- Cpl. W. Walker, Inf.
- Cpl. G. Walters, Inf.
- Act. Bombr. F. Warren, Field Arty.
- Pte. J. H. Ward, Inf.
- Pte. A. W. Watson, Inf.
- Sgt. B. L. Watson, Inf.
- Cpl. A. Webber, Inf.
- Pte. G. Weiley, Inf.
- Pte. A. Wellstead, Inf.
- Tpr. W. West, Light Horse Reg.
- Pte. A. E. Weston, Inf.
- Sgt. A. E. Weymouth, Army Medical Corps
- Dvr. H. Whelan, Army Service Corps
- Spr. A. F. White, Engineers
- Sgt. C. F. Whittle, Machine Gun Corps, late Dorsetshire Reg. (East Knighton)
- Pte. H. Wilkes, Inf.
- Pte. H. W. H. Williams, Army Medical Corps
- Sgt. R. C. Williams, Pioneer Battalion
- Spr. W. T. G. Williames, Engineers
- Sgt. A. G. Wilson, Light Horse Reg.
- Gnr. L. G. Wilson, Field Arty.
- Bombr. T. J. Wilson, Garrison Arty.
- Cpl. E. F. H. Wilton, Trench Mortar Battery
- Pte. H. D. E. Withers, Inf.
- Pte. F. J. T. Woods, Inf.
- Gnr. G. B. Woods, Trench Mortar Battery, now Field Arty.
- Pte. G. E. Wort, Army Medical Corps
- Pte. C. E. Yates, Inf.
- Pte. H. D. Young, Inf.
- Gnr. A. J. Younger, Trench Mortar Battery
- Sgt. E. H. Zelman, Inf.
- Gnr. T. G. Abigail, Field Arty.
- Pte. R. J. Adam, Inf.
- L. Cpl. D. Adams, Inf.
- Sgt. G. M. Adams, Inf.
- Dvr. H. Adcock, Inf.
- Bombr. J. S. Allah, Field Arty.
- Pte. E. J. Allen, Inf.
- Pte. A. W. Aldridge, Inf.
- Pte. L. R. Arnheim, Army Medical Corps
- Pte. N. H. Atkins, Inf.
- Gnr. G. A. P. Atkinson, Field Arty.
- Pte. A. Attick, Inf.
- Dvr. W. J. Anderson, Army Medical Corps
- Sgt. H. W. Austin, Engineers
- Spr. J. Ayres, Engineers
- Sgt. T. D. Baker, Field Arty.
- Sgt. L. L. Barnes, Machine Gun Corps
- Pte. W. H. Barnes, Army Medical Corps
- Cpl. G. P. Barr, Inf.
- L. Sgt. H. Barr, Inf.
- Cpl. W. Bates, Inf.
- Pte. R. R. Bell, Inf.
- Pte. A. S. Bergmeir, Inf.
- Pte. M. Beverly, Inf.
- Pte. W. E. Beves, Inf.
- Pte. E. Birch, Inf.
- Pte. G. C. Black, Inf.
- Dvr. R. W. Boardman, Inf.
- Cpl. G. C. Bonython, Inf.
- Cpl. C. Bowd, Engineers
- Pte. S. G. P. Bowman, Inf.
- Sgt. E. Brady, Inf.
- L. Cpl. H. C. Brighton, Inf.
- L. Cpl. C. A. Britton, Inf.
- L. Sgt. W. F. Brook, Inf.
- Pte. A. H. Brown, Army Medical Corps
- L. Cpl. A. P. Brown, Machine Gun Corps
- Spr. J. A. Brown, Engineers
- Cpl. R. J. Bretherton, Field Arty.
- Sgt. F. C. Bugden, Engineers
- Sgt. E. S. Bulling, Anzac Provost Corps
- Cpl. G. E. Burnell, Engineers
- Pte. W. C. Burr, Inf.
- Sgt. W. Burris, Field Arty.
- Pte. R. U. Burt, Inf.
- Pte. R. W. Bushell, Inf.
- Gnr. A. T. Byrne, Field Arty.
- Pte. A. J. Carter, Inf.
- Sgt. L. L. Carter, Inf.
- Pte. T. Carter, Inf.
- Pte. E. Casey, Machine Gun Corps
- Cpl. G. W. Cassell, Inf.
- Pte. P. Chalmers, Inf.
- Pte. T. M. Chalmers, Inf.
- Spr. C. E. Chancellor, Engineers
- Pte. F. Chartes, Inf.
- Cpl. T. H. Champitt, Engineers
- Dvr. A. Clarke, Field Arty.
- Tmp Sergeant J. Clarke, Engineers
  - Far. Sergeant J. T. Clarke, Field Arty.
- Pte. A. A. Clothier, Inf.
- L. Cpl. H. A. Clothier, Engineers
- Gnr. M. F. Cockburn, Field Arty.
- Pte. E. D. Collings, Inf.
- Pte. W. Colliver, Inf.
- Cpl. G. E. Conley, Pioneer Battalion
- Cpl. C. A. Coombes, Army Medical Corps
- L. Cpl. C. W. Cooper, Machine Gun Corps
- Cpl. F. S. H. Crafter, Inf.
- Gnr. B. H. Crowley, Field Arty.
- L. Sgt. R. J. Crowe, Inf.
- L. Cpl. G. Cruickshank, Engineers
- Cpl. H. G. Gumming, Inf.
- Sgt. N. W. Daniel, Inf.
- Pte. J. D'Arcy, Army Medical Corps
- Spr. G. Davidson, Engineers
- Gnr. D. Davies, Field Arty.
- Sgt. H. F. Davis, Inf.
- Pte. G. E. Dawson, Inf.
- Spr. C. J. Deam, Engineers
- Pte. S. J. Devitt, Inf.
- Pte. D. E. Dickson, Army Medical Corps
- Tmp Bombardier C. C. Dixon, Medium Trench Mortar Battery
- Sgt. C. Donkin, Inf.
- Pte. J. Downie, Pioneer Battalion
- Pte. E. M. Dreger, Inf.
- Pte. R. G. Drew, Inf.
- Pte. T. M. Dunbar, Inf.
- Pte. A. E. Dunkinson, Inf.
- Pte. R. Austin, Army Medical Corps
- Dvr. S. Dunstan, Army Service Corps
- Pte. A. A. Durrington, Inf.
- Pte. T. J. Dwyer, Inf.
- Pte. C. W. J. Dykes, Inf.
- Pte. W. Earl, Machine Gun Corps
- Cpl. A. Easy, Engineers
- Spr. N. L. Edmonds, Engineers
- Cpl. A. W. Edwards, Inf.
- Pte. C. Edwards, Inf.
- Pte. E. B. Errington, Inf.
- Pte. W. H. English, Inf.
- Cpl. A. Erickson, Inf.
- L. Cpl. S. F. Erwin, Inf.
- Pte. H. Evans, Inf.
- Cpl. W. J. Evans, Field Arty.
- Pte. J. Fahey, Inf.
- L. Cpl. A. E. Fergusson, Inf.
- 2nd Cpl. J. W. B. Fieldhouse, Engineers
- Pte..E. F. Fox, Inf.
- Staff Sergeant G. Francis, Anzac Provost Corps
- Sgt. L. B. Franklin, Inf.
- L. Cpl. L. Franks, Inf.
- L. Cpl. E. N. Fraeer, Inf.
- Sgt. E. H. Fry, Army Medical Corps
- Sgt. E. Fugger, Inf.
- L. Cpl. W. H. Fullwood, Pioneer Battalion
- Pte. J. H. Gaffney, Inf.
- Dvr. C. Gallop, Field Arty.
- Sgt. H. J. Gardiner, Army Medical Corps
- Pte. A. F. E. Gay, Machine Gun Corps
- Pte. E. A. Gerdts, Inf.
- Pte. H. E. Gibbs, Pioneer Battalion
- Sgt. T. Gibson, Inf.
- Staff Sergeant E. A. Godfrey, A. Dental Corps
- Sgt. G. D. Gorry, Field Arty.
- Cpl. W. J. Gourlay, Inf.
- Gnr.N. B. Grainger, Field Arty.
- L. Cpl. J. H. Green, Light Horse Reg.
- Sgt. W. Greenlees, Inf.
- Spr. H. V. Grose, Engineers
- Gnr. A. C. Guerin, Field Arty.
- Pte. P. L. Gundry, Army Medical Corps
- Pte. J. G. Guthridge, Inf.
- Pte. W. J. Hagan, Inf.
- Tmp Cpl. J. C. Hageman, Inf.
- L. Cpl. C. F. Hall, Army Service Corps
- Pte. J. Hall, Inf.
- Sgt. E. A. Halliday, Inf.
- Pte. A. Hamilton, Inf.
- Pte. W. H. Hammersley, Inf.
- Pte. M. J. Hannigan, Light Trench Mortar Battery
- Pte. O. T. M. Hansen, Army Medical Corps
- Pte. D. J. Hardy, Inf.
- Bombr. S. S. Hare, Medium Trench Mortar Battery
- Sgt. C. F. W. Harris, Inf.
- Sgt. H. P. Harris, Engineers
- Gnr. M. Harte, Medium Trench Mortar Battery
- Pte. O. J. Harwood, Inf.
- Pte. F. C. Heiden, Inf.
- Sgt. T. W. Heritage, Pioneer Battalion
- Sgt. L. W. Hill, Engineers
- Pte. J. Holland, Inf.
- L. Cpl. J. Hook, Inf.
- Dvr. C. S. Hougli, Field Arty.
- Gnr. J. Hazelwood, Field Arty.
- Sgt. J. W. Humphreys, Army Service Corps
- Tmp Bombardier E. I. Hunter, Field Arty.
- Pte. K. J. Hutton, Machine Gun Corps
- Gnr. C. L. Irvine, Field Arty.
- Pte. J. Irwin, Inf.
- 2nd Cpl. W. Irwin, Engineers
- Cpl. E. A. Ison, Inf.
- Sgt. A. H. Jackson, Inf.
- L. Sgt. J. A. James-Wallace, Inf.
- L. Cpl. W. J. Jameson, Engineers
- Pte. W. H. Jenkins, Inf.
- Pte. E. C. Jennings, Inf.
- Sgt. J. Joel, Inf.
- L. Cpl. C. H. Johansen, Inf.
- Cpl. W. E. Johnson, Inf.
- Cpl. A. Jones, Inf.
- Pte. E. Jones, Inf.
- Sgt. W. J. Jones, Pioneer Battalion
- Sgt. L. Kaiser, Field Arty.
- Pte. F. E. Kasenhagen, Inf.
- Pte. A. T. Kermode, Inf.
- Pte. E. V. Keogh, Machine Gun Corps
- Pte. T. J. Keppel, Inf.
- Pte. W. T. Kevin, Inf.
- Pte. S. King, Inf.
- Cpl. G. A. Kirkpatrick, Cyclist Corps
- Pte. E. G. Knight, Inf.
- Pte. W. A. Knight, Inf.
- Dvr. W. B. Knox, Field Arty.
- Pte. H. C. Lack, Inf.
- Spr. B. C. Lancaster, Engineers
- Pte. H. L. Larsen, Army Medical Corps
- Tmp Cpl. B. P. Lavery, Machine Gun Corps
- L. Cpl. A. J. Leahy, Engineers
- Sgt. E. W. J. Lee, Pioneers
- Pte. S. J. Lewis, Inf.
- Sgt. W. H. Lister, Engineers
- Pte. S. Littman, Inf.
- Pte. G. J. A. Long, Inf.
- Gnr. S. F. Loughlin, Field Arty.
- Pte. W. Low, Inf.
- Pte. J. W. Lowick, Inf.
- Dvr. E. M. Lucas, Field Arty.
- Sgt. E. A. Lukins, Inf.
- Pte. T. S. W. Lusty, Inf.
- Cpl. A. B. Macauley, Inf.
- Cpl. E. G. Macauley, Army Medical Corps
- Pte. P. MacGregor, Inf.
- L. Cpl. A. Maciver, Inf.
- Tmp Cpl. E. A. Maggs, Engineers
- Tmp Cpl. C. P. Magowan, Machine Gun Corps
- Sgt. F. W. Maher, Machine Gun Corps
- Cpl. M. A. Mahony, Field Arty.
- Sgt. F. Maltby, Inf.
- L. Cpl. H. J. March, Inf.
- Pte. B. G. S. Mason, Inf.
- Cpl. H. S. Masters, Engineers
- Dvr. F. J. Mattes, Inf.
- Sgt. E. Maywood, Inf.
- Pte. H. C. McAlpine, Inf.
- Pte. H. P. McCosh, Inf.
- Pte. C. J. McCompany, Inf.
- L. Cpl. J. McDonnell, Infantry
- Pte. A. G. B. McEwan, Machine Gun Corps
- Pte. P. McGrath, Inf.
- Pte. T. J. McGregor, Inf.
- Pte. A. McInnis, Inf.
- Spr. P. McKenna, Engineers
- Pte. P. F. McKinley, Inf.
- L. Cpl. W. M. McLachlan, Inf.
- Pte. D. McLaren, Inf.
- Sgt. D. E. McLarty, Inf.
- Pte. G. McLennan, Inf.
- Bombr. H. F. McLeod, Field Arty.
- L. Cpl. H. #. McLeod, Army Medical Corps
- L. Cpl. J. J. McMahon, Inf.
- Pte. E. McMaster, Inf.
- Cpl. G. H. Mesh, Inf.
- Pte. W. B. Midgley, Inf.
- Gnr. B. C. F. Miller, Field Arty.
- Pte. G. C. Miles, Inf.
- Pte. K. Moles, Inf.
- Pte. J. Moloney, Inf.
- Tmp C.S. Maj. D. T. Moriarty, Machine Gun Corps
- Gnr. S. E. Morley, Field Arty.
- Pte. W. J. Morris, Inf.
- Pte. J. H. Mumford, Inf.
- L. Cpl. J. E. Munt, Inf.
- Cpl. J. Napier, Inf.
- Pte. P. V. Neilson, Inf.
- 2nd Cpl. H. Neville, Engineers
- L. Cpl. A. E. Newell, Inf.
- Pte. H. Newell, Inf.
- Tmp Cpl. N. Nylander, Inf.
- Pte. P. O'Donohue, Inf.
- L. Cpl. S. O'Gorman, Inf.
- Pte. J. O'Hara, Inf.
- Spr. D. H. Oliver, Engineers
- Pte. H. G. Oliver, Inf.
- Pte. W. P. Oliver, Inf.
- Cpl. G. D. O'Neil, Inf.
- L. Cpl. A. T. Orton, Machine Gun Corps
- Pte. L. A. Osborn, Inf.
- L. Cpl. E. Ottosen, Inf.
- Cpl. E. A. Painter, Light Trench Mortar Battery
- Sgt. R. Parker, Inf.
- Pte. W. Partridge, Inf.
- Pte. W. L. Pass, Australian Army Medical Corps
- Gnr. J. Paterson, Field Arty.
- Pte. W. J. Patterson, Inf.
- L. Cpl. W. J. H. Patterson, Inf.
- Cpl. W. E. Peach, Inf.
- Pte. A. V. Pethericky, Inf.
- Pte. H. J. Pettingill, Inf.
- 2nd Cpl. W. W. Pinkhard, Lt. Railway Company
- Pte. E. L. Pleass, Inf.
- Pte. G. W. Pope, Inf.
- Pte. A. A. Porter, Inf.
- Pte. T. Porter, Inf.
- Pte. W. F. Powell, Inf.
- Pte. C. L. Power, Inf.
- Cpl. A. Prentice, Inf.
- L. Cpl. H. P. Prest, Inf.
- Pte. J. T. Price, Trench Mortar Battery
- Sgt. J. C. Proctor, Pioneer Battalion
- Cpl. L. Pryde, Field Arty.
- Sgt. C. S. Pugh, Machine Gun Corps
- Cpl. J. E. Purdey, Engineers
- Cpl. J. B. Quartermaine, Light Trench Mortar Battery
- Pte. J. A. Quinlan, Inf.
- L. Cpl. J. Regan, Army Medical Corps
- Tmp Cpl. E. R. G. Rendell, Inf.
- L. Cpl. G. C. Reynolds, Inf.
- Pte. H. L. Riggs, Inf.
- Bombr. R. D. Richards, Field Arty.
- Pte. H. Ritchie, Inf.
- Sgt. L. T. F. Robbins, Inf.
- Dvr. E. J. S. Roberts, Field Arty.
- L. Cpl. G. T. Roberts, Inf.
- Pte. R. M. Robertson, Inf.
- Pte. G. H. Robinson, Army Medical Corps
- Gnr. B. R. Rochester, Field Arty.
- Pte. M. F. Rowlings, Inf.
- Sgt. J. Ryan, Machine Gun Corps
- Pte. J. Saddington, Inf.
- Pte. A. Y. Sambrook Inf.
- Bombr. C. Sanders, Field Arty.
- Spr. G. Sanderson, Engineers
- Tmp Bombardier A. Scott, Field Arty.
- Sgt. F. Scott, Inf.
- L. Cpl. G. H. Scott, Inf.
- Pte. W. J. Scott, Inf.
- Pte. F. L. Schramm, Inf.
- Tmp Sergeant W. H. Sedgley, Army Service Corps
- Gnr. H. P. Sennett, Field Arty.
- L. Cpl. W. J. Setter, Machine Gun Corps
- Pte. P. Sexton, Inf.
- Tmp Cpl. P. J. Sexton, Light Horse Reg.
- Gnr. B. Seymour, Field Arty.
- Pte. C. E. Seymour, Inf.
- Pte. J. F. G. Shales, Inf.
- Gnr.E. K. Sharp, Field Arty.
- Pte. J.R. T. Sheahan, Light Trench Mortar Battery
- Pte. J. Sheehan, Inf.
- Pte. W. Shiels, Inf., attd. Machine Gun Company
- Sgt. O. A. Siden, Inf.
- Pte. J. B. Skinner, Inf.
- Gnr. E. H. Smith, Field Arty.
- Sgt. H. J. Smith, Inf.
- Pte. L. C. Smith, Army Medical Corps
- Sgt. L. J. Smith, Pioneer Battalion
- Pte. R. Smith, Inf.
- Pte. T. Smith, Pioneer Battalion
- Sgt. W. Smith, Inf.
- Pte. W. D. Smith, Machine Gun Corps
- Sgt. J. T. Spranklin, Inf.
- L. Cpl. M. Stafford, Army Medical Corps
- Pte. W. E. Stanbury, Inf.
- Dvr. W. Steer, Army Medical Corps
- Pte. A. H. Stevens, Inf.
- 2nd Cpl. A. M. Stewart, Engineers
- Sgt. J. H. Stewart, Inf.
- Sgt. G. H. Stoddart, Inf.
- Cpl. L. R. Strother, Machine Gun Corps
- Pte. W. J. Stuart, Inf.
- Pte. F. H. Sullivan, Inf.
- Pte. R. M. Sullivan, Inf.
- Pte. L. J. Sunderland, Army Medical Corps
- Pte. H. Talbot, Inf.
- Sgt. H. S. Taylor, Field Arty.
- Gnr. S. J. Taylor, Field Arty.
- Spr. C. C. Tayt, Engineers
- Pte. C. W. Thomas, Inf.
- L. Cpl. J. H. Thomas, Inf.
- Pte. N. J. F. Thomas, Army Medical Corps
- Spr. H. Thompson, Engineers
- Pte. A. R. Tibbetts, Inf.
- Pte. D. W. Tobin, Inf.
- Gnr. E. A. F. Tocknell, Field Arty.
- L. Cpl. W. S. Touchell, Engineers
- Pte. B. D. Tranter, Inf.
- Pte. D. L. Treweek, Inf.
- Pte. R. Trimble, Inf.
- Pte. O. Tuami, Inf.
- Pte. E. R. Tuck, Army Medical Corps
- Dvr. A. B. Tucker, Field Arty.
- Pte. W. Tucker, Inf.
- Spr. F. C. Tuckett, Engineers
- Pte. E. C. Turner, Inf.
- L. Cpl. T. O. E. Upton, Machine Gun Corps
- Dvr. E. C. Vickery, Inf.
- Sgt. Warrant Ofc. Wade, Inf.
- Pte. W. G. Wade, Inf.
- Pte. W. R. Warren, Inf.
- Pte. J. Weare, Inf.
- L. Cpl. W. L. Webb, Inf.
- L. Cpl. G. Webber, Inf.
- Cpl. H. B. White, Inf.
- Pte. W. J. Wilkie, Inf.
- Sgt. E. Wilkinson, Engineers
- L. Sgt. F. Williams, Inf.
- Sgt. G. S. Williams, Pioneer Battalion
- Pte. H. G. Williams, Army Medical Corps
- L. Cpl. H. M. Williams. Engineers
- Pte. J. H. Wills, Inf.
- Pte. E. Winter, Inf.
- Tmp Sergeant A. W. Wood, Inf.
- Cpl. S. Woodford, Light Trench Mortar Battery
- Gnr. J. C. Woolford, Field Arty.
- Spr. A. C. N. Woolley, Engineers
- L. Cpl. J. J. H. Worland, Lt. Railway Company
- Sgt. W. A. Wright, Inf.
- Pte. C. B. Young, Inf.
- Sgt. G. M. Young, Inf.
- Cpl. J. E. Abbey, Army Medical Corps
- L. Sgt. E. Abelscaln, Anzac Prov. Corps
- Pte. M. C. Aberdeen, Army Medical Corps
- L. Cpl. A. S. Adolfsson, Inf.
- Pte. A. Alexander, Inf.
- Sgt. A. O. Anderson, Inf.
- Sgt. H. L. Appleton, Inf.
- Pte. P. L. Arnold, Inf.
- Pte. L. Atherton, Army Medical Corps
- L. Cpl. G. Arthur, Inf.
- L. Cpl. R. S. Baker, Inf.
- Spr. J. H. Baillie, Engineers
- Pte. D. Bain, Inf.
- Pte. W. R. Bear, Inf.
- Pte. H. Barnes, Inf.
- Pte. P. E. Bazley, Machine Gun Corps
- Pte. L. Beggs, Inf.
- Pte. H. H. Bell, Inf.
- Pte. M. R. Bell, Inf.
- Pte. R. C. Bellingham, Inf.
- L. Cpl. W. Benson, Army Medical Corps
- Pte. M. Bernier, Inf.
- Pte. J. C. Berriman, Machine Gun Corps
- L. Cpl. H. V. Berry, Army Medical Corps
- Sgt. C. Birtles, Inf.
- Sgt. A.E. Bladwell, Inf.
- Sgt. F. W. Blencowe, Inf.
- Pte. W. G. Bliss, Army Medical Corps
- Pte. J. M. Boardman, Army Medical Corps
- Cpl. M. C. Bonnar, Engineers
- Pte. H. Bowden, Inf.
- Sgt. T. F. Bowden, Inf.
- L. Cpl. D. H. Brereton, Inf.
- Cpl. E. G. Brewer, Inf.
- Cpl. F. G. Briscoe, Pioneer Battalion
- Spr. H. F. Broadbent, Engineers
- Pte. P. J. Broder, Inf.
- Pte. W. Bromwich, Inf.
- Pte. W. H. Brooksbank, Trench Mortar Battery
- Cpl. R. Brown, Inf.
- Pte. A. Browne, Inf.
- Sgt. J. F. Burton, Inf.
- Pte. A. L. Cadman, Inf.
- Pte. E. E. Calf, Army Medical Corps
- Dvr. W. E. Callaghan, Army Service Corps
- Sgt. R. McL. Campbell, Inf.
- Pte. H. C. Capon, Inf.
- L. Cpl. F. J. Caporn, Inf.
- L. Cpl. S. G. Carter, Inf.
- Pte. J. I. Chadwick, Army Medical Corps
- L. Cpl. H. D. Chapman, Inf.
- Cpl. S. J. Clark, Inf.
- Pte. A. E. Clayton, Inf.
- Dvr. H. F. Coates, Army Service Corps
- L. Cpl. R. L. Collen, Army Service Corps
- Pte. L. W. Colley-Priest, Army Medical Corps
- Pte. J. H. Connors, Army Medical Corps
- Pte. O. S. Cook, Inf.
- Sgt. S. F. Cooling, Inf.
- Pte. J. W. Coots, Army Medical Corps
- Pte. W. D. Cornish, Inf.
- Pte. J. R. Cosgrove, Inf.
- Pte. A. E. Costin, Inf.
- L. Cpl. J. W. Cotter, Inf.
- Pte. W. H. Coull, Machine Gun Corps
- Pte. L. Crawford, Inf.
- Sgt. M. H. Cummings, Army Service Corps
- Sgt. J. Cummins, Inf
- Pte. G. Davidson, Inf.
- Pte. J. F. Dawes, Inf.
- L. Sgt. R. J. Denny, Inf.
- Pte. L. S. Deviland, Inf.
- Dvr. P. G. Dixen, Army Service Corps
- Sgt. R. C. Dunbar, Engineers
- Pte. A. S. E. Earnshaw, Inf.
- L. Sgt. T. Eccles, Inf.
- L. Cpl. W. E. Este, Army Medical Corps
- Pte. A. W. Fairgrieve, Engineers
- Pte. J. Ferguson, Inf.
- Sgt. M. M. Fitzpatrick, Machine Gun Corps
- L. Cpl. 6. J. Flynn, Army Medical Corps
- Capt. H. W. Franks, Army Medical Corps
- Sgt. W. D. Fraser, Inf.
- Pte. J. H. P. Frazer, Inf.
- L. Cpl. C. R. Fry, Inf.
- Sgt. C. E. Fuller, Inf.
- L. Cpl. W. D. Fulton, Inf.
- Sgt.. A. F. H. Gabriel, Inf.
- Pte. P. J. Gilchrist, Inf.
- Pte. J. Glover, Inf.
- Pte. R. T. Godfrey, Inf.
- Sgt. R. O. Goldsmith, Inf.
- Pte. T. Gorman, Inf.
- Pte. M. S. Goyder, Army Medical Corps
- Sgt. F. G. Grange, Inf.
- Pte. R. E. Grant, Inf.
- Pte. W. C. Gray, Inf.
- Pte. G. Green, Inf.
- Spr. T. A. Griffiths, Engineers
- L. Cpl. J. H. Grono, Inf.
- Pte. A. J. Gummersall, Inf.
- L. Cpl. F. Hallam, Inf.
- Sgt. A. Hardie, Inf.
- Pte. H. L. S. Harrop, Inf.
- Pte. J. W. Hart, Inf.
- Sgt. J. T. McK. Harvie, Inf.
- Tmp Cpl. C. H. Hatt, Inf.
- Pte. G. T. Hayden, Inf.
- Pte. A. Haysom, Army Medical Corps
- Pte. L. Hermon, Inf.
- Pte. J. J. Hewitson, Inf.
- Pte. W. A. Hippsley, Army Medical Corps
- Pte. H. J. Hockley, Inf.
- Pte. G. H. B. Holloway, Inf.
- Pte. A. Holman, Inf.
- Pte. W. A. Hooper, Inf.
- Pte. G. Hope, Army Medical Corps
- Pte. G. T. Hopper, Inf.
- Sgt. E. Hopwood, Inf.
- Pte. F. W. Howell, Inf.
- Pte. W. D. Hume, Inf.
- L. Cpl. A. J. Hunt, Army Medical Corps
- Pte. R. M. Ilett, Inf.
- Cpl. R. A. Jackson, Inf.
- L. Cpl. J. L. James, Engineers
- Pte. J. H. Johns, Inf.
- L. Cpl. D. W. Johnson, Inf.
- L. Cpl. P. Kelly, Inf.
- Cpl. W. C. Ketchen, Inf.
- Cpl. L. H. Kew-Ming, Inf.
- Sgt. E. Kidman, Army Medical Corps
- Pte. P. J. King, Inf.
- L. Cpl. C. Larson, Anzac Provost Corps
- Pte. W. J. A. Layburn, Inf.
- Dvr. A. F. Lemon, Army Medical Corps
- Cpl. V. M. Letman, Inf.
- Pte. J. Lewis, Inf.
- Pte. A. Lillico, Inf.
- Pte. A. L. Lindeberg, Machine Gun Corps
- Pte. F. Lindsay, Inf.
- Pte. H. W. Liviston, Inf.
- Cpl. J. L. Lovell, Machine Gun Corps
- Sgt. B. E. Luke, Inf.
- Tmp Cpl. P. J. Lynch, Inf.
- Pte. J. J. Madigan, Inf.
- Sgt. R. D. Marrott, Army Medical Corps
- Cpl. H. Marshall, Inf.
- Cpl. E. A. C. Marshman, Inf.
- L. Cpl. D. G. Martin, Machine Gun Corps
- Tmp Cpl. A. W. Marura, Inf.
- Tmp Sergeant R. E. Massey, Inf.
- Sgt. J. Masterton, Inf.
- Sgt. A. H. Matheson, Army Medical Corps
- L. Cpl. W. Mathews, Engineers
- Dvr. W. J. Mathews, Inf.
- Pte. W. F. Matthews, Inf.
- Pte. H. G. McCaffery, Army Medical Corps
- L. Cpl. A. McCallum, Inf.
- L. Cpl. W. McCallum, Army Medical Corps
- Pte. N. S. McColl, Inf.
- Pte. C. McCormack, Inf.
- Spr. G. L. V. McDonald, Engineers
- Sgt. W. H. McKeon, Inf.
- Pte. R. McNamara, Inf.
- Pte. H. McNaughton, Inf.
- Pte. J. F. R. McRae, Inf.
- Pte. H. Meyers, Trench Mortar Battery
- Pte. W. A. H. Miller, Army Medical Corps
- L. Cpl. G. Milner, Inf.
- Pte. E. W. Moberley, Inf.
- Tmp Sergeant R. W. Moffatt, Inf.
- Pte. M. Molloy, Inf.
- Pte. C. R. Moore, Inf.
- L. Cpl. D. G. Moore, Army Medical Corps
- L. Cpl. J. J. Moran, Inf.
- Pte. E. Morley, Army Medical Corps
- Pte. J. T. Morley, Inf.
- Spr. L. W. Morris, Engineers
- Pte. W. B. Morris, Army Medical Corps
- Sgt. E. G. Murray, Machine Gun Corps
- Pte. J. W. Naylor, Inf.
- Pte. A. C. Neale, Inf.
- Cpl. R. H. Nelson, Inf.
- Pte. H. R. Nicholas, Army Medical Corps
- Pte. T. A. Nicholson, Inf.
- Cpl. S. J. Nimmo, Inf.
- L. Cpl. J. N. Noble, Machine Gun Corps
- Pte. C. L. Normington, Inf.
- Dvr. J. Nute, Army Service Corps
- Cpl. A. J. G. O'Connor, Inf.
- Pte. P. R. O'Connor, Inf.
- L. Sgt. H. R. O'Neil, Inf.
- Pte. F. O. Oliver, Army Medical Corps
- Spr. J. G. Pannell, Engineers
- Pte. L. T. Paternoster, Army Medical Corps
- Pte. R. J. Pearce, Inf.
- Sgt. W. Pearson, Inf.
- Pte. H. D. Phipps, Trench Mortar Battery
- Pte. A. S. H. Picking, Army Medical Corps
- Pte. C. H. Piddington, Inf.
- Cpl. W. C. Piggott, Inf.
- Pte. W. J. J. Piper, Inf.
- Pte. R. J. Place, Inf.
- Cpl. W. Pollard, Inf.
- Pte. C. W. Potter, Inf.
- Pte. W. J. Pound, Inf.
- L. Cpl. J. H. Powell, Army Medical Corps
- Sgt. W. G. Price, Inf.
- Sgt. A. G. Prime, Inf.
- Pte. P. S. Proudfoot, Inf.
- Pte. J. Puckeridge, Inf.
- L. Cpl. W. Pugh, Inf.
- Sgt. J. J. Radley, Inf.
- Sgt. J. W. Raitt, Inf.
- Tmp Sergeant P. E. Ralph, Inf.
- Cpl. C. Ramsden, Inf.
- Pte. A. J. Ray, Army Medical Corps
- Pte. L. J. Rayner, Inf.
- Pte. J. T. Rees, Army Medical Corps
- Sgt. H. A. Richards, Inf.
- Pte. J. W. Ridgway, Army Medical Corps
- Pte. G. J. Ritchie, Inf.
- Sgt. D. Roberts, Inf.
- Pte. W. S. Robins, Machine Gun Corps
- Cpl. R. Roff, Inf.
- Pte. J. Rollins, Inf.
- Pte. A. S. Rookwood, Inf.
- Pte. J. R. Rowley, Inf.
- Pte. F. Saffin, Inf.
- Pte. E. Saker, Army Medical Corps
- Pte. B. Shaw, Inf.
- Sgt. G. J. Shepperd, Inf.
- Cpl. C. A. Silk, Army Medical Corps
- Pte. A. G. Smith, Inf.
- L. Sgt. N. H. Smith, Light Horse Reg.
- Pte. S. Smith, Inf.
- Sgt. W. A. Smith, Light Horse Reg.
- Pte. W. S. Smith, Army Medical Corps
- Cpl. H. Spotswood, Inf.
- Pte. H. Stevenson, Machine Gun Corps
- Pte. J. H. Stewart, Inf.
- Pte. R. J. Strachan, Inf.
- Cpl. E. T. Symons, Army Medical Corps
- Sgt. R. W. Thomas, Inf.
- L. Cpl. J. F. Thompson, Inf.
- L. Cpl. V. V. Thorpe, Army Medical Corps
- Pte. J. Thyne, Inf.
- Spr. G. S. H. Tierney, Engineers
- Pte. W. R. Tooley, Inf.
- Pte. V. Toppin, Inf.
- Cpl. E. J. Trent, Inf.
- Cpl. C. L. Trewartha, Inf.
- Sgt. A. Troope, Army Medical Corps
- Pte. T. W. Turnbull, Inf.
- Pte. F. J. Turner, Inf.
- Pte. S. J. Tytler, Inf.
- Sgt. V. Vains, Inf.
- Pte. W. Varrie, Inf.
- L. Cpl. H. N. Wallace, Inf.
- Sgt. A. A. Walls, Inf.
- Pte. H. J. Warburton, Inf.
- Pte. E. R. Ward, Inf.
- Sgt. L. R. Ward, Inf.
- Pte. R. J. Ward, Machine Gun Corps
- Pte. W. Ward, Machine Gun Corps
- Pte. J. M. S. Wasson, Army Medical Corps
- Cpl. G. Watson, Engineers
- Pte. E. R. Watts, Army Medical Corps
- Pte. F. West, Inf.
- Sgt. J. Whitmee, Inf.
- Pte. F. W. Wiggins, Army Medical Corps
- Pte. F. M. Wilkinson, Machine Gun Corps
- Pte. P. Williams, Inf.
- Pte. H. E. Williamson, Inf.
- Spr. A. J. Wilson, Engineers
- Spr. R. S. Wilson, Engineers
- L. Cpl. M. F. Wormald, Inf.
- Cpl. C. H. Wyatt, Inf.
- Cpl. G. Young, Trench Mortar Battery
- L. Cpl. G. E. Younie, Inf.

Canadian Force

- Gnr. L. C. Axton, Garrison Arty.
- Cpl. G. R. Bagshawe, Railway Troops
- Cpl. E. Baker, Machine Gun Corps
- Sgt. A. L.Bardwell, Railway Troops
- Spr. J. E. Bates, Engineers
- Spt. J. M. Beatty, Engineers
- Dvr. F. H. Bousquet, Field Arty.
- Spr. H. J. Brazier, Engineers
- Cpl. F. Burgess, Engineers
- Sgt. F. S. Butler, Army Medical Corps
- Pte. T. Canning, Army Medical Corps
- L. Cpl. N. Dorey, Engineers
- Pte. G. T. Davis, Army Medical Corps
- L. Cpl. W. M. Doyle, Machine Gun Corps
- Spr. M. G. Evans, Engineers
- Sgt. J. A. D. Frechette, Machine Gun Corps
- L. Cpl. M. Fredin, Labour Battalion
- Cpl. J. Gaskell, Railway Troops
- Cpl. R. S. Greenaway, Army Medical Corps
- Cpl. S. A. Hamilton, Railway Troops
- Pte. J. V. Hartwell, Machine Gun Corps
- Cpl. G. A. Johnson, Railway Troops
- Dvr. H. King, Army Service Corps
- Pte. J. F. Livingston, Labour Battalion
- L. Cpl. J. MacDonald, Engineers
- Pte. D. Mackenzie, Machine Gun Corps
- Cpl. F. P. McKenna, Machine Gun Corps
- Pte. L. McLaren, Machine Gun Corps
- Spr. C. C. Maddison, Railway Troops
- Sgt. M. E. Martin, Army Medical Corps
- Pte. F. J. Miles, Army Medical Corps
- Sgt. A. F. Morrison, Railway Troops
- Spr. C. M. Patmore, Engineers
- Pte. S. J. Patterson, Army Medical Corps
- Sgt. W. A. Plant, Army Medical Corps
- Cpl. P. C. Rawling, Railway Troops
- 2nd Cpl. D. Reid, Engineers
- Pte. H. H. Riley, Army Medical Corps
- Pte. J. M. Ritchie, Army Medical Corps
- Cpl. F. E. Ross, Army Medical Corps
- Pte. G. C. Sanson, Machine Gun Corps
- Spr. W. A. Scott, Railway Troops
- Dvr. G. A. Shatford, Army Service Corps
- Spr. A. Smith, Railway Troops
- Cpl. J. Smith, Garrison Arty.
- Pte. F. A. Smithers, Army Medical Corps
- L. Cpl. J. Steadman, Railway Troops
- Spr. R. Stephenson, Engineers
- Pte. G. J. Tomlinson, Army Medical Corps
- Spr. G. Trutch, Engineers
- Spr. H. G. Vines, Engineers
- Spr. E. W. Wilson, Engineers
- Pte. E. M. Webber, Machine Gun Corps
- 2nd Cpl. W. A. Young, Engineers
- Pte. W. Le R. Collins, Inf.
- Pte. J. Llewellyn, Inf.
- Pte. D. A. Bell, Inf.
- Pte. H. Bolton, Inf.
- Pte. W. Bowden, Inf. (Pioneers)
- Dvr. A. Collings, Field Arty.
- Sgt. G. Cross, Inf.
- L. Cpl. G. E. Curtis, Engineers
- Pte. J. O. Davidson, Inf.
- Spr. A. V. Dolman, Railway Troops
- Sgt. L. S. Eiler, Inf.
- Bombr. W. Fallas, Field Arty.
- Dvr. F. J. Gray, Field Arty.
- Gnr. W. S. Hamilton, Field Arty.
- Pte. F. Hill, Inf.
- Sgt. J. H. Jarvis, Inf.
- Sgt. G. Love, Machine Gun Corps
- Bombr. B. C. Macdonald, Field Arty.
- Sgt. J. F. MacNaughton, Field Arty.
- Sgt. T. R. Maitland, Inf.
- Sgt. J. Marshall, Railway Troops
- Sgt. J. McCallum, Inf.
- Cpl. G. E. McCarthy, Inf.
- Sgt. W. G. McCullagh, Inf.
- Pte. A. P. McDonald, Light Trench Mortar Battery
- L. Sgt. N. McIntosh, Inf.
- Sgt. C. McKinney, Inf.
- Dvr. A. G. Moore, Army Service Corps
- Sgt. G. W. Morrison, Inf.
- Pte. A. Oakes, Inf.
- Sgt. E. Ofstedahl, Inf.
- Sgt. S. Packham, Inf.
- Dvr. H. A. Paquette, Army Service Corps
- Sgt. E. T. Raike, Field Arty.
- Act. Sgt. L. R. Reece, Army Service Corps
- Pte. G. Richards, Inf.
- Pte. C. T. Saunders, Inf. (Pioneers)
- Sgt. G. W. Scots, Inf.
- Spr. W. V. Shepherd, Engineers
- Spr. B. Speight, Railway Troops
- Pte. G. Spourles, Inf.
- Pte. W. R. Stobart, Inf.
- Sgt. J. C. Stocker, Inf.
- Sgt. V. Swayne, Inf.
- Dvr. S. Trewin, Field Arty.
- Sgt. G. W. Trollope, Inf.
- Cpl. S. B. Wareham, Field Arty.

New Zealand Force

- Bombr. A. Ashworth, Field Arty.
- Gnr. C. M. Blackwell, Field Arty.
- Tpr. N. M. Douglas, Mounted Rifles
- Gnr. G. C. Girdlestone, Field Arty.
- Cpl. W. R. Graham, Mounted Rifles
- Tpr. W. R. D. Laurie, Mounted Rifles
- Gnr. J. R. MacLean, Field Arty.
- Bombr. W. Mawdsley, Field Arty.
- Tpr. H. McGuckin, Mounted Rifles
- Gnr. E. W. Moore, Field Arty.
- Gnr. P. Murphy, Field Arty.
- Tpr. J. Smillie, Mounted Rifles
- Dvr. R. P. Sperry, Field Arty.
- Tpr. D. W. Thomson, Mounted Rifles
- Signaller Cpl. G. S. Watt, Mounted Rifles
- Tpr. J. Wilkinson, Mounted Rifles
- L. Cpl. O. F. T. Young, Mounted Rifles
- Pte. R. M. V. Abbott, Otago Reg.
- L. Cpl. V. Atkinson, Canterbury Reg.
- Pte. J. T. Baigent, Canterbury Reg.
- Sgt. A. G. Bowater, Otago Reg.
- L. Cpl. M. C. Bromell, Canterbury Reg.
- Sgt. F. D. Carter, Canterbury Reg.
- Pte. G. Chandler, Otago Reg.
- Act. Sgt. B. V. Cooksley, New Zealand Engineers
- Pte. O. Creighton, Otago Reg.
- L. Cpl. A. W. Danby, New Zealand Engineers
- Pte. T. Dron, Canterbury Reg.
- Sgt. C. M. Duncan, Otago Reg.
- L. Cpl. A. G. Erikson, Canterbury Reg.
- Pte. P. Everett, Canterbury Reg.
- L. Sgt. G. E. Fletcher, Otago Reg.
- L. Cpl. D. McM. Fullarton, New Zealand Engineers
- Spr. J. W. Garnett, New Zealand Engineers
- Pte. J. Gillon, Canterbury Reg.
- Pte. J. Glassey, Canterbury Reg.
- Pte. A. C. Graham, Canterbury Reg.
- Sgt. T. W. Harrington, Canterbury Reg.
- Cpl. R. W. Hawkes, Otago Reg.
- Cpl. C. F. V. Hinton, Canterbury Reg.
- Spr. J. Houston, New Zealand Engineers
- 2nd Cpl. A. A. Howard, New Zealand Engineers
- Pte. A. Hudson, Otago Reg.
- Pte. J. R. Hunter, Otago Reg.
- Cpl. T. O. Johnson, Canterbury Reg.
- Dvr. R. Johnstone, New Zealand Engineers
- Pte. R. H. Louden, Otago Reg.
- Cpl. R. McDowell, Canterbury Reg.
- Pte. B. McKay, Canterbury Reg.
- Spr. J. W. McKay, New Zealand Engineers
- Pte. J. McRohan, Canterbury Reg.
- Pte. R. F. Melgren, Canterbury Reg.
- Pte. E. A. Millis, Otago Reg.
- Pte. T. A. Mooney, Otago Reg.
- Pte. H. W. E. Morris, Otago Reg.
- Pte. J. H. Morris, Canterbury Reg.
- Pte. K. Morrison, Otago Reg.
- Pte. M. L. Nelsen, Canterbury Reg.
- Sgt. A. G. Newcomb, New Zealand Machine Gun Corps
- Cpl. A. H. Nield, Canterbury Reg.
- 2nd Cpl. L. A. Noble, New Zealand Engineers
- Pte. D. P. Noonan, Canterbury Reg.
- Cpl. L. J. Palmer, New Zealand Engineers
- Cpl. H. Parker, Otago Reg.
- Pte. L. J. K. Parker, Otago Reg.
- Sgt. R. A. Parton, Canterbury Reg.
- Cpl. B. Paulson, Otago Reg.
- Cpl. R. Quin, Otago Reg.
- Pte. G. L. Rowe, Canterbury Reg.
- Pte. S. E. Rutherford, Otago Reg.
- Cpl. H. J. Simon, Otago Reg.
- Sgt. F. W. P. Simpson, Canterbury Reg.
- Cpl. R. Smith, Canterbury Reg.
- Spr. A. Springall, New Zealand Engineers
- L. Cpl. F. W. Stevenson, Canterbury Reg.
- Sgt. J. Stuart, New ZealandMachine Gun Corps
- L. Cpl. W. Sullivan, Otago Reg.
- L. Cpl. L. L. Tallke, Otago Reg.
- Spr. A. E. Taylor, New Zealand Engineers
- 2nd Cpl. G. H. Thorpe, New Zealand Engineers
- L. Cpl. D. N. Treleaven, New Zealand Engineers
- Sgt. H. H. Turner, Canterbury Reg.
- Pte. S. R. Tutty, Otago Reg.
- Sgt. A. L. M. Willis, New Zealand Engineers
- L. Cpl. J. A. Wilson, New Zealand Engineers
- Pte. L. E. J. Worthington, Wellington Reg.
- Pte. J. W. Young, Otago Reg.
- Pte. J. Adams, Rifle Brigade
- Sgt. L. F. Allan, Rifle Brigade
- Sgt. J. E. Allen, Canterbury Reg.
- Pte. E. E. Andrews, M Corps
- Pte. C. J. Arnold, Rifle Brigade
- Pte. A. T. W. Austin, M Corps
- Pte. F. W. Baillie, M Corps
- Pte. F. Backholm, Rifle Brigade
- Sgt. G. B. Baker, Cyclist Corps
- L. Cpl. J. M. Ballantyne, Rifle Brigade
- Sgt. W. Barclay, Pioneer Battalion
- Sgt. H. C. Bathurst, Rifle Brigade
- Dvr. G. Bergaminin, Army Service Corps
- Sgt. W. A. Birkett, Engineers
- Sgt. J. H. Boles, Rifle Brigade
- Pte. A. B. Booker, Rifle Brigade
- Gnr. W. Brown, Field Arty.
- Pte. F. Bruce, M Corps
  - Far. Sergeant O. C. H. Burt, Field Arty.
- Spr. A. Bushill, Engineers
- Cpl. J. H. Calderwood, Rifle Brigade
- L. Cpl. A. Cameron, Engineers
- L. Cpl. A. K. Campbell, Rifle Brigade
- Pte. S. F. Carver, M Corps
- Cpl. F. R. Cashmore, Rifle Brigade
- Cpl. A. C. Clark, Rifle Brigade
- L. Cpl. H. G. Clark, Engineers
- L. Cpl. F. A. Clarke, Rifle Brigade
- Sgt. K. M. Cole, Field Arty.
- L. Cpl. W. J. Collins, Rifle Brigade
- Gnr. W. R. Costar, Field Arty.
- Pte. G. S. Creed, Wellington Reg.
- Sgt. C. H. Davis, Field Arty.
- Sgt. H. Dean, Rifle Brigade
- Cpl. A. E. Deaine, Canterbury Reg.
- Pte. A. Diack, Otago Reg.
- Gnr. A. E. Dockery, Field Arty.
- Pte. W. T. Douglas, Rifle Brigade
- Act. Cpl. J. Duggan, Engineers
- Sgt. H. M. Duston, Rifle Brigade
- Sgt. W. B. Easton, Field Arty.
- L. Sgt. A. C. Elliott, Rifle Brigade
- Wheeler Cpl. O. Evans, Divisional Train, Army Service Corps
- Gnr. R. E. Everett, Field Arty.
- Pte. A. Everitt, Rifle Brigade
- L. Cpl. A. Flett, Rifle Brigade
- Spr. C. E. Fogelberg, Engineers
- Pte. E. J. Flynn, Canterbury Reg.
- Pte. T. F. Forrest, Auckland Reg.
- Cpl. A. E. Gibb, Engineers
- L. Sgt. O. A. Gillespie, Rifle Brigade
- Sgt. T. A. Goodfellow, Rifle Brigade
- Pte. G. H. Gradwell, Rifle Brigade
- Pte. C. A. Gray, Rifle Brigade
- Cpl. F. V. Green, M Corps
- Cpl. W. Gribble, Rifle Brigade
- Tpr. R. Guthrie, Mounted Rifles
- Pte. R. Hayter, Rifle Brigade
- Pte. M. Hennessy, Rifle Brigade
- Dvr. G. E. Henry, Field Arty.
- Pte. C. Hinds, Wellington Reg.
- Sgt. C. P. Hine, Rifle Brigade
- Sgt. F. J. Hodgson, Machine Gun Corps
- L. Cpl. J. A. Hornblow, Engineers
- L. Cpl. E. Hughes, Pioneer Battalion
- Pte. F. G. Hutchins, Rifle Brigade
- Pte. P. W. Jesse, Rifle Brigade
- Staff Sergeant A. M. Johnstone MC
- Pte. D. G. Jones, M Corps
- Pte. F. K. Judd, Rifle Brigade
- Cpl. S. A. Kay, Machine Gun Corps
- Sgt. H. W. Keesing, M Corps
- Pte. L. A. Kyle, M Corps
- Pte. J. F. Laing, Canterbury Reg.
- Sgt. H. J. Langwell, Rifle Brigade
- Pte. A. J. Lark, M Corps
- Pte. H. T. Leef, Pioneer Battalion
- Cpl. H. S. Leighton, Rifle Brigade
- Cpl. T. Lonergan, Machine Gun Corps
- Dvr. W. Lorgelly, Machine Gun Corps
- Sgt. D. A. MacGibbon, Field Arty.
- Cpl. Fitter J. H. Mains, Field Arty.
- Bombr. D. Malone, Field Arty.
- Cpl. W. Manson, M Corps
- Sgt. J. Martindale, Field Arty.
- Dvr. S. Mason, Field Arty.
- L. Cpl. G. Maxwell, Pioneer Battalion
- Cpl. J. McAusland MC
- Sgt. W. McClure, Rifle Brigade
- Sgt. A. McDonald, Rifle Brigade
- 2nd Cpl. W. D. McKinlay, Engineers
- Staff Sergeant A. D. McLennan, M Corps
- Pte. A. McLean, Rifle Brigade
- Spr. H. McMillan, Engineers
- Sgt. J. W. C. Menzies, Rifle Brigade
- L. Cpl. W. Methven, Rifle Brigade
- Pte. F. A. Meurant, Rifle Brigade
- L. Cpl. L. W. G. Millward, Field Arty.
- Cpl. A. Monkman, Rifle Brigade
- A Bombardier E. Mowbray, Field Arty.
- Pte. J. M. Munro, Rifle Brigade
- Cpl. J. Nunn, Pioneer Battalion
- Pte. J. Newberry, Rifle Brigade
- L. Cpl. R. Nagapo, Pioneer Battalion
- Spr. L. O. Nicolas, Engineers
- Cpl. T. B. O'Connor, Machine Gun Corps
- Pte. C. O'Driscoll, Rifle Brigade
- Pte. P. O'Neill, Rifle Brigade
- Pte. H. F. Orpwood, Rifle Brigade
- Cpl. W. Overend, Wellington Reg.
- Sgt. J. C. Pain, Rifle Brigade
- Pte. E. I. Paine, M Corps
- L. Cpl. J. Panoho, Pioneer Battalion
- L. Cpl. V. W. Pearce, Rifle Brigade
- Pte. R. M. Pearson, M Corps
- Sgt. W. T. Pethybridge, Auckland Reg.
- Sgt. E. E. Pope, Field Arty.
- L. Cpl. L. H. Postlewaight, Machine Gun Corps
- Spr. D. Pringle, Engineers
- A Sapper J. K. Ramsey, Engineers
- Pte. K. Ray, Auckland Reg.
- Gnr. F. V. H. Robinson, Field Arty.
- L. Cpl. L. Robinson, Army Service Corps
- Sgt. A. Rogers, Pioneer Battalion
- Sgt. H. L. Ross, Field Arty.
- Pte. H. F. Russell, Auckland Reg.
- Gnr. W. Sandison, Field Arty.
- Dvr. J. R. A. Scrimshaw, Field Arty.
- Pte. C. M. Sheat, Rifle Brigade
- L. Cpl. G. H. Shelley, Engineers
- Sgt. W. D. Smaill, Field Arty.
- Pte. F. Smith, Rifle Brigade
- Pte. W. K. Smith, Rifle Brigade
- Sgt. C. C. Southey, Cyclist Corps
- L. Cpl. O. Staite, Rifle Brigade
- Pte. D. Stevenson, Rifle Brigade
- Pte. A. Stewart, M Corps
- Pte. S. G. Stirling, Rifle Brigade
- L. Cpl. C. S. Stunell, M Corps
- Cpl. D. M. Stuart, Wellington Reg.
- Pte. J. Sullivan, Otago Reg.
- Pte. D. Tavendale, Machine Gun Corps
- L. Cpl. A. Taylor, Rifle Brigade
- Sgt. W. G. Taylor, Rifle Brigade
- Pte. P. Te Amo, Pioneer Battalion
- Sgt. C. G. Tomlinson, Rifle Brigade
- Sgt. F. G. Tott, Wellington Reg.
- L. Cpl. C. E. Town, Rifle Brigade
- Pte. W. Toy, M Corps
- Cpl. L. E. Tucker, Field Arty.
- Pte. W. C. Turner, Rifle Brigade
- Spr. J. Walker, Engineers
- Cpl. G. R. Watts, Rifle Brigade
- Sgt. W. A. White, Rifle Brigade
- Gnr. W. C. White, Field Arty.
- Pte. E. Williams, Canterbury Reg.
- Gnr. T. Williams, Field Arty.
- A Cpl. W. B. Yeoman, Army Service Corps

Newfoundland Contingent

- Pte. J. Abbott, Newfoundland Reg.
- Pte. A. Adams, Newfoundland Reg.
- Sgt. E. P. Aitken, Newfoundland Reg.
- Pte. H. Bowden, Newfoundland Reg.
- Pte. A. Bulgin, Newfoundland Reg.
- Sgt. E. Butcher, Newfoundland Reg.
- Col. H. S. Butler, Newfoundland Reg.
- Pte. J. Davis, Newfoundland Reg.
- Pte. J. Dunn, Newfoundland Reg.
- Cpl. L. J. Fitzpatriok, Newfoundland Reg.
- Pte. E. Goudy, Newfoundland Reg.
- Pte. A. Hennebury, Newfoundland Reg.
- Pte. W. Jewer, Newfoundland Reg.
- Pte. P. McDonald, Newfoundland Reg.
- Pte. W. Moore, Newfoundland Reg.
- Pte. J. E. B. Nichol, Newfoundland Reg.
- Pte. L. Paddick, Newfoundland Reg.
- Pte. C. Pafford, Newfoundland Reg.
- Pte. F. S. Rees, Newfoundland Reg.
- Cpl. H. Tansley, Newfoundland Reg.

South African Force

- Cpl. H. J. Fredericks, Cape Corps
- 2nd Cpl. F. J. Keates, Engineers
- 2nd Cpl. A. E. Dawson, South African Engineering Corps
- Sgt. W. F. Hunter, South African Engineering Corps
- Pte. C. I. Jacobs, South African Medical Corps
- Pte. F. W. Parfitt, South African Medical Corps
- Pte. H. S. Pearce, South African Medical Corps
- Pte. R. Tomsett, South African Medical Corps
- Sgt. T. J. Badcoe, Inf.
- L. Sgt. E. M. V. Barrable, Inf.
- Pibe. R. C. Biccard, Inf.
- Pte. A. J. Black, Inf.
- Sgt. F. H. Brickhill, Inf.
- Pte. V. Carlson, Inf.
- Pte. T. P. Casey, Inf.
- L. Cpl. W. Cawthorn, Inf.
- Pte. R. M. Collins, Inf.
- Pte. T. Cook, Inf.
- Cpl. H. F. Cox, Inf.
- Pte. J. J. Cronje, Inf.
- Sgt. A. Cummings, Inf.
- Pte. W. A. de Beer, Inf.
- Pte. G. Fairbairn, Inf.
- Pte. C. E. Fennesy, Inf.
- Spr. B. P. Ferrero, Engineers
- L. Cpl. J. L. Forman, Inf.
- Sgt. H. H. Frohbos, Inf.
- L. Cpl. J. A. Gaston, Inf.
- Pte. F. Goldsworthy, Inf.
- Pte. A. Gray, Inf.
- Pte. P. R. Greenhough, Inf.
- Pte. H. L. Hare, Inf.
- Pte. W. S. Harris, Inf.
- Sgt. W. C. Hawke, Inf.
- Pte. M. A. Holliday, Inf.
- Pte. R. J. Holmes, Inf.
- Pte. W. B. Huntley, Inf.
- Sgt. W. N. James, Inf.
- Pte. P. D. Jones, Inf.
- Pte. W. G. Langlands, Inf.
- Cpl. A. Lavarack, Inf.
- Pte. R. J. Lawrence, Inf.
- L. Cpl. J. J. Loubser, Inf.
- Pte. W. Mackay, Inf.
- Pte. A. G. McL. Mackintosh, Inf.
- L. Cpl. D. McGregor, Inf.
- Pte. S. G. Mills, Inf.
- Sgt. T. H. Nichols, Inf.
- L. Cpl. J. E. T. Noble, Inf.
- Sgt. W. A. Norvall, Inf.
- Pte. J. G. Parkinson, Inf.
- L. Cpl. H. F. Pentz, Inf.
- Pte. A. Rennie, Inf.
- Cpl. A. Ryder, Inf.
- Pte. R. C. Scott, Inf.
- L. Cpl. F. R. Shapcott, Inf.
- Sgt. J. Shearer, Inf.
- Pte. G. S. Shephard, Inf.
- Cpl. J. N. Simpson, Inf.
- Pte. A. W. C. Smith, Inf.
- L. Cpl. R. G. Stephen, Inf.
- L. Cpl. M. W. Surmon, Inf.
- Pte. L. H. Suttie, Inf.
- Sgt. J. Symonds, Inf.
- Cpl. W. Willcocks, Inf.
- Pte. C. H. Wright, Inf.
- Pte. W. N. Sobey, Inf.

East African Force

- Cpl. F. A. Schroeder, Cape Corps
- Sgt. G. H. Waldeck, Inf.

African Native Troops

- Sgt. Abdulla bin Hassan, King's African Rifles
- Pte. Alukuri, Nigeria Reg.
- Pte. Girwa bin Kamisi, King's African Rifles
- Sgt. Mafindi Shewa, Nigeria Reg.
- Pte. Mallam Duchi, Nigeria Reg.
- Pte. Moma Sokoto, Nigeria Reg.
- Pte. Tanko I., Nigeria Reg.

=== Awarded a Bar to the Military Medal (MM*) ===
- Spr. W. Paddock, Royal Engineers (Manchester)
- Cpl. E. Hallatt, Royal Engineers (Liverpool)
- Cpl. T. Baker, Royal Field Arty. (Abingdon)
- Sgt. J. Malia, RAMC (Newcastle upon Tyne)
- Sgt. E. Fuller, Australian Army Service Corps
- Sgt. S. Davies, Cheshire Reg. (Birkenhead)
- L. Cpl. H. T. Jones, London Reg. (Clapham)
- Spr. H. C. Rycroft, Royal Engineers (Colne)
- 2nd Cpl. R. R. White, Royal Engineers (Leamington-on-Tyne)
- Sgt. E. Aldridge, Royal West Surrey Reg. (Pimlico)
- Cpl. C. C. Bradly, Canadian Machine Gun Corps
- Pnr. J. W, Barrass, Royal Engineers (Felling)
- Sgt. T. W. Barkes, Nottinghamshire and Derbyshire Reg. (Heanor)
- Sgt. J. H. Tucker, Devonshire Reg. (Dartmouth)
- Sgt. A. J. McKinnon, Australian Inf.
- Sgt. J. B. Smith, Manchester Reg. (Pendleton)
- Cpl. C. Speller, RAMC (Nutana, Canada)
- Pte. J. Tipping, RAMC (Belfast)
- Gnr. W. J. Austin, Royal Field Arty. (Norwich)
- L. Cpl. W. G. Cawte, Devonshire Reg. (Heywood)
- Pte. A. S. Bruce, Royal Engineers (Sunderland)
- Cpl. A. W. Willingham, Australian Inf.
- Cpl. E. Bell, Royal Field Arty. (Brockley)
- Sgt. R. H. B. Malcolm, Australian Army Medical Corps
- Sgt. R. Brown, Northumberland Fusiliers (Seaton)
- Cpl. W. Buchanan, Cameron Highlanders (Glasgow)
- Sgt. G. Carter, Royal Field Arty. (Liverpool)
- Sgt. J. Cutts, York & Lancaster Reg. (Yorkshire)
- Cpl. G. Staples, RAMC (Tulse Hill)
- Sgt. J. R. Forrest, Australian Division, Trench Mortar Battery
- Sgt. R. L. Edwards, Canadian Machine Gun Corps
- Sgt. R. H. MacKenzie, Canadian Machine Gun Corps
- Cpl. R. Baird, Royal Field Arty. (Fauldhouse)
- Cpl. P. Docherty, Royal Field Arty. (Sunderland)
- Sgt. S. H. Martin, Royal Fusiliers (Silverdale)
- Sgt. O. Oakes, Manchester Reg. (Moulton)
- Sgt. W. G. Smith, Canadian Field Arty.
- Pte. C. B. Pearson, Australian Inf.
- Pte. F. Buckley, Australian Pioneer Battalion
- Cpl. W. J. Cooper, Australian Inf.
- Sgt. F. J. McEwan, Australian Inf.
- Sgt. H. V. Mayt, London Reg. (Fulham)
- Sgt. E. Sales, South Staffordshire Reg. (Mansfield)
- Air Mechanic, 1st Class, S. R. Deane, Royal Flying Corps (London)
- Sgt. J. Collyer, Royal Garrison Arty. (Staten Island, N.Y.)
- Petty Ofc. G. Young, Royal Naval Volunteer Reserve (Forfar)
- L. Cpl. P. Pratt, Australian Army Medical Corps
- Sgt. J. McIntyre, East Yorkshire Reg. (Choppington)
- Gnr. W. F. Parkes, Royal Garrison Arty. (E. Stockton)
- Act. Cpl. A. Pirie, Labour Corps (Aberdeen)
- Sgt. A. V. English, Gloucestershire Reg. (Fakenham)
- L. Sgt. A. A. Goulding, Nottinghamshire and Derbyshire Reg. (Nottingham)
- Bombr. J. Jackson, Royal Field Arty. (Chelsea)
- Cpl. H. J. Samuels, Royal Field Arty. (Liverpool)
- Petty Ofc. E. C. Davies, Royal Naval Volunteer Reserve (South Elmsall)
- Sgt. H. Buckle, Royal Garrison Arty. (Yorkshire)
- Cpl. E. Partridge, South Staffordshire Reg. (Walsall)
- Pte. H. Reddaway, Machine Gun Corps (Coppleston)
- Pte. G. H. Beadle, Australian Inf.
- L. Sgt. R. Giessler, Australian Inf.
- Pte. E. Wilkinson, Australian Inf.
- Pte. W. Atkinson, Northumberland Fusiliers (Scarborough)
- L. Cpl. E. J. Foreman, Lancashire Fusiliers (Stockton-on-Tees)
- Pte. J. Low, Gordon Highlanders (Glasgow)
- Pte. J. McLeod, Gordon Highlanders (Glasgow)
- Pte. F. J. Shirley, Royal Warwickshire Reg. (Handsworth)
- Sgt. R. Tippen, Gordon Highlanders (Newmilns)
- Dvr. E. M. Lucas, Australian Field Arty.
- Pte. H. C. McAlpine, Australian Inf.
- Pte. T. Porter, Australian Inf.
- Sgt. H. J. Smith, Australian Inf.
- L. Cpl. D. Fenner, Australian Army Medical Corps
- Pte. C. F. Ellingsen, Australian Army Medical Corps
- L. Cpl. T. J. Price, Australian Army Medical Corps
- Sgt. F. Barnes, Machine Gun Corps (Oldham)
- Pte. T. Hailstones, Royal Highlanders (Hamilton)
- Sgt. R. E. Russell, Royal Engineers (Bristol)
- Pte. W. Sanders, Oxfordshire & Buckinghamshire Light Inf. (Wolverton)
- L. Cpl. T. H. Rose, Royal Lancaster Reg. (Middleton Junction)
- C.Q.M.S. A. E. Toner, Liverpool Reg. (Liverpool)
- Pte. E. G. Ludlow, Royal Berkshire Reg. (E. Reading)
- Pte. A. Hoatson, South African Inf.
- Sgt. P. Blent, Rifle Brigade (Moorlands)
- Sgt. H. Cox, Machine Gun Corps (Ropsley)
- Pnr. A. R. Dennis, Royal Engineers (Thornton Heath)
- Cpl. J. T. Anthony, Royal Welsh Fusiliers (Barry Dock)
- Pte. G. H. P. Lyons, Royal Warwickshire Reg. (Warboys)
- Sgt. W. H. Young, Royal Field Arty. (Westcombe Park, London)
- Gnr. H. Blount, Royal Garrison Arty. (Croydon)
- L. Cpl. J. Quinn, York & Lancaster Reg. (Glasgow)
- Pte. G. L. Hampton, Australian Inf.
- Spr. R. T. Whitehorn, Royal Engineers (Eyremount)
- L. Cpl. J. Birch, Royal Engineers (Baschurch)
- Pte. A. H. Renshaw, King's Royal Rifle Corps (Stoke)
- Cpl. W. Wilcock, Northumberland Fusiliers (Sheffield)
- Pte. A. Robinson, Australian Inf.
- L. Cpl. C. W. Wignell, Australian Inf.
- Pte. J. Tomlinson, Machine Gun Corps (Castleton)
- Sgt. B. R. Walker, East Yorkshire Reg. (Hull)
- Sgt. W. F. Bartlett, Machine Gun Corps (Bradford)
- Sgt. J. W. Lambourn, Royal Berkshire Reg. (Reading)
- Cpl. F. Greenway, Australian Light Trench Mortar Battery
- Pte. W. Cairns, Argyll and Sutherland Highlanders (Glasgow)
- L. Sgt. R. Clark, Lincolnshire Reg. (Retford)
- Gnr. G. Cobban, Royal Field Arty. (Leith Pettercairn)
- Cpl. G. Stirling, Scots Guards (Edinburgh)
- Cpl. L. Mellor, Royal Field Arty. (Dewsbury)
- Sgt. F. Sherwin, Royal Field Arty. (Birshall)
- Spr. E. Taylor, Royal Engineers (Harlington)
- L. Cpl. T. G. Williams, Royal Engineers (Norbury)
- Pte. A. Bennett, Royal Highlanders (Dundee)
- Pte. P. Gethins, Royal Highlanders (Kingham)
- Act. Sgt. E. J. Lloyd, Durham Light Inf. (Dudley)
- Sgt. P. C. Walker, Machine Gun Corps (Hampstead)
- Pte. G. W. Pratt, Australian Inf.
- Pte. H. E. Fielder, Hampshire Reg. (Southampton)
- Cpl. W. Lewis, Machine Gun Corps (Haggliscote)
- Pte. J. McNeil, East Yorkshire Reg. (Wishaw)
- Cpl. J. Cummings, Royal Field Arty. (Greenock)
- Pte. J. Gardiner, Royal Scots (Wamphrey)
- Pte. G. Gilhespy, Royal West Surrey Reg. (Fence Houses)
- Spr. J. A. Guy, Australian Engineers
- L. Cpl. F. G. Hamilton, Australian Army Medical Corps
- Sgt. B. Jones, RAMC (Wrexham)
- Sgt. W. Neale, Worcestershire Reg. (Wolverton)
- Sgt. W. Waldron, Machine Gun Corps (Wolstanton)
- 2nd Cpl. W. H. Long, Australian Engineers
- Pte. C. T. Wilton, Australian Inf.
- Pte. J. Crilley, Scottish Rifles (Rutherglen)
- Pte. J. Hill, Royal Scots (Cleland)
- Sgt. S. J. Kay, RAMC (Liverpool)
- Cpl. A. Kerr, Royal Scots (Douglas Water, by Lanark)
- Pte. V. A. Mess, Royal Fusiliers (Dover)
- Pte. E. A. Corey, Australian Inf.
- Sgt. A. V. Fergusson, Australian Inf.
- Sgt. A. Stephenson, RAMC (Wigan)
- Cpl. F. Reay, Worcestershire Reg. (Walsall)
- Pte. A. Binks, North Lancashire Reg. (Bolton)
- Cpl. T. Morrisey, Royal Dublin Fusiliers (Liverpool)
- Pte. J. Pownall, South Lancashire Reg. (Bickerstaffe)
- Cpl. R. Aspinwall, Liverpool Reg. (Southport)
- Sgt. F. W. Ball, Royal Lancaster Reg. (Tring)
- Pte. A. Davies, Liverpool Reg. (Bootle)
- Cpl. J. Farrington, Liverpool Reg. (Southport)
- Sgt. A. W. Harrington, Essex Reg. (Dagenham)
- Cpl. H. MacNicoll, Liverpool Reg. (Liverpool)
- Pte. J. Territt, Royal Dublin Fusiliers (Rathstewart)
- Pte. T. J. Meaney, Newfoundland Reg.
- L. Cpl. W. Buckley, Depot, Cheshire Reg. (Chester)
- Sgt. G. B. Cruickshank, Royal Highlanders (Dundee)
- L. Cpl. F. Doncaster, King's Royal Rifle Corps (Clerkenwell)
- L. Cpl. G. H. Elson, Nottinghamshire and Derbyshire Reg. (Askern, Yorkshire)
- Sgt. C. H. Flood, Cambridgeshire Reg. (Wisbech)
- L. Cpl. G. J. Graham, Royal Fusiliers (Ilford)
- Pte. P. Harrison, RAMC (St. Helens)
- Pte. A. Hawbrook, Nottinghamshire and Derbyshire Reg. (Hetheringham, Lincolnshire)
- Sgt. W. J. Litchfield, Hertfordshire Reg. (Stevenage)
- L. Cpl. H. Livermore, Rifle Brigade (Hartford End, Essex)
- Pte. L. Bell, York & Lancaster Reg. (Barnsley)
- Pte. G. R. Milthorpe, Australian Inf.
- Gnr. T. Ward, Royal Field Arty. (Fulham)

=== Awarded a Second Bar to the Military Medal (MM**) ===
- Cpl. L. P. Smardon, Canadian Reg.
- L. Cpl. A. Breeze, Worcestershire Reg. (Dudley)
- Cpl. K. Goodwin, Gordon Highlanders (Stirling)
- Sgt. S. Forbes, Depot, York & Lancaster Reg. (E. Aberdeen)

== See also ==
- 1918 New Year Honours - Full list of awards.
